= Anne of Green Gables: The Animated Series =

Television series

- DVD cover
- Genre: Comedy drama; Historical; Fantasy
- Directed by: Lilliane Andre; Richard Allen
- Voices of: Bryn McAuley; Wayne Robson; Patricia Gage; Emily Hampshire; Ali Mukaddam; Dalene Irvine; Kyle Fairlie; Linda Sorenson
- Opening theme: "Theme Song" performed by Bryn McAuley
- Ending theme: "Instrumental Theme" (reprise)
- Composer: Peter Breiner
- Country of origin: Canada
- Original language: English
- No. of seasons: 1
- No. of episodes: 26

Production
- Executive producers: Kevin Sullivan; Trudy Grant
- Producer: Marilyn McAuley
- Running time: 22 minutes
- Production companies: Sullivan Animation; Annemation Productions Inc.

Original release
- Network: TVOKids (Canada); PBS member stations (U.S.)
- Release: September 2, 2001 – February 24, 2002

Anne of Green Gables: The Animated Series is a Canadian animated children's television series produced by Sullivan Entertainment and developed by writer/director/producer Kevin Sullivan, based on the 1908 novel Anne of Green Gables by L. M. Montgomery. Many supporting characters are sourced from Sullivan's television series Road to Avonlea, which is based on Montgomery's books The Story Girl and The Golden Road. One season of the series was produced, with 26 episodes, originally airing from 2001 to 2002. The series was developed for PBS member stations and was originally distributed by PBS from 2001 to 2005, then later by American Public Television from 2010 to 2015. It is the second animated series based on the Anne of Green Gables story. The first one is of the same name, produced by Nippon Animation in 1979.

Each episode contained an educational aspect, with a problem for one or more of the show's characters to face and solve. In conjunction with these problems, PBS "Ready to Learn" guides were created for teachers in America to use in classrooms.

== Characters ==
=== Main ===
- Anne Shirley (voiced by Bryn McAuley) is a smart and imaginative redheaded freckle-faced orphan girl who is adopted by the aging Cuthbert siblings. She is the main character of the series and appears in every episode of the show.
- Matthew Cuthbert (voiced by Wayne Robson) is a quiet and kind bachelor farmer who is Marilla's older brother and Anne's adoptive father.
- Marilla Cuthbert (voiced by Patricia Gage) is Matthew's younger sister and Anne's adoptive aunt. She has a very strict, no-nonsense attitude but loves Anne very much. She is the second most predominant character in the series, after Anne.
- Diana Barry (voiced by Emily Hampshire) is Anne's best friend, known for her jet-black hair and sunny disposition.
- Gilbert Blythe (voiced by Ali Mukaddam) is Anne's friend who often competes with her academically.
- Felicity King (voiced by Dalene Irvine) is a classmate of Anne and company who is very jealous of her and often seeks to embarrass her. However, despite this, she and Anne are still occasionally friends. She is based on the character of the same name from Road to Avonlea.
- Felix King (voiced by Kyle Fairlie) is Felicity's younger brother and one of Anne's best friends. He is a kind, sturdy, and inventive boy. He owns a rowdy Fox Terrier called Caesar. He is based on the character of the same name from Road to Avonlea.
- Hetty King (voiced by Linda Sorenson) is the Avonlea schoolteacher. Like Marilla, she has a very strict, no-nonsense attitude but has faith in her students. She is based on the character of the same name from Road to Avonlea.

=== Supporting ===
- Peg Bowen (voiced by Anne Anglin) is an eccentric woman of whom the kids are afraid until they learn she holds the answers to many of their problems. She appears in "The Stray", "Taffy", "One True Friend", "Lost and Found", "The Ice Cream Promise", "The Witch of Avonlea", "A Square Peg", and "A Condition of Superstition". She is based on the character of the same name from Road to Avonlea.
- Dryad (voiced by Tracey Moore) is a wood nymph of Anne's imagination who occasionally helps Anne in solving problems.
- Rachel Lynde (voiced by Patricia Hamilton) is Marilla's friend and the most gossipy woman in Avonlea. She appears in "Babysitter Blues", "Idle Chatter", "The Ice Cream Promise", "The Avonlea Herald", "A Condition of Superstition", and "A Better Mousetrap". Hamilton also portrayed Rachel in the four live-action Anne miniseries as well as Road to Avonlea.
- Caesar is Felix's dog, who is rowdy and out of control. He likes to escape by biting away the rope that ties him down. He only appears in two episodes, "A Condition of Superstition" and "No Anne is an Island". He is a Fox Terrier.
- The Willows (voiced by Keith Dinicol and Keith Knight) are two weeping willow trees that Anne talks to in her imagination. They seem to have different personalities; one is dramatic and stuffy, the other is grumpy and cynical. They appear in the episodes "The Stray", "Taffy", "One True Friend", "The Witch of Avonlea", and "A Condition of Superstition".
- Mr. Lawson (voiced by Richard Binsley)
- Mr. Arnold Gresham (voiced by Adrian Truss) is the mayor of Avonlea.
- Perry (voiced by Andrew Craig)
- The Swings are the local swing set. They have supernatural powers to see the future and tell where lost people are. They only appear in "A Condition of Superstition" because Anne and her friends asked so many questions that their powers seemed to wear off.

== Episodes ==
No.	Title	Lesson	Original release date
1	"The Witch of Avonlea"	High self-esteem	September 2, 2001
Anne attends a spelling bee, but loses her spelling ability after being supposedly cursed by Peg Bowen and fears losing after Ms. King stresses the importance of winning. She eventually learns the value of self-confidence and discovers curses are silly superstitions. Luckily, a toad (he’s not actually a toad) helps Anne and she manages to do better.
2	"Carrots"	Being proud of who you are	September 9, 2001
Anne is fed up with Gilbert calling her red hair "carrots" and decides to dye it. But it goes horribly wrong by dying her hair green! After talking to her imaginary friend Dryad about her situation, Anne realizes that her red hair is part of what makes her unique and she should be proud to show it off.
3	"The Stray"	Responsibility	September 16, 2001
On a rainy day, Anne finds a stray dog in the barn and calls him "Magic." The stray is reunited with his true owner when Peg Bowen shows Anne a poster of the dog.
4	"The Best Partner"	Acceptance	September 23, 2001
When Mr. Gresham's nephew, Ben, visits Avonlea, Anne and company are all excited because he will be in town for a sports event. But what else to do when Ben arrives in crutches, paralyzed from polio then accept him into the group? Eventually, Anne and Mr. Gresham come up with new events for the sports day that everyone can participate in.
5	"The Sleeves"	Individuality and trends	September 30, 2001
All of Avonlea is brimming with excitement as the world-famous Amelia Evans comes to town. She wears puffed sleeves, and everyone wants to dress like her. Anne becomes so preoccupied with appearances that she doesn't prepare for the talent show held in Amelia's honor. She goes off the fashion when she discovers that Amelia is a snob and resumes practice.
6	"Taffy"	Admittance of mistakes	October 7, 2001
The taffy contest at the corn fair in Avonlea is a fiasco, due to the "Sugar" and "Salt" cards being switched, and so, however, much sugar is supposed to be added to Anne's taffy, that much salt is added instead, and Anne is sure it is all Felicity's fault. It turns out that both are to blame because Anne accidentally switched the sugar and salt.
7	"One True Friend"	Friendship; loyalty	October 14, 2001
Anne defends Diana at school when she gets head lice and the other kids are disgusted. Soon Anne goes off to help the others decorate for Felicity's slumber party, causing Diana to feel betrayed and hurt since she was disinvited for having lice. Anne comes to the realization that if placed in the same situation, Diana would have remained loyal. Eventually, Anne and Diana become friends again.
8	"Lost and Found"	Preparedness	October 21, 2001
Anne and Diana venture into the woods in search of treasure but get lost. Then, they are able to find a way back by remembering the landmarks they passed along the way.
9	"Idle Chatter"	Being informed before making conclusions	October 28, 2001
Anne suspects Gilbert cheated on a test. His grades and reputation drop, and he struggles to prove Anne wrong. Then, Anne and Diana sneak into the school and discover Gilbert is innocent (what Anne assumed were "cheat sheets" were actually empty candy wrappers), but the whole class is too convinced Gilbert cheated.
10	"A Bully by the Horns"	Dealing with bullies; friendship	November 4, 2001
Felix is having problems with a bully who happens to be partners with him on a science project, and Anne helps him, Eventually, Felix becomes friends with the bully and they get a good science grade.
11	"The Ice Cream Promise"	Keeping promises; reliability	November 11, 2001
Anne promises to help Marilla make ice cream for the Avonlea book club meeting but ends up straying from her duties. In addition, Anne doesn't know what Shakespearean scene to play out for the meeting.
12	"A Question of Rules"	Rule-following	November 18, 2001
The Hunt for the Golden Crown, an Avonlea tradition, has Anne and her friends excited, until they learn that new and complex rules have been added, which leads them to ponder which rules should and should not be followed. Then, Anne leads a class of vegetables in her imagination and discovers that rules are more important than she thought.
13	"The Avonlea Herald"	Leadership	November 25, 2001
Rachel Lynde suggests the kids start a town newspaper, of which Anne is made editor. Soon the power goes to her head and she quarrels with Diana and her other friends involved in the project. Then, a bold rescue brings the kids together.
14	"Chores Eclipsed"	Importance of work	December 2, 2001
Anne prepares for a lunar eclipse party, but neglects her chores in the process, threatening to throw Green Gables into chaos.
15	"The Swim of Things"	Patience	December 9, 2001
Felix is a poor swimmer, and the other children grow impatient with him. His friendship with Anne is strengthened as they bond after the latter hurts her arm in a diving stunt and is banned from swimming for the rest of the day. Then, on the day of the swimming contest, Felicity drinks too many sodas and is unable to swim, giving Anne and Felix an opportunity to show their newfound skills they learned while practicing together.
16	"Butterflies"	Sportsmanship	December 16, 2001
Avonlea and the nearby town of Carmody are set to play a hockey game, and Gilbert is made the team captain. Everyone in town becomes obsessed with winning and forgets the value of good sportsmanship. Anne is more concerned with safety for the game, and so her classmates snub her. But when Felix hurts his leg, Anne's friends realize how important safety is.
17	"A Walk in His Shoes"	Respecting the opinions of others	December 23, 2001
Anne and Marilla argue over how their chores should be done, and Anne and Diana plan a surprise party for Gilbert but plan it around things they like (princes and princesses) instead of things he likes. Anne then has a dream sequence with Matthew's horse and discovers her mistake.
18	"Babysitter Blues"	Self-assurance	December 30, 2001
Gilbert thought babysitting Mrs. Lynde's nephew would be a breeze, but it doesn't go that way. Instead, the toddler causes mischief while Anne and Diana irresponsibly sneak off to Mrs. Van Hoyte's tea party.
19	"A Square Peg"	Respecting eccentricity	January 6, 2002
Peg Bowen, the town eccentric, comes to Avonlea for winter supplies, and after the kids spy on her, a snowstorm hits, and she saves Anne from its wrath. Anne and her friends then reconsider their opinions on Peg Bowen.
20	"Marbles"	Dealing with fads; sportsmanship	January 13, 2002
A marble craze hits Avonlea, and Anne accidentally loses a marble Matthew has owned since boyhood. She then convinces the gang to stop playing for keeps and to just play for fun.
21	"Oh, Brother!"	Getting along with siblings	January 20, 2002
Felicity and Felix's consistent fighting may spoil the upcoming King Family Reunion, and it's up to Anne to help them get along. In the end, Felix and Felicity learn to be better siblings.
22	"A Condition of Superstition"	Avoiding superstitions	January 27, 2002
Marilla works to persuade the town council to build a new library, but Anne and Diana's superstitious beliefs get in the way due to a pair of future-predicting swings foretelling Marilla would get struck by lightning before she succeeded in the library petition and also due to Felix's troublesome dog Caesar. Chastened, Anne realizes that superstitions are only there to stop people from solving problems themselves.
23	"A Welcome Hero"	Avoiding preconceived notions	February 3, 2002
When famed novelist E.J. Lark comes to town, Anne, who had assumed Lark to be a handsome man, learns not to judge a book by its cover when she finds that the author is really a bespectacled librarian-type woman.
24	"A Better Mousetrap"	Respecting others' ideas	February 10, 2002
When Avonlea is overrun by mice, the kids are assigned to build "the better mousetrap." Anne is paired with Diana for the task, but eventually, Felix is thrown in, which upsets the girls. The girls just ignore his ideas and focus on their own. When Felix discovers the ultimate solution to getting rid of the mice, Anne and Diana learn to include others' opinions and ideas and become friends with him again.
25	"No Anne Is an Island"	Including others	February 17, 2002
When Anne and Diana are snubbed by their peers, they form The Order of the Kindred Spirit, with only themselves as members. Soon Felicity turns the tables and starts her own club, Avonlea Castle, excluding only Anne and Diana. Anne and Diana then decide to join the other club, but their worthiness is proved when they save Felicity by sacrificing their clubhouse.
26	"Anne's Disappearing Allowance"	Money management	February 24, 2002
Matthew and Marilla decide to give Anne an allowance. To start, she receives five weeks' worth at once, and she spends it unwisely, and can no longer afford the very item she had been saving up for. Soon, Anne realizes that saving money is better than spending it all at once.

== Film adaptation ==
Anne: Journey to Green Gables DVD Cover

In 2005 (three years after the show ended), an animated "Anne of Green Gables" film was made, titled Anne: Journey to Green Gables. This 85-minute direct-to-video film was a prequel to both the live action and animated "Anne of Green Gables" series. The voice cast included Lally Cadeau, Cedric Smith, Kathryn Greenwood, and Patricia Hamilton, all of whom had appeared in past Sullivan Entertainment productions.

In Journey to Green Gables, Anne Shirley is a clumsy yet imaginative orphan girl whose biological parents (Walter and Bertha Shirley) died when she was just a baby and since then has been living in and out of orphanages and foster homes. She currently lives in Nova Scotia and works under the abusive servitude of the Hammond family, who have eight children including three sets of twins: all of whom she is forced to take care of, such as giving baths, changing dirty diapers, etc. While living with the Hammonds, Anne is bullied by her foster siblings and is constantly mistreated and degraded by her foster parents on a day to day basis, with her treasured story books being the only comfort in life until one day the Hammonds have Anne sent away against her wishes to the dreary Grout Orphanage, operated by the aristocratic and magisterial director Madame Poubelle. During her time at the orphanage, Anne along with the other children are subjected into slavery and deprived of having toys, nice clothes, and full course meals; she later has most of her books confiscated by Poubelle who throws them in the fireplace to be burned, except for her favourite book-(entitled "The Rich & Famous Lives of French Nobility") that was saved by Mavis, an orphanage assistant who shows sympathy and compassion towards Anne and the children while she works and suffers under Poubelle's cruel authority.

A while later, Anne arrives in the fictional town of Avonlea in Prince Edward Island and is mistakably taken to live on the pastoral home of the aging Marilla Cuthbert and her older brother Matthew, who were expecting a little boy named Charlie-(who also lived in the Grout Orphanage, but was instead sent to the Hammond family as Anne's replacement). Despite the mix-up, Marilla-(who originally planned on sending Anne back to the orphanage) reluctantly takes in Anne into her care, but as Anne becomes a big help with the house and the farm, Marilla's outlook on Anne begins to change on a positive note and becomes more of a mother figure to her. Meanwhile, when Madame Poubelle recalls Anne's supposed claims of being the sole heir of the LaRoue family inheritance and their heirloom, she becomes determined to get Anne back into the orphanage, with help from her two bumbling henchmen Wilfred and Tupper in order to reclaim her own lost inheritance that was gambled away.
