= Lantern Hill (film) =

- DVD cover
- Based on: Jane of Lantern Hill by Lucy Maud Montgomery
- Screenplay by: Kevin Sullivan; Fiona McHugh
- Directed by: Kevin Sullivan
- Starring: Mairon Bennett; Sam Waterston; Patricia Phillips; Zoe Caldwell; Sarah Polley; Colleen Dewhurst
- Theme music composer: John Welsman
- Country of origin: Canada
- Original language: English

Production
- Producers: Jim Burt; Trudy Grant; Cathy Johnson; Jay Rayvid; David Shepherd; Kevin Sullivan
- Running time: 111 minutes (approx.)
- Production company: Sullivan Entertainment

Original release
- Network: Disney Channel; CBC Television
- Release: August 29, 1989

Lantern Hill is a 1989 Canadian drama television film written and directed by filmmaker Kevin Sullivan and based L.M. Montgomery's novel Jane of Lantern Hill. The film was co-produced by Sullivan Entertainment, the Disney Channel and CBC Television.

For the production of the film, Lantern Hill was filmed using the same house used for Sullivan's earlier production, Anne of Green Gables, though painted orange. Many of the actors and actresses from Anne of Green Gables, Anne of Green Gables: The Sequel, and Road to Avonlea made appearances in this film. At least one DVD release (illustrated at right) appended Anne of Green Gables to the title of the film; however, other than being also based upon a Lucy Maud Montgomery novel and sharing some cast members from Sullivan's earlier production, plus also being set on Prince Edward Island, Lantern Hill has no connection to Anne of Green Gables.

== Story ==
12 year old Jane Stuart (Mairon Bennett) has long been told by her Grandmother Kennedy (Zoe Caldwell) that her father is dead. When her mother, Robin Stuart (Patricia Phillips) returns home after recovering from a long illness, Jane learns that her mysterious father, Andrew Stuart (Sam Waterston) is still alive. When Jane finally meets her father and travels with him to Prince Edward Island to stay at Lantern Hill, their family home, she discovers that he is a kind man that cares deeply for both her and her mother. Determined to reunite her parents, Jane enlists the aid of Hepzibah (Colleen Dewhurst), a powerful mystic, to help her solve an old mystery that has torn apart her family. In a subplot, Jody Turner (Sarah Polley) is an abused servant girl who lives next door to Jane. They become best friends. Jody follows Jane on her journey and winds up working hard labor for several different people. Jane and Hepzibah convince Hepzibah's sisters to adopt Jody, which they oppose to at first because they want a boy. Later on they agree to adopt Jody {It's inferred that Hepzibah somehow made them change their minds.} Later on, Hepzibah dies with Jane and Jody by her side.

== Cast ==
- Jane Stuart – Mairon Bennett
- Andrew Stuart – Sam Waterston
- Robin Stuart – Patricia Phillips
- Mrs. Kennedy – Zoe Caldwell
- Jody – Sarah Polley
- Hepzibah – Colleen Dewhurst
- Aunt Irene – Vivian Reis
- Violet Titus – Joyce Campion
- Justina Titus – Florence Paterson
- Lillian Morrow – Sharry Flett
- Evelyn Morror – Glori Gage
- Aggie – Dora Dainton
- William Kennedy – Robert Benson
- Phyllis Kennedy – Juno Mills Cockell
- Gertrude Kennedy – Jillian Cook
- Frank Price – James Mainprize
- Mary Price – Judy Sinclair
- Cook - Valerie Boyle
- Superintendent - Durward Allen
- Mrs. Stanley - Esther Hockin
- Anne Farquhar - Cecily Stanley
- Agnes Ripley - Alyson Court
- Schoolgirl - Dorion Davis
- Mrs. Simpson - Denise Fergusson
- Charlotte Simpson - Ellen Dubin
- Little Schoolgirl - Gillian Steeve
- Poultry Boy - Noam Zylberman
- Owen Meade - Gareth Bennett
- Jimmy-John Meade - Zachary Bennett
- Dr. Arnett - Dan MacDonald
- Milkman - Paul Coeur
- Train Conductor - Jack Mather
- Train Cook - Jason St. Amour

== List of Awards ==
- Heartland Film Festival – Crystal Heart Award, 1992
- 2 Gemini Awards:
  - Best Supporting Actress (Sarah Polley), 1991
  - Best Costume Design (Martha Mann), 1991
- ACE Award – Best Supporting Actress (Colleen Dewhurst), 1990
- Emmy Nomination – Best Supporting Actress (Colleen Dewhurst), 1990
- Frankfurt Film Festival – Nominated, 1990
- 38th Annual Columbus Film Festival – Honourable Mention – Art & Culture Category, 1990
- International Film & Television Festival of New York – Family Special – Finalist Certificate, 1990
