= Trudy Grant =

Canadian film and television producer

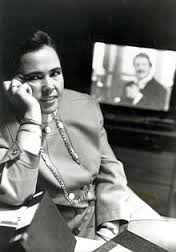
- Education: University of Western Ontario (B.A. and Bachelor of Education)
- Occupations: Executive Producer and President of Sullivan Entertainment International Inc
- Years active: 1981–present
- Spouse: Kevin Sullivan

Trudy Grant, President of Sullivan Entertainment International and COO of the Sullivan Entertainment Group, has been part of the establishment of the Canadian entertainment industry for nearly thirty years. Grant, who is married to Kevin Sullivan, has won numerous awards for her work in television and film.

Grant has been instrumental in making Sullivan Entertainment International a major exporter of Canadian and international media content around the world, with an inventory of movies and programming from all genres, including miniseries, feature films, family and children's drama, and documentaries.

== Filmography ==
Executive Producer

- Anne of Green Gables: A New Beginning (2008)
- Magic Flute Diaries (2008)
- Anne: Journey to Green Gables (animated film, 2005)
- The Piano Man’s Daughter (film, 2003)
- A Wind at My Back Christmas (film, 2001)
- P.R. Operation Overload (film, 2001)
- P.R. (television series, 2001)
- Anne of Green Gables: The Animated Series (television series, 2001)
- Wind at My Back (1996–2001)
- Anne of Green Gables: The Continuing Story (2000)
- Seasons of Love (film, 1999)
- An Avonlea Christmas (aka. Happy Christmas Miss King) (film, 1998)
- Promise the Moon (film, 1997)
- Sleeping Dogs Lie (film, 1998)
- Road to Avonlea (1989–1996)
- Butterbox Babies (film, 1995)
- Under the Piano (film, 1995)
- By Way of the Stars (film, 1992)
- Lantern Hill (film, 1990)
- Looking for Miracles (film, 1989)
- Anne of Green Gables: The Sequel (1987)
- Anne of Green Gables (1985)

== List of Awards ==
- George Foster Peabody Award
- 3 Emmy Awards
- 6 Emmy Award Nominations
- 5 Gemini Awards
- 8 Gemini Award Nominations
- 3 CableACE Awards
- 2 CableAce Nominations
- Prix Jeunesse
- TV Guide Parent's Choice Award
- American TV Critics Award
- 3 Golden Apple Awards from the National Educational Media Competition
- 1 Ollie Award
- European Jury Prize at the Umbriafiction TV Festival
- Gold World Medal – New York Film Festival
- Golden Gate Award
- Gold Medal – New York International Film and Television Festival
- ACT Award
- Best Children's Production – Television Movie Awards
