= The Piano Man's Daughter =

1995 novel by Timothy Findley

- First edition
- Author: Timothy Findley
- Language: English
- Publication date: 1995

The Piano Man's Daughter is a novel by Timothy Findley, first published in 1995 by HarperCollins Canada. It was a nominee for the 1995 Giller Prize.

== Summary ==
In the novel, narrator Charlie Kilworth recounts the history of his family, concentrating on his mother Lily and his grandmother Ede to find out who is his real father.

== Adaptation ==
The novel was adapted into a television film in 2003 by Sullivan Entertainment.
