= CBC Family Hour =

Canadian TV anthology series

CBC Family Hour is an anthology series of Canadian programming intended for family viewing, which aired on CBC Television with a regular weekly timeslot of Sundays at 7:00 p.m. (7:30 p.m. Newfoundland Time). The title was in use from fall 1989 until no later than 2001, though CBC resumed airing family dramas in the same timeslot in 2007, and continues to do so as of 2022.

Early promotion for the series suggested a variety of programs would air in the hour, including figure skating exhibitions and a Raffi concert film. However, from January 7, 1990, to March 31, 1996, the hour's primary, if not sole, occupant was Road to Avonlea, a period drama series produced by Sullivan Entertainment based on the works of Lucy Maud Montgomery. Shortly after that series concluded in 1996, it was succeeded by a different Sullivan Entertainment series, Wind at My Back, later sharing the timeslot seasonally with Emily of New Moon, based on another book series by Montgomery.

The Family Hour branding was dropped by the time Wind at My Back concluded in 2001, though possibly well before. In any event, following its initial season, the Family Hour title was rarely promoted outside of brief announcements at the beginning and end of the hour.

Other programming, including The Wonderful World of Disney, aired in the timeslot from fall 2001 through the end of the 2006–07 season. In fall 2007, CBC premiered a new Canadian family drama titled Heartland, which has been the main occupant of the timeslot ever since, with second-run episodes of When Calls the Heart airing as summer replacement programming for several years beginning in 2015.
