= Raymond Storey =

Canadian playwright and television writer

- Born: 1956 (age 69–70); Brampton, Ontario, Canada
- Occupations: playwright, television writer
- Years active: 1980s-present
- Notable work: The Saints and Apostles, The Glorious 12th, Iron Road

Raymond Storey (born 1956 in Brampton, Ontario) is a Canadian playwright and television writer. He is best known for his plays The Saints and Apostles, which was a shortlisted finalist for the Governor General's Award for English-language drama at the 1993 Governor General's Awards, and The Glorious 12th, which won the Dora Mavor Moore Award for Outstanding New Play in 1996.

His other plays have included South of China, Adventures in Turning Forty, The Last Bus, Angel of Death, Country Chorale, The Dreamland, Girls in the Gang and Cheek to Cheek. Country Chorale, Girls in the Gang and The Dreamland were cowritten with composer John Roby.

For television, his credits have included episodes of Road to Avonlea, Traders, Made in Canada, Wind at My Back, The Guard, King, Bomb Girls and Guidestones, and the television films Bach's Fight for Freedom, Butterbox Babies, Happy Christmas, Miss King, Open Heart, and Iron Road.

He was nominated for Best Writing in a Dramatic Program or Mini-Series in 1996 for Butterbox Babies, and in 2004 for Open Heart. He won Best Writing in a Children's or Youth Program in 1998 for The Inventors’ Specials - Leonardo: A Dream of Flight. He was a writer and producer on Searching for Vimy's Lost Soldiers, which was nominated for a Canadian Screen Award as Outstanding History Documentary Program or Series in 2018.
