= Anne of Green Gables: A New Beginning =

2008 film directed by Kevin Sullivan

- a poster for this film
- Based on: Characters from Anne of Green Gables by Lucy Maud Montgomery
- Written by: Kevin Sullivan
- Directed by: Kevin Sullivan
- Starring: Hannah Endicott-Douglas; Barbara Hershey; Shirley MacLaine; Rachel Blanchard
- Music by: Peter Breiner
- Country of origin: Canada
- Original language: English

Production
- Producers: Kevin Sullivan; Trudy Grant
- Cinematography: Yuri Yakubiw
- Editor: Gordon McClellan
- Running time: 144 minutes (approx.)
- Production company: Sullivan Entertainment

Original release
- Network: CTV
- Release: December 14, 2008

Related
- Anne of Green Gables: The Continuing Story (2000)

Anne of Green Gables: A New Beginning is a 2008 Canadian made-for-television drama film and the fourth and final film in Sullivan Entertainment's Anne of Green Gables series. It was released in 2008 on CTV. Shortly before the broadcast, CTV had acquired the rights to the entire Anne catalogue, including the 1985 miniseries.

Created to celebrate the 100th anniversary of Lucy Maud Montgomery's Anne of Green Gables novel, the film stars Barbara Hershey as the middle-aged Anne Shirley and 14-year-old Hannah Endicott-Douglas as a young Anne, with Shirley MacLaine playing matriarch Amelia Thomas. Kevin Sullivan wrote a completely new screenplay for the nearly two and a half hour movie based on Montgomery's characters. The events that take place before Anne arrives in Green Gables are framed around the older Anne remembering her past. Thus the film serves as both a prequel and sequel to Sullivan's three previous miniseries broadcast originally on CBC and not directly from her books.

== Plot ==
Anne Shirley, now a middle-aged woman in 1946, is troubled by recent events in her life. Her husband, Gilbert, has been killed overseas while serving as a medical doctor during World War II. Her two daughters are preoccupied with their own families, and her adopted son Dominic has yet to return from the war. When a long-hidden secret is discovered under the floorboards at Green Gables, Anne retreats into her memories to relive her troubled early years prior to arriving as an orphan at Green Gables, and being adopted by the Cuthberts.

After discovering the truth about her biological parents, Anne begins the search for her birth father.

== Release ==
The telefilm premiered on Sunday December 14, 2008 on CTV; it was broadcast in high definition. In the United States, it has aired on PBS member stations since November 2010. It was released on DVD on May 5, 2009, by Sullivan Entertainment. The company also published a soundtrack, first available for download on January 8, 2009, and then on CD on June 16, 2009.

Prior to the film's debut, Key Porter Books published a novelization of the film by Kevin Sullivan in October 2008.

== Cast ==
- Barbara Hershey as Anne Shirley
- Hannah Endicott-Douglas as Young Anne
- Shirley MacLaine as Amelia Thomas
- Rachel Blanchard as Louisa Thomas
- Ben Carlson as Walter Shirley
- Natalie Radford as Bertha Shirley
- Ron Lea as Gene Armstrong
- Kyra Harper as Nellie Parkhurst
- Joan Gregson as Hepzibah
- Vivien Endicott-Douglas as Violetta Thomas
- Patricia Hamilton as Rachel Lynde
- James Carroll as Jeremiah Land
- Colleen Dewhurst as Marilla Cuthbert (archive footage)
- Megan Follows as Anne Shirley (archive footage)

== Production notes ==
All of the movie's actual location photography was shot in various places around the Ontario area, using existing houses, streetscapes and natural environments. Period mansions were used as the backdrop for the Thomas residences, and an historic Quaker Boys School converted into the Bolingbroke Poorhouse for the film.

When they could not film on location, the production crew and special effects team employed the technology of the green screen and fully computerized to digitally create the background, or specific details that location filming could not produce.

Of the major cast members from the original trilogy of films, only Patricia Hamilton (Rachel Lynde) reprised her original character. Barbara Hershey replaced Megan Follows as Anne, although Follows briefly appears in archive footage when Anne is reminiscing. Colleen Dewhurst, who had played Marilla Cuthbert in the first two miniseries and the spin-off series Road to Avonlea before her death in 1991, and Jonathan Crombie, who previously portrayed Gilbert Blythe, are also featured in archive footage presented as flashbacks. For the role of young Anne, Sullivan held a cross-Canada open casting call in July 2007, including submissions from YouTube, before Hannah Endicott-Douglas auditioned the part.

== Reception ==
In its debut on CTV, the film was watched by 1,042,000 viewers, a number that was seen as low compared to Sullivan's earlier Anne productions.

The film was not well received by critics or fans. The Globe and Mail's Kate Taylor said the film, "never justifies its presumption in inventing a new creation story for a Canadian literary icon." Bill Brioux felt that "maybe Anne just doesn't age all that well. Maybe she is supposed to stay in freckles and pigtails, locked in that perfect P.E.I. prism Montgomery authored and Sullivan so artfully adapted when they both were in their 20s."

== See also ==
- Before Green Gables, a prequel novel published in 2008.
