= The Wild Pony =

- DVD Cover
- Based on: The Year of the Black Pony by Walt Morey
- Written by: Kevin Sullivan; Eda Lishman
- Directed by: Kevin Sullivan
- Starring: Marilyn Lightstone; Art Hindle; Losh Byrne; Kelsey McLeod
- Theme music composer: Hagood Hardy
- Country of origin: Canada
- Original language: English

Production
- Producers: Kevin Sullivan; Eda Lishman
- Running time: 90 minutes (approx.)

Original release
- Release: 1983

The Wild Pony is a made for pay-TV movie produced in 1983 by Kevin Sullivan (Anne of Green Gables) and Eda Lishman. Sullivan and Lishman also co-wrote the screenplay based on the book "The Year of the Black Pony" by American author Walt Morey. "The Wild Pony" has the distinction of being the first example of a Canadian film produced specifically for pay-TV. The film, directed by Kevin Sullivan and starring Canadian Actors Marilyn Lightstone, Art Hindle and Josh Byrne, was filmed on a ranch west of Pincher Creek, Alberta against the backdrop of the Canadian Rockies.

== Synopsis ==
To save her ranch after the accidental death of her husband, Sarah Fellows (Marilyn Lightstone) marries Frank Chase (Art Hindle), the man responsible for the mishap. She and her children move into Frank's house, but Sarah makes it clear that it is only a "marriage of convenience". Deeply resenting the situation, her twelve-year-old son Christopher (Josh Byrne) becomes withdrawn and increasingly obsessed with a renegade black pony that runs unfettered through the valley. Frank realizes that Christopher needs the pony and buys it for him, despite Sarah's strong objections.

== Cast List ==
- Marilyn Lightstone – Sarah Fellows/Chase
- Art Hindle – Frank Chase
- Josh Byrne – Christopher Fellows
- Kelsey McLeod – Jennifer Fellows
- Murray Ord – Tom Fellows
- Paul Jolicoeur – Arlo Grayson
- Bob Collins – Sheriff Pack
- Tommy Banks – Sam Fletcher
- Mark Kay – Store Keeper
- Phillip Clark – Minister
- Jack Goth – Judge
- Ron Tucker – Blacksmith
- Roberta Meili – Sam Fletcher's Daughter

== List of Awards ==
CFTA Award – Best Drama, 1983

== See also ==
- List of films about horses
