= Mozart Decoded =

- DVD cover
- Written by: Kevin Sullivan
- Directed by: Kevin Sullivan
- Theme music composer: Peter Breiner
- Country of origin: Canada
- Original language: English

Production
- Producer: Trudy Grant
- Running time: 50 minutes (approx.)

Mozart Decoded is a 2008 documentary about the life of Wolfgang Amadeus Mozart produced by Sullivan Entertainment. The film was made as a follow-up to Sullivan Entertainment's Magic Flute Diaries and uses a lot of the same visual material. The program premiered on December 20, 2008, on A-Channel in Canada.

== Synopsis ==
A detailed look the life of Wolfgang Amadeus Mozart, Mozart Decoded starts with Mozart's upbringing and follows his life through his success and affiliations. A priority of this documentary is finding out what motivated Mozart's work and how organizations like the Freemasons impacted his most popular operas.
