= Out of the Shadows (2012 film) =

- DVD cover
- Directed by: Kevin Sullivan
- Written by: Kevin Sullivan
- Produced by: Trudy Grant
- Narrated by: Donald Sutherland
- Music by: James Mark Stewart
- Release date: January 24, 2012
- Running time: 55 minutes
- Country: Canada
- Language: English

Out of the Shadows is a 2012 documentary produced by Sullivan Entertainment. The documentary features Joris Dik as he works toward re-attributing ‘Portrait of an Old Man with a Beard’ as a Rembrandt painting. The results of the process documented in the film were announced on December 2, 2011, as the Rembrandt Research Project classified the ‘Old Man’ as a Rembrandt. The film is narrated by Donald Sutherland.

== Synopsis ==
Art historians and scientists have joined forces, enabling new details about paintings to be exposed. Using cutting edge x-ray techniques, art historians are now able to see beneath the surface of famous pieces of art. The combination of new data and expert knowledge of artists’ methods allows the Rembrandt Research Project and a group of material scientists to make startling new discoveries.

In addition to Rembrandt's “Old Man”, the film explores scientific study of “Patch of Grass” by Vincent Van Gogh, “The Armourers Shop” by David Teniers and two medieval religious relics. These studies conducted by esteemed scientists such as Dr. Joris Dik from the University of Delft, Dr. D Peter Siddons from the Brookhaven National Laboratory and Dr. Arthur Woll from Cornell University use innovative and non-invasive x-ray and 3D imaging techniques to achieve a greater understanding of how these incredible works were created. Out of the Shadows reveals how, for the first time, modern science is making it possible to step back in time and trace the hands of some of the world's greatest artists as they breathed life into their masterpieces one layer of paint at a time.
