= Anne of Green Gables (1985 film) =

1985 film

- DVD cover
- Genre: Drama; Family
- Based on: Anne of Green Gables by Lucy Maud Montgomery
- Written by: Kevin Sullivan; Joe Wiesenfeld
- Directed by: Kevin Sullivan
- Starring: Megan Follows; Colleen Dewhurst; Richard Farnsworth; Patricia Hamilton; Marilyn Lightstone; Schuyler Grant; Jonathan Crombie
- Theme music composer: Hagood Hardy
- Country of origin: Canada
- Original language: English
- No. of episodes: 2

Production
- Producers: Ian McDougall; Kevin Sullivan
- Running time: 199 minutes
- Budget: $3.5 million

Original release
- Network: CBC
- Release: 1 December – 2 December 1985

Related
- Anne of Green Gables: The Sequel (1987)

Anne of Green Gables is a 1985 Canadian made-for-television drama film based on the 1908 novel of the same name by Canadian author Lucy Maud Montgomery, and is the first in a series of four films. The film stars Megan Follows in the title role of Anne Shirley and was produced and directed by Kevin Sullivan for the Canadian Broadcasting Corporation. It was released theatrically in Iran, Israel, Europe, and Japan.

The film aired on CBC Television as a two-part mini-series on 1 and 2 December 1985. Both parts of the film were among the highest-rated programs of any genre ever to air on a Canadian television network. On February 17, 1986, the film aired on PBS in the US on the series WonderWorks. The film achieved high ratings in the United Kingdom when it aired on New Year’s Day in 1987.

== Plot ==
Anne Shirley, an orphan, lives with the Hammond family in Nova Scotia. After Mr. Hammond dies of a heart attack, she is sent back to the orphanage by Mrs. Hammond and is later adopted by a family in Prince Edward Island. She is met at the train station by the elderly Matthew Cuthbert, who is surprised to find her there. Matthew and his sister Marilla had originally requested a boy to help them on their farm, Green Gables, but Anne was sent to them by mistake.

Marilla puts Anne "on trial" before deciding whether to keep her or send her back. Anne soon loses her temper with Marilla's friend and town gossip Rachel Lynde, who criticizes her looks and red hair. Preferring to return to the orphanage, Anne refuses to apologize, but Matthew convinces her to do so in order to remain at Green Gables. Rachel accepts the apology and suggests to Marilla that Anne attend a Sunday School picnic so she can meet other children. At the picnic, Anne becomes "bosom" friends with Diana Barry from across the pond. Gilbert Blythe, a future classmate, shows an interest in Anne. At school, Gilbert tries to get Anne's attention by making fun of her red hair and calling her "Carrots". Angered, Anne smashes a slate over his head. She vows never to forgive Gilbert and tries to salvage her pride by dyeing her hair black. However, it instead turns green. After learning what happened, a bemused Marilla decides that Anne will stay at Green Gables.

Anne invites Diana to a tea party, where she accidentally serves currant wine instead of raspberry cordial and gets Diana drunk. Diana's mother, Mrs. Barry, thinks the mix-up was intentional and forbids the girls from seeing each other again. Meanwhile, Miss Muriel Stacey becomes the new Avonlea schoolteacher. She wants Anne to join a special class for students who want to take the entrance exam for Queen's Academy in Charlottetown.

While Marilla is away at a political event, Diana arrives in a panic and tells Anne and Matthew that her little sister Minnie May is sick with croup. Anne treats the girl with ipecac and saves her life. Mrs. Barry is grateful and invites Anne to a Christmas ball in Carmody overnight as an apology for forbidding her to see Diana. Anne sees Gilbert at the dance but is not willing to befriend him. She also meets Diana's aunt, Josephine Barry, who is intrigued by Anne. Josephine invites the girls to visit her mansion in Charlottetown, where Anne takes the Queen's entrance exam.

In Avonlea, Anne and her friends recreate Alfred Tennyson's The Lady of Shalott, with Anne playing the role of Elaine the Lily Maid. While Anne floats down the river, her boat springs a leak and sinks, leaving her helplessly clinging to a bridge. Gilbert comes rowing by and rescues her, then reveals they have tied for first place on the Queen's entrance exam. He asks her to forgive him for what he said before and insists he wants to be her friend. Anne is grateful to Gilbert for the rescue, but refuses to forgive him for making fun of her.

Anne heads to Charlottetown to continue her education at Queen's and obtain a teacher's licence. She finds out that the graduate who receives the highest mark in English literature wins the Avery scholarship, $250 for four years, which she plans to use to get an arts degree at Redmond College. When the results come in, Anne has won the Avery. At Avonlea, she finds out that Gilbert's father cannot afford to send him to college, so he will be teaching at the Avonlea school to earn his way. One evening at dusk, Anne walks in the fields before Matthew, who is tugging on a stubborn cow. Matthew suffers a heart attack and collapses while Anne rushes to his side. Matthew tells Anne how proud he is of her and how much he loves her before he peacefully dies.

Following Matthew's funeral, Marilla overhears Anne sobbing in her room that night and goes to comfort her, saying she did not know what she would have done if Anne had not come and that she loved her as Matthew did, but had trouble showing her true feelings. Marilla considers selling Green Gables since her eyesight is failing. However, Anne tells Marilla she has declined the Avery scholarship. Instead of going to Redmond, she will study by correspondence while teaching in Carmody. Marilla reveals that Gilbert's father was an old beau of hers with whom she quarreled, and she wishes she had forgiven him when she had the chance, hinting to Anne that she should do the same with Gilbert. Later, Gilbert explains that he asked the trustees to let Anne have the Avonlea school and give Carmody to him, so Anne can stay at Green Gables and help Marilla. He will also be taking courses by correspondence and asks for Anne's help in studying. A grateful Anne makes up with Gilbert for good and Gilbert walks Anne home.

== Cast ==
- Megan Follows – Anne Shirley
- Colleen Dewhurst – Marilla Cuthbert
- Richard Farnsworth – Matthew Cuthbert
- Patricia Hamilton – Rachel Lynde
- Marilyn Lightstone – Miss Stacy
- Schuyler Grant – Diana Barry
- Jonathan Crombie – Gilbert Blythe
- Charmion King – Aunt Josephine Barry
- Jackie Burroughs – Amelia Evans
- Rosemary Radcliffe – Mrs. Barry
- Joachim Hansen – John Sadler
- Christiane Krüger – Mrs. Allan
- Cedric Smith – Rev. Allan
- Paul Brown – Mr. Phillips
- Miranda de Pencier – Josie Pye
- Trish Nettleton – Jane Andrews
- Jennifer Inch – Ruby Gillis
- Jayne Eastwood – Mrs. Hammond
- Dawn Greenhalgh – Mrs. Cadbury
- Jack Mather – Station Master
- Samantha Langevin – Mrs. Blewett
- Vivian Reis – Mrs. Spencer
- Mag Ruffman – Alice Lawson
- Sean McCann – Dr. O'Reilly
- Roxolana Roslak – Madame Selitsky
- Robert Haley – Professor
- Robert Collins – Mr. Barry
- Morgan Chapman – Minne May Barry
- David Roberts – Tom
- Nancy Beatty – Essie
- David Hughes – Thomas Lynde
- Wendy Lyon – Prissy Andrews
- Zack Ward – Moody Spurgeon MacPherson
- Anna Ferguson – Punch Woman
- Rex Southgate – Section Head
- Julianna Saxton – Pink Woman
- Molly Thom – Lace Woman
- Jennifer Irwin – Student
- Sandra Scott – Mrs. Harrington
- Peter Sturgess – Porter
- Ray Ireland – Mr. Hammond
- Martha Maloney – Fairview Nurse
- Stuart Hamilton – Mme. Selitsky's Accompanist

== Production ==
Kevin Sullivan adapted the novel into his own screenplay, collaborating with industry veteran Joe Wiesenfeld. Sullivan developed a co-production between the CBC and PBS in order to film Anne of Green Gables. Sullivan amalgamated many of Montgomery's episodes into the film's plot. While the film diverged from Montgomery's original, he relied on strong characterizations and visuals in order to render the story for a contemporary audience. The script also borrows ideas from the 1934 film version.

Primary locations for filming the movie included Prince Edward Island; Stouffville, Ontario; Jacksons Point, Ontario; and Westfield Heritage Village near the Flamborough village of Rockton. Filming was done over a consecutive ten-week shoot. Sullivan used several locations as Green Gables farm and combined them to appear as one property.

The original film and sequels (including Road to Avonlea and the animated Anne films and series covering over 130 hours of production) have been seen in almost every country around the world. The films have now been translated and seen in more places than even the original novels.

During filming of the original movies an open casting call was held throughout Canada in order to find a young actress to play Anne Shirley. Katharine Hepburn recommended that her great niece, Schuyler Grant, play the role of Anne Shirley. Director Kevin Sullivan liked Grant's performance and wanted to give her the role. However, broadcast executives were resistant to cast an American as a Canadian icon. Schuyler Grant ended up playing Anne's best friend, Diana, and Anne Shirley was ultimately played by Megan Follows.

In her first audition, Megan Follows came highly recommended, but she was quickly dismissed by Kevin Sullivan. For her second audition, after a turbulent morning leading up to her audition, a frantic Megan made a much better impression and was given the role.

== Sequels and spin-off TV series ==
=== Film series ===
In 1987, Anne of Green Gables: The Sequel (also called Anne of Avonlea) was released. The sequel is a conglomeration of Montgomery's novels Anne of Avonlea, Anne of the Island, and Anne of Windy Poplars. Megan Follows, Colleen Dewhurst, Jonathan Crombie, Schuyler Grant, and Patricia Hamilton all reprised their roles.

The third film, Anne of Green Gables: The Continuing Story, aired in 2000 with the intent of bringing Anne into a time frame that had been developed over the years in the spin-off series Road to Avonlea. As such, the plot disregarded Anne's House of Dreams – the corresponding Anne novel – in favor of an original story not featured in Montgomery's series. Follows, Crombie, and Grant returned for the final time as Anne, Gilbert, and Diana.

In 2008, the fourth entry in the series, a prequel film entitled Anne of Green Gables: A New Beginning was completed, starring Barbara Hershey, Shirley MacLaine, and Rachel Blanchard, with Hannah Endicott-Douglas playing the young Anne.

==== Spin-off series ====
The first two Anne films generated the spin-off television series Road to Avonlea (1990–1996), starring Sarah Polley. The show explored the lives of residents in the town of Avonlea, drawing inspiration from Montgomery's work beyond the Anne books. The main characters and early episodes were inspired by The Story Girl and The Golden Road, with many other episodes based on short stories from Chronicles of Avonlea and Further Chronicles of Avonlea. Anne did not appear, but other characters, including Gilbert, Marilla, Rachel Lynde, and Miss Stacy, played supporting parts with the same actors reprising their roles. Jackie Burroughs, Cedric Smith, and Mag Ruffman returned as main cast members, but in different roles than the original films.

In 1998, the reunion television special An Avonlea Christmas aired, set in Avonlea during World War I.

=== Other productions ===
From 2000 until 2001, Sullivan Animation produced Anne of Green Gables: The Animated Series consisting of 26 half-hour episodes. The series was developed for PBS and each episode contained an educational and/or moral component. In 2005, Sullivan Animation also produced the feature-length animated film Anne: Journey to Green Gables which is an imaginative, whimsical prequel to Sullivan's live action Anne of Green Gables film.

A year after the mini-series originally aired, Canadian comedy duo Wayne and Shuster created and starred in a parody entitled Sam of Green Gables, in which a curmudgeonly old man named Sam is sent to Green Gables instead of Anne.

== Awards and nominations ==
The film swept the 1986 Gemini Awards, winning the following:

- Best Dramatic Miniseries
- Best Actress in a Single Dramatic Program or Miniseries: Megan Follows
- Best Supporting Actor: Richard Farnsworth
- Best Supporting Actress: Colleen Dewhurst
- Best Writing (TV Adaptation): Kevin Sullivan and Joe Wiesenfeld
- Best Music Composition: Hagood Hardy
- Best Costume Design: Martha Mann
- Best Photography: René Ohashi
- Best Production Design/Art Direction: Carol Spier
- Most Popular Program

The film was also nominated for Best Direction in a Dramatic Program or Mini-Series and Best Picture Editing in a Dramatic Program or Series.

The series also won an Emmy Award in 1986, for Outstanding Children's Program.

Other awards

- Peabody Award – to Kevin Sullivan for Outstanding Contribution to Broadcasting in the United States, 1986
- Prix Jeunesse: Best Drama, 1988 (Germany)
- TV Guide Award: Most Popular Program, 1986
- Grand Award – International Film and Television, New York
- Emily Award – American Film and Video Festival, 1986
- Macleans Medal of Merit – Maclean's Magazine, 1986
- Chris Award – Columbus International Film Festival, 1986
- Silver Hugo Award – Chicago International Film Festival, 1986
- International TV Movie Festival: Nomination for Movie of the Year, 1986
- American TV Critics Award: Best Drama, 1986
- Grant Award: Best TV Program, Houston International Film Festival, 1987
- Golden Gate Award – San Francisco Film Festival, 1986
- CRTA Award: Outstanding Personal Achievement in TV, 1986
- Ohio State Award – Performing Arts and Humanities Award, 1987
- First Prize – Odyssey Institute Media Award, 1987
- The Ruby Slipper: Best Television Special, 1987
- Parents Choice Award – Parents Choice for TV Programmings, 1987
- Excellence in Programming – Award from Association of Catholic Communications in Canada, 1987
- Golden Apple Award – Best of National Educational Film and Video Festival, 1987

== Home media ==
The Anne of Green Gables series was released on DVD in a collector's edition set on February 5, 2008 in the US, April 29, 2008 in Canada and Japan and on September 22, 2010 in Hungary. The set is the most comprehensive edition of all three movies ever released. In addition to the series, it also includes several DVD extras such as feature length commentary from director Kevin Sullivan and Stefan Scaini, 2 New Documentaries: L.M. Montgomery's Island and Kevin Sullivan's Classic featuring new cast and crew interviews, missing scenes, lost footage and a condensed, 10-minute version of the missing "Road to Avonlea" episode "Marilla Cuthbert's Death".

In 2016, Sullivan Entertainment announced it would launch their own streaming service called Gazebo TV that would feature the Anne of Green Gables series among other titles produced by the company. The service launched in early 2017.

== Lawsuits ==
In 1908, Lucy Maud Montgomery signed a contract with the L.C. Page & Company publishing house in Boston that permitted them to publish all of her books for 5 years on the same terms: the main terms were a 10% royalty and world rights to all of the author's books; plus it also included the right to publish all of her future works. The relationship with Pageant actually spanned nearly ten years and resulted in the publication of nine novels and collections of short stories. However, when Montgomery contracted with a Canadian publisher (McClelland, Goodchild and Stewart), L.C. Page claimed that they had the exclusive rights to her new books and threatened to sue her. Montgomery instead took L.C. Page to court to recover withheld royalties.

The lawsuit resulted in a settlement in 1919 whereby L.C. Page bought out all of Montgomery's rights to all of her novels published by them. The settlement excluded any reversionary rights that might become due for the benefit of either her or her heirs if such rights were to become enacted. The settlement paid Montgomery a flat sum of $18,000; at the time an amount she would have expected to see earned from her works during her lifetime.

Sullivan purchased dramatic rights from Montgomery's heirs in 1984, believing that they owned reversionary rights that had come into place as a result of changes to the copyright act subsequent to Montgomery's death.

After Sullivan's films were successful around the world and brought legions of tourists to Prince Edward Island, the Montgomery heirs established an Anne of Green Gables Licensing Authority with the Province of Prince Edward Island to control trademarks to preserve Montgomery's works, through the mechanism of official trademarks. The heirs and the AGGLA became successful at asserting control over the booming Anne-themed tourist industry that the province enjoyed, because of the lack of clarity about the different protections afforded by copyright, trademark and official marks in Canada.

AGGLA and the heirs tried to assert control over trademarks Sullivan had established to their various Anne movies (Anne of Green Gables, Anne of Avonlea, Anne of Green Gables—the Continuing Story) and Road to Avonlea properties both in Canada, the US and Japan.

A Japanese court then determined that the heirs were not entitled to the reversionary rights that they claimed they had sold to Sullivan and that the AGGLA was set up for pursuing private interests and not for serving public interests such as maintaining or managing the value, fame or reputation of the literary work, the author or even the main character of Anne. The Court determined that the AGGLA was the heirs' private profit-seeking enterprise as far as its activities were concerned.

Sullivan and the heirs came into further conflict during the 1990s. Sullivan was sued by the heirs. Their contractual agreement with Sullivan said that he would pay them a flat $425,000 (CAD) fee for the right to adapt the first book (and another $100,000 to do the second movie, Anne of Avonlea), plus 10% of the profits of Anne 1 and 5% of the profits of Anne 2. The contract also gave them the right to examine Sullivan Entertainment's financial records. However, when Sullivan claimed that neither of the movies had earned a net profit and (the heirs assert) refused to allow them to audit his books, they served a claim against him. Sullivan argued that the heirs and the AGGLA had enjoined the films by usurping the Sullivan trademarks and drastically reduced the profitability of the ventures. The heirs staged a press conference in 1998 at exactly the time when Sullivan was about to close a public offering to take his company public, to force Sullivan to pay them further receipts. The offering however was pulled by the underwriters and Sullivan counter-sued for libel, insisting that the heirs should pay damages of $55 million to all parties involved. A Superior Court of Ontario judge dismissed his suit on January 19, 2004. The Montgomery heirs subsequently dropped their claim for Sullivan to pay them any royalties. However, a settlement between Sullivan, the Montgomery heirs and the AGGLA was reached in 2006 to deal with all of their outstanding disagreements. Although Kevin Sullivan's works were initially based upon the works of Montgomery, Sullivan developed most of his successful Anne-related film properties (Anne of Avonlea, Anne -the Continuing Story, Anne – A New Beginning and Road to Avonlea) based on original material, not directly adapted from Montgomery's books. Many questions have been raised in court as to the author's heirs' rights in her copyright. The heirs have tried to extend the copyright in Montgomery's unpublished works until 2017 but lost that opportunity in 2004 when the Canadian Parliament rejected the provision they had pursued so ardently for the unpublished works of dead authors. In a Japanese court decision which addressed the heirs' challenge to the validity of Sullivan's ownership of Japanese trademark's in the movie property, the Japanese High Court commented on the heirs' entitlement to reversionary copyright which formed the basis of the rights that the family claimed to have sold to Sullivan. The Court stated that the heirs' reversionary copyright was non-existent and that there was no need for Sullivan or any other entity to account to the heirs for the use of the trademark in Japan.

The Court stated: "It is not clear from a legal point of view why permission from the heirs of the author or its related entity the Anne of Green Gables Licensing (AGGLA) authority was necessary."

The Japanese Court also extensively scrutinized whether the copyright in the book Anne of Green Gables had ever devolved to the heirs and called for extensive filing of evidence on this point. Sullivan filed an original 1919 agreement between Montgomery and L.C. Page & Co. which specifically excluded the heirs' reversionary claims. Montgomery sold all of her publishing and copyright to her series of novels, in perpetuity, to her original American publisher in 1919, to the exclusion of her heirs.

The Court further questioned whether the heirs' licensing authority was engaged in activities of sufficient public interest as to qualify as a controlling body of Montgomery's works. The Court stated: "...the possibility cannot be denied that the Anne of Green Gables Licensing Authority is the heirs' private profit-seeking enterprise as far as the activities with which the heirs of the subject case are involved are concerned. It is not proved from the evidence submitted in the subject case that the Anne of Green Gables Licensing Authority is involved in activities of public interest that are sufficient for the Anne of Green Gables Licensing Authority to be qualified as the owner of the registration of the subject mark as a controlling body of the subject literary work."

== Trademark and copyright ==
After recent speculation as to who owned the copyrights and trademarks concerning Anne of Green Gables today, there are principally two entities that control rights relating to Anne of Green Gables. The Anne of Green Gables Licensing Authority (AGGLA – which includes Lucy Maud Montgomery's heirs and the Province of Prince Edward Island) and Sullivan Entertainment (the producers of the well-known films and TV series based on Montgomery's novels).

The Anne of Green Gables Licensing Authority controls certain exclusive trademarks relating to Anne of Green Gables commercial merchandise and service related to Montgomery's literary works and any copyright in the Montgomery books which have not reverted to the public domain.

Sullivan Entertainment Inc, under agreement with the Anne of Green Gables Licensing Authority, retains all of the dramatic copyright and motion picture copyright in over 125 hours of their original movies, mini-series and television series based on both the Anne and Avonlea series of novels and certain trade-marks relating to Sullivan sourced Anne of Green Gables merchandise and services. Sullivan's use of the Anne of Green Gables trademarks extends from motion picture products and books, DVDs, CDs etc. to all commercial merchandise related to Sullivan's films and television series based on their visual images, costume and production designs, settings, themes and original characters. Sullivan Entertainment also solely controls the commercial trademarks to Anne of Avonlea, Anne of the Island, and Road to Avonlea.

== See also ==
- Canadian World in Ashibetsu, Japan
