= Kay Tremblay =

Canadian actress (1914–2005)

- Born: Katherine McAllister; 13 March 1914; Glasgow, Strathclyde, Scotland, UK
- Died: 9 August 2005 (aged 91); Stratford, Ontario, Canada
- Occupation: Actress
- Years active: 1964–2001

Kay Tremblay (13 March 1914 – 9 August 2005) was a Canadian film actress, also appearing on television and theatre. She was best known for her Gemini Award-winning role of Great Aunt Eliza Ward on Road to Avonlea.

== Biography ==
Born in Scotland, she began her career with the George Balanchine Ballet at Theatre Royal in London. Tremblay arrived in Canada after her marriage and began her Canadian artistic career in 1954. Kay Tremblay lived in a thatched cottage at 46a high street, Flore, Northants, UK, from the 1960s. She named the property "The Farthings" as she said this was all she had left after she purchased it.

== Career ==
Her Canadian career was mainly in television, but she worked briefly at the Stratford Festival from 1989 to 1990. She won a Gemini Award in 1997 for Best Performance by an Actress in a Featured Supporting Role in a Dramatic Series in Road to Avonlea, and a Gemini nomination in 1989 for Best Guest Performance in a Series by an Actor or Actress in Night Heat.

== Death ==
Tremblay died on 9 August 2005 at the age of 91.

== Filmography ==
| Year | Title | Role | Notes |
|---|---|---|---|
| 1964 | Phoebe | | |
| 1970 | Flesh Feast | Woman in park | |
| 1977 | The Phoenix and the Carpet | Amelia | Episode: "The Hole in the Carpet" |
| 1979 | Thomas and Sarah | Mrs. Derwent | Episode: "Made in Heaven" |
| 1980 | Oh! Heavenly Dog | Lady Hermione | |
| 1985 | The Cuckoo Bird | Customer | TV movie |
| 1985 | The Beachcombers | Aunt Mary | Episode: "You Won't Miss It" |
| 1985–1988 | Night Heat | Various | 6 episodes |
| 1986 | The Marriage Bed | | TV movie |
| 1986 | Hot Shots | Rose | Episode: "The Family Jules" |
| 1987 | Friday the 13th | Amanda | Episode: "Root of All Evil" |
| 1987 | Street Legal | Mrs. Greco | Episode: "Even Lawyers Sing the Blues" |
| 1988 | Diamonds | | Episode: "When the Wind Blows" |
| 1988 | Shadow Dancing | Sophie Beaumont | |
| 1989 | Renegades | Old Woman | |
| 1990 | Friday the 13th | Mrs. Cromwell | Episode: "Repetition" |
| 1990 | E.N.G. | Old Woman | Episode: "Striking Out" |
| 1990 | Rin Tin Tin: K-9 Cop | | Episode: "Over the Hill Gang" |
| 1990 | Dog House | Iris Slack | TV series |
| 1990 | The Hitchhiker | | Episode: "New Dawn" |
| 1990 | The Admiral and the Princess | Renee (voice) | TV movie |
| 1990–1996 | Road to Avonlea | Eliza Ward | 22 episodes |
| 1991 | Sam & Me | Mrs. Rohrlich | |
| 1991 | Love & Murder | Receptioinist | |
| 1992 | The Shower | Pearl | |
| 1993–1995 | X-Men | Annalee, Cindy (voice) | Episodes: "Captive Hearts", "One Man's Worth", "Have Yourself a Morlock Little X-Mas" |
| 1995 | The NeverEnding Story | Mrs. Large Head (voice) | Episode: "To Save Falkor" |
| 1995 | Falling for You | Mrs. Stringer | TV movie |
| 1995 | National Lampoon's Senior Trip | Mrs. Winston | |
| 1995 | TekWar | Mrs. Hastings | Episode: "Cyberhunt" |
| 1995 | Side Effects | Lady with Dog | Episode: "Paying the Price" |
| 1995 | Remember Me | Phoebe Sprague | TV movie |
| 1996 | Traders | Linda McGregor | Episode: "Chaos Theory" |
| 1996 | Are You Afraid of the Dark? | Marjorie | Episode: "The Tale of the Jagged Sign" |
| 1996 | First Degree | Estelle Sarner | Video |
| 1996 | Lulu | | |
| 1997 | Goosebumps | Mimi | Episode: "An Old Story" |
| 1997 | Wind at My Back | Jessie Buchanan | Episode: "A Meeting of the Clan"; Episode: "Smiling Through" |
| 1998 | Moonlight Becomes You | | TV movie |
| 1998 | The Real Howard Spitz | Theodora Winkle | |
| 1998 | Happy Christmas, Miss King | Eliza Ward | TV movie |
| 1999 | Storm of the Century | False Mother | TV miniseries |
| 2000 | Relic Hunter | Older Woman | Episode: "Afterlife and Death" |
| 2000 | Santa Who? | Elderly Woman | TV movie |
| 2001 | Who Is Cletis Tout? | Old Mrs. Stanton | |
