= By Way of the Stars =

- DVD cover
- Based on: The Long Journey of Lukas B by Willi Fährmann
- Written by: Deborah Nathan; Helen Asimakis
- Directed by: Allan King
- Starring: Zachary Bennett; Gema Zamprogna
- Theme music composer: John Welsman
- Country of origin: Canada
- Original language: English

Production
- Producers: Trudy Grant; Brian Parker; Kevin Sullivan
- Cinematography: Manfred Guthe
- Editors: Gordon McClellan; Mairin Wilkinson
- Production companies: Iduna Film Produktiongesellschaft; Sullivan Entertainment

Original release
- Release: December 26, 1992 – January 1, 1993

By Way of the Stars is a Canadian adventure television mini-series co-produced in 1992 by Sullivan Entertainment and German Beta-Taurus Kirch Group, that begins in 19th century Prussia, then travels through post-U.S. Civil War Charleston to the 'Canadas' and the West. It is a young boy's version of "Dances with Wolves". The six-hour mini-series is based on a popular German children's novel called "The Long Journey of Lukas B." The movie was produced in association with ZDF, at the time, Germany's largest Broadcaster, CBC and Disney Channel. This mini-series was filmed entirely in Uxbridge, Ontario. The production was nominated for 2 Gemini awards.

== Synopsis ==
Set in 1865, the story is about a thirteen-year-old boy from Prussia, named Lukas, who moves to America to escape family problems and a dangerous enemy. Along his journey he meets a young girl named Ursula and the two children struggle to survive the difficult frontier lifestyle.

== Cast List ==
- Zachary Bennett – Lukas Bienmann
- Gema Zamprogna – Ursula von Knabig
- Christian Kohlund – Karl Bienmann
- Michael Mahonen – Ben Davis
- Hannes Jaenicke – Otto von Lebrecht
- Jan Rubeš - Nathan
- Dominique Sanda - Christina von Knabig
- Frances Bay - Annie Pyle
- Tantoo Cardinal - Franoise
- John Neville - Professor Billby
- R. H. Thomson - Priest
- Eric Schweig - Black Thunder
- Gordon Tootoosis - Cree Chief
- Anja Kruse - Maria Bienmann
- Dietmar Schönherr - Friedrich Brunneck
- Günther Maria Halmer - Heinrich von Knabig
- Volker Lechtenbrink - Jürgen
- Toby Proctor - Franz
- Albert Millaire - Renauld
- Miroslav Donutil - Albert

== Home media ==
The mini-series was released on DVD as a cut down 2-hour versions in 2005. In 2012 the full 6 hour version was released on DVD. In addition, the mini-series was also made available for streaming in the digital format on Sullivan Entertainment's Gazebo TV.

== List of Awards ==
- 2 Gemini Nominations – Best Direction in a Series (Allan King), Best Original Music Score for a Series, 1993
- Bronze Plaque Award – Columbus International Film Festival, 1993 (U.S.)
