= Under the Piano =

- DVD cover
- Genre: Drama
- Written by: Blair Ferguson
- Directed by: Stefan Scaini
- Starring: Amanda Plummer; Megan Follows; Teresa Stratas
- Theme music composer: Christopher Dedrick
- Country of origin: Canada
- Original language: English

Production
- Executive producer: Trudy Grant
- Producers: Nicholas Gray; Kevin Sullivan
- Cinematography: Robert Saad
- Editor: Mairin Wilkinson
- Running time: c. 92 minutes
- Production company: Sullivan Entertainment

Original release
- Release: 1995

Under the Piano is a 1995 television film directed by Stefan Scaini and features Kevin Sullivan as executive producer. The film follows the story of one woman’s overwhelming faith in her talented but emotionally defenceless sister. The film starred Megan Follows and Amanda Plummer as the sisters and opera singer Teresa Stratas as their mother. Stratas won a Gemini Award as best supporting actress for her performance.

The film is loosely based on the life experiences of Dolly and Henrietta Giardini. Sullivan had seen their story on an episode of 20/20 and was moved by the potential of it. Henrietta was born an autistic savant; though her mental/emotional faculties have never fully developed, she possesses an extraordinary gift for memorization and for music. The two sisters lives were crucial to each other's survival as Dolly was handicapped, born with a paralyzed arm.

== Plot summary ==
The film is set in the 1940s and 1950s. Franny Basilio is determined to help her musically gifted autistic sister Rosetta have a life of her own. Their mother Regina, who gave up a promising career as an opera singer to raise her children, refuses to acknowledge Rosetta’s talent and believes she will never be capable of looking after herself. Franny vehemently disagrees with her mother, which has caused friction between them since she was a child. Eventually, Regina’s bitterness, ignorance and desire for acknowledgement of her own talent cause a rift between her and her daughters. Franny ultimately moves out of the house causing Rosetta to hurt herself in a desperate cry for help. Rosetta is hospitalized and assessed by doctors who recommend to Regina that her daughter be lobotomized for her own good. Franny must summon all of her courage in order to prevent her mother from allowing Rosetta to have the operation and be committed to an institution for the rest of her life.

== Cast ==
- Amanda Plummer – Franny Basilio
- Megan Follows – Rosetta Basilio
- Teresa Stratas – Regina Basilio
- James Carroll – Nick
- John Juliani – Frank
- Jackie Richardson – Mrs. Syms
- Richard Blackburn – Dr. Banman
- Dan Lett – Dr. Harkness
- Judith Orban – Hazel
- Andrew Tarbet – Orderly
- Deborah Grover – Nurse Thompson
- Richard McMillan – Dr. Davison
- Tara Macri – Michelle
- Louisa Martin – Michelle's mother
- Simone Rosenberg – Young Violet
- Andrew Sardella – Tommy 13
- Anita LaSelva – Juliet 24
- Mary Kelly – Mrs. Simpson
- Benjamin Plener – Boy
- Vince Marino – Store owner
- Marie-Hélène Fontaine – Nurse
- François Klanfer – Priest 1955
- Costin Manu – Peddlar
- Colin O'Meara – Rick
- Susan Tsagkaris – Leonora
- Fran Vallee – Mme Benoit
- Nicky Guadagni – Miss Evans
- Mari Trainor – Marge
- Chris Benson – Bill

== List of awards ==
- Cable Ace Nomination – Best International Dramatic Special or Series/Movie or Miniseries, 1996
- 3 Gemini Awards – Best Costume Design, Best Supporting Actress in a TV Movie (Teresa Stratas), Best Sound, 1996
- 2 Gemini Nominations – Best TV Movie, Best Direction in a Dramatic Program (Stefan Scaini), 1996
