= Marilyn Lightstone =

Canadian actress and writer (1940-)

- Born: 28 June 1940 (age 86); Montreal, Quebec, Canada
- Education: Baron Byng High School; McGill University; National Theatre School
- Occupations: Actress; writer
- Years active: 1965–present
- Known for: Anne of Green Gables; Anne of Green Gables: The Sequel; Road to Avonlea

Marilyn Lightstone (born 28 June 1940) is a Canadian stage, film and television actress and writer.

== Early life and education ==
Born in Montreal, Quebec, Marilyn Lightstone graduated from Baron Byng High School in 1957. She went on to attend McGill University where she received a bachelor's degree. Lightstone then attended and graduated from the National Theatre School.

== Career ==
She starred on Canadian television as Miss Stacey in Anne of Green Gables and Road to Avonlea. She has won two Canadian Film Awards; a Genie for Best Actress in Lies My Father Told Me and a Genie for Best Supporting Actress for In Praise of Older Women. She won an award for Best Actress at the Moscow International Film Festival for The Tin Flute.

Her stage roles include Goneril in King Lear at the Lincoln Centre in New York, Mash in Chekov's The Seagull at the Stratford Festival and Leah in The Dybbuk. In 1976, Lightstone starred in a play produced by Moses Znaimer, Miss Margarida. She performed in the lead role in the play Tamara to audiences in New York and Los Angeles, another Znaimer production.

She has made several guest appearances on television series and rendered her voice for radio drama, voice-overs and commercials as well as providing voices for animated cartoons.

Lightstone is a painter and writer, and formerly the brand announcer for Canadian arts television network Bravo!. She has served as Associate Producer and Co-director of Spoken Art and has hosted Playwrights and Screenwriters.

She has written scripts for television series and a novel, Rogues and Vagabonds. She has written a collection of songs, Miss Lightstone Sings and her interfaith song The Light Shines All Over the World has been released as a music video.

She hosts an evening program, Nocturne, on Classical 96, Moses Znaimer's classical music radio station in Toronto.

== Personal life ==
Marilyn Lightstone is in a long-term relationship with Moses Znaimer, who is the current head of ZoomerMedia. They met at McGill University at the McGill Player's Club in the early 1960's.

She has said she is still interested in acting, even on stage, but only in what she would consider "meaningful" roles. As of 2008, she has said she is currently interested in mainly painting and photography.

== Filmography ==
=== Film ===
Year	Title	Role	Notes
1975	Lies My Father Told Me	Annie Herman	
1978	In Praise of Older Women	Klari	
1981	Heavy Metal	Queen (voice)	Segment: "Den"
1982	Love	Marilyn	Segment: "Love on Your Birthday"
1983	The Tin Flute (Bonheur d'occasion)	Rose-Anna Lacasse	
1983	Spasms	Dr. Claire Rothman	
1983	The Wild Pony	Sarah Chase	
1984	The Surrogate	Dr. Foreman	
1986	Gobots: Battle of the Rock Lords	Crasher (voice)	
1990	Abraxas, Guardian of the Universe	Abraxas' Answer Box (voice)	
1992	Timescape	Madame Iovine	
1995	Iron Eagle on the Attack	Dr. Francis Gully	
2012	My Titanic Uncle	Narrator (voice)	Short

=== Television ===
Year	Title	Role	Notes
1966	L'Heure du Concert	She	"Toi"
1967	Festival	Rosie	"Slow Dance on the Killing Ground"
1972	Norman Corwin Presents		"Please, No Flowers"
1973	Program X		"The Late Man"
1976	Peep Show		"Outcasts"
1977	The New Avengers	Ranoff	"Forward Base"
1978	King of Kensington	Sharon Rockwell	"The Old Flame"
1979	Mary and Joseph: A Story of Faith	Anna	TV film
1981	Titans	Nefertiti	"Nefertiti"
1983	The Littlest Hobo	Dr. Fagan	"The Loneliest Day of the Week"
1984	Heathcliff & the Catillac Cats	Sonja/Grandma (voice)	TV series
1984-85	Challenge of the GoBots	Crasher; others (voice)	TV series
1985	Anne of Green Gables	Muriel Stacey	TV miniseries
1985	ABC Weekend Special	Skin Horse / Nana (voice)	"The Velveteen Rabbit"
1985	The 13 Ghosts of Scooby-Doo	Astrid (voice)	"Scooby in Kwackyland"
1985	Night Heat	Mrs. Loris	"Snow White"
1986	Blind Justice	Dr. Lathrop	TV film
1986	Cagney & Lacey	Gerilee Thackeray	"Exit Stage Center"
1986	Wildfire	Jude (voice)	"Secret of Sinti Magic"
1986	Pound Puppies	Lady Belveshire (voice)	"From Wags to Riches"
1986	Danger Bay	Sister Sophia	"Thursday's Child"
1986	Cheers	Leeza	"Dance, Diane, Dance"
1986-88	Dennis the Menace	Martha Wilson / Alice Mitchell (voice)	Main role
1987	Amen	Prue	"The Divorce Lawyer"
1987	Starman	Lainie Fine	"Starscape: Parts 1 & 2"
1987	Anne of Avonlea	Miss Muriel Stacey	TV miniseries
1987	The Real Ghostbusters	Aunt Lois (voice)	"The Spirit of Aunt Lois"
1990-96	Road to Avonlea	Muriel Stacey Pettibone	Recurring role
1991	Dracula: The Series	Mrs. Pfenning	"Sophie, Queen of the Night"
1991	Wish Kid	(voice)	TV series
1992-93	Street Legal	Sunny Bernstein	"Persistence of Vision", "Never Say Die", "Faking It"
1993	E.N.G.	Kay Lundgrigan	"The Big Sleepover"
1994	Ready or Not	Adele	"Family Therapy"
1995	The Neverending Story	Ygramul (voice)	"To Save Falkor"
1999	Psi Factor	Dr. Jenica	"883"
2002	Dennis the Menace in Cruise Control	Alice Mitchell / Martha Wilson (voice)	TV film
2002	Madeline: My Fair Madeline	Miss Higginsbottom (voice)	TV film

== Writer ==
- Shades of Love: Little White Lies (1988)
- The Littlest Hobo (1979)

== Literary works ==
- Rogues & Vagabonds

== Appearances ==
Marilyn Lightstone attended TFcon 2013 as a guest, where she reprised her roles as Crasher and Pathfinder (called Roswell) for a voice actor play.
