= Emmanuel International Canada =

Canadian Christian non-profit organization

- Founded: 1983 (Emmanuel International Canada); 1975 (Emmanuel International)
- Founders: George Middleton & Dorothy Middleton (Emmanuel International)
- Type: non-governmental, non-profit, evangelical Christian organization
- Purpose: Humanitarian
- Location: Stouffville, Ontario, Canada
- Region served: Brazil, Haiti, Malawi, South Africa, Tanzania, Uganda, and the Philippines
- Key people: Richard McGowan (Emmanuel International Canada Executive Director); Michael Botting (Project Coordinator); Lindsay O'Connor (Media Consultant)
- Website: www.eicanada.org

Emmanuel International Canada (EICanada or EIC) is a non-governmental, non-profit, evangelical, interdenominational Christian relief organization. The EIC's goal is to strengthen and assist local churches in developing countries.

== History ==
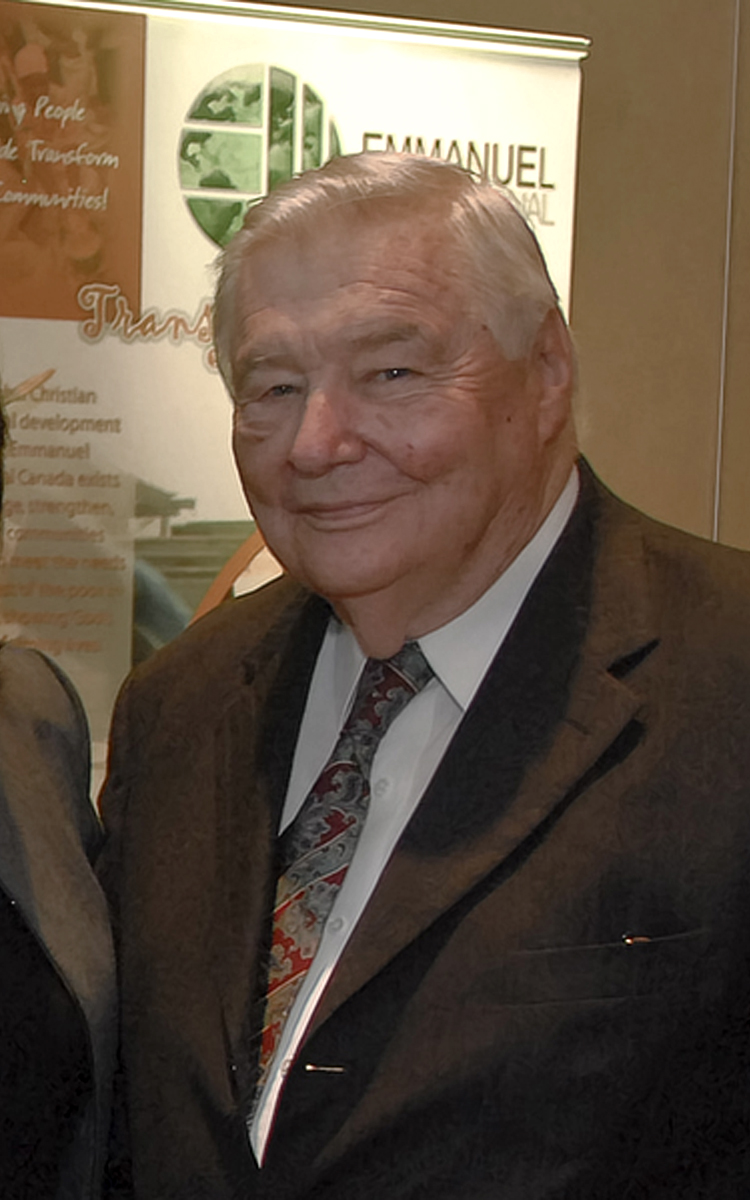
Emmanuel International's founder, George Middleton.

Emmanuel International (EI) is Emmanuel International Canada's parent organization and was founded in 1975 by George Middleton and Dorothea Middleton, a couple who were missionaries to Ethiopia during the Wollo Famine.

In the early days of the organization, EI was involved in sending teams of trained young people overseas to assist relief efforts in developing countries such as Ethiopia and Guatemala. The organization branched out its work to include community development and sustainability projects in countries such as Jamaica, Haiti, and Dominica.

EICanada was formed in 1983 as a national office of Emmanuel International. EICanada functions as a recruiting, fundraising and promotional agency for the overseas work of the whole organization.

== Development Work ==
EICanada's initiatives primarily encompass four main categories: disaster relief, disaster rehabilitation, sustainable community development, and Christian ministries. The organization collaborates with local churches to cater to the needs of rural communities.

=== Notable Projects ===
==== Rainwater Harvesting Project in Tanzania ====
EICanada's Rainwater Harvesting project is a part of its sustainable community development program in Tanzania. In 2007, at the request of the Anglican Diocese of Ruaha, their partner church fellowship in Tanzania, EICanada commenced construction on the project in Uhambingeto, 45 kilometres northeast of the city of Iringa in Iringa Region at the Uhambingeto pre-school and health care centre.

In Tanzania, there are two rainy seasons, a heavy season from March – May and a lighter season from November – January, with long dry seasons in between. The issue for Uhambingeto village (along with many other rural Tanzanian villages) is that there is not a local clean water source in the community. This becomes particularly problematic during the dry season, hindering the effectiveness of the community's health and education systems, and leaving the villagers vulnerable to disease and academic difficulties.

EICanada was able to implement harvesting technology that provided a collection and storage system for the rainwater so it could be used by the schools and the community during dry season. Rainwater is collected off of the roofs of the schools by drain pipes and stored in tanks made of cement bricks, which have attached spout stations for easy access to the supply. The group of tanks that were installed in 2007 can collectively hold a total of 70,000 litres of rainwater. EICanada taught the villagers how to make and take care of this simple technology, as well as how to use the stored water in a responsible way.

The project was successful and as a result, EICanada in partnership with the Diocese of Ruaha was able to provide the residents of Uhambingeto with a clean water source that benefitted the entire community of approximately 10,000 people. In 2010, additional rainwater harvesting tanks were installed at the primary and secondary schools of Uhambingeto, and EICanada is in the process of constructing tanks in other Tanzanian villages.

==== 2010 Haiti Earthquake Relief Program ====
Members of the EICanada emergency response team with a truckload of relief supplies on the ground in Haiti in January 2010.

EICanada has been actively working in Haiti in partnership with the Oeuvre Evangelique Baptist Bethesda (OEBB) fellowship of churches since 1978. In the immediate aftermath of the earthquake on 12 January 2010, EICanada's in-country representatives went right to work distributing relief supplies and assisting with the search and rescue efforts. Within days of the earthquake, an emergency response team was able to be sent from EICanada, under the leadership of the International Director. This emergency response team helped to network and distribute various relief supplies, including food, water, and medicine, to 15,000 people at the OEBB's 10 community centres. EICanada also partnered with ShelterBox, who provided 30 tents to the OEBB, supplying 150 people with desperately needed shelter. An additional 600 tents and tarpaulins were sourced from the Dominican Republic, which were used for sheltering families and providing classroom space for needy schoolchildren. Other EICanada teams were sent to Haiti over the next few months as the relief and rehabilitation efforts continued. During the immediate aftermath of the earthquake, EICanada's donor family responded generously to the urgent need in Haiti, raising funds and donating numerous in-kind gifts of food, water, aid, supplies, and medicine for the organization's relief and rehabilitation program.

2010 Haiti Earthquake Relief Program – Immediate Relief Effort Statistics
- 13 truckloads (weight per truck - 4 tons) of food distributed; 52 tons of food distributed
- 3,000 households received aid - approximately 15,000 people
- items delivered: beans, rice, cornmeal, water, cooking oil, fish, milk powder, tomato paste, pasta
- over 600 tents were distributed; over 3000 people received emergency shelter

In the time since the earthquake, EICanada has remained committed to helping Haitians rebuild their lives and livelihoods in the wake of the disaster and will continue to stand by the Haitian people into the future. During the second stabilization phase of the Haiti Earthquake Relief Program (beginning on 15 April 2010, which will be an ongoing process), EICanada concentrated its rehabilitation efforts in several areas, including:

- Securing vehicles for transporting supplies
- Properly demolishing damaged buildings for sound reconstruction purposes
- Re-opening the OEBB-sponsored primary schools
- Implementing a feeding program for needy primary school students (providing 1800+ students with a meal at least three times weekly)
- Implementing a program to supplement school fees for needy families as well as teaching salaries

The third phase of the Haiti Earthquake Relief program, which began in July 2010, is expected to take at least a few years to complete and focuses on reconstructing damaged and/or destroyed homes, schools and churches within the OEBB network. EICanada is dedicated to supporting and seeing the OEBB and the Haitian people through this process, with a goal to help them, "move from despair to confidence and stability".

In response to the ongoing cholera outbreak, which began in October 2010, EICanada organized public health education clinics, chlorinated clean water stations, preventative hygiene kits, and stockpiles of emergency cholera treatment supplies (oral rehydration salt solution, zinc supplements, etc.) for rural areas where access to established cholera treatment centres is restricted. These initiatives have allowed EICanada to reach and provide aid for 11,000 needy Haitians.

== Christian Ministry ==
Emmanuel International Canada is an inter-denominational evangelical Christian organization. EICanada partners with local churches in its project countries to address and implement practical physical and spiritual solutions for the specific needs of rural communities in developing countries. EICanada's Christian ministry provides the foundation for the organization's development efforts. The organization is committed to meeting the needs of people regardless of their race, gender, age, colour, or religion.

EICanada's Christian ministry projects include church planting, evangelism, leadership development, discipleship, theological education and Bible school training.

== Project Countries & National Offices ==
Emmanuel International has projects in 8 countries around the world: Brazil, Haiti, Malawi, South Africa, Sudan, Tanzania, Uganda and the Philippines. EI's national offices are located in Australia, Brazil, Canada (EICanada), Malawi, the Philippines, the United Kingdom and the United States.

The International Office's role is to manage, administer, and coordinate the affairs of EI around the world in cooperation with the EI national offices. The International Office shares office space with EICanada in Stouffville, Ontario, north of Toronto. The role of each national office is to manage and coordinate the work of EI in the project countries, recruit personnel and raise funds for EI-sponsored project country programs.

== Fundraising ==
One of EICanada's main functions as a national office is to raise funds for the purposes of financially implementing and sustaining the organization's various overseas projects.

In addition to traditional financial support for specific projects, EICanada accepts relevant gifts-in-kind in partnership with donor companies, foundations, churches and individuals. EICanada also has a number of other opportunities for donors to demonstrate their support for the organization's projects, including online donations.

EICanada has a fund-matching program through the Canadian Partnership Branch of the Canadian International Development Agency (CIDA). Every CIDA-approved EICanada project receives two-thirds of the funds needed from the Canadian government to finance the project.

EICanada is a registered charity with the Canada Revenue Agency – Charity # 11889 9277 RR0001.

== Anne of Green Gables ==
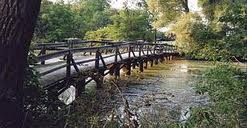
The "Anne of Green Gables Bridge" on the EICanada headquarters property in Stouffville, Ontario.

The EICanada headquarters property in Stouffville, Ontario was one of the filming locations for the 1985 television movie Anne of Green Gables, which was based on the classic novel of the same name by Canadian author Lucy Maud Montgomery. The bridge from several key scenes in the film, including Anne's reenactment of the Lady of Shalott and the end of the film when Anne and Gilbert kiss, is located on the southwest side of the EICanada property overlooking the pond.

The bridge at EICanada was also used as a filming location for the film's sequel in 1987, titled, Anne of Green Gables: The Sequel. EICanada hosted a tea party in the spring of 2008 to celebrate the 100th anniversary of the novel and the organization's role in the film. The bridge continues to be an interesting attraction for visitors to EICanada and Stouffville.
