= Seasons of Love (film) =

- DVD Cover
- Also known as: Love on the Land
- Based on: The Earth Abideth by George Dell
- Written by: Joe Wiesenfeld
- Directed by: Daniel Petrie
- Starring: Peter Strauss; Rachel Ward; Rip Torn
- Theme music composer: Peter Breiner
- Country of origin: Canada
- Original language: English

Production
- Executive producers: Trudy Grant; Peter Strauss
- Producer: Kevin Sullivan
- Cinematography: Ron Orieux
- Editor: Mairin Wilkinson
- Running time: 240 minutes
- Production company: Sullivan Entertainment

Original release
- Network: CBS
- Release: March 7 – March 9, 1999

Seasons of Love (also known as Love on the Land in Canada) is a four-hour Canadian television miniseries based on the novel The Earth Abideth by George Dell. The two part miniseries, produced for CBS by Sullivan Entertainment, was first broadcast in the US on March 7 and 9, 1999, under the title Seasons of Love. In Canada, it was broadcast on television and released on home video under the title Love on the Land. The film, directed by Daniel Petrie and starring Peter Strauss, Rachel Ward, Rip Torn and Hume Cronyn, was shot in Toronto and at Upper Canada Village near Morrisburg, Ontario.

== Synopsis ==
Love on the Land spans forty years in the lives of Thomas Linthorne and his wife Kate as they endure trials and tribulations while raising their family in rural Ohio after the Civil War. Thomas acquires a large piece of land and goes on a search for the woman of his dreams. He rescues Kate from an abusive relationship, and they develop a strong love for one another. Kate is unaware of the threat standing before her when a beautiful married woman moves in next door.

== Cast list ==
- Peter Strauss – Thomas Linthorne
- Rachel Ward – Kate Linthorne
- Hume Cronyn – Lonzo Brewster
- Rip Torn – Spence Vitt
- Nick Stahl – Grover Linthorne
- Justin Chambers – Hocking Linthorne
- Chandra West – Lucille Brewster
