= Mag Ruffman =

Canadian comedian, actress and television host

- Born: Margaret Ruffman; February 28, 1957 (age 69); Richmond Hill, Ontario, Canada
- Occupations: Actress; comedian; TV host
- Years active: 1982–present
- Spouse: Daniel Hunter (m. 1989)

Margaret "Mag" Ruffman (born February 28, 1957) is a Canadian comedian, actress and television host.

She has played roles in films such as Anne of Green Gables and Anne of Avonlea and TV series Road to Avonlea. She was reunited with Sarah Polley on the set of the Netflix show Alias Grace in 2017 when she played Diane.

Mag also creates and performs in the theatre. She created and performed as Ms. Eleanor Crumpacker in Dufferin Museum's 1919 Prohibition Halloween Dinner Theatre in 2019. Mag also wrote and performed in a one-woman show entitled Self-Help Cabaret on January 19, 2020.

In addition to her acting, Ruffman works on home improvement, hosting shows for W Network, Canada's women's network. She hosted A Repair to Remember in 1999 and 2000. In 2000, she launched a second series, Anything I Can Do, a workshop show. Ruffman writes a weekly home improvement column, ToolGirl, for the Toronto Star. She published a collection of her ToolGirl columns as a book, How Hard Can It Be?, in 2003.

== Filmography ==
=== Film ===
| Year | Title | Role | Notes |
|---|---|---|---|
| 1982 | Murder by Phone | Teenage Girl | |
| 1987 | Deep Sea Conspiracy | Nurse | |
| 1999 | My Grandmother Ironed the King's Shirts | Narrator (voice) | Short film |
| 2014 | Bully Fighters | Jury Woman 7 | Short film |
| 2019 | All About Who You Know | Linda | |

=== Television ===
| Year | Title | Role | Notes |
|---|---|---|---|
| 1985 | Perry Mason Returns | Salesgirl | TV film |
| 1985 | Anne of Green Gables | Alice Lawson | TV miniseries |
| 1986 | Reckless Disregard | Sandy | TV film |
| 1986 | Alex: The Life of a Child | Jane | TV film |
| 1986 | Perry Mason: The Case of the Shooting Star | | TV film |
| 1986 | Philip Marlowe, Private Eye | Maid (uncredited) | Episode: Trouble is My Business |
| 1987 | Smith & Smith | | TV series |
| 1987 | Amerika | Sally | TV miniseries |
| 1987 | Anne of Avonlea | Alice Lawson | TV miniseries |
| 1989 | Looking for Miracles | Nurse Blanche | TV film |
| 1990–96 | Road to Avonlea | Olivia King Dale | Main role |
| 1991 | Stranger in the Family | Mrs. Kessler | TV film |
| 1996 | Goosebumps | Mrs. Mathews | Episodes: "Attack of the Mutant: Parts 1 & 2" |
| 1998 | Happy Christmas, Miss King | Olivia Dale | TV film |
| 1999 | Shadow Lake | Louise Garby | TV film |
| 2000–01 | Timothy Goes to School | Lilly (voice) | Recurring role |
| 2011 | The Being Frank Show | | "1.11" |
| 2016 | Murdoch Mysteries | Eunice | Episode: "Unlucky in Love" |
| 2017 | Alias Grace | Diane | Episodes: "Part 1", "Part 5", "Part 6" |
| 2017 | Christmas Inheritance | Kathy Martin | TV film |
| 2020 | Avocado Toast | Meredith | Episodes: "Homo Milk", "Woke", "Burnt Toast" |

=== Writer & director ===
| Year | Title | Notes |
|---|---|---|
| 2008 | The Red Green Story: We're All in This Together | TV movie |
