= Sleeping Dogs Lie (1998 film) =

- DVD cover
- Based on: The Strange Case of Ambrose Small by Fred McClement
- Screenplay by: Raymond Storey
- Directed by: Stefan Scaini
- Starring: Wendy Crewson; Joel Keller; Michael Murphy
- Country of origin: Canada
- Original language: English

Production
- Producers: Trudy Grant; Kevin Sullivan
- Running time: 92 minutes (approx.)
- Production company: Sullivan Entertainment

Original release
- Release: 1998

Sleeping Dogs Lie is a 1998 film produced by Sullivan Entertainment and based on the true-life story of Ambrose Small, a Toronto millionaire who went missing after selling his chain of burlesque theatres for $1.7 million to Loew's movie theatres. The film is inspired by the book The Strange Case of Ambrose Small by Fred McClement. It stars Wendy Crewson as Mrs. Theresa Small.

The character of Ambrose Small also appears as a major character in the Michael Ondaatje novel, In the Skin of a Lion.

== Synopsis ==
It's 1919 and wealthy Toronto theatre magnate Ambrose Small (Art Hindle) has just sold his chain of theatres for over a million dollars. But he doesn't get a chance to enjoy it. Shortly after his wife Theresa (Wendy Crewson) deposits the cheque in the bank, Ambrose mysteriously disappears without a trace. Ambrose's disappearance sets off a powder keg of accusations directed at Theresa and young detective Cole Willis (Joel Keller) is brought in for her protection. Cole is immediately infatuated with the beautiful and alluring widow and finds himself caught up in the growing scandal involving sex, drugs and seedy politics. Cole must wade through the lies, deceit and corruption that surround Theresa Small in order to find out if she is capable of murder.

== Cast ==
- Wendy Crewson as Theresa Small
- Joel Keller as Detective Cole Willis
- Leon Pownall as Inspector Mitchell
- Shawn Doyle as Hammond
- Leslie Yeo as Daniel Small
- Shannon Lawson as Vivian Doughty
- Cedric Smith as J.J. Gallagher
- Art Hindle as Ambrose Small
- Eric Peterson as Jack Doughty
- Michael Murphy as Edgar Tratt
- Yoav Deckelbaum as Yosef Dolgoy
- Susannah Hoffmann as Shayna Francov
- Richard Blackburn as Thomas Flynn
- Michael Caruana as Walter
- Brad Garrick as Tink
- Rodger Barton as Marsh
- Nicky Guadagni as Sister Rosaria
- Marcia Bennett as Megan
- Richard McMillan as Rainville
- Alexandre Beaulieu as Marjorie
