= An Avonlea Christmas =

- poster
- Written by: Raymond Storey
- Directed by: Stefan Scaini
- Starring: Jackie Burroughs; Cedric Smith; Mag Ruffman; Lally Cadeau; Gema Zamprogna; Zachary Bennett
- Music by: Don Gillis
- Country of origin: Canada
- Original language: English

Production
- Producer: Trudy Grant
- Cinematography: Robert Saad
- Editor: Mairin Wilkinson
- Running time: 120 minutes
- Production company: Sullivan Entertainment

Original release
- Network: CBC Television
- Release: December 13, 1998

An Avonlea Christmas (also known as Happy Christmas, Miss King) is a 1998 Canadian made-for-television Christmas film directed by Stefan Scaini and written by Raymond Storey. A reunion special to the 1990–1996 television series Road to Avonlea, the story takes place against the backdrop of World War I as the King family prepares for Christmas Eve.

== Cast ==
- Jackie Burroughs as Hetty King
- Cedric Smith as Alec King
- Mag Ruffman as Olivia Dale
- Lally Cadeau as Janet King
- Patricia Hamilton as Rachel Lynde
- Gema Zamprogna as Felicity Pike
- Zachary Bennett as Felix King
- Kay Tremblay as Eliza Ward
- Molly Atkinson as Cecilly King
- Ryan Cooley as Daniel King
- Asa Perlman as Monty Dale
- Lauren Collins as Libby Hubble

== See also ==
- List of Christmas films
- Road to Avonlea
