= Butterbox Babies =

- DVD cover
- Directed by: Don McBrearty
- Written by: Raymond Storey
- Based on: Butterbox Babies by Bette L. Cahill
- Produced by: Trudy Grant; Kevin Sullivan
- Starring: Susan Clark; Peter MacNeill; Catherine Fitch
- Cinematography: Manfred Guthe
- Edited by: Mairin Wilkinson
- Production company: Sullivan Entertainment
- Release date: 1995
- Country: Canada
- Language: English

Butterbox Babies is a film adapted from the book Butterbox Babies by Bette L. Cahill, which is based on the true story of the Ideal Maternity Home, a home for unwed pregnant mothers, during the Great Depression and Second World War. The home made millions from the illegal adoption of illegitimate babies during the 1930s and 1940s.

== Synopsis ==
On the surface, Lila Young (Susan Clark) and her husband William (Peter MacNeill) are devout Christians pursuing their calling of helping young, unwed expectant mothers deliver their babies at the Ideal Maternity Home in Chester, Nova Scotia during the 1930s and 1940s. The medical community, however, is very skeptical about the safety of the procedures being conducted by Lila and the care being given to babies born at the Home. Skepticism soon becomes intense scrutiny when a routine delivery results in the death of a young mother and her baby. Desperate to continue their work and prove they are doing God's work, the Youngs start selling healthy babies to wealthy, childless couples. The babies that are born premature or unhealthy are poorly cared for and unceremoniously buried in wooden butter boxes if they die. The Youngs are out of business at the end of this shocking true story, but their years of illegally selling and burying babies makes it impossible to determine the extent of their atrocities to this day.

== Awards ==
- Two Gemini Awards – Best TV Movie, Best Supporting Actress In A Dramatic Program (Catherine Fitch)
- Nominee – Banff Television Festival, 1995 (Television movie category)
- Silver Award – Worldfest Houston Festival, 1995

== Cast ==
- Susan Clark as Lila Young
- Michael Riley as Russell Cameron
- Peter MacNeill as William Young
- Catherine Fitch as Iris
- Shannon Lawson as Ann O'Dwyer
- Nicholas Campbell as Clayton Oliver
- Ryan Thistlethwaite as Adopted Baby
