= Anne of Green Gables: The Continuing Story =

- Genre: Drama; Family
- Written by: Kevin Sullivan; Laurie Pearson
- Directed by: Stefan Scaini
- Starring: Megan Follows; Jonathan Crombie; Schuyler Grant; Greg Spottiswood; Cameron Daddo
- Music by: Peter Breiner
- Country of origin: Canada
- Original language: English
- No. of episodes: 2

Production
- Producer: Kevin Sullivan
- Cinematography: Robert Saad
- Editor: Mairin Wilkinson
- Running time: 185 minutes (approx.)
- Production company: Sullivan Entertainment
- Budget: $1.1 million

Original release
- Network: CBC Television
- Release: 5 March – 6 March 2000

Related
- An Avonlea Christmas (1998); Anne of Green Gables: A New Beginning (2008)

Anne of Green Gables: The Continuing Story is a 2000 miniseries television film, and the third installment in a series of four films. The film was highly anticipated among fans of Anne of Green Gables, and was the most controversial and heavily criticized of the three film adaptations written and produced by Kevin Sullivan.

The Continuing Story was criticized principally because, unlike the 1985 film Anne of Green Gables and its 1987 sequel, the screenplay is not based on Lucy Maud Montgomery's works, but is instead a completely original World War I story written by Sullivan and Laurie Pearson. Montgomery had in fact written a novel focused on Anne's youngest daughter set in that same period, Rilla of Ingleside, in which Anne is a middle-aged married woman whose three sons are at war in Europe.

The chronology of Sullivan's Anne of Green Gables films is not synchronized with Montgomery's novels, largely because of the spin-off series Road to Avonlea. Over the course of developing original characters and stories for seven seasons of Road to Avonlea, the timeframe of Sullivan's fictional world evolved into a 20-year difference from the novels. As a result, Sullivan decided to make the third film an entirely new story that took Anne and Gilbert, instead of their children, to the battlefields of World War I.

The film was also criticized for introducing a continuity problem. Following Colleen Dewhurst's death in 1991, Marilla Cuthbert's passing was written into Road to Avonlea. At the funeral, Hetty King refers to Gilbert and Anne Blythe, stating they are married. Anne does not appear in the episode because she is sick with scarlet fever which, according to Gilbert, she contracted from one of their children. However, in The Continuing Story, set long after Marilla's death, the two are still engaged and do not have children. The film attempts to resolve the discontinuity by having Gilbert say that they have been engaged so long that people think they got married years ago, and by revealing that Anne had scarlet fever while teaching at an orphanage in Nova Scotia.

Megan Follows reprised the role of Anne Shirley, Jonathan Crombie returned as Gilbert Blythe and several other cast members from the first two films also appear.

== Synopsis ==
Anne Shirley returns to Avonlea after five years of teaching at an orphanage in Nova Scotia while separated from her fiancé, Gilbert Blythe, who was finishing medical school. After catching up with Diana Barry and other old friends, Anne visits Green Gables. She is horrified to find that since Marilla's death (in the third season of Road to Avonlea), the new owners have treated Green Gables so poorly, that it is falling apart. Later, Anne is reunited with Gilbert on the island. However, instead of settling down immediately, Gilbert asks Anne to move to New York since he has been offered a staff position at Bellevue, a prestigious medical institution. Her reluctant agreement comes with the promise of being published and that they will return to Prince Edward Island to raise their family.

In New York, Anne is employed as a junior editor at a small publishing house, where she meets Jack Garrison, a writer and local sensation who becomes interested in Anne. Seeing her potential as a writer, he offers to become the editor for her new manuscript and use his influence to have it published under both their names. He threatens to jump from a window if Anne does not accept his help. When the manuscript is accepted, Anne is outraged to learn that Jack has presented it as entirely his own, and the publisher refuses to give her credit. She breaks off contact with Jack, who reveals he has fallen in love with her. Meanwhile, Gilbert is troubled by his work at Belleview hospital - most of the doctors are more interested in prestige than in saving lives. Disillusioned by life in New York, Anne and Gilbert return to Prince Edward Island.

Upon returning to Avonlea, Gilbert buys Green Gables from Mr. Harrison and they set about restoring the house as they plan their wedding. Anne accidentally starts a fire, slightly damaging the house. However, the couple find the effect of the war in Europe to be much more present; Fred Wright, Diana's husband, eventually enlists in the war as his family life becomes increasingly strained. Increasing pressure results in Gilbert enlisting as medical officer and he convinces Anne to marry him before he leaves. When he is declared missing in action, Anne leaves for Europe as a Red Cross volunteer in hopes of finding him.

Anne's desperate search in the war zone leads to a chance meeting with Jack Garrison, along with his girlfriend, Colette, and their infant son, Dominic. Jack, involved in dangerous espionage activities, leaves suddenly and asks that Anne take Colette and Dominic to London. However, Colette is killed in an explosion, while Anne briefly sees Gilbert as his troop is forced to abandon their field hospital. Anne promises Colette on her last breath to take care of Dominic and find his father. Left to care for Dominic, Anne finds an injured Fred and his arm must be amputated. They leave for London and reside in Jack's apartment until they can return to Canada; in that time, Anne works for a British newspaper office and becomes acquainted with Fergus Keegan, Jack's editor, and Maude Montrose, one of Jack's contemporaries and a fellow spy. When Jack arrives to make arrangements for his family, he learns of Colette's death and asks for Anne to care for Dominic should anything happen to him. Though Anne intends to return to Canada with Fred and Dominic, her connection to Jack as well as a resurfacing chance of finding Gilbert results in taking Dominic with her to France.

Disguised as a nun and befriending entertainers Margaret Bush and Elsie James, Anne struggles to bring Dominic to Kit Garrison, Jack's aunt who has also become involved in war efforts. Reunited again with Jack, Anne travels with him in hopes of finding her husband, Gilbert. As Anne's search continues to be fruitless, Jack attempts to persuade her to return with him to the United States and form a family with him and Dominic; Anne refuses, determined to continue searching for Gilbert in the war zone. When she encounters Margaret and Elsie again, she joins them in entertaining the soldiers; in the crowd, is Gilbert, and Anne is reunited with him at last. Jack arranges for them to leave immediately as the armistice to end the war approaches. However, Keegan's fear of being exposed as a traitor by Jack's group results in Jack being shot on the train; as he dies, he asks that Anne take care of his son. Once the armistice is declared, Anne and Gilbert attempt to find Dominic, but after finding Kit Garrison's château empty, they are forced to return to Canada in hopes of finding the child from home.

After a year of living back in Avonlea, Anne and Gilbert arrive at the local train station to collect Dominic, whom they are adopting as their own. With Gilbert prepared to take over another doctor's medical practice in the village of Glen St. Mary, they decide to leave Green Gables to Diana and Fred in order to start their new life together.

== Timeline of events (1915–1919) ==
- Summer 1915 – Anne, now 28 (born in 1888), returns to Avonlea from teaching at Hopetown Orphanage in Halifax.
- Fall 1915 – Anne and Gilbert move to New York. Anne begins working at Winfield Publishing where she meets author Jack Garrison. Gilbert is working at Bellevue Hospital.
- Spring 1917 – Anne and Gilbert return to Avonlea. Gilbert enlists in WWI.
- Summer 1917 – Anne and Gilbert are married.
- Early 1918 – All of Anne's letters to Gilbert have been returned to Avonlea.
- Spring 1918 – Anne goes to Europe in search of Gilbert. Anne runs into Jack Garrison on a train going through Europe and meets Collette and her baby, Dominic.
- September 1918 – Anne spots Gilbert leaving a field hospital in an ambulance, but before she can speak to him an explosion kills Collette, leaving Anne to care for Dominic.
- September 1918 – Anne finds Fred injured, but alive.
- October 1918 – Anne takes a job at a local paper in London.
- Fall 1919 – Anne and Gilbert adopt Dominic and move to Glen St. Mary, Four Winds, Prince Edward Island, leaving Green Gables to Diana and Fred.

== Cast ==
- Megan Follows - Anne Shirley Blythe
- Jonathan Crombie - Gilbert Blythe
- Schuyler Grant - Diana Barry Wright
- Patricia Hamilton - Rachel Lynde
- Greg Spottiswood - Fred Wright
- Cameron Daddo - Jack Garrison Jr.
- Sonia LaPlante - Colette
- Shannon Lawson - Elsie James
- Victoria Snow - Margaret Bush
- Janet-Laine Green - Maud Montrose
- Martha Henry - Kit Garrison
- Nigel Bennett - Fergus Keegan
- Douglas Campbell - Dr. Powell
- Colette Stevenson - Mrs. Findlay
- Zack Ward - Moody Spurgeon
- Miranda de Pencier - Josie Pye Spurgeon
- Lauren Peters/Nicole Peters - Dominic Garrison (later Dominic Blythe)

== Production ==
The third Anne film was a completely original concept that brought Anne and the other Avonlea characters (from both the Road to Avonlea television series and the previous two Anne of Green Gables films) into a time period when each character was faced with personal turmoil as a result of World War I. Sullivan's portrayal of Anne and Gilbert in this third film does not coincide chronologically with Montgomery's novels; Rilla of Ingleside portrays Anne's sons going off to fight in World War I while Anne and husband Gilbert witness the War from the home-front of Prince Edward Island. Rilla, their youngest daughter who is the main protagonist, raises someone else's little boy for a few years; he is referred to by the family as "Rilla's war-baby" and he was presumably the inspiration for Dominic in Anne of Green Gables: The Continuing Story.

While The Continuing Story was set in New York (USA), England, France and Germany, it filmed almost entirely in studio or on locations in Montreal and Southern Ontario, including Toronto.

== Sequel ==
In 2008, the centennial of the original novel's publication, Anne of Green Gables: A New Beginning was released, showing Anne as an older woman reminiscing on her childhood life before Green Gables. Barbara Hershey replaced Megan Follows as Anne, with Hannah Endicott-Douglas portraying young Anne. No major cast members returned, with the exception of Patricia Hamilton in a small cameo appearance as Rachel at the end.
