= P.R. (TV series) =

Canadian television sitcom

- DVD Cover
- Genre: Sitcom
- Created by: Kevin Sullivan
- Starring: Diane Flacks; Ellie Harvie; Fiona Reid
- Country of origin: Canada
- No. of seasons: 1
- No. of episodes: 13

Production
- Running time: 30 minutes

Original release
- Release: October 2, 2000 – 2001

P.R. is a Canadian television sitcom that aired on CBC Television in 2000. The show starred Diane Flacks as Alexandra Reed and Ellie Harvie as Jill Hayes, partners in a public relations firm.

Fiona Reid also starred as office manager Dierdre Duncan, a mysterious older British woman in the vein of The Avengers’ Emma Peel, who frequently hints at a shady past.

The show was widely characterized in the media as a Canadian adaptation of Absolutely Fabulous, although its humour was much less campy.

The show ended after 13 episodes.

== Synopsis ==
P.R. stars Diane Flacks, Ellie Harvie, and Fiona Reid, as high-profile public relations representatives in this behind-the-scenes look at the industry people love to hate. Alex Reed (Diane Flacks) is a fast-talker, liar, partier, and owner of Alexandra Reed & Associates, an up-and-coming metropolitan public relations firm. She and her partner (Ellie Harvie) create news and hype events to publicize an elite list of actors and celebrities. As their careers spin out of control, their personal lives do, as well, leading to many quirky misadventures.

== Cast ==
- Diane Flacks as Alexandra Reed
- Ellie Harvie as Jill Hayes
- Fiona Reid as Deirdre Duncan
- Mike Beaver as Benny
- Julia Paton as Marci Reed

== Episode list ==
1. "The Interview"
2. "Deirdre's Day"
3. "What About Me?"
4. "Designing Women"
5. "All About Eve"
6. "Child's Play"
7. "The Model Client"
8. "Black from the Dead"
9. "You've Got a Friend"
10. "Forgiveness and Other Phalasies"
11. "Cheap Skate"
12. "Smoke and Mirrors"
13. "It's Not Nice to Fool Mother Nature"

== DVD release ==
The whole series was released on DVD by the show's production company Sullivan Entertainment. It can be purchased on the production company's website.
