= The Piano Man's Daughter (film) =

- DVD cover
- Based on: The Piano Man's Daughter by Timothy Findley
- Written by: Kevin Sullivan
- Directed by: Kevin Sullivan
- Starring: Wendy Crewson; Christian Campbell; Stockard Channing
- Music by: Peter Breiner
- Country of origin: Canada
- Original language: English

Production
- Cinematography: Robert Saad
- Running time: 180 minutes
- Production companies: Canadian Broadcasting Corporation; Sullivan Entertainment

Original release
- Release: 22 September 2003

The Piano Man's Daughter is a 2003 television film, adapted from the 1995 novel of the same name by Timothy Findley. Rights to the novel's film adaptation were originally purchased by Whoopi Goldberg. Goldberg acquired the film rights after reading the novel while in Toronto starring in Norman Jewison’s film Bogus. Deciding that as a Canadian novel it would be most appropriate to work with a Canadian film studio, Goldberg produced the film in collaboration with Canadian producer Kevin Sullivan's Sullivan Entertainment.

== Plot ==
A young man must deal with several generations of madness and familial intrigue. Charlie Kilworth is a young man whose mother, Lily, is the daughter of Frederick Wyatt, the owner of a well-known piano manufacturing company. Lily is also a free-spirited and unstable woman, who bore Charlie out of wedlock, has had a number of lovers over the years, and has an unsettling fascination with fire. Lily's mother Ede has put her daughter in a mental hospital on several occasions, and is considering having Lily lobotomized. Charlie, meanwhile, has had affairs with a number of women but has never settled down with anyone; working as an events coordinator at a resort hotel, Charlie becomes infatuated with Alex Lamont, the singer in a dance band Charlie has booked into the ballroom. Lily urges her son to get married and raise a family, but Charlie isn't so sure he's ready for a lifetime commitment, and Alex becomes frustrated by Charlie's inability to take their relationship seriously. Meanwhile, Ede and Frederick have decided that Lily needs to be permanently committed to an institution; Charlie insists that they send her to a comfortable private facility, but then discovers that a mysterious benefactor has been supporting Lily for years, and Ede and Frederick have decided if Lily is to be in a private institution, then the generous stranger must be the one who pays for it.

== Cast ==
- Wendy Crewson as Ede Kilworth
- Christian Campbell as Charlie Kilworth
  - Jeffrey Peel and McKenzie Sullivan as Charlie (8 yrs.)
- Marnie McPhail as Young Lily Kilworth
- R.H. Thomson as Frederick Wyatt
- Sarah Strange as Alexandra Lamont
- Susan Coyne as Ada Harrison
- Chris Wiggins as James Kilworth
- Joel Keller as Neddy Harrison
- Deborah Pollitt as Eleanor Ormond
- Ian D. Clark as Coroner's Counsel
- David Hemblen as Dr. Warren
- Nuala Fitzgerald as Eliza Kilworth
- Dixie Seatle as Eleanor Hess
- Stockard Channing as Lily Kilworth
- Robert Fusco as the baby
