= The Story Girl =

1911 novel by L. M. Montgomery

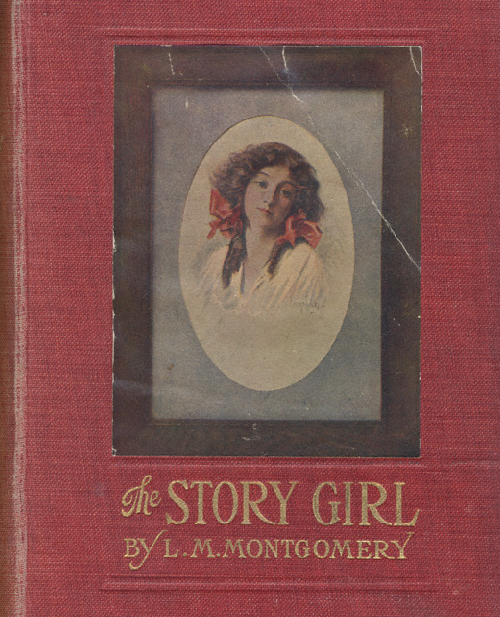
- First edition
- Author: Lucy Maud Montgomery
- Language: English
- Genre: Children's novel
- Publication date: 1911
- Publication place: Canada
- Media type: Print (Paperback, Hardcover)
- Followed by: The Golden Road
- Text: The Story Girl at Wikisource

The Story Girl is a 1911 novel by Canadian author L. M. Montgomery. It narrates the adventures of a group of young cousins and their friends who live in a rural community on Prince Edward Island, Canada.

In 1917, Montgomery opined that The Story Girl was her favorite of the novels she had written by that time.

== Overview ==
The book is narrated by Beverley, who together with his brother Felix, has come to live with his Aunt Janet and Uncle Alec King on their farm while their father travels for business. They spend their leisure time with their cousins Dan, Felicity and Cecily King, hired boy Peter Craig, neighbor Sara Ray and another cousin, Sara Stanley. The latter is the Story Girl of the title, and she entertains the group with fascinating tales including various events in the King family history. The book is actually two stories; those of Beverley King and his friends, and the tales told by the Story Girl.

Montgomery had grown up in a Scottish-Canadian family, where stories, legends, and myths from Scotland were often told, and she drew upon this background in creating the character of Stanley, who excels at the telling of tales. In the days before television and cinema, story-telling was one of the more favorite forms of popular entertainment. The Canadian scholar Elizabeth Waterson noted that the book begins with "...the Story Girl winning the ultimate accolade in the eyes of the Scottish community, when her facility at telling an old story squeezes a five dollar donation out of an old curmudgeon". Stanley in her first scene stands "gay and graceful" and promises she can tell some "witch stories" that "will freeze the blood in your veins". Unlike Montgomery's better known character Anne Shirley, whose wild, improbable stories are clearly those of a child while her later stories are those of a young adult, the Story Girl at the age of 14, is an accomplished story-teller whose achievements are beyond her age, which reflects her wisdom and maturity. The character of Peter Craig bears a strong resemblance in terms of appearance and personality to Herman Leard, the great love of Montgomery's life, the man she wished she had married, but did not. Most notably, Craig has blond curly hair, just like what Leard possessed while his personality is very similar to Leard's. The scholar Elizabeth Watson argued that the character of Peter Craig was meant to serve as a surrogate for the romantic history that Montgomery wished she had, but did not. Sara the story girl wins the love of Beverly, and bests her prettier rival Felicity for his affections not through her looks, but rather because of her sense of humor, her ability to see what others cannot, and a mystical sense of the beauty of the world. Montgomery wrote about the difference between the two: "Her face was like a rose of youth. But when the Story Girl spoke, we forgot to look at Felicity". The Story girl has a somewhat dreamy quality not only to her stories, but herself as she says "I'd like a dress of moonshine with stars for buttons". The Story Girl triumphs because of her inner qualities with her integrity, her strong sense of romanticism and her powers of imagination proving to be more greater than anything possessed by the pretty, but inane Felicity.

At the time she was writing the novel in 1909–10, Montgomery was engaged to a Presbyterian minister whom she did not love, the Reverend Ewen Macdonald, whom she was to marry in 1911, and in the book, Montgomery has the characters give mock sermons that ridiculed the speaking styles of Presbyterian ministers. The way that the speaking style Macdonald employed was mocked in the novel reflected some doubts that Montgomery had about an impending marriage. Montgomery knew when she wed Macdonald that she would leave Prince Edward Island for Ontario, and at the time she started writing the book in the summer of 1909 was overcome with nostalgia for her teenage years. Montgomery drew upon her diaries of her life to teenage as inspiration for the novel.

The depressed character Sara Ray reflected another aspect of Montgomery's personality as she often suffered from melancholia. Just as Sara the Story Girl shines, so does the "other Sara" stand in her shadow, a sad girl unable to find happiness. Likewise, the characters of overweight Felix who is full of self-doubt is contrasted to his cousin, the beautiful and proud Felicity. The conflict between Felicity, who only wants to find a good man to marry when she grows up and who expresses envy over the Story Girl who wants to tell stories that make everyone happy, reflected the tension that Montgomery herself felt between her desire to be a writer vs. the popular expectation that she would marry and abandon her writing career. At the time, it was widely expected that Montgomery cease to be writer when she wed Macdonald. Like Montgomery, the Story Girl longs for an absent father whom she never sees. At the time she was writing the book, several of Montgomery's relatives had recently died, causing her to have an obsession with death. Moreover, Montgomery's parents and Leard were all dead by this time, leaving her with wounds that never healed. However, in the book, death is often spoken of, but mocked with the threat of death being reduced down to a sick cat and case of measles, through Stanley's story about the arrogant princess who refused love and married death hints at the darker side of Montgomery's personality. At one point, the characters find a portrait of God that terrifies them that depicts the Lord of All the Hosts as "the stern, angrily-frowning old man with the tossing hair and beard" that appears to be inspired by William Blake painting Urizen. Through the teenagers are frightened, it is all presented very humorously as mere trifling. Despite the light tone, the Story Girl's tales about angels whose love was forbidden changed the constellations and that of the proud man who blasphemed God's name and was punished by torn apart by Satan's claw forever in Hell shows the more serious side of Montgomery's faith.

A recurring theme is that the central story of the relationships between the teenagers listening to the Story Girl are presented in a light-hearted manner while the stories told by the Story Girl are often more serious. Montgomery has the Story Girl tell 32 different stories over the course of the book that variously are comic stories mocking pompous Presbyterian ministers, "Oriental" romances, Scottish folk tales, retellings of Greek myths and poems by Tennyson, and "weird" ghost stories inspired by Edgar Allan Poe. The novel ends in the fall of "royal magnificence of coloring, under the vivid blue autumn sky" where at "the big willow by the gate was a splendid golden dome, and the maples that were scattered through the spruce grove waved blood-red banners over the sombre cone-bearers" where the Story Girl stands with a garland made of leaves.

The sequel to the book is The Golden Road, written in 1913.

The Story Girl was one of the books which inspired the Canadian television series Road to Avonlea.

== The Wedding Veil of the Proud Princess ==
In 2024, the story Sara Stanley narrates in the fourth chapter was adapted into The Wedding Veil of the Proud Princess, a fantasy animated short film directed by Anna-Ester Volozh and narrated by Pik-Sen Lim in her final film role.

== Bibliography ==
- Lucy Maud Montgomery, The Story Girl, Grandfather Clock series, flower-ed 2019, ISBN 9788885628533
