= The Golden Road (Montgomery novel) =

1913 novel by L. M. Montgomery

- First edition
- Author: Lucy Maud Montgomery
- Language: English
- Genre: Children's novel
- Publisher: L.C. Page & Co.
- Publication date: 1913
- Publication place: Canada
- Media type: Print (paperback, hardcover)
- Preceded by: The Story Girl
- Text: The Golden Road at Wikisource

The Golden Road is a 1913 novel by Canadian author L. M. Montgomery.

== Background ==
As a child, Montgomery learned many stories from her great-aunt Mary Lawson. She later used these in The Story Girl and The Golden Road. Montgomery married on July 5, 1911, and left Prince Edward Island. She arrived at Leaskdale, Ontario in October, where her husband served as the minister of St. Paul's Presbyterian Church. She began work on this novel on April 30, 1912, and gave birth to her first son on July 7. She finished the novel on May 21, 1913, saying "I have been too hurried and stinted for time. I have had to write it at high pressure, all the time nervously expecting some interruption". The book was published on September 1. It was dedicated to Mary Lawson.

== Plot summary ==
The plot is based around the character Beverley who remembers his childhood days with his brother Felix and friends and cousins Felicity, Cecily, Dan, Sara Stanley (the "Story Girl" of the title), hired-boy Peter Craig and neighbour Sara Ray. The children often played in their family's orchard and had many adventures, even creating their own newspaper, called Our Magazine. More character development takes place in this novel than in its predecessor and the reader is able to watch the children grow up; in particular, they are able to watch Sara Stanley leave the Golden Road of childhood forever. They also are able to see the beginnings of a relationship between Peter and Felicity, as chemistry between them starts to build; it also seems that Beverley and Sara Stanley are drawn to each other but this is left undeveloped. Throughout the story it is hinted that Beverley's cousin, Cecily, is consumptive; in a passage where the Story Girl tells their futures, the adult Beverley confirms that Cecily never left the Golden Road. As well, Beverley strongly hints that Peter and Felicity will be married. The novel ends after Sara's father collects her to give her a proper education and their small group is never complete again.
