= Kevin Sullivan (producer) =

Canadian film director and producer

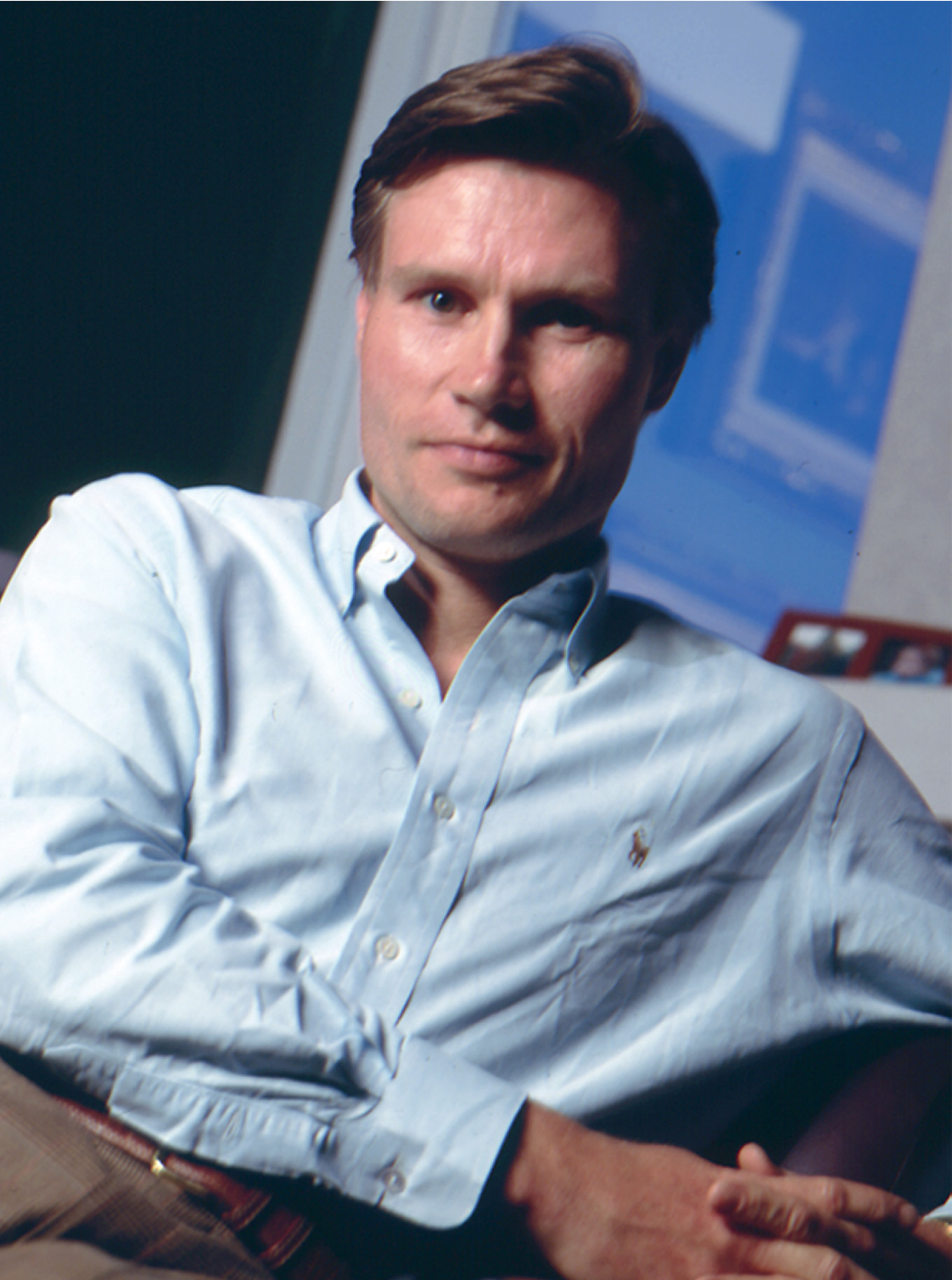
- Born: Kevin Roderick Sullivan c. 1955 (age 70–71); Toronto, Ontario, Canada
- Education: University of Toronto (1979, B.S.)
- Occupation: President of Sullivan Entertainment Inc
- Years active: 1979–present
- Spouse: Trudy Grant

Kevin Roderick Sullivan (born c. 1955) is a Canadian writer, director and producer of film and television programs. He is best known for detailed period movies such as the Anne of Green Gables series of films, his movie adaptation of Timothy Findley's novel The Piano Man's Daughter, feature films and TV-movies such as Under the Piano, Butterbox Babies, Sleeping Dogs Lie and the CBS mini-series Seasons of Love, as well as long-running television series such as Road to Avonlea and Wind at My Back.

== Early life ==
Sullivan began his film-making career at the early age of 24. His father, Glenn A. Sullivan, was a successful attorney and his uncle, Senator Joseph A. Sullivan, was a prominent doctor with a seat in the Canadian senate from 1957 to 1985. Kevin Sullivan did not follow in either of their footsteps. His first foray into film-making was with a half-hour Hans Christian Andersen Christmas special, titled The Fir Tree (1979), of which he edited and also had a small acting role. From there Sullivan wrote, produced and directed Krieghoff (1979), a widely acclaimed docu-drama in French and English on the life of Cornelius Krieghoff, the prominent German artist and illustrator of 19th-century Quebec.

Sullivan graduated from the University of Toronto in 1979 with a Bachelor of Science in biology. That year, he founded Sullivan Films (later Sullivan Entertainment) with Trudy Grant (to whom he is now married) and they created a successful international production and distribution company that has been operating for over thirty years.

== Career ==
In 1980 Sullivan wrote, produced, and directed Megan Carey (1980), a film about a young Irish immigrant indentured on a farm in 19th century Canada. His first feature film was The Wild Pony (1982), which he co-wrote, co-produced and directed, it became a turning point for Sullivan, having been the first feature-length movie to be made exclusively for pay-TV in Canada.

In 1984 he purchased the rights to Anne of Green Gables, completing the screenplay for the four-hour miniseries in 1985 with co-writer Joe Wiesenfeld. Anne of Green Gables and its sequel were the highest rated dramatic productions to air in Canadian TV history. Cinematic feature versions played in theaters in Japan for five years straight.

The success of Anne of Green Gables, starring Megan Follows, Richard Farnsworth and Colleen Dewhurst led to three sequels: Anne of Green Gables – The Sequel (1987 aka Anne of Avonlea – US release) starring Follows, Dewhurst and Wendy Hiller, Anne of Green Gables: The Continuing Story (1998) and most recently Anne of Green Gables: A New Beginning (2009), starring Barbara Hershey and Shirley MacLaine. Sullivan penned all three sequel screenplays as well as the novel for Anne of Green Gables: A New Beginning. An educational, animated series Anne of Green Gables: The Animated Series produced for PBS Kids and Road to Avonlea produced for CBC and Disney, were each successful spin offs from the Anne of Green Gables franchise.

Set in early 1900s Prince Edward Island, Road to Avonlea was the most popular and most lucrative drama series in Canadian TV history. Co-produced with a strong influence by Disney, Road to Avonlea was filmed on a 300-acre farm and in Sullivan's studio and back-lot in Toronto. In recent years, Road to Avonlea fans from around the world have organized Avonlea Conventions (Avcon) in Toronto to meet with stars of the show, tour filming locations and celebrate their love of the show.

With Wind at My Back, the 67 episode depression-era series produced as a follow-up to Road to Avonlea, Sullivan created an entire 1930s town on his company's 1.5 acre studio backlot, one of the largest in Canada, located at Sullivan Entertainment's 60,000 square foot studio and sound-stages in Toronto, which the company continues to operate. He has accumulated thousands of items of period costumes, sets and props ranging from the 1860s to the 1960s.

Inspired by a lifelong interest in Baroque Architecture and the beauty of Mozart's hometown of Salzburg, in 2006 (the "Mozart-Jahre") Sullivan decided to create a contemporary, English-language feature film of the composer's classic opera The Magic Flute, entitled Magic Flute Diaries. The film was a full-scale CGI production created like a variation of Sin City and 300 with elaborate studio green-screen production design. Special choreography sequences and backdrops were shot on location in palaces, monasteries and gardens in Austria and Germany.

Sullivan produced a companion documentary to Magic Flute Diaries titled Mozart Decoded, which takes a historical look at Mozart's involvement with the Freemasons and his genius as a composer. Sullivan productions have reportedly been viewed in more than 140 countries.

Sullivan Entertainment's 1999 efforts to transition to a publicly traded company triggered a dispute with Lucy Maud Montgomery's heirs. Its prospectus informed potential investors that its shows based on Montgomery's work had been profitable, generating $35.7 million CAD in 1997 alone. However Montgomery's heirs had been told two shows based on works Sullivan believed it had acquired dramatic rights to, had failed to turn a profit, so they sued. Sullivan counter-sued, for damage to his reputation, successfully providing evidence that the heirs of Montgomery had no reversionary copyright claims to the dramatic rights to the original novel they had sold him. The matter was eventually settled between the parties. Sullivan is a licensee of the Anne of Green Gables trademarks.

Sullivan is currently writing and producing an adaptation of Timothy Findley's Famous Last Words about the plot to kidnap the Duke and Duchess of Windsor in Lisbon in 1936, known as Operation Willi. He is also developing a film adaptation of "The Ballad of Blind Tom", based on the book by Deirdre O'Connell about the life of musical prodigy Blind Tom Wiggins.

== Books ==
As a writer and art-enthusiast, Sullivan is the author of Beyond Green Gables, a behind-the-scenes look at the production design and inspiration for his films. Sullivan's Publishing Division, Davenport Press, has released over 50 books. These titles are available as hard books and ebooks. They include novels Anne of Green Gables ~ A New Beginning, a children's book series based on Anne of Green Gables: The Animated Series, and an assortment of specialty coffee table books.

== Other endeavors ==
Sullivan Entertainment owns and operates a four-acre studio/backlot facility in Toronto which holds and rents an assortment of props, set pieces and costumes that were used in Sullivan productions.

In 2016, Sullivan Entertainment announced it would launch their own streaming service called Gazebo TV that would feature the Road to Avonlea series among other titles produced by the company. The service launched in early 2017.

Sullivan is also an art collector. This interest compelled him to produce the documentary Out of the Shadows. Narrated by Donald Sutherland, the documentary shows how new types of x-rays and digital imaging are allowing scientists to see beneath layers of paint to reveal and authenticate paintings by masters such as Rembrandt, Goya, Caravaggio and Van Gogh. Out of the Shadows closely follows the scientific journey of a group of material physicists and art historians during the attribution of Rembrandt's painting Old Man with a Beard at the Brookhaven National Synchrotron in Long Island, New York. The film premiered at The Metropolitan Museum in New York in June 2012.

== Awards and recognition ==
Having produced over 500 hours of movies and television in his thirty-year career he has also won hundreds of international awards, including three Emmy Awards, a Peabody Award for outstanding contribution to television, Gemini, Cable-Ace & Prix Jeunesse Awards.

=== List of awards ===
- George Foster Peabody Award
- 3 Emmy Awards
- 6 Emmy Award Nominations
- 5 Gemini Awards
- 8 Gemini Award Nominations
- 3 CableACE Awards
- 2 CableACE Nominations
- Prix Jeunesse
- TV Guide Parent's Choice Award
- American TV Critics Award
- 3 Golden Apple Awards from the National Educational Media Competition
- 1 Ollie Award
- European Jury Prize at the Umbriafiction TV Festival
- Gold World Medal – New York Film Festival
- Golden Gate Award
- Gold Medal – New York International Film and Television Festival
- ACT Award
- Best Children's Production – Television Movie Awards

== Selected filmography ==
=== Director ===
- Out of the Shadows (film, 2010)
- Anne of Green Gables: A New Beginning (film, 2008)
- Mozart Decoded (film, 2008)
- Magic Flute Diaries (film, 2008)
- Anne, Journey to Green Gables (animated film, 2005)
- The Piano Man's Daughter (film, 2003)
- Lantern Hill (film, 1990)
- Looking for Miracles (film, 1989)
- Anne of Avonlea (film 1987)
- Anne of Green Gables (film, 1985)
- The Wild Pony (film, 1982)
- Krieghoff (film, 1981)
- The Fir Tree (film 1980)

=== Executive producer ===
- Anne of Green Gables: A New Beginning (film, 2008)
- Mozart Decoded (film, 2008)
- Magic Flute Diaries (film, 2008)
- Anne, Journey to Green Gables (animated film, 2005)
- The Piano Man's Daughter (film, 2003)
- Wind at My Back Christmas (film, 2001)
- P.R. (film, 2001)
- P.R. (Television Series, 2001)
- Super Rupert (Television Series, 2001)
- Anne of Green Gables: The Animated Series (Television Series, 2000)
- Anne of Green Gables: The Continuing Story (film, 2000)
- Seasons of Love (film, 1999)
- Sleeping Dogs Lie (film, 1998)
- Happy Christmas Miss King (film, 1998)
- Promise the Moon (film, 1997)
- Wind at My Back (Television Series, 1996–2000)
- Under the Piano (film, 1995)
- Butterbox Babies (film, 1995)
- By Way of the Stars (film, 1992)
- Lantern Hill (film, 1990)
- Looking for Miracles (film, 1990)
- Road to Avonlea (Television Series, 1989–1996)
- Anne of Avonlea (film, 1987)
- Anne of Green Gables (film, 1985)
- The Wild Pony (film, 1982)

=== Screenwriter ===
- Out of the Shadows (film, 2010)
- Anne of Green Gables: A New Beginning (film, 2008)
- Mozart Decoded (film, 2008)
- Magic Flute Diaries (film, 2008)
- Anne, Journey to Green Gables (film, 2005)
- The Piano Man's Daughter (film, 2003)
- Anne of Green Gables: The Continuing Story (film, 2000)
- Promise the Moon (film, 1997)
- Wind at My Back (Television series 1996–2000)
- Road to Avonlea (Television series 1989 -1996)
- Lantern Hill (film, 1990)
- Looking for Miracles (film, 1989)
- Anne of Green Gables: The Sequel (film, 1987)
- Anne of Green Gables (film, 1985)
- The Wild Pony (film, 1982)

== Kevin Sullivan's Anne Series ==
1. Anne of Green Gables – 1985
2. Anne of Green Gables: The Sequel – 1987
3. Anne of Green Gables: The Continuing Story – 2000
4. Anne of Green Gables: A New Beginning – 2008
