= Road to Avonlea =

Canadian television series

- Genre: Historical drama
- Created by: Kevin Sullivan
- Based on: The Story Girl; The Golden Road; Chronicles of Avonlea; Further Chronicles of Avonlea by Lucy Maud Montgomery
- Starring: Sarah Polley; Jackie Burroughs; Lally Cadeau; Cedric Smith; Gema Zamprogna; Zachary Bennett; Michael Mahonen; Mag Ruffman
- Composers: John Welsman, Hagood Hardy
- Country of origin: Canada
- Original language: English
- No. of seasons: 7
- No. of episodes: 91 (list of episodes)

Production
- Running time: 45 minutes
- Production company: Sullivan Films

Original release
- Network: CBC
- Release: January 7, 1990 – March 31, 1996

Road to Avonlea is a Canadian television series first broadcast in Canada between January 7, 1990, and March 31, 1996, as part of the CBC Family Hour anthology series, and in the United States starting on March 5, 1990. It was created by Kevin Sullivan and produced by Sullivan Films (later Sullivan Entertainment) in association with the CBC and the Disney Channel, with additional funding from Telefilm Canada. It follows the adventures of Sara Stanley, a young girl sent to live with her relatives in early 20th-century eastern Canada. It was loosely adapted from novels by Lucy Maud Montgomery, with many characters and episodes inspired by her stories.

Some episodes were turned into independent books by various authors; around 30 titles have been released.

In the United States, its title was shortened to Avonlea, and a number of episodes were re-titled and re-ordered. The series was released on VHS and DVD there as Tales from Avonlea.

== Background and development ==
The series was initially loosely inspired from a cross section of several books by Lucy Maud Montgomery, primarily The Story Girl and The Golden Road, both of which feature Sara Stanley and the King family. Set in Prince Edward Island, the books' stories take place in the village of Blair Water, not Avonlea. Many early episodes' plots are based on stories from Montgomery's Chronicles of Avonlea and Further Chronicles of Avonlea. The characters of Beverly and Felix (cousins of the King family) and Dan King were changed. Beverly is not in the television series and Felix and Daniel are incorporated as brothers of Felicity and Cecily, with Felix as second oldest after Felicity, and Daniel being the youngest King child.

A number of supporting characters were sourced from Montgomery's Anne of Green Gables series. The show is set within the same continuity as Sullivan's 1985 film and its 1987 sequel adapted from the Anne novels. Rachel Lynde, Marilla Cuthbert, and Muriel Stacey all originally appeared in Montgomery's debut novel Anne of Green Gables, with Rachel and Marilla being briefly mentioned in passing in Chronicles of Avonlea. Patricia Hamilton, Colleen Dewhurst, and Marilyn Lightstone, who had played the characters in the films, returned for the Road to Avonlea series. The characters of Davy and Dora Keith were originally from Anne of Avonlea, the first sequel to the Anne Of Green Gables book series. The character of Anne Shirley herself never appears, although she was referred to on rare occasions. Anne's husband, Gilbert Blythe does appear in one episode, in season three, after Marilla dies. Jonathan Crombie reprised his role from the films.

In the United States, the title was shortened to simply Avonlea, and a number of episodes were re-titled and re-ordered. When the series was released on VHS and DVD in the United States, the title changed from Road to Avonlea to Tales from Avonlea.

The series is set in the fictional small town of Avonlea, Prince Edward Island, in the early 20th century (1903–1912). Ten-year-old Montreal heiress Sara Stanley (Sarah Polley) is sent by her wealthy father to live with her two maiden aunts, Hetty and Olivia King, to be near her late mother's side of the family after an embezzlement scandal results in him being placed under house arrest. The show's focus shifted over the years from Sara's interactions with locals to stories about the King family. Later seasons of the show focused more on residents of Avonlea who were connected to the King family. Sarah Polley left the show in 1994, returning for a guest appearance in the sixth season as well as the series' finale episode.

Following the series proper, a reunion TV movie called An Avonlea Christmas was produced in 1998.

== Characters ==
Major characters in the series (from left to right): Hetty King, Jasper Dale, Olivia King Dale, Sara Stanley, Alec King, Felix King, Janet King, (front row) Cecily King, Eliza Ward and Felicity King

=== King family ===
- Sara Stanley (Sarah Polley): An adventurous 10 year old girl used to fine living in Montreal who must learn to adjust to a simpler life in Avonlea when her father runs into legal trouble. She moves into Rose Cottage with Hetty and Olivia King, the sisters of her late mother, Ruth.
- Henrietta "Hetty" King (Jackie Burroughs): The oldest King sibling who lives at Rose Cottage with her sister, Olivia. She is a strict disciplinarian and the Avonlea schoolteacher. Burroughs had previously portrayed Amelia Evans in Anne of Green Gables.
- Olivia King (Mag Ruffman): The youngest King sibling. Affectionate and sensitive, most of her experiences throughout the series involve her social dealings with other Avonlea residents. Ruffman had previously portrayed Alice Lawson in Anne of Green Gables and Anne of Green Gables: The Sequel.
- Alec King (Cedric Smith): Sara's uncle and the brother of Hetty, Olivia, Roger, and Ruth. He lives with his family at King Farm next door to Rose Cottage. Smith had previously portrayed Reverend Allan in Anne of Green Gables.
- Janet King (Lally Cadeau): Alec's independent-minded wife and the mother of Felicity, Felix, Cecily, and Daniel King. She has a sister, Abigail MacEwan (Rosemary Dunsmore); Dunsmore previously portrayed Katherine Brooke in Anne of Green Gables: The Sequel.
- Felicity King (Gema Zamprogna): Alec and Janet's eldest child. She insists on having adult responsibilities and feels superior to her younger siblings and her cousins.
- Felix King (Zachary Bennett): Alec and Janet's mischievous and troublesome older son.
- Cecily King (Harmony Cramp season 1–5, Molly Atkinson seasons 6 & 7): Alec and Janet's quiet and gentle younger daughter. She is more interested in farm work than her siblings and is content with her life in Avonlea.
- Daniel King (Alex and Ryan Floyd): Alec and Janet's youngest child who is born at the end of season two.
- Andrew King (Joel Blake): Roger King's son who is sent to live on King Farm at the same time as Sara. In season two, his father returns and takes Andrew back to Halifax.

=== Avonlea residents ===
- Gus Pike (Michael Mahonen): A young vagabond and sailor known for using Maritimer English. He and Felicity develop a romance over the years.
- Jasper Dale (R. H. Thomson): An inventor and photographer with a stutter who eventually marries Olivia. Thomson later played Matthew Cuthbert in Anne with an E.
- Eliza Ward (Kay Tremblay): Janet and Abigail's eccentric and overbearing great aunt who often visits King Farm. She later moves in with them and her wit and wisdom become indispensable to the King family.
- Rachel Lynde (Patricia Hamilton): The local busybody and self-appointed moral guardian of Avonlea. Her character originally appeared in Anne of Green Gables. She initially lives with Marilla Cuthbert at the Green Gables farm, and later moves into Rose Cottage with Hetty.
- Marilla Cuthbert (Colleen Dewhurst): Rachel's more tolerant best friend who has never married and lived with her late brother Matthew for many years. She originally appeared in Anne of Green Gables. She later adopts Davey and Dora Keith, the orphaned twins of her distant relative. After Dewhurst's death in 1991, Marilla's death was written into the season 3 finale, leaving Rachel to care for the children.
- Davey Keith (Kyle Labine): Marilla's orphaned relative who comes to live at Green Gables with his twin sister, Dora. Davey is wild and rambunctious, often getting into trouble. In Anne of Green Gables: The Continuing Story, Rachel Lynde tells Anne Shirley that Davey has enlisted in World War I.
- Dora Keith (Ashley Muscroft seasons 2 & 3, Lindsay Murrell seasons 4-7): Davey's sweet and well behaved twin sister who moves with him to Green Gables after the death of their mother.
- Muriel Stacey (Marilyn Lightstone): A schoolteacher recently promoted to superintendent and Hetty's rival. Her character originally appeared in Anne of Green Gables. She later takes over Lawson's general store and marries Clive Pettibone. Though she does not appear in An Avonlea Christmas, her voice narrates the beginning.
- Clive Pettibone (David Fox): A former army colonel who takes over the Avonlea school from Hetty. From his first marriage, he has three children: Arthur (Zachary Ansley), Morgan, and Izzy. He is later promoted to superintendent and marries Muriel Stacey. Fox had previously portrayed John Blythe in Anne of Green Gables: The Sequel and later made a cameo appearance as an infirm man in Anne with an E.
- Isolde "Izzy" Pettibone (Heather Brown): Clive's youngest child and only daughter. A tomboy, she quickly befriends Felix King and eventually becomes his romantic interest.
- Elvira Lawson (Alva Mai Hoover): The wife of the Lawson's general store owner and a local Avonlea gossip.
- Clara Potts (Maja Ardal): A town gossip who is disliked by many in Avonlea. She is married to Bert Potts and has a daughter named Sally.
- Bert Potts (Roger Dunn): The husband of Clara and the father of Sally Potts.
- Sally Potts (Tara Meyer): The daughter of Clara and Bert Potts.
- Eulalie Bugle (Barbara Hamilton): Another town gossip most often seen with Clara Potts or Rachel Lynde. Barbara Hamilton is the sister of Patricia Hamilton and had played Marilla Cuthbert in the 1972 British miniseries Anne of Green Gables and its sequel Anne of Avonlea.
- Simon Tremayne (Ian D. Clark): Hetty King's business partner and the owner of the White Sands hotel. He is the disinherited first born son of the Duke of Arranagh. Clark later played the Bright River station master in Anne with an E.
- Archie Gillis (John Friesen): The owner of the local sawmill, an arrogant bully, and the self-appointed coach of the Avonlea Avengers hockey team.

== Guest stars ==
Many famous actors have made guest appearances on the show, including

- Frances Bay
- Ned Beatty
- Robby Benson
- Laura Bertram
- Zoe Caldwell
- Stockard Channing
- Peter Coyote
- Shirley Douglas
- Faye Dunaway
- Ryan Gosling
- Bruce Greenwood
- Madeline Kahn
- Tyler Labine
- Eugene Levy
- Christopher Lloyd
- Sheila McCarthy
- W. O. Mitchell
- Kate Nelligan
- John Neville
- Christopher Reeve
- Diana Rigg
- Wayne Robson
- Maureen Stapleton
- Malcolm Stoddard
- Meg Tilly
- Dianne Wiest
- Treat Williams
- Jaimz Woolvett
- Marc Worden
- Michael York

== Locations ==
The Road to Avonlea set was constructed in Uxbridge, Ontario—the town where Lucy Maud Montgomery lived and wrote for a decade after moving from Prince Edward Island. The town of Avonlea was adapted from existing buildings. Its roads were painted red in an attempt to match the distinctive color of the island's iron-rich soil. Filming also took place regularly at Westfield Heritage Centre in Flamborough, Ontario. Photography and enhanced digital matter work married second-unit scenes of Prince Edward Island with the Leaskdale location where necessary.

== Home media ==
Sullivan Entertainment released all seven seasons on DVD in Region 1 for the first time between 2005 and 2006. In 2009, they began re-releasing the series in wide screen format. As of December 2012, all seven seasons and the Christmas special had been released in widescreen format.

In 2016, Sullivan Entertainment announced it would launch their own streaming service called Gazebo TV that would feature the Road to Avonlea series among other titles produced by the company. The service launched in early 2017. As of 2026, it is on the Canadian version of Crave.

== Ratings ==
The series debut garnered 2.527 million (2+) viewers.

== Awards and nominations ==
During Road to Avonlea's seven-year run, it won and was nominated for numerous awards worldwide:

- 16 Emmy nominations, four Emmy Award wins: Outstanding Lead Actor in a Dramatic Series (Christopher Lloyd) - "Another Point of View", 1992; Outstanding Children's Program - "Incident At Vernon River", 1993; Outstanding Costume Design for a Series - "Strictly Melodrama", 1995; Outstanding Guest Actress in a Dramatic Series (Dianne Wiest) - "Woman of Importance", 1997.
- 17 CableAce nominations, four CableAce Awards: Best Dramatic Series, 1991; Best Dramatic Series, 1993; Best Dramatic Series, 1994; Best Writing in a Dramatic Series (Heather Conkie)
- 18 Gemini Awards: Best Direction, Best Costume Design, Best Original Score (John Welsman), Best Performance by a Lead Actress (Jackie Burroughs), 1990; Best Original Score, Best Performance by a Lead Actress (Jackie Burroughs), 1991; Best Leading Actor (Cedric Smith), Best Guest Performance in a Series (Kate Nelligan), Best Direction in a Series (Allan King), 1992; Best Actress (Jackie Burroughs), 1993; Best Guest Performance in a Series (Bruce Greenwood), Best Original Score, Best Actress (Lally Cadeau), 1994; Best Supporting Actress (Patricia Hamilton), Best Original Score, 1995; Best Supporting Actress (Kay Tremblay), Best Guest Actress (Frances Bay), Best Original Score, 1996.
- Six Gemini nominations
- Three John Labatt Classic Awards for Most Popular Program in Canada (chosen by the public), 1990, 1991, and 1992

== International broadcasters of Road to Avonlea ==
=== North America ===
- United States: Disney Channel
- Mexico: ZAZ

=== Central America ===
- Panama: FETV Canal 5

=== South America ===
- Argentina: Canal 9 Libertad (1992–1997) (2000–2002 known Azul TV) / Channel 20 (2005–2010) / Magazine TV Pay (Cable, Satellite and IPTV) (2004–present)
- Paraguay: Canal 13 RPC (1992–1997) (2000–2002) / Paravisión (2005–2010) / Channel 8 of CVC and 31 of TVD (2004–present)
- Uruguay: Canal 10 (1992–1997) / TCC (2004–present)

=== Europe ===
- Germany: Bibel tv
- Poland: TVP1, TV Puls
- Serbia: RTS, RTV BK Telecom, B92, RTS1
- Hungary: M1, Duna TV, Story4, Prime, IzauraTV, TV2 Kids
- Turkey: Artı Bir TV
- Cyprus: CyBC
- Greece: Hellenic Broadcasting Corporation, ART TV
- United Kingdom: ITV3
- France, Monaco, Switzerland, Luxembourg: M6, TMC, Série Club, RTL9
- Netherlands: Evangelische Omroep, SBS6, Family 7
- Belgium: VTM, Vitaya (2013)
- Italy: Rai 1 (2001)
- Finland: Yle TV1
- Croatia: HRT
- Romania: TVR1, TVR2
- Portugal: RTP1

=== Asia ===
- Japan: NHK (1993–1994, 1996–1997), LaLa TV (2011)
- India: Hallmark Channel (late-1990s–early-2000s)
- Iran: IRIB TV2 & Namayesh TV & Omid TV & Tamasha TV
- Vietnam: VTV3
- Saudi Arabia: Saudi 2 (1994)

== See also ==
- An Avonlea Christmas
