= 5th Gemini Awards =

1990 awards for Canadian television

- Date: December 4, 1990
- Venue: Metro Toronto Convention Centre

Television/radio coverage
- Network: CBC Television

The Academy of Canadian Cinema & Television's 5th Gemini Awards were held on December 4, 1990 to honour achievements in Canadian television. The awards show took place at the Metro Toronto Convention Centre and was broadcast on CBC Television.

== Best Dramatic Series ==
- E.N.G. – Atlantis Communications. Producers: Jennifer Black, Jeff King, Robert Lantos, R.B. Carney
- Danger Bay – Sunrise Films, Canadian Broadcasting Corporation, Disney Channel, Telefilm Canada. Producers: Harold Lee Tichenor, Paul Saltzman, Paul Quigley
- Road to Avonlea – Sullivan Entertainment. Producers: Trudy Grant, Kevin Sullivan
- Street Legal – Canadian Broadcasting Corporation. Producers: Brenda Greenberg, David Pears, Duncan Lamb

== Best Short Dramatic Program ==
- Saying Goodbye – The First Snowfall – TVOntario. Producers: John Brunton, Linda Rainsberry
- Pray for Me, Paul Henderson – Atlantis Films. Producers: Kim Todd, Michael MacMillan, Seaton McLean, Peter Sussman
- The Ray Bradbury Theater – To the Chicago Abyss – Atlantis Films, Alberta Filmworks, Ellipsanime, ITV Granada. Producers: Arvi Liimatainen, Ray Bradbury, Peter Sussman, Jonathan Goodwill, Seaton McLean
- Life After Hockey – Great North Productions. Producer: Andy Thomson

== Best TV Movie ==
- Where the Spirit Lives – Screen Door. Producers: Heather Haldane, Eric Jordan, Mary Young Leckie, Paul Stephens
- E.N.G. – Pilot – Atlantis Communications. Producers: Jennifer Black, Jeff King, Robert Lantos, R.B. Carney
- Divided Loyalties – History Productions. Producers: Gerry Rochon, Tom Gould
- Looking for Miracles – Sullivan Entertainment. Producers: Trudy Grant, Kevin Sullivan

== Best Comedy Program or Series ==
- Material World – Canadian Broadcasting Corporation. Producers: Katie Ford, Joe Partington
- Mosquito Lake – Canadian Broadcasting Corporation, Producers Group International. Producers: Charles Falzon, Carol Commisso

== Best Documentary Program ==
- The Journal – At the Lodge – Canadian Broadcasting Corporation. Producers: Sharon Bartlett, Jim Williamson, Christine Nielsen
- Batiya Bak! Producer: Werner Volkmer
- Half the Kingdom – National Film Board of Canada. Producers: Heather Marshall, Francine Zuckerman, Rina Fraticelli
- The Defender – National Film Board of Canada. Producers: Ches Yetman, Charles Konowal, Michael J. F. Scott
- Welcome Home – Columbia Pictures, The Rank Organisation. Producer: Susan Fleming

== Best Documentary Series ==
- The Nature of Things – Canadian Broadcasting Corporation. Producer: James Murray
- CBC at Six – Canadian Broadcasting Corporation. Producer: Slawko Klymkiw
- Imperfect Union: Canadian Labour and the Left – National Film Board of Canada. Producers: Don Hopkins, John Spotton, Arthur Hammond, John Taylor
- Ken Dryden's Home Game – Canadian Broadcasting Corporation. Producers: Peter Pearson, Michael Maclear

== Best Dramatic Mini-Series ==
- Love and Hate: The Story of Colin and JoAnn Thatcher – Canadian Broadcasting Corporation. Producer: Bernard Zukerman
- La Révolution française – Atlantis Films. Producers: Antoine de Clermont-Tonnerre, Alexandre Mnouchkine, Denis Héroux, Robert Lantos

== Best Performing Arts Program or Series or Arts Documentary Program or Series ==
- The Radical Romantic – Rhombus Media. Producers: Niv Fichman, Larry Weinstein
- I Just Wanna Dance – Canadian Broadcasting Corporation. Producers: Carol Moore-Ede, Sam Levene

== Best Variety Series ==
- Codco – Salter Street Films. Producers: J. William Ritchie, Stephen Reynolds, Jack Kellum, Michael Donovan
- Montreal International Comedy Festival – HBO. Producers: Andy Nulman, Gilbert Rozon
- The Tommy Hunter Show – Canadian Broadcasting Corporation. Producer: Joan Tosoni

== Best Variety Program ==
- k.d. lang's Buffalo Cafe- Canadian Broadcasting Corporation. Producer: Sandra Faire
- Juno Awards of 1990 – Canadian Broadcasting Corporation. Producer: Lynn Harvey
- Brian Orser: Skating Free – Canadian Broadcasting Corporation. Producer: Morgan Earl
- Rita MacNeil: Flying On Her Own – Canadian Broadcasting Corporation. Producer: Cliff Jones
- The Magic of Aladdin – Primedia Productions, British Columbia Broadcasting System, Canadian Broadcasting Corporation. Producer: Pat Ferns

== Best Information Series ==
- The Journal – Canadian Broadcasting Corporation. Producer: Mark Starowicz
- Marketplace – Canadian Broadcasting Corporation. Producers: Paul Moore, Sig Gerber
- Monitor – Canadian Broadcasting Corporation. Producer: Joy Crysdale
- Venture – Canadian Broadcasting Corporation. Producer: Duncan McEwan
- W5 – CTV Television Network. Producers: Peter Rehak, Don McQueen

== Best Light Information Series ==
- On the Road Again – Canadian Broadcasting Corporation. Producer: Karl Nerenberg
- A Question of Leadership. Producer: Ted Remerowski
- The NewMusic – CHUM Limited. Producers: Moses Znaimer, Denise Donlon
- CityLine – CHUM Limited. Producers: Moses Znaimer, Chrissie Rejman, Marcia Martin
- Live It Up! – Canadian Television Network. Producers: Dianne Buckner, Sharon Seto, Jack McGaw

== Best Information Segment ==
- the fifth estate – Beyond the Law – Canadian Broadcasting Corporation. Producers: Brian Hosking, Doug Pike, Michael Allder, Jim Hong, Hana Gartner
- Monitor – Canadian Broadcasting Corporation. Producers: Jeffrey Kofman, Paul Seeler, Kathy Priestman, Michelle Metivier, Terence McKeown
- Venture – Canadian Broadcasting Corporation. Producers: Nora Pratt, Steve Tonon, John Westheuser, Andy McBreartry
- CBC News – Escaping Justice – Canadian Broadcasting Corporation. Producers: Gloria Lowen, Cecil Rosner, Ray Bourrier, Stu Loeb, Ross Rutherford
- the fifth estate – Searching for the Past – Canadian Broadcasting Corporation. Producers: Hilary Brown, Slawko Klymkiw, John Scully, Peter Zin, Richard Lewchuk

== Best Animated Program or Series ==
- Babar – Nelvana, Ellipsanime. Producers: Michael Hirsh, Patrick Loubert, Clive A. Smith
- Anniversary – National Film Board of Canada. Producer: Robert Forget
- The Railway Dragon – Lacewood Productions, Hinton Animation Studios. Producers: Gerald Tripp, Sheldon S. Wiseman

== Best Youth Program or Series ==
- Talkin’ About AIDS – Atlantis Films. Producers: Rachel Low, Daphne Ballon, Seaton McLean
- The Party’s Over – Frame 30 Productions. Producers: Hardy Shafer, Michael Hamm
- YTV Rocks – YTV. Producer: Joanne P. Jackson

== Best Children’s Program or Series ==
- Raffi in Concert with the Rise and Shine Band – Devine Videoworks Production, Troubadour Records. Producers: Raffi, Richard Mozer, David Devine
- Dear Aunt Agnes – TVOntario. Producer: Heather Conkie
- Fred Penner's Place – Oak Street Music. Producer: Randy Roberts
- Under the Umbrella Tree – Canadian Broadcasting Corporation, Noreen Young Productions. Producer: Noreen Young

== Best Sports Program or Series ==
- XIV Commonwealth Games – Canadian Broadcasting Corporation. Producers: Laurence Kimber, Doug Sellars
- 1989 Triple Crown – Canadian Broadcasting Corporation. Producer: Dave Naylor
- Moon of the Desperados – Cinema Cartel. Producer: Jeth Weinrich
- Sportsline – Global Television Network. Producer: Jim Tatti
- The 1989 CIAU Vanier Cup – TSN. Producer: Bruce Perrin

== Best Special Event Coverage ==
- CBC News – The Meech Lake Accord – Canadian Broadcasting Corporation. Producers: Arnold Amber, Tom Kavanagh, Elly Alboim
- CBC News – The NDP Leadership Convention – Canadian Broadcasting Corporation. Producers: Arnold Amber, Tom Kavanagh, Elly Alboim, David Nayman
- CTV News – 1990 Liberal Convention – Canadian Television Network. Producer: Eric Morrison

== Best Direction in a Dramatic Program or Mini-Series ==
- Francis Mankiewicz – Love and Hate: The Story of Colin and JoAnn Thatcher (CBC)
- Brad Turner – C.B.C.'s Magic Hour – Pray For Me Paul Henderson (Atlantis Films)
- Bruce Pittman – Where the Spirit Lives (Screen Door)
- Kevin Sullivan – Looking for Miracles (Sullivan Entertainment)
- Paul Cowan – Justice Denied (NFB)

== Best Direction in a Dramatic or Comedy Series ==
- Stuart Gillard – Road to Avonlea (Sullivan Entertainment)
- René Bonnière – Diamonds – Life is a Lot Like Hockey (Alliance Entertainment/ Grosso-Jacobson Productions)
- Mark Sobel – Diamonds – Separate Ways (Alliance Entertainment/ Grosso-Jacobson Productions)
- David Winning – Friday the 13th: The Series – Jack in the Box (Lexicon Productions/Triumph Entertainment/Variety Artists International/Hometown Films/Paramount Television)
- Randy Bradshaw – Night Heat (Alliance Entertainment/ Grosso-Jacobson Productions)

== Best Direction in a Variety or Performing Arts Program or Series ==
- John Blanchard – The Kids in the Hall (Broadway Video/CBC)
- Larry Weinstein – The Radical Romantic (Rhombus Media)
- Ron Meraska – Juno Awards of 1990 (CBC)
- Ron Meraska – Brian Orser: Skating Free (CBC)
- James Weyman, Peter Weyman – Fiddleville (Close Up Films)

== Best Direction in an Information or Documentary Program or Series ==
- John Zaritsky – Frontline – Born in Africa (PBS)
- Werner Volkner – Batiya Bak!
- Francine Zuckerman, Roushell Goldstein – Half the Kingdom (NFB)
- Stephen Low – The Defender (NFB)
- Nigel Markham – Pelts: Politics of the Fur Trade (NFB)

== Best Writing in a Dramatic Program or Mini-Series ==
- Suzette Couture – Love and Hate: The Story of Colin and JoAnn Thatcher (CBC)
- Malcolm MacRury – Pray for Me, Paul Henderson (Atlantis Films)
- Edwina Follows – Saying Goodbye – Thunder in My Head (TVOntario)
- Keith Ross Leckie – Where the Spirit Lives (Screen Door)

== Best Writing in a Dramatic Series ==
- R.B. Carney – E.N.G. – Special Segment (Atlantis Communications)
- Wayne Grigsby – E.N.G. – Your Place or Mine (Atlantis Communications)
- Jim Henshaw – Friday the 13th: The Series (Lexicon Productions/Triumph Entertainment/Variety Artists International/Hometown Films/Paramount Television)
- Michael O'Connell, Derek McGrath – My Secret Identity – Toe to Toe (Sunrise Films/Scholastic Corporation/Telefilm Canada/Universal Television)
- Bill Murtagh, Elliot Stern – My Secret Identity – Off the Record (Sunrise Films/Scholastic Corporation/Telefilm Canada/Universal Television)

== Best Writing in a Comedy or Variety Program or Series ==
- Dave Foley, Kevin McDonald, Mark McKinney, Scott Thompson, Bruce McCulloch – The Kids in the Hall (Broadway Video/CBC)
- Paul Pogue, Jane Ford – Material World (CBC)
- Stuart Northey, Martha Kehoe, Joan Tosoni – The Tommy Hunter Show (CBC)
- Cliff Jones – Rita MacNeil: Flying On Her Own (CBC)
- Joe Bodolai, David Flaherty, Morgan Earl, Martin Short – 4th Gemini Awards (CBC)

== Best Writing in an Information/Documentary Program or Series ==
- John Zaritsky – Born in Africa (PBS)
- Werner Volkner – Batiya Bak!
- Stephen Low – The Defender (NFB)
- Rachel Low, Daphne Ballon – Talkin’ About AIDS (Atlantis Films)
- Les Harris, Andrew Johnson – By the Seat of Their Pants (Canamedia Productions)

== Best Performance by an Actor in a Leading Role in a Dramatic Program or Mini-Series ==
- Kenneth Welsh – Love and Hate: The Story of Colin and JoAnn Thatcher (CBC)
- Jack Langedijk – Divided Loyalties (History Productions)
- Greg Spottiswood – Looking for Miracles (Sullivan Entertainment)
- Louis Del Grande – Sanity Clause (CBC)

== Best Performance by an Actress in a Leading Role in a Dramatic Program or Mini-Series ==
- Michelle St. John – Where the Spirit Lives (Screen Door)
- Jennifer Dale – Saying Goodbye – Thunder in My Head (TVOntario)
- Kate Nelligan – Love and Hate: The Story of Colin and JoAnn Thatcher (CBC)

== Best Performance by an Actor in a Continuing Leading Dramatic Role ==
- Art Hindle – E.N.G. (Atlantis Communications)
- C. David Johnson – Street Legal (CBC)
- Pat Mastroianni – Degrassi Junior High (Playing With Time, Inc.)
- Duncan Waugh – Degrassi Junior High (Playing With Time, Inc.)
- Bruno Gerussi – The Beachcombers (CBC)

== Best Performance by an Actress in a Continuing Leading Dramatic Role ==
- Jackie Burroughs – Road to Avonlea (Sullivan Entertainment)
- Sarah Polley – Road to Avonlea (Sullivan Entertainment)
- Stacie Mistysyn – Degrassi High (Playing With Time, Inc.)
- Angela Deiseach – Degrassi High (Playing With Time, Inc.)
- Marsha Moreau – My Secret Identity (Sunrise Films/Scholastic Corporation/Telefilm Canada/Universal Television)

== Best Guest Performance in a Series by an Actor or Actress ==
- Victoria Snow – Street Legal (CBC)
- Wayne Robson – E.N.G. (Atlantis Communications)
- Frances Hyland – E.N.G. (Atlantis Communications)
- Colleen Dewhurst – Road to Avonlea (Sullivan Entertainment)
- Leslie Toth – T. and T. (Nelvana/Qintex Entertainment)

== Best Performance by an Actor in a Supporting Role ==
- Joe Flaherty – Looking for Miracles (Sullivan Entertainment)
- Karl Pruner – E.N.G. (Atlantis Communications)
- Shawn Lawrence – Saying Goodbye – The First Snowfall (TVOntario)
- Eugene Lipinski – Love and Hate: The Story of Colin and JoAnn Thatcher (CBC)
- Michael Ball – The Private Capital (CBC)

== Best Performance by an Actress in a Supporting Role ==
- Ann-Marie MacDonald – Where the Spirit Lives (Screen Door)
- Sherry Miller – E.N.G. (Atlantis Communications)
- Mary Beth Rubens – E.N.G. (Atlantis Communications)
- Lally Cadeau – Road to Avonlea (Sullivan Entertainment)
- Ocean Hellman – Anything to Survive (Saban/Scherick Productions)

== Best Performance in a Variety or Performing Arts Program or Series ==
- k.d. lang – k.d. lang's Buffalo Cafe (CBC)
- Tommy Hunter – The Tommy Hunter Show (CBC)
- Mary Margaret O'Hara – It's a Razorbacks Christmas Barbeque (CBC)
- Karen Kain – Karen Kain: Dancing in the Moment (CBC)
- Blue Rodeo – Video Hits (CBC)

== Gordon Sinclair Award for Broadcast Journalism ==
- Peter Mansbridge – The National – CBC News (CBC)
- Hana Gartner – the fifth estate (CBC)
- Bob McKeown – the fifth estate (CBC)
- Sheila MacVicar – the fifth estate (CBC)

== Best Reportage ==
- Jerry Thompson – The Journal – At the Lodge (CBC)
- Kelly Crowe – CBC at Six (CBC)
- Patrick Brown – The National – CBC News – Preying on Immigrants (CBC)

== Best Anchor or Interviewer ==
- Norm Perry – Canada AM (CTV)
- Ken Dryden – Ken Dryden's Home Game (CBC)
- Wayne Rostad – On the Road Again (CBC)
- Shirley Solomon – The Shirley Show (Adderley Productions)
- Valerie Pringle – Midday (Canadian Broadcasting Corporation)

== Best Sportscaster ==
- Brian Williams – XIV Commonwealth Games (CBC)
- Ron MacLean – Molson Legend’s Hockey Night in Canada (CBC)
- Jim Hughson – NHL Tonight Playoffs (TSN)

== Best Photography in a Dramatic Program or Series ==
- Vic Sarin – Love and Hate: The Story of Colin and JoAnn Thatcher (CBC)
- Manfred Guthe – Road to Avonlea (Sullivan Entertainment)
- Vic Sarin – Divided Loyalties (History Productions)
- Brian Thomson – Looking for Miracles (Sullivan Entertainment)
- Brian R.R. Hebb – The Campbells (Settler Film Productions/CTV/Telefilm Canada/Fremantle)

== Best Photography in a Comedy, Variety or Performing Arts Program or Series ==
- Ron Stannett – Rita MacNeil: Flying On Her Own (CBC)
- Tom Swartz, Alan MacPherson – A David Foster Christmas Card (CTV)
- Lawrence Barclay, Damir Chytil – Veronique (CBC)

== Best Photography in an Information/Documentary Program or Series ==
- Michael Boland – Ken Dryden's Home Game (CBC)
- Michael Sweeney – The Journal – At the Lodge (CBC)
- Michael Boland – The Struggle for Democracy – The Curtain Rises (CBC)
- Keith Whelan – La Tabatière (CBC)

== Best News Photography ==
- Geof Richards – CTV News (CTV)
- Daniel McIvor – CBC News – Dying Yanomami (CBC)
- Rick Dobrucki – The National – CBC News (CBC)

== Best Picture Editing in a Dramatic Program or Series ==
- Michael Todd – Where the Spirit Lives (Screen Door)
- Marke Slipp – The Ray Bradbury Theater – To the Chicago Abyss (Atlantis Films/Alberta Filmworks/Ellipsanime/ITV Granada)
- Gordon McClellan – Love and Hate: The Story of Colin and JoAnn Thatcher (CBC)
- David Goard, Gary L. Smith – Friday the 13th: The Series – The Prophecies (Lexicon Productions/Triumph Entertainment/Variety Artists International/Hometown Films/Paramount Television)
- Vincent Kent – Sanity Clause (CBC)

== Best Picture Editing in an Information/Documentary Program or Series ==
- Les Harris – By the Seat of Their Pants (Canamedia Productions)
- Murray Green – The Journal – At the Lodge (CBC)
- Jacques Milette – Man Alive (CBC)
- Steve Thomson – Venture (CBC)
- Paul Michel Thibault, Roger Lefebvre, Sarah Lalumiere – On the Road Again (CBC)

== Best Production Design or Art Direction ==
- Russell Chick, Armando Sgrignuoli – The Private Capital (CBC)
- Dale Heslip – Juno Awards of 1990 (CBC)
- Stephen Roloff – Friday the 13th: The Series (Lexicon Productions/Triumph Entertainment/Variety Artists International/Hometown Films/Paramount Television)
- Sheila Haley, Eric Fraser, Douglas Higgins – Bordertown (Alliance Communications)
- John Halfpenny, Chris Labonte, Charles E. Bastien – Beetlejuice (Nelvana/The Geffen Film Company/Warner Bros. Television Studios/Tim Burton Productions)

== Best Costume Design ==
- Martha Mann – Road to Avonlea (Sullivan Entertainment)
- Michael Harris – The Private Capital (CBC)
- Michel Crête – Cirque du Soleil: Nouvelle Expérience (Cirque du Soleil)
- Glenne Campbell – Bordertown (Alliance Communications)
- John Macfarlane – La Ronde (BBC)

== Best Sound in a Dramatic Program or Series ==
- David Appleby, Wayne Griffin, David Evans, Paul Massey, Steve Joles – Divided Loyalties (History Productions)
- Erick Hoppe, Arnie Stewart, Allen Ormerod, Scott Purdy, Gillian Jones – Street Legal (CBC)
- Daniel Pellerin, Owen Langevin, Ken Porter, Jeremy Maclaverty – Looking for Miracles (Sullivan Entertainment)
- Elius Caruso, Ian Hendry, Dave Templeton, Carla Prouse, Terry Burke – My Secret Identity (Sunrise Films/Scholastic Corporation/Telefilm Canada/Universal Television)
- Tim Archer, W. Michael Beard, Tom Hidderley, Rick Ellis, Anthony Lancett – The Hitchhiker ((Chester/Perlmutter/Markowitz Productions)

== Best Sound in a Comedy, Variety or Performing Arts Program or Series ==
- Scott Purdy, Jane Tattersall, John Martin, Paul Massey – Carnival of Shadows (Rhombus Media/CBC)
- Barry Gilmore, Jean-Pierre Joutel, John Martin, Brian Avery – The Radical Romantic (Rhombus Media)
- Mas Kikuta, Simon Bowers, Peter Mann, Howard Baggley – Juno Awards of 1990 (CBC)
- Paul Massey, Brian Avery, John Martin, Denis Blais, Gillian Jones – For the Whales (Rhombus Media)
- Jacques Montminy – Songs from the Big Valley (CBC)

== Best Sound in an Information/Documentary Program or Series ==
- Floyd Burrell, Mas Kikuta, Paul Massey – Behind the Mask (The Really Useful Group)
- David Picoski – The Journal – At the Lodge (CBC)
- Terence McKeown – Monitor (CBC)

== Best Original Music Score for a Program or Mini-Series ==
- Victor Bateman, Danny Greenspoon – My Grandparents Had a Hotel (Karen Shopsowitz)
- John Welsman – Looking for Miracles (Sullivan Entertainment)
- Eric Robertson – Love and Hate: The Story of Colin and JoAnn Thatcher (CBC)
- Eric Robertson – The Private Capital (CBC)
- Larry Crosley – The Teddy Bears' Picnic (Lacewood Productions/Hinton Animation Studios/CTV)

== Best Original Music Score for a Series ==
- John Welsman – Road to Avonlea (Sullivan Entertainment)
- Hagood Hardy – Road to Avonlea (Sullivan Entertainment)
- Milan Kymlicka – Babar (Nelvana/Ellipsanime)
- Henri Lorieau – Bordertown (Alliance Communications)
- Judith Henderson – The Smoggies (Cinar)

== Special awards ==
- Canada Award: Batiya Bak!
- The John Labatt Entertainment Award for Most Popular Program – Trudy Grant, Kevin Sullivan – Road to Avonlea
- Margaret Collier Award: Ted Allan
- John Drainie Award: Allan McFee
- Earle Grey Award: Jan Rubeš
- Outstanding Achievement in Make-Up and Hair Design – Judi Cooper Sealy, Beverly Schechtman – Second City Television
- Outstanding Technical Achievement – Brian Purdy – Building The Dome: 2 1/2 Years in 2 1/2 Minutes
- The Multiculturalism Award – Werner Volkner, Batiya Bak!
- Outstanding Contribution to Canadian Television – Frank Shuster, Johnny Wayne – Wayne and Shuster
