= 7th Gemini Awards =

1993 awards for Canadian television

- Date: March 1993
- Venue: Metro Toronto Convention Centre

Television/radio coverage
- Network: CBC Television

The Academy of Canadian Cinema & Television's 7th Gemini Awards were held in March 1993 to honour achievements in Canadian television. The awards show took place at the Metro Toronto Convention Centre and was broadcast on CBC Television.

== Best Dramatic Series ==
- E.N.G. – Atlantis Communications. Producers: Jennifer Black, Jeff King, Robert Lantos, R.B. Carney
- Neon Rider – (Virtue/Rekert Productions, Atlantis Films. Producers: Justis Greene, Danny Virtue, Winston Rekert, Michael MacMillan
- Road to Avonlea – Sullivan Entertainment. Producers: Trudy Grant, Kevin Sullivan
- Street Legal – Canadian Broadcasting Corporation. Producers: Nicholas Rose, Duncan Lamb, Brenda Greenberg

== Best Short Dramatic Program ==
- Scales of Justice: "Regina v. Stewart" – Canadian Broadcasting Corporation. Producer: George Jonas
- Kurt Vonnegut's Monkey House – Atlantis Films, South Pacific Pictures. Producers: Michael MacMillan, Chris Bailey, Jonathan Goodwill
- The Ray Bradbury Theater – Alberta Filmworks, Atlantis Films, Ellipsanime, ITV Granada. Producers: Peter Sussman, Chris Bailey, Mary Kahn

== Best TV Movie ==
- Scales of Justice: "Regina v. Nelles" – Canadian Broadcasting Corporation. Producer: George Jonas
- Christmas On Division Street – Columbia Pictures Television, Higher Ground Productions, Morrow-Heus Productions, Procter & Gamble Productions, The Guber-Peters Company, Western International Communications. Producers: Colleen Nystedt, Tony Allard
- Black Death – CTV Television Network, Libra Pictures, Saban Entertainment, Sunrise Films, Telefilm Canada. Producers: Steven Levitan, Lynn Raynor, Paul Saltzman, Edgar Scherick
- Rapture – Paragon Entertainment, Tristar Pictures. Producers: Richard Borchiver, Jon Slan
- School’s Out – Playing With Time, Inc. Producers: Kit Hood, Linda Schuyler

== Best Comedy Program or Series ==
- The Kids in the Hall – Broadway Video, Canadian Broadcasting Corporation. Producers: Lorne Michaels, Jeffrey Berman, Cindy Park, Joe Forristal
- Maniac Mansion – Atlantis Films. Producers: Jamie Paul Rock, Eugene Levy, Barry Jossen, Peter Sussman, Michael Short
- The Red Green Show – S&S Productions. Producer: Steve Smith

== Donald Brittain Award for Best Documentary Program ==
- Timothy Findley: Anatomy of a Writer – National Film Board of Canada. Producers: Don Haig, Terence Macartney-Filgate
- Man Alive – Canadian Broadcasting Corporation. Producer: Halya Kuchmij
- On the Eighth Day: Perfecting Mother Nature – Cinéfort. Producer: Mary Armstrong
- Threads of Hope – Canamedia Productions. Producers: Jane Harris, Les Harris
- Women in the Shadows – National Film Board of Canada, Direction Films. Producers: Christine Welsh, Signe Johansson

== Best Documentary Series ==
- The Valour and the Horror – Canadian Broadcasting Corporation, National Film Board of Canada, Galafilm. Producers: Arnie Gelbart, André Lamy
- Brain Sex – Discovery Channel. Producers: Richard Price, Anne Moir, Pat Ferns
- Millennium: Tribal Wisdom and the Modern World – Biniman Productions, KCET, BBC, Global Television Network. Producers: Adrian Malone, Richard Meech, Nancy Button, Michael Grant
- My Partners My People – Canadian Television Network. Producers: Maria Campbell, Tom Radford, Andy Thompson
- The Price of Power – Canadian Broadcasting Corporation. Producer: Noah Erenberg

== Best Dramatic Mini-Series ==
- Conspiracy of Silence – Canadian Broadcasting Corporation. Producer: Bernard Zukerman
- Bethune: The Making of a Hero – Filmline International. Producers: Pieter Kroonenburg, Nicolas Clermont
- The Sound and the Silence – Atlantis Films, South Pacific Pictures. Producers: Luciano Lisi, Jon Glascoe, Kim Todd, Michael MacMillan

== Best Performing Arts Program or Series or Arts Documentary Program or Series ==
- Cirque du Soleil: Nouvelle Expérience – Cirque du Soleil. Producer: Hélène Dufresne
- Adrienne Clarkson Presents – Canadian Broadcasting Corporation. Producers: Adrienne Clarkson, Gordon Stewart
- Canadian Brass: Home Movies – Rhombus Media. Producer: Niv Fichman
- Standards – Canadian Broadcasting Corporation. Producers: Carol Moore-Ede, Jeremy Podeswa, Ingrid Veninger

== Best Variety Series ==
- The Best of Just for Laughs – Les Films Rozon. Producers: Andy Nulman, Gilbert Rozon
- Country Beat – Canadian Broadcasting Corporation. Producer: Steve Glassman
- The Tommy Hunter Show – Canadian Broadcasting Corporation. Producer: Lynn Harvey

== Best Variety Program ==
- Brian Orser: Night Moves – Canadian Broadcasting Corporation. Producers: Sandra Bezic, Morgan Earl
- 6th Gemini Awards|1992 Gemini Awards – Canadian Broadcasting Corporation. Producers: Maria Topalovich, Joe Bodolai, Jon Nicholls, Peter Hayman, Sean Kiely
- Friday Night! with Ralph Benmergui – Canadian Broadcasting Corporation. Producers: Ralph Benmergui, Joe Bodolai, Jon Nicholls, Peter Hayman
- Happy Birthday Canada! – Canadian Broadcasting Corporation. Producers: Darlene Harber, Annette Antoniak, Ken Gibson, Gordon James
- Howie – CBS, 3 Arts Entertainment. Producers: Peter Sussman, Morris Abraham, Michael Rotenberg, Sean Ryerson, Howie Mandel

== Best Information Series ==
- the fifth estate – Canadian Broadcasting Corporation. Producers: Kelly Crichton, David Nayman
- For the Love of the Game – TSN. Producer: Aiken Scherberger
- Venture – Canadian Broadcasting Corporation. Producer: Duncan McEwan
- W5 With Eric Malling – CTV Television Network. Producer: Peter Rehak
- Contact with Hana Gartner – Canadian Broadcasting Corporation. Producers: Alan Burke, Robin Taylor, Anne Bayin, Larry Zolf

== Best Light Information Series ==
- LIFE: The Program – Canadian Broadcasting Corporation. Producer: Duncan McEwan
- Street Cents – Canadian Broadcasting Corporation. Producer: Jonathan Finkelstein, Janet Thompson, John Nowlan
- Sunday Arts Entertainment – Canadian Broadcasting Corporation. Producer: Carol Moore-Ede
- On the Road Again – Canadian Broadcasting Corporation. Producer: Karl Nerenberg
- Prisoners of Gravity – TVOntario. Producer: Gregg Thurlbeck

== Best Information Segment ==
- For the Love of the Game – TSN. Producer: Aiken Scherberger
- Venture – Canadian Broadcasting Corporation. Producers: Ben Matilainen, Nora Pratt, R. Gamble, Steve Thomson
- Contact with Hana Gartner – Canadian Broadcasting Corporation. Producers: Bruce Griffen, Larry Zolf, Hana Gartner, Wes Blanchard, Michael Savoie
- LIFE: The Program – Canadian Broadcasting Corporation. Producers: Stephen Bourne, Lon Appleby, Danny Cook, Sheldon Beldick
- the fifth estate – Black and Blue – Canadian Broadcasting Corporation. Producers: Julian Sher, Jennifer Campbell, Dan Burke, Gerry Wagschal, Roger Leclerc

== Best Animated Program or Series ==
- The Adventures of Tintin – Nelvana, Ellipsanime. Producers: Michael Hirsh, Patrick Loubert, Clive A. Smith
- Nilus the Sandman: The Boy Who Dreamed Christmas – Cambium Film & Video Productions, Delaney & Friends Cartoon Productions. Producers: Chris Delaney, Arnie Zipursky, Bruce Glawson

== Best Youth Program or Series ==
- The Odyssey – Water Street Pictures. Producer: Michael Chechik
- Degrassi Talks – Playing With Time, Inc. Producers: Kit Hood, Linda Schuyler
- Road Movies – Why Not Productions, Canadian Broadcasting Corporation. Producer: Barbara Barde
- Wonderstruck – Canadian Broadcasting Corporation. Producers: Bob McDonald, Debra Mathews, Helga Haberfellner, Lasley Williams, Paul Goodman

== Best Children’s Program or Series ==
- Shining Time Station – Catalyst Entertainment, YTV. Producers: Rick Siggelkow, Britt Allcroft, Nancy Chapelle
- Alligator Pie – Canadian Broadcasting Corporation. Producer: Cindy Hamon-Hill
- Lost in the Barrens II: The Curse of the Viking Grave – Atlantis Films. Producers: Michael J. F. Scott, Derek Mazur, Daphne Ballon, Seaton McLean, Michael MacMillan
- OWL/TV – Canadian Television Network. Producers: Annabel Slaight, Christopher Howard

== Best Sports Program or Series ==
- Sports Weekend – Canadian Broadcasting Corporation. Producers: Joan Mead, Doug Sellars
- Bob Izumi’s Real Fishing Show – Izumi’s Outdoor. Producers: Douglas Volpel, Wayne Izumi
- CBC at Six – Canadian Broadcasting Corporation. Producers: Bill Kendrick, Bruce Dowbiggin
- CTV Sports Presents Year in Review – Canadian Television Network. Producers: Dean Bender, Jeffrey Mather, Doug Beeforth, John McLarty, Laura Mellanby
- SportsCentre – TSN. Producer: Michael Day

== Best Special Event Coverage ==
- 1992 Olympic Winter Games – Canadian Broadcasting Corporation. Producers: Robert Moir, Doug Sellars
- Canada In Question – Canadian Television Network. Producers: Tobias Fisher, Robert Conroy, Louis Cooper, Eric Morrison, Fiona Conway
- CBC News National Town Hall – Canadian Broadcasting Corporation. Producers: Slawko Klymkiw, Elly Alboim, Christopher Waddell

== Best Direction in a Dramatic Program or Mini-Series ==
- Francis Mankiewicz – Conspiracy of Silence (CBC)
- John Kent Harrison – The Sound and the Silence (Atlantis Films/South Pacific Pictures)
- Allan Kroeker – Forever Knight (Paragon Entertainment)
- Eric Till – To Catch a Killer (Creative Entertainment Group/Libra Pictures/Telestories Entertainment)
- George Bloomfield – Wojeck: Out of the Fire (CBC)

== Best Direction in a Dramatic or Comedy Series ==
- Allan King – Road to Avonlea (Sullivan Entertainment)
- Bruce Pittman – Beyond Reality (Paragon Entertainment)
- René Bonnière – E.N.G. – Public Enemy (Atlantis Communications)
- George Bloomfield – Neon Rider (Virtue/Rekert Productions/Atlantis Films)
- Paul Lynch – Top Cops – John Kosek/Richard Voorhees/Doug Edgington/David Miles (C.B.I. of Canada)

== Best Direction in a Variety or Performing Arts Program or Series ==
- Jacques Payette – Cirque du Soleil: Nouvelle Expérience (Cirque du Soleil)
- Jeremy Podeswa – Standards (CBC)
- Joan Tosoni – 6th Gemini Awards|1992 Gemini Awards (CBC)
- Don Marks – Indian Time 2: Fly with Eagles (Global TV)
- Barbara Willis Sweete, Bernar Hébert – Pictures on the Edge (CBC)

== Best Direction in an Information or Documentary Program or Series ==
- Brian McKenna – The Valour and the Horror (CBC/NFB/Galafilm)
- Susan Teskey – the fifth estate (CBC)
- Alan Gough – A Promise Kept (Signboard Hill Productions)
- John Paskievich – Sedna: The Making of a Myth (NFB)
- Larry Weinstein – Life and Death of Manuel de Falla (Rhombus Media

== Best Writing in a Dramatic Program or Mini-Series ==
- Suzette Couture – Conspiracy of Silence (CBC)
- Ted Allan – Bethune: The Making of a Hero (Filmline International)
- Stan Daniels – Kurt Vonnegut's Monkey House (Atlantis Films/South Pacific Pictures)
- Heather Conkie – Beethoven Lives Upstairs (Devine Entertainment)
- Douglas Bowie – Grand Larceny (CBC)

== Best Writing in a Dramatic Series ==
- David Barlow – Max Glick (Sunrise Films/FosterFilm Productions)
- Heather Conkie – Road to Avonlea (Sullivan Entertainment)
- Charles Lazer – Road to Avonlea – Another Point of View (Sullivan Entertainment)
- Peter Lauterman, Angelo Stea – E.N.G. (Atlantis Communications)
- Wayne Grigsby, Barbara Samuels – E.N.G. – The Best Defence (Atlantis Communications)

== Best Writing in a Comedy or Variety Program or Series ==
- Mary Walsh, Cathy Jones, Tommy Sexton, Greg Malone – Codco (Salter Street Films)
- Louise Moon, Roger Fredericks – Street Cents (CBC)
- Bernard Rothman, Shari Lewis – Lamb Chop's Play-Along (Paragon Entertainment)
- Mike MacDonald – My House, My Rules (Howard Lapides Productions)
- Martha Kehoe – Country Gold (CBC)

== Best Writing in an Information/Documentary Program or Series ==
- Brian McKenna, Terence McKenna – The Valour and the Horror (CBC/NFB/Galafilm)
- Linden MacIntyre – the fifth estate (Canadian Broadcasting Corporation)
- Susan Teskey – the fifth estate (Canadian Broadcasting Corporation)
- Susan A'Court, Barry Ewart Stone – All Ways Welcome (TVOntario)
- Terence McKenna, Jerry Thompson – The Journal (Canadian Broadcasting Corporation)

== Best Performance by an Actor in a Leading Role in a Dramatic Program or Mini-Series ==
- Michael Mahonen – Conspiracy of Silence (CBC)
- Stephen Ouimette – Conspiracy of Silence (CBC)
- Michael Riley – To Catch a Killer (Creative Entertainment Group/Libra Pictures/Telestories Entertainment)
- Neil Munro – Beethoven Lives Upstairs (Devine Entertainment)

== Best Performance by an Actress in a Leading Role in a Dramatic Program or Mini-Series ==
- Kate Nelligan – The Diamond Fleece (Moving Image Productions)
- Vanessa Vaughan – The Sound and the Silence (Atlantis Films/South Pacific Pictures)
- Jennifer Phipps – Ann & Maddy
- Jennifer Dale – Grand Larceny (CBC)

== Best Performance by an Actor in a Continuing Leading Dramatic Role ==
- Cedric Smith – Road to Avonlea (Sullivan Entertainment)
- C. David Johnson – Street Legal (CBC)
- Zachary Bennett – Road to Avonlea (Sullivan Entertainment)
- Eric Peterson – Street Legal (CBC)
- Art Hindle – E.N.G. (Atlantis Communications)
- Geraint Wyn Davies – Forever Knight (Paragon Entertainment)

== Best Performance by an Actress in a Continuing Leading Dramatic Role ==
- Sara Botsford – E.N.G. (Atlantis Communications)
- Sarah Polley – Road to Avonlea (Sullivan Entertainment)
- Sonja Smits – Street Legal (CBC)
- Cynthia Dale – Street Legal (CBC)

== Best Guest Performance in a Series by an Actor or Actress ==
- Kate Nelligan – Road to Avonlea – After the Honeymoon (Sullivan Entertainment)
- Robin Gammell – E.N.G. (Atlantis Communications)
- Martin Short – Maniac Mansion (Atlantis Films)
- Ocean Hellman – Neon Rider – Labour Day (Virtue/Rekert Productions/Atlantis Films)
- Barry Flatman – Secret Service (Secret Vision)

== Best Performance by an Actor in a Supporting Role ==
- Jonathan Welsh – E.N.G. (Atlantis Communications)
- Nigel Bennett – Forever Knight (Paragon Entertainment)
- Robert Joy – Grand Larceny (CBC)
- Kenneth Welsh – Grand Larceny (CBC)
- Michael Mahonen – Road to Avonlea (Sullivan Entertainment)

== Best Performance by an Actress in a Supporting Role ==
- Brooke Johnson – Conspiracy of Silence (CBC)
- Catherine Disher – Grand Larceny (CBC)
- Theresa Tova – E.N.G. (Atlantis Communications)
- Lally Cadeau – Road to Avonlea (Sullivan Entertainment)
- Patricia Hamilton – Road to Avonlea (Sullivan Entertainment)

== Best Performance in a Comedy Program or Series ==
- Scott Thompson, Mark McKinney, Kevin McDonald, Bruce McCulloch, Dave Foley – The Kids in the Hall (Broadway Video/CBC)
- Michel Courtemanche, The Vestibules – The Best of Just for Laughs (Les Films Rozon)
- Mike MacDonald – My House, My Rules (Howard Lapides Productions)

== Best Performance or Host in a Variety Program or Series ==
- Anne Murray, k.d. lang – Country Gold (CBC)
- Katarina Witt, Brian Orser – Brian Orser: Night Moves (CBC)
- Howie Mandel – Howie (CBS/3 Arts Entertainment)
- Ofra Harnoy, Loreena McKennitt – Juno Awards of 1992 (CBC)
- Michelle Wright – Michelle (CBC)

== Best Performance in a Performing Arts Program or Series ==
- Barenaked Ladies – Ear to the Ground – Barenaked Ladies (CBC)
- Meryn Cadell – Ear to the Ground – Barenaked Ladies (CBC)
- Shirley Douglas – Passage of the Heart (Black Hat Productions)

== Gordon Sinclair Award for Broadcast Journalism ==
- Linden MacIntyre – the fifth estate (CBC)
- Victor Malarek – the fifth estate (CBC)
- Peter Mansbridge – The National – CBC News (CBC)

== Best Reportage ==
- Patrick Brown – The National – CBC News (CBC)
- Joe Schlesinger – The National – CBC News (CBC)
- Ross Rutherford – CBC News – Strangers at the Door (CBC)
- Ross Rutherford – CBC News – Trouble in the Air (CBC)

== Best Anchor or Interviewer ==
- Peter Mansbridge – CBC News National Town Hall (CBC)
- Hana Gartner – Contact with Hana Gartner (CBC)
- Hana Gartner – the fifth estate (Canadian Broadcasting Corporation)
- Linden MacIntyre – the fifth estate (Canadian Broadcasting Corporation)
- Lloyd Robertson – CTV News (CTV)

== Best Host in a Light Information, Variety or Performing Arts Program or Series ==
- Adrienne Clarkson – Adrienne Clarkson Presents (CBC)
- Tommy Hunter – The Tommy Hunter Show (CBC)
- Bob Izumi – Bob Izumi’s Real Fishing Show (Izumi’s Outdoor)
- Leslie Nielsen – 12th Genie Awards (CBC)
- Shirley Solomon – The Shirley Show – The New Rape Law (Adderley Productions)

== Best Sportscaster ==
- Bruce Dowbiggin – CBC at Six (CBC)
- Ron MacLean – Albertville 1992: XVI Olympic Winter Games (CBC)
- Brian Williams – Albertville 1992: XVI Olympic Winter Games (CBC)
- Jim Hughson – (TSN)
- Buck Martinez – (TSN)

== Best Photography in a Dramatic Program or Series ==
- Rene Ohashi – The Sound and the Silence (Atlantis Films/South Pacific Pictures)
- Raoul Coutard, Mike Molloy – Bethune: The Making of a Hero (Filmline International)
- Paul Sarossy – Grand Larceny (CBC)
- Albert J. Dunk – Forever Knight (Paragon Entertainment)
- Malcolm Cross – Street Legal (CBC)

== Best Photography in a Comedy, Variety or Performing Arts Program or Series ==
- Sylvain Brault – Cirque du Soleil: Nouvelle Expérience (Cirque du Soleil)
- Donald Spence, James Cassidy, Richard Fox – Adrienne Clarkson Presents (Canadian Broadcasting Corporation)
- Peter Bower, Adam Swica – Canadian Brass (Rhombus Media)
- Gilray Densham – Brian Orser: Night Moves (CBC)
- Gilray Densham – Juno Awards of 1992 (CBC)

== Best Photography in an Information/Documentary Program or Series ==
- Vic Sarin, Michael Boland – Millennium: Tribal Wisdom and the Modern World (Biniman Productions/KCET/BBC/Global TV)
- John Grierson – A Promise Kept (Signboard Hill Productions)
- Bob Gibson – Flight of the Sky Hawks (Yaletown Productions)
- Steve Adamcryck – Man Alive (CBC)
- Damir I. Chytil – The Nahanni and Rebekah Dawn (CBC)

== Best News Photography ==
- Steve Rendall – The National – CBC News (CBC)
- Danny Ross – The National – CBC News (CBC)
- Dave Hall – The National – CBC News (CBC)

== Best Picture Editing in a Dramatic Program or Series ==
- Ralph Brunjes – Conspiracy of Silence (CBC)
- Rik Morden – Beethoven Lives Upstairs (Devine Entertainment)
- Bill Goddard – Alfred Hitchcock Presents (Paragon Entertainment)
- Yves Langlois – Golden Fiddles (South Australian Film Corporation/Wacko Entertainment)
- Gordon McClellan – Road to Avonlea (Sullivan Entertainment)

== Best Picture Editing in a Comedy, Variety or Performing Arts Program or Series ==
- Bill Goddard – Country Gold (CBC)
- Christopher Cooper, Tom Joerin – The Kids in the Hall (Broadway Video/CBC)
- Vidal Béïque – Cirque du Soleil: Nouvelle Expérience (Cirque du Soleil)
- Dave Grein – Veronique: Wish You Were Here
- Peter Henderson – The Tragically Hip – Full Fledged Vanity (CBC)

== Best Picture Editing in an Information/Documentary Program or Series ==
- Ron Trotter – Street Noise (YTV)
- Daniel Sekulich – A Promise Kept (Signboard Hill Productions)
- David New – Life and Death of Manuel de Falla (Rhombus Media
- Jeth Weinrich, Jayne Morris Berry – Heartland (Seven24 Films/Dynamo Films)
- Ron Piggott – Man Alive (CBC)

== Best Production Design or Art Direction ==
- Susan Longmire – The Sound and the Silence (Atlantis Films/South Pacific Pictures)
- Ronald Fauteux, Michel Proulx, Enrique Alarcón, Ren Huixing – Bethune: The Making of a Hero (Filmline International)
- Paul Ames, Armando Sgrignuoli – Grand Larceny (CBC)
- Sheila Haley – Bordertown (Alliance Communications)
- George Liddle – Golden Fiddles (South Australian Film Corporation/Wacko Entertainment)

== Best Costume Design ==
- Martha Mann – The Sound and the Silence (Atlantis Films/South Pacific Pictures)
- Olga Dimitrov – Bethune: The Making of a Hero (Filmline International)
- Dominique Lemieux – Cirque du Soleil: Nouvelle Expérience (Cirque du Soleil)
- Michael Harris – Grand Larceny (CBC)
- Glenne Campbell – Bordertown (Alliance Communications)

== Best Sound in a Dramatic Program or Series ==
- Dino Pigat, Gerry King, Brian Newby, Penny Hozy, Jim Hopkins – Conspiracy of Silence (CBC)
- Susan Hammond, Greg Chapman, Steve Gorman, David Appleby, Andy Malcolm – Beethoven Lives Upstairs (Devine Entertainment)
- Jacqueline Cristianini, Eric Batut, Paul A. Sharpe – Christmas On Division Street – Columbia Pictures Television/Higher Ground Productions/Morrow-Heus Productions/Procter & Gamble Productions/The Guber-Peters Company/Western International Communications)
- Terry Gordica, Kevin Howard, Steve Foster, Chaim Gilad, James Porteous – Forever Knight – Dark Night (Paragon Entertainment)
- Daniel Pellerin, Brian Newby, Jeremy Maclaverty – Grand Larceny (CBC)

== Best Sound in a Comedy, Variety or Performing Arts Program or Series ==
- Simon Bowers – Friday Night! with Ralph Benmergui -(CBC)
- John Thomson, Rob Sim – Country Gold (CBC)
- Mas Kikuta, Ian Dunbar, Dave Ripka, Simon Bowers, Peter Mann – Juno Awards of 1992 (CBC)
- Peter Cracknell, Floyd Burrell, Peter J. Moore, Brian Radford – Paul Janz (CBC)

== Best Sound in an Information/Documentary Program or Series ==
- Alison Clark, Terence McKeown, Dino Pigat – Millennium: Tribal Wisdom and the Modern World (Biniman Productions/KCET/BBC/Global TV)
- Keith Henderson – The Journal (Canadian Broadcasting Corporation)
- Debra Rurak, David Husby, Paul A. Sharpe – Women in the Shadows (NFB/Direction Films)
- William L. Campbell, Gael MacLean – Everest – Climb for Hope (Yaletown Productions)

== Best Original Music Score for a Program or Mini-Series ==
- Oscar Peterson, Warren "Slim" Williams – In the Key of Oscar (NFB)
- Mark Korven – Grand Larceny (CBC)
- William Ross, David Foster – Golden Fiddles (South Australian Film Corporation/Wacko Entertainment)
- Rob Bryanton, Jim Folk – Eli’s Lesson (Mind's Eye Entertainment)
- Braun Farnon, Robert Smart – Heartland (Seven24 Films/Dynamo Films)

== Best Original Music Score for a Series ==
- Micky Erbe, Maribeth Solomon – Street Legal (CBC)
- Graeme Coleman – Max Glick (Sunrise Films/FosterFilm Productions)
- Fred Mollin – Beyond Reality (Paragon Entertainment)
- John Welsman – Road to Avonlea (Sullivan Entertainment)
- Milan Kymlicka – The Legend of White Fang (Cinar)

== Special awards ==
- Canada Award: Peter Flemington, Rita Deverell – It's About Time
- The John Labatt Entertainment Award for Most Popular Program – Trudy Grant, Kevin Sullivan – Road to Avonlea
- Margaret Collier Award: George R. Robertson
- John Drainie Award: Barbara Frum
- Earle Grey Award: Barbara Hamilton
