= 6th Gemini Awards =

1992 awards for Canadian television

- Date: March 1992
- Venue: Metro Toronto Convention Centre

Television/radio coverage
- Network: CBC Television

The Academy of Canadian Cinema & Television's 6th Gemini Awards were held in March 1992 to honour achievements in Canadian television. There were no awards issued in 1991, so this year’s awards covered productions from 1991 and 1990. The awards show took place at the Metro Toronto Convention Centre and was broadcast on CBC Television.

== Best Dramatic Series ==
- E.N.G. – Atlantis Communications. Producers: Jennifer Black, Jeff King, Robert Lantos, R.B. Carney
- Degrassi Junior High – Playing With Time, Inc. Producers: Kit Hood, Linda Schuyler
- Mom P.I. – Atlantis Films, Canadian Broadcasting Corporation. Producers: Jonathan Goodwill, Chris Haddock, Michael MacMillan
- Road to Avonlea – Sullivan Entertainment. Producers: Trudy Grant, Kevin Sullivan
- Urban Angel – Telescene Films, Canadian Broadcasting Corporation. Producers: Jamie Brown, Paul E. Painter, Robin Spry

== Best Short Dramatic Program ==
- Kurt Vonnegut's Monkey House – Atlantis Films, South Pacific Pictures. Producers: Michael MacMillan, Gordon Mark, Jonathan Goodwill, Harold Lee Tichenor
- Inside Stories – Canadian Broadcasting Corporation. Producers: Stephen Onda, Ian McLaren
- Peggy. Producer: Chris Zimmer
- RSVP – Frameline. Producers: Laurie Lynd, Paul Brown

== Best TV Movie ==
- Deadly Betrayal: The Bruce Curtis Story – Atlantis Films, Canadian Broadcasting Corporation, National Film Board of Canada, Citadel Communications. Producers: Barry Cowling Seaton McLean, Peter Sussman
- Princes in Exile – Cinepix, Canadian Broadcasting Corporation, National Film Board of Canada. Producers: André Link, Colin Neale, Irene Litinsky, John Dunning, Marrin Canell
- C.B.C.'s Magic Hour – The Rookies – Atlantis Films. Producers: Martin Harbury, Michael MacMillan, Seaton McLean, Peter Sussman
- Getting Married in Buffalo Jump – Canadian Broadcasting Corporation. Producers: Flora Macdonald, Peter Kelly

== Best Comedy Program or Series ==
- Codco – Salter Street Films. J. William Ritchie, Stephen Reynolds, Jack Kellum, Michael Donovan
- Maniac Mansion – Atlantis Films. Producers: Jamie Paul Rock, Eugene Levy, Seaton McLean, Peter Sussman, Michael Short
- The Kids in the Hall – Broadway Video, Canadian Broadcasting Corporation. Producers: Lorne Michaels, Joe Forristal

== Donald Brittain Award for Best Social/Political Documentary Program ==
- Island of Whales – National Film Board of Canada. Producers: Jerry Appleton, Gillian Darling-Kovanic, Jack Silberman, George Johnson
- Between Two Worlds – Investigative Productions. Producer: Peter Raymont
- Distress Signals – Canadian Broadcasting Corporation, TVOntario, Channel 4 Films, Orbit Films, National Film Board of Canada. Producers: Tom Perlmutter, John Walker, Kent Martin
- The Nature of Things – James Bay: The Wind That Keeps On Blowing – Canadian Broadcasting Corporation. Producer: Nancy Archibald
- Transplant: The Breath of Life – Camera One Productions. Producer: Elias Petras

== Best Documentary Series ==
- The Nature of Things – Canadian Broadcasting Corporation. Producer: James Murray
- Man Alive – Canadian Broadcasting Corporation. Producer: Louise Lore
- End of an Empire. Producers: Kitson Vincent, David M. Ostriker
- For the Love of the Game – TSN. Producer: Aiken Scherberger
- The Hand of Stalin – BBC, October Films. Producers: Tom Roberts, Bill Nemtin

== Best Dramatic Mini-Series ==
- Young Catherine – Canadian Television Network, Consolidated Entertainment, Lenfilm, Primedia Productions, Tele München, Turner Entertainment. Producers: Stephen Smallwood, Michael Deeley, Pat Ferns
- The First Circle – Technisonor. Producer: Claude Héroux

== Best Performing Arts Program or Series or Arts Documentary Program or Series ==
- Letter from Wingfield Farm – Primedia Productions. Producers: Ann O’Brian, Pat Ferns
- Le Dortoir – Rhombus Media. Producer: Niv Fichman
- Master Peter's Puppet Show – Rhombus Media. Producers: Niv Fichman, Larry Weinstein
- Musicians in Exile – Jacqués Holender Films. Producer: Jacqués Holender
- Pas De Deux with Paul and Isabelle Duchesnay – Canadian Broadcasting Corporation. Producer: Bob McKeown
- Sisters – Primedia Productions. Producers: Ann O’Brian, Pat Ferns

== Best Variety Series ==
- The Tommy Hunter Show – Canadian Broadcasting Corporation. Producer: Lynn Harvey

== Best Variety Program ==
- Tall in the Saddle – Insight Productions. Producer: John Brunton
- Juno Awards of 1991 – Canadian Broadcasting Corporation. Producer: Lynn Harvey
- Back to the Beanstalk. Producer: Bernard Rothman
- The Heritage Quiz – Canadian Broadcasting Corporation. Producer: Susan Stranks

== Best Information Series ==
- The Journal – Canadian Broadcasting Corporation. Producer: Mark Starowicz
- the fifth estate – Canadian Broadcasting Corporation. Producer: Kelly Crichton
- The Nature of Things – The Genetic Revolution – Canadian Broadcasting Corporation. Producer: Tobias Fisher
- Venture – Canadian Broadcasting Corporation. Producer: Duncan McEwan
- W5 With Eric Malling – CTV Television Network. Producer: Garry Dwyer-Joyce

== Best Light Information Series ==
- The NewMusic – CHUM Limited. Producers: Moses Znaimer, Denise Donlon
- LIFE: The Program – Canadian Broadcasting Corporation. Producer: Duncan McEwan
- On the Road Again – Canadian Broadcasting Corporation. Producer: Karl Nerenberg
- The Shirley Show – Adderley Productions. Producer: Les Kottler
- Sunday Arts Entertainment – Canadian Broadcasting Corporation. Producer: Carol Moore-Ede

== Best Information Segment ==
- W5 With Eric Malling – CTV Television Network. Producers: Michael Hannan, Robert Holmes, Leora Eisen
- Venture – The New Contract – Canadian Broadcasting Corporation. Producers: Willa Marcus, Steve Tonon, Carlos Esteves, Mike MacClymont
- The NewMusic – CHUM Limited. Producers: Alfred Tonna, Jennifer Morton
- CBC at Six – Canadian Broadcasting Corporation. Producers: Jerry Borys, Lyn Whitham, Peter Zin, Susan Papp, Kathy Priestman
- CBC News – License to Steal – Canadian Broadcasting Corporation. Producers: Ross Rutherford, Cecil Rosner, Gloria Lowen, John Bronevich, Douglas Coolidge

== Best Animated Program or Series ==
- Babar – Nelvana, Ellipsanime. Producers: Michael Hirsh, Patrick Loubert, Clive A. Smith
- The Woman Who Raised a Bear as Her Son – Lacewood Productions, Hinton Animation Studios, CTV Television Network. Producers: Gerald Tripp, Sheldon S. Wiseman
- Madeline – Cinar. Producers: Ronald A. Weinberg, Micheline Charest

== Best Youth Program or Series ==
- C.B.C.'s Magic Hour – Lost in the Barrens – Atlantis Films, Muddy River Films, Canadian Broadcasting Corporation. Producers: Michael J. F. Scott, Derek Mazur, Joan Scott, Seaton McLean, Michael McMillan
- Diary of a Teenage Smoker – Atlantis Films. Producers: Rachel Low, Daphne Ballon
- The NewMusic – Rock ‘n Roll ‘n Reading – CHUM Limited. Producers: Moses Znaimer, Denise Donlon
- Too Close for Comfort – Wild Ginger Productions. Producers: Lezlie Wagman, Gay Hawley

== Best Children’s Program or Series ==
- The Garden – Heartland Motion Pictures. Producer: Stephen Onda
- Take Off – Canamedia Productions. Producers: Hilary Pryor, Les Harris
- Join In! – TVOntario. Producer: Jed MacKay

== Best Sports Program or Series ==
- Molson Hockey Night in Canada on CBC: 1991 Stanley Cup Playoffs – Canadian Broadcasting Corporation. Producers: Larry Isaac, Mark Askin, Ron Harrison
- Donohue's Legends – Nation's Capital Television. Producers: Jack Donohue, Tom Aziz
- Michael Smith: Anything is Possible – Canadian Broadcasting Corporation. Producers: Robert MacAskill, Lee Herberman
- Sports Weekend – Canadian Broadcasting Corporation. Producers: Joan Mead, Doug Sellars
- Sportsline – Global Television Network. Producer: Jim Tatti

== Best Special Event Coverage ==
- CBC News – Canadian Broadcasting Corporation. Producers: Arnold Amber, Edith Champagne
- Canada Cup Final – Canadian Broadcasting Corporation. Producers: Doug Beeforth, Scott Moore, John Hudson
- CBC News – Canadian Broadcasting Corporation. Producers: Arnold Amber, Tom Kavanagh, Fred Parker, George Hoff

== Best Direction in a Dramatic Program or Mini-Series ==
- Graeme Campbell – Deadly Betrayal: The Bruce Curtis Story (Atlantis Films/CBC/NFB/Citadel Communications)
- Paul Lynch – Drop Dead Gorgeous (First Choice Canadian Communication Corp./Power Pictures)
- Laurie Lynd – RSVP (Frameline)
- Elise Swerhone – Mayor of Odessa
- Donald Shebib – The Little Kidnappers (CBC)

== Best Direction in a Dramatic or Comedy Series ==
- Stacey Stewart Curtis – Street Legal (CBC)
- Peter Rowe – E.N.G. – Final Cut (Atlantis Communications)
- Brad Turner – Mom P.I. – When Sally Met Bernie (Atlantis Films/CBC)
- Paul Shapiro – Mom P.I. – Time Wounds All Heels (Atlantis Films/CBC)
- Timothy Bond – Top Cops – Greg Armstrong/Kathy Burke (C.B.I. of Canada)

== Best Direction in a Variety or Performing Arts Program or Series ==
- Barbara Willis Sweete, Adrian Marthaler – Prokofiev by Two (Rhombus Media)
- Jacqués Holender – Musicians in Exile (Jacqués Holender Films)
- David Langer – La Maison Suspendue (Primedia Productions)
- Peter Weyman, Robert Lang – Mariposa: Under a Stormy Sky (Lyric Film and Video)
- Marla Digiacomo, Faith Feingold – Molson Canadian Rocks (CBC)

== Best Direction in an Information or Documentary Program or Series ==
- John Walker – The Hand of Stalin (BBC/October Films)
- Michael Poole – Island of Whales (NFB)
- F.M. Morrison – Man Alive – The Hero Among Us (CBC)
- Maya Gallus – Elizabeth Smart: On the Side of the Angels (Red Queen Productions)
- John Zaritsky – Frontline: My Doctor, My Lover (PBS)
- Elias Petras – Transplant: The Breath of Life (Camera One Productions)

== Best Writing in a Dramatic Program or Mini-Series ==
- Keith Ross Leckie – Deadly Betrayal: The Bruce Curtis Story (Atlantis Films/CBC/NFB/Citadel Communications)
- Joe Wiesenfeld – Princes in Exile (Cinepix/CBC/NFB)
- Silver Donald Cameron – Peggy
- John Frizzell – Getting Married in Buffalo Jump (CBC)
- M. Charles Cohen – The First Circle (Technisonor)

== Best Writing in a Dramatic Series ==
- Wayne Grigsby – E.N.G. – Ways and Means (Atlantis Communications)
- Chris Haddock – Mom P.I. (Atlantis Films/CBC)
- Heather Conkie – Road to Avonlea (Sullivan Entertainment)
- Suzette Couture – Road to Avonlea (Sullivan Entertainment)
- Marlene Matthews – Road to Avonlea (Sullivan Entertainment)

== Best Writing in a Comedy or Variety Program or Series ==
- Mary Walsh, Cathy Jones, Tommy Sexton, Greg Malone, Andy Jones – Codco (Salter Street Films)
- Eugene Levy, David Flaherty, Michael Short – Maniac Mansion (Atlantis Films)
- Patrick Granleese – The Woman Who Raised a Bear as Her Son (Lacewood Productions/Hinton Animation Studios/CTV)
- Todd Thicke, Jim Slotek, Ted Woloshyn, Ian Anderson – 1991 NHL Awards: A Celebration of Excellence (CBC)
- Mike MacDonald – Mike MacDonald: On Target (Howard Lapides Productions)

== Best Writing in an Information/Documentary Program or Series ==
- John Zaritsky – Frontline: My Doctor, My Lover (PBS)
- Linden MacIntyre, Neil Docherty – the fifth estate (Canadian Broadcasting Corporation)
- Claude Vickery – The Code of Silence (TVOntario)
- Eric Till – The Sweetest Spring
- Amanda McConnell – The Nature of Things – Herschel: An Island of Flowers (CBC)

== Best Performance by an Actor in a Leading Role in a Dramatic Program or Mini-Series ==
- Bernard Behrens – Saying Goodbye (TVOntario)
- Len Cariou – Kurt Vonnegut's Monkey House (Atlantis Films/South Pacific Pictures)
- Miguel Fernandes – Kurt Vonnegut's Monkey House (Atlantis Films/South Pacific Pictures)
- Sean Roberge – C.B.C.'s Magic Hour – The Prom (Atlantis Films)
- Yannick Bisson – C.B.C.'s Magic Hour – The Rookies (Atlantis Films)
- Victor Garber – The First Circle (Technisonor)

== Best Performance by an Actress in a Leading Role in a Dramatic Program or Mini-Series ==
- Brenda Bazinet – Saying Goodbye (TVOntario)
- Wendy Crewson – Getting Married in Buffalo Jump (CBC)
- Julia Ormond – Young Catherine (CTV/Consolidated Entertainment/Lenfilm/Primedia Productions/Tele München/Turner Entertainment)
- Corinne Touzet – The First Circle (Technisonor)

== Best Performance by an Actor in a Continuing Leading Dramatic Role ==
- Eric Peterson – Street Legal (CBC)
- C. David Johnson – Street Legal (CBC)
- Christopher Plummer – Counterstrike (Atlantis Communications/Grosso-Jacobson Productions)
- Simon MacCorkindale – Counterstrike (Atlantis Communications/Grosso-Jacobson Productions)
- Mickey Rooney – The Adventures of the Black Stallion (Atlantis Communications/Atlantique Productions)

== Best Performance by an Actress in a Continuing Leading Dramatic Role ==
- Jackie Burroughs – Road to Avonlea (Sullivan Entertainment)
- Sara Botsford – E.N.G. (Atlantis Communications)
- Amanda Stepto – Degrassi Junior High (Playing With Time, Inc.)
- Cynthia Dale – Street Legal (CBC)
- Jennifer Dale – No Place Like Home (CHCH-DT)

== Best Guest Performance in a Series by an Actor or Actress ==
- Michelle St. John – E.N.G. – A Long Way from Hopeful (Atlantis Communications)
- Maurice Godin – E.N.G. (Atlantis Communications)
- Geza Kovacs – Mom P.I. (Atlantis Films/CBC)
- Ron White – Mom P.I. (Atlantis Films/CBC)
- Ian Tracey – Mom P.I. (Atlantis Films/CBC)
- Marilyn Lightstone – Max Glick (Sunrise Films/FosterFilm Productions)

== Best Performance by an Actor in a Supporting Role ==
- Kenneth Welsh – Deadly Betrayal: The Bruce Curtis Story (Atlantis Films/CBC/NFB/Citadel Communications)
- Arthur Grosser – Urban Angel (Telescene Films/CBC)
- Anthony Sherwood – Street Legal (CBC)
- Gordon Michael Woolvett – Princes in Exile (Cinepix/CBC/NFB)
- Ian Tracey – C.B.C.'s Magic Hour – The Rookies (Atlantis Films)
- Bruce Greenwood – The Little Kidnappers (CBC)

== Best Performance by an Actress in a Supporting Role ==
- Sarah Polley – Lantern Hill (Sullivan Entertainment)
- Sherry Miller – E.N.G. (Atlantis Communications)
- Gema Zamprogna – Road to Avonlea (Sullivan Entertainment)
- Lally Cadeau – Road to Avonlea (Sullivan Entertainment)
- Marion Gilsenan – Getting Married in Buffalo Jump (CBC)
- Leah Pinsent – The Little Kidnappers (CBC)

== Best Performance in a Comedy Program or Series ==
- Sandra Shamas – Adrienne Clarkson Presents (CBC)
- Mary Walsh, Cathy Jones, Tommy Sexton, Greg Malone, Andy Jones – Codco (Salter Street Films)
- George Buza – Maniac Mansion (Atlantis Films)
- Scott Thompson, Mark McKinney, Kevin McDonald, Bruce McCulloch, Dave Foley – ‘’The Kids in the Hall’’ (Broadway Video/CBC)

== Best Performance or Host in a Variety Program or Series ==
- k.d. lang, Tommy Banks – 1990 Canadian Country Music Awards (CBC)
- Kurt Browning – Tall in the Saddle (Insight Productions)
- Celine Dion – Juno Awards of 1991 (CBC)
- 20/20 – Molson Canadian Rocks Showdown ‘90 (CBC)

== Best Performance in a Performing Arts Program or Series ==
- Diana Leblanc – Legacy
- Carbone 14 – Le Dortoir (Rhombus Media)
- Laurel Paetz – Sisters (Primedia Productions)
- Karen Kain – Alice (National Ballet of Canada/(CBC)

== Gordon Sinclair Award for Broadcast Journalism ==
- Pamela Wallin – CTV News (CTV)
- Brian Stewart – The Journal (CBC)
- Linden MacIntyre – the fifth estate (Canadian Broadcasting Corporation)
- Joe Schlesinger – The National – CBC News (CBC)

== Best Reportage ==
- Joe Schlesinger – The National – CBC News (CBC)
- Ross Rutherford – CBC News – A Question of Trust (CBC)
- Diana Swain – The National – CBC News – Preying on Immigrants (CBC)
- Ross Rutherford – CBC News – What About the Kids? (CBC)
- Dennis Trudeau – Newswatch (CBC)

== Best Anchor or Interviewer ==
- Lloyd Robertson – CTV News – The Gulf War (CTV)
- Ralph Benmergui – Midday (Canadian Broadcasting Corporation)
- Linden MacIntyre – the fifth estate (Canadian Broadcasting Corporation)
- Peter Mansbridge – The National – CBC News (CBC)
- Peter Downie – Man Alive (CBC)

== Best Host in a Light Information, Variety or Performing Arts Program or Series ==
- David Suzuki – The Nature Connection with David Suzuki (Janson Media)
- Adrienne Clarkson – Adrienne Clarkson Presents (CBC)
- Mary Tyler Moore – Just for Laughs ‘91 (Les Films Rozon)
- Wayne Rostad – On the Road Again (CBC)
- Dini Petty – The Dini Petty Show (Baton Broadcast System)

== Best Sportscaster ==
- Ron MacLean – Molson Legend’s Hockey Night in Canada (CBC)
- Don Chevrier – Canada Cup Final (CBC)
- John Wells – (TSN)
- Don Wittman – CFL on CBC – 1990 Grey Cup (CBC)
- Brian Williams – 1990 Molson Indy Vancouver (CBC)

== Best Photography in a Dramatic Program or Series ==
- Ron Orieux – The First Circle (Technisonor)
- Malcolm Cross – Street Legal (CBC)
- Ernest Day – Young Catherine (CTV/Consolidated Entertainment/Lenfilm/Primedia Productions/Tele München/Turner Entertainment)
- Miklós Lente – The Little Kidnappers (CBC)
- Steve Danyluk – Heritage Minutes (CBC)

== Best Photography in a Comedy, Variety or Performing Arts Program or Series ==
- Maris H. Jansons – Tall in the Saddle (Insight Productions)
- Alain Dostie – Le Dortoir (Rhombus Media)
- Robert Fresco – Musicians in Exile (Jacqués Holender Films)
- Hannes Meyer, Michael Storey – Prokofiev by Two (Rhombus Media)
- Gilray Densham – Alice (National Ballet of Canada/(CBC)

== Best Photography in an Information/Documentary Program or Series ==
- Leonard Gilday – The Nature of Things – Herschel: An Island of Flowers (CBC)
- Maurice Chabot – The Journal (CBC)
- Mark Mackay – The 12 Steps: Recovering From Addictions
- Rhett Morita – Diary of a Teenage Smoker (Atlantis Films)
- Volodi Ledenov – Polar Bridge: A Canadian-Russian Arctic Odyssey (Keg Productions)

== Best News Photography ==
- Jerry Beauchamp – The National – CBC News (CBC)
- Howard Cooper – CTV News – The Gulf War (CTV)
- Doug Gamey – Global News – The Hunt for Canadian Soldier Eric William Schumacher (Global TV)

== Best Picture Editing in a Dramatic Program or Series ==
- Ralph Brunjes – Deadly Betrayal: The Bruce Curtis Story (Atlantis Films/CBC/NFB/Citadel Communications)
- Frank Irvine – Kurt Vonnegut's Monkey House (Atlantis Films/South Pacific Pictures)
- Richard Todd – Princes in Exile (Cinepix/CBC/NFB)
- Jeff Warren – C.B.C.'s Magic Hour – The Rookies (Atlantis Films)
- David B. Thompson – Top Cops (C.B.I. of Canada)

== Best Picture Editing in a Comedy, Variety or Performing Arts Program or Series ==
- Stephan Fanfara – Maniac Mansion (Atlantis Films)
- Miguel Raymond – Le Dortoir (Rhombus Media)
- Peter Armstrong, Gilles Saindon – Tall in the Saddle (Insight Productions)
- Peter Ovens – Sunday Arts Entertainment (CBC)
- Jürg Ingold, Grant Ducsharm – Prokofiev by Two (Rhombus Media)
- Peter Svab – Shumka: Return of the Whirlwind (Sulyma Productions)

== Best Picture Editing in an Information/Documentary Program or Series ==
- Jack Kuper – A Day in the Warsaw Ghetto: A Birthday Trip in Hell (Kuper Productions)
- Christopher Cooper – Diary of a Teenage Smoker (Atlantis Films)
- Mike Earls – A White Man’s Game? (Discovery Channel)
- Kent Nason, Shelagh MacKenzie – Remember Africville (NFB)
- Charles Konowal, Harvey Spak – The Old Believers (NFB)

== Best Production Design or Art Direction ==
- Kelly Forrest, Andrew Deskin – C.B.C.'s Magic Hour – Lost in the Barrens (Atlantis Films/Muddy River Films/CBC)
- Harold Thrasher, Natalya Vasilyeva – Young Catherine (CTV/Consolidated Entertainment/Lenfilm/Primedia Productions/Tele München/Turner Entertainment)
- Dale Heslip – Juno Awards of 1991 (CBC)
- Sheila Haley – Bordertown (Alliance Communications)
- Hilary Pryor, Catherine Hahn – Take Off (Canamedia Productions)

== Best Costume Design ==
- Martha Mann – Lantern Hill (Sullivan Entertainment)
- Larisa Konnikova – Young Catherine (CTV/Consolidated Entertainment/Lenfilm/Primedia Productions/Tele München/Turner Entertainment)
- Frances Dafoe – Back to the Beanstalk.
- Karen L. Matthews – Max Glick (Sunrise Films/FosterFilm Productions)
- Glenne Campbell – Bordertown (Alliance Communications)
- Joyce Schure – Battle of the Bulge (Artizzan Films)

== Best Sound in a Dramatic Program or Series ==
- Rick Ellis, Bruce Nyznik, Allan Scarth – Deadly Betrayal: The Bruce Curtis Story (Atlantis Films/CBC/NFB/Citadel Communications)
- Nolan Roberts, David Midgley, Daniel Latour – E.N.G. (Atlantis Communications)
- Gillian Jones, Erik Hoppe, Allen Ormerod – Street Legal – Murder (CBC)
- Gorbor Vanay, Les Halman, Hans Peter Strobl – Princes in Exile (Cinepix/CBC/NFB)
- Leon Johnson, Joe Grimaldi, Steven Cole – The Challengers (Lauron Productions)

== Best Sound in a Comedy, Variety or Performing Arts Program or Series ==
- Daniel Pellerin – Musicians in Exile (Jacqués Holender Films)
- Tom Mather, David Evans, Allen Ormerod – Maniac Mansion – Dad’s Bummed Out (Atlantis Films)
- Ian Hendry, Doug McClement, Brian Avery – Mariposa: Under a Stormy Sky (Lyric Film and Video)
- Steve Wener, François Deschamps, René Beaudry – The Rise and Fall of Humpty Dumpty (Cinar/France Animation)
- Paul Myers, Matthew Hutchinson, John Dunkerley – Nights in the Gardens of Spain (EuroArts Music International)

== Best Sound in an Information/Documentary Program or Series ==
- Chris Davies – The Journal (CBC)
- Ian Hendry, John Martin, Alison Clark – Between Two Worlds (Investigative Productions)
- Sergio Penhas-Roll, James Ho Lim, Scott Chisholm – Man Alive (CBC)
- Brent Haliskie – W5 With Eric Malling (CTV)
- Jean-Pierre Joutel, Haida Paul, Michael McGee – As Long as the Rivers Flow (Tamarack Productions)
- Robert Bocking, Jim Frank, Bob Predovich – Profiles Of Nature (Ellis Entertainment)

== Best Original Music Score for a Program or Mini-Series ==
- Edmund Eagan – The Woman Who Raised a Bear as Her Son (Lacewood Productions/Hinton Animation Studios/CTV)
- Mark Korven – Between Two Worlds (Investigative Productions)
- Gaëtan Gravel, Bill Vorn – Le Dortoir (Rhombus Media)
- Mark Snow – The Little Kidnappers (CBC)
- Jeff Fisher, Judith Henderson – The Rise and Fall of Humpty Dumpty (Cinar/France Animation)

== Best Original Music Score for a Series ==
- John Welsman – Road to Avonlea (Sullivan Entertainment)
- Graeme Coleman – Max Glick (Sunrise Films/FosterFilm Productions)

== Special awards ==
- Canada Award: Pnina Bloch, Jennifer Campbell, Andy Blicq – Drums
- The John Labatt Entertainment Award for Most Popular Program – Trudy Grant, Kevin Sullivan – Road to Avonlea
- Margaret Collier Award: Harry Rasky
- John Drainie Award: Gordon Pinsent
- Earle Grey Award: Colleen Dewhurst
- Gemini Award for Outstanding Technical Achievement – Telesat, Sky Vision
