= Brenda Bazinet =

Canadian actress

Brenda Bazinet (born July 18, 1956) is a Canadian actress. She is a recipient of the Gemini Award and has been nominated four times for the Dora Mavor Moore Award.

Bazinet was born in 1956 in Saskatchewan and grew up there. She attended high school in Stoughton, after which she studied fine arts at the University of Regina.

Bazinet and two friends founded the 5 & Dime Productions theater company in 1985. She has also taught at Actors Workshop, Actraworks, Citadel Theatre/Banff Professional Theatre Program, George Brown Theatre School, Humber College, and Ryerson University.

She won a Gemini Award for Best Actress in a Television Film or Miniseries at the 6th Gemini Awards in 1992, for her performance in an episode of the drama anthology series Saying Goodbye.

== Select credits ==
- 33 Brompton Place (1982)
- Siege (1983) as Barbara
- In This Corner (1986) as Heather
- Alex: The Life of a Child (1986) as Barbara Keator
- Dancing in the Dark (1986) as Susan
- Martha, Ruth and Edie (1988) as Alice
- Saying Goodbye (1990) - Episode "A Grief Shared"
- To Catch a Killer (1992) as Alice Pearson
- Thicker Than Blood: The Larry McLinden Story (1994) as Mary
- A Holiday to Remember (1995) as Eve Stevens
- Hidden in America (1996) as Food Bank Worker
- Earth Final Conflict (1997) as Sara Good
- Lethal Vows (1999) as Dr. Addington
- Sins of the Father (2002) as Virginia Cherry
- Redemption: The Stan Tookie Williams Story (2004) as Barbara's Agent
- Rabbittown (2006) as Harriet
- Burn Up (2008) as Marianne
- Shoot the Messenger (2016) as Susan Reeves
- Anne with an E (2017-2018) as Jeannie
- Utopia Falls (2020) as Gran Riel
- Dangerous (2021) as Linda Forrester
