= Saying Goodbye (TV series) =

- Country of origin: Canada
- No. of episodes: 5

Production
- Producer: Linda Rainsberry

Original release
- Network: TVOntario
- Release: October 23 – November 19, 1990

Saying Goodbye is a Canadian television drama anthology series, which aired on TVOntario in 1990. The series consisted of five half-hour short drama films about people grappling with death, either dealing with grief after the death of a loved one or confronting their own mortality. Each episode was paired with a half-hour studio panel discussion on bereavement moderated by Roy Bonisteel.

The series was also sold on videotape for use in palliative care and grief counselling education programs.

== Episodes ==
| No. | Title | Directed by | Written by | Original release date | Prod. code |
|---|---|---|---|---|---|
| 1 | "Thunder in My Head" | Eleanore Lindo | Edwina Follows | October 23, 1990 | 101 |
A mother of young children (Jennifer Dale) copes with the sudden death of her husband in an accident.
| 2 | "A Grief Shared" | Anthony Perris | Edwina Follows | October 30, 1990 | 102 |
A couple (Stewart Arnott and Brenda Bazinet) try to help their daughter come to terms with the death of their newborn baby.
| 3 | "A Home Alone" | Michael Franks | Edwina Follows, Mark Allan Kaplan, Evan Lieberman | November 5, 1990 | 103 |
An elderly widower (Bernard Behrens) has to learn how to live alone following the death of his wife.
| 4 | "A Promise Broken" | Richard Bugajski | Edwina Follows | November 12, 1990 | 104 |
A high school student's (Greg Spottiswood) best friend (David Matheson) commits suicide.
| 5 | "The First Snowfall" | Eric Till | Jim Osborne | November 19, 1990 | 105 |
After being diagnosed with terminal cancer, a woman (Kate Reid) decides to live out her remaining days at home rather than in the hospital.

== Critical response ==
John Haslett Cuff of The Globe and Mail praised the series as evidence that Canadians "can produce powerful, polished drama that doesn't ape American TV and actually has something interesting and important to communicate", and lamented that the series wasn't running on CBC Television so that the entire country could watch it.

== Awards ==
As the series run crossed over the eligibility cutoff dates for the Gemini Awards, the series was eligible for both the 5th Gemini Awards in 1990 and the 6th Gemini Awards in 1992.

| Award | Date of ceremony | Category | Nominees | Result | Reference |
|---|---|---|---|---|---|
| Gemini Awards | December 4, 1990 | Best Short Dramatic Program | "The First Snowfall" | Won | |
| Gemini Awards | December 4, 1990 | Best Actress in a Television Film or Miniseries | Jennifer Dale, "Thunder in My Head" | Nominated | |
| Gemini Awards | December 4, 1990 | Best Supporting Actor | Shawn Lawrence, "The First Snowfall" | Nominated | |
| Gemini Awards | December 4, 1990 | Best Writing in a Dramatic Program or Miniseries | Edwina Follows, "Thunder in My Head" | Nominated | |
| Gemini Awards | March 8, 1992 | Best Actor in a Television Film or Miniseries | Bernard Behrens, "A Home Alone" | Won | |
| Gemini Awards | March 8, 1992 | Best Actress in a Television Film or Miniseries | Brenda Bazinet, "A Grief Shared" | Won | |
