= Jack Langedijk =

Canadian theater director and actor (born 1956)

- Born: April 27, 1956 (age 70); Edmonton, Alberta, Canada
- Education: Concordia University; Sheridan College

Jack A. Langedijk (born April 27, 1956) is a Canadian actor, theatre director, and author.

== Education ==
Langedijk was born as one of ten children to Dutch immigrant parents and grew up on a farm in Milton, Ontario. He studied acting at Concordia University in Montreal and Sheridan College.

== Career ==
After graduation from university, Langedijk founded his own theater company and worked in this industry as a director for many stage performances, including often by Shakespeare.

In addition to his work in the theater, he is also active as a fictitious performer in many films and television series. He has, inter alia, smaller appearances in film productions such as Darkman II: The Return of Durant (1995) and episodes of series such as Relic Hunter and Mutant X.

He received a Gemini Award nomination for Best Actor in a Leading Role in a Dramatic Program or Mini-Series at the 5th Gemini Awards in 1990, for his performance as Joseph Brant in the television film Divided Loyalties.

Langedijk self-published his first novel, Because, in 2014.

== Filmography ==
=== Film ===
Year	Title	Role	Notes
1984	Evil Judgment	Dino	
1986	The Great Land of Small	Patrick O'Toole	
1986	Cat City	Additional voice	
1987	Jack Kerouac's Road: A Franco-American Odyssey	Jack Kerouac	Voice
1989	Blind Fear	Bo Fenner	
1990	Divided Loyalties	Joseph Brant	
1994	Mrs. Parker and the Vicious Circle	Valentine's Day Director	
1995	A Young Connecticut Yankee in King Arthur's Court	Ulrich	
1995	Darkman II: The Return of Durant	Rollo Latham	
1998	Captive	Sal Hoffman	
1998	For Hire	Vic Mann	
1998	The Lost World	Maple White	
1998	Out of Control	Frank	
1998	Dead End	Lt. Lido	
1998	Sublet	CIA Operative	
1999	When Justice Fails	Dave Dahlgren D.A.	
1999	The Secret Pact	Dean Raines	
2000	Left Behind: The Movie	Dirk Burton	
2001	February 15, 1839	Lieutenant Elliott	
2002	One Way Out	Corelli	

=== Television ===
Year	Title	Role	Notes
1986	Spearfield's Daughter	Driver Johnson	Miniseries
1987	Ford: The Man and the Machine	Uncredited	Television film
1990	The Final Heist	Decker	Television film
1991–1992	Urban Angel	Bob Vanderdan	14 episodes
1992	A Cry in the Night	Lawyer	Television film
1993	Flight from Justice	Jim	Television film
1994	RoboCop	Father Marks	Episode: "Provision 22"
1996	The Adventures of Sinbad	Drax	Episode: "The Prince Who Wasn't"
1996	Adventures of Smoke Bellew	Sitka Charlie	6 episodes
1997	The Call of the Wild	His Partner Pete	Television film
1997	Twists of Terror	Richard	Television film
1998	Loss of Faith	Jeremy Morton	Television film
1999	Bonanno: A Godfather's Story	Phil Mangano	Television film
1999	Psi Factor	Wayne Curtis	Episode: "Inertia"
2000	Livin' for Love: The Natalie Cole Story	NBC Executive	Television film
2001	Relic Hunter	Cyrus Lowe / Tsar	2 episodes
2001	The Pretender: Island of the Haunted	Brother Rinaldus, a monk	Television film
2002	Soul Food	Bob Jamieson	Episode: "Out with the Old..."
2002	Gleason	Herb Gleason	Television film
2002	Master Spy: The Robert Hanssen Story	FBI Man at Party	Television film
2003	Mutant X	Daniel Foster	Episode: "The Grift"
2003	Rudy: The Rudy Giuliani Story	William Bratton	Television film
2003, 2004	Sue Thomas: F.B.Eye	Various roles	3 episodes
2004	The Grid	Davi	6 episodes
2006	Skyland	Cortes	26 episodes
2012	The Adventures of Chuck and Friends	Mayor Goodwheels	Episode: "Mayor Chuck/Wallbashers"
2012	The Listener	Bill Lawrence	Episode: "Curtain Call"
2017–2018	Hotel Transylvania: The Series	Additional voices	5 episodes
