= Max Glick =

- Genre: Comedy drama
- Created by: Phil Savath; Stephen Foster
- Based on: The Outside Chance of Maximilian Glick by Morley Torgov
- Starring: Josh Garbe; Alec Willows; Linda Kash; Jan Rubeš; Susan Douglas Rubeš; Melyssa Ade; Jason Blicker
- Composer: Graeme Coleman
- Country of origin: Canada
- Original language: English
- No. of seasons: 2
- No. of episodes: 26

Production
- Executive producer: Stephen Foster
- Running time: 30 minutes
- Production companies: Glick Productions; Sunrise Films; FosterFilm Productions

Original release
- Network: CBC Television
- Release: November 5, 1990 – December 27, 1991

Max Glick is a Canadian television comedy-drama series, which aired on CBC Television from 1990 to 1991. Based on the Morley Torgov novel The Outside Chance of Maximilian Glick and its 1988 film adaptation, the series centred on Maximilian Glick, a young Jewish boy coming-of-age in Beausejour, Manitoba in the 1960s. Though set in Beausejour, the series was filmed on location in Vancouver and Agassiz, British Columbia.

== Synopsis ==
The series starred Josh Garbe as Max, Alec Willows and Linda Kash as his parents Henry and Sarah, Jan Rubeš and Susan Douglas Rubeš as his grandparents Augustus and Bryna, Melyssa Ade as his classmate and love interest Celia, and Jason Blicker as Rabbi Teitelman.

Jan and Susan Rubeš were the only cast members to reprise their roles from the film; Noam Zylberman, who had played Max in the film, was also originally slated to star in the series, but had undergone puberty and grown too tall to believably play a 13-year-old by the time the series entered production.

The series was created by Stephen Foster and Phil Savath, who had been the producer and screenwriter of the original film.

Critics commonly compared the series to the contemporaneous American series The Wonder Years.

== Transmissions ==
| Season | Episodes | Originally released | |
| Season | Episodes | First released | Last released |
|---|---|---|---|
| 1 | 13 | November 5, 1990 | March 4, 1991 |
| 2 | 13 | October 4, 1991 | December 27, 1991 |

== Episodes ==
The series aired 26 episodes over two seasons in the fall of 1990 and 1991, and then aired in reruns in 1992. It was not renewed for a third season.

=== Season 1 (1990–91) ===
| No. overall | No. in season | Title | Directed by | Written by | Original release date |
|---|---|---|---|---|---|
| 1 | 1 | "The Power of Positive Thinking" | Stefan Scaini | Stephen Foster, Phil Savath | November 5, 1990 |
| 2 | 2 | "Love's Labour" | Paul Shapiro | Leila Basen, Stephen Foster, Phil Savath | November 12, 1990 |
| 3 | 3 | "Can I Get a Witness?" | Stefan Scaini | Stephen Foster, Phil Savath | November 19, 1990 |
| 4 | 4 | "The Beausejour Bonspiel" | Paul Shapiro | Stephen Foster, Charles Lazer, Phil Savath | November 26, 1990 |
| 5 | 5 | "The Nuclear Family" | Stefan Scaini | Stephen Foster, Phil Savath | December 3, 1990 |
| 6 | 6 | "Time Is on Your Side" | Paul Shapiro | Stephen Foster, Phil Savath, Charles Lazer | December 10, 1990 |
| 7 | 7 | "Make Room for Daddy" | Stefan Scaini | Stephen Foster, Phil Savath, Rick Drew | January 6, 1991 |
| 8 | 8 | "The 12 Labours of Maxules" | Stefan Scaini | Stephen Foster, Phil Savath, Charles Lazer | January 14, 1991 |
| 9 | 9 | "Music Hath Charms" | Stuart Bass | Stephen Foster, Phil Savath, Charles Lazer | January 21, 1991 |
| 10 | 10 | "Divine Comedians" | Allan A. Goldstein | Leila Basen, Stephen Foster, Phil Savath | January 28, 1991 |
| 11 | 11 | "Queen for a Day" | Sandy Wilson | Leila Basen, Stephen Foster, Charles Lazer | February 4, 1991 |
| 12 | 12 | "Watch the Skies" | Stefan Scaini | Stephen Foster, Rick Drew | February 11, 1991 |
| 13 | 13 | "Give Me Puberty or Give Me Death" | Stuart Gillard | Stephen Foster | March 4, 1991 |

=== Season 2 (1991) ===
| No. overall | No. in season | Title | Directed by | Written by | Original release date |
|---|---|---|---|---|---|
| 14 | 1 | "The Wife of Bath's Tale" | George Bloomfield | Stephen Foster, Phil Savath, Charles Lazer | October 4, 1991 |
| 15 | 2 | "Future Shock" | Al Waxman | Stephen Foster, Jim Makichuk | October 11, 1991 |
| 16 | 3 | "Career Moves" | Stacey Stewart Curtis | Stephen Foster, Rick Drew | October 18, 1991 |
| 17 | 4 | "Cousin Sophie" | Al Waxman | Stephen Foster, Charles Lazer | October 25, 1991 |
| 18 | 5 | "Odd Couple" | Stephen Surjik | Leila Basen, Stephen Foster | November 1, 1991 |
| 19 | 6 | "Max and Dougie and Stephanie and Max" | Stefan Scaini | Jack Blum, Sharon Corder | November 8, 1991 |
| 20 | 7 | "We Stand on Guard" | Stefan Scaini | David Barlow, Charles Lazer | November 15, 1991 |
| 21 | 8 | "Get an Afterlife" | Patrick Corbett | Stephen Foster | November 22, 1991 |
| 22 | 9 | "Anybody Feel a Draft?" | Rex Bromfield | Stephen Foster | November 29, 1991 |
| 23 | 10 | "Das Winnebago" | Stacey Stewart Curtis | Leila Basen, Stephen Foster | December 6, 1991 |
| 24 | 11 | "Of Mice and Max" | Al Waxman | Stephen Foster, Rick Drew | December 13, 1991 |
| 25 | 12 | "Dear Sarah" | Rex Bromfield | David Barlow | December 20, 1991 |
| 26 | 13 | "This Half-Hour Has 2 1/2 Days" | Stacey Stewart Curtis | David Barlow | December 27, 1991 |

== Awards ==
The series received three Gemini Award nominations at the 6th Gemini Awards in 1992, for Best Guest Performance in a Series (Marilyn Lightstone), Best Costume Design (Karen L. Matthews) and Best Original Music Score for a Series (Graeme Coleman); at the 7th Gemini Awards in 1993, Coleman was again nominated for Best Original Music while David Barlow won the award for Best Writing in a Dramatic Series.
