= Divided Loyalties (film) =

1990 Canadian historical drama television film

- Genre: Drama
- Written by: Peter Jobin
- Directed by: Mario Azzopardi
- Starring: Jack Langedijk; Tantoo Cardinal
- Theme music composer: John Kim Bell
- Country of origin: Canada
- Original language: English

Production
- Producers: Gerry Rochon; Tom Gould
- Cinematography: Vic Sarin
- Editor: Tony Lower
- Running time: 102 minutes
- Production company: History Productions

Original release
- Network: CTV
- Release: February 13, 1990

Divided Loyalties is a Canadian historical drama television film, directed by Mario Azzopardi and broadcast by CTV in 1990. The film stars Jack Langedijk as Mohawk leader Joseph Brant, portraying his "divided loyalties" between British and American allies during the American Revolutionary War, and Tantoo Cardinal as his sister Molly Brant.

The cast also includes Denis Lacroix, Chris Wiggins, Robert Bidaman, John Bourgeois, Jon Granik, Yvan Labelle, Dale Wilson, Lisa LaCroix, Raoul Trujillo, August Schellenberg, Neil Dainard, George Touliatos, Kennetch Charlette, Richard Maracle, Vern Harper and Troy Martin.

The film faced some criticism for casting the non-indigenous Langedijk in the lead, with Cardinal admitting that she had reservations about appearing in the film on that basis, but stating that she decided to accept the role after carefully examining the script and concluding that it represented a sincere effort to respectfully depict the First Nations experience. Azzopardi, however, disowned the film after Baton Broadcasting deemed its original edit not broadcast-worthy, and re-edited it in advance of the broadcast.

The film was broadcast by CTV on February 13, 1990.

== Awards and nominations ==
Award	Year	Category	Nominee(s)	Result	Ref.
Gemini Awards	1990	Best Television Movie	Gerry Rochon, Tom Gould	Nominated	
Gemini Awards	1990	Best Actor in a Leading Role in a Dramatic Program or Mini-Series	Jack Langedijk	Nominated	
Gemini Awards	1990	Best Photography in a Dramatic Program or Series	Vic Sarin	Nominated	
Gemini Awards	1990	Best Sound in a Dramatic Program or Series	David Appleby, Wayne Griffin, David Evans, Paul Massey, Steve Joles	Won	

== See also ==
- List of films about the American Revolution
