= Edwina Follows =

Canadian television writer and producer

Edwina Follows (born April 11, 1961) is a Canadian television writer and producer, most noted for her longtime role as a senior member of the programming team for Discovery Channel Canada.

== Background ==
The daughter of actors Ted Follows and Dawn Greenhalgh, and the older sister of actress Megan Follows, she had a few acting roles early in her career, most notably a three-episode story arc on The Littlest Hobo in 1982 which starred the entire Follows family, and a recurring role on the children's show Read All About It! as The Book Destroyer.

She was one of the writers for the 1st Gemini Awards in 1986.

== Career ==
Her first project as a dramatic screenwriter was the 1988 TVOntario dramatic anthology series Family Matters, directed by her father and featuring her mother in an episode. Later that year, she enrolled in the screenwriting program at the Canadian Film Centre; in 1989, she wrote the screenplay for Exposed, a short film directed by her CFC classmate Gail Harvey.

She subsequently wrote several episodes of the TVO anthology series Saying Goodbye, earning her first Gemini Award nomination as a writer at the 5th Gemini Awards for the episode "Thunder in My Head". For the next number of years she worked as a producer and writer for TVOntario, most notably on the 1993 documentary series Exploring Ontario's Provincial Parks.

Later in the 1990s and 2000s she was a writer for television series such as Ready or Not, Traders, Riverdale, Emily of New Moon, Pit Pony, Braceface, Screech Owls, Beastmaster and Relic Hunter, as well as the television film Dinosaur Hunter.

In 2001 she made a rare return to acting, appearing alongside her family in a stage production of Noël Coward's Hay Fever in Gravenhurst, which later toured to several Southern Ontario cities in 2003. In 2002 her parents starred in a production of her stage play The Players, a historical drama about Canada's first professional summer theatre company.

She began producing documentary programming for channels such as History and Discovery in the 2000s, including the series Masterminds, Forensic Factor and On the Run, and a profile of shark conservationist Craig Ferreira for the 2007 edition of Shark Week.

She became director of commissioning and production for Discovery in 2012. She remained with the channel until 2021, when she left amid a round of staffing cutbacks at Bell Media.

== Awards ==
Award	Year	Category	Work	Result	Ref.
Gemini Awards	1990	Best Writing in a Dramatic Program or Mini-Series	Saying Goodbye: "Thunder in My Head"	Nominated	
Gemini Awards	1998	Best Writing in a Children's or Youth Program or Series	Ready or Not: "Your Own Money"	Nominated	
Gemini Awards	2006	Best General/Human Interest Series	Forensic Factor	Nominated	
Gemini Awards	2007	Best General/Human Interest Series	On the Run	Nominated	
Gemini Awards	2008	Best General/Human Interest Series	Forensic Factor	Nominated	
Gemini Awards	2009	Best Children's or Youth Non-Fiction Program or Series	Sci Q with Andrew Burnstein, Jane Gilbert, Dave Litman	Nominated	
Gemini Awards	2011	Best General/Human Interest Series	Forensic Factor with Sally Karam, Alyse Rosenberg	Nominated	
