= John Kim Bell =

Canadian composer

John Kim Bell OC OOnt (born October 8, 1952) is Canada’s first Indigenous symphony-orchestra conductor, the founder of the country’s precedent-setting National Aboriginal Achievement Foundation (today known as Indspire) and the National Aboriginal Achievement Awards (today known as the Indspire Awards) and one of Canada's leading energy resource consultants representing First Nations. Bell is a decorated Canadian and an internationally recognized leader and activist in the arts, philanthropy and First Nations resource development.

Bell is an Officer of the Order of Canada and a member of the Order of Ontario. He was the national recipient of the Royal Bank Award for Canadian Achievement in 1988, a major Canadian award carrying a cash price of $250,000 and has received three medals from the Queen, among other citations for his ground-breaking work. He was named the 2003 national outstanding cultural leader by the Canadian Conference of the Arts in 2003. In 2005, he served as one of five Canadian advisors to Prince Charles and received a Lifetime Achievement Award from the Royal Conservatory of Music in 2007. The Indigenous community has recognized Bell's contribution to the advancement of Indigenous peoples; he has been honoured with three Eagle feathers throughout his career.

== Family and education ==
=== Early life ===
John Kim Bell was born on the Kahnawake Reserve in Quebec, Canada in 1952. He is the eldest child of Don Eagle and Beth Hamilton, the former a Mohawk wrestler from Canada deemed "the most famous Indian in the world." In the late 1940s, Eagle became the AWA World Heavyweight Champion and, in the 1950s, he starred on The Tonight Show monthly. Bell’s mother, Beth Hamilton Bell, was a model and writer who ran a radio program in the United States. Hoping to meet Don Eagle, she arranged an interview with him; six weeks later, the pair eloped.

Beth Hamilton Bell moved to the Kahnawake Mohawk Reserve to be with Eagle during an era when inter-racial marriage was illegal. After the birth of Bell and his brother, the marriage dissolved and Hamilton Bell took John Kim and his brother to the United States where they lived with Hamilton Bell’s parents in Columbus, Ohio. Bell and his brother returned to the Kahnawake Reserve in the summers of their youth but faced equal alienation there as they did in Columbus.

Bell began playing the piano at age eight and later studied violin and saxophone. Talented from an early age, he was playing the piano on local television talent shows at age ten and winning state piano competitions. As a teen he was hired by John Kenley to play piano for the Kenley Players summer theatre company which led to his appointment as associate conductor of the international company A Chorus Line. By the age of 18 Bell was conducting numerous Broadway, ballet and operatic productions, which included headliners Gene Kelly and Lauren Bacall.

=== Education and early career ===
Bell attended Ohio State University from which he received a Bachelor of Music in 1976. He went on to attend the Academia Musica Chigiana in Sienna, Italy and later apprenticed with Zubin Mehta at the New York Philharmonic. After studying in Italy, Bell went to New York and conducted for the Harlem Dance Theatre, Eglevsky Ballet, and many Broadway shows and operatic productions.

== Career ==
=== Composer and conductor ===
In 1980, Bell was touring in Toronto, Ontario, Canada with the international company of A Chorus Line. The pit musicians, predominantly from the Toronto Symphony Orchestra, were so taken with Bell that they suggested to then-Music Director of the TSO Andrew Davis to take Bell on as an apprentice. Shortly after auditioning for Davis, Bell was appointed Apprentice Conductor of the Toronto Symphony Orchestra.

In 1984, the CBC created a documentary on Bell’s musical career titled "John Kim Bell: The First North American Indian Conductor." The release of this documentary caused innumerable Indigenous artists to contact him for support in achieving success. Bell also began to receive speaking invitations from Indigenous communities and political groups as well as solicitations for charitable donations. Having researched and not found any existing Indigenous arts programs, Bell was inspired to establish the Canadian Native Arts Foundation (CNAF) to educate and promote Indigenous artists. His first concert fundraiser took place in 1987 and included the Toronto Symphony Orchestra, Don Ross, the then-unknown Shania Twain, and Bernadette Peters.

John Kim Bell produced, directed, co-composed, and conducted In the Land of the Spirits, the first all-Indigenous ballet to tour nationally. The ballet premiered at the National Arts Centre in 1992 and enjoyed an immensely successful run.

Bell composed music for Divided Loyalties, The Trial of Standing Bear, No Turning Back, and Time Immemorial, as well as for many of the National Aboriginal Achievement Awards shows that he executive produced and directed. In 1985 he conducted the orchestra of the National Ballet of Canada and in 1987, the Royal Philharmonic Orchestra in London.

=== Philanthropist ===
As an Indigenous man living in the bourgeois world of symphony music, Bell experienced a sort of identity crisis. He recognized that as a powerful Indigenous role model, he could contribute to - and inspire- substantial social change for his peoples.

In 1985, Bell founded the National Aboriginal Achievement Foundation. In 1993, to mark the United Nations’ International Decade of the World’s Indigenous People, Bell mounted the National Aboriginal Achievement Awards, celebrating the success of Indigenous leaders in Canada. Under Bell's leadership the National Aboriginal Achievement Awards were once the largest cultural event in Canada. Bell served as the President for the NAAF for twenty years, aiding it to become the largest charity for Indigenous peoples. He has been credited with accruing the greatest amount of corporate support for an Indigenous cause within Canada. Over two decades, Bell raised approximately $80 million for the NAAA and NAAF. The NAAF is now known as Indspire, while the NAAA has been renamed to the Indspire Awards.

In 2008, Bell proposed the idea of a $250 million First Nations Loan Guarantee Program in Ontario, which the provincial government implemented in 2010.

Bell is a member of the Canadian charity Artists Against Racism.

=== Consultancy ===
From 1988 to 2005 Bell was president of management company Ariontha Inc. In 2006 he founded Bell & Bernard Limited. In 2009 he helped established the Enbridge School Plus Program, which supports extracurricular activities and enrichment programming in First Nations schools. Today, Mr. Bell is one of Canada's leading Indigenous energy resource consultants representing First Nations and the President & CEO of Bell & Bernard Limited.

== Board appointments ==
Bell has been a member of several boards including at the Canadian Broadcasting Corporation (CBC), the Canada Millennium Scholarship Foundation, and the Aboriginal Human Resource Development Council of Canada. He has also sat on the boards of the Canadian Institute for Health Research, the Federal Task Force on Professional Training in the Cultural Sector, and the City of Toronto's 2008 Olympic bid. Bell is currently a patron and Arts Jury Chair of Indigenous Arts & Stories, formerly the Canadian Aboriginal Writing and Arts Challenge, a writing and visual arts competition for Indigenous youth.

== Awards and honours ==
- Member of the Order of Canada (1990) and was appointed an Officer of the Order of Canada in 1997. In 2003 he was made a Member of the Order of Ontario.
- Royal Bank Award for Canadian Achievement in 1998.
- Canadian Conference of the Arts Keith Kelly Award for Cultural Leadership in 2002.
- Outstanding National Cultural Leader 2003 by the Canadian Conference of the Arts.
- Aboriginal Peoples Choice Music Awards’ Lifetime Achievement Award in 2010.

Bell has also received two Gemini Awards (Gold and Bronze) from the International Broadcast Designers’ Association for the Cavern and Glass Pyramid sets he designed for the National Aboriginal Achievement Awards.

== Honorary degrees ==
Bell has received six honorary degrees from post-secondary institutions across Canada.

- Lakehead University in Thunder Bay, Ontario (D.MUS.) in 1990.
- Trent University in Peterborough, Ontario (LL.D.) in 1992.
- Mount Allison University in Sackville, New Brunswick (LL.D.) in 1994.
- University of Alberta in Edmonton, Alberta (LL.D.) in 1999.
- University of Toronto in Toronto, Ontario (LL.D.) in 1999.
- Wilfrid Laurier University in Kitchener, Ontario (LL.D.) in 2008.
