= Noise (2005 film) =

2005 Canadian short film

- Directed by: Greg Spottiswood
- Written by: Greg Spottiswood
- Produced by: Jason Charters; Liam Romalis; Greg Spottiswood
- Starring: Hugh Thompson; Cameron Lewis
- Cinematography: Brian Harper
- Edited by: Ben Wilkinson
- Music by: Kurt Swinghammer
- Production company: Riddle Films
- Release date: March 3, 2005 (NSI)
- Running time: 17 minutes
- Country: Canada
- Language: English

Noise is a Canadian short drama film, directed by Greg Spottiswood and released in 2005. The film depicts a battle of wills between a boy (Cameron Lewis) who has locked himself in the family car, and his father (Hugh Thompson) who is trying to get him to come back out.

The film premiered at the NSI Film Exchange Canadian Film Festival on March 3, 2005. It was subsequently screened at the 2005 Toronto International Film Festival.

== Awards ==
Award	Date of ceremony	Category	Recipient(s)	Result	Ref(s)
Atlantic Film Festival	2005	Best Canadian Short Film	Greg Spottiswood	Won	
CFC Worldwide Short Film Festival	2006	Bravo!FACT Award for Best Canadian Short	Greg Spottiswood	Won	
Genie Awards	2006	Best Live Action Short Drama	Greg Spottiswood, Jason Charters, Liam Romalis	Nominated	
Whistler Film Festival	2005	Best Short Film	Greg Spottiswood	Won	
