= Conspiracy of Silence (1991 film) =

1991 Canadian television drama miniseries

- Genre: Drama
- Written by: Suzette Couture; Lisa Priest
- Directed by: Francis Mankiewicz
- Starring: Michael Mahonen; Michelle St. John; Stephen Ouimette; Brooke Johnson
- Composer: Yves Laferrière
- Country of origin: Canada
- Original languages: English; French
- No. of episodes: 2

Production
- Producers: Gail Carr; Bernard Zukerman
- Cinematography: Glen MacPherson
- Editor: Ralph Brunjes
- Running time: 4 hours
- Production company: CBC

Original release
- Network: CBC
- Release: December 1 – December 2, 1991

Conspiracy of Silence is a 1991 Canadian television film, presented in a two-episode miniseries, based on the true story of the murder of Helen Betty Osborne, a Canadian cold case that was solved after sixteen years of inaction. The film was aired in 1991 by the Canadian Broadcasting Corporation, but was never released on VHS or DVD. Michael Mahonen, one of the primary cast stars from the film, later released it for free to his own channel on YouTube, which is the only public copy available not privately stored in CBC's archives. Actress Michelle St. John, better known for her voice role as Nakoma in the Disney Pocahontas franchise, played the role of Osborne. It was awarded Best Dramatic Miniseries at the 7th Gemini Awards, among seven total wins.

== Background ==
Conspiracy of Silence emerged as a project after the release of writer Lisa Priest's award-winning book by the same title, which had been released in 1990, covering the case of Helen Betty Osborne extensively. Like the book, the film approached the story from a relatively novel angle for its time, exploring the underlying xenophobia and racial prejudice that fuelled the attitude surrounding the case. Nineteen-year-old Helen Betty Osborne was a Canadian Cree student raped and murdered by a group of boys in The Pas, Manitoba, in 1971 while boarding at a local home to study at an English public school. The case was highly contentious and took almost two decades before a full investigation and legal resolution arose, although early attempts to investigate the murder had occurred before then, with little information coming forward.

== Plot ==
=== Part 1 ===
On a cold November night in 1971, local ice hockey jocks Dwayne Archie Johnston, James Robert Paul Houghton, Lee Scott Colgan and Norman Bernard Manger get drunk, swear loudly and drive around looking for women to pick up. While driving, they spot local Cree student Helen Betty Osborne bundled in a winter coat as she walks home along the road. They force her into their car, groping her while she screams. The next morning, a young boy and his father, ice-fishing near a pump house, find the woman's fully-nude body abandoned in the snow, covered in multiple stab wounds and bruises. The Royal Canadian Mounted Police begin investigating the case; meanwhile, Lee Colgan's life begins to slowly go downhill due to his own guilt and mental instability.

The police, like the townsfolk of The Pas, are largely indifferent to the case, making racist remarks about Helen Betty and believing that Indigenous women are all sluts and that Helen Betty was probably picked up as a sort of prostitute. To the disgust of Angie, a local waitress at the town's most popular diner, a department store owner openly tells the joke, "did you hear about the new Indian wine (play on the homophone "whine"))? (in a babyish voice) I want my land back!". The four boys who murdered Helen Betty are all white, and therefore not initially suspected. The police haul in Helen Betty's boyfriend, a local Cree boy named Cornelius, and terrify him so badly with a photograph of Helen Betty's mutilated corpse that he faints during the interrogation. One policeman, Constable Mike Hall, is bothered by the racist attitudes towards Helen Betty. Being a white man himself, he knows little of Cree culture or Helen Betty's inner world, but discovers her schoolbooks and a collection of vinyl records and family photographs she collected in her bedroom. He listens to the last vinyl record she had purchased, a single of "Me and You and a Dog Named Boo", and finds only innocent, harmless artifacts in the room, not any sexual paraphernalia. Constable Hall is then made to go up to Helen Betty's home in Norway House to inform her family of her death. Helen Betty's mother does not speak English, but feigns that she does, while Helen Betty's little sister later translates the bad news in Cree after Constable Hall is gone, causing their mother to break down sobbing and screaming in grief.

As time goes on, less and less is known about the case. Newspaper offers of monetary rewards, as well as a hypnotism attempt on the truck driver who had been behind Lee Colgan's car on the night of the murder, do eventually link Colgan's license plate number to the murder vehicle. The car turns out to be Colgan's father's car; Lee had borrowed it that night. He is subsequently arrested and the car impounded, where a bra clasp is discovered that belonged to Helen Betty. It is revealed that Colgan has been vocal about his involvement in the murder, owing to his increasing mental health issues, and that his eccentric parents both suspect his involvement themselves, as well as his boss at a local department store, though none of them step up to testify. The four boys are given a lawyer known for his own corruption who quickly gets them all released from prison, leaving Helen Betty's case to go cold.

=== Part 2 ===
Over a decade later, Constable Steve Frishbilski travels to The Pas to reopen the case. He is initially ignored and an antisemitic remark is made about his name (he is called "Constable Frisbee"). The former high school students who had been classmates of Helen Betty's have long-since graduated, although the atmosphere in town is still haunted by the murder. Angie, who is part-Cree but pretends to be completely white, feels increasingly unsafe around the four boys who murdered Helen Betty, one of whom pretends to stab her in the stomach as a joke, and chases an Indigenous man with his car until he runs him off the road, causing the man to drop his groceries. Frishbilski interviews Marie, a white girl and one of Helen Betty's former classmates. She admits that in all her time at school, she never once thought to ask Helen Betty or any of the other Indigenous students to come over to her house or be friends, something that she regrets in adulthood. She also reveals that Lee Colgan, in a drunken stupor during a makeout attempt in a car with her, had once admitted to the murder, frightening her. At the time, she had thought he was just seeking attention.

The case is brought into court. All four boys involved in the murder have since grown up, with one of them having moved to another province, starting his own family after getting married. Colgan himself lives with his increasingly aged, senile parents in his old childhood bedroom, unable to secure employment and having no hobbies or social interests. Helen Betty's aged mother and now adult little sister travel from their reservation to the courthouse to observe the outcome of the case. Helen Betty's mother has since learned some English, and listens in on the trial, hoping to see the boys convicted. Two out of four boys are convicted, while a flashback shows Helen Betty's family on the reserve saying farewell to her as they let her go to school in The Pas. Her mother, who told her to be careful and to enjoy herself, is still unable to move on from the loss, while Constable Frishbilski feels guilty that he was unable to get enough to convict all four boys. It is revealed that Helen Betty was gang-raped, beaten, internally-injured and stabbed over fifty times with a screwdriver tool, cracking her skull, ripping one of her kidneys apart and damaging her lungs severely before she died, after which she was dumped at the pump house.

== Cast ==
- Michael Mahonen as Lee Colgan
- Michelle St. John as Helen Betty Osborne
- Carl Marotte as Constable Mike Hall
- Stephen Ouimette as Constable Steve Frishbilski
- Paula Barrett as CBC Reporter
- Brooke Johnson as Angie
- James B. Douglas as Harold "Bud" Colgan
- Ian Tracey as Dwayne Johnston
- Jonathan Potts as Jim Houghton
- Diego Chambers as Norm Manger
- Dawn Greenhalgh as Joyce Colgan

== Reception ==
The film received an audience of 34 million views in the US across two nights. In Canada it attracted 2 million viewers across December 1 to 2, 1991.
