= The First Circle (1992 film) =

1992 Canadian-French television drama film

- Genre: Thriller
- Based on: In the First Circle by Aleksandr Solzhenitsyn
- Screenplay by: M. Charles Cohen
- Directed by: Sheldon Larry
- Starring: Victor Garber; Christopher Plummer; F. Murray Abraham; Robert Powell
- Music by: Gabriel Yared
- Countries of origin: Canada; France
- Original language: English

Production
- Producer: Claude Héroux
- Production locations: Montreal; Moscow; Paris
- Cinematography: Ron Orieux
- Editor: Debra Karen
- Running time: 180 minutes

Original release
- Release: 1992

The First Circle is a 1992 Canadian-French made-for-television drama film directed by Sheldon Larry, starring Victor Garber, Christopher Plummer, F. Murray Abraham and Robert Powell. It is an adaptation of the novel In the First Circle by Aleksandr Solzhenitsyn.

At the 1992 Gemini Awards, the film was awarded the prize for Best Photography in a Dramatic Program or Series. It was also nominated for Best Dramatic Mini-Series, Best Writing, Best Performance by an Actor, and Best Performance by an Actress in a Leading Role in a Dramatic Program or Mini-Series.

== Cast ==
- Robert Powell as Gleb Nerzhin
- Victor Garber as Lev Rubin
- Christopher Plummer as Viktor Abakumov
- F. Murray Abraham as Joseph Stalin
- Corinne Touzet as Nadya Nerzhina
- Dominic Raacke as Nikolai Shagov
- Günther Maria Halmer as Vladimir Chelnov
- David Hewlett as Rostislav
- Raf Vallone as Pyotr Makarygin
- Vernon Dobtcheff as Ryumin
