= 33 Brompton Place =

American television series

33 Brompton Place (1982) is a five-part miniseries that was broadcast on Showtime Networks in the United States and Global in Canada. It was filmed in Winnipeg, Manitoba.
