= Corinne Touzet =

French actress and producer (born 1959)

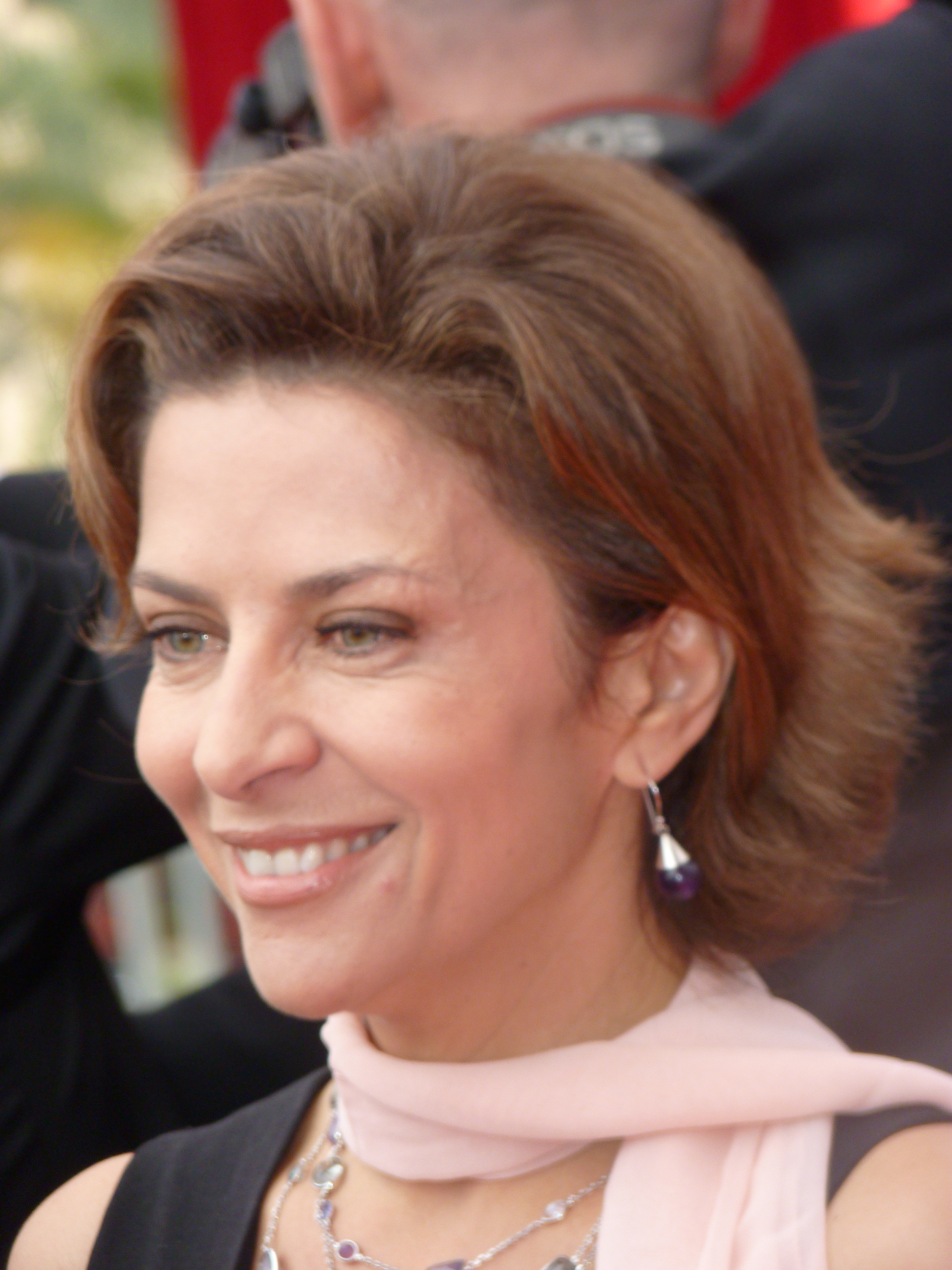
- Corinne Touzet at the 2012 Monte-Carlo Television Festival
- Born: 21 December 1959 (age 66); Orthez, Pyrénées-Atlantiques, France
- Occupations: Actress, Producer
- Years active: 1982–present
- Known for: Une femme d'honneur

Corinne Touzet (born 21 December 1959) is a French actress and producer. She is best known for her starring role as Isabelle Florent in the French police drama series Une femme d'honneur which ran from 1996–2008.

== Personal life ==
She gave birth to her only daughter in 1994.

== Theater ==
Year	Title	Author	Director	Notes
1994	Le misanthrope	Yves-André Hubert	Roger Hanin	
2008	Mobile home	Sylvain Rougerie	Anne Bourgeois	
2010	Personne n'est parfait	Simon Williams	Alain Sachs	Théâtre des Variétés
2011-12	Soif	Fred Nony	Marion Sarraut	Théâtre de la Porte Saint-Martin
2013	Une journée particulière	Ettore Scola & Ruggero Maccari	Christophe Lidon	Théâtre du Chêne Noir
2015	Un nouveau départ	Antoine Rault	Christophe Lidon (2)	Festival d'Avignon

== Filmography ==
=== Film ===
Corinne Touzet film credits
Year	Title	Role	Director	Notes
1982	Tir groupé		Jean-Claude Missiaen	
1983	S.A.S. à San Salvador	Elena	Raoul Coutard	
1983	Ça va pas être triste	Marthe Mahler	Pierre Sisser	
1984	Viva la vie	Catherine's Friend	Claude Lelouch	
1985	Le cowboy	France	Georges Lautner	
1985	L'amour propre ne le reste jamais très longtemps	Anne-Sophie	Martin Veyron	
1985	Ne pas déranger	The Women	Philippe Dorison	Short
1985	Prochainement sur cet écran	The Women	Philippe Dorison	Short
1987	La rumba	Regina Berluzzi	Roger Hanin	
1988	The Witches' Sabbath	Cristina	Marco Bellocchio	
1988	Prisonnières	Sabine	Charlotte Silvera	
1991	Génération oxygène	France Malatray	Georges Trillat	
1991	La dernière tentation de Chris	The Woman	Patrick Malakian	Short
1996	L'Homme qui Marche	Heléne	Roland Moreau	

=== Television ===
Corinne Touzet television credits
Year	Title	Role	Director	Notes
1983	Marianne, une étoile pour Napoléon	Marianne	Marion Sarraut	1 episode
1984	Le château		Jean Kerchbron	TV movie
1985	Les amours des années 50	Agnès	Jean-Paul Carrère	1 episode
1985	Hôtel de police	Muriel Pajols	Jean-Pierre Prévost & Claude Barrois	6 episodes
1986	La force du destin		Maurice Frydland	TV Short
1986	Liberty	Jeanne Baheau	Richard C. Sarafian	TV movie
1987	Bonjour maître		Denys de La Patellière	TV miniseries
1987	Marie Pervenche	Brigitte Cochet	Claude Boissol	1 episode
1988	Crash	Florence Jansen	Tom Toelle	TV movie
1988	La chaîne	Ghislaine Tabet	Claude Faraldo	TV miniseries
1989	Le retour de Lemmy Caution	Séverine	Josée Dayan	TV movie
1989	Bordertown	Lilly	George Erschbamer	1 episode
1990	Counterstrike	Veronique	Paolo Barzman	Episode: "Escape Route"
1990	Navarro	Annick Le Guennec	Patrick Jamain	1 episode
1990	Le Lyonnais	Irène Devic	Michel Favart	1 episode
1991	Tango Bar	Marie-Hélène Lessault	Philippe Setbon	TV movie
1991	Red Fox	Justine	Ian Toynton	TV miniseries
1991	Les hordes	Elaine Finder	Jean-Claude Missiaen (2)	TV miniseries
1991	La moglie nella cornice	Jo	Philippe Monnier	TV miniseries
1992	The First Circle	Nadia Nerzhin	Sheldon Larry	TV movie Nominated - Gemini Award - Best Performance by an Actress in a Leading Role in a Dramatic Program or Mini-Series
1992	Jewels	Emanuelle	Roger Young	TV miniseries
1993	Der Betrogene	Sylvie Morac	Heinz Schirk	TV movie
1994	Charlemagne, le prince à cheval	Irène	Clive Donner	TV miniseries
1995	Samson le magnifique	Sandra	Étienne Périer	TV movie
1995	Passion mortelle	Florence Sartey	Claude-Michel Rome	TV movie
1995	Lulu roi de France	The Marquise	Bernard Uzan	TV movie
1995	Maria fille de Flandre	Jeanne	Philippe Triboit	TV movie
1995	Le retour d'Arsène Lupin	Patricia	Philippe Condroyer	1 episode
1996	Le bébé d'Elsa	Maryse	Michaël Perrotta	TV movie
1996-2008	Une femme d'honneur	Isabelle Florent	Several	37 episodes 7 d'Or - Best Actress - Movie Made for TV
1997	Rideau de feu	Muriel	Igaal Niddam	TV movie
1997	Profession infirmière	Doctor Marol	Williams Crépin	1 episode
1998	D'or et de safran	Alex	Marco Pico	TV movie
1998	Une leçon d'amour	Sylvie	Alain Tasma	TV movie
1999	La traversée du phare	Corinne	Thierry Redler	TV movie
2001	Les inséparables	Corinne	Thierry Redler (2)	TV movie
2002	La vie au grand air	Juliette Lacombe	François Luciani	TV movie
2002	Et demain, Paula ?	Paula	Michaël Perrotta (2)	TV movie
2003	Valentine	Valentine	Eric Summer	TV movie
2003	Miss Europe 2003	Herself	Several	Beauty Pageant; Part of the Judging Panel
2004	Un parfum de Caraïbes	Agnès Merline	Michaël Perrotta (3)	TV movie
2005	L'homme qui voulait passer à la télé	Herself	Amar Arhab & Fabrice Michelin	TV movie
2005	L'enfant de personne	Laura Delorme	Michaël Perrotta (4)	TV movie
2006	Maldonne	Sandrine Petit	Patrice Martineau	TV movie
2006	Les secrets du volcan	Geneviève Bertin	Michaëla Watteaux	TV miniseries
2007	Valentine & Cie	Valentine Clément	Patrice Martineau (2)	TV movie
2008	Une maman pour un coeur	Esther Weil	Patrice Martineau (3)	TV movie
2010-11	Interpol	Louise Verneuil	Several	7 episodes
2012	Un crime oublié	Marylou	Patrick Volson	TV movie
2014	La malédiction de Julia	Julia	Bruno Garcia	TV movie
2014	Un si joli mensonge	Christine	Alain Schwartzstein	TV movie
