= Greg Spottiswood =

Canadian actor and television producer

Greg Spottiswood is a Canadian actor and television producer. He is most noted for his leading performance in the 1989 television film Looking for Miracles, for which he won the Daytime Emmy Award for Outstanding Performer in a Children's Special, and received a Gemini Award nomination for Best Performance by an Actor in a Leading Role in a Dramatic Program or Mini-Series at the 5th Gemini Awards, in 1990.

== Acting career ==
Originally from Mississauga, Ontario, he studied acting at the National Theatre School of Canada.

He began his career as a stage actor, with his early roles including productions of Raymond Storey's Girls in the Gang, Laurie Fyffe's Bush Fire, Peter Anderson's Rattle in the Dash, George F. Walker's Nothing Sacred, and Brad Fraser's Unidentified Human Remains and the True Nature of Love.

Spottiswood and Zachary Bennett were cast together in Looking for Miracles after producer Kevin Sullivan noticed their camaraderie when he saw them horsing around together in the waiting room at the auditions. Although he was already 25 years old, he noted that his youthful appearance, which enabled him to credibly play a teenager, opened up acting opportunities for him where he wouldn't have to compete against more established actors in his age range like Michael Riley, Ted Dykstra or Maurice Godin.

Following Looking for Miracles he made guest appearances in film and television, but continued to be more prominent as a stage actor, including in Storey's The Saints and Apostles, Walker's Escape from Happiness and Theatre of the Film Noir, Dorothy L. Sayers's Busman's Honeymoon, and Wendy Lill's All Fall Down.

He also began directing stage plays in this era, beginning with a 1991 production of Sean Dixon's End of the World Romance.

== Writing and production ==
In the late 1990s, he began working more in film and television writing and production, making his directorial and screenwriting debut with the 2000 short film Learning to Swim. He followed up in 2005 with the short film Noise, which was a Genie Award nominee for Best Live Action Short Drama at the 26th Genie Awards in 2006.

He made a return to the stage, for the first time in six years, in a 2004 production of Kevin Kerr's Unity (1918).

He was a writer for the television series The Zack Files, Shattered, Endgame, King, Remedy and Frontier. In 2009, he won a WGC Screenwriting Award in the Radio category for an episode of the CBC Radio drama series Afghanada.

Beginning in 2019 he was the creator and showrunner of the American drama series All Rise, but was fired from the show in 2021 following unsubstantiated anonymous allegations of misconduct in his leadership of the show's writing room, involving racially and sexually offensive comments. A review and internal investigation resulted in no charges.
