= My Grandparents Had a Hotel =

- Directed by: Karen Shopsowitz
- Release date: 1991
- Running time: 30 min.
- Country: Canada
- Language: English

My Grandparents Had a Hotel is a 1991 documentary film by Karen Shopsowitz that features the Montieth Inn, a popular Jewish resort operated in the Canadian Catskills from 1935 to 1949. Although it is in Canada, the inn is similar to Grossinger's and the Concord Hotel in the Catskills of New York, which were similarly popular in the mid-20th century.

The film included 16mm home video footage, interviews with people who once worked and vacationed at the family-run inn, and the filmmaker's father's own memories of the family's prized hotel. The film tells the history of how the phenomenon came to be, how it flourished, and, finally, why it declined.

The documentary shows the time period through numerous vacationers' anecdotes. For example, one old man laughs at his young self, recalling the time he and his teenage friends once stirred up trouble by showing up to a formal dining hall wearing dress shirts, ties, and suit jackets — but no pants.

== History of Jewish Resorts in North America ==
In the 1930s, restrictions against Jews were common in the North American hotel industry. When someone with a Jewish-sounding last name called to make a reservation, hotels would often lie and say they had no vacancies.

Historically, Jews in North America faced social discrimination. To make it easier for Jews looking for hotels, resorts, or inns to stay at, a Canadian-Jewish couple sold their deli and bought a 150-room hotel on Lake Rosseau in Muskoka, just north of Toronto. The Monteith Inn quickly became a popular vacation spot for the Jewish community.

Eventually, the government put an end to the antisemitic practices that made Jewish resorts necessary. Social reform and a terrible natural disaster spurred the decline of the Monteith Inn, but it and other hotels like it have left their traces in old family videos and memories.

== Awards ==
My Grandparents had a Hotel's original musical score won a Gemini award. Shopsowitz won a Peabody Award for another documentary based on her father's home movie footage, the 2000 National Film Board of Canada production My Father's Camera.
