= Looking for Miracles =

- DVD cover
- Based on: Looking for Miracles by A.E. Hotchner
- Screenplay by: Kevin Sullivan; Stuart McLean
- Directed by: Kevin Sullivan
- Starring: Greg Spottiswood; Zachary Bennett
- Theme music composer: John Welsman
- Country of origin: Canada
- Original language: English

Production
- Producers: Trudy Grant; David A. Shepherd; Kevin Sullivan
- Running time: 103 minutes (approx.)
- Production company: Sullivan Entertainment

Original release
- Release: June 3, 1989

Looking for Miracles is a 1989 made-for-TV film based on the memoir of the same name by A.E. Hotchner. Filmed primarily in southern Ontario, it is a story of growing up and relationships, focusing on the experience of two brothers at a summer camp during the Great Depression. The director, producer, and co-writer is Kevin Sullivan.

== Synopsis ==
Set in the summer of 1935, 16-year-old Ryan Delaney (Greg Spottiswood) wants to go to university on a scholarship, but his struggling mother (Patricia Phillips) wants him to stay home, find work, and take care of his 10-year-old brother Sullivan (Zachary Bennett). Due to circumstances relating to the Depression, the brothers were separated and have recently reunited. Ryan is easily annoyed by his little brother. Desperate to find a job, Ryan manages to gain a position as a counselor at Camp Hochelaga despite the fact that he is not qualified; he is too young, has never been to camp, and cannot swim, none of which he reveals during his interview with the camp director, Chief Berman (Joe Flaherty). The ruse is so effective that Ryan is offered the lead counselor position for the group of age 10 boys. After his mother tells him that he cannot go to camp without Sullivan, Ryan convinces Chief Berman to allow the young boy to attend. Being age 10, Sullivan is assigned to Ryan's group.

At the start of camp, Ryan struggles in his position. When he is asked to move a vehicle on the first day, he does not reveal that he cannot drive and ends up having a minor accident. A counselor in Ryan's group named Mo (Hugh Thompson) quickly becomes suspicious of him and comes to realize that he is not qualified. However, he keeps Ryan's secret and the two become good friends. They work together to manage their group of campers, which includes a troubled brat who goes by the nickname of Ratface (Noah Godfrey). Ratface initially is a constant behavior problem for the counselors and is mean to Sullivan. Eventually, though, they come to understand Ratface's troubled home life and the two boys become friends.

The film is a story of growing up. By the end, Ryan and Sullivan develop a close relationship.

== Cast ==
- Greg Spottiswood as Ryan Delaney
- Zachary Bennett as Sullivan Delaney
- Joe Flaherty as Chief Berman
- Patricia Gage as Grace Gibson
- Patricia Phillips as Mrs. Delaney
- Noah Godfrey as Ratface
- Paul Haddad as Paul
- Dean Hamilton as Babe
- Hugh Thompson as Mo
- Eric Fink as Floyd

== Awards ==
- 1989 - ACE Award for Best Art Direction
- 1989 - ACE Award for Best Costume Design
- 1989 - ACE Award for Best Movie
- 1989 - Chris Award for Art & Culture - Columbus International Film & Video Festival
- 1989 - Giffoni Award - Giffoni Film Festival
- 1989 - Ollie Award for Best Outstanding Family Programming - American Children's Television Festival
- 1989 - Silver Hugo Award for Feature Films Made for TV - Chicago International Film Festival
- 1989 - Silver Medal for Teen Special Category - New York Film Festival
- 1990 - Bronze Award for Feature Made for Television - The Houston International Film Festival
- 1990 - Daytime Emmy Award for Outstanding Performer in Children's Programming (Greg Spottiswood)
- 1990 - Daytime Emmy Award nomination for Outstanding Performer in Children's Programming (Zachary Bennett)
- 1990 - Gemini Award for Best Supporting Actor (Joe Flaherty)
- 1990 - Gold Apple Award - National Educational Film & Video Festival
- 1990 - International Monitor Award for Best Director (Kevin Sullivan)
- 1991 - Best Children's Film – Canadian Film Celebration, Calgary
- 1991 - European Jury Prize for Best Screenplay - Umbriafiction TV Festival, Italy
