= John Scully (journalist) =

Canadian journalist

John Scully (born 1941) is a Canadian writer, producer and journalist.

== Biography ==
Scully was born in Westport, New Zealand. He never went to university but began filing photographs at the Wellington Evening Post. He then moved into television reporting and production at the New Zealand Broadcasting Corporation.

From 1965 to 1974, he worked as a senior editor, producer, and writer at BBC TV in London. He started as a summer-relief writer in the TV newsroom but soon rose to the position of duty editor. In 1974, Scully was recruited as the senior field producer for Canada's newest TV network, Global. He remained in Canada to work for CBC.

Subsequently, he was successively: Documentary Producer, W5; News Producer, CTV News; Documentary Producer for CBC Newsmagazine, and The Journal; Executive Producer at CloseUp, TVNZ; Senior Field Producer, The Journal, CBC; and finally Head of Current Affairs, Television New Zealand.

From 1990 to 1994, he held numerous positions with a number of news organizations such as The 5th Estate and CBC South Asia Bureau.

From 2003 to 2007, he was Senior Producer, 360 Vision, Vision TV.

In his career, he has won numerous international awards for news and documentaries.

Scully is the author of Am I Dead Yet: A Journalist's Perspective on Terror in which he traces his journey from Vietnam to Baghdad and explores his thoughts and perspectives on terrorism, its roots and its reasons.

Scully is married and lives in Toronto, Ontario.

In 2022, Scully expressed his intent to seek assisted suicide services through MAiD after suffering from PTSD after his years of reporting in war-torn countries.

== Journalism awards ==
Scully has won numerous journalism awards, such as "Gemini Nomination: Best Documentary" and "Gold Medal, Houston International Film Festival: Best Coverage of a Continuing News Story."
