= Shirley Solomon =

Canadian television talk show host

- Born: 1946 (age 79–80)
- Occupation: Talk show host
- Known for: The Shirley Show (1989-1995)
- Spouse: Les Kottler
- Children: 1

Shirley Solomon (born c. 1946) is a Canadian television talk show host.

== Career ==
She hosted The Shirley Show, a daily afternoon talk show on CTV from September 1989 – 1995. Later in its run, it was syndicated to several major-market American television stations, a historic development for a Canadian talk show.

Solomon previously hosted a talk show on The Life Channel, a short-lived Canadian pay television service.
