= Slawko Klymkiw =

Canadian philanthropist

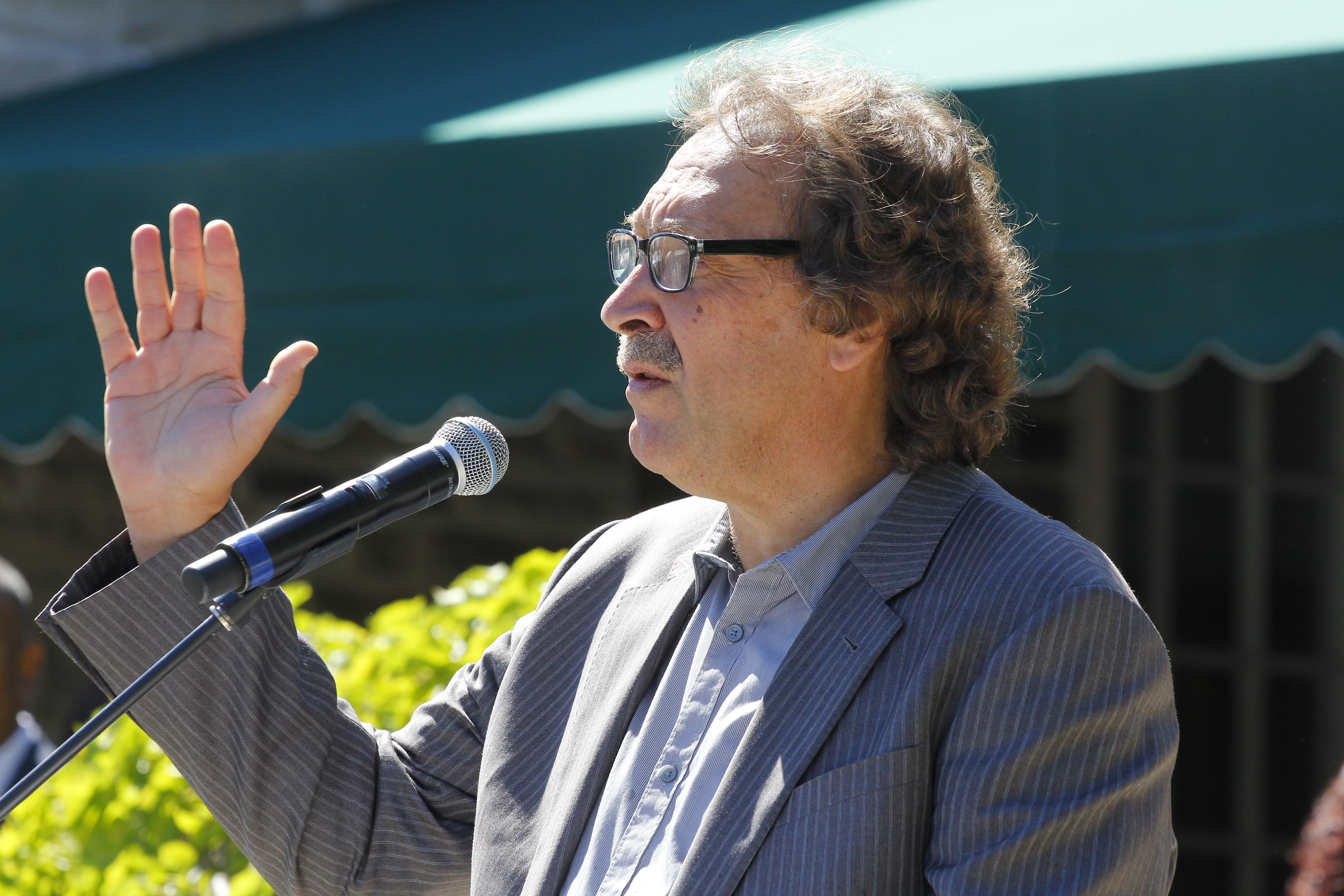

Slawko Klymkiw is a Canadian philanthropist who has been the long-running CEO of the Canadian Film Centre. He was an executive at the Canadian Broadcasting Corporation, in 2005, when he became CED of the CFC.

Klymkiw joined the CBC in 1980, rising to assume the executive directorship of network programming in 1996.

Ke imkiw is also an ex-officio member of the Toronto International Film Festival's Board of Directors.
