= Michael Boland (cinematographer) =

Canadian ice hockey player (1949–2025)

Mike Boland
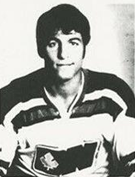
- Born: December 16, 1949 Montreal, Quebec, Canada
- Died: October 5, 2025 (aged 75) Toronto, Ontario, Canada
- Height: 5 ft 10 in (178 cm)
- Weight: 183 lb (83 kg; 13 st 1 lb)
- Position: Right wing
- Shot: Right
- Played for: Ottawa Nationals (WHA); Philadelphia Flyers
- NHL draft: Undrafted
- Playing career: 1970–1978

Michael Anthony Boland (December 16, 1949 – October 5, 2025) was a Canadian cinematographer and professional ice hockey player. He played two NHL games with the Philadelphia Flyers during the 1974–75 season and also played 41 WHA games with the Ottawa Nationals, before beginning to work as a television and documentary film camera operator.

His noted credits include the 1987 hockey documentary film The Boys on the Bus.

Boland won a Primetime Emmy Award (shared with Vic Sarin) for his work on the 1992 episode "Strange Relations" of the television series Millennium: Tribal Wisdom and the Modern World. He and Sarin also won a Gemini Award for Best Photography in an Information/Documentary Program or Series for the same episode.

In 2012 he published his memoir, Through the Lens of My Eye: Adventures of a Documentary Cameraman.

He was codirector with Roberto Verdecchia of "Gorilla Doctors", a 2014 episode of The Nature of Things which was a Canadian Screen Award nominee for Science or Nature Documentary Program or Series at the 4th Canadian Screen Awards.

Boland died on October 5, 2025, at the age of 75.

== Career statistics ==
=== Regular season and playoffs ===
			Regular season					Playoffs
Season	Team	League	GP	G	A	Pts	PIM	GP	G	A	Pts	PIM
1967–68	University of Toronto	CIAU	—	—	—	—	—	—	—	—	—	—
1968–69	University of Toronto	CIAU	10	5	5	10	4	—	—	—	—	—
1969–70	University of Toronto	CIAU	10	3	13	16	22	—	—	—	—	—
1970–71	University of Toronto	CIAU	1	1	0	1	0	—	—	—	—	—
1970–71	Springfield Kings	AHL	34	7	5	12	33	12	2	6	8	4
1971–72	Springfield Kings	AHL	48	4	20	24	47	5	1	0	1	2
1972–73	Ottawa Nationals	WHA	41	1	15	16	44	1	0	0	0	12
1973–74	Richmond Robins	AHL	38	10	19	29	49	5	3	1	4	8
1974–75	Philadelphia Firebirds	NAHL	59	31	55	86	49	3	2	1	3	0
1974–75	Philadelphia Flyers	NHL	2	0	0	0	0	—	—	—	—	—
1975–76	Philadelphia Firebirds	NAHL	13	4	8	12	9	—	—	—	—	—
1975–76	Cape Codders	NAHL	35	13	23	36	24	—	—	—	—	—
1976–77	FPS	FIN	17	5	12	17	30	—	—	—	—	—
1976–77	HIFK	FIN	18	6	4	10	28	4	0	0	0	0
1978–79	Philadelphia Firebirds	AHL	3	0	0	0	0	—	—	—	—	—
WHA totals			41	1	15	16	44	1	0	0	0	12
NHL totals			2	0	0	0	0	—	—	—	—	—
