= Doug Sellars =

Canadian television executive

Doug Sellars (1961 – December 30, 2011) was a Canadian television executive who worked for the Canadian Broadcasting Corporation (CBC) and Fox Sports.

Sellars, a native of Toronto, graduated from Ryerson Polytechnical Institute in 1985 and immediately went to work for CBC's Hockey Night in Canada. He was quickly promoted and produced his first Grey Cup at age 27. By 1989, was in charge of all of CBC Sports productions, including several Olympic and Commonwealth Games, and went on to win multiple Gemini Awards.

Sellars worked at CBC Sports as a senior executive until 2000, when he left to join Fox. He started as a producer for Fox's regional sports network and was involved with National Hockey League and other professional sports broadcasts. In August 2010, Sellars was promoted to Executive Vice President, Production and Executive Producer of the Fox Sports Media Group in Los Angeles, where he was in charge of studio and event production for Fox Sports and its specialty channels.

Sellars was married to Barb and had two children, Tyler and Kelsey. On December 30, 2011, Sellars died at age 50 after suffering an apparent heart attack during a pick-up hockey game. Following his death, both Hockey Night in Canada and the NFL on Fox paid tribute to Sellars during their weekly pregame shows. He was also specifically thanked 'in memory of' at the end of the Fox's coverage of the 2015 FIFA Women's World Cup.
