= Seaton McLean =

Canadian film and television producer

Seaton McLean is a Canadian film and television producer. He co-founded Atlantis Films. He oversaw all production activity for the Atlantis Films Limited, producing television series like White Fang, Traders, Earth: Final Conflict, Kurt Vonnegut's Welcome to the Monkey House, The Ray Bradbury Theater, PSI Factor and The Eleventh Hour.

He is married to actress Sonja Smits, with whom he has two children.
