= Les Harris (producer) =

Canadian producer

Les Harris is a Canadian television producer and filmmaker.

Harris co-founded Canamedia Productions with his wife & executive producer, Jane Harris in 1979. He was also the co-founder of the YTV children's cable television network in Canada. Apart from founding Canamedia he also designed and had built a sports car whilst at Sheffield University called a Harmoke. tele By the time of its acquisition by Distribution Access in 2010, the production company had built up a factually-based catalog of more than 1500 titles.

== Partial filmography ==
“International Dragging In Olde England”. A half hour 16mm documentary written, directed and edited by Les Harris on early drag car racing that aired on London Weekend Television in the UK. “Chabot Solo”. Pts1,2&3. Three one hour 16mm documentaries on the history of flight told through the eyes of the world’s oldest aviator at the time of filming, Englishman Charles Chabot. Pt. 1 starts in 1914 with Chabot learning in a Maurice Farnham Longhorn & then a Bleriot and ends with him flying Bristol Fighters & ending up alive but in hospital. Pt2 starts in 1918 and ends in 1939 & includes Chabot failing to win the UK to Australia air race & failing to convince P&O that mail could go by air. Pt 3 starts in 1939 with Chabot being sent to South Africa to train pilots and then to India where he discovered why all our Mosquitoes were crashing. It ends with Chabot illegally piloting Concorde at Mach 2.3 on a test flight from Gander, Newfoundland to Heathrow. The three 16mm one hour films were researched, written, directed, produced and edited by Les Harris whilst he was in London England before he moved to Toronto, Canada. They are the first examples of the technique he used throughout his directing career that use no narration and have the subject always look right into the camera lens. The 3 films were all broadcast by BBC TV throughout the UK. They are currently stored at the Museum of Aviation in Ottawa, Canada.

- Escape from Iran: The Canadian Caper (1981)

A TV movie of the week about the escape of 6 American diplomats from Iran by the Canadians during the Iran–US embassy hostage crisis. The movie was based on Les Harris’s independent one hour documentary aired by CBC TV that he researched, wrote, directed and produced called Escape From Iran: The Inside Story. It was from this documentary that Ben Affleck got the main story line for Argo of where the six US escaped diplomats went to hide in Tehran after the US embassy had been overrun. The movie was the first Canadian movie of the week ever commissioned by a US broadcaster, which was CBS TV, which simulcast the movie with CTV in Canada. It starred Gordon Pinsent as Canadian Ambassador Ken Taylor. The original script by Lionel Chetwynd was thrown out by Harris and although Chetwind’s credit remains on the film as writer, the final script was based on Harris’s documentary Escape From Iran: The Inside Story. 1979 Iranian hostage crisis.

- Lorne Greene's New Wilderness (1982)
- 444 Days to Freedom: What Really Happened in Iran (1986)

Documentary about the 1979 Iranian hostage crisis.

- Hostage in Iran (1986)

PBS Frontline documentary about the 1979 Iranian hostage crisis.

- Adderly (1988)

Other films for TV directed, written, produced and edited made by Harris include:

FRONTIER FOOTLIGHTS, a one hour documentary about the Sudbury Theatre company's touring group who were the first to ever venture into the high arctic to perform live theatre to first nation school kids. First aired on TV Ontario.

PADRE PABLO: FIGHTER FOR JUSTICE. A tv one hour doc on Father Harvey Steele, a Canadian Scarboro Foreign Missionary Roman Catholic priest who started the co-op movement in Latin America. Filmed in Panama & the Dominican Republic. Aired on TVO and CBCTV. BY THE SEAT OF THEIR PANTS. A one hour documentary about the bush pilots of Canada's arctic. Includes the only in depth interview with Marten Hartwell, the pilot who ate the killed British nurse, in order to survive. Harris also produced & was the supervising editor of THREADS OF HOPE, directed by his assistant, Andrew Johnson. Other dramas produced by Harris were: THE KING OF FRIDAY NIGHT, a TV musical adaption commissioned by CBC TV of John Gray's play "Rock'nRoll". It won 7 international awards including a Rockie for best film. ADDERLY, a one hour TV drama series for CBS TV daytime, for which he was the originating producer, and starred Winston Reckert . TAKE OFF, a 26 part half hour children's educational drama, which he produced with Hilary Jones-Farrow in Vancouver & Victoria. B.C.
