= Karl Nerenberg =

Canadian journalist, broadcaster and filmmaker

Karl Nerenberg (born 1947) is a Canadian journalist, broadcaster and filmmaker, working in both English and French languages. Since 2011 he has been the parliamentary correspondent, based in Ottawa, for the online, left-of-centre Canadian newsmagazine rabble.ca.

== Filmmaking ==
Nerenberg wrote, produced and co-directed (with Malcolm Hamilton) the feature-length documentary film Never Come Back, about the Roma (sometimes called Gypsy) communities of Canada and central Europe. Never Come Back was first broadcast by OMNI television in Canada, subsequently by the Canadian Broadcasting Corporation’s ‘documentary’ network, and presented at a number of festivals worldwide. In 2013, Never Come Back received the award for best documentary from the Canadian Ethnic Media Association. Nerenberg also co-directed and wrote the feature-length documentary And Who Are You? which profiled four Canadians of Polish origin, two Jews and two Gentiles, as they travelled to Poland to explore their roots.

== Broadcasting ==
From 1977 to 2000, Nerenberg worked in a number of capacities at both the English and French networks of the Canadian Broadcasting Corporation (CBC). In 1990, the CBC English network weekly television program On the Road Again, of which he was executive producer, won the Gemini award for best light information series. In 1986, for the CBC French network television program Le Point, Nerenberg produced a report that exposed flaws in the Canadian airport security system.

From 1992 to 2000 Nerenberg was senior editor of the CBC English radio network's weekly show on federal politics, The House.

== NGO work ==
Nerenberg also worked in the non-governmental sector, notably for the Canadian-based international organization the Forum of Federations, where he directed communications and worked on peace building in Sri Lanka. While at Forum, he co-edited the Handbook on Federal Countries, published by McGill-Queen's University Press.

== Notable work ==
In 2013, Nerenberg reported on an apology broadcaster Ezra Levant issued for derogatory comments he had made, on-air, about the Roma people.

Nerenberg had earlier reported on Levant's controversial television report "The Jew Versus the Gypsies", a broadcast that resulted in a Toronto Police and Ontario Attorney General hate crime investigation. In his story, Nerenberg pointed out a number of ways in which Levant's broadcast appeared to have violated the hate crimes provision of Canada's criminal code.

== Awards ==
Nerenberg has won a number of awards for his work, including a Golden Sheaf from the Yorkton (Saskatchewan) film and television festival for a Canada Day special for CBC English language television entitled "Journey to Bacon Cove", and the 1985 award for best international reportage from the Communauté des televisions francophones (French language television community), for a series of reports on Apartheid era South Africa entitled "l’Afrique du sud: quatre portraits" broadcast on the CBC French network daily television program Le Point.

Nerenberg appears regularly on such radio shows as The Sheldon MacLeod Show on News 95.7 in Halifax, Nova Scotia. His work for rabble.ca has been republished frequently by the Canadian news aggregator National Newswatch and a number of his articles for rabble.ca were collected into a book, Harper vs. Canada: Five Ways of Looking at the Conservative Regime.

== Personal life ==
Nerenberg graduated from McGill University (1971). He is married and is an enthusiastic amateur jazz pianist.
