= Canadian Screen Award for Best TV Movie =

Canadian television award

The Canadian Screen Award for Best TV Movie is a Canadian television award, presented by the Academy of Canadian Cinema and Television to honour the year's best Canadian television film. Originally presented as part of the Gemini Awards, since 2013 it has been presented as part of the Canadian Screen Awards.

From the inception of the Gemini Awards in 1986 until 1994, separate awards were presented for television films and miniseries; since 1995, they have usually been merged into a single Limited Series or Dramatic Program category covering both types of programs, but were sometimes split out into separate categories again in the latter half of the 2000s. As of the 8th Canadian Screen Awards in 2020, dramatic limited series are now eligible for the Canadian Screen Award for Best Dramatic Series instead of either having their own category or being merged with television films.

== Nominees and winners ==
=== 1980s ===
Year	Film	Producers
1986; 1st Gemini Awards
1986; 1st Gemini Awards	Best Dramatic Miniseries	
1986; 1st Gemini Awards	Anne of Green Gables	Kevin Sullivan, Ian McDougall
1986; 1st Gemini Awards	Red Serge	Neil Sutherland
1986; 1st Gemini Awards	Spearfield's Daughter	David Patterson
1986; 1st Gemini Awards	Best TV Movie	
1986; 1st Gemini Awards	Love and Larceny	Robert Sherrin
1986; 1st Gemini Awards	The Execution of Raymond Graham	Julian Marks, David W. Rintels
1986; 1st Gemini Awards	Tramp at the Door	Stan Thomas, Don Brinton
1987; 2nd Gemini Awards
1987; 2nd Gemini Awards	Best Dramatic Miniseries	
1987; 2nd Gemini Awards	Ford: The Man and the Machine	David Patterson
1987; 2nd Gemini Awards	Sword of Gideon	Robert Lantos
1987; 2nd Gemini Awards	Best TV Movie	
1987; 2nd Gemini Awards	The Marriage Bed	Bill Gough
1987; 2nd Gemini Awards	Screen Two: "Going Home"	W. Paterson Ferns
1988; 3rd Gemini Awards
1988; 3rd Gemini Awards	Best Dramatic Miniseries	
1988; 3rd Gemini Awards	Anne of Avonlea	Kevin Sullivan
1988; 3rd Gemini Awards	Hoover vs. The Kennedys	Paul Saltzman
1988; 3rd Gemini Awards	The King Chronicle	Adam Symansky
1988; 3rd Gemini Awards	Best TV Movie	
1988; 3rd Gemini Awards	Blades of Courage	Bernard Zukerman, Alan Burke
1988; 3rd Gemini Awards	And Then You Die	Bernard Zukerman, Brian McKenna
1988; 3rd Gemini Awards	Family Reunion	Robert Sherrin
1988; 3rd Gemini Awards	A Nest of Singing Birds	Peter Kelly, Flora Macdonald
1989; 4th Gemini Awards
1989; 4th Gemini Awards	Best Dramatic Miniseries	
1989; 4th Gemini Awards	Glory Enough for All	W. Paterson Ferns, Joseph Green, Gordon Hinch, David Elstein
1989; 4th Gemini Awards	Glory! Glory!	Michael MacMillan, Bonny Dore, Stan Daniels, Jonathan Goodwill, Seaton McLean
1989; 4th Gemini Awards	Passion and Paradise	Peter Jefferies, Ian McDougall, W. Paterson Ferns, Michael Custance
1989; 4th Gemini Awards	Best TV Movie	
1989; 4th Gemini Awards	The Squamish Five	Bernard Zukerman
1989; 4th Gemini Awards	Two Men	William Gough

=== 1990s ===
Year	Film	Producers
1990; 5th Gemini Awards
1990; 5th Gemini Awards	Best Dramatic Miniseries	
1990; 5th Gemini Awards	Love and Hate: The Story of Colin and JoAnn Thatcher	Bernard Zukerman
1990; 5th Gemini Awards	The French Revolution	Antoine de Clermont-Tonnerre, Alexandre Mnouchkine, Denis Héroux, Robert Lantos
1990; 5th Gemini Awards	Best TV Movie	
1990; 5th Gemini Awards	Where the Spirit Lives	Paul Stephens, Mary Young Leckie, Eric Jordan, Heather Haldane
1990; 5th Gemini Awards	Divided Loyalties	Gerry Rochon, Tom Gould
1990; 5th Gemini Awards	E.N.G.: "Pilot"	Jeff King, Jennifer Black, Robert Lantos, Bob Carney
1990; 5th Gemini Awards	Looking for Miracles	Trudy Grant, Kevin Sullivan
1991; 6th Gemini Awards
1991; 6th Gemini Awards	Best Dramatic Miniseries	
1991; 6th Gemini Awards	Young Catherine	Stephen Smallwood, W. Paterson Ferns, Michael Deeley
1991; 6th Gemini Awards	The First Circle	Claude Héroux
1991; 6th Gemini Awards	Best TV Movie	
1991; 6th Gemini Awards	Deadly Betrayal: The Bruce Curtis Story	Peter Alan Sussman, Seaton McLean, Barry Cowling
1991; 6th Gemini Awards	Getting Married in Buffalo Jump	Flora Macdonald, Peter Kelly
1991; 6th Gemini Awards	Princes in Exile	John Dunning, Colin Neale, Marrin Canell, André Link, Irene Litinsky
1991; 6th Gemini Awards	Rookies	Peter Alan Sussman, Seaton McLean, Michael MacMillan, Martin Harbury
1992; 7th Gemini Awards
1992; 7th Gemini Awards	Best Dramatic Miniseries	
1992; 7th Gemini Awards	Conspiracy of Silence	Bernard Zukerman
1992; 7th Gemini Awards	Bethune: The Making of a Hero	Nicolas Clermont, Pieter Kroonenburg
1992; 7th Gemini Awards	The Sound and the Silence	Michael MacMillan, Kim Todd, Luciano Lisi, Jon Glascoe
1992; 7th Gemini Awards	Best TV Movie	
1992; 7th Gemini Awards	Scales of Justice: "Regina vs. Nelles"	George Jonas
1992; 7th Gemini Awards	Christmas on Division Street	Colleen Nystedt, Tony Allard
1992; 7th Gemini Awards	Quiet Killer	Steve Levitan, Lynn Raynor, Paul Saltzman, Edgar J. Scherick
1992; 7th Gemini Awards	Rapture	Richard Borchiver, Jon Slan
1992; 7th Gemini Awards	School's Out	Kit Hood, Linda Schuyler
1993; 8th Gemini Awards
1993; 8th Gemini Awards	Best Dramatic Miniseries	
1993; 8th Gemini Awards	The Boys of St. Vincent	Sam Grana, Claudio Luca
1993; 8th Gemini Awards	Woman on the Run: The Lawrencia Bembenek Story	Robert Lantos, Ian McDougall, Michael Weisbarth
1993; 8th Gemini Awards	Best TV Movie	
1993; 8th Gemini Awards	The Diviners	Peter Alan Sussman, Derek Mazur, William Wallace Gray, Kim Todd
1993; 8th Gemini Awards	Adrift	Peter Alan Sussman, Jonathan Goodwill
1993; 8th Gemini Awards	Gross Misconduct: The Life of Brian Spencer	Alan Burke
1993; 8th Gemini Awards	I'll Never Get to Heaven	Flora Macdonald
1993; 8th Gemini Awards	Liar, Liar	Phil Savath
1994; 9th Gemini Awards
1994; 9th Gemini Awards	Best Dramatic Miniseries	
1994; 9th Gemini Awards	Dieppe	Bernard Zukerman
1994; 9th Gemini Awards	Best TV Movie	
1994; 9th Gemini Awards	Due South: "Pilot"	Paul Haggis, Jeff King
1994; 9th Gemini Awards	Coming of Age	Ira Levy, Barri Cohen, Peter Williamson
1994; 9th Gemini Awards	For the Love of Aaron	Bob Gray
1994; 9th Gemini Awards	Heads	Marty Tudor, Peter Alan Sussman, Derek Mazur, William Wallace Gray, Jonathan Goodwill
1994; 9th Gemini Awards	Life with Billy	Eric Jordan, Michael Donovan
1995; 10th Gemini Awards
1995; 10th Gemini Awards	Butterbox Babies	Trudy Grant, Kevin Sullivan
1995; 10th Gemini Awards	Choices of the Heart: The Margaret Sanger Story	Julian Marks, Jennifer Alward, Clara George, Paul Shapiro
1995; 10th Gemini Awards	Million Dollar Babies	Micheline Charest, Bernard Zukerman
1995; 10th Gemini Awards	Small Gifts	Flora Macdonald
1995; 10th Gemini Awards	The Outer Limits: "Sandkings"	Richard Barton Lewis, John Watson, Pen Densham, Justis Greene, James Nadler
1996; 11th Gemini Awards
1996; 11th Gemini Awards	Net Worth	Bernard Zukerman
1996; 11th Gemini Awards	Little Criminals	Phil Savath, Barbara Kelly
1996; 11th Gemini Awards	Mother Trucker: The Diana Kilmury Story	Laszlo Barna, Anne Wheeler, Christine Shipton
1996; 11th Gemini Awards	The War Between Us	Valerie Gray, William Wallace Gray, Walter Daroshin, Gary Harvey
1996; 11th Gemini Awards	Under the Piano	Trudy Grant, Kevin Sullivan
1997; 12th Gemini Awards
1997; 12th Gemini Awards	Hiroshima	Kazutoshi Wadakura, Robin Spry, Michael Campus, Paul E. Painter, Andrew Adelson, Tracey Alexander
1997; 12th Gemini Awards	The Arrow	Eric Jordan, Aaron Kim Johnston, Mary Young Leckie, Paul Stephens, Jack Clements
1997; 12th Gemini Awards	Captains Courageous	Robert Halmi Sr., Lisa Towers, Tony Allard, Matthew O'Connor
1997; 12th Gemini Awards	Dangerous Offender: The Marlene Moore Story	Duncan Lamb, Bonita Siegel
1997; 12th Gemini Awards	Giant Mine	Alan Burke
1998; 13th Gemini Awards
1998; 13th Gemini Awards	The Sleep Room	Bernard Zukerman, Micheline Charest, Ronald A. Weinberg
1998; 13th Gemini Awards	Borrowed Hearts	Mary Kahn, Peter Alan Sussman, Ed Gernon, Gary Delfiner, Roma Downey
1998; 13th Gemini Awards	Pit Pony	Andrew Cochran
1998; 13th Gemini Awards	Platinum	Joanne Forgues, Madeleine Henrié, Claude Godbout
1998; 13th Gemini Awards	White Lies	Phil Savath
1999; 14th Gemini Awards
1999; 14th Gemini Awards	Milgaard	Vibika Bianchi, Laszlo Barna, Ritchard Findlay, Martin Harbury, Laura Lightbown
1999; 14th Gemini Awards	At the End of the Day: The Sue Rodriguez Story	Laszlo Barna, Bob Miller, Sheldon Larry
1999; 14th Gemini Awards	Happy Christmas, Miss King	Trudy Grant, Kevin Sullivan
1999; 14th Gemini Awards	Justice	Alyson Feltes, Brian Dennis, Seaton McLean
1999; 14th Gemini Awards	Shot Through the Heart	Robert Lantos, Su Armstrong, Francine Lefrak, David M. Thompson

=== 2000s ===
Year	Film	Producers
2000; 15th Gemini Awards
2000; 15th Gemini Awards	Dr. Lucille: The Lucille Teasdale Story	Claude Bonin, Francine Allaire, André Picard
2000; 15th Gemini Awards	Murder Most Likely	Bob Carney, Paul Gross, Frank Siracusa, Robert Forsyth, Anne Marie La Traverse
2000; 15th Gemini Awards	One Heart Broken Into Song	Terry Greenlaw, William D. MacGillivray
2000; 15th Gemini Awards	Restless Spirits	Susan Cavan, Patrick Whitley, Sheila Hockin
2000; 15th Gemini Awards	The Sheldon Kennedy Story	Doug MacLeod, Pierre Sarrazin
2001; 16th Gemini Awards
2001; 16th Gemini Awards	Best Dramatic Miniseries	
2001; 16th Gemini Awards	Nuremberg	Alec Baldwin, Jonathan Cornick, Gerald W. Abrams, Peter Alan Sussman, Suzanne Girard, Ian McDougall, Mychèle Boudrias
2001; 16th Gemini Awards	Haven	Peter Alan Sussman, Mark Winemaker, Paulette Breen
2001; 16th Gemini Awards	Revenge of the Land	Bernard Zukerman
2001; 16th Gemini Awards	Best TV Movie	
2001; 16th Gemini Awards	Scorn	Christian Bruyère, Laszlo Barna, Maryke McEwen
2001; 16th Gemini Awards	Blessed Stranger: After Flight 111	Wayne Grigsby, David MacLeod
2001; 16th Gemini Awards	Chasing Cain	Michael Donovan, Bernard Zukerman, Jerry Ciccoritti
2001; 16th Gemini Awards	Lucky Girl	Anne Marie La Traverse, Louise Garfield
2001; 16th Gemini Awards	The Secret Life of Algernon	Nancy Marano
2002; 17th Gemini Awards
2002; 17th Gemini Awards	Torso: The Evelyn Dick Story	Christina Jennings, Stephen Alix, Scott Garvie, Paul Stephens
2002; 17th Gemini Awards	Further Tales of the City	Suzanne Girard, Luc Châtelain, Alan Poul, Tim Bevan
2002; 17th Gemini Awards	Jinnah on Crime: Pizza 911	Hugh Beard, Debra Beard
2002; 17th Gemini Awards	Society's Child	Julia Sereny, Phyllis Laing, Jennifer Kawaja, Sharon McGowan
2002; 17th Gemini Awards	Stolen Miracle	Joy Rosen, Lisa Olfman
2003; 18th Gemini Awards
2003; 18th Gemini Awards	100 Days in the Jungle	Nicolette Saina, Sean O'Byrne, Matthew O'Connor, Tom Rowe, Mary Anne Waterhouse
2003; 18th Gemini Awards	AKA Albert Walker	Anne Marie La Traverse, Jonathan Cavendish, Sophie Gardiner, Mike Dormer
2003; 18th Gemini Awards	Chasing Cain: Face	Bernard Zukerman, Michael Prupas
2003; 18th Gemini Awards	The Interrogation of Michael Crowe	Terry Gould, Jean Bureau
2003; 18th Gemini Awards	The Many Trials of One Jane Doe	Bernard Zukerman, Michael Prupas, Jamie Brown, Kim Todd
2004; 19th Gemini Awards
2004; 19th Gemini Awards	Human Cargo	Hugh Beard, Debra Beard, Brian McKeown, Linda Svendsen
2004; 19th Gemini Awards	Cowboys and Indians: The J. J. Harper Story	Eric Jordan, Jeremy Torrie
2004; 19th Gemini Awards	Elizabeth Rex	Jennifer Jonas, Niv Fichman, Daniel Iron
2004; 19th Gemini Awards	The Incredible Mrs. Ritchie	Chad Oakes, Michael Frislev
2004; 19th Gemini Awards	Open Heart	Laszlo Barna, Brian Dennis, Timothy M. Hogan, Phyllis Platt
2005; 20th Gemini Awards
2005; 20th Gemini Awards	Best Dramatic Miniseries	
2005; 20th Gemini Awards	Sex Traffic	Wayne Grigsby, Michele Buck, David MacLeod, Derek Wax
2005; 20th Gemini Awards	H_{2}O	Paul Gross, Frank Siracusa
2005; 20th Gemini Awards	Lives of the Saints	Gabriella Martinelli, Giovanna Arata
2005; 20th Gemini Awards	Best TV Movie	
2005; 20th Gemini Awards	Tripping the Wire	Arnie Gelbart, Francine Allaire, Anne Marie La Traverse
2005; 20th Gemini Awards	Burn: The Robert Wraight Story	Heather Haldane, Randy Bradshaw, Doug MacLeod, Mary Young Leckie
2005; 20th Gemini Awards	The Last Casino	Greg Dummett, Madelaine Henrie
2005; 20th Gemini Awards	The Life	Chris Haddock, Lynn Barr, Laura Lightbown, Arvi Liimatainen, Pierre Sarrazin
2006; 21st Gemini Awards
2006; 21st Gemini Awards	Best Dramatic Miniseries	
2006; 21st Gemini Awards	Human Trafficking	Michael Prupas, Christian Duguay, Irene Litinsky
2006; 21st Gemini Awards	Prairie Giant: The Tommy Douglas Story	Kevin DeWalt
2006; 21st Gemini Awards	Trudeau II: Maverick in the Making	Wayne Grigsby, David MacLeod
2006; 21st Gemini Awards	Best TV Movie	
2006; 21st Gemini Awards	Hunt for Justice	Arnie Gelbart, Francine Allaire, Randy Holleschau, Anne Marie La Traverse, Christine Ruppert
2006; 21st Gemini Awards	Heyday!	Anna Stratton, Robin Cass, Paul Pope
2006; 21st Gemini Awards	Intelligence: "Pilot"	Chris Haddock, Carwyn Jones, Laura Lightbown, Arvi Liimatainen, Stephen Surjik
2006; 21st Gemini Awards	One Dead Indian	Brent Barclay, Jennifer Kawaja, Julia Sereny, Kevin Tierney
2006; 21st Gemini Awards	Terry	Christina Jennings, Shawn Ashmore, Patrick Cassavetti, Scott Garvie, Gail Harvey, Shane Kinnear, Julie Lacey, Laurie McLarty, Paul Nicholls
2007; 22nd Gemini Awards
2007; 22nd Gemini Awards	Best Dramatic Miniseries	
2007; 22nd Gemini Awards	Dragon Boys	Michael Chechik, Howard Dancyger, Ian Weir
2007; 22nd Gemini Awards	Answered by Fire	Michael Prupas, Roger Le Mesurier, Barbara Samuels, Roger Simpson, Andrew Walker
2007; 22nd Gemini Awards	Best TV Movie	
2007; 22nd Gemini Awards	Doomstown	Pierre Sarrazin, Suzette Couture, Susan Murdoch
2007; 22nd Gemini Awards	Eight Days to Live	Christina Jennings, Scott Garvie, Ken Gord, Graham Ludlow, Laurie McLarty, Virginia Rankin, Kelly Rowan
2007; 22nd Gemini Awards	In God's Country	Christina Jennings, Scott Garvie, Robert O. Green, Julie Lacey, Graham Ludlow, Laurie McLarty, Kelly Rowan, Paul Stephens
2007; 22nd Gemini Awards	Last Exit	Richard Lalonde, Daniel Iron
2007; 22nd Gemini Awards	The Robber Bride	Christina Jennings, Brian Dennis, Scott Garvie, Julia Stannard, Simon Wright
2008; 23rd Gemini Awards
2008; 23rd Gemini Awards	Best Dramatic Miniseries	
2008; 23rd Gemini Awards	The Englishman's Boy	Kevin DeWalt
2008; 23rd Gemini Awards	Across the River to Motor City	Robert Wertheimer, David Devine, Richard Mozer
2008; 23rd Gemini Awards	Would Be Kings	Ilana Frank, Tassie Cameron, Daphne Park, Ray Sager, Peter R. Simpson, Esta Spalding, David Wellington
2008; 23rd Gemini Awards	Best TV Movie	
2008; 23rd Gemini Awards	Mayerthorpe	Jordy Randall, Tom Cox, Jon Slan
2008; 23rd Gemini Awards	A Life Interrupted	Jean Bureau, Anne Carlucci, Serge Denis, Stephen Greenberg, Josée Mauffette
2008; 23rd Gemini Awards	Luna: Spirit of the Whale	Trish Dolman
2008; 23rd Gemini Awards	Sticks and Stones	Josée Vallée, André Béraud, Tim Hogan, Rick LeGuerrier
2008; 23rd Gemini Awards	Victor	Bernard Zukerman
2009; 24th Gemini Awards
2009; 24th Gemini Awards	Best Dramatic Miniseries	
2009; 24th Gemini Awards	Burn Up	Tom Cox, Stephen Garrett
2009; 24th Gemini Awards	Diamonds	Jennifer Kawaja, Liz Jarvis, Phyllis Laing, Philo Pieterse, Julia Sereny, Carrie Stein, Simon Vaughan, Nick Witkowski
2009; 24th Gemini Awards	The Last Templar	Robert Halmi, Michael Prupas, Irene Litinsky
2009; 24th Gemini Awards	XIII: The Conspiracy	Ken Gord, Thomas Anargyros, Edouard de Vésinne, Jay Firestone
2009; 24th Gemini Awards	Best TV Movie	
2009; 24th Gemini Awards	Elijah	Blake Corbet, Gigi Boyd, Kevin Eastwood, Chris Leeson, Lisa Meeches, Mary Anne Waterhouse
2009; 24th Gemini Awards	Céline	Laszlo Barna, Steven Silver
2009; 24th Gemini Awards	In a World Created by a Drunken God	Kirstie McLellan, Larry Day
2009; 24th Gemini Awards	Of Murder and Memory	Ilana Frank, Daniel Iron, Semi Chellas, David Wellington
2009; 24th Gemini Awards	The Secret of the Nutcracker	Joe Novak, Matt Gillespie, Jim Sutherland, Shirley Vercruysse
2009; 24th Gemini Awards	The Terrorist Next Door	Pierre Sarrazin, Suzette Couture, Richard Lalonde, Susan Murdoch

=== 2010s ===
Year	Film	Producers
2010; 25th Gemini Awards
2010; 25th Gemini Awards	Best Dramatic Miniseries	
2010; 25th Gemini Awards	The Summit	Robert Cohen, Shari Cohen, Robin Neinstein, Christina Jennings, Scott Garvie, Adam Haight
2010; 25th Gemini Awards	Alice	Matthew O'Connor, Robert Halmi Sr., Robert A. Halmi, Jamie Brown, Lisa Richardson
2010; 25th Gemini Awards	The Phantom	Robert Halmi Sr., Robert A. Halmi, Irene Litinsky, Michael Prupas
2010; 25th Gemini Awards	Best TV Movie	
2010; 25th Gemini Awards	She Drives Me Crazy	Christina Jennings, Scott Garvie, Julian Grant, Robert O. Green, Graham Ludlow, Laurie McLarty, Sam Okun, Kelly Rowan
2010; 25th Gemini Awards	Abroad	Meredith Caplan, Leah McLaren, Julia Stannard, Simon Wright
2010; 25th Gemini Awards	Deadliest Sea	Karen Wookey
2010; 25th Gemini Awards	The Good Times Are Killing Me	Scott Garvie, Patrick Cassavetti, Laura Harbin, Noel Hedges, Graham Ludlow, Kelly Rowan, Julie Lacey, Jan Peter Meyboom, Meredith Caplan
2011; 26th Gemini Awards
2011; 26th Gemini Awards	The Pillars of the Earth	Jonas Bauer, Ridley Scott, Tony Scott, Rola Bauer, Michael Prupas, David W. Zucker, Tim Halkin, David A. Rosemont, John Ryan
2011; 26th Gemini Awards	Faker$	Greg Dummett, Lorraine Richard
2011; 26th Gemini Awards	The Kennedys	Steven Michaels, Michael Prupas, Joel Surnow, Jonathan Koch, Jamie Paul Rock, Jon Cassar, Stephen Kronish
2011; 26th Gemini Awards	My Babysitter's a Vampire	Tom McGillis, George Elliott, Brian Irving, Jennifer Pertsch
2011; 26th Gemini Awards	Sleepyhead	Greg Dummett, Jolyon Symonds, Lorraine Richard
2012; 1st Canadian Screen Awards
2012; 1st Canadian Screen Awards	Magic Beyond Words	Ronald Gilbert, Karine Martin, Jean-François Doray, Paul A. Kaufman
2012; 1st Canadian Screen Awards	Cyberbully	Michael Prupas, Jesse Prupas, Joel S. Rice
2012; 1st Canadian Screen Awards	Sunshine Sketches of a Little Town	Seaton McLean, Michael MacMillan, Stephen Roloff, Malcolm MacRury, Brian Dennis
2012; 1st Canadian Screen Awards	The Wrath of Grapes: The Don Cherry Story II	Margaret O'Brien, Jamie Brown, Laszlo Barna, Lesley Oswald, Andrew Wreggitt, Jeff Woolnough, Tim Cherry, Wayne Thompson
2013; 2nd Canadian Screen Awards
2013; 2nd Canadian Screen Awards	Borealis	Andrew Wreggitt, Arvi Liimatainen, Jon Slan, Jordy Randall, Tom Cox
2013; 2nd Canadian Screen Awards	The Horses of McBride	Frank Siracusa, Paul Gross
2013; 2nd Canadian Screen Awards	Mr. Hockey: The Gordie Howe Story	Brendon Sawatzky, Ian Dimerman, Karyn Edwards, Shawn Williamson, Stephen Hegyes
2013; 2nd Canadian Screen Awards	Time of Death	Ian Whitehead, Jean Bureau
2014; 3rd Canadian Screen Awards
2014; 3rd Canadian Screen Awards	Bomb Girls: Facing the Enemy	Janis Lundman, Adrienne Mitchell, Michael Prupas
2014; 3rd Canadian Screen Awards	Baby Sellers	Robert Halmi Sr., Matthew O'Connor, Shan Tam
2014; 3rd Canadian Screen Awards	The Best Laid Plans	Brian Dennis, Peter Moss, Phyllis Platt
2014; 3rd Canadian Screen Awards	Bunks	Ian Dimerman, George Elliott, Brian Irving, Tom McGillis, Jennifer Pertsch, Brendon Sawatzky
2015; 4th Canadian Screen Awards
2015; 4th Canadian Screen Awards	The Book of Negroes	Michael Levine, Damon D'Oliveira, Bill Niven, Margaret O'Brien, Lance Samuels, Carrie Stein, Clement Virgo
2015; 4th Canadian Screen Awards	First Response	Jean Bureau, Ian Whitehead
2015; 4th Canadian Screen Awards	Forget and Forgive	Jean Bureau, Ian Whitehead
2015; 4th Canadian Screen Awards	Kept Woman	Jean Bureau, Ian Whitehead
2015; 4th Canadian Screen Awards	Studio Black!	Terry Greenlaw, William D. MacGillivray
2016; 5th Canadian Screen Awards
2016; 5th Canadian Screen Awards	Murdoch Mysteries: A Merry Murdoch Christmas	Paul Aitken, Kate Barnes, Yannick Bisson, Scott Garvie, Carol Hay, Christina Jennings, Julie Lacey, Peter Mitchell, Stephen Montgomery
2016; 5th Canadian Screen Awards	Odd Squad: The Movie	J.J. Johnson, Blair Powers, Matthew Bishop, Timothy McKeon, Adam Peltzman, Mark De Angelis
2016; 5th Canadian Screen Awards	Slasher	Aaron Martin, Jay Bennett, Scott Garvie, Christina Jennings, Thomas P. Vitale, David Anselmo, Craig David Wallace, Saralo MacGregor, Ian Carpenter, Jonathan Ford
2016; 5th Canadian Screen Awards	Unclaimed	Stevie Cameron, Rupert Harvey, Jim Howell
2017; 6th Canadian Screen Awards
2017; 6th Canadian Screen Awards	Alias Grace	Noreen Halpern, Sarah Polley, Mary Harron, D.J. Carson
2017; 6th Canadian Screen Awards	Bruno & Boots: This Can't Be Happening at Macdonald Hall	Anthony Leo, Andrew Rosen
2017; 6th Canadian Screen Awards	Cardinal	Jennifer Kawaja, Julia Sereny, Jocelyn Hamilton, Armand Leo
2017; 6th Canadian Screen Awards	The Disappearance	Joanne Forgues, Jean-Marc Casanova, Sophie Parizeau
2017; 6th Canadian Screen Awards	The Kennedys: After Camelot	Michael Prupas, Keri Selig, Jon Cassar, Stan E. Hubbard, Stephen Kronish
2018; 7th Canadian Screen Awards
2018; 7th Canadian Screen Awards	Cardinal: Blackfly Season	Jennifer Kawaja, Julia Sereny, Jocelyn Hamilton, Armand Leo
2018; 7th Canadian Screen Awards	Caught	Rob Blackie, Peter Blackie, Michael Levine, John Vatcher, Perry Chafe, Alex Patrick, Allan Hawco
2018; 7th Canadian Screen Awards	The Indian Detective	Russell Peters, Frank Spotnitz, Lance Samuels, Mark Burton, Daniel Iron
2018; 7th Canadian Screen Awards	Second Opinion	Jean Bureau, Ian Whitehead
2019; 8th Canadian Screen Awards
2019; 8th Canadian Screen Awards	Believe Me: The Abduction of Lisa McVey	Jeff Vanderwal, Charles Tremayne, Sherri Rufh, Kim Bondi
2019; 8th Canadian Screen Awards	#Roxy	Camille Beaudoin, Eric Rebalkin
2019; 8th Canadian Screen Awards	Claws of the Red Dragon	Kevin Yang, Sophia Sun, Joe Wang, Joel Etienne
2019; 8th Canadian Screen Awards	Daughter of the Wolf	Kevin DeWalt, Douglas Falconer, Benjamin DeWalt, Danielle Masters
2019; 8th Canadian Screen Awards	Nowhere to Be Found	Paolo Mancini, Thomas Michael

=== 2020s ===
Year	Film	Producers	Ref
2020; 9th Canadian Screen Awards
2020; 9th Canadian Screen Awards	Christmas Jars	Jesse Prupas, Jonas Prupas, Misha Solomon, Shane Boucher	
2020; 9th Canadian Screen Awards	Glass Houses	Jean Bureau, Ian Whitehead	
2020; 9th Canadian Screen Awards	No Good Deed	Jean Bureau, Ian Whitehead	
2020; 9th Canadian Screen Awards	The Sanctuary	Allen Kool, Robin E. Crozier, David O’Keefe, Michael A. Charbon	
2021; 10th Canadian Screen Awards
2021; 10th Canadian Screen Awards	I Was Lorena Bobbitt	Jeff Vanderwal, Kim Bondi, Lorena Gallo, Sherri Rufh, Andy Streitfeld, Charles Tremayne	
2021; 10th Canadian Screen Awards	The Christmas Setup	Arnie Zipursky, Suzanne Berger, Shane Boucher, Ryan Greig, Danielle Von Zerneck, Larry Grimaldi, Hannah Pillemer, Fernando Szew	
2021; 10th Canadian Screen Awards	The Color of Love	Suzanne Chapman, Adam Gowland	
2021; 10th Canadian Screen Awards	Faith Heist	J.B. Sugar, Ella Myers, Ahmet Zappa, Erin Weiss, David Hudson, Arnie Zipursky	
2021; 10th Canadian Screen Awards	Midnight at the Magnolia	Arnie Zipursky, Marly Reed, Hayden Baptiste, Alexandra Waring, Andrew C. Erin, Marianne C. Wunch, Hannah Pillemer, Fernando Szew	
2022; 11th Canadian Screen Awards
2022; 11th Canadian Screen Awards	Swindler Seduction	Shane Boucher, Jonas Prupas, Caitlin Delaney, Jesse Prupas, Colton Haynes, Piers Vellacott, Sara Murray	
2022; 11th Canadian Screen Awards	A Chance for Christmas	Arnie Zipursky	
2022; 11th Canadian Screen Awards	Miracle in Motor City	Jeff Vanderwal, Sherri Rufh, Charles Tremayne, Tia Mowry-Hardrict	
2022; 11th Canadian Screen Awards	Saying Yes to Christmas	Tom Berry, Suzanne Chapman, Breanne Hartley, Sebastian Battro, Louisa Cadywould, Linda Stregger, Laurence Braun, Adam Gowland	
2022; 11th Canadian Screen Awards	Under the Christmas Tree	Arnie Zipursky	
2023; 12th Canadian Screen Awards
2023; 12th Canadian Screen Awards	The Girl Who Escaped: The Kara Robinson Story	Juliette Hagopian, Howard Braunstein, Elizabeth Smart, Joseph Freed, Allison Berkley	
2023; 12th Canadian Screen Awards	Christmas Island	Jesse Ikeman, Christopher Giroux, Terry Greenlaw	
2023; 12th Canadian Screen Awards	Never Too Late to Celebrate	Shane Boucher, Caitlin Delaney, Jonas Prupas, Joel S. Rice, Michael Barbuto, Aren Prupas	
2023; 12th Canadian Screen Awards	CBC Presents the Stratford Festival: "Richard III"	Barry Avrich, Susan Edwards, Mark Selby	
2023; 12th Canadian Screen Awards	Take Me Back for Christmas	Jesse Ikman, Evan Ottoni, Christopher Giroux, Bill Marks, Justin Rebelo, Nataline Rodrigues	
2024; 13th Canadian Screen Awards
2024; 13th Canadian Screen Awards	Wynonna Earp: Vengeance	Emily Andras, Jordy Randall, Tom Cox, Brett Burlock, Sonia Hosko, Paolo Barzman, Jess Maldaner	
2024; 13th Canadian Screen Awards	Boot Camp	Todd Berger, Julie Di Cresce, Lindsay Macadam, Gilles Laplante, Sabrina Spence, Jennifer Chen, Wendy McKernan, David Way, Aron Levitz, David Madden, Lindsay Weems Ramey	
2024; 13th Canadian Screen Awards	Buying Back My Daughter	Charles Cooper, Orly Adelson, Meagan Good, Allen Lewis, James Jope	
2024; 13th Canadian Screen Awards	Lowlifes	Charles Cooper, James Mattagne, Brad Luff, Eric Carnagey, Roger Lay Jr., Michael Shepard, Jon Kaplan, Allen Lewis, Patrick Tozer	
2024; 13th Canadian Screen Awards	'Twas the Date Before Christmas	Jeff Vanderwal, Sherri Rufh, J.C. Mills	

== See also ==
- Canadian television awards
