= 3rd Gemini Awards =

1988 awards for Canadian television

The 3rd Gemini Awards were held in 1988 to honour achievements in Canadian television. The ceremonies were sponsored by the Academy of Canadian Cinema and Television and held at the Metro Toronto Convention Centre on 29 and 30 November. It was broadcast on CBC.

== Awards ==
=== Programs ===
Best Drama Series	Best Dramatic Miniseries
Degrassi Junior High; He Shoots, He Scores; Night Heat; Street Legal	Anne of Avonlea; Hoover vs. The Kennedys; The King Chronicle
Best TV Movie	Short drama
Blades of Courage; And Then You Die; Family Reunion; A Nest of Singing Birds	A Child's Christmas in Wales; Family Matter; Hero of the Family; Max Haines Crime Flashback
Documentary program	Documentary series
Runaways: 24 Hours on the Street; Artist on Fire: The Work of Joyce Wieland; Asylum; Foster Child; North to Nowhere	The Nature of Things; Man Alive; The Space
Children's program	Children's series
They Look A Lot Like Us - A China Odyssey	Ramona; Mr. Dressup; Today's Special; What's New; Wonderstruck
Information series	Light information series
Venture; Land and Sea; Monitor; Reckoning: The Political Economy of Canada	Live It Up!; The NewMusic; Out Your Way
Variety program	Variety series
David Foster: The Symphony Sessions; 9th Genie Awards; Corey Hart Special; Gordon Pinsent Sings Those Hollywood Songs	It's Only Rock & Roll; The Comedy Mill; The Tommy Hunter Show
Animated program or series	Performing arts program
The Raccoons; Earth's Magnetic Field; The Nightingale	Masterclass with Menuhin; Much Ado About Nothing; Videovisions; Vivaldi
Sports program or series	
The Boys on the Bus; Export A Series Canadian National Disabled Skiing Championships; Shooting Stars; Sportsline

=== Actors ===
Lead actor, drama series	Lead actress, drama series
Pat Mastroianni, Degrassi Junior High; Patrick Bauchau, Mount Royal; Scott Hylands, Night Heat; Winston Rekert, Adderly; Donnelly Rhodes, Danger Bay	Sonja Smits, Street Legal; Ocean Hellman, Danger Bay; Sarah Polley, Ramona; Jessica Steen, Captain Power and the Soldiers of the Future
Lead actor, dramatic program or miniseries	Lead actress, dramatic program or miniseries
Kenneth Welsh, And Then You Die; Nicholas Campbell, Hoover vs. The Kennedys; Denholm Elliott, A Child's Christmas in Wales; Michael Ironside, The Ray Bradbury Theatre; R. H. Thomson, And Then You Die	Megan Follows, Anne of Green Gables: The Sequel; Christianne Hirt, Blades of Courage; Rebecca Jenkins, Family Reunion; Sheila McCarthy, A Nest of Singing Birds
Supporting actor, drama	Supporting actress, drama
Wayne Robson, And Then You Die; Henry Beckman, Family Reunion; Peter Boretski, Chasing Rainbows; Gary Reineke, The King Chronicle; Sandy Webster, The King Chronicle	Colleen Dewhurst, Anne of Green Gables: The Sequel; Rosemary Dunsmore, Blades of Courage; Wendy Hiller, Anne of Avonlea; Helen Hughes, The Kidnapping of Baby John Doe; Sophie Léger, Chasing Rainbows
Performance in a guest role	Performance in a variety or performing arts program or series
Martha Henry, Mount Royal; Danny Aiello, Night Heat; Sheila McCarthy, Mount Royal; Isabelle Mejias, Danger Bay; Marcel Sabourin, Mount Royal	k. d. lang, 1987 Canadian Country Music Awards

=== Journalism and sports ===
Best host, interviewer or anchor	Best sportscaster
Peter Mansbridge, Sunday Report; Eric Malling, The Fifth Estate; Bob McDonald, Wonderstruck; Christina Pochmursky, Monitor; Wayne Rostad, Out Our Way	Brian Williams, 1988 Winter Olympics; Chris Cuthbert, Hockey Night in Canada; Don Wittman and Ron Lancaster, 75th Grey Cup
Best news reportage	Best special event coverage
Don Murray, The National: "Occupied Territories Report - January, March, April 1988"; Robert Hurst, CTV National News; Roger Smith, CTV National News	1988 Winter Olympics (CTV Sports); Canadian Gymnastics Championships; Push for Power; Toronto Economic Summit
Best production of an information segment	Best news photography
Alister Bell, Michael Claydon, Michael Savoie, Jerry Thompson and Don Young, The Journal: "Agony of Bhopal"	Peter Warren, "Arctic Sovereignty"

=== Directing ===
Drama series	Dramatic program or miniseries
Kit Hood, Degrassi Junior High; Allan King, Danger Bay; George Mendeluk, Night Heat; Jorge Montesi, Night Heat; Brad Turner, The Beachcombers	Don McBrearty, A Child's Christmas in Wales; Francis Mankiewicz, And Then You Die; Michael O'Herlihy, Hoover vs. The Kennedys; Vic Sarin, Family Reunion
Information or documentary program or series	Variety or performing arts program or series
Bob McKeown, The Boys on the Bus	Barbara Willis Sweete, Guitar

=== Writing ===
Drama series	Drama program or miniseries
Tim Dunphy and Peter Mohan, Night Heat; Michael Mercer, The Beachcombers; Kevin Scanlon, Adderly; J. Michael Straczynski, Captain Power and the Soldiers of the Future; He Shoots, He Scores	Suzette Couture, Blades of Courage; Alun Hibbert and Wayne Grigsby, And Then You Die; Lionel E. Siegel, Hoover vs. The Kennedys; Joe Wiesenfeld, A Nest of Singing Birds
Comedy, variety or performing arts program or series	Information or documentary program or series
Avrum Jacobson, Family Reunion; 9th Genie Awards; Rick Jones, Derek Diorio, Dan Lalande and Kevin Gillis, The Raccoons; William J. Thomas, Breaking All the Rules	Kent Martin and James Laxer, Reckoning: The Political Economy of Canada: "In Bed With an Elephant"

=== Craft awards ===
Costume design	Production design
Martha Mann, Anne of Green Gables: The Sequel; Sherry McMorran, Captain Power and the Soldiers of the Future; Suzanne Mess, Chasing Rainbows; Pamela Woodward Conner, Family Reunion	Susan Longmire, Anne of Green Gables: The Sequel; Paul Ames, A Nest of Singing Birds; Susan Longmire, Captain Power and the Soldiers of the Future; Stephen Roloff, A Child's Christmas in Wales
Photography in a dramatic program or series	Photography in a comedy, variety or performing arts program or series
Marc Champion, Anne of Green Gables: The Sequel; Peter Benison, Captain Power and the Soldiers of the Future; David Herrington, Hoover vs. The Kennedys; Miklós Lente, Night Heat; Rick Maguire, Street Legal	Rene Ohashi, Masterclass with Menuhin
Photography in an information or documentary program or series	Picture editing in a dramatic program or series
Maurice Chabot, North to Nowhere: Quest for the Pole	Eric Wrate, Street Legal: "Assault"; Ralph Brunjes, Hoover vs. the Kennedys; Sally Paterson, A Child's Christmas in Wales; David B. Thompson, The Gunfighters; Mairin Wilkinson, Anne of Green Gables: The Sequel
Picture editing in a comedy, variety or performing arts program or series	Picture editing in an information or documentary program or series
Anthony Corindia, Michael McNamara and Mark Powers, Jane Siberry: I Muse Aloud	Vidal Beique, North to Nowhere: Quest for the Pole
Sound in a dramatic program or series	Sound in a comedy, variety or performing arts program or series
Dave Brown, Steve Gorman, Austin Grimaldi, Brian Newby and Kevin Townshend, Blades of Courage; Douglas Ganton, Cathy Hutton, Tony Currie, David Appleby and Wink Martin, Hoover vs. The Kennedys; Jean-Pierre Joutel, Julian Olson, Hans Oomes, Louis Hone and Adrian Croll, The King Chronicle; Gerry King, Dino Pigat, Austin Grimaldi and Kevin Townsend, And Then You Die	Brian Avery, Joe Grimaldi and Lock Johnston, Guitar
Sound in an information or documentary program or series	Music composition for a series
Dominique Chartrand, Serge Lacroix, John Martin and Daniel Masse, North to Nowhere: Quest for the Pole; Keith Bonnell, Life After Death; Clancy Livingston, Michael Lalonde, Barry Jones and Reni Potrebenko, Shooting Stars; Pierre Ouellet and Michael Edward Jackson, Earth's Magnetic Field	Micky Erbe and Maribeth Solomon, Adderly: "Midnight in Morocco"; Neil Chotem, Chasing Rainbows; Micky Erbe and Maribeth Solomon, Mount Royal
Music composition for a program	Technical achievement
David Foster, David Foster: The Symphony Sessions; Paul Hoffert, Hoover vs. The Kennedys; Louis Natale, The Ray Bradbury Theatre	ARCCA Animation, Captain Power and the Soldiers of the Future

=== Special awards ===
- Earle Grey Award: Kate Reid
- Multiculturalism Award: Degrassi Junior High
- TV Guide Most Popular Program Award: Night Heat
- John Drainie Award: Davidson Dunton
- Margaret Collier Award: M. Charles Cohen
