= Patricia Hamilton =

Canadian actress (1937–2023)

- Born: Patricia Ruth Hamilton; 27 April 1937; Regina, Saskatchewan, Canada
- Died: 30 April 2023 (aged 86); Stratford, Ontario, Canada
- Education: Carnegie Institute of Technology; Royal Central School of Speech and Drama
- Occupations: Actress, voice artist
- Years active: 1960–2008
- Spouse: Leslie Carlson (m. 1967, divorced)
- Family: Ben Carlson (son)

Patricia Ruth Hamilton (27 April 1937 – 30 April 2023) was a Canadian actress who had an active career on stage, television, and film from the 1960s through the 2010s. She had a lengthy association as a stage actress with the Tarragon Theatre with whom she appeared in multiple world premieres of works by Canadian playwrights; including Judith Thompson's I Am Yours (1987) for which she won a Dora Mavor Moore Award in 1988. She also appeared as a guest actress at other theaters in Canada and internationally including the American Shakespeare Theatre, the Stratford Festival, the Edinburgh International Festival, and The Old Vic.

Hamilton was best known for her portrayal of Rachel Lynde in several screen adaptations of works by Lucy Maud Montgomery. These include the television mini-series Anne of Green Gables, its sequels: as Anne of Green Gables: The Sequel, Anne of Green Gables: The Continuing Story, and Anne of Green Gables: A New Beginning. She also portrayed Lynde in the television series Road to Avonlea; a performance for which she was nominated for a Gemini Award for Best Performance by an Actress in a Supporting Role in a Dramatic Series three times, winning in 1996. She also was the voice of Rachel Lynde in the PBS animated series Anne of Green Gables.

In addition to her work as an actress, Hamilton taught on the faculties of the University of Calgary's Banff Centre for the Arts and George Brown College.

== Life and career ==
Patricia Hamilton was born on 27 April 1937 in Regina, Saskatchewan. Her father, James Hamilton, was a lawyer, and her mother, Florence Hamilton (née Stuart), was a nurse. She was trained as an actor at Pittsburgh's Carnegie Institute of Technology (now Carnegie Mellon University), and began her career as a stage actress in the United States. She later went to London to pursue further studies in drama at the Royal Central School of Speech and Drama.

While working as an actress in the United States in the 1960s, Hamilton began a romantic relationship with the actor Les Carlson. In 1966 the couple moved to Toronto, and they were married in 1967. Their marriage ended in divorce when their son, the actor Ben Carlson, was two years old.

In 1971 Hamilton performed in the inaugural season of the Tarragon Theatre. She maintained a long association with that theatre that lasted for decades. She appeared in several world premieres at the Tarragon Theatre, including Judith Thompson's I Am Yours (1987), Joan MacLeod's Amigo's Blue Guitar (1990), Michel Tremblay's Impromptu on Nun's Island (2002) and David Gow's Bea's Niece (2005). Some of the other highlights of her work at that theatre include performances in Jack Cunningham's See No Evil, Hear No Evil (1972), Tremblay's Forever Yours, Marie-Lou (1972]), David Freeman's Battering Ram (1973), Joanna Glass's Artichoke (1976), Lillian Hellman's Toys in the Attic (1978), Margaret Hollingsworth's Mother County (1980), and Tremblay's Albertine in Five Times (1985) among other works.

In November 2008, Hamilton starred in the Harold Green Jewish Theatre production of Kindertransport in Toronto.

== Death ==
Hamilton died of undisclosed causes at a nursing home in Stratford, Ontario, three days after her 86th birthday.

== Filmography ==
Year	Title	Role	Notes
1972	The House Without a Christmas Tree	Narrator (uncredited)	TV movie
1973	Purple Playhouse		Episode: "Ticket-of-Leave Man"
1973	CBC Drama '73	Mrs. MacLeod	Episode: "A Bird in the House"
1973	Dr. Simon Locke	Marian	Episode: "Dark Pages"
1973	The Thanksgiving Treasure	Narrator - Addie as an adult	TV movie
1974	The ABC Afternoon Playbreak	Rebecca Glover	Episode: "Last Bride of Salem"
1974	Why Rock the Boat?	Hilda	
1975	Lucy Maud Montgomery - The Road to Green Gables	Marilla	TV movie
1975	Performance		Episode: "The Captain of Kopenick"
1976	Goldenrod	Mrs. Gunderson	
1977	Who Has Seen the Wind	Miss MacDonald	
1980	Middle Age Crazy	Barbara Pickett	
1981	My Bloody Valentine	Mabel Osborne	
1983	Hangin' In	Mrs. Holitski	Episode: "The Hero"
1984	When We First Met		TV movie
1984	Heartsounds	Flo	TV movie
1985	Love and Larceny	Florida G. Blythe	TV movie
1985	Night Heat	Millie	Episode: "Crossfire"
1985	The Last Polka	Mrs. Vicki Mahoney-Cohen	TV movie
1985	Anne of Green Gables	Rachel Lynde	TV movie
1986	Connection		
1986	The Lawrenceville Stories	Mrs. Conover	Miniseries
1987	American Playhouse	Mrs. Conover	Episode: "The Prodigious Hickey"
1987	Really Weird Tales	Assessor	TV movie
1987	Alfred Hitchcock Presents	Mrs. Greysome	Episode: "The Impatient Patient"
1987	Fight for Life		TV movie
1987	Airwaves	Kate	Episode: "A Second Look"
1987	Anne of Avonlea	Rachel Lynde	TV movie
1987	Echoes in the Darkness	Dorothy Hunsberger	TV movie
1987	Friday the 13th	Sadie King	Episode: "Shadow Boxer"
1988	Blades of Courage	Anna Petrie	TV movie
1988	Chasing Rainbows	Miss Kidd	Miniseries
1988	Check It Out!	Mrs. Kelbo	Episode: "My Hero, Mr. Bannister"
1988	The Christmas Wife	Dora	TV movie
1988	Screwball Hotel	Chastity	
1990	Street Legal	Grace Whitney	Episode: "Security Exchange"
1990	In Defense of a Married Man	Eileen Lloyd	TV movie
1990–1996	Road to Avonlea	Rachel Lynde	30 episodes
1996	Holiday Affair	Susan Ennis	TV movie
1997	When Secrets Kill	Eliza Emery	TV movie
1998	Traders	Ambassador	Episode: "Boom"
1998	An Avonlea Christmas	Rachel Lynde	TV movie
2000	Anne of Green Gables: The Continuing Story	Rachel Lynde	TV movie
2000–2001	Anne of Green Gables: The Animated Series	Rachel Lynde	
2005	Anne: Journey to Green Gables	Rachel Lynde	Video
2008	Anne of Green Gables: A New Beginning	Rachel Lynde	TV movie
2008	A Miser Brothers' Christmas	Mother Nature (voice)	TV special; (Final role)
