= Henry Ramer =

Canadian actor

Henry Conrad Ramer (April 29, 1924 – August 11, 2009) was a Canadian actor. He was most noted for his supporting performance as Jerry Dingleman in The Apprenticeship of Duddy Kravitz, for which he received an ACTRA Award nomination for Best Film Actor at the 4th ACTRA Awards in 1975.

Born in Chernivtsi (Romanian: Cernăuți) when it was still Romanian territory, he moved with his family to Montreal, Quebec, in childhood. He made his acting debut as a teenager in a stage production of The Cherry Orchard. He attempted to enlist in the Royal Canadian Air Force during World War II, but after being turned down he devoted himself more actively to acting, and was soon hired as a staff announcer and radio actor for CBC Radio.

In 1951, he made his first film appearance in The Butler's Night Off, a film which also marked the debut of William Shatner. He frequently appeared in CBC Television drama anthologies through the 1950s and 1960s, and frequently did voice-over roles in animation, television commercials and narration. Despite not actually being a fluent speaker of the French language, he was also skilled enough in phonetically reading French-language dialogue in a native-sounding accent that he was frequently given French dubbing roles. He also continued to have stage roles, most notably as Tiger Brown in a 1972 production of The Threepenny Opera at the Stratford Festival alongside Jack Creley, Anton Rodgers and Lila Kedrova.

In addition to his ACTRA nomination for Duddy Kravitz, he also received nominations for Best Television Actor at the 2nd ACTRA Awards in 1973 for Here Come the Seventies, and Best Radio Actor at the 9th ACTRA Awards in 1980 for Grasshopper Hill.

== Filmography ==
Year	Title	Role	Notes
1951	The Butler's Night Off		
1955	First Performance	Luhan	Episode "Montserrat"
1956	Folio	Narrator	Episode "The Trial"
1957	Eyewitness No. 98	Narrator	
1960	R.C.M.P.	George McKendrick	One episode
1960	General Motors Theatre	Stan	Episode "Blue Is for Boys"
1960	La Côte de Sable	Ken	
1960-64	Shoestring Theatre	Various	Nine episodes
1961	Robert Baldwin: A Matter of Principle	Francis Hincks	
1961	William Lyon Mackenzie: A Friend to His Country	Francis Hincks	
1963	Playdate	Charles Napier	Episode "A Suitable Case for Treatment"
1964	A Very Close Family	Charlie	
1964-68	Festival		Episodes "The Magician of Lublin", "The True Bleeding Heart of Martin B.", "The Write-Off"
1965	The Fasting Friar		Four episodes
1965	The Powers of Darkness	Dietrich	
1966	The Marvel Super Heroes	Mandarin,> Major Uberhart, Melter, Doctor Doom, Wolfgang, Vashti, Sando / Colonel Kranz	
1967	Spider-Man	Henry Smythe, Dr. Noah Boddy, Grandini the Mystic, Lee Patterson, Mr. Flintridge	
1969	Change of Mind	Chief Enfield	
1969	Adventures in Rainbow Country	Ralph Walters	One episode
1970	McQueen	Hillyer	One episode
1972	Another Smith for Paradise	Harold "Smitty" Smith	
1973	Delilah		One episode
1974	The Apprenticeship of Duddy Kravitz	Jerry Dingleman	
1974	Why Rock the Boat?	Club president	
1974	Witness to Yesterday	Al Capone	
1975	It Seemed Like a Good Idea at the Time	Prince	
1975	My Pleasure Is My Business	His Excellency	
1976	Noah's Animals	Noah	
1976	The Spirit of Independence	Grizzly	
1977	J.A. Martin Photographer (J.A. Martin photographe)	Scott	
1977	Welcome to Blood City	Chumley	
1977	Custard Pie		One episode
1977	Spinnolio	Narrator	
1977	Starship Invasions	Malcolm	
1977	Language and Canadian Citizenship	Narrator	
1977	The Little Brown Burro		
1978	In Praise of Older Women	Narrator	
1979	A Gift to Last	Timothy Eaton	One episode
1980	Cordélia	Det. McCasill	
1980	The Dream Never Dies	Narrator	
1980	Virus	TV Narrator	
1981	B.C.: A Special Christmas	Thor	
1983	Between Friends	Sam Tucker	
1983	Cover Girl	Klaus Kringelein	
1983	The Old Lady's Camping Trip		
1984	Reno and the Doc	Doc	
1984	Hockey Night	Bill Moss	
1985	Final Offer	Narrator	
1985	Reckless Disregard	Jack Coburn	
1986	Hangin' In	Lou	One episode
1986	Night Heat	McShane	One episode
1986	Loose Ends	Dadapopoulos	
1986	Doing Life	Edelbaum	
1987	Seeing Things	Charles Foster Klein	One episode
1988	Mount Royal	Duncan Elliott	One episode
1988	Friday the 13th: The Series	Radio announcer	One episode
1988	Family Reunion	Sam	
1988	The King Chronicle		One episode
1989	Passion and Paradise	Lt. Charles Haffenden	
1991	The Big Slice	Max Bernstein	
1991	Tropical Heat	Michael Trask	One episode
1991	Diplomatic Immunity	Smith Reynolds	
1992	Terror on Track 9	Finkel	
1992-93	Street Legal	Ronald Shackleton	Three episodes
1994	And Then There Was One	Roxy's dad	
1994	Sodbusters	Governor	
1995	Screamers	Narrator	
1995-97	Jake and the Kid	Adult Ben (narrator)	
1996	We the Jury		
1997	Shipwreck: The Floating Inferno	Narrator	
1998	Jewels II: The Ultimate Challenge	Professor Bhandam	
1999	M.U.G.E.N		
1999	Mythic Warriors: Guardians of the Legend	Emperor	
