= Richard McMillan =

Canadian actor

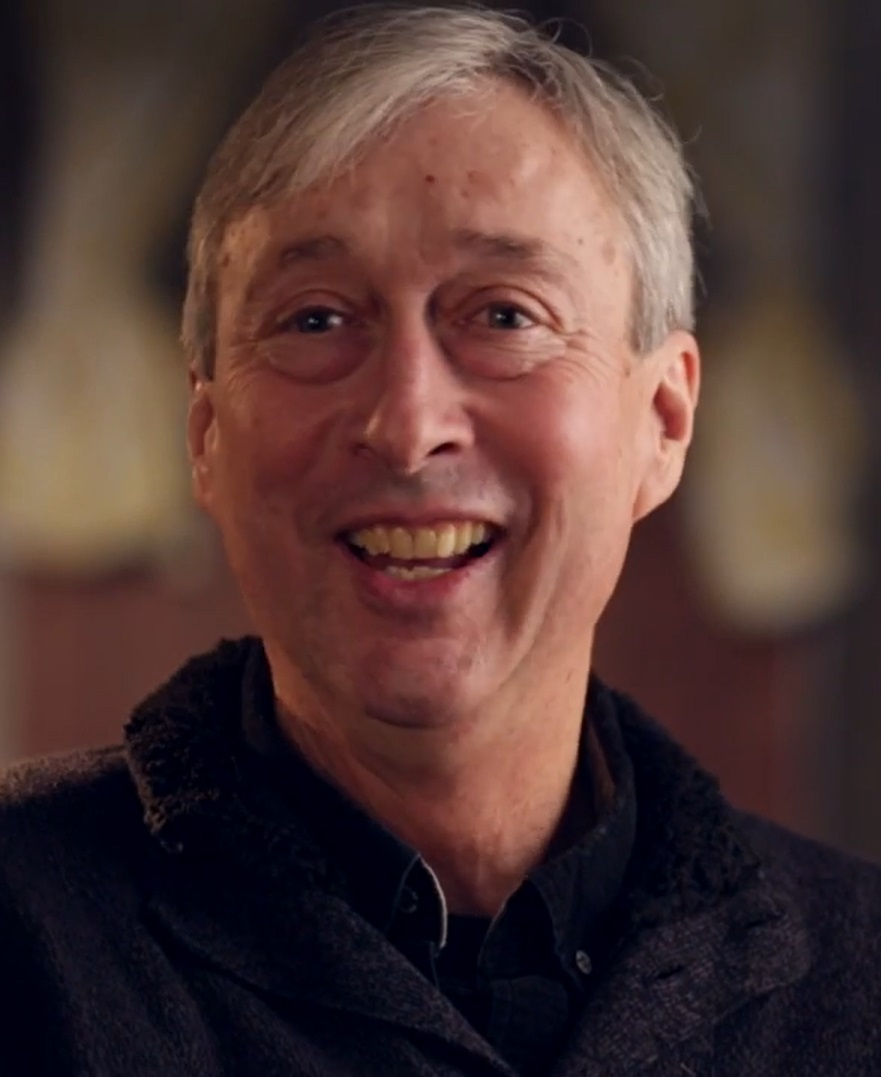
- McMillan in 2014
- Born: Richard John Lawrence McMillan; 20 March 1951; Beaverton, Ontario, Canada
- Died: 19 February 2017 (aged 65); Toronto, Ontario. Canada
- Other name: Richard MacMillan
- Occupation: Actor
- Years active: 1977–2014
- Known for: Best known as Pooh-Bah in the Stratford Festival production of The Mikado (1982–1984).

Richard McMillan (also known as Richard MacMillan; 20 March 1951 – 19 February 2017) was a Canadian film, television and stage actor.

== Early life ==
McMillan was born in Beaverton, Ontario, Canada on 20 March 1951 and, as an infant, was adopted by Frank and Mary McMillan. His parents ran the Beaverton Hotel, and provided McMillan and his younger brother, Frank ("Cooch"), a worthy home and surroundings in which to grow up as youngsters. Later in life, McMillan met his biological mother who refused to acknowledge him as her child, which was profoundly felt, and influenced his onstage performances, according to his actress/wife, Anne Louise Bannon. After high school, McMillan moved to Toronto and studied theater at Ryerson University but did not graduate, and instead, soon afterwards, joined the Stratford Festival as a young actor.

== Career ==
In 1982, McMillan became well known for his role as Pooh-Bah ("Lord High Everything Else") in an adaptation, by Brian MacDonald, of the Gilbert and Sullivan operetta, The Mikado. In the 1980s and 1990s, McMillan was a well regarded Shakespearean actor at the Three Rivers Shakespeare Festival hosted by the University of Pittsburgh, as well as an actor in other related stage productions in and around Pittsburgh, Pennsylvania, United States. In 1989, while there, McMillan met his wife, Anne, then a graduate student at the University, who was playing Ophelia to his Hamlet on stage. They married in 1991, in her hometown of Windsor, Ontario, and afterwards, in 1993, the couple had a daughter Maggie.

During this time, McMillan also performed in stage productions in and around Toronto, which included a featured role in Inexpressible Island, a three-act dramatic play by David Young, in 1997. In 2000, McMillan performed as Scar in the Canadian production of The Lion King, a duplicate of the Broadway version, at the Princess of Wales Theatre in Toronto. In addition, McMillan later played the wizard Saruman in a production of Lord of the Rings. Between performances, McMillan enjoyed painting, playing the piano, kayaking, and, having earned a private pilot's license, flying.

Over the years, McMillan was awarded honors for his acting performances. These honors included several Dora Mavor Moore Awards, a Canadian Screen Award and a Toronto Theatre Critics Award.

According to Richard Rose, artistic director of the Tarragon Theatre in Toronto, and a close personal friend of McMillan, "In the roles he took on, he was noted for presenting fiercely passionate characters that he illuminated with compassion and, conversely, he was a master of the clown — roles that were at once humorous and sad ... As an actor he understood the absurd and the contradictory. I don’t think I have ever seen anyone quite that sad on the stage, and for that the audiences just loved him. You couldn’t take your eyes off him."

McMillan was diagnosed with thyroid cancer in 2009 and after a remission later died of the disease on 19 February 2017 in Toronto at Princess Margaret Hospital at the age of 65.

== Filmography ==
=== Films (selected) ===
Year	Title	Role	Notes
1983	The Mikado	Pooh-Bah	
1983	The Wars	Harris	
1988	Family Reunion	Desk Clerk	
1993	M. Butterfly	Embassy Colleague	
1994	Trapped in Paradise	Agent No. 1	
1995	The Michelle Apartments	Ernie	
1996	The Legend of Gator Face	Skeeter	
1998	Shadow Builder	Father Finler	
1998	Babyface	Leo	
1998	All I Wanna Do	Bert Chubb	
1998	Sleeping Dogs Lie	Rainville	
1999	A Map of the World	Lloyd	
1999	External Affairs	Ilya Trefonich	
1999	New Blood	Young	
2004	Slow Jam King	Buck Garvey's security	
2004	The Day After Tomorrow	Dennis	
2004	Zeyda and the Hitman	Superintendent	
2004	A Different Loyalty	Angus Petherbridge	
2004	Cube Zero	Bartok	
2006	The Fountain	Henry	
2012	Please Kill Mr. Know It All	Actor No. 4	
2014	How to Build a Better Boy	Principal Fragner	

== See also ==
- List of Canadian actors
