= David Eisner (actor) =

Canadian actor

- Born: March 3, 1958 (age 68)
- Other name: David S. Eisner
- Occupation: Actor
- Years active: 1979–Present

David Eisner (born March 3, 1958) is a Canadian actor. Best known for his recurring television role in King of Kensington and his regular roles in Hangin' In and Blue Murder, he is co-director with Avery Saltzman of the Harold Green Jewish Theatre Company in Toronto.

== Career ==
Eisner is a two-time Gemini Award nominee for Best Actor in a Comedy Series for Hangin' In, at the 1st Gemini Awards in 1986 and the 2nd Gemini Awards in 1987. In 2005, he played Henry Morgentaler in the controversial CTV television movie Choice.

His other credits have included guest appearances in Highway to Heaven (1986), Counterstrike (1993), Due South (1994), Forever Knight (1995), Total Recall 2070 (1999), Traders (1999), Earth: Final Conflict (2002), This Is Wonderland (2006), The Line, Remedy (2015), Living in Your Car (2010), and the CBC Radio drama series Rumours and Boarders. His film appearances include Running (1979), Phobia (1980), Happy Birthday to Me (1981), A New Life (1988), This Is My Life (1992), Trial by Jury (1994), Time to Say Goodbye? (1997), Good Will Hunting (1997), Steal This Movie! (2000) and Bless the Child (2000).

Eisner and Saltzman founded the Harold Green Jewish Theatre in 2007. With the company, he has acted in productions of David Ives' New Jerusalem and Alfred Uhry's Driving Miss Daisy.

== Filmography ==
=== Film ===
David Eisner film credits
Year	Title	Role	Notes
1979	Running	Man	
1980	Phobia	Johnny Venuti	
1981	Happy Birthday to Me	Rudi	
1988	A New Life	Billy	
1988	Family Reunion	Benjie	
1992	This Is My Life	Oliver	
1994	Trial by Jury	Melman	
1995	Butterbox Babies	Mr. Kellerman	
1996	Extreme Measures	Guy's Lawyer	
1997	Good Will Hunting	Executive #3	
1999	Judgment Day: The Ellie Nesler Story	Inmate Advocate	
2000	Steal This Movie!	William Kunstler	
2000	Bless the Child	Dr. Ben	
2004	Taking Lives	Committee Head	
2005	Left Behind III: World at War	Allan Campbell	
2019	Run This Town	Phil	

=== Television ===
David Eisner television credits
Year	Title	Role	Notes
1977–1979	King of Kensington	Guido / Wally	9 episodes
1979	The Littlest Hobo	Sly	Episode: "Stand In"
1981–1987	Hangin' In	Michael Difalco	110 episodes
1984	Samson and Delilah	Arin	Television film (as David S. Eisner)
1986	Highway to Heaven	Todd Worton	Episode: "Sail Away"
1988	T. and T.	Doctor	Episode: "Playing with Fire"
1988	Family Reunion	Benji	Television film
1988	Alfred Hitchcock Presents	Gordon Blake	Episode: "Kandinsky's Vault"
1991–1993	Street Legal	Various roles	3 episodes
1992	To Catch a Killer	Williams	2 episodes
1993	Counterstrike	Stan Moore	Episode: "Betrayed"
1993	Woman on Trial: The Lawrencia Bembenek Story	Ron Lester	Television film
1994	Due South	Dr. Howard	Episode: "Diefenbaker's Day Off"
1995	Forever Knight	Fred Berman	Episode: "The Fix"
1995	Almost Golden: The Jessica Savitch Story	Floor manager	Television film
1995	Cagney & Lacey: The View Through the Glass Ceiling	Paul Bustany	Television film
1995	Shock Treatment	Jake's Dad	Television film
1997	Let Me Call You Sweetheart	Barney Haskell	Television film
1997	Time to Say Goodbye?	Justis	Television film
1998	The Last Don II	Frankie's Lawyer	Episode #1.1
1998	Rescuers: Stories of Courage: Two Couples	Brecht	Television film
1999	Total Recall 2070	Vereen	Episode: "Rough Whimper of Insanity"
1999	Ricky Nelson: Original Teen Idol	Dan Cohen	Television film
1999	Twice in a Lifetime	Dr. Dan Brickner	Episode: "Healing Touch"
1999	Psi Factor	Sidney Fineman	Episode: "Once Upon a Time in the West"
2001	Jackie, Ethel, Joan: The Women of Camelot	Schiff	Television film
2001	The Familiar Stranger	Robert Becker	Television film
2001	Chasing Cain	Lloyd	Television film
2001	Soul Food	Norman Spicer	Episode: "Sex and Money"
2001	Jenifer	Impatient Passenger	Television film
2001–2004	Blue Murder	Dr. Brian Lukowich	39 episodes
2002	The 5th Quadrant	Roy Sullivan	Episode: "Wild Animal King/Divining Miss M"
2002	Two Against Time	Dr. Cooper	Television film
2002	Earth: Final Conflict	Hybrid	Episode: "Street Wise"
2002	Martin and Lewis	Lew Wasserman	Television film
2003	Odyssey 5	Dr. Hammond	Episode: "Follow the Leader"
2003	Jasper, Texas	Mike Bradford	Television film
2004	Doc	Coach Monahan	Episode: "No Pain, No Gain"
2005	Choice: The Henry Morgentaler Story	Henry Morgentaler	Television film
2005	Confessions of an American Bride	Rabbi Kaplan	Television film
2005	Swarmed	David Orsow	Television film
2006	Covert One: The Hades Factor	Professor Allen Carey	2 episodes
2006	The State Within	Sam Levinson	4 episodes
2008	Will You Merry Me?	Marvin Fine	Television film
2009	The Line	Therapist	2 episodes
2010	Living in Your Car	Dr. Stan Minksy	Episode #1.7
2011	Flashpoint	Adrian Hayes	Episode: "Collateral Damage"
2011	Three Inches	Track Suit	Television film
2012	Titanic	Benjamin Guggenheim	3 episodes
2012	King	Dr. Stanton	Episode: "Freddy Boise"
2015	Remedy	Dr. Graeme Kane	Episode: "Life in Technicolour"
2016	Saving Hope	Dr. Stroman	Episode: "Not Fade Away"
2019	Suits	Board Member	Episode: "Harvey"
2020	Mrs. America	Martin Abzug	2 episodes
2021	See	Ambassador Scopus	Episode: "The Truth About Unicorns"
2023	Less Than Kosher	Rabbi Morris	6 episodes
