= The Boys on the Bus (film) =

1987 Canadian documentary film

- Directed by: Bob McKeown
- Produced by: Bob McKeown
- Narrated by: Kevin Lowe
- Cinematography: Michael Boland
- Music by: Terry McKeown
- Production company: McKeown-McGee Films
- Release date: October 19, 1987
- Running time: 90 minutes
- Country: Canada
- Language: English

The Boys on the Bus is a Canadian documentary film, directed by Bob McKeown and released in 1987. The film is a portrait of the Edmonton Oilers in their late 1980s NHL playoff runs, featuring both on-ice footage and a behind the scenes portrait of the team members.

The film was originally shot during the 1985-86 NHL season; however, after the Oilers were eliminated from the 1986 Stanley Cup playoffs by the Calgary Flames in the division finals, McKeown opted to return during the 1986-87 NHL season to shoot additional material, culminating in the Oilers winning the 1987 Stanley Cup Finals.

The film premiered theatrically in Edmonton on October 19, 1987, and had a further theatrical run, before being broadcast on CBC Television on May 17, 1988 at the outset of the team's return to the 1988 Stanley Cup Finals.

== Legacy ==
The Boys Are Back, a sequel film following the Oilers in the 1988-89 NHL season after star player Wayne Gretzky was traded to the Los Angeles Kings, was released in 1989.

The film has remained influential for its pioneering status as one of the first sports documentaries ever to provide a behind the scenes view of its subjects rather than focusing solely on in-game performance and interviews. It was directly cited as an influence by the producers of the 2020 basketball documentary miniseries The Last Dance, as well as being cited by former Oiler Mark Messier as one of the inspirations behind the creation of the 2024 sports documentary series Game Seven.

The film was rebroadcast by the NHL Network in 2017.

== Awards ==
Award	Date of ceremony	Category	Nominees	Result	Ref.
Gemini Awards	1988	Best Sports Program or Series	Bob McKeown	Won	
Gemini Awards	1988	Best Direction in an Information or Documentary Program or Series	Bob McKeown	Won	
