= John Boylan (Canadian actor) =

Canadian actor

- Education: National Theatre School of Canada
- Occupations: Actor, drama teacher
- Years active: 1974-present

John Boylan is a Canadian film and television actor, recently best known for his supporting roles as Gary Strange in Being Erica, Deputy Police Chief Talbot in Blue Murder and Bishop Richard Cushing in The Kennedys.

== Early life ==
Boylan attended the National Theatre School of Canada.

== Career ==
He has also appeared in the television series The Hitchhiker, Road to Avonlea, Side Effects, North of 60, Earth: Final Conflict, The City, Instant Star, The Newsroom and Queer as Folk, and the films Clearcut, An Adventure for Two, To Catch a Killer, Time to Say Goodbye? and The Path to 9/11.

=== Other work ===
Boylan works primarily as an acting teacher at Toronto, Ontario's Centre for the Arts, and has also taught acting at Ryerson University (now Toronto Metropolitan University), George Brown College, New York University, the University of Minnesota, the Yale School of Drama and York University.

He is the founder and Director of Toronto's Centre for the Arts. A graduate of Canada's National Theatre School, recent film and television credits include The Story of Luke, The Don Cherry Story, The Kennedys, and Servitude.

== Filmography ==
=== Film ===
| Year | Title | Role |
|---|---|---|
| 1974 | Alien Thunder | Cpl. Harold Bellringer |
| 1977 | Rabid | Young Cop In Plaza |
| 1978 | Blood Relatives | Policeman #3 |
| 1978 | Angela | Sean |
| 1978 | Two Solitudes | Sailor |
| 1979 | An Adventure for Two | Highway Patrol |
| 1983 | The Prodigal | Alex Thornhill |
| 1989 | Jacknife | Frank; Physical Education Teacher |
| 1989 | The Journey Home | Mr. Munroe |
| 1997 | Time to Say Goodbye? | Dr. Peters |
| 2000 | The Perfect Son | Minister |
| 2003 | The Limit | Detective Lavery |
| 2004 | Harold & Kumar Get the Munchies | Officer Brucks |
| 2005 | The Perfect Catch | Myerson |
| 2007 | The Rocket Man | Carl |
| 2009 | Land of the Lost | Enik |
| 2010 | In the Dominican | Carl Len |
| 2011 | Servitude | Sam Stein |
| 2012 | The Story of Luke | Mr. Harrison |

=== Television ===
| Year | Title | Role | Notes |
|---|---|---|---|
| 1979 | The Spirit of Adventure: Night Flight | Co-Pilot | TV movie |
| 1989 | Deadly Nightmares | Martin | Hootch |
| 1995 | The Great Defender | Judge Emerson | Episode: "Naked Truth" |
| 1998 | Side Effects | Robert Mathias | Episode: "Easy Breathing" |
| 1997 | North of 60 | Staff Sgt. Ernie Jerome | Episode: "Walking with Ghosts" |
| 2001 | Leap Years | Stacey Stewart Curtis | |
| 2001 | The Associates | Jake Rothstein | |
| 2002-2003 | Blue Murder | Deputy Chief of Police Talbot | |
| 2007 | Love You to Death | Charles | Episode: "Storage Unit Murder" |
| 2007 | The Dresden Files | Dr. Overland | Episode: "The Other Dick" |
| 2009 | Before You Say 'I Do' | Mr. Johnson | TV movie |
| 2009-2011 | Being Erica | Gary Strange | |
| 2010 | The Bridge | Munson | Episode: "The Unguarded Moment" |
| 2010 | Keep Your Head Up, Kid: The Don Cherry Story | CBC Executive #1 | Episode: "Part 2" |
| 2011 | The Kennedys | Bishop Richard Cushing | Episode: "Joe's Revenge" |
| 2012 | Witchslayer Gretl | Lara's Father | TV movie |
| 2012 | Wrath of Grapes: The Don Cherry Story II | | Episode: "Night 2" |
| 2012 | Alphas | Warden Phillips | Episode: "Wake Up Call" |
| 2017 | Running With Violet | Gary | 5 episodes |
