= And Then You Die (film) =

1987 Canadian TV movie

- Genre: Drama
- Written by: Alun Hibbert; Wayne Grigsby
- Directed by: Francis Mankiewicz
- Starring: Kenneth Welsh; R. H. Thomson; Wayne Robson
- Theme music composer: Marty Simon
- Country of origin: Canada
- Original language: English

Production
- Producers: Bernard Zukerman; Brian McKenna
- Cinematography: Richard Leiterman

Original release
- Network: CBC
- Release: November 8, 1987

And Then You Die is a Canadian crime drama television film, directed by Francis Mankiewicz and broadcast by CBC Television in 1987. The film stars Kenneth Welsh as Eddie Griffin, an Irish Canadian drug dealer in Montreal, Quebec whose criminal network is facing upheaval after the murder of the city's main Mafia boss.

The cast also includes R. H. Thomson as James McGrath, the police detective investigating the city's organized crime networks and trying to bring Griffin and his colleagues to justice, and Wayne Robson as Wally Degan, Griffin's right-hand man, as well as Graeme Campbell, Dennis O'Connor, Tom McCamus, Pierre Chagnon, Guy Thauvette, Maggie Huculak, Donald Davis, Tom Harvey and Alpha Boucher in supporting roles.

The film was shot in fall 1986 in Montreal. It was originally planned for broadcast in spring 1987, but was delayed to the fall by post-production issues.

It was screened in the Perspectives Canada program at the 1987 Festival of Festivals, prior to its television broadcast on November 8, 1987.

== Awards ==
Award	Date of ceremony	Category	Nominees	Result	Ref.
Gemini Awards	1988	Best Television Movie or Miniseries	Bernard Zukerman, Brian McKenna	Nominated	
Gemini Awards	1988	Best Actor in a Dramatic Program or Miniseries	R. H. Thomson	Nominated	
Gemini Awards	1988	Best Actor in a Dramatic Program or Miniseries	Kenneth Welsh	Won	
Gemini Awards	1988	Best Supporting Actor in a Dramatic Program or Miniseries	Wayne Robson	Won	
Gemini Awards	1988	Best Direction in a Dramatic Program or Miniseries	Francis Mankiewicz	Nominated	
Gemini Awards	1988	Best Writing in a Dramatic Program or Miniseries	Alun Hibbert, Wayne Grigsby	Nominated	
Gemini Awards	1988	Best Sound in a Dramatic Program or Series	Gerry King, Austin Grimaldi, Dino Pigat, Kevin Townsend	Nominated	
