= Reckless Disregard =

- Film poster
- Directed by: Harvey Hart
- Written by: Charles S. Haas
- Starring: Tess Harper; Leslie Nielsen; Ronny Cox; Henry Ramer; Kate Lynch; Sean McCann
- Cinematography: René Verzier
- Edited by: Tony Lower
- Music by: Gil Goldstein
- Production company: Telecom Entertainment Inc.
- Distributed by: Showtime
- Release date: March 17, 1985
- Running time: 120 minutes
- Country: United States
- Language: English

Reckless Disregard is a 1985 American film that was directed by Harvey Hart. It stars Tess Harper as a lawyer that must defend a physician against claims of selling prescriptions. After accepting the part Harper commented that the role was different from those she'd played in the past such as "rural mothers". The film has drawn comparisons to the 1983 Galloway lawsuit against Dan Rather as well as the case of Westmoreland vs. CBS.

== Synopsis ==
Meredith Craig is a small-time lawyer that must defend Edward Lucas, a physician whose practice was ruined after a television show claimed that he sold illegal drug prescriptions. Edward wants Meredith to sue the show, stating that its host Bob Franklin was guilty of libel, as Edward claims innocence.

== Cast ==
- Tess Harper as Meredith Craig
- Frank Adamson as Dr. Edward Lucas
- Leslie Nielsen as Bob Franklin
- Ronny Cox as Dan Leone
- Henry Ramer as Jack Coburn
- Kate Lynch as Lauren Gartner
- Sean McCann as Harold Stern

== Reception ==
The Los Angeles Times reviewed the film and drew parallels to the 1983 Galloway lawsuit against Dan Rather. The New York Times made similar comments, stating that "The way reality has been rendered into fiction with ''Reckless Disregard'' illustrates how film makers try to heighten drama by sharpening and simplifying murky issues." People panned the film, writing that "In the wake of Westmoreland vs. CBS, there's a compelling movie to be made about how TV news works, how the producers do all the work and the anchors get all the credit, how interviews are edited, how news and entertainment merge on TV. But this isn't that movie."
