= Family Reunion (1988 film) =

1988 Canadian TV movie

- Genre: Drama
- Written by: Avrum Jacobson
- Directed by: Vic Sarin
- Starring: David Eisner; Rebecca Jenkins; Paul Soles; Linda Sorenson; Henry Beckman
- Theme music composer: Fred Mollin
- Country of origin: Canada
- Original language: English

Production
- Producer: Robert Sherrin
- Cinematography: Vic Sarin
- Editor: Gordon McClellan
- Running time: 97 minutes

Original release
- Network: CBC
- Release: January 10, 1988

Family Reunion is a Canadian romantic comedy television film, directed by Vic Sarin and broadcast by CBC Television in 1988. The film stars David Eisner as Benji, a shy Jewish inventor whose fiancée Goldie (Stevie Vallance) calls off their engagement just hours before they are set to fly to Toronto for the 75th birthday party of his grandfather Leo (Henry Beckman), only to become drawn into a potential new relationship with Caitlin (Rebecca Jenkins), a woman he meets on the plane whom his family mistake for Goldie at the airport.

The cast also includes Paul Soles and Linda Sorenson as Benji's parents Morris and Bea, as well as Henry Ramer, Patricia Phillips, Billy Van, Richard McMillan, Frank Moore and Keith Knight in supporting roles.

The film was shot in Toronto and Muskoka in summer 1987, and was broadcast by CBC Television on January 10, 1988.

== Awards ==
Award	Date of ceremony	Category	Nominees	Result	Ref.
Gemini Awards	1988	Best Television Movie or Miniseries	Robert Sherrin	Nominated	
Gemini Awards	1988	Best Actress in a Dramatic Program or Miniseries	Rebecca Jenkins	Nominated	
Gemini Awards	1988	Best Supporting Actor in a Dramatic Program or Miniseries	Henry Beckman	Nominated	
Gemini Awards	1988	Best Direction in a Dramatic Program or Miniseries	Vic Sarin	Nominated	
Gemini Awards	1988	Best Writing in a Dramatic Program or Miniseries	Avrum Jacobson	Won	
Gemini Awards	1988	Best Costume Design	Pamela Woodward Conner	Nominated	
