= The Journey Home (1989 film) =

1989 Canadian short film

- Directed by: Marc F. Voizard
- Written by: Erna Buffie
- Produced by: Mary Armstrong; Sally Bochner
- Starring: John Boylan; Geraldine Farrell; Jessalyn Gilsig
- Cinematography: Rodney Gibbons
- Edited by: Jean Beaudoin
- Music by: Peter Measroch
- Production company: National Film Board of Canada
- Release date: 1989
- Running time: 28 minutes
- Country: Canada
- Language: English

The Journey Home is a Canadian drama short film, directed by Marc F. Voizard and released in 1989. The film stars Jessalyn Gilsig as Jeannie Munroe, a teenage girl who learns an important lesson about the difficulties of adulthood after her father (John Boylan) loses his job.

The cast also includes Geraldine Farrell, Ian Finlay, Dean Hagopian, Terra Maria, Sandra Oh, Philip Spensley and Gordon Michael Woolvett.

The film premiered at the 1989 Montreal World Film Festival.

The film was a Genie Award nominee for Best Live Action Short Drama at the 11th Genie Awards in 1990.
