= Rosemary Dunsmore =

Canadian TV, film, and theatre actress

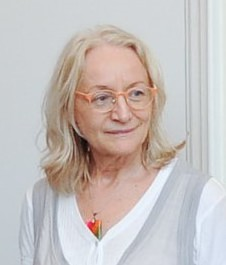
- Rosemary Dunsmore in August 2014
- Born: July 13, 1952 (age 73); Edmonton, Alberta, Canada
- Occupation: Actress
- Years active: 1980 – present

Rosemary Dunsmore (born July 13, 1952) is a Canadian TV, film, and theatre actress, director, and educator. She was awarded a Dora Mavor Moore Award for her 1982 performance in Straight Ahead/Blind Dancers. In 2009 she won the ACTRA Award for Best Actress for her performance in the film The Baby Formula. She has starred in some well-known Canadian productions, including The Campbells, Anne of Green Gables: The Sequel, Road to Avonlea, Mom P.I., Murdoch Mysteries and Orphan Black.

== Life and career ==
Born on July 13, 1952, in Edmonton, Alberta, Canada, Dunsmore was trained in drama at York University from which she graduated in 1973. She began her professional career in 1975 touring in Cedric Smith and George Luscombe's play Ten Lost Years. She soon appeared in productions in several important Canadian theatres, including the Stratford Festival, the Centaur Theatre. and the Saidye Bronfman Centre for the Arts. For her 1982 performance in Straight Ahead/Blind Dancers she was awarded both a Dora Mavor Moore Award and the best performer award at the Edinburgh Fringe Festival.

A prolific television actress, Dunsmore began her screen career with appearances in The Littlest Hobo in 1980. She became well known for her portrayal of Katherine Brooke in the 1987 miniseries Anne of Green Gables: The Sequel (more widely known as Anne of Avonlea outside Canada). She later appeared in the recurring role of Abigail MacEwan in Road to Avonlea (1990–1996). From 1990–1992 she starred as the central character of Sally Sullivan in two seasons of the Canadian television comedy-drama series Mom P.I.. She has guest starred on the Canadian television programs Being Erica, Degrassi: The Next Generation, Hangin' In, Lost Girl, Murdoch Mysteries, and ReGenesis. On American television she has appeared in Beauty and the Beast , L.A. Law, Queer as Folk, and The Twilight Zone.

In film, Dunsmore had roles in the Hollywood films Twins (1988), Total Recall (1990) and Cliffhanger (1993). In 2009, she won the ACTRA Award for Best Actress for her performance in the film The Baby Formula.

She was formerly married to actor Peter Dvorsky.

== Filmography ==
=== Film ===
Year	Title	Role	Notes
1988	Twins	Miss Busby	
1990	Total Recall	Dr. Renata Lull	
1993	Cliffhanger	Treasury Secretary	
1995	Bach's Fight for Freedom	Gerta	
1996	Natural Enemy	Judy	Video
1998	Strike!	Page Sawyer	AKA, All I Wanna Do
2001	Good Stuff	Doctor	Short film
2003	Dreamcatcher	Roberta Cavell	
2004	White Knuckles	Victoria Conrad	
2006	Citizen Duane	Mayor Kelly Milton	
2007	Bonded Pairs	Rosemary	Short film
2008	The Baby Formula	Wanda	
2009	Orphan	Grandma Barbara	
2009	At Home by Myself...With You	Bessie	
2010	Empty	Margaret Burke	Video short
2011	Faces in the Crowd	Dr. Langenkamp #2	
2012	The Riverbank	Miranda Magos	
2012	Miskate	Grandma	Short fim
2013	The Hot Flash	Nana	Short film
2014	Don't Get Killed in Alaska	Jan	
2015	How to Plan an Orgy in a Small Town	Seth's Mother	
2017	Blood Honey	Louisa Lippe	
2020	The Toll	Lorraine	
2020	Dear Jesus	Sister Bernadette	Short film
2021	Kicking Blood	Bernice	
2023	To Catch a Killer	Mrs. Possey	
2024	Thereby Hangs a Tale	Mary	Short film

=== Television ===
Year	Title	Role	Notes
1980	The Littlest Hobo	Dixie	"Ghost Rig"
1981	The Littlest Hobo	Di Jarrett	"Airport"
1982	Off Your Rocker	Barbara "Babs"	TV film
1982	Hangin' In	Jocelyn	"The Reunion"
1983	As You Like It	Celia	TV film
1985	ABC Weekend Special	Mrs. Settergren	"Pippi Longstocking"
1986	The Frantics: Four on the Floor	Various Characters	TV show (Episodes 1.02-1.04)
1986	Miles to Go...	Cynthia	TV film
1986–1990	The Campbells	Mary McTavish	Recurring role
1987	Race for the Bomb	Jean O'Leary	TV miniseries
1987	Anne of Green Gables: The Sequel	Katherine Brooke	TV miniseries
1987	After the Promise	Florence Jackson	TV film
1987	Danger Bay	Agnes Calhoun	"A Tangled Web"
1987	Street Legal	Samantha Greene	"Romeo and Carol"
1988	A Father's Homecoming	Dolores	TV film
1988	Go Toward the Light	Sally	TV film
1988	Favorite Son	Mrs. Harriet Fallon	TV miniseries
1988	L.A. Law	Ina Toland	"The Princess and the Pee"
1988	The Twilight Zone	Elise	"Appointment on Route 17"
1988	Blades of Courage	Carla LaRoche	TV film
1989	My Two Dads	Dr. Stuart	"Who's on First?"
1989	Hunter	Rachel Sands	"Me, Myself & Die"
1989	Beauty and the Beast	Virginia Sheets	"Trial"
1990	MacGyver	Dr. Gwen Carpenter	"Deep Cover"
1990	Personals	Susan Merchant	TV film
1990	E.N.G.	Kathleen Kenner	"Catch a Falling Star"
1990	Mom P.I.	Sally Sullivan	TV film
1990	Street Legal	Marlene Weiss	"Shadow Boxing"
1990–1996	Road to Avonlea	Abigail MacEwan	5 episodes
1991	The Boys	Helene	TV film
1993	Liar, Liar: Between Father and Daughter	Mary Farrow	TV film
1993	E.N.G.	Dr. Boyd	"And the Winner Is..."
1993	Shattered Trust: The Shari Karney Story	Rose Beckman	TV film
1994	RoboCop: The Series	Ms. Leachman	"Mother's Day"
1996	Kung Fu: The Legend Continues	Rachel	"Dragon's Lair"
1996	Undue Influence	Carla Morgan	TV film
1996	We the Jury	Dr. Ruth Quintero	TV film
1997	Breaking the Surface: The Greg Louganis Story	Frances Louganis	TV film
1997	Poltergeist: The Legacy	Dr. Emily Randall	"Fear"
1998	The Long Way Home	Mrs. Bossert	TV film
1998	When He Didn't Come Home	Mrs. Blair	TV film
1998	Psi Factor: Chronicles of the Paranormal	Dr. Ruth Godwin	"The Undead, The/Stalker"
1999	Freak City	Mary Manmouth	TV film
1999	Dear America: The Winter of Red Snow	Mama	TV short
1999	At the Mercy of a Stranger	Jan Scott	TV film
2000	Secret Cutting	Principal Luce	TV film
2001	Life with Judy Garland: Me and My Shadows	Ida Koverman	TV miniseries
2001	The Warden	Mrs. Winchwood	TV film
2001	Hangman	Dr. Natalie Walsh	TV film
2001	Anne of Green Gables: The Animated Series	E.J. Lark (voice)	"A Welcome Hero"
2001	Blue Murder	Principal Leona Harcourt	"All Saints"
2001	Dangerous Child	Margo	TV film
2001–2003	Soul Food	Judge Priscilla Barnes	"Games People Play", "Never Can Say Goodbye", "Shades of Grey"
2002	The Associates	Judge Martin	"Soulmates", "Liar, Liar"
2002	The Interrogation of Michael Crowe	Dorothy Sorenson	TV film
2003	Profoundly Normal	Charlotte Johnson	TV film
2003	Queer as Folk	Judge	"Stop Hurting Us"
2004	Redemption: The Stan Tookie Williams Story	Warden Woodford	TV film
2004	Degrassi: The Next Generation	Judge	"Ghost in the Machine"
2004	The Grid	Lois Avery	TV miniseries
2004	Wild Card	Mrs. Sutton	"Premonition Mission"
2004	A Very Married Christmas	Osa Larson	TV film
2004–2005	ReGenesis	Congresswoman Shuler	Recurring role
2005	Kevin Hill	Judge Landell	"Occupational Hazard"
2006	Playing House	Madeline	TV film
2006	At the Hotel	Marcia Bridge	"Modern Solutions to Modern Problems"
2006	Covert One: The Hades Factor	Nancy Langford	TV miniseries
2006	Wedding Wars	Claire Welling	TV film
2007	St. Urbain's Horseman	Hannah	TV miniseries
2007	They Come Back	Mrs. Carr	TV film
2007	The Altar Boy Gang	Kate	TV series
2008	A Raisin in the Sun	Mrs. Arnold	TV film
2008	Burn Up	Margo	"1.2"
2008	For the Love of Grace	Alicia	TV film
2009	Being Erica	Tania	"Til Death"
2009	Guns	Janet Patterson	TV miniseries
2009	The Good Times Are Killing Me	Melanie	TV film
2009	Too Late to Say Goodbye	Narda Barber	TV film
2009	Cra$h & Burn	Mrs. McCutcheon	"Trust"
2009	Nureyev	Diane	TV film
2010	Murdoch Mysteries	Bernice Taylor	"Me, Myself and Murdoch"
2010	When Love Is Not Enough: The Lois Wilson Story	Matilda Burnham	TV film
2010	Living in Your Car	Mira Shaw	"Chapter 3"
2010	Unnatural History	Mrs. Elaine Dunsmoor	"Public School Enemies"
2010	Red: Werewolf Hunter	Grandmother Sullivan	TV film
2010–2012	Ruby Skye P.I.	Ava O'Deary	Recurring role
2011	The Santa Suit	Marge	TV film
2011	Little Mosque on the Prairie	Mrs. Harper	"Love at First Fight"
2012	Guidestones	Jacqueline Glenndenning	"The Truth: Parts 1 & 2"
2012	Fugitive at 17	Grandmother	TV film
2013	The Surrogacy Trap	Beth Franklin	TV film
2013	Cracked	Mrs. Dunlow	"How the Light Gets In"
2014	Remedy	Violet Patterson	"Shadow of Doubt"
2015–2016	Between	Minister Miller	Recurring role
2015	The Plateaus	Nun #1	Recurring role
2015–2017	Orphan Black	Professor Susan Duncan	Recurring role
2018	PAW Patrol	Ms. Marjorie (voice)	Recurring role
2019	Coroner	Mrs. Panych	"Black Dog", "Bridges"
2019	Street Legal	Renee Darling	Recurring role
2019	The Hot Zone	Nancy's Aunt	"Arrival", "Expendable", "Hidden"
2021–2022	Chucky	Dr. Mixter	Recurring role
2021–2022	Chucky	Chucky	Episode: "Chucky Actually"
2022	Good Sam	Helen Fletcher	"Attachments", "To Whom It May Concern"
2022	Three Pines	Irene Morrow	"The Murder Stone: Part One", "The Murder Stone: Part Two"
2023	Fellow Travelers	Estelle Fuller	Episode: "Bulletproof"

== Awards and nominations ==
Awards
Year	Award	Category	Production	Result
1988	Gemini	Best Performance by a Supporting Actress	Blades of Courage	Nominated
2001	Gemini	Best Performance by an Actress in a Guest Role in a Dramatic Series	Blue Murder	Nominated
2008	ACTRA Awards	Best Female Performance	The Baby Formula	Won
