= Time to Say Goodbye? =

1997 American television film

- Written by: Jacqueline Feather; David Seidler
- Directed by: David Jones
- Starring: Eva Marie Saint; Richard Kiley; Margaret Colin; Rick Roberts
- Music by: Peter Rodgers Melnick
- Country of origin: United States
- Original language: English

Production
- Executive producer: Jinny Schreckinger
- Producers: Julian Marks; Bonnie Forbes
- Cinematography: Mike Fash
- Editor: Pam Malouf-Cundy
- Running time: 91 minutes
- Production company: Heart Entertainment

Original release
- Network: Lifetime
- Release: September 1, 1997

Time to Say Goodbye? is a 1997 American made-for-television drama film directed by David Jones and starring Eva Marie Saint. The film is centered on the decision of an elderly family patriarch to end his life, when faced with the degradation of Alzheimer's disease. The film originally premiered on Lifetime cable network on September 1, 1997.

== Cast ==
- Eva Marie Saint as Ruth Klooster
- Richard Kiley as Dr. Gerald Klooster
- Margaret Colin as Kristen Hamstra
- Rick Roberts as Chip Klooster
- Alex Carter as Craig Klooster
- Kevin Hicks as Curt Klooster
- John Neville as Michigan Judge
- Elizabeth Shepherd as Teresa Rodriguez
- Louis Di Bianco as Joe Rodriguez
- Greg Ellwand as Bill
- Tracey Hoyt as Mary
- Catherine McNally as Betty
- Max Naiman as Zachery
- Connor Cunningham as Alexander
- John Boylan as Dr. Peters
- Richard McMillan as Dr. Fawcett
- John Innes as Stroup
- Martin Doyle as Earhart
- David Eisner as Justis
- Thomas Hauff as Judge McKinistry
- Philip Akin as Airport Police Officer
- Ronn Sarosiak as Florida Patrolman
- Matthew Bennett as FBI Officer
- James Downing as Tony
- Harry Hamlin
