= Spinnolio =

- Directed by: John Weldon
- Written by: John Weldon
- Produced by: Wolf Koenig
- Starring: Henry Ramer; Peter MacNeill; Neil Shee; Janet Perlman; Lynn Smith; Don Arioli
- Music by: Art Phillips
- Production company: National Film Board of Canada
- Release date: 1977
- Running time: 10 minutes
- Country: Canada
- Language: English

Spinnolio is a Canadian animated short film, directed by John Weldon and released in 1977. A parody of Pinocchio, the film tells the story of an old man who carves a wooden boy; however, as the fairy never arrives to grant him life, Spinnolio remains wooden and inanimate, but nevertheless successfully establishes a career working at the complaints desk of a department store because of his apparent skill at listening without talking.

The film's voice cast includes Henry Ramer, Peter MacNeill, Neil Shee, Janet Perlman, Lynn Smith and Don Arioli.

The film won the Canadian Film Award for Best Animated Short Film at the 28th Canadian Film Awards.
