= Avery Saltzman =

Canadian actor (born 1956)

Avery Saltzman (born June 17, 1956) is a Canadian actor and theater director. He is a co-artistic director with David Eisner at the Harold Green Jewish Theatre Company. Saltzman was born and raised in Toronto.

== Career ==
Since 1978, Saltzman has been a professional actor. For 30 years, he was primarily an actor performing at theatres cross North America and England.
