= E.N.G. =

1989 Canadian drama television series

- Created by: Bryce Zabel & Brad Markowitz
- Composers: Micky Erbe and Maribeth Solomon
- Country of origin: Canada
- No. of seasons: 5
- No. of episodes: 96

Production
- Running time: 60 minutes

Original release
- Network: CTV
- Release: October 31, 1989 – March 17, 1994

E.N.G. is a Canadian television drama, following the staff of a fictional Toronto television news station. The show aired on CTV from 1989 to 1994. The series ran for 96 episodes, produced by the Alliance Entertainment Corporation.

== Plot ==
"E.N.G." stands for electronic news-gathering. The show is led by Anne Hildebrandt (Sara Botsford), the senior executive producer of the news broadcasts on fictional Toronto television station, CTLS channel 10. Hildebrandt is bright, assertive and also having a clandestine affair with star cameraman Jake Antonelli (Mark Humphrey). Jake is younger and married to Martha with two children; after Jake and Martha divorce, son Jeff lives with Jake, while their daughter lives with her mother.

Mike Fennell (Art Hindle) is the station's newly-appointed news director, taking a position Anne had been expecting to receive. Mike aims to improve ratings of the newscasts and his coverage philosophy is in obvious conflict with Anne's. Anne and Mike find common ground and later become romantically involved. Mike has a troubled teenage daughter named Carrie from his previous marriage; Carrie lives in Vancouver.

Other members of the CTLS staff include Jane Oliver, the station's weathercaster; Seth Miller, who worries about being pushed into retirement due to his age; Kyle Copeland, the station's general manager who sometimes clashes with both Anne and Mike; Bobbi Katz, another camera person; J.C. Callahan, the station's alcoholic and cranky assignment editor, who later is left requiring a wheelchair by an accident; Marge Atherton, the station's video editor, who is very motherly and offers co-workers advice, and a compassionate shoulder to lean on; Dan Watson, a smarmy senior reporter who occasionally puts his foot in his mouth. Janice Roberts, a news researcher, joins channel 10 the same day Mike does. Janice later commits suicide after becoming too emotionally involved in a story. Bruce Foreman is a devious and scheming assistant assignment editor; Eric "Mac" MacFarlane is the newscast's openly-gay floor manager; Terri Morgan, a scheming reporter who tends to be very cut-throat. Victor Garber has a recurring role as tycoon Adam Hirsch, who owned CTLS during the final three seasons.

At the end of the series, Anne and Mike try to balance their personal and professional lives, when it is revealed that CTLS is going from a hard news format to a lifestyles format. Mike receives a new job offer in Japan, and invites Anne to go with him. After making peace with Jake, who urged her to have a life with Mike, Anne decides to accept his offer, although she would not be permitted to work, by Japanese law. In the final episode, "The Cutting Edge", Clarke Roberts (Janice's brother) dares Anne to get back in the trenches and help him with a hard news story. She does, finding how much she loves the excitement. She is offered a job at another news station, by the station owner (Simon MacCorkindale). After talking to Mike, they decide they want different things. Mike goes to Japan to begin his new job. Anne is last seen standing outside the building where her new job, as station manager will begin.

== Episodes ==
=== Season 1 (1989–90) ===
| No. overall | No. in season | Title | Directed by | Written by | Original release date |
|---|---|---|---|---|---|
| 1 | 1 | "Pilot" | Mario Azzopardi | Bryce Zabel & Brad Markowitz | October 31, 1989 |
| 2 | 2 | "Pilot" | Mario Azzopardi | Bryce Zabel & Brad Markowitz | October 31, 1989 |
| 3 | 3 | "Special Segment" | Steve DiMarco | R.B. Carney | 1989 |
| 4 | 4 | "Forests of the Night" | Martin Lavut | Brad Markowitz, Barbara Samuels | 1989 |
| 5 | 5 | "Your Place or Mine" | Steve DiMarco | Wayne Grigsby | 1989 |
| 6 | 6 | "Dirty Trick" | Martin Lavut | Ian Sutherland, William Kuhns | 1989 |
| 7 | 7 | "The Chilling Effect" | TBD | Brad Markowitz | 1989 |
| 8 | 8 | "Running with the Pack" | Martin Lavut | Dawn Ritchie | 1989 |
| 9 | 9 | "Catch a Falling Star" | Sturla Gunnarsson | Peter Lauterman, Angelo Stea | 1990 |
| 10 | 10 | "A Tangled Web" | TBD | Brad Markowitz | 1990 |
| 11 | 11 | "A Brief Madness" | Ryszard Bugajski | Wayne Grigsby | 1990 |
| 12 | 12 | "Till Death Do Us Part" | René Bonnière | Marlene Matthews | 1990 |
| 13 | 13 | "Striking Out" | Ken Girotti | Avrum Jacobson | 1990 |
| 14 | 14 | "False Fire" | Jerry Ciccoritti | Ian Sutherland, William Kuhns | 1990 |
| 15 | 15 | "Otherwise Inflicted" | Peter Rowe | Robert Forsyth | 1990 |
| 16 | 16 | "All Things Betray Thee" | Donald Shebib | Wayne Grigsby | February 15, 1990 |
| 17 | 17 | "Into Darkness" | Peter Rowe | Elliot L. Sims | February 22, 1990 |
| 18 | 18 | "The Souls of Our Heroes" | George Bloomfield | Don Truckey | 1990 |
| 19 | 19 | "Ghosts" | Allan Kroeker | Brad Markowitz, Barbara Samuels | 1990 |
| 20 | 20 | "Fools Rush In" | Jerry Ciccoritti | Renata Bright | 1990 |
| 21 | 21 | "Victims" | Ken Girotti | Peter Mohan | 1990 |
| 22 | 22 | "Division of Labour" | René Bonnière | R.B. Carney | 1990 |
| 23 | 23 | "Line of Fire" | Randy Bradshaw | Wayne Grigsby | 1990 |
| 24 | 24 | "Crossroads" | Don McBrearty | Brad Markowitz, Barbara Samuels | 1990 |
| 25 | 25 | "In Love and War" | Mario Azzopardi | Rick Shiomi | 1990 |
| 26 | 26 | "Traitors All" | Steve DiMarco | Rebecca Schechter | 1990 |

=== Season 2 (1990–91) ===
| No. overall | No. in season | Title | Directed by | Written by | Original release date |
|---|---|---|---|---|---|
| 27 | 1 | "Word of Mouth" | Don McBrearty | Wayne Grigsby | 1990 |
| 28 | 2 | "Malicious Intent" | Steve DiMarco | Brad Markowitz, Barbara Samuels | 1990 |
| 29 | 3 | "The Dancer and the Dance" | George Bloomfield | Peter Lauterman, Angelo Stea | 1990 |
| 30 | 4 | "Scratches on a Plaster Wall" | Jerry Ciccoritti | Robert Forsyth | 1990 |
| 31 | 5 | "Bones" | Steve DiMarco | Ian Sutherland | 1990 |
| 32 | 6 | "Payment in Kind" | George Bloomfield | Brad Markowitz, Barbara Samuels | 1990 |
| 33 | 7 | "Ripples in a Pond" | Jerry Ciccoritti | Wayne Grigsby | 1990 |
| 34 | 8 | "All in the Game" | Ken Girotti | Rick Shiomi | 1990 |
| 35 | 9 | "Force of Reason" | George Bloomfield | Wayne Grigsby | 1990 |
| 36 | 10 | "Duffy, Bok, & Flann" | René Bonnière | Ian Sutherland | 1990 |
| 37 | 11 | "A Long Way from Hopeful" | Don McBrearty | Robert Forsyth | 1990 |
| 38 | 12 | "A Wing and a Prayer" | George Bloomfield | Wayne Grigsby | 1990 |
| 39 | 13 | "In the Blood" | Don McBrearty | Bruce Martin | 1991 |
| 40 | 14 | "Seeing is Believing" | Peter Rowe | Wayne Grigsby | 1991 |
| 41 | 15 | "Lest You Be Judged" | Donald Shebib | Brad Markowitz, Barbara Samuels | 1991 |
| 42 | 16 | "Tyger, Tyger" | Jerry Ciccoritti | Ian Sutherland, Rick Shiomi | 1991 |
| 43 | 17 | "Up on the Roof" | René Bonnière | Pamela Soper | 1991 |
| 44 | 18 | "Lip Service" | Eleanore Lindo | Wayne Grigsby | 1991 |
| 45 | 19 | "Past Imperfect" | Steve DiMarco | Brad Markowitz, Barbara Samuels | 1991 |
| 46 | 20 | "Suffer the Little Children" | Art Hindle | Ian Sutherland, Jean Brent Thomas | 1991 |

=== Season 3 (1991–92) ===
| No. overall | No. in season | Title | Directed by | Written by | Original release date |
|---|---|---|---|---|---|
| 47 | 1 | "Ways and Means" | Eleanore Lindo | Wayne Grigsby, Barbara Samuels | October 31, 1991 |
| 48 | 2 | "Picnic" | Don McBrearty | Anne Reiter | November 7, 1991 |
| 49 | 3 | "Illuminations" | George Bloomfield | David Young | 1991 |
| 50 | 4 | "Secrets" | René Bonnière | Bruce Martin | 1991 |
| 51 | 5 | "Smoke and Mirrors" | George Bloomfield | Peter Lauterman, Angelo Stea | 1991 |
| 52 | 6 | "Intruders" | Jerry Ciccoritti | Jeremy Hole | 1991 |
| 53 | 7 | "Pirates" | Steve DiMarco | Dave Cole | 1991 |
| 54 | 8 | "Two for the Show" | Art Hindle | Robert Forsyth | 1992 |
| 55 | 9 | "The Sleep of Reason" | Steve DiMarco | Ian Sutherland | 1992 |
| 56 | 10 | "Final Cut" | Peter Rowe | Peter Lauterman, Angelo Stea | 1992 |
| 57 | 11 | "Double Vision" | George Mendeluk | Rick Shiomi | 1992 |
| 58 | 12 | "The Best Defence" | Joanna McIntyre | Wayne Grigsby | 1992 |
| 59 | 13 | "Public Enemy" | René Bonnière | Dave Cole, Laurie Pearson | 1992 |
| 60 | 14 | "True Patriot Love" | Don McBrearty | David Young | February 27, 1992 |
| 61 | 15 | "Child's Play" | Jerry Ciccoritti | Peter Lauterman, Angelo Stea | March 5, 1992 |
| 62 | 16 | "Acid Test" | Don McBrearty | Robert Forsyth | 1992 |
| 63 | 17 | "Harvest" | Donald Shebib | Stephen Alix | 1992 |
| 64 | 18 | "Pressure" | Peter Rowe | Peter Lauterman, Angelo Stea | 1992 |

=== Season 4 (1992–93) ===
| No. overall | No. in season | Title | Directed by | Written by | Original release date |
|---|---|---|---|---|---|
| 65 | 1 | "After the Fire" | George Bloomfield | Angelo Stea | September 10, 1992 |
| 66 | 2 | "Waves" | Don McBrearty | Peter Lauterman | 1992 |
| 67 | 3 | "Another Pretty Face" | Jerry Ciccoritti | Dave Cole | 1992 |
| 68 | 4 | "Heart of the Matter" | René Bonnière | James Blacker | 1992 |
| 69 | 5 | "The Big Squeeze" | Steve DiMarco | David Young | 1992 |
| 70 | 6 | "To Kill with Kindness" | Steve DiMarco | J.K.E. Rose | 1992 |
| 71 | 7 | "Love and Duty" | George Bloomfield | Angelo Stea | 1992 |
| 72 | 8 | "Baby It's You" | Peter Rowe | Dave Cole | December 17, 1992 |
| 73 | 9 | "Pandora's Box" | Art Hindle | Ann MacNaughton | January 14, 1993 |
| 74 | 10 | "The Good Samaritan" | Stacey Stewart Curtis | Peter Lauterman | 1993 |
| 75 | 11 | "Love and Marriage" | René Bonnière | David Young | 1993 |
| 76 | 12 | "Bail Out" | Joanna McIntyre | James Blacker | 1993 |
| 77 | 13 | "The Big Sleepover" | Eleanore Lindo | Stephen Alix | 1993 |
| 78 | 14 | "One False Step" | Bruce Pittman | Dave Cole | March 18, 1993 |
| 79 | 15 | "Hero" | George Bloomfield | Stephen Alix | 1993 |
| 80 | 16 | "Mirror, Mirror" | Art Hindle | Ann MacNaughton | 1993 |
| 81 | 17 | "Honour or Wealth" | Steve DiMarco | Oleh Iwanyshyn, Carl Knutson | 1993 |
| 82 | 18 | "And the Winner is..." | Timothy Bond | Peter Lauterman | 1993 |

=== Season 5 (1993–94) ===
| No. overall | No. in season | Title | Directed by | Written by | Original release date |
|---|---|---|---|---|---|
| 83 | 1 | "Overload" | Jerry Ciccoritti | Richard Oleksiak | October 28, 1993 |
| 84 | 2 | "Within the Law" | Timothy Bond | Deborah Nathan | November 4, 1993 |
| 85 | 3 | "Full Disclosure" | George Bloomfield | Ann MacNaughton | November 11, 1993 |
| 86 | 4 | "Suspicious Minds" | René Bonnière | Brad Markowitz | November 25, 1993 |
| 87 | 5 | "Crime and Punishment" | Stacey Stewart Curtis | Angelo Stea | December 2, 1993 |
| 88 | 6 | "Legacy" | Timothy Bond | Peter Mitchell | December 9, 1993 |
| 89 | 7 | "Judgement of Solomon" | Joanna McIntyre | Rebecca Schechter | December 16, 1993 |
| 90 | 8 | "Payback" | Graeme Lynch | Richard Oleksiak | January 13, 1991 |
| 91 | 9 | "Power Politics" | Jerry Ciccoritti | Ann MacNaughton, Richard Oleksiak | January 27, 1994 |
| 92 | 10 | "The Play's the Thing" | Steve DiMarco | Rebecca Schechter | February 3, 1994 |
| 93 | 11 | "The Road Not Taken" | Art Hindle | Ann MacNaughton | February 10, 1994 |
| 94 | 12 | "Before the Axe" | Art Hindle | Robert Forsyth | March 3, 1994 |
| 95 | 13 | "Memories" | René Bonnière | Ann MacNaughton | March 10, 1994 |
| 96 | 14 | "The Cutting Edge" | Bruce Pittman | David Barlow | March 17, 1994 |

== Main cast ==
- Anne Hildebrandt — Sara Botsford
- Jake Antonelli — Mark Humphrey
- Mike Fennell — Art Hindle
- Eric MacFarlane — Jonathan Welsh
- J.C. Callahan — Neil Dainard
- Dan Watson — Karl Pruner
- Terri Morgan — Cynthia Belliveau
- Seth Miller — James Millington
- Bobbi Katz — Mary Beth Rubens
- Kyle Copeland — George R. Robertson
- Jane Oliver — Sherry Miller
- Marge Atherton — Theresa Tova
- Clarke Roberts — Clark Johnson
- Janice Roberts — Rachael Crawford
- Kelly Longstreet — Lisa LaCroix
- Adam Hirsch — Victor Garber
- Benajir Kafshi — Madhuri Bhatia

== Reception ==
Jim Leach argues that E.N.G. attempted to "negotiate between the traditions of Canadian television and formulas of the popular American programs that dominate CITV's schedule." He says that the series was often compared with the Canadian Broadcasting Company's Street Legal, covering the "personal and professional entanglements" of a law office". Both of these show were in turn compared to Hill Street Blues and LA Law. Unlike much of Canadian drama which had been produced by public networks, Leach reflects that "the success of E.N.G. raised hopes that the private networks would offer more support to Canadian producers."

The show, according to Leach, followed a tradition of documentary realism and social responsibility. However, he argues, the formula owes more to "melodramatic structures" of daytime soap operas rather than the "Canadian suspicion of 'crisis structures'".

The show won ten Gemini Awards, including best dramatic programming series. Broadcast historian Michael Nolan observes that the show was "critically acclaimed" yet "lost money every time it was aired, an illustration of how expensive the genre of Canadian dramatic programming was to produce in an increasingly fragmented television market."

== International broadcasts ==
E.N.G. was also screened in the United Kingdom on Channel 4, which aired the first four seasons but chose not to present the fifth and final season. In the United States, the show aired in syndication. It also aired on Lifetime in the United States during the 1990-91 season, originally in the 7 PM (EST) slot, but due to poor ratings, was moved to late nights after only several weeks. In Spain the series aired on Antena 3TV dubbed into Spanish and with the title "E.N.G. Reporteros" in a weekday 530pm slot. The channel screened a great number of episodes but never completed the entire run. The series has never been repeated on Spanish TV. In Macedonia it aired on the national MRT. In South Africa it aired on the SABC2 channel.
