= Bob McKeown =

Canadian investigative journalist and football player

Bob McKeown CM
- Born: Robert Duff McKeown; October 10, 1950 (age 76); Ottawa, Ontario, Canada
- Education: Yale University
- Occupations: Investigative journalist; football player
- Employer: Canadian Broadcasting Corporation
- Awards: Order of Canada
- Football career

Profile
- Position: Center

Personal information
- Listed height: 6 ft 2 in (1.88 m)
- Listed weight: 225 lb (102 kg)

Career information
- College: Yale

Career history
- 1971–1975: Ottawa Rough Riders

Awards and highlights
- Grey Cup champion (1973); CFL East All-Star (1974)

Robert Duff McKeown, CM (/məˈkjuːən/ mə-KEW-ən; born October 10, 1950) is a retired Canadian investigative reporter and former all-star and championship football player. He has worked for CBC Television and has also worked for NBC and CBS. McKeown returned to the CBC in November 2002 to host its investigative program, The Fifth Estate, a show which he had previously hosted from 1981 to 1990. In the intervening period, McKeown spent eight years working for Dateline NBC as a correspondent and five years with CBS News.

== Early life ==
McKeown graduated from Yale University and had a five-year professional football career before dedicating himself to journalism. Before beginning his broadcasting career, McKeown played professional football for five seasons with the CFL's Ottawa Rough Riders. The Rough Riders won the Grey Cup in 1973. McKeown was an all-star in 1974 at the position of centre.

McKeown dealt with concussions during his football career. In a November 2016 CBC News article, he announced that he would donate his brain to the Canadian Sports Concussion Project.

== Career ==
=== Dateline ===
McKeown's work with Dateline includes coverage of the World Trade Center Attacks and the Oklahoma City bombing and investigations into hurricanes, tornados, great white sharks and pastor Benny Hinn (on whom he also did a Fifth Estate report).

=== CBS ===
A five-year stint with CBS News is highlighted by his award-winning coverage of the Persian Gulf War. McKeown was the first reporter to broadcast from the front lines during Operation Desert Storm and reached Kuwait City as Iraqi troops were fleeing, almost a day before allied forces arrived. People Magazine wrote: "McKeown and his crew survived artillery, minefields and Iraqi snipers to get the best story of the Gulf War." While at CBS, he was also a correspondent for two prime-time newsmagazines, Street Stories and America Tonight, and contributed to 48 Hours and the CBS Evening News.

=== The Fifth Estate ===
In January 2005, McKeown challenged a statement made by American conservative polemicist Ann Coulter during her Fifth Estate interview. Coulter had asserted that Canada's non-participation in the 2003 invasion of Iraq demonstrated that Canada's "loyal friendship" with the United States was weaker than in the past. As part of her broader attempt to compare the Canadian response to the Iraq war with that of Vietnam, Coulter erroneously asserted that "Canada sent troops to Vietnam." McKeown corrected her, "No, actually, Canada didn't send troops to Vietnam." Although no uniformed Canadian troops were involved in war, Canadians did participate through counterinsurgency efforts in South Vietnam and reconnaissance for US bombing runs in North Vietnam. Later during an interview on the American C-SPAN channel, Coulter stated that McKeown did not mention that 10,000 Canadian troops ran across the border to enlist in the United States army. She also went on to call McKeown "a bubble-head, a Ted Baxter."

McKeown has also taken on other conservative pundits, such as Fox News Channel host Bill O'Reilly, whom he accused of lying and distorting facts, while trying to convey the news to the American people. McKeown used O'Reilly's reference to what he called the "Paris Business Review" and the billions of dollars France had lost due to the boycott that he had initialized following France's decision not to participate in the 2003 invasion of Iraq. McKeown pointed out that trade between France and the United States actually went up since O'Reilly initialized the boycott and that the Paris Business Review does not even exist.

In 1982, McKeown anchored a special Fifth Estate report about animal cruelty in Hollywood, focusing on the 1958 Walt Disney film White Wilderness as well as the television program Mutual of Omaha's Wild Kingdom. In the report, McKeown found that the lemming scene was filmed not at the Arctic Ocean, but at the Bow River near downtown Calgary, where the lemmings were forced into the river; in addition, he also discovered that the footage of a polar bear cub falling down an Arctic ice slope was in actuality filmed in a Calgary film studio. In light of the findings for the report, McKeown asked Wild Kingdom host Marlin Perkins if he had deliberately injured or killed animals while making wildlife films. Perkins, then in his seventies, "firmly asked for the camera to be turned off, then punched a shocked McKeown in the face."

McKeown retired at the end of November 2024 after hosting a retrospective marking The Fifth Estate's fiftieth anniversary.

=== Documentary films ===
In addition to hosting The Fifth Estate in the 1980s, McKeown produced, wrote and directed several critically acclaimed documentaries. These include The Boys on the Bus, an intimate portrait of the Edmonton Oilers as they won the 1987 Stanley Cup; Les Canadiens, a history of the Montreal Canadiens; and Strangers in a Strange Land, which depicted the trials and tribulations of a Canadian movie crew in China as it shot the feature film Bethune: The Making of a Hero about the legendary doctor, Norman Bethune.

== Accolades ==
He has reported from more than 60 countries and has been recognized with dozens of major journalistic prizes, including two Emmys - for the Gulf War and Dateline—three Geminis, two Edward R. Murrow awards, two Gracies, two National Headliner awards and a National Press Club award.

McKeown was appointed as a member of the Order of Canada on 16 November 2021 "for his excellence in investigative journalism for television". He was invested with the insignia of the Order of Canada on 3 October 2024. This gave him the Post Nominal Letters "CM" for Life.
