= Grand Poobah =

Satirical term for self-important local officials

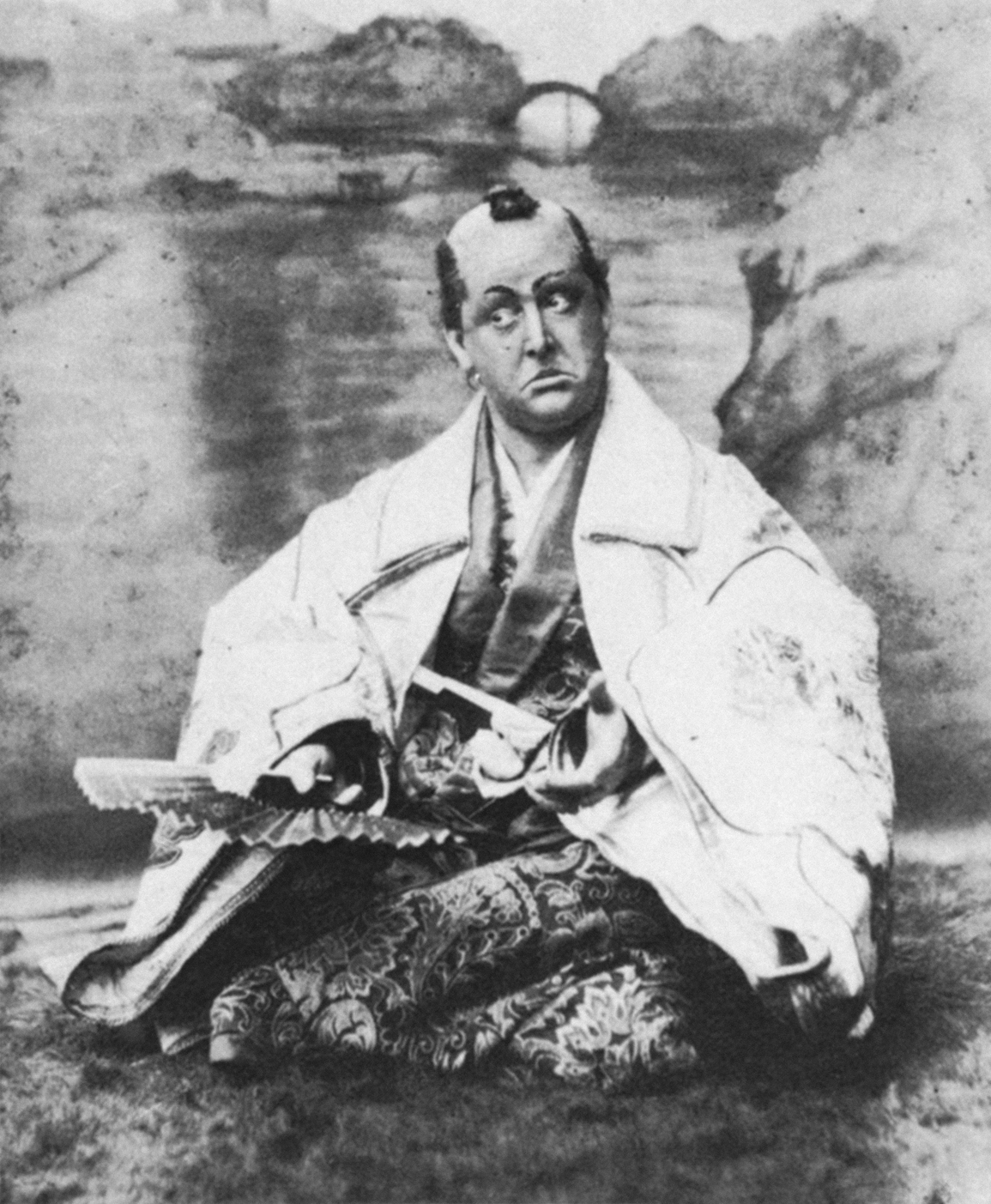
Rutland Barrington, who originated the role of Pooh-Bah

Grand Poobah is a term derived from the name of the haughty, prideful character Pooh-Bah in Gilbert and Sullivan's The Mikado (1885). In this comic opera, Pooh-Bah holds numerous exalted offices, including "First Lord of the Treasury, Lord Chief Justice, Commander-in-Chief, Lord High Admiral ... Archbishop ... Lord Mayor" and "Lord High Everything Else". The name has come to be used as a mocking title for someone self-important or locally high-ranking and who either exhibits an inflated self-regard or who has limited authority while taking impressive titles. The American writer William Safire wrote that "everyone assumes [the name] Pooh-Bah merely comes from [W. S. Gilbert] combining the two negative exclamations Pooh! plus Bah!, typical put-downs from a typical bureaucrat."

== Other uses ==
The title "Grand Poobah" was used recurrently on the television show The Flintstones as the name of a high-ranking elected position in a secret society, the Loyal Order of Water Buffaloes. Similarly, Howard Cunningham, a character on the TV series Happy Days, was a Grand Poobah of Leopard Lodge No. 462 in Milwaukee. These fictional lodges were a spoof of secret societies and men's clubs like the Freemasons, the Shriners, the Elks Club and the Moose Lodge. The title has been associated ironically with real-world people, sometimes used facetiously in self-reference, sometimes to praise someone, and at other times to criticize an organizational leader for being overbearing.

== See also ==
- Dual mandate
