= The King Chronicle =

Canadian docudrama television miniseries

- Genre: Drama
- Written by: Donald Brittain
- Directed by: Donald Brittain
- Starring: Sean McCann; Gary Reineke; Sandy Webster
- Theme music composer: Milan Kymlicka; Eldon Rathburn
- Country of origin: Canada
- Original language: English
- No. of episodes: 3

Production
- Producers: Adam Symansky; Darce Fardy; Peter Katadotis
- Cinematography: Savas Kalogeras
- Editors: Robert Benson; Roger Hart; Rita Roy
- Running time: 120 minutes

Original release
- Network: CBC Television
- Release: March 27 – March 29, 1988

The King Chronicle is a Canadian docudrama television miniseries, directed by Donald Brittain and broadcast by CBC Television in 1988. Blending both documentary and dramatic elements, the six-hour series was a portrait of former Canadian Prime Minister Mackenzie King, with Sean McCann in the leading role.

The first episode centred primarily on King's pre-political family background, the second focused on his early political career including the King–Byng affair of 1926, and the third focused on his late political career including the Conscription Crisis of 1944.

The cast also included Gary Reineke as King's economic advisor Oscar D. Skelton, Albert Millaire as prime minister Wilfrid Laurier, Sandy Webster as cabinet minister James Ralston, R. H. Thomson as military commander and diplomat Andrew McNaughton, George Merner as Winston Churchill, Richard Farrell as Governor-General Julian Byng, 1st Viscount Byng of Vimy, Patricia Collins as Evelyn Byng, Viscountess Byng of Vimy, Doris Petrie as King's mother Isabel, and Tom Harvey as Franklin Delano Roosevelt.

The series was broadcast by CBC Television over three nights, from March 27 to March 29, 1988.

== Critical response ==
The series received mixed reviews from television critics. Tony Atherton of the Ottawa Citizen wrote that it functioned better as a documentary than as a drama, but ultimately concluded that "despite its length, and occasional tedium, The King Chronicle provides Canadians with fascinating portrait of a colorful historic figure, and a better understanding of themselves." while Jim Bawden of the Toronto Star praised McCann's performance but opined that "Brittain, a superb moviemaker, should not have written the script. He gets bogged down in the petty politicking of the day and doesn't pay attention to King's emotional battles within himself, reported in the diaries. Brittain's frustration at not being able to pin down the real King grows even as the mini-series dawdles to its end."

Mike Boone of the Montreal Gazette was more positive, writing that "The King Chronicle brings this fascinating man out of the mists of our neglected history, casting harsh, revelatory light on the King character. Viewers will be treated to a thoroughly entertaining and informative account of three tumultuous decades in Canada's history, when events were quietly and slyly manipulated by a political genius. I wish Donald Brittain had been making TV series while I was wasting my youth watching Davy Crockett. I might have begged my parents for a Mackenzie King hat. Brittain is a bona fide genius. The King Chronicle joins Canada's Sweetheart, the brilliant Champions documentary trilogy and the On Guard for Thee series of Cold War analyses as precious TV records of complex events that have shaped modern Canada."

The Toronto Star also asked three Canadian historians for their views of the series. Jack Granatstein called it awful and riddled with errors, Bruce Hutchison was charitable about the need to condense a 55-year political career into a six-hour film but was critical of McCann's performance as not really capturing how King actually conducted himself, while Bernard Ostry praised the series for demystifying King but lamented the inability to provide deeper context for some of his actions.

== Awards ==
Award	Date of ceremony	Category	Nominees	Result	Reference
Gemini Awards	1988	Best Dramatic Miniseries	Adam Symansky	Nominated	
Gemini Awards	1988	Best Supporting Actor in a Drama Program or Series	Gary Reineke	Nominated	
Gemini Awards	1988	Best Supporting Actor in a Drama Program or Series	Sandy Webster	Nominated	
Gemini Awards	1988	Best Sound in a Dramatic Program or Series	Jean-Pierre Joutel, Louis Hone, Julian Olson, Adrian Croll, Hans Oomes	Nominated	
