= Harold Green Jewish Theatre Company =

Canadian professional theatre company

The Harold Green Jewish Theatre Company (HGJT) is a professional non-profit theatre company in Toronto, Ontario, Canada. It is the only non-profit Jewish theatre company in Toronto.

== Background ==
The theatre company was founded in 2006 with a mandate to "illuminate humanity through a Jewish perspective." The company aims to present, celebrate, and preserve stories about Jewish culture, history, and beliefs. In addition to performances, the HGJT also engages in educational outreach programs.

Each season, the HGJT produces 3-5 productions.

The theatre company is also a co-presenter of the Canadian Jewish Playwriting Competition.

== Location ==
The HGJT moved to downtown Toronto in 2011.

== Leadership ==
The HGJT's artistic directors are David Eisner and Avery Saltzman.

== The Barlin-Daniels Emerging Artists Initiative ==
The HGJT, in partnership with theatre company Artists in Residence, launched The Barlin-Daniels Emerging Artists Initiative in order to support and motivate new theatre artists.

== Notable productions ==
A revival of the production Fiddler on the Roof was announced in 2026. It will be directed by Joel Grey. The production will be performed in Yiddish, along with subtitles in English and Russian.

The Children’s Republic ran from May 14-16 in 2025 at the Koffler Centre of the Arts. The play was written by Hannah Moscovitch. It was staged in partnership with the HGTJ.

== Virtual productions ==
During the pandemic, the HGJT used the platform, Virtual Telethon, to stage past performances.

== Productions ==
- Rose (2007/08)
- The Sisters Rosensweig (2007/08)
- Tuesdays With Morrie (2008/09)
- Kindertransport (2008/09)
- Zisele (2008/09)
- Sholom Aleichem: Laughter Through Tears (2009/10)
- The Soul of Gershwin (2009/10)
- Talk (2009/10)
- Lenin’s Embalmers (2010/11 season, co-production with Winnipeg Jewish Theatre)
- Zero Hour (2010/11 season)
- To Life (2010/11 season)
- One of a Kind (2010/11 season)
- Mamaloshen (2011/12 season)
- The Children’s Republic (2011/12 season, co-production with Tarragon Theatre)
- Circumcise Me (2011/12 season)
- Lost In Yonkers (2011/12 season)
- Visiting Mr. Green (2011/12 season)
- Nazi Hunter (2012/13 season)
- Over the Rainbow (2012/13 season)
- The Whipping Man (2012/13 season, produced in association with Obsidian Theatre)
- Falsettos (2012/13 season, produced in association with Acting Up Stage Company)
- …And Stockings For the Ladies (2013/14 season)
- Stars of David (2013/14 season, produced in association with Angel Walk Theatre)
- Funny Girl (fundraiser, 2013/14 season)
- New Jerusalem (2013/14 season)
- There’s No Business Like Irving Berlin (2013/14 season)
- An Israeli Love Story (2013/14 season, direct from Israel)
- Joel Grey: Up Close and Personal (2014/15 season)
- Bella: The Colour of Love (2014/15 season)
- Therefore Choose Life (2014/15 season)
- Driving Miss Daisy (2014/15 season)
- Fabrik: The Legend of M. Rabinowitz (2014/15 season, produced in association with Sara Schwartz Geller Productions)
- Stephen Schwartz (fundraiser, 2014/15 season)
- The Immigrant (2015/16 season)
- The Model Apartment (2015/16 season)
- Golda's Balcony (2015/16 season)
- Kabaret (2015/16 season)
- A Rhapsody In Gershwin (2015/16 season)
- 25 Questions For A Jewish Mother (2015/16 season)
- Rose (by Martin Sherman) (2016/17 season)
- The Jazz Singer (2016/17 season, co-production with Dancap Productions)
- Walk Me To the Corner (2016/17 season)
- Freud's Last Session (2016/17 season)
- A Boy Like That: An Evening of Leonard Bernstein (2016/17 season)
- The Times They Are A Changin’ (2017/18 season)
- My Name is Asher Lev (2017/18 season, co-production with Studio 180 Theatre)
- My Son The Waiter, A Jewish Tragedy! (2017/18 season)
- Mikveh (2017/18 season)
- Two by Two (2017/18 season, co-production with Dancap Productions)
- A Funny Thing Happened on the Way to the Forum (fundraiser, 2017/18 season)
- Bad Jews (2018/19 season)
- Bar Mitzvah Boy (2018/19 season)
- Becoming Dr. Ruth (2018/19 season)
- Knishes ‘n Grits (2018/19 season)
- The Maccabeats: A Chanukah Concert (2018/19 season)
- Streisand x 9 (fundraiser, 2018/19 season)
- Actually (2019/20 season, co-production with Obsidian Theatre Company)
- The Pianist of Willesden Lane (2019/20 season)
- VITALY: An Evening of Wonders (2021/22 season)
- The Great Divide (2021/22 season)
- Knock Knock (2023/24 season)
- An Evening with Robert Klein (2023/24 season)
- In Seven Days (2023/24 season)
- Discovering Allan Sherman (2023/24 season)
- The Shoah Songbook (2023/24 season)
- Tikkun Olam (2023/24 season)
- Trayf (2024/25 season)
- Cohen & King (2024/25 season)
- The Runner (2024/25 season)
- Estelle Singerman (2024/25 season)
- Words & Music (2024/25 season)
- Simon & Garfunkel (2025/26 season)
- Without an Evil Eye (2025/26 season)
- How Do We Get Out of Here? (2025/26 season)
- Fiddler on the Roof in Yiddish (2025/26 season)
