= Brian McKenna =

Canadian film director (1945–2023)

Brian McKenna (August 8, 1945 – May 5, 2023) was a Canadian documentary film director. He directed films on Canadian history and explorations of the world at war.

== Biography ==
Brian McKenna was born on August 8, 1945 in Montreal, Canada

McKenna was a founding producer of CBC's Oscar and Emmy award-winning documentary program, The Fifth Estate, where he worked from 1975 to 1988. McKenna was a parliamentary correspondent for the Montreal Star. He was a frequent collaborator with his brother Terence, also a filmmaker, in particular on the three-part series The Valour and the Horror. The most controversial segment in the series concerned strategic bombing during World War II.

McKenna's contributions included prize-winning films about Canada's wars, including the War of 1812, the First and Second World Wars, and Korea. Among his documentary film achievements, McKenna also co-authored the Penguin Books biography of Montreal mayor Jean Drapeau.

McKenna wrote for Saturday Night, Weekend Magazine, the Literary Review of Canada, Cité Libre, the Toronto Star and Maclean's.

McKenna died on May 5, 2023, from an illness at the age of 77.

== Filmography and awards ==
McKenna was awarded a combined nine Gemini and prix Gemeaux awards and was the winner of a lifetime achievement Gemini and the Pierre Berton Prize for Canadian History. He has received three Nellie awards for best documentary writing. His hour-long 1983 investigation on the assassination of JFK drew the largest audiences for The Fifth Estate in the show's history.

"In many respects, Brian McKenna's extensive commitment to broadcasting Canada's stories laid the groundwork for future major television projects with Canadian history at their core. But what makes him so honourable to me, is his passion to telling exceptional stories of everyday Canadians – so that all of us can better see ourselves in our history," said Deborah Morrison, president and C.E.O. of Canada's National History Society, who bestows the annual Pierre Berton award.

His work on the controversial documentary series, The Valour and the Horror, with his brother Terence McKenna, uniquely earned prizes for Best Direction, Best Writing and Best Documentary Series in English and French (Prix Gemeaux).

Denounced by England's tabloid press, the series caused an uproar when it was shown in Great Britain, winning acclaim from The Guardian, The Times and The Telegraph: "It was a brave film to make" wrote novelist A.N. Wilson, "and a brave film to show."

Pierre Trudeau: The Memoirs was broadcast in both official languages and won the prix Gemeaux for Best Doctumentary Series in 1994.

In 1987 he was a producer of the television crime drama film And Then You Die.

The Hooded Men, his film on torture, won the top prize at the American Film Festival and was employed by Amnesty International in their stop torture campaign.

His film on CIA brainwashing at a Montreal psychiatric hospital, Secret Tests, landed on the front page of The New York Times, provoking debate in the U.S. Congress and Parliament. It won the gold medal for Investigative Journalism at the New York Television and Film Festival.

A Journey Back, McKenna's documentary on the Holocaust, led to a prosecution under Canada's war crime law. A finalist with the Nellie for best television program, the film won the Blue Ribbon at the American Film Festival and the Nellie for best documentary.

Involving the descendants of Great War soldiers and nurses recreating the battles of Vimy Ridge and Passendale, McKenna's series on Canada and the Great War is called a "groundbreaking" achievement.

=== Other notable documentaries ===
- The Bribe or the Bullet, (1996) a documentary on narco-trafficking, political assassinations and corruption in Mexico for CBC's Witness series
- Fire and Ice: The Rocket Richard Riot (2000) focusing on a seven-hour long riot that took place in 1955 after the president of the NHL suspended Montreal Canadiens legend Maurice "The Rocket" Richard
- Korea: The Unfinished War (2003) where McKenna gained special access in North Korea, a nation he calls "one of the scariest places on earth." The documentary explored North Korean charges that the United States persistently attempted biological warfare
- Big Sugar (2005) exploring the roots of the sugar industry, sugar cartels, slaves in the fields of the Dominican Republic and slaves to the sugar-based diet
- The Secret World of Gold (2015) exploring the power and corruption of the ancient glittering element
