= Wayne Grigsby =

Canadian screenwriter and producer

Wayne Grigsby (born 1947) is a Canadian screenwriter and producer, mainly for television.

== Career ==
Grigsby, who comes from Calgary, Alberta, started primarily in arts and entertainment journalism. His goal had always been to write fiction. And Then You Die, his debut screenplay, was produced by Brian McKenna and Bernard Zukerman, and was broadcast by CBC Television in 1987.

Later, he formed Big Motion Pictures Inc. with David MacLeod. He also tried American TV with a failed pilot starring Kelly McGillis.

== Awards ==
- 2004 Margaret Collier Award

== Partial filmography ==
=== Producer ===
- North of 60 (1992; TV series)
- Dark Eyes (1995; TV series)
- Black Harbour (1996, TV series)
- A Guy and a Girl (2002; TV series)
- Snakes & Ladders (2004; TV series)
- Sex Traffic (2004; two-part miniseries)
- October 1970 (2006; eight-part miniseries)

=== Writer ===
- And Then You Die (1987)
- Task Force: Caviar (2000)
- Trudeau (2002)
- Trudeau II: Maverick in the Making (2005)
