= Hoover vs. The Kennedys =

- Genre: Historical drama
- Written by: Michael O'Herlihy; Lionel E. Siege
- No. of episodes: 4

Production
- Producers: Paul Saltzman; Daniel Selznick; Joe Glickman
- Production locations: Toronto, Ontario
- Production company: Operation Prime Time

Original release
- Release: 1987 – 1987

Hoover vs. The Kennedys: The Second Civil War is a four-hour 1987 made-for-television mini-series depicting the political struggles between FBI Director J. Edgar Hoover and President John F. Kennedy and Attorney General Robert F. Kennedy. The series was produced by Operation Prime Time.

== Synopsis ==
The film takes place between the 1960 Democratic National Convention in July 1960 and the assassination of Robert F. Kennedy in June 1968, with the majority of the mini-series focusing on the Kennedy Administration (1961–1963).

Other sub-plots include Bobby Kennedy's frustration with his elder brother's politically risky womanizing and his often turbulent relationship with Hoover and the Civil Rights leadership of the era. The mini-series also touches on the alleged bargains Joseph P. Kennedy Sr. made with Mafia figures in order to get his son elected to the U.S. presidency.

== Production ==
Hoover vs. The Kennedys was primarily filmed on location in and around Toronto, Ontario.

== Cast ==
- Robert Pine as John F. Kennedy
- Nicholas Campbell as Robert F. Kennedy
- Jack Warden as J. Edgar Hoover
- Richard Anderson as Lyndon B. Johnson
- Barry Morse as Joseph P. Kennedy Sr.
- Marc Strange as Clyde Tolson
- Leland Gantt as Martin Luther King Jr.
- Djanet Sears as Coretta Scott King
- Heather Thomas as Marilyn Monroe
- Jennifer Dale as Jacqueline Kennedy
- Nicholas Walker as Peter Lawford
- Brioni Farrell as Judith Campbell

== See also ==
- Kennedy (miniseries)
- Prince Jack
- The Kennedys (miniseries)
- Cultural depictions of John F. Kennedy
- Robert F. Kennedy in media
