= Blades of Courage =

- Written by: Suzette Couture
- Directed by: Randy Bradshaw
- Starring: Christianne Hirt; Rosemary Dunsmore; Patricia Hamilton; Cec Linder; Colm Feore
- Music by: Eric N. Robertson
- Country of origin: Canada
- Original language: English

Production
- Producer: Alan Burkey
- Cinematography: Norman C. Allin; Michael Storey
- Running time: 98 minutes

Original release
- Release: 1987

Blades of Courage (also known as Skate!) is a 1987 Canadian made-for-television movie written by Suzette Couture and directed by Randy Bradshaw. The film was released under the name Skate! and first aired on the Canadian Broadcasting Corporation network. It won the 1988 Gemini Award for Best TV Movie.

== Plot ==
The film is about Lori Laroche, a young figure skater from Peterborough, Ontario. In her debut at the 1985 Canadian Figure Skating Championships, Laroche (Christianne Hirt) places third. At the banquet to announce the team that will attend the World Figure Skating Championships, Stuart Carmody (Cec Linder) the president of the Canadian Figure Skating Association, decides to send Christa Simmons, the Canadian champion, and Laroche instead of the silver medalist, Tara Lynn (Shelley-Lynn Owens).

Tara Lynn's coach, Bruce Gainor (Colm Feore) is furious, and pulls Carmody aside. Carmody assures Gainor this is a good idea. Carmody also tells Gainor the CFSA would like to team up Gainor and Laroche.

After a rough start in the compulsories, Laroche places 10th overall at the worlds after the freeskate. The Canadian Figure Skating Association offers to pay for her training costs and new coach, Bruce Gainor, in Toronto. Laroche's overbearing mom, Carla (Rosemary Dunsmore) is excited, while her dad, Ron (Tom Butler) is less than thrilled at the idea of their young daughter moving away from home in the middle of the school year. Reluctantly, Ron agrees. At the Peterborough Arena, Carla tells Anna Petrie (Patricia Hamilton) about the coaching change. Anna is upset, and she tells Carla both of them have been fired and the CFSA is in charge now.

Gainor's coaching techniques are tough compared to how Laroche was treated by her old coach. No matter what Gainor does, nothing will make Laroche cave to his training methods. He tells David Frye (Stuart Hughes) he's going to "nuke" her. Gainor signs Laroche up for Skate Hamilton. After Laroche skaters, Gainor starts to point out the flaws in her program and character until Laroche is crying and screaming. He comforts Laroche after his outburst.

Gainor and choreographer, Denise, come up with a plan for Laroche to do a triple Salchow in her program for Canadians. Even though Laroche protests, Gainor is adamant she does it. When Laroche falls, Gainor tells her, "if you fall, you repeat the jump again and again until you get it right." As Denise is about to leave the ice, Gainor says he'd like to see her in his office.

Laroche meets Donny Hackett (Stephen Marshall) in school. Laroche is walking out of a classroom after a teacher is reprimanding her for falling asleep in class. Hackett asks Laroche for an autograph, and she scribes down a profane note. Despite Laroche's snubs, Hackett keeps trying to flirt with Laroche.

Laroche finds out her parents are splitting up after a visit with Carla. Laroche blames her mom for the divorce, and returns to the arena. Laroche walks into Gainor's office and tells him about the divorce. Gainor uses the fact that Laroche is vulnerable to his advantage. He kisses her and makes Laroche believe he is interested in her. Frye catches them just as Laroche is leaving Gainor's office.

Laroche continues to have trouble with the triple Salchow, and eventually gets injured. Gainor yells at Laroche to try it again, and "show me some guts for a change." Laroche lands it and is showered with attention by Gainor. Tara Lynn sees this and turns away. Tara Lynn compliments Laroche on the program. Then make a comment about Denise and Gainor, and their meetings, indicating they are of an intimate nature. Laroche goes to investigate, and finds Gainor and Denise fooling around. Laroche starts to lose focus and is unable to land her triple Salchow. She shows up at Hackett's garage late one night and kisses him. The next day Laroche is again unable to land her triple Salchow. Gainor starts to yell at Laroche, and Laroche screams back hysterically. After the session, Frye chasing after Gainor, and Gainor ends up firing Frye.

Before Canadian, Laroche must make it through sectionals. Members of the CFSA board are concerned about Laroche; however, Gainor calms their nerves about her health and the program. Hackett is in the audience with a friend. Laroche takes to the ice and enters her triple Salchow and falls. She goes away from her choreography, and repeats the jump. Again, she falls. She repeats the jump, again and again until the end of her music.

Gainor storms into the changing room and yells at Laroche. She is stone faced. He tells her she is finished, and nobody will touch her. Tara Lynn comes into the changing room and questions how Laroche could do that. Tara Lynn tells Laroche not to end her career like this. Laroche is greeted on the ice by Hackett driving through the back entrance of the arena. They drive to a motel. At the motel, it's indicated they have sex and smoke pot. The owner of the hotel calls the cops on them, and Hackett and Laroche are allegedly arrest. Gainor and Carmody wait outside the police station arguing about what happened with Laroche's career. Laroche exits the police station, and Carmody begs her not to quit skating. Laroche says just wants to go home.

Laroche moves back home to live with Carla and her sister, Kyra (Alyson Court) in a two-bedroom apartment. Laroche visits Anne at the Peterborough Arena and tells her what happened. Anne tells Laroche "they loved the gift, but not the gifted one." Laroche eventually goes through a depression and tells Carla it's her fault she doesn't have anything else in her life but figure skating. Carla tells Laroche figure skating destroyed her marriage, so she doesn't have anything else either. Eventually, Laroche starts to work and become herself again. Hackett shows up at the donut show where she works to see if she still is interested in him. They get back together.

After watching the 1986 World Figure Skating Championships, Laroche apologizes to her mom for everything. One night, Laroche goes to the Peterborough Arena to try and skate again. She realizes how much she misses it. Laroche asks Frye to be her coach. He agrees.

At sectionals, even though Laroche can land a triple Salchow, she falls on her first jump, a double Axel, in the beginning of her program and becomes injured. As a result, Laroche doesn't qualify for the Canadians. Frye meets with Carmody and Betty Widmer (Wanda Cannon) of the CFSA to see if she can get a bye. Widmer wants her to have the bye; however, Carmody is not so sure.

Laroche is given the bye and attends the 1987 Canadian Figure Skating Championships. She meets up with Tara Lynn, who is current Canadian champion. Tara Lynn tells Laroche she doesn't stand a chance. Laroche is the last skater, and she is waiting in the changing room when Gainor walks in. At first, he says he's there to wish her luck. Then, Gainor tries to mentally sabotage her. She tells him it won't work and he lost out with one of Canada's top skaters. Laroche tells him after she skates nobody will want anything to do with him. Laroche leaves Gainor in the changing room.

Frye prepares Laroche to take the ice as Carmody, Widmer, Carla, Kyra, Ron, Anna, and Donny look on from the audience. Gainor, Denise and Tara Lynn are watching Laroche from the Kiss and Cry. Laroche skates her program, and Gainor looks on in amazement at her improvement. Laroche's final jump is a one-foot axel – split jump – triple Salchow sequence. Tara Lynn is shown crying into Gainor's jacket while he consoles. Laroche wins the 1987 Canadian championships.

== Cast ==
- Christianne Hirt as Lori Laroche
- Rosemary Dunsmore as Carla Laroche
- Patricia Hamilton as Anna Petrie
- Cec Linder as Stuart Carmody
- Colm Feore as Bruce Gainor
- Stuart Hughes as David Frye
- Alyson Court as Kyra Laroche
- Jim Jones as Paul Madden
- Lynn Nightingale as Lori Laroche's stunt double
- Tom Butler as Ron Laroche
- Stephen Marshall as Donny Hackett
- Tom Harvey as Phil Whittall
- Wanda Cannon as Betty Widmer
- Elizabeth Lennie as Sue Eickart
- Shelley-Lynn Owens as Tara Lynn
- Kelly Judge as Stunt Skater [uncredited]

== Recognition ==
=== Awards and nominations ===
The film received recognition in 1988 by Gemini Awards, receiving Gemini wins for "Best TV Movie", and "Best Writing in a Dramatic Program or Mini-Series".

== Reception ==
The Video Movie Guide 1998 gave Blades of Courage three and a half stars and said that "Aside from the stereotyped pushy mother, this is a realistic film that reveals the effort involved in developing a champion."
