= Nolan Miller =

American costume designer (1933–2012)

- Born: January 8, 1933; Burkburnett, Texas, U.S.
- Died: June 7, 2012 (aged 79); Woodland Hills, Los Angeles, California, U.S.
- Occupations: Fashion and jewelry designer
- Years active: 1975–2011
- Spouse: Sandra Stream Miller (m. 1980; div. 1993)

Nolan Bertrandoff Miller (January 8, 1933 – June 7, 2012) was an American fashion and jewelry designer on QVC and a television costume designer best known for his work on the long-running 1980s series Dynasty, its spin-off series The Colbys and the 1991 miniseries Dynasty: The Reunion. He collaborated on many projects with television producers Aaron Spelling and Douglas S. Cramer, including Charlie's Angels, The Love Boat, Fantasy Island, Hotel, Hart to Hart, and Vega$.

== Early life ==
Miller was born at Burkburnett, Texas in 1933. He was the fourth of five children born to William and Marie Miller. Nolan later stated, "When I was about in the 5th or the 6th grade I made up my mind I fell in love with movies and I thought I want to design gorgeous costumes for gorgeous stars and it was my lifelong ambition. I never wanted anything else. I never changed". He worked in the oil fields of Texas and Louisiana after high school. His family moved at least twice before settling in San Bernardino, California. He studied design at the Chouinard Art Institute, now the California Institute of the Arts. Unable to find work in the entertainment industry, he worked in a florist shop in Beverly Hills, where he met Aaron Spelling, who hired Miller to design clothes for the various television series.

== Career ==
Miller designed costumes for multiple Spelling-produced television series, including Charlie's Angels, The Love Boat and Green Acres, but is best known as the costume designer for the 1980s prime time soap opera Dynasty, and related series. His designs, in particular those made for the characters Alexis Colby (Joan Collins) and Dominique Deveraux (Diahann Carroll), set a fashion trend for thick shoulder pads, power suits and "old-Hollywood-style wardrobe of sequined gowns, luncheon suits, wide-brimmed hats, frivolous veils, fur stoles and the occasional turban." Other iconic costumes by Miller include Morticia Addams's signature dress on The Addams Family, Ginger Grant's beaded gown on Gilligan's Island, and gowns featured by various legendary stars who participated in a MGM Musicals Tribute at the 1986 Academy Awards.

From 1983 to 1987, Miller was nominated six times for an Emmy Award. Nominated four times for Dynasty, he won a 1984 Primetime Emmy Award for Outstanding Costumes for a Series for the soap opera. He was also nominated in 1985 for the Elizabeth Taylor television movie Malice in Wonderland, and in 1987 for The Two Mrs. Grenvilles, starring Ann-Margret and Claudette Colbert.

Christopher Schemering notes in The Soap Opera Encyclopedia that "[t]he Nolan Miller creations became so popular that Dynasty spawned its own line of women's apparel", and later a men's fashion line. "The Dynasty Collection," was a series of fashion designs based on costumes worn by Joan Collins, Linda Evans, Stephanie Beacham and Diahann Carroll. Miller maintained a career as a private couturier in Beverly Hills, California, with clients including Taylor, Collins, Sophia Loren and Bette Davis, for whom he designed the red dress that she wore to receive the César Award in France. Miller's office was adorned with autographs of his favorite stars and sketches of these famous costumes, illustrated by his collaborator and sketch artist Donna Peterson, who had previously worked for Helen Rose.

For two decades he designed a line of jewelry for QVC. A 2005 collaboration with Joan Rivers and Kenneth Jay Lane, the Scoundrel Collection, was designed for the Broadway production of the musical Dirty Rotten Scoundrels. The collection was presented on QVC with an April 25, 2005 broadcast and sold at the Imperial Theatre's concessionaire.

In 2000, he received the Costume Designers Guild Career Achievement Award.

== Personal life and death ==
In 1980, Miller married Sandra Stream, the daughter of one of his private clients, New Orleans socialite Matilda Gray Stream. They divorced in 1993.

Miller was diagnosed with lung cancer in 2006. He announced his retirement on July 4, 2011 on QVC. Friend and actress Joan Collins broke the news that Miller had died in his sleep in Woodland Hills, California on June 6, 2012; he was 79 years old. He was predeceased by his ex-wife, Sandra, who died in November 2011; they had no children.

== Selected credits ==
- These Old Broads (2001) (TV)
- Titans (2000–01) (TV)
- Sunset Beach (1997) (TV) (jewelry designing and furnishing)
- Pacific Palisades (1997) (TV)
- Models Inc (1994–95) (TV)
- Dynasty: The Reunion (1991) (TV)
- Soapdish (1991)
- Peter Gunn (1958) (TV)
- Skin Deep (1989)
- Malice in Wonderland (1985) (TV)
- Hollywood Wives (1985) (TV miniseries)
- The Colbys (1985-1987) (TV)
- Making of a Male Model (1983) (TV)
- Hotel (1983–88) (TV)
- Don't Go to Sleep (1982) (TV)
- Bare Essence (1982) (TV)
- Paper Dolls (1982) (TV)
- T.J. Hooker (1982–86) (TV)
- Matt Houston (1982–1985) (TV)
- Dynasty (1981–89) (TV)
- Honey West (1965) (TV)
- Hart to Hart (1979–84) (TV)
- Lady of the House (1978)
- Charlie's Angels (1976–81) (TV)
- Folies Bergere at The Tropicana Hotel Las Vegas (1975) (Vegas Revue)
