= Eileen and Robert Mason Pollock =

American wife-and-husband television writer duo and producer duo

Eileen Prince Pollock
- Born: March 22, 1926
- Died: December 5, 2012 (aged 86); Palm Springs, California, U.S.
- Occupations: Screenwriter; Producer

Robert Mason Pollock
- Born: March 19, 1917; Atlanta, Georgia, U.S.
- Died: July 11, 2016 (aged 99); Palm Springs, California, U.S.
- Occupations: Screenwriter; Producer
- Notable work: Dynasty; The Colbys; The Doctors; General Hospital; Robert Montgomery Presents; U.S. Steel hour Philco Playhouse; Hallmark Hall of Fame; Gen. Dwight D. Eisenhower’s chief of public radio relations
- Awards: Golden Palm Star on the Palm Springs, California, Walk of Stars

Eileen "Mike" Prince Pollock (March 22, 1926 – December 5, 2012) and Robert "Bob" Mason Pollock (March 19, 1917 – July 11, 2016) were an American married couple who worked as television screenwriters and producers best known for work on the series Dynasty and its spin-off series The Colbys, the latter of which the Pollocks co-created with Dynasty creators Richard and Esther Shapiro.

The second-season additions of the Pollocks and actress Joan Collins (in the role of Alexis) are generally credited with Dynasty's subsequent rise in the ratings; it became the number one series in 1985. According to The Soap Opera Encyclopedia written by Christopher Schemering, the Pollocks "soft-pedaled the business angle" of the show and "bombarded viewers with every soap opera staple in the book, presented at such a fast clip that a new tragedy seemed to befall the Carrington family every five minutes."

The Pollocks brought the daytime series The Doctors its highest ratings in the early 1970s. They also wrote for General Hospital from 1976 to 1977. In 1997, a Golden Palm Star on the Palm Springs, California, Walk of Stars was dedicated to them.

On December 5, 2012, six months after Eileen Pollock "suffered a massive stroke", her obituary was published in The Desert Sun of Coachella Valley.

Robert Pollock died on July 11, 2016 in Palm Springs. He was 99 years old. His obituary is published in The Desert Sun.
