= Beacon Hill (TV series) =

1975 American period drama TV series

- Genre: Drama
- Composer: Marvin Hamlisch
- Country of origin: United States
- Original language: English
- No. of seasons: 1
- No. of episodes: 11 (+2 unaired)

Production
- Executive producer: Beryl Vertue
- Producer: Jacqueline Babbin
- Running time: 60 minutes
- Production company: Robert Stigwood Organization

Original release
- Network: CBS
- Release: August 25 – November 4, 1975

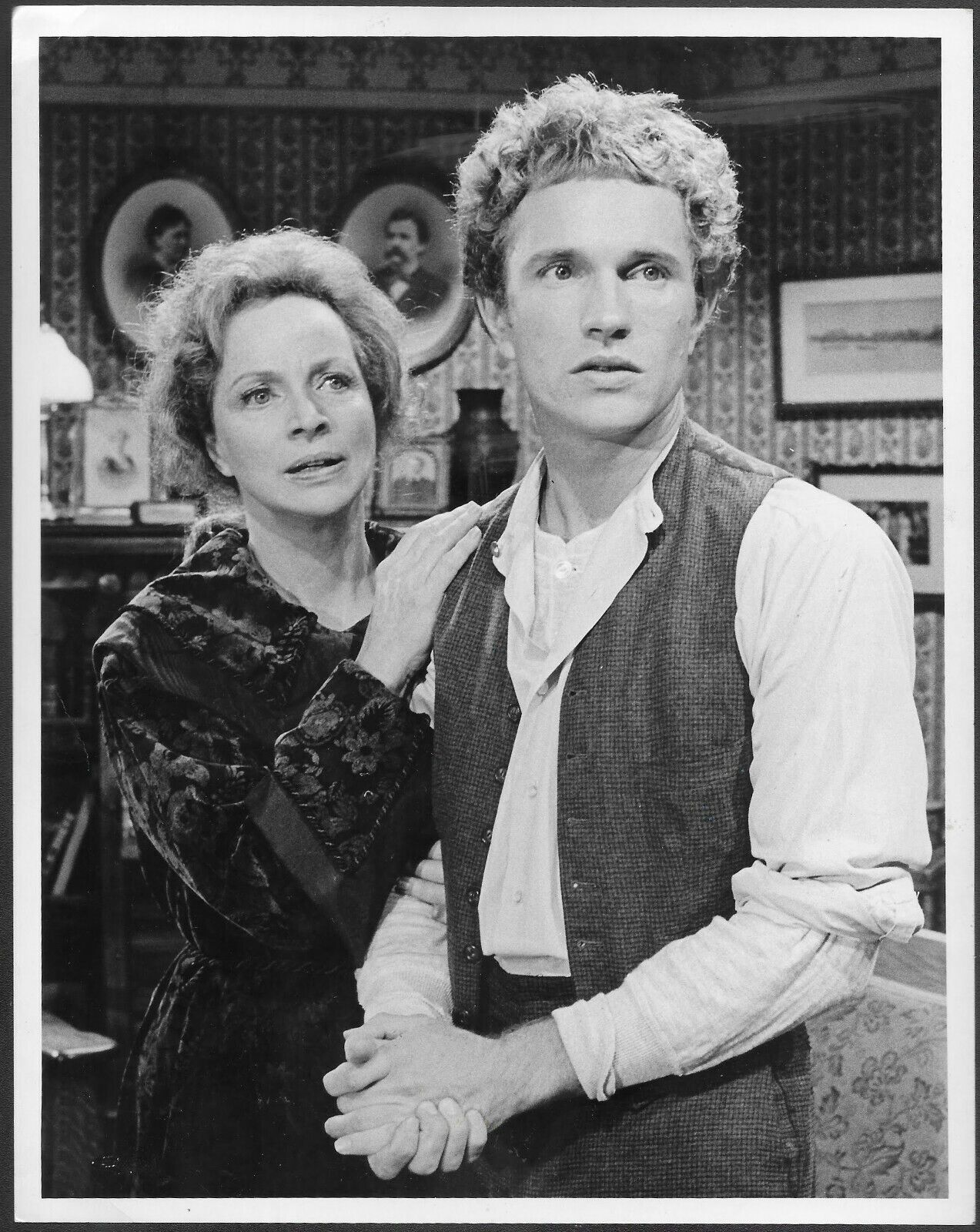
Beatrice Straight & Paul Ryan Rudd in a Beacon Hill episode from 1975

Beacon Hill is a prime time period drama series which aired on CBS in 1975. Set after World War I in Boston's Beacon Hill area, the show was conceived as an Americanized version of the popular British series Upstairs, Downstairs (1971–1975) and focused on the wealthy Irish-American Lassiter family and their Irish immigrant servants, who reside together on Louisburg Square.

The show was produced by Jacqueline Babbin and Beryl Vertue, the former literary agent of Upstairs, Downstairs co-creator Jean Marsh.

== Production ==
The first episode cost $900,000 to produce, and the music was composed by Marvin Hamlisch. Christopher Schemering of The Soap Opera Encyclopedia called Beacon Hill "the most touted prime-time soap since the Lana Turner-George Hamilton debacle The Survivors".

The series premiered on August 25, 1975, with an "impressive audience" of "43% of people watching TV" that evening, but it could not sustain those ratings. Schemering wrote that "the overly large cast and fragmented stories did not allow the audience to get its bearings." The show was cancelled after 11 weeks (two further episodes remained unaired) with its last episode airing on November 4, 1975.

== Cast and characters ==
The show starred Stephen Elliott as patriarch Benjamin Lassiter, a self-made businessman and éminence grise at Boston City Hall, and Nancy Marchand as his wife Mary, an elegant society woman from a wealthy family. They have five children; eldest daughter Maude (Maeve McGuire), who is married to yachting enthusiast Richard Palmer (Edward Herrmann); middle daughter Emily (DeAnn Mears), who is married to stockbroker Trevor Bullock (Roy Cooper) and is the mother of the spoilt Betsy (Linda Purl); "plain jane" Rosamond (Kitty Winn), who helps out the family business; bohemian Fawn (Kathryn Walker), who is having an affair with her Italian piano teacher Giorgio Bellonci (Michael Nouri); and Robert, the Lassiters’ only son, who has returned from France after losing an arm in World War I.

The servants consist of Arthur Hacker (George Rose), the family butler; his wife Emmeline (Beatrice Straight), the head housekeeper; his niece Maureen Mahaffey (Susan Blanchard), who works as a maid; his nephew Brian Mallory (Paul Ryan Rudd), the chauffeur who is having an affair with Rosamond; former chauffeur Harry Emmet (Barry Snider); footman Terence O'Hara (David Rounds); cook William Piper (Richard Ward) and his son Grant (Don Blakely); Marilyn Gardiner (Holland Taylor), Mary's personal assistant and secretary; and maids Eleanor (Sydney Swire) and Kate (Lisa Pelikan).

== Episodes ==
No.	Title	Directed by	Written by	Original release date	US viewers (millions)
1	"Pilot"	Fielder Cook	Sidney Carroll	August 25, 1975	23.1
2	"The Colonel and the Fawn"	Burt Brinckerhoff	Irving Gaynor Neiman	September 2, 1975	17.6
3	"The Marblehead Club"	Peter Levin	David Wiltse	September 9, 1975	14.6
4	"The Poor Little Thing"	Peter Levin	Story by : Sidney Carroll; Teleplay by : David Wiltse	September 16, 1975	15.2
5	"The Soldiers"	Peter Levin	David Wiltse	September 23, 1975	12.2
6	"The Shining Example"	Peter Levin	Sidney Carroll	September 30, 1975	14.3
7	"The Speakeasy"	Peter Levin	David Wiltse	October 7, 1975	12.7
8	"The Million Dollar Gate"	Peter Levin	Allan Sloane	October 14, 1975	9.7
9	"The Suitors"	Paul Lammers	David Wiltse	October 21, 1975	8.2
10	"The Test"	Peter Levin	Story by : Sidney Carroll; Teleplay by : George Baxt	October 28, 1975	10.8
11	"The Pretenders"	Mel Ferber	Story by : Anne Howard Bailey; Teleplay by : Irving Gaynor Neiman	November 4, 1975	10.5
12	"The Debut"	unknown	unknown	unaired	unaired
13	"The Visit"	unknown	unknown	unaired	unaired
