= Dynasty (1981 TV series) season 6 =

Dynasty
- Season 6
- No. of episodes: 31

Release
- Original network: ABC
- Original release: September 25, 1985 – May 21, 1986

Season chronology
- ← Previous; Season 5 Next → Season 7

The sixth season of Dynasty originally aired in the United States on ABC from September 25, 1985, through May 21, 1986. The series, created by Richard and Esther Shapiro and produced by Aaron Spelling, revolves around the Carringtons, a wealthy family residing in Denver, Colorado.

Season six stars John Forsythe as millionaire oil magnate Blake Carrington; Linda Evans as his wife Krystle; Jack Coleman as Blake and Alexis's earnest son Steven; Gordon Thomson as Blake and Alexis' eldest son Adam; Pamela Bellwood as Steven's ex-wife, Claudia; Heather Locklear as Krystle's niece and Steven's ex-wife Sammy Jo; Michael Nader as Alexis's husband Dex Dexter; Catherine Oxenberg as Blake and Alexis' youngest daughter, Amanda; Michael Praed as Amanda's husband Prince Michael of Moldavia; Diahann Carroll as Blake's half-sister Dominique Deveraux; Ted McGinley as Clay Fallmont; and Joan Collins as Alexis Colby, Blake's ex-wife and the mother of Adam, Fallon, Steven and Amanda. The season also features Maxwell Caulfield as Jeff's cousin, Miles Colby; Christopher Cazenove as Blake's brother, Ben Carrington; Kate O'Mara as Alexis' sister Caress Morell; and George Hamilton as con man Joel Abrigore.

A spin-off series, The Colbys, was launched in November 1985, starring John James and Emma Samms as their Dynasty characters, Jeff Colby and Fallon Carrington. To set up the new series, Dynasty introduced the series regulars of The Colbys, including Charlton Heston as wealthy Colby Enterprises CEO Jason Colby; Stephanie Beacham as his wife Sable; Tracy Scoggins as their daughter Monica, twin sister to Miles; Claire Yarlett as Bliss Colby; Jason and Sable's youngest daughter; Barbara Stanwyck as Jason's sister Constance Colby; and Ricardo Montalbán as shipping tycoon Zach Powers.

== Development ==
The season six premiere episode "The Aftermath" garnered a 28.1 rating, higher than any other episode in the entire series, as viewers wanted to see who survived the "Moldavian Massacre" cliffhanger from the season five finale. The only casualties were Steven's boyfriend Luke Fuller (William Campbell), and Jeff's love interest Lady Ashley Mitchell (Ali MacGraw). In the 2006 CBS special Dynasty Reunion: Catfights & Caviar, Gordon Thomson stated that it was the "follow-up" that was the letdown, not the cliffhanger itself. John James stated in the 2001 episode of E! True Hollywood Story featuring Dynasty that the Moldavian Massacre was when the show "maxed out" and "overdosed" on outrageousness. Joan Collins was conspicuously absent from the season six opener, as she was in a tense contract renegotiation with the show, seeking an increased salary. She returned to the series in the season's second episode.

Although still a top ten series, Dynasty dropped from first to seventh place in the ratings for its sixth season. A spin-off series, The Colbys, was launched in November 1985, starring John James and Emma Samms as their Dynasty characters, Jeff Colby and Fallon Carrington.

== Plot ==
Spurned by Blake, Alexis finds his estranged brother Ben and the duo successfully plot to strip Blake of his fortune. Alexis' sister Caress Morell also appears and causes problems for Alexis. Steven's budding relationship with the closeted Bart Fallmont (Kevin Conroy) is ruined by Adam's business-motivated public revelation that Bart is gay. Krystle is held hostage and replaced by lookalike Rita (also played by Evans), who is working with a con man to rob Blake. Amanda, who has divorced Prince Michael, fights with Sammy Jo for the favors of Clay Fallmont. The May 21, 1986 season finale finds Blake strangling Alexis while the rest of the cast is in peril at the La Mirage hotel, which has been accidentally set afire by Claudia.

== Cast ==
=== Main ===
- John Forsythe as Blake Carrington
- Linda Evans as Krystle Carrington (Note: Evans also plays Krystle's look-a-like Rita Lesley for 17 episodes.)
- John James as Jeff Colby (Note: James, Samms and Caulfield depart in "The Decision" (ep. 6.8) to join the cast of The Colbys. Samms and Caulfield return for "Souvenirs" (ep. 6.18).)
- Pamela Bellwood as Claudia Carrington (Note: Bellwood departs in "The Accident" (ep. 6.17) for maternity leave. She returns from "The Subpoenas" (ep. 6.23).)
- Gordon Thomson as Adam Carrington
- Jack Coleman as Steven Carrington
- Michael Nader as Dex Dexter
- Catherine Oxenberg as Amanda Carrington
- Michael Praed as Prince Michael of Moldavia (Note: Praed does not appear in "The Divorce" (ep. 6.19), and departs in "The Dismissal" (ep. 6.20).)
- Emma Samms as Fallon Carrington Colby
- Heather Locklear as Sammy Jo Carrington (Note: Locklear and Carroll appear on a semi-regular basis, missing the occasional episode.)
- Maxwell Caulfield as Miles Colby
- George Hamilton as Joel Abrigore (Note: Hamilton is added to the opening credits from "The Homecoming" (ep. 6.2), credited as "special guest star". He departs in "The Accident" (ep. 6.17).)
- Ted McGinley as Clay Fallmont (Note: McGinley appears on a semi-regular basis from "Masquerade" (ep. 6.22).)
- Christopher Cazenove as Ben Carrington (Note: Cazenove is added to the opening credits from "Ben" (ep. 6.21).)
- Kate O'Mara as Caress Morell (Note: O'Mara first appears as a guest star in "Suspicions" (ep. 6.14) and "The Alarm" (ep. 6.15) before appearing in the opening credits from "Souvenirs" (ep. 6.18), except for "The Triple-Cross" (ep. 6.30).)
- Ken Howard as Garrett Boydston (Note: Howard appears on a semi-regular basis from "The Titans" (ep. 6.6).)
- Diahann Carroll as Dominique Deveraux
- Ricardo Montalbán as Zach Powers (Note: Montalban is added to the opening credits for "Souvenirs" (ep. 6.18) only, credited as "special guest star".)
- Joan Collins as Alexis Colby

Special appearance by (Note: The following actors are credited in the opening of "The Titans" (ep. 6.6. & 6.7) to set up the spin-off show The Colbys (along with future Colbys cast members Caulfield and Howard). Heston and Stanwyck also appear in "The Californians" (ep. 6.3) and "The Man" (ep. 6.4).)

- Charlton Heston as Jason Colby
- Barbara Stanwyck as Constance Colby
- Stephanie Beacham as Sable Colby
- Tracy Scoggins as Monica Colby
- Claire Yarlett as Bliss Colby

=== Recurring ===
- William Beckley as Gerard
- Joel Fabiani as King Galen of Moldavia
- Troy Beyer as Jackie Deveraux
- Kevin Conroy as Bart Fallmont
- Calvin Lockhart as Jonathan Lake
- Kerry Armstrong as Elena, Duchess of Branagh
- Patricia Crowley as Emily Fallmont
- Virginia Hawkins as Jeanette Robbins
- Betty Harford as Hilda Gunnerson
- Theodore Bikel as Warnick
- Richard Anderson as Buck Fallmont

=== Notable guest stars ===
- James Sutorious as Gordon Wales
- Anthony Zerbe as Crenshaw
- Soon Tek-Oh as Kai Liu
- Kabir Bedi as Farouk Ahmed
- William Campbell as Luke Fuller
- Hank Brandt as Morgan Hess

Cast notes

== Episodes ==
The Colbys was spun off Dynasty during season six.

No. overall	No. in season	Title	Directed by	Written by	Original release date	Prod. code	Rating/share (households)
118	1	"The Aftermath"	Robert Scheerer	Story by : Diana Gould; Teleplay by : Edward De Blasio	September 25, 1985	DY-116	28.1/42
The attack at Michael and Amanda's wedding leaves Lady Mitchell and Luke dead. Alexis goes missing after the attack; meanwhile, the rest of the wedding party is held captive in the palace. Sammy Jo reveals her plan to have Rita impersonate Krystle so that Sammy Jo can get control of the money her father left her. In Los Angeles, Fallon meets Miles Colby. Michael is told that his father is dead, but when Krystle discovers that it is not true, she is imprisoned in the palace dungeon.
119	2	"The Homecoming"	Kim Friedman	Story by : Diana Gould; Teleplay by : Dennis Turner	October 2, 1985	DY-117	23.4/35
Blake secures Krystle and Alexis's release and everyone returns to Denver for Luke Fuller's funeral. Adam presses Claudia to marry him. Alexis is convinced that King Galen is still alive. Sammy Jo meets Rita's boyfriend, Joel Abrigore.
120	3	"The Californians"	Gwen Arner	Story by : Diana Gould; Teleplay by : Edward De Blasio	October 9, 1985	DY-118	22.5/34
Blake decides to enter into business with Jason Colby, Jeff's estranged uncle. Dex is angry when Alexis hints that he go on a mission to rescue King Galen. Rita seeks plastic surgery to look more like Krystle. As Fallon and Miles grow closer, Jeff receives a call from his aunt Constance Colby, urging him to come to California.
121	4	"The Man"	Don Medford	Story by : Diana Gould & Scott M. Hamner; Teleplay by : Dennis Turner	October 16, 1985	DY-119	20.6/31
Constance gives Jeff her half of the family business, Colby Enterprises. Krystle tries to make peace with Sammy Jo, while Sammy Jo moves forward with her plan to have Rita impersonate Krystle. The situation in Moldavia continues to put a strain on Amanda and Michael's marriage. Joel tells Rita that Sammy Jo can have her money, they are going after the Carrington fortune.
122	5	"The Gown"	Robert Scheerer	Story by : Diana Gould & Scott M. Hamner; Teleplay by : Dennis Turner	October 30, 1985	DY-120	22.0/33
Jeff tells Blake that he is moving to Los Angeles. Adam and Claudia get married. Krystle sees Rita for the first time at Delta Rho, with unexpected consequences. Dynasty was preempted by the fourth game of the 1985 World Series on October 23, 1985.
123	6	"The Titans: Part 1 & 2"	Irving J. Moore	Story by : Diana Gould & Scott M. Hamner; Teleplay by : Edward De Blasio	November 13, 1985	DY-121	24.2/37
124	7	"The Titans: Part 1 & 2"	Irving J. Moore	Story by : Diana Gould & Scott M. Hamner; Teleplay by : Edward De Blasio	November 13, 1985	DY-121	24.2/37
Blake prepares for the arrival of the Colbys. Alexis and Dex fly back to Moldavia to rescue King Galen. Meanwhile, Krystle is held hostage at Delta Rho by Joel, while Rita takes her place at the mansion. Dex is captured by the Moldavian army, however, dressed as a nun, Alexis safely crosses over the border. Adam tells Blake about his marriage to Claudia and an angry Blake counters by telling Adam that he is changing his will to leave Adam $1. The Colby family arrives in Denver from California. Steven is upset when he learns that Rita/Krystle has invited Sammy Jo to stay in the Carrington mansion. Jeff spots Fallon during the party at the mansion. Dynasty was preempted by part 3 of North and South on November 6, 1985. Note: "The Titans" parts 1 and 2 originally aired as a special two-hour episode. This episode set the stage for the spin-off The Colbys.
125	8	"The Decision"	Gwen Arner	Story by : Diana Gould & Scott M. Hamner; Teleplay by : Robert Seidenberg	November 20, 1985	DY-122	22.4/32
Dex and Alexis smuggle Galen out of Moldavia. Garrett Boydson, Jason Colby's attorney, hopes to rekindle a past romance with Dominique. Little Blake overhears a conversation between Rita and Sammy Jo and quickly realizes that she is not Krystle. Amanda tells Michael that she wants a divorce. Fallon and Miles make love as Jeff vows that once he finds Fallon, he will never let her go.
126	9	"The Proposal"	Robert Scheerer	Story by : Diana Gould & Scott M. Hamner; Teleplay by : Edward De Blasio	November 27, 1985	DY-123	20.6/34
After gaining financial independence due to an oil well willed to her by the late Walter Lankershim, Claudia decides to move back into the Carrington mansion. Michael orders Dex to stay away from Amanda. The family discovers that Fallon is not dead, but alive and living in California with Miles Colby. Rita begins drugging Blake to avoid having to make love with him. Alexis is intrigued when King Galen vows to make her "the most powerful woman in the world".
127	10	"The Close Call"	Irving J. Moore	Story by : Diana Gould & Scott M. Hamner; Teleplay by : Diana Gould	December 4, 1985	DY-124	21.8/32
Claudia and Blake have an argument when Blake lays claim to her oil well and she gets so angry that she agrees to Adam's plan to take control of everything Blake owns. With King Galen recuperating in Denver, he and Alexis begin to make plans to regain power. While Michael and Amanda attempt to fix the problems with their marriage, Dex and Alexis continue to fight about Galen. Joel tells Krystle that she has been replaced.
128	11	"The Quarrels"	Kim Friedman	Story by : Diana Gould & Scott M. Hamner; Teleplay by : Dennis Turner	December 11, 1985	DY-125	21.4/33
Rita is nervous when Blake schedules a doctor's appointment for "Krystle". Claudia considers suing Blake over possession of the oil well, but Adam convinces her that they can have more than just one well. Alexis witnesses "Krystle" get angry with L.B. Blake is left bewildered when Rita rejects him.
129	12	"The Roadhouse"	Jerome Courtland	Story by : Diana Gould & Scott M. Hamner; Teleplay by : Edward De Blasio	December 18, 1985	DY-126	20.0/30
Alexis moves Galen into her penthouse to recuperate. Alexis and Dex are shocked to see Krystle with Joel at the roadhouse and when Krystle sends signs of help to Alexis, Dex senses something is wrong, but Alexis tells him to forget about it. In a desperate move to win back her oil well, Claudia tries to get in Steven's good graces, in hopes that he can persuade Blake to return it to her. Krystle has a violent reaction when she sees Rita with Blake on TV.
130	13	"The Solution"	Irving J. Moore	Story by : Diana Gould & Scott M. Hamner; Teleplay by : Robert Seidenberg	December 25, 1985	DY-127	17.7/31
Galen lies to Alexis about the progress of his recovery. When L.B. tells Alexis that he saw Krystle kissing her doctor, Alexis tells Blake that Krystle is having an affair with Dr. Travers (a.k.a. Joel). Dominique is weak to Garrett Boydston's advances. Krystle realizes that Joel is becoming obsessed with her. Rita begins to poison Blake.
131	14	"Suspicions"	Nancy Malone	Story by : Diana Gould & Scott M. Hamner; Teleplay by : Diana Gould	January 8, 1986	DY-128	21.1/31
Blake suffers dizzy spells as Rita's slow poisoning takes effect. Anxious to secure the Carrington estate, Joel convinces Rita to administer the fatal dose. An enraged Steven engages Bart Fallmont in hand-to-hand combat over the pipeline construction. Dex is granted full building rights. Claudia decides to take the fight for her oil well into her own hands. Amanda is upset to learn that Elena is helping Michael. Alexis's sister, Caress Morell, is released from a Venezuelan prison in exchange for the "Alexis Carrington-Dexter Story". Sammy Jo discovers the empty vial of poison, and confronting an alarmed Rita, begins to suspect Joel's deadly plan. Dynasty was preempted by The Sugar Bowl game between Miami Vs. Tennessee on January 1, 1986.
132	15	"The Alarm"	Kim Friedman	Story by : Diana Gould & Scott M. Hamner; Teleplay by : Edward De Blasio	January 15, 1986	DY-129	20.4/30
Galen plots to regain his throne while Elena, learning the counter-revolution is in jeopardy, solicits Michael's help. Caress arrives in Denver and immediately begins conducting extensive research on Alexis. Joel intends to flee to South America with Krystle, rather than Rita. Adam takes advantage of Blake's condition and tricks him into signing a document granting Adam his power of attorney. Adam boasts to Claudia, but she is suspicious, and continues her attempt to prove rightful ownership of the oil well. Sammy Jo forces Rita to tell her about the plan to poison Blake and Sammy Jo warns Steven. As Rita watches, Blake, stricken with an apparent heart attack, falls down the stairs at the Carrington mansion.
133	16	"The Vigil"	Irving J. Moore	Story by : Diana Gould & Scott M. Hamner; Teleplay by : Dennis Turner	January 22, 1986	DY-130	24.2/35
After falling down the stairs, Blake is rushed to the hospital. Unconscious, Blake flashes back to the moment before his fall and realizes that "Krystle" is not Krystle. Galen continues his deceptive charade as he requests two million dollars from an unsuspecting Alexis and Dex is incensed. Rita panics when Blake demands to know who she really is; she flees to find Joel, but encounters Krystle instead and a vicious struggle ensues. Sammy Jo helps Krystle escape from Rita, but they are blocked by Joel.
134	17	"The Accident"	Kim Friedman	Story by : Diana Gould & Scott M. Hamner; Teleplay by : Edward De Blasio	January 29, 1986	DY-131	23.9/34
When Joel intercepts Krystle and Sammy Jo at Delta Rho, Krystle pretends to be Rita and escapes. Blake and Krystle are reunited, but Krystle is haunted by nightmares of Joel. While Krystle is furious with Sammy Jo, she decides not to press charges against her. Joel, believing Rita to be Krystle, reveals his plan to take Krystle to South America. As they are fleeing Denver, Rita fights with Joel and the car they are driving crashes; the police later inform Blake that no bodies were found in the wreckage. Alexis tries to prove that, while locked in the attic, Krystle had an affair with Joel and goes to a tabloid with the story. Dex attempts to force Galen to walk, but when he fails, it only drives Alexis further away from him. Dominique is surprised when her daughter, Jackie, arrives in Denver from Europe. Claudia tracks down Dr. Edwards in Montana.
135	18	"Souvenirs"	Robert Scheerer	Story by : Diana Gould & Scott M. Hamner; Teleplay by : Diana Gould	February 5, 1986	DY-132	20.2/30
At Alexis's command, a reporter disguised as a nanny, sneaks onto the Carrington Estate to interrogate Krystle. Krystle is overwhelmed with the realization that another woman was living her life. Blake reproaches Adam for his carelessness in permitting the malicious journalist onto the premises. Fallon returns home for consolation and support, hiding the fact that she was raped by Miles. Three marriages are in serious jeopardy as Claudia sends Adam a letter saying goodbye; Amanda informs Michael that she wants a divorce and; after catching a "crowned" Alexis admiring herself as Moldavian queen, Dex leaves her. Galen accidentally reveals his recovery to his son and insists that Michael save his marriage. Amanda later finds a drunken Dex and leads him back to his room where the two make passionate love. Alexis learns that Caress is free and enlists Zach Powers's help in preventing possible trouble.
136	19	"The Divorce"	Irving J. Moore	Story by : Diana Gould & Scott M. Hamner; Teleplay by : Susan Baskin	February 12, 1986	DY-133	22.5/33
Alexis catches Amanda and Dex in bed together and the next morning Alexis leaves for St. Thomas to get a divorce from Dex. Galen assures Dex that he has lost Alexis forever and now she will be his queen. Adam is dismayed to learn of Blake's plans to put Steven on the board of directors. While attending a party, Adam sees Bart Fallmont and Steven together and misinterprets it to mean something more. He immediately sets a conspiracy into motion to gather incriminating evidence against the senator. Garrett meets Jackie and after learning her age and the tragic story of having lost her father soon after her birth, Garrett suspects she might be his daughter. Back from St. Thomas, Alexis walks in on a phone conversation Galen is having and discovers he has been faking his paralysis. Enraged, she orders him out of her home and her life, but keeps the tiara and the crown jewels he had promised her.
137	20	"The Dismissal"	Irving J. Moore	Story by : Diana Gould & Scott M. Hamner; Teleplay by : Dennis Turner	February 19, 1986	DY-134	22.8/33
Blake becomes obsessed with apprehending Joel and Rita. Krystle and Sammy Jo begin to heal their relationship when Krystle sees how remorseful Sammy Jo is. Michael informs Amanda that Galen has been exiled to Lisbon, but is devastated when Amanda cuts short his wish to resume their marriage by telling him that she loves Dex. Alexis completely breaks relations with Dex, driving him back to Amanda. Adam schemes to win political support by publicizing Bart Fallmont's sexual preferences, despite Steven's protests. Caress makes a surprise visit to Alexis. Alexis has a dream that she and Blake are together again, but when Blake puts a quick end to making it a reality, she vows to destroy Blake's power hold in Denver-Carrington.
138	21	"Ben"	Kim Friedman	Story by : Diana Gould & Scott M. Hamner; Teleplay by : Edward De Blasio	February 26, 1986	DY-135	19.8/30
A crisis in Hong Kong sends Blake overseas, leaving Krystle to speak beside Alexis at the co-company dedication. When Alexis publicly denounces Blake's character, a vicious argument ensues and lands the two enraged women in the mud. Although Bart and Steven cannot agree about the pipeline particulars, they are in mutual accord with their affections. Bart secretly admits that he and his old roommate were lovers, not knowing that a private investigator, hired by Adam, is also privy to the information. Garrett questions a nervous Dominique about Jackie's father. His suspicions grow when Dominique refuses to answer. Still wracked with guilt over the debacle with Joel and Rita, a despondent Sammy Jo makes plans to leave Denver but she changes her mind after a compassionate plea from Blake. Alexis learns of Ben Carrington's isolated existence in Australia. With vengeance as her inspiration, she lures the recluse back to Denver, hoping to pit the estranged brothers against one another. Upon her return, Alexis receives a housewarming gift that turns her blood cold; Caress has moved in.
139	22	"Masquerade"	Jerome Courtland	Story by : Diana Gould & Scott M. Hamner; Teleplay by : Robert Seidenberg	March 5, 1986	DY-136	22.0/33
Speaking at her own prearranged press conference, Alexis brashly announces a masquerade party fund-raiser at the Carrington mansion. Upon returning from Hong Kong, Blake reluctantly agrees to host the event in hopes of persuading ex-senator Buck Fallmont to reevaluate his stand on the pipeline. Intercepting a call meant for Caress, Alexis learns of her sister's spiteful plan to write a book on her tumultuous life. Garrett confronts Dominique with the fact that Jackie's father is listed as ""unknown"" on her birth certificate. Dominique denies Garrett's assertions that Jackie may be his daughter. At the masquerade ball, Bart Fallmont shows Steven the newspaper headline running in the next morning's edition, which claims that Bart had a homosexual lover. Steven immediately suspects Adam's treachery and a fight ensues. Alexis then sets her plan for Blake's demise into motion when Ben removes his costume and reveals himself as Blake's brother.
140	23	"The Subpoenas"	Irving J. Moore	Story by : Diana Gould & Scott M. Hamner; Teleplay by : Edward De Blasio	March 12, 1986	DY-137	22.6/34
Alexis's surprise unveiling of Ben stuns Blake, but she has little time to relish her first victory when Ben threatens to be her fiercest adversary if their plans go awry. Amanda is crushed when Dex confesses that he does not love her. Furious at Adam for publicizing Bart's past illicit romance, Steven instigates another battle with his brother. Blake also reprimands Adam, but the story accomplishes its purpose as ex-senator Buck Fallmont withdraws the pipeline injunction. Claudia returns and moves out of the Carrington mansion. Her suspicions concerning her paternity growing, Jackie makes a call to Paris to request a copy of her birth certificate. Despite Krystle's queries, Blake refuses to discuss his estrangement from his brother. Blake is confronted by Ben, who has returned to Denver to contest their father's will. Having discovered Caress's sinister intentions, Alexis secretly buys the company contracted to publish the damaging expose. Unaware of her sister's actions, Caress continues to write and to fall prey to a merciless Alexis.
141	24	"The Trial: Part 1"	Michel Hugo	Story by : Diana Gould & Scott M. Hamner; Teleplay by : Dennis Turner	March 19, 1986	DY-138	21.3/33
After purchasing the company contracted to publish Caress's book, ""Sister Dearest,"" Alexis savors crushing her sister's grandiose dreams of literary fame and fortune. Jackie learns that her birth certificate lists her father as ""unknown."" Dominique, called to testify at Blake's trial, has no time to explain and Jackie leaves in tears. Vying for the inheritance he was denied, Ben accuses Blake of maliciously turning their father against him. Blake's rise to power is exposed by the incriminating testimony of those closest to him. Despite Ben's inflammatory accusations, Blake's case remains strong until Alexis takes the stand against him.
142	25	"The Trial: Part 2"	Don Medford	Story by : Diana Gould & Scott M. Hamner; Teleplay by : Dennis Turner	March 26, 1986	DY-139	20.2/31
Blake's hopes are renewed when a key witness, Franklin, admits that Alexis paid him to alter his testimony. But Franklin later arrives in court intoxicated and is unable to answer any questions. Angered by the drunken witness, the judge rules in favor of Ben, and Blake is forced to surrender one-fourth of the family estate. Blake vows to appeal and is determined to track down the mysterious woman who can clear his name. Bart is dropped from the senatorial race when newspaper headlines announce his homosexuality. Dex offers Clay Fallmont a job on the pipeline. As Blake and Dex review construction particulars, a rancorous ex-employee orchestrates a potentially fatal accident. Buck Fallmont's wife, Emily, is ready to confess that she and Ben met the night of Ellen Carrington's tragic death. Fearing discovery, Ben warns Emily of the scandal that would result if she did. In the meantime, Blake makes plans to destroy Alexis by staging a corporate takeover of Colbyco.
143	26	"The Vote"	Irving J. Moore	Story by : Diana Gould & Scott M. Hamner; Teleplay by : Edward De Blasio	April 2, 1986	DY-140	21.1/33
The accusations leveled against Blake at the trial cause the value of Denver-Carrington stock to plunge. At an emergency board meeting, Blake is nearly deposed as chairman when Martin Gaines, a board member, rallies opinion against him. Blake formally announces his takeover plan for Colbyco and wins back support, with Steven casting the deciding vote. Dex discovers Alexis and Ben ""intimately"" involved in planning Blake's destruction. Caress offers Blake her help. While searching Adam's office, Claudia discovers the document giving Adam Blake's Power of Attorney and uses it to blackmail Adam. When Jackie runs away, a distraught Dominique turns to Garrett and acknowledges that he is Jackie's father. Amanda sinks into a dangerous depression when she is unable to find a job and is continually rejected by a cold Alexis.
144	27	"The Warning"	Don Medford	Story by : Diana Gould & Scott M. Hamner; Teleplay by : Diana Gould	April 9, 1986	DY-141	21.0/33
Determined to help Blake, Caress attempts to discover the identity of the mystery woman Ben was with the night of his mother's death and, eventually, learns that it was Emily Fallmont. In a desperate attempt to raise the money for the leveraged buy-out of Colby Co, Blake temporarily relinquishes control of Krystle Holdings to Bob Ashmore in exchange for a 100 million dollar loan. The demise of Blake's empire continues when Bob Ashmore places a congratulatory call to Ben, celebrating their successful coup over the unsuspecting Blake. As Ben's plot to ruin his brother unfolds, Alexis prepares to present the Chinese government with falsified records showing Blake to be cheating them of royalties from the China Sea leases. Claudia threatens to reveal Adam's power of attorney over Denver-Carrington unless the title to the oil well stolen from her is returned.
145	28	"The Cry"	Irving J. Moore	Story by : Diana Gould & Scott M. Hamner; Teleplay by : Scott M. Hamner	April 16, 1986	DY-142	19.2/30
Desperate for a loan, Blake accepts an unexpected offer from Middle Eastern financial magnate Farouk Ahmed that has a staggering fee, not knowing that Alexis is his actual creditor. Caress informs Blake that Emily was the woman with Ben the night of the fire and leaves with him her expose, ""Sister Dearest"" as additional ammunition against Alexis. Blake confronts Emily, who breaks down and confesses her guilt. Seeing her torment, Blake promises to fight Ben without benefit of Emily's testimony. Struggling on her own, Jackie reconsiders her rash action of running away. Returning home, Jackie is shocked to learn that Garrett is her real father. Adam succumbs to Claudia's blackmail and transfers ownership of the disputed oil well over to her. Feeling ignored and having received yet another berating at the hands of Alexis, Amanda becomes more and more despondent and attempts suicide.
146	29	"The Rescue"	Nancy Malone	Story by : Diana Gould & Scott M. Hamner; Teleplay by : Dennis Turner	April 30, 1986	DY-143	19.5/31
Alexis finds an unconscious Amanda at La Mirage and rushes her to the hospital. Dominique proposes to Garrett and the two make plans to marry. Steven fears losing custody of Danny if Sammy Jo marries Clay Fallmont. Caress demands ten percent of Ben's inheritance in exchange for her silence regarding Emily Fallmont; Ben agrees, but secretly arranges to have Caress extradited to Caracas to finish serving her prison sentence. Alexis prepares to call in her one billion dollar loan to Blake to gain control of his South China Sea leases. Calling her contact, Kai Liu, Alexis schedules a meeting with the Chinese Oil Ministry. But she is yet unaware of Ben's own scheme with Liu. Dynasty was preempted by the ABC Wednesday Night Movie Alex: The Life of a Child on April 23, 1986.
147	30	"The Triple-Cross"	Don Medford	Story by : Diana Gould & Scott M. Hamner; Teleplay by : Diana Gould	May 14, 1986	DY-144	20.5/32
Secure that his South China Sea leases will cover him, Blake purchases increasing amounts of Colbyco stock. Taking advantage of his precarious situation, Alexis falsifies Blake's oil production figures. Blake is faced with financial ruin when Chinese Oil Minister Han accuses him of cheating and intimates that the leases may no longer be extended to him. Dex reveals Ben's suspicious past to Alexis. Disregarding the warning, Alexis, along with Blake, falls prey to Ben's treachery. Using the court scandal and ""Sister Dearest"" to blacken the reputations of the Denver-Carrington and Colbyco powers, Ben gains sole control of the South China Sea leases. Steven attempts to investigate Adam's guarded files, but the records are destroyed before he can uncover the secret he knows his brother is hiding. Dominique makes wedding plans. Passionate feelings grow when Sammy Jo and Clay spend a candlelit evening together. Dynasty was preempted by Part 4 of North and South Book II: Love and War on May 7, 1986.
148	31	"The Vendetta"	Irving J. Moore	Story by : Diana Gould & Scott M. Hamner; Teleplay by : Edward De Blasio	May 21, 1986	DY-145	21.9/34
Blake is shocked when newspaper headlines announce Ben's acquisition of the South China Sea leases. An irate Claudia confronts Blake and accuses him of siphoning oil from the Lankershim One oil well causing it to go dry and then reveals to Blake that Adam tricked him into signing the Power Of Attorney document. Sure of Ben and Alexis's collusion, Blake greets the co-conspirators with copies of "Sister Dearest", which he vengefully hands out to the hungry press. Farouk Ahmed calls off Blake's $1 billion loan, but demands his $250 million fee; he informs Blake that Alexis was behind the loan and when Blake confronts Alexis, she demands the $250 million in Denver-Carrington stock. At Dominique's engagement party, Sammy Jo and Amanda fight over Clay and end up falling into the pool, Amanda holds a helpless Sammy Jo under water. Dominique's happiness is shattered when she learns that Garrett was never married before.In her room at La Mirage, Claudia, becoming increasingly more unstable, accidentally sets the room on fire, while the engagement party continues below. Blake and Krystle arrive at the Carrington mansion and are greeted by a gloating Alexis, who tells Blake that she has bought all of his holdings, including the Carrington mansion; a vengeful Blake lunges for Alexis's throat.

== Reception ==
In season six, Dynasty was still in the Top 10. However, it dropped to #7 in the United States with a 21.8 Nielsen rating.
