= Wind at My Back =

- DVD cover
- Genre: Historical drama
- Created by: Kevin Sullivan
- Based on: Never Sleep Three in a Bed; The Night We Stole the Mounties Car by Max Braithwaite Ten Lost Years by Barry Broadfoot
- Starring: Shirley Douglas; Cynthia Belliveau; Kathryn Greenwood; Dylan Provencher; Tyrone Savage; James Carroll; Ron Lea; Gordon Pinsent; Robin Craig; Dalene Irvine; Laura Bruneau
- Country of origin: Canada
- Original language: English
- No. of seasons: 5
- No. of episodes: 65 (+ TV movie)

Production
- Running time: 45 minutes
- Production company: Sullivan Films

Original release
- Network: CBC
- Release: December 1, 1996 – April 1, 2001

Wind at My Back is a television series that aired in Canada on CBC Television between 1996 and 2001. It was created and produced by Kevin Sullivan, best known for his adaptation of Anne of Green Gables and Road to Avonlea. The series had five seasons, each with thirteen episodes, and a Christmas themed movie produced to wrap up loose ends, following the unexpected cancellation of the series.

The series is set during the Great Depression of the 1930s, in the fictional small mining town of New Bedford in Northern Ontario. The family drama followed the members of the Bailey family as they lived through a time marked by hardship. Wind at My Back was loosely based on the Max Braithwaite books Never Sleep Three in a Bed and The Night We Stole the Mountie's Car.

== Plot ==
The series opens in 1932, as Jack and Honey Bailey lose their hardware store and are forced to move back to Jack's hometown of New Bedford, Ontario, where his family owns a silver mine. When Jack dies after being stung by hornets, Honey is forced to leave her children, Hubert, Henry and Violet, with her domineering mother-in-law while she searches for work. The series follows Honey, her children, their extended family, and friends as they attempt to survive and thrive during the 1930s.

== Episodes ==
=== Series overview ===
Season	Episodes	Originally released	
Season	Episodes	First released	Last released
1	13	December 1, 1996	February 23, 1997
2	13	September 28, 1997	December 21, 1997
3	13	January 24, 1999	April 18, 1999
4	13	January 16, 2000	October 29, 2000
5	13	November 5, 2000	April 1, 2001

=== Season 1 (1996–97) ===
No. overall	No. in season	Title	Directed by	Written by	Original air date
1 2	1 2	"Four Walls and a Roof"	Harvey Frost	Marlene Matthews Raymond Storey	December 1, 1996
3	3	"No Way of Telling"	Harvey Frost	Jeremy Hole	December 8, 1996
4	4	"A Family of Independent Means"	Ken Jubenvill	Avrum Jacobson, Janet MacLean	December 15, 1996
5	5	"My Dog Pal"	Ken Jubenvill	Laurie Pearson	December 22, 1996
6	6	"Something From Nothing"	Ken Jubenvill	Blair Ferguson	January 5, 1997
7	7	"Moonshine Struck"	Stacey Stewart Curtis	Raymond Storey	January 12, 1997
8	8	"Train to Nowhere"	Stacey Stewart Curtis	Raymond Storey	January 19, 1997
9	9	"Aunt Grace's Wedding"	Ken Jubenvill	Laurie Pearson	January 26, 1997
10	10	"No Place Like Home"	Stefan Scaini	Marlene Matthews	February 2, 1997
11	11	"Chasing Rainbows"	Ken Jubenvill	Laurie Pearson	February 9, 1997
12	12	"Moving Mountains"	Ken Jubenvill	Michael Amo	February 16, 1997
13	13	"Back in My Arms Again"	Stefan Scaini	Marlene Matthews	February 23, 1997

=== Season 2 (1997) ===
No. overall	No. in season	Title	Directed by	Written by	Original air date
14	1	"Many Happy Returns"	Ken Jubenvill	Laurie Pearson	September 28, 1997
15	2	"Never Sleep Three in a Bed"	Penelope Buitenhuis	Arnold Margolin	October 5, 1997
16	3	"The Agony Column"	Vic Sarin	Laurie Pearson	October 12, 1997
17	4	"Triple Trouble"	Donald Shebib	J. H. Wyman	October 19, 1997
18	5	"Summer Dreams, Summer Nightmares"	Roman Buchok	Michael Mercer	October 26, 1997
19	6	"The Champ"	Stefan Scaini	Roy Sallows	November 2, 1997
20	7	"By Gosh or By Golly"	Roman Buchok	Dennis Foon, Roy Sallows	November 9, 1997
21	8	"Careers"	Stefan Scaini	Arnold Margolin	November 23, 1997
22	9	"Radio Waves"	Stefan Scaini	Michael Mercer	November 30, 1997
23	10	"A Ghost of a Chance"	Stefan Scaini	Roy Sallows, Raymond Storey	December 7, 1997
24	11	"A Meeting of the Clan"	Ken Jubenvill	Laurie Pearson, Arnold Margolin	December 14, 1997
25	12	"Of All That Human Hearts Endure"	Ken Jubenvill	Barry Stevens	December 21, 1997
26	13	"Smiling Through"	Ken Jubenvill	Laurie Pearson	December 21, 1997

=== Season 3 (1999) ===
No. overall	No. in season	Title	Directed by	Written by	Original air date
27	1	"The Resurrection of May"	Stefan Scaini	Raymond Storey	January 24, 1999
28	2	"The Long Weekend"	Stefan Scaini	Raymond Storey	January 31, 1999
29	3	"The Forever Leap"	Ken Jubenvill	Kelly Rebar	April 11, 1999
30	4	"My Beautiful Mom"	Stefan Scaini	Dave Carley	February 7, 1999
31	5	"The Fever"	Ken Jubenvill	Raymond Storey	March 14, 1999
32	6	"The Crystal Skull"	Ken Jubenvill	Arnold Margolin	February 21, 1999
33	7	"Public Enemies"	Stefan Scaini	Laurie Pearson	March 7, 1999
34	8	"New Directions"	Donald Shebib	Michael Mercer	March 21, 1999
35	9	"The Strap"	Stefan Scaini	Arnold Margolin	March 28, 1999
36	10	"Grace of Hollywood"	Donald Shebib	Laurie Pearson	March 28, 1999
37	11	"Marathon"	Don McBrearty	Raymond Storey	April 4, 1999
38	12	"A Mission for Honey"	Stacey Stewart Curtis	Barry Stevens	April 18, 1999
39	13	"Life on Mars"	Stefan Scaini	Raymond Storey	April 18, 1999

=== Season 4 (2000) ===
No. overall	No. in season	Title	Directed by	Written by	Original air date
40	1	"All This and Heaven Too"	Ken Jubenvill	Raymond Storey	January 16, 2000
41	2	"It Doesn't Mean a Thing"	Michael Kennedy	Raymond Storey	January 30, 2000
42	3	"A Girl in Trouble"	Ken Jubenvill	Kelly Rebar	February 6, 2000
43	4	"A River Rages"	Roman Buchok	James DeFelice	February 13, 2000
44	5	"After Leo"	Ken Jubenvill	Michael MacLennan	February 27, 2000
45	6	"Faith Healer"	Alan Goluboff	Ann MacNaughton	March 5, 2000
46	7	"Remembrance Day"	Don McBrearty	Jeremy Hole	March 12, 2000
47	8	"The Shadow Boxer"	Ken Jubenvill	Michael MacLennan	March 19, 2000
48	9	"Murmur Most Foul"	Roman Buchok	Maureen McKeon	March 26, 2000
49	10	"The Wild Blue Yonder"	Don McBrearty	Michael MacLennan, Raymond Storey	April 2, 2000
50	11	"A Family Again"	Stefan Scaini	Michael MacLennan, Raymond Storey	October 15, 2000
51	12	"A Formal Affair"	Michael Kennedy	Ann MacNaughton	October 22, 2000
52	13	"The Foolish Heart"	Stefan Scaini	Raymond Storey	October 29, 2000

=== Season 5 (2000–01) ===
No. overall	No. in season	Title	Directed by	Written by	Original air date
53	1	"Coming of Age"	Stefan Scaini	John Boni	November 5, 2000
54	2	"Oh Happy Day"	Ken Jubenvill	Ann MacNaughton	November 12, 2000
55	3	"The Trick Cyclist"	Otta Hanus	Michael MacLennan	December 3, 2000
56	4	"New Girls in Town"	Stefan Scaini	John Boni	December 10, 2000
57	5	"The Spanish Prisoner"	Ken Jubenvill	John Boni	January 7, 2001
58	6	"Marriage of True Minds"	Don McBrearty	Ann MacNaughton	January 14, 2001
59	7	"For God and Country"	Ken Jubenvill	John Boni	January 21, 2001
60	8	"Enter Eddie Jackson"	Ken Jubenvill	Michael MacLennan	January 28, 2001
61	9	"The Summer Plague"	Don McBrearty	Ann MacNaughton	February 4, 2001
62	10	"Reconciliation"	Stefan Scaini	Michael MacLennan	February 11, 2001
63	11	"Crack in the Mirror"	Otta Hanus	John Boni	February 18, 2001
64	12	"Secrets and Lies"	Stefan Scaini	John Boni	April 1, 2001
65	13	"Pay Back"	Stefan Scaini	John Boni	April 1, 2001

=== TV Movie ===
Title	Directed by	Written by	Original release date
"A Wind at My Back Christmas"	Stefan Scaini	Rebecca Schechter	December 23, 2001

== Characters ==
=== Honey Bailey ===
When the show begins, Roman Catholic Honey (Cynthia Belliveau in seasons 1–3, and Laura Bruneau, seasons 4 & 5) is married to Presbyterian Jack Bailey. They own a small town hardware store, but it is forced into bankruptcy when the bank calls their loan. They return to Jack's mother's home, revealing Jack is from a privileged upbringing. Jack finds the visit intolerable with his overbearing mother, May, and retreats with his family to their summer cabin by the lake. Upon cleaning the house out, Jack encounters a nest of hornets that quickly overtake him. Honey and the children try to get him back to town, but he succumbs to the stings and dies soon after. While at May's house, Honey desperately tries to find work to no avail. May also forces Honey to give up her baby daughter, Violet, to the care of distant relatives, telling her that the judge would find her unfit should she try to fight it. Honey never fully understood the arrangement May had offered the relatives regarding Violet, that she was up for a full adoption. Not finding work in New Bedford, Honey decides she must leave the boys with May while she looks for work elsewhere. She lives with her brother in North Bridge for a while. She got a job, but her brother sold the building the apartment was in, stole her money, and left town without telling her. She then worked in a garment factory in Toronto, but lost it following a near-death illness. To recuperate, she reluctantly went back to living at May's, and is briefly romantically pursued by a cocky local constable from England. She is given an office job at the silver mine, May's mine, and soon creates a following in the town as a hairdresser. She makes friends in the small town, one of whom lives in the house, Grace, May's adult daughter. Grace is also a savior to the boys on many occasions. Honey and the boys suffered months of May's manipulations, including the near-kidnap of her daughter, Violet, to Florida. Honey takes her children to live in the back room of the local laundry. She loses her job at the mine, but gains a very part-time one at the laundry. She also loses all of her hairdressing clients. Max Sutton, a man of whom she had grown quite fond, asks her to marry him, to which she agrees. He then tentatively accepts a teaching job in Albany, NY. May is beyond distressed that Honey would take her grandsons away. She tries first to manipulate the New Bedford school board into letting Max keep his job, but after they had fired him for her earlier, they refused. She then goes to her son Robert to try to convince him to give Honey her job back at the mine. This also does not work. May's last resort is to try to make a gift of the house Honey had been saving to buy, but May had purchased it out from under her so she could not have it and Honey declined the gift. At the last minute, Max receives a job offer that could keep them in New Bedford, something Honey's second son, Henry, or Fat, really wants to do. His youth and naivete allowed him to often see the good of his grandmother May's heart and he openly explained he did not want to leave because he knew it would hurt her if they did.

Honey and Max Sutton marry. They live in the local hotel in a suite of small but comfortable rooms. Hub's bad behaviour seem to be level out and things quiet for the family. Shortly after their marriage, Honey discovers she is pregnant, giving birth to Zach. Her joy quickly evaporates, though, when she is diagnosed with tuberculosis. She leaves for a sanatorium to recover and Max is forced to raise the four children. When she returns one year later, Honey finds that the children have grown and changed and that everyone in town is scared of her due to her illness. Slowly, she recovers her hair salon and tries to begin her life again. Soon, her life is back to normal.

=== May Bailey ===
May (Shirley Douglas) is Honey's domineering mother-in-law. She and her late husband are the founders of the town. They ran a mining operation that continued to keep the family going. May's money and prestige allow her to have whatever she wants. She uses her pride, her sense of family, and her religion to justify most of her highly manipulative actions. She is often right, but all of the conclusions could have been reached in far less intrusive ways. She never lets people reach their own conclusions. Due to her deeply held Protestant ways, she is completely intolerant and unaccepting of Honey's Catholicism and any effects on the boys, something about which she is not quiet. Through conversations with Grace, her daughter, she is also revealed to still resent Honey for having taken her late son away from the family mining business. This does seem unknown to Honey.

Very soon after Jack's death, she forces Honey to give up her small daughter, Violet, and keeps her from getting a job in the town, knowing this would force Honey to leave to look for work elsewhere. May views the boys as a second chance, an opportunity to fix the mistakes she made with her own sons. While her decisions are often harsh and manipulative, May honestly believes that her decisions are what is best for the family. May can be a confusing mix of qualities. She is frequently self-serving and manipulative, but she can show moments of true gentleness, kindness, and understanding. These moments are few, but they do allow some insight into who she really is. She also allows snippets of explanation out when she talks to the boys. In one of her responses to a request from the boys, she reveals what has happened in her life to bring her to where she is now. They are flabbergasted their grandmother has survived so much and seem to show a bit of new-found respect, more so with Henry, the younger son. Hub tends to remain defiant and cynical. May is also a Director of the local homeless shelter for local people, at which the other family members often help, but she resists her son-in-law Max Sutton's attempts to open it to out-of-town hobos.

It becomes apparent that she has a serious heart condition and suffers a number of severe heart attacks. She attempted to hide her condition from the family, but it is discovered after the attacks become more severe. May is frustrated by her family's attempts to care for her and insists they are only interested in taking over the mine. She resists the advice of the doctor, her private nurse. and family whenever possible so she can attempt to control the mine. Eventually, she fires the nurse and regains her position as head of the mine. Her relationship remains rocky with Honey until Honey gives birth to Zach, in the mining office. May delivers the baby and decides to put her differences with Honey aside. Later, May suffers a stroke that leaves her partially paralyzed on one side. With the support of her family and a new nurse, she slowly recovers. She still maintains her position as head of the mine. May recovers from her stroke very well, traveling to Europe within about 18 months of the stroke. She and Grace are recovering the body of Grace's deceased husband, who was killed fighting in Spain. This is mentioned in the Christmas special.

=== Grace Bailey ===
Grace (Kathy Greenwood) is Honey's unmarried adult sister-in-law who lives under the same roof with her domineering mother. Grace is a gentle, loving, happy, and playful soul who can appear naive or at least inexperienced at times, and loves magazines about movie stars. Grace has never left home because her mother destroys her self-confidence at every turn and frequently states Grace "could never make it for five minutes on her own". While Grace mostly obeys her mother, when she strongly believes in something, she will stand up for herself or the issue. But to experience many of the normal things in life and without experiencing the wrath of her disapproving mother, she has found that doing things without May knowing is the path of least resistance. When the boys move into their grandmother's home, Grace teaches them secrets of how to survive in the household. In return, one of the skills she learned from the boys and Honey was how to dismiss May and to simply state how things are to her face without feeling completely crushed by her. Grace was once so delicate, May barely had to say anything at all and she would have an anxiety attack. She gained more confidence, though, in speaking the truth to May. Both Grace and Honey never use harsh language with May, unlike Hub, who really could not care less if May knows the truth of his feelings. These outbursts leave room for Grace to explain to her mother where she has gone wrong and that if she keeps it up she "won't be there to hold her hand."

After seeing Honey's little family fight May so hard to stay together, Grace finds her courage and decides it is time for her to move out. She begins a job as a telephone operator and then a job as the local radio station supervisor. She later moves away from home and shares a house with her former sister-in-law, Toppy. Grace is involved with a series of men, but nothing ever works out between them. Once, a "true love" was mentioned, but for reasons unknown, it never worked out. Grace eventually becomes involved with a man named Van and after a short whirlwind affair, she marries him. She quickly finds out that he is actually a con man and has lied to her about everything, except how he feels about her, something she no longer cares about. He tries to win her back and for a very short time it looks as if he has succeeded, but in due course, Van discovers she is trying to run a game on him. He does not reveal that he is onto her, letting it all play out as she wanted. This con was something that Toppy tried repeatedly to talk Grace from doing. Grace's ire was so hot it was nearly beyond her. She wanted him to feel something of what she had at his hand. In the wake of her disgust, Van joins the army and goes to fight in Spain. In the moments before he leaves, his real name is revealed as James. During the fighting, he is killed. Grace is sent and then accepts a request from her dead husband to retrieve his body from Europe and to bury him in San Francisco, where he is from. Her trip occurs during the Christmas special, so neither she nor May is seen.

Over the course of the series, Grace Bailey had a number of beaus. In Season 1, Grace went out with Judd Wainwright, an old classmate who she runs into on the bus to North Bridge. Encouraged by Honey, Grace sneaks out to attend a friend's out-of-town wedding with Judd ("Aunt Grace's Wedding"). Judd proposes, but breaks off the engagement near the end of Season 1 to take a sales job out west. In Season 2, Grace was romantically linked with Ollie Jefferson, owner of an automotive garage, who wanted to marry Grace, but Grace often did not feel the same. Grace found herself more drawn to Del Sutton, Max's older brother, who came to town for Honey and Max's wedding, but decided to stay in town and eventually got a job as mechanic at Ollie's garage. Their fling lasted from the end of season two to the middle of season three, when Del loses his job and decides to leave town ("New Directions"). After Del leaves, Grace meets Jim Flett, the new schoolteacher who was widowed with a son. Their friendship grows and at the end of Season 4, they share a kiss. In Season 5, Jim decides he is not yet ready to move on from the loss of his wife, and Grace falls for Vanaver 'Van' Mainwairing, a mysterious stranger who arrives in town. They are married in a matter of days, but their marriage comes to a bitter end when Grace discovers that Van used her in a con and will not forgive him. He, heartbroken over his mistake, and leaves to fight in the Spanish Civil War. In the Christmas movie, it is revealed that Van died in the war.

=== Hubert "Hub" Bailey ===
Hubert (Dylan Provencher) is Honey's eldest son. In the first season, Hub is 12 years old. He is somewhat mischievous and tough. He is incredibly stubborn and frequently resists his grandmother's control over him. Soon after his arrival in New Bedford, Hub begins to get into trouble and fail in school. His problems are caused by his loss of his father, his far-away mother and younger sister, and his frustrations with his grandmother. His misadventures include pranking a moonshiner at Halloween, sneaking out repeatedly with a gang to steal furniture, jumping off a train trestle, and visiting a billiard hall. The local constable is often involved. Once his family is reunited and his life settles down, his problems fade. At one point, he lives and works on a farm during haying season.

In the second season, he becomes interested in the mine. May encourages this interest and begins to prime him to become the future head of the mine. When he is older, he works a day in the mine and discovers the injustices in the miners' lives. May and he work together to create a plan to improve the miners' lives. As Hub moves into his later teens, he loses his tough side and becomes a quieter, gentler boy. He is frequently concerned with injustice and doing good. At one point, he even offers to marry a pregnant friend, Alice, so that she and her baby will not be alone. The baby is eventually adopted by Ollie and Marjorie Jefferson, the local garage owners. After much contemplation, Hub decides that his career is not going to be running the mine. He wants to become a priest, which he feels will let him do good. May is outraged by the decision and disinherits him. They eventually settle their difference, but it is not clear if Hub is reinherited. During the Christmas special, Hub is attending seminary, but his attention is drawn away from his studies by a young Jewish girl, who escaped from Austria. His relationship with her eventually influences his decision to drop out of seminary and find another way to do good in the world.

=== Henry "Fat" Bailey ===
Henry (Tyrone Savage) is Honey's second son. He is about 10 when the series begins. He is kind hearted but very mischievous. To Hub's annoyance, Fat frequently tags along on his adventures. While Hub frequently resents his grandmother, Fat appears to like her. He often helps her and spends time with her. He frequently manages to be affectionate with her, something that none of the other family manages to achieve.

In the second season, Fat makes friends with a tomboy named Maisey McGinty who works at her grandfather's pawn shop. While she frequently bosses him around, Fat enjoys her company as an alternative to Hub. When Hub gets older and spends less time with him, Fat relies more and more on Maisey for friendship. As Fat gets older, he finds himself getting into trouble frequently, such as breaking into the radio station at night with Maisey, and trying to steal the car of a pawn shop client. He feels he is old enough not to be treated like a child and rebels against the authority around him. The local people, Hub, and even his parents do not take him very seriously, which leads to his frustration. Fat shows no interest in the mine over the years and May does not bother to try to interest him. Fat's main interest is in the police and the RCMP. Most of his interest in law enforcement is caused by movies and fictional stories until he meets a police officer, during the Christmas special. This interaction leads him to announce to the family that he intends to become a police officer. His family does not seriously listen to him but Fat appears to be set on this goal.

=== Max Sutton ===
Max (James Carroll) is a local social studies teacher and coach in town who takes a liking to Honey. Max actually meets the boys first, when they have run away from home to the family's cabin. After they get hurt in a kitchen accident, he helps them. He encourages them to join the school's sports teams, which Hub eventually does. He also drives them to secretly visit Violet in another town. In the second season, Max and Honey are married. When Max marries Honey, Hub resents his addition to the family. Hub feels he is a weak replacement for their father and resists Max's attempts to control him or Fat. They eventually accept each other and Hub later sees Max as a support. May also has issues with Max, believing him to be a Communist and too laid back to be a school teacher. Eventually, they come to an understanding, after Max discovers a vein of nickel ore on May's rural property just before she was to sell it. When Honey gives birth to Max's child, Zach, he is delighted. Max is a freelance writer, who sometimes writes crime stories or pieces for the local radio station, in addition to being school vice-principal. In the Christmas special, Honey and he work together to try to find a way for him to complete his novel and allow Honey to go to college. Max is eventually elected town Mayor, defeating hotel owner Mr. Cramp.

=== Robert "Bob" and Toppy Bailey ===
Bob (Dan Lett) is May's oldest son. He runs the mine, but is frequently frustrated by her attempts to control things. Toppy (Robin Craig) is Bob's wife and May's daughter-in-law. Toppy is her nickname, but her real name is never revealed. Toppy was the name of her doll when she was a child, a doll she dearly loved. The couple has a daughter named Doris. When the show begins, Bob, Toppy, and Doris are snobbish and cold to Honey and her children. Doris picks a fight with Hub on his first day in New Bedford, which leads to him punching her. This sets Bob and Doris's opinion of Hub in stone.

In the second season, Bob tries to save the mine from bankruptcy, but his long work hours put on strain on his marriage and make him irritable. He is also blamed for a mining accident caused by purchasing cheap, faulty dynamite. Eventually, Toppy leaves him, taking Doris with her to Toronto. When Toppy offers a chance at reconciliation, Bob abandons the mine and flees town. The couple hopes that getting away from the mine and May will allow them a second chance. Their attempts to save their marriage fail and they eventually divorce. Doris is sent to boarding school while the couple deals with the legal side of things. Toppy returns to New Bedford and attempts to start a life without Bob there. She fails at opening a dance school and selling lingerie. She is occasionally given the cold shoulder by locals because she is divorced. Toppy recurs in the first three seasons and becomes a regular cast member in seasons 4– & 5, when she is pursued by Archie, a bachelor drugstore owner, who acts with her in a play. Bob is only seen on a few occasions after he leaves town. May is furious with him leaving and frequently blames him for the problems with the mine.

=== Violet Bailey ===
Violet (Victoria Collyer in the first few seasons and Natasha LaForce in later seasons) is Honey's third child and only daughter. She is about 18 months old when the series begins. Honey is forced to give Violet to distant relatives, after her husband's death. The relatives are infertile and desperate for a child. May secretly tells them that Honey will never be able to get Violet back and they should raise Violet as if she were their own. They do this until Honey tries to get Violet back. When they believe they might lose Violet, they attempt to flee to the United States. Hub and Fat kidnap Violet back and return her to Honey. After this event, Honey leaves May's home, with all three children, vowing never to come back.

Violet grows slowly through the seasons after this. When she gets older, she seems to consider Max her father. She frequently plays with Fat, though she is eight years younger.

== Season synopses ==
=== Season 1 ===
The first season is set in 1932–1933. In the town of North Bridge, the bank shuts down Jack and Honey Bailey's hardware store. Unable to find work, Jack realizes his only choice is to return to his hometown of New Bedford, where his domineering mother May Bailey runs the Silver Dome mine. After Jack dies of a severe allergic reaction to hornet stings, his mother May Bailey, who never approved of Jack's choice of a wife, forces Honey to leave her two sons, Hub and Fat, in New Bedford, and sends away her daughter, Violet, to relatives. While May's actions are manipulative and harsh, she truly believes she is doing what is best for her grandchildren. Hub (Hubert) and Fat (Henry) resent their grandmother for separating them from their family and scheme to return to their mother. After a series of devastating setbacks, Honey moves in with May and is reunited with her sons. Together, they dream of a future where they are reunited with Violet and are able to move away from May.

=== Season 2 ===
Season 2 is set in 1933–1934. Honey marries school teacher Max Sutton (who had clashed with May Bailey over inviting out-of-town hobos to the local shelter which she directs), they move into the New Bedford hotel, and she opens a beauty parlor on Main Street, after May expelled her business from the house. Hub stays temporarily on a farm during haying season. Grace works at the town's radio station, managed by the hotel keeper's catty wife, leading to several humorous situations. The Silver Dome Mine experiences financial problems, and a mining accident - blamed on Robert Bailey - which kills and blinds some workers. May's old boyfriend returns to town and opens a pawnshop with his tomboy granddaughter, who becomes Fat's companion in various minor mischief. The season ends as the mine is shut down, and Grace and Del Sutton (Max's immature bum of a brother, working as an auto mechanic) starting a very rocky romance, after her earlier fiancé, a salesman, had left town for better opportunity.

=== Season 3 ===
Season 3 is set in 1934–1935. May Bailey is able to reopen the mine, but she changes operations to nickel instead of silver. Shady bankers and developers try to swindle her, and a clergyman absconds with the homeless shelter's funds. Meanwhile, her daughter Grace continues her search for love after Del Sutton leaves town. Hub comes of age, and falls in love with Alice MacFarlane, whose father was blinded by the mining accident. May's oldest son Bob resigns from the mine office, moves to Toronto with Toppy and their daughter, but then becomes separated from his wife Toppy, who moves back alone to New Bedford. Meanwhile, Honey, trying to help unfortunate people, falls ill from contagious influenza and pneumonia and must leave town for medical treatment.

=== Season 4 ===
Season 4 is set in 1935–1936. Max is struggling to support four children on his own while Honey is still away at a tuberculosis sanitorium. May suffers a stroke and receives home therapy. Grace grows closer to widowed school teacher Jim Flett while exploring journalism, and eventually he kisses her in the last episode of the season. Hub is thrilled that Alice MacFarlane has returned to town, but finds that she became pregnant while away in Toronto. Fat develops a friendship with Jim's precocious son Pritchard. In the process of a divorce, Toppy finds she is shunned by the other women in town. A recast Honey returns to town with a clean bill of health.

=== Season 5 ===
Season 5 is set in 1936. After Jim Flett decides he is not ready for a relationship, Grace meets a charming stranger at the hotel cafe from out of town who proposes to her, and they elope to his large house, where he is eventually exposed as a faker. Hub thinks about joining the priesthood. Honey adjusts to living in New Bedford again, but finds that she wishes to further her education while Max considers running for mayor. The show was abruptly cancelled at the termination of the fifth season.

=== Christmas movie ===
Meant to tie up some of the loose ends left when the series was cancelled, A Wind at My Back Christmas takes place in December 1938. Hub is studying to become a priest, but starts to have second thoughts as he spends more and more time with music student Anna Schiller (Meredith Henderson). When he finds out her status as a Jewish refugee who escaped from Austria following the Nazi annexation, Hub takes her to New Bedford to keep her from being deported, but faces hostility from his mother, who wants him to become a priest, and his brother, who resents his success. The movie ends with Anna escaping to the United States and Hub deciding not to become a priest. Max and Honey arrange that they will both pursue their dreams. Honey will go to college and Max will finish his novel. Also, Henry announces his interest in joining the RCMP.

The actors who play Grace Bailey, May Bailey, and Pritchard Flett are not in the movie. Their absence is explained through telegrams the family receives from Grace and Jim Flett. Apparently, Grace and May went to Spain to recover the body of Grace's husband, who was killed in the war. As they are returning home, May falls ill, and they are unable to return to Canada for the holidays, while Pritchard, though, went to live with his grandparents in Niagara Falls.

== Home media ==
Sullivan Entertainment released all five seasons and the Christmas special on DVD in Region 1.

In 2016, Sullivan Entertainment announced it would launch their own streaming service called Gazebo TV that would feature the Wind at My Back series among other titles produced by the company. The service launched in early 2017.

== International broadcasters ==
In the United States, Wind at My Back first aired on Encore WAM! and then on the Odyssey Network, which later became the Hallmark Channel. Its last airing on Hallmark was in 2001. At the beginning of 2010, the series was picked up by BYU Television as part of its Friday night lineup, and later expanded to weekdays. Later that same year, the series was picked up by PTL Satellite Network-rebranded The Inspiration Network to air weekdays.

== Filming locations ==
The first season of "Wind at My Back" was shot on location in several towns near Toronto, including Tottenham, Bowmanville, Orono and Port Perry. In the town of Bowmanville, located one hour east of Toronto, filming occurred at the Bowmanville Museum, which served as May Bailey's home. The school exterior was also filmed on the same street. Tyrone Mills near Bowmanville provided the exterior of the New Bedford Mine office. Other locations included Brookdale Pond in Uxbridge, Ontario, the location of the Bailey family's Bass Lake Cottage, as well as Jacksons Point, Ontario.

After the first season, Sullivan Entertainment built the town's exterior on the backlot of their studio to minimize the time and cost of transportation. Most of Season 2-5 was filmed on the backlot, though they went on location as necessary.

== Depiction in memoirs ==
The show was a favourite of Rush drummer Neil Peart, who talks of watching the show in his second memoir, describing the series as being like a Canadian version of The Waltons.
