= Susan French =

American actress (1912–2003)

- Born: Susan French Moultrie; January 23, 1912; Los Angeles, California, U.S.
- Died: April 6, 2003 (aged 91); Santa Monica, California, U.S.
- Education: American Academy of Dramatic Arts
- Occupations: Actress; puppeteer
- Years active: 1965–1997
- Spouse(s): Donald Richard French; Eliot (or Eliott) William Smith

Susan French Moultrie (January 23, 1912 – April 6, 2003) was an American stage, television, and film actress and puppeteer

== Early years ==
French was born in 1912 in Los Angeles, and was the daughter of Lloyd Moultrie, a show-business lawyer. She was a graduate of the American Academy of Dramatic Arts and the Marlborough School in Los Angeles.

== Career ==
French appeared in two Broadway plays early in her career and worked in radio, as well as a photographic stylist for three national magazines. She and her sister worked as riveters for the Douglas Aircraft Company during World War II, and she helped start a theater group there.

French appeared in the TV movie People Like Us (1990). She also played the roles of Mrs. Shaw in the 1979 TV movie Captain America II: Death Too Soon, and Bessie Gilmore in The Executioner's Song (1982). French acted in the soap opera Bare Essence (1982–1983) and appeared in episodes of The Alfred Hitchcock Hour, Dallas, Falcon Crest, The Colbys, L.A. Law, Little House on the Prairie, Moonlighting, Quantum Leap, Perfect Strangers, Remington Steele, and Star Trek: The Next Generation. Her final television appearance was in an episode of Picket Fences. In addition, she had a recurring role on the CBS TV series Cagney & Lacey as Mrs. Skimmins.

French appeared in Universal's 1980 film Somewhere in Time, starring Christopher Reeve and Jane Seymour, and her other film credits include The Impossible Years (1968), Jaws 2 (1978), House (1985), The Verne Miller Story (1987), Flatliners (1990) and Younger and Younger (1993).

Her last film role was in the live-action version of Fist of the North Star (1995).

=== Recognition ===
The Academy of Science Fiction, Fantasy and Horror Films designated her as the best supporting actress for her performance in Somewhere in Time.

== Personal life and death ==
After her divorce from Donald Richard French, she married Eliot (or Eliott) William Smith in New York City on September 17, 1943. She died in Santa Monica, California, on April 6, 2003, aged 91.

== Filmography ==
Year	Title	Role	Notes
1968	The Impossible Years	Miss Hammer	
1969	Justine	Clerk	Uncredited
1973	The Sting	Landlady	Uncredited
1974	Airport 1975	Violet - Passenger	Uncredited
1975	The Hindenburg	Miss Grant	Uncredited
1978	Jaws 2	Old Lady	
1980	Somewhere in Time	Older Elise	
1985	House	Aunt Elizabeth	
1987	The Verne Miller Story	Bearded Lady	
1990	Flatliners	Terminal Woman	
1992	Exiled in America	Old Lady	
1993	Younger and Younger	Grace	
1995	Fist of the North Star	Old Woman	

=== Television ===
Year	Title	Role	Notes
1980	Honor Thy Elders	Mrs. Morgan	
1988	Perfect Strangers	Mrs. Van Wisser	S3, E20
1992	Star Trek: The Next Generation	Sev Maylor	
1993	Grace Under Fire	Lady in bathroom	
