= Laura Bruneau =

Canadian actress

- Occupation: Actress
- Known for: Material World, Wind at My Back

Laura Bruneau is a Canadian actress, best known for her lead roles in the television series Material World and Wind at My Back.

Originally from North Vancouver, British Columbia, she studied at the American Academy of Dramatic Arts for two years before returning to Canada, where she acted on stage in Vancouver and had guest roles in Hangin' In and The Beachcombers. In 1983, she was cast in the American prime time soap opera Bare Essence, which was cancelled after twelve episodes. She remained in the United States for a few more years, appearing in an episode of Knight Rider and working with a comedy troupe which produced several sketches for the syndicated series PM Magazine, before returning to Canada again when she was cast in a pilot created by Louis Del Grande which did not make it to series. She then had guest roles in Street Legal, Counterstrike and Katts and Dog, and the television film Love and Hate: The Story of Colin and JoAnn Thatcher, before being cast as Kitty, the lead character, in Material World.

After Material World was cancelled in 1993, Bruneau had guest roles in the television series Matrix, The Outer Limits and Two before being cast in Wind at My Back as Honey Bailey, following the departure of Cynthia Belliveau from the series. She played the role for the final season of the series and in the follow-up television film A Wind at My Back Christmas.

== Filmography ==
Laura Bruneau film and television credits
Year	Title	Role	Notes	Ref.
1982	Hangin' In	Natalie	1 episode	
1982	The Beachcombers	Unknown	1 episode	
1983	Bare Essence	Cathy	11 episodes	
1983	Knight Rider	Cara Caulfield	1 episode	
1989	Katts and Dog	Unknown	1 episode	
1989	Love and Hate: The Story of Colin and JoAnn Thatcher	Unknown	Television film	
1990	Street Legal	Doreen Collier	1 episode	
1990	Counterstrike	Amy	Episode: "A Little Purity"	
1990–1993	Material World	Kitty Reeves	Lead role	
1992	Mr. Dressup	herself	Episode: 25th Anniversary	
1993	Matrix	Robin Reeves	1 episode	
1995	The Outer Limits	Sharon Rosman	1 episode	
1996	Two	Barbara Turnbull	1 episode	
1997	Little Ghost	Joanne	Theatrical film	
2001	Wind at My Back	Honey Bailey	Lead role	
2001	A Wind at My Back Christmas	Honey Bailey	Television film	
