= The Betsy =

1978 film directed by Daniel Petrie

- Theatrical release poster
- Directed by: Daniel Petrie
- Screenplay by: William Bast; Walter Bernstein
- Based on: The Betsy by Harold Robbins
- Produced by: Robert R. Weston
- Starring: Laurence Olivier; Robert Duvall; Katharine Ross; Tommy Lee Jones; Jane Alexander
- Cinematography: Mario Tosi
- Edited by: Rita Roland
- Music by: John Barry
- Production companies: Allied Artists; Harold Robbins International Company
- Distributed by: Allied Artists; United Artists
- Release date: February 9, 1978
- Running time: 125 minutes
- Country: United States
- Language: English
- Budget: $6 million or $5.2 million
- Box office: $17.7 million

The Betsy is a 1978 American romantic drama film directed by Daniel Petrie, from a screenplay by William Bast and Walter Bernstein, based on the 1971 novel of the same title by Harold Robbins. It stars Laurence Olivier as a retired auto tycoon, with Robert Duvall, Katharine Ross, Tommy Lee Jones, and Jane Alexander in supporting roles.

The film was theatrically released in the United States on February 9, 1978, by Allied Artists and United Artists. Robbins considered The Betsy the best movie adaptation of any of his works.

The film was one of the last financed by Allied Artists.

== Plot ==
A Detroit automotive conglomerate has fallen on tough times, particularly as an automobile manufacturer. While the aging Loren Hardeman Sr. remains the titular head of the company, his grandson Loren Hardeman III runs the company as President. Under his guidance the business has diversified, but while III sees the automobile division as having dwindling value, Hardeman Sr still desires to see the company reinvigorate itself (and vicariously, himself).

Hardeman Sr. decides that the company needs to invest in a new model of car, a ground-breaking fuel-efficient car named for his great-granddaughter; "Betsy". To achieve this goal he engages Angelo Perino, a racing driver, to design and bring the car to fruition.

Perino is immediately drawn into both the feud between duelling visions for the future of the company, and intertwining romantic relationships with both the young Betsy, soon to turn 21 and come into her inheritance, and Lady Bobby Ayres who is the mistress of Hardeman III.

The feud between Hardeman Sr. and Hardeman III is made more complex by the Hardeman III’s knowledge that Sr. had an affair with his mother.

== Cast ==
- Laurence Olivier as Loren Hardeman Sr.
- Tommy Lee Jones as Angelo Perino
- Robert Duvall as Loren Hardeman III
- Katharine Ross as Sally Hardeman
- Jane Alexander as Alicia Hardeman
- Lesley-Anne Down as Lady Ayres
- Kathleen Beller as Betsy
- Joseph Wiseman as Jake Weinstein
- Edward Herrmann as Dan Weyman
- Paul Ryan Rudd as Loren Hardeman Jr.
- Charlie Fields as young Loren Hardeman III

== Production ==
Harold Robbins formed his own company to make film and television projects, Harold Robbins Productions. He wanted Al Pacino and John Wayne to play the leads. The film was going to be made by Warner Bros but they pulled out. By 1975 the film was set up at Allied Artists. Allied brought in United Artists as partners and they offered the film to Donald Petrie to direct.

Steve McQueen and Ali MacGraw were offered the leads but turned it down. The first draft was done by Walter Bernstein, then William Bast was bought in. Laurence Olivier later had Ivan Moffat work on his dialogue.

Assembly-plant footage was filmed at the American Motors (AMC) Kenosha, Wisconsin factory. It shows construction and painting of 1978 Gremlin, Pacer, and Concord models on AMC's assembly line serving as the factory of the fictitious Bethlehem Motors. For authenticity, the film's producers learned from AMC about how new cars are developed. The titular car is a slightly modified 1974 Lancia Beta coupe.

The Betsy features music composed by John Barry. It was filmed at Rosecliff mansion in Newport, Rhode Island.

A review by automobile industry expert Alex Taylor noted that the filmmakers did not show believable characters and realistic dialogue. Attempts by Hollywood to capture the auto industry on film, such as The Betsy, have "aimed at realistic drama but wound up with suds."

By 1978 there had been a notable increase in the construction of racquetball courts in the United States, so Petrie chose to shoot a scene in a company racquetball court during the first meeting between the characters played by Tommy Lee Jones and Robert Duvall.

According to Bast "The studio found Dan's cut to be rather tame, so he went back and filmed an additional sex scene between Lesley-Anne Down and Tommy Lee Jones, in a rented hotel room, as I recall. It seemed like they were looking for a R rating, although nobody ever said so, of course."

== Reception ==
=== Box office ===
The film opened in 473 theaters and grossed a record opening weekend for Allied Artists of $2,727,084. The film earned rentals of $7.85 million in the United States and Canada.

Robbins said "none of us ever made any money off that movie" due to the fact Allied Artists went into bankruptcy in 1980. "Too bad... because I think it was a great movie."

=== Critical ===
Most of the reviews of the film were negative. Chicago Tribune reviewer Gene Siskel offered a damning critique of the film:

Of course "The Betsy" is trash. That's what it's supposed to be. That's what its audience wants, the same huge audience that buys every one of Harold Robbins' trashy novels.

An advertisement for the film claims that "the most dynamic, sexy, powerful people are Harold Robbins people." That's a polite way of saying that Robbins books, and the films upon which they are based, serve up super soft-core porn in luxurious surroundings.

How else do you explain the following tasteless scene, which inexplicably occurs in the middle of a saga of an automotive scion's attempt to build one last great car. In action that lasts one minute, the scion's 5-year-old grandson watches his homosexual father blow his brains out in a car. Then the crying kid runs upstairs to his mother's bedroom only to discover that Mom is shacked up with Gramps!

It would be easy to laugh off that scene as just so much tastelessness, yet I can't help but think that some of the upright folks who patronize "The Betsy" for scenes like that are the same people who also complain about the horrible language their children are exposed to in a fine film like "Saturday Night Fever."

Now, if you're thinking that if you caught me in private I might admit that "The Betsy" is a good trashy movie, well, don't bet on it. I did enjoy last year's "The Other Side of Midnight," and it was a good trashy movie. Why? Because there was a joy-of-performing quality to it. By comparison, "The Betsy" characters take themselves too seriously. What might have improved this film is just one character, at some point in all the madness, standing up and screaming, "God, what a sick group of people!"

The Boston Evening Globe correspondent Michael Blowen described it as "a Reader's Digest condensation of a television soap opera." In the New York Daily News, Rex Reed stated that "the temptation to compare The Betsy with the Edsel stretches from here to deadline, but this movie is so bad, so numbingly obtuse, so bloatedly pretentious and awesomely corny, no capsule put-down seems adequate. It's The Damned, set in Grosse Pointe. Or, as Tennessee Williams might drawl, it's about 'a lotta things, honey—greed, lust, vice, homosexuality, incest, suicide, murder, and puttin' on airs.'"

The film appears in a chapter of Harry and Michael Medved's book The Golden Turkey Awards titled "The Worst Films Compendium from A (The Adventurers) to Z (Zontar: the Thing from Venus)". The Medveds wrote that "another Harold Robbins book bites the dust as a wretched, melodramatic film. Lord Laurence Olivier’s attempt at a Texas twang is a hilarious flop, as is his incestuous relationship with his daughter-in-law, Katharine Ross." The film is also listed in Golden Raspberry Award founder John Wilson's book The Official Razzie Movie Guide as one of the 100 Most Enjoyably Bad Movies Ever Made.

The Betsy holds a 17% rating on Rotten Tomatoes based on six reviews.
