= Bare Essence =

American soap opera television series

- Genre: Soap opera
- Based on: Bare Essence (1980) by Meredith Rich
- Developed by: Robert Hamilton
- Written by: Robert Hamilton
- Directed by: Walter Grauman
- Starring: Genie Francis; Jennifer O'Neill; Lee Grant; John Dehner; Ian McShane; Michael Woods; Jonathan Frakes; Wendy Fulton; Jaime Lyn Bauer; Al Corley; Susan French
- Theme music composer: Billy Goldenberg
- Composer: Marvin Laird
- Country of origin: United States
- Original language: English
- No. of seasons: 1
- No. of episodes: 11

Production
- Executive producer: Chuck McLain
- Running time: 60 minutes
- Production company: Warner Bros. Television

Original release
- Network: NBC
- Release: February 15 – June 13, 1983

Bare Essence is an American prime time soap opera television series which aired on NBC from February 15 to June 13, 1983, during the 1982–83 season. It starred Genie Francis as Tyger Hayes, and explored the intrigues of the perfume industry.

== Miniseries (1982) ==
Bare Essence first appeared in the form of a two-part, 4-hour TV miniseries shown over two nights on October 4 and 5, 1982 on CBS. Based on the 1980 novel of the same name by Meredith Rich, it was directed by Walter Grauman and written by Robert Hamilton. The miniseries starred Bruce Boxleitner as Chase Marshall, Linda Evans as Lady Bobbi Rowan, Genie Francis as Bobbi's daughter Patricia "Tyger" Hayes, Lee Grant as Ava Marshall, Joel Higgins as Matt Phillips and Donna Mills as Barbara Fisher. Francis Benard, John Dehner, Jonathan Frakes, Susan French, Belinda Montgomery and Tim Thomerson appeared in supporting roles. It garnered excellent ratings, but CBS passed on a proposed series, which NBC picked up instead. By the time the series went to air in February 1983, the roles which had been played in the miniseries by Evans, Mills, Grant, and Boxleitner were taken over respectively by Jennifer O'Neill, Jaime Lyn Bauer, Jessica Walter and Al Corley. Francis reprised the lead role of Tyger in the new series.

== Weekly series (1983) ==
=== Synopsis ===
Bare Essence starred Genie Francis, Ian McShane, Jennifer O'Neill, Jessica Walter and Michael Woods, with Jaime Lyn Bauer, Laura Bruneau, John Dehner, Jonathan Frakes, Susan French and Wendy Fulton in supporting roles. The show revolves around the efforts of Tyger Hayes (Francis) to succeed in the business world. In the first episode, her new husband Chase Marshall (guest star Al Corley) is killed in a racing car accident. Chase's father Hadden (Dehner) opposes Tyger's efforts to join the family business, Kellico, but she is encouraged by Hadden's sister Margaret (French) to try her hand with a new line of perfumes. Ava (Walter), the widow of Hadden's other son, is concerned that any success Tyger might have will undermine the position of her son Marcus (Frakes) in the company. Ava plots with Marcus' wife Muffin (Fulton) to undermine Tyger's success. It is later revealed that Muffin had Tyger's husband killed when she had someone sabotage his car. Ava eventually seduces and marries Hadden. Tyger's mother, Lady Bobbi Rowan (O'Neill), falls in love with a Greek millionaire, Niko Theopolous (Ian McShane), who wants to exact revenge on the Marshalls. Penny Fuller and Morgan Stevens join the cast midway through the season, while Ted LePlat, Richard Backus, Anulka Dziubinska, Paula Holland and Michael Nader appear in recurring roles.

=== Reception ===
Despite a great deal of promotion (with commercials like "Love her. Use her. Or destroy her. Everyone wants a piece of Tyger Hayes."), Bare Essence was unsuccessful and canceled after its first season, with cliffhangers left unresolved. Christopher Schemering called the series "a routine story of murder and family mayhem" in The Soap Opera Encyclopedia, describing Walter's Ava as "a stock villainess obviously modeled on Joan Collins's Alexis in Dynasty." Tom Shales of The Washington Post wrote that Bare Essence "comes up lacking on almost all counts. A better title would be Bare Minimum." He praised the female cast members, but noted that "writer-director Walter Grauman has given this talent little to do that isn't ridiculous on the face of it."

== Cast ==
Role	Miniseries	Weekly series
Chase Marshall	Bruce Boxleitner	Al Corley
Lady Bobbi Rowan	Linda Evans	Jennifer O'Neill
Patricia "Tyger" Hayes	Genie Francis	Genie Francis
Ava Marshall	Lee Grant	Jessica Walter
Matt Phillips	Joel Higgins	—N/a
Barbara Fisher	Donna Mills	Jaime Lyn Bauer
Armand Habib	Francis Benard	—N/a
Hadden Marshall	John Dehner	John Dehner
Marcus Marshall	Jonathan Frakes	Jonathan Frakes
Margaret Marshall	Susan French	Susan French
Melody Youngblood	Belinda Montgomery	—N/a
Billy Youngblood	Tim Thomerson	—N/a
Niko Theophilus	—N/a	Ian McShane
Sean Benedict	—N/a	Michael Woods
Cathy	—N/a	Laura Bruneau
Muffin Marshall	Wendy Fulton	Wendy Fulton

== Episodes ==
Season	Episodes	Originally released	
Season	Episodes	First released	Last released
Miniseries	2	October 4, 1982	October 5, 1982
1	11	February 15, 1983	June 13, 1983

=== Miniseries (1982) ===
No.	Title	Directed by	Written by	Original release date	US viewers (millions)
1	"Part 1"	Walter Grauman	Teleplay by : Robert Hamilton	October 4, 1982	19.7
2	"Part 2"	Walter Grauman	Teleplay by : Robert Hamilton	October 5, 1982	22.4

=== Season 1 (1983) ===
No.	Title	Directed by	Written by	Original release date	US viewers (millions)
1	"Hour One & Two"	Walter Grauman	Robert Hamilton	February 15, 1983	15.0
2	"Hour One & Two"	Walter Grauman	Robert Hamilton	February 15, 1983	15.0
3	"Hour Three"	Walter Grauman	Robert Hamilton	February 22, 1983	14.3
4	"Hour Four"	Walter Grauman	Robert Hamilton	March 1, 1983	11.9
5	"Hour Five"	Walter Grauman	Robert Hamilton	March 25, 1983	10.7
6	"Hour Six"	Walter Grauman	Robert Hamilton	April 1, 1983	10.3
7	"Hour Seven"	Walter Grauman	Story by : Robert Hamilton & Pat Falken Smith; Teleplay by : Robert Hamilton	April 8, 1983	10.1
8	"Hour Eight"	Walter Grauman	Kathleen A. Shelley	April 15, 1983	8.9
9	"Hour Nine"	Walter Grauman	Kathleen A. Shelley	April 29, 1983	10.2
10	"Bare Essence: The Final Chapter"	Walter Grauman	James Fritzhand	June 13, 1983	13.5
11	"Bare Essence: The Final Chapter"	Walter Grauman	James Fritzhand	June 13, 1983	13.5

== US TV ratings ==
Season	Episodes	Start date	End date	Nielsen rank	Nielsen rating
1982–83	11	February 15, 1983	June 13, 1983	85	11.9
