= The Disappearance of Christina =

- VHS cover
- Written by: Camille Thomasson
- Directed by: Karen Arthur
- Starring: John Stamos; Kim Delaney; CCH Pounder; Robert Carradine; Claire Yarlett
- Music by: David Michael Frank
- Country of origin: United States
- Original language: English

Production
- Producer: Barry M. Berg
- Cinematography: Tom Neuwirth
- Editor: Caroline Biggerstaff
- Running time: 93 min.
- Production companies: B.A.L. Productions; Ubu Productions; Universal Television

Original release
- Release: November 4, 1993

The Disappearance of Christina is a 1993 television film, starring John Stamos, Kim Delaney, CCH Pounder, Robert Carradine, and Claire Yarlett. It was written by Camille Thomasson and directed by Karen Arthur.

== Plot ==
Joe Seldon is a Los Angeles businessman who is married to his wife Christina and works with his best friend Mike Croft. One day while Joe and Christina are out sailing with Mike and his wife Lily on their boat, Christina disappears while out on the deck alone.

The next day, Joe talks with police detective Davis. Joe claims that his marriage was fine, but Davis shows him divorce papers signed by Christina two days before she disappeared. Joe later has a dream of Christina trying to drown him. Several days later, Mike and Lily visit Joe to check up on him and bring him some food, and Joe tells them that Christina had filed for divorce. Mike suggests that Christina either committed suicide or accidentally fell overboard. Before Mike and Lily leave, Joe gets a phone call, but the person on the line just hangs up. Later that day, Joe gets a phone call from a voice that sounds like Christina who says, “I’m sorry I didn’t say goodbye.”

That evening, Joe attends a fundraiser honoring Christina. Joe tells Mike that Christina called, but Mike and Lily start to become concerned with Joe’s state of mind. At home, Joe examines Christina’s date book and has another dream about Christina. He wakes up in the middle of the night, thinks he sees somebody in his house, and runs downstairs to find Christina’s date book gone.

Joe goes back to work and tells Mike that Christina was inside the house the night before. Concerned, Mike takes him to a doctor to get him medication. Joe then has lunch with Lily, who reveals that Mike is having an affair. Joe tells Lily that Christina was in the house the night before, but Lily believes him. They both go to a psychiatric hospital to talk to Christina’s sister Madeleine, but she is incoherent and unhelpful, claiming that Christina visited the day before and then “flew away.” Joe spots Christina’s bracelet on Madeleine’s wrist and tries to wrestle it away, but Madeleine screams and becomes erratic. Davis later confronts Joe, claiming that he assaulted Madeleine and that there was no bracelet.

Late that night, Joe hears his dryer running and discovers Christina’s red dress inside. Joe hides it, but the maid finds it and takes it to the police. He is arrested for murder but quickly released due to a lack of hard evidence. Joe and Lily go to the coroner’s office to identify Christina’s body, but it turns out not to be hers. Davis is certain that Joe killed Christina, but Lily tells Davis that she believes Christina is still alive.

Joe and Mike have problems at work due to unexplained financial discrepancies in a big construction project they are working on. Joe tries to talk to Mike about Mike and Lily’s marriage, and Mike confesses that he wishes Lily had been the one who disappeared. While making phone calls to figure out the financial discrepancies, Joe is told that Christina signed off on one of the accounts. Searching through financial records in Mike’s office, Joe finds Christina’s date book and a gun.

Joe visits Lily at her home while Mike is away. They conclude that Mike and Christina are having an affair, are behind the missing funds at work, and plan to run away together. They go to the marina, inspect the boat, and discover a secret crawl space in the cabin where Christina could have hidden.

At work the next day, Joe asks Lily to follow Mike and see where he is going at lunch time. Lily and Joe go to a condo overlooking the marina, where Lily says Mike just went. The clerk confirms that Mike and a woman looking like Christina got the condo in February. After exploring the room, Lily becomes emotional. They return to Joe’s house, where Lily begins to undress in front of Joe. They start to make love, but Joe cannot continue, as he is still in love with Christina, but Lily is furious and heartbroken.

Joe confronts Mike at the office and accuses him of having an affair with Christina and helping her fake her death. At gun point, Mike confesses that he did have an affair with Christina, but long ago. He claims that he has not been to the condo since March, that he hasn’t seen Christina since she disappeared, and that at lunch time he has been seeing a psychiatrist. He says he got the gun because he was contemplating suicide.

Joe exits the building while Lily, dressed like Christina, rides the elevator up to Mike’s office, just missing each other. Joe makes a phone call and confirms that Mike has been seeing a psychiatrist. Lily finds Joe and takes him to her house. Lily admits that she did not follow Mike to the condo that day, admits to stealing the construction project money, and confesses to having just killed Mike. Joe hears an old answering machine message from Christina to Lily saying “I’m sorry I didn’t say goodbye.” Joe realizes that Lily has been gaslighting Joe—the message, the dress, the bracelet—and making him believe that Christina was still alive. Lily says she loves Joe and wants them to run away together, but Joe calls her crazy and tries to walk away as Davis and other police arrive. Lily shoots Joe, but Davis shoots Lily. As she dies, Joe asks Lily why she killed Christina, but she claims she didn’t.

Detective Davis visits Joe in the hospital and tells him that the red dress he found was brand new and had never been worn. Joe tells her that he found it strangely reassuring that Christina was possibly framing him for her murder, because it would have at least meant she was alive. He is crushed that he will never know what happened to her.

In the final scene, Joe watches the sunset by the water and walks away. A woman—implied to be Christina—walks to Joe’s spot and watches the sunset.

== Cast ==
- John Stamos as Joe Seldon
- Kim Delaney as Lily Kroft
- CCH Pounder as Detective Davis
- Robert Carradine as Michael Croft
- Claire Yarlett as Christina Seldon

== Reception ==
TV Guide gave the film only one star out of five and stated: "A made-for-cable-TV feature released to home video, THE DISAPPEARANCE OF CHRISTINA is a frustrating suspense drama, mostly formula until a surprise conclusion that's only a surprise because there's no surprise." Dominic Griffin from Variety magazine wrote: "John Stamos stars in this murder mystery about a man whose life falls apart after his wife disappears and he's accused of her murder. What could have been a generic missing-persons movie is vastly improved by some exciting and interesting story twists."
