= Jacqueline Babbin =

Jacqueline Babbin (July 26, 1926 – October 6, 2001) was an American television/theatre writer, producer, and executive.

== Early life ==
Jacqueline Babbin was born on July 26, 1926, in New York City, in the borough of Manhattan. She entered high school at the age of eleven and Smith College at fifteen. She worked as an assistant to the renowned literary agent Audrey Wood in 1943, and Irene Selznick. She was briefly married to a Warner Bros. executive.

== Career ==
Babbin began her television career in 1954 at David Susskind’s production company Talent Associates, starting out as a script editor. She formed a successful writing partnership with Audrey Gellen. The two women collaborated on several adaptations of stage plays, including Harvey, The Browning Version, Ethan Frome, The Member of The Wedding, Our Town and Billy Budd.

In 1961, Susskind and Babbin produced a short-lived dramatic anthology, Way Out, which was a series of macabre stories by Roald Dahl. They also continued their collaboration throughout the decade as producers on TV specials, including Hedda Gabler (with Ingrid Bergman and Michael Redgrave), and The Crucible (with George C. Scott, Colleen Dewhurst and Fritz Weaver).

From 1979 to 1982, Babbin served as vice president, Novels For Television and Miniseries for ABC Entertainment. In 1982, she was hired by ABC Daytime and Agnes Nixon to be the executive producer of All My Children. During her tenure there, she hired Elizabeth Taylor and Carol Burnett as guest stars. She left All My Children in 1986, began writing novels shortly after, and became the executive producer of Loving in 1990.

Some of Babbin's other projects included the TV series The Best of Everything (1970) and Beacon Hill (1975), the TV movies Sybil (1976), Brave New World (1980), and the first TV adaptation of The Glass Menagerie (CBS Playhouse, 1966).

She died of cancer on October 6, 2001, in Kent, Connecticut.

== Novels ==
- Prime Time Corpse
- Bloody Soaps

== Recognition ==
She was nominated for five Daytime Emmy Awards and a single Primetime Emmy Award.
