= Paul Ryan Rudd =

American actor (1940–2010)

- Born: Paul Kenneth Rudd; May 15, 1940; Boston, Massachusetts, U.S.
- Died: August 12, 2010 (aged 70); Greenwich, Connecticut, U.S.
- Other name: Paul Rudd (as billed through his career)
- Occupations: Actor, theatre director, professor
- Spouse(s): Joan Mannion (divorced); Martha Bannerman (1983–2010; his death)
- Children: 3

Paul Ryan Rudd (born Paul Kenneth Rudd; May 15, 1940 – August 12, 2010) was an American actor, theatre director and professor.

He appeared as the title character in a 1976 production of Shakespeare's Henry V, opposite Meryl Streep as his love interest. Though best known for his live theatre performances, such as those on Broadway and the New York Shakespeare Festival, he also appeared in the 1978 film The Betsy and on television in the 1975 short-lived series Beacon Hill as Brian Mallory, the scheming Irish chauffeur.

== Biography ==
=== Early life ===
He was born in Boston, Massachusetts, on May 15, 1940. He attended Boston Latin School and later Assumption Preparatory School, graduating in 1958. He earned a degree in psychology from Fairfield University.

Originally named Paul Kenneth Rudd, he adopted Ryan as his middle name from his mother Kathryn's maiden name. He studied for the Catholic priesthood but left, recognizing that the vocation was not for him. At some point, he married Joan Mannion, whom he later divorced.

=== Acting career ===
Rudd worked in entertainment from 1967–86, variously as actor or as director, both on and off-Broadway. He landed his first significant Broadway role in 1974 as Ken, the lobotomized motorcyclist, in The National Health by Peter Nichols. His name was in the credits of the 1975 revivals of Ah, Wilderness! (co-starring Geraldine Fitzgerald, Swoosie Kurtz and Teresa Wright) and The Glass Menagerie as the "Gentleman Caller" (along with Maureen Stapleton, Pamela Payton-Wright and Rip Torn). He portrayed Barry Copley in the Williamstown Theater Festival's 1973 production of 'The Changing Room', sharing the stage with John Lithgow.

In 1976, he starred as Billy, the tortured young soldier, in David Rabe's Streamers. That year, he also played the title role of Henry V with the New York Shakespeare Festival opposite Meryl Streep as Katherine, whom he marries in the play. He played in Theodore Mann's Romeo and Juliet as Romeo, with Pamela Payton-Wright as Juliet in 1977.

Said Clive Barnes, of The New York Times: "Paul Rudd makes a taut-nerved Romeo, his handsome face either tense with pain or almost consciously relaxed and sunny. He speaks the verse very well, with intelligent nuances, and his ardent death wish at the end is most impressive."

In 1979, Rudd starred as Scooper in Bosoms and Neglect opposite Marian Mercer.

In 1975, he played Brian Mallory in the short-lived television series Beacon Hill. In 1977, he portrayed John F. Kennedy in the NBC TV movie Johnny, We Hardly Knew Ye. He went on to appear in The Betsy, the 1978 film based on the Harold Robbins novel.

Rudd married his second wife, Martha Bannerman, in 1983. They eventually had three children: Graeme, Kathryn and Eliza. During this time, Rudd held guest roles in several television shows, including Hart to Hart, Moonlighting, Knots Landing and Murder, She Wrote.

In 1986, Rudd retired from acting to raise his children, moving his family from Los Angeles to his Greenwich, Connecticut near his native Massachusetts.

=== Later years ===
Later in life, Rudd taught at local middle schools and high schools on the subjects of theater, especially Shakespeare, and poetry. He was part of the theater faculty at Sarah Lawrence College from 1999 to 2006.

Rudd came briefly out of retirement for a 2000 production of A Midsummer Night's Dream, playing the double role of Oberon and Theseus–perhaps inspired by a production of the same play he saw at Shakespeare's Globe Theatre while visiting London. Starting in 2004, Rudd was a teaching faculty member and associate director of the MFA drama program at the New School for Drama until his death.

== Death ==
Rudd died at his Greenwich, Connecticut home at the age of 70 from pancreatic cancer. He was survived by his wife, Martha, and three children.

== Filmography ==
Year	Title	Role	Notes
1975	Beacon Hill	Brian Mallory	
1978	The Betsy	Loren Hardeman Jr.	
1979	Hart to Hart	Kreeger	Season 1 Episode 9 "A New Kind Of High"
1980	Beulah Land	Leon Kendrick	
1980-1981	Knots Landing	Earl Trent	
1983	Hart to Hart	Dr. Michael Barber	Season 4 Episode 16 "Bahama Bound Harts"
1983	Quincy, M.E.	Kenny Kelso	Season 8 Episode 24 "The Cutting Edge"
1984	Murder, She Wrote	Palmer Eddington	Season 1 Episode 10 "Death Takes a Curtain Call"
1985	Moonlighting	Accomplice	Season 2 Episode 8 "Portrait of Maddie"
1986	Kung Fu: The Movie	Reverend Lawrence Perkins	
