= Material World (TV series) =

- Starring: Laura Bruneau; Linda Sorenson; Chris Potter; Jayne Eastwood; Angela Dohrmann; Karen LeBlanc; James Kee; Jack Kruschen
- Country of origin: Canada
- No. of seasons: 4
- No. of episodes: 38

Production
- Running time: Approx. 22 minutes

Original release
- Network: CBC
- Release: February 5, 1990 – March 1, 1993

Material World is a Canadian television sitcom, which aired on CBC Television from 1990 to 1993. In its first season, the show was a conventional sitcom, shot on videotape with a laugh track, but in subsequent seasons the show adopted a single-cam comedy drama format.

The show starred Laura Bruneau as Kitty, a Toronto fashion designer. The cast also included Linda Sorenson as Kitty's mother Virginia (seasons 1–4), Jayne Eastwood as her office assistant Bernice (seasons 1–3), Chris Potter as her boyfriend Tim (seasons 1–3), Jack Kruschen as her grandfather Fred Avery (seasons 1–3), Angela Dohrmann as her downstairs neighbor and then roommate Angela (seasons 3–4), James Kee as her business partner Martin (seasons 3–4), and Karen LeBlanc as her store employee Lucy (season 4).

The show's original theme song, "World of Wonder", was composed by series creator Jane Ford and performed by actress and singer Taborah Johnson. Johnson, who is the sister of actor Clark Johnson, appeared in the opening credits, singing the song on a street corner. Season four saw a change to the opening credits sequence, using Bob Wiseman's "What the Astronaut Noticed and Then Suggested" as its new theme music.

It won the Gemini Award for Best Comedy Series at the 5th Gemini Awards in 1990.

== Episodes ==
=== Series overview ===
| Season | Episodes | Originally released | |
| Season | Episodes | First released | Last released |
|---|---|---|---|
| 1 | 6 | February 5, 1990 | March 12, 1990 |
| 2 | 6 | March 11, 1991 | April 15, 1991 |
| 3 | 13 | November 4, 1991 | March 9, 1992 |
| 4 | 13 | November 5, 1992 | March 1, 1993 |

=== Season 1 (1990) ===
| No. overall | No. in season | Title | Original release date |
|---|---|---|---|
| 1 | 1 | "Episode 1.1" | February 5, 1990 |
Kitty launches her own fashion business despite her grandfather's interference.
| 2 | 2 | "Episode 1.2" | February 12, 1990 |
A top fashion writer puts Kitty on a new TV show. Kitty learns that currying the friendship of a fashion columnist can be life-threatening.
| 3 | 3 | "Episode 1.3" | February 19, 1990 |
Kitty falls for a fashion photographer who turns out to be gay.
| 4 | 4 | "Episode 1.4" | February 26, 1990 |
Kitty's mother interferes with her possible success as an international fashion designer.
| 5 | 5 | "Episode 1.5" | March 5, 1990 |
-
| 6 | 6 | "Episode 1.6" | March 12, 1990 |
Kitty worries how her mother will react when she learns of an impending visit by her father, who left Virginia years ago for another woman.

=== Season 2 (1991) ===
| No. overall | No. in season | Title | Original release date |
|---|---|---|---|
| 7 | 1 | "Member of the Wedding" | March 11, 1991 |
Kitty is asked to be a bridesmaid at the wedding of her best girlhood friend. When the groom turns out to be abusive, Kitty helps the bride-to-be see his flaws and think twice before going to the altar.
| 8 | 2 | "The Most Important Thing" | March 18, 1991 |
Kitty gets involved in an AIDS benefit fashion show and meets a gay man who has the disease. He ends up in the hospital.
| 9 | 3 | "The Birthday Party" | March 25, 1991 |
Upset that she's turning 49, Virginia waxes nostalgic about Kitty's 13th birthday.
| 10 | 4 | "The Little Me" | April 1, 1991 |
Kitty's loses her self confidence after her designs are rejected by a buyer.
| 11 | 5 | "The Trouble With Pam" | April 8, 1991 |
Kitty is attracted to Tim, who is dating Pam.
| 12 | 6 | "Confessions of a Third Wheel" | April 15, 1991 |
Kitty confides in Bernice.

=== Season 3 (1991–92) ===
| No. overall | No. in season | Title | Directed by | Written by | Original release date |
|---|---|---|---|---|---|
| 13 | 1 | "Carry Your Heart" | Unknown | Unknown | November 4, 1991 |
Kitty struggles to accept the sudden news that her beloved grandfather has died. Adding to her struggle is the fact that her mother kept his serious illness a secret.
| 14 | 2 | "My Favourite Martin" | Unknown | Unknown | November 11, 1991 |
Kitty hopes that taking on a new partner will resolve some of her financial problems, and then struggles with her decision when he insists that she lay someone off.
| 15 | 3 | "Different for Girls" | Don McCutcheon | Jane Ford & Paul Pogue | November 18, 1991 |
Kitty has to face up to life in the urban jungle when Angela's apartment is broken into. Things go from bad to worse when Kitty and Angela discover a rapist is on the loose in their neighbourhood and the cops have been keeping it from the public.
| 16 | 4 | "Our Boyfriends, Ourselves" | Unknown | Unknown | November 25, 1991 |
Kitty and Tim turn to each other on the rebound.
| 17 | 5 | "Getting to Know You" | Unknown | Unknown | December 9, 1991 |
Kitty's sweet dreams turn into nightmares when she wakes up next to Tim and shortly afterward her mother and Angela arrive on the scene.
| 18 | 6 | "The Picture of My Life" | Unknown | Unknown | January 6, 1992 |
Kitty evaluates her relationship with Tim after she meets an artist at Martin's party.
| 19 | 7 | "The Art Is a Lonely Hunter" | Unknown | Unknown | January 13, 1992 |
Kitty confesses to Tim that she kissed another man.
| 20 | 8 | "Always a Woman" | Unknown | Unknown | January 20, 1992 |
Kitty is terrified by the discovery of a lump in her breast, and doesn't know whom to turn to for comfort.
| 21 | 9 | "The Road to Heaven" | Unknown | Unknown | January 27, 1992 |
Kitty visits a wholeness guru.
| 22 | 10 | "Kitty Chills Out" | Unknown | Unknown | February 3, 1992 |
Kitty and Angela spend a week together.
| 23 | 11 | "Heart and Sold" | Unknown | Unknown | February 24, 1992 |
The focus is on Kitty after one of her dresses is worn to a wedding that gets front-page coverage, but she has trouble dealing with her instant "celebrity" status.
| 24 | 12 | "Death of a Salesman" | Unknown | Unknown | March 2, 1992 |
Martin develops a cologne and names it for Kitty; Tim quits teaching.
| 25 | 13 | "Just a Couple of Working Girls" | Unknown | Unknown | March 9, 1992 |
Martin's cologne smells awful; Kitty learns that she is pregnant.

=== Season 4 (1992-1993) ===
| No. overall | No. in season | Title | Original release date |
|---|---|---|---|
| 26 | 1 | "Things Change" | November 5, 1992 |
Kitty sells Classy Fashions and opens a fashionable Queen Street boutique called Material World, with an apartment above that she and Angela share. Meanwhile, Virginia starts a dating service.
| 27 | 2 | "Leap of Faith" | November 12, 1992 |
Kitty's new teenage employee, Lucy, alarms the customers with her candid honesty.
| 28 | 3 | "It's a Chemistry Thing" | November 19, 1992 |
Kitty becomes jealous when her mother arranges a date for Angela with a medical doctor; Martin spies on his wife.
| 29 | 4 | "A Little Something in Plaid" | November 26, 1992 |
Kitty romances a bagpiper; Virginia romances Martin's father.
| 30 | 5 | "Clash of the Tartans" | December 3, 1992 |
Kitty and Angela both fall for the same street musician; Lucy tells Martin how to make male friends.
| 31 | 6 | "Paying for It" | December 10, 1992 |
Martin dreams up a scheme to help improve business, but Kitty has a plan of her own.
| 32 | 7 | "A Kiss Is a Kiss" | December 17, 1992 |
Kitty's business meeting becomes a date; Martin attends a class being taught by Angela.
| 33 | 8 | "Up to Her Neck" | December 31, 1992 |
Kitty asks Angela for help with a creativity block; Angela has a job setback.
| 34 | 9 | "Double Exposure" | February 1, 1993 |
Lucy is arrested for indecent exposure and Kitty comes to her aid; Martin suspects there is a peeping tom outside his house.
| 35 | 10 | "Straight to the Bone" | February 8, 1993 |
Kitty hires Angela, Lucy and Virginia for a fashion show instead of professional models, in order to show 'real' women in her clothes.
| 36 | 11 | "Lost and Found" | February 15, 1993 |
Kitty is shocked to learn she has a second mother; Martin agrees to take care of his girlfriend's pet ferret.
| 37 | 12 | "Lingering Doubts" | February 22, 1993 |
Kitty and Angela track down Kitty's first boyfriend; Martin tries to prevent his father's marriage proposal to Virginia.
| 38 | 13 | "The Dinner Party" | March 1, 1993 |
Surprise guests, distressed friends and a frozen roast spoil Kitty's careful plans for a perfect dinner party.
