= Claire Yarlett =

British-born American actress (born 1965)

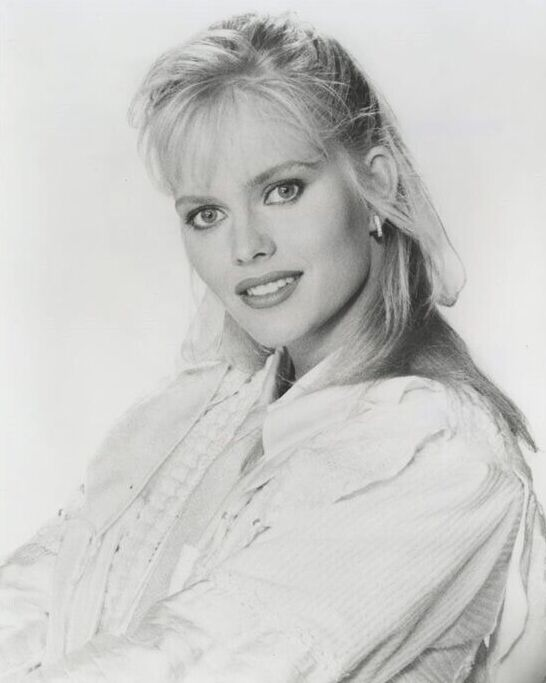
- Yarlett in 1988
- Born: Claire Yarlett; February 15, 1965 (age 60); England, United Kingdom
- Occupation: Actress

Claire Yarlett (born February 15, 1965) is an English-born American actress, best known for her role as Bliss Colby in The Colbys, the spin-off series to the 1980s prime-time soap opera Dynasty. She also starred on the short-lived TV series Robin's Hoods.

== Early years ==
Yarlett's parents are English, and her father was a cinematographer who worked in the United States. During her first four years of elementary school, she lived in Los Angeles during the school year and spent four months in England. Then "somewhere around the fifth grade" the family moved to England, and the schedule was reversed. Her final two years of school were at an English convent. She has dual citizenship.

== Career ==
Yarlett began her acting career on the Rituals soap opera.

== Filmography ==
=== Film ===
Year	Title	Role	Notes
1994	Stranger by Night	Sue Rooney	
2001	Winning London	Ms. Watson	
2001	Life as a House	Receptionist	
2007	Game of Life	Kelly	

=== Television ===
Year	Title	Role	Notes
1984	Rituals	Dakota Lane #1	6 episodes
1985	Dynasty	Bliss Colby	2 episodes
1985–1987	The Colbys	Bliss Colby	45 episodes
1987	Hotel	Blaine Harper	Episode: "Born to Run"
1990–1991	Days of Our Lives	Dr. Whitney Baker	17 episodes
1991	Wings	Stephanie	Episode: "Looking for Love in All the Wrong Places"
1991	Perry Mason: The Case of the Fatal Fashion	Tanya Sloane	Television film
1991	Jake and the Fatman	Monica Florin	Episode: "I Could Write a Book"
1992, 1994	Silk Stalkings	Susan Daniels / Liz Reston	2 episodes
1992	Raven	Sheila Jensen	Episode: "The Death of Sheila"
1993	In the Heat of the Night	Anabel Sloan-Burnette	Episode: "Legacy"
1993	The Disappearance of Christina	Christina Seldon	Television film
1993	Staying Afloat	Lauren Morton	Television film
1993, 1996	Renegade	Joanna Muir / Claire Treadwell	2 episodes
1994	Burke's Law	Tawny Clay	Episode: "Who Killed the Legal Eagle?"
1994–1995	Robin's Hoods	MacKenzie 'Mac' Magnuson	22 episodes
1995	Lois & Clark: The New Adventures of Superman	Dr. Katherine Wilder	Episode: "Target: Jimmy Olsen"
1995	University Hospital	Mac	6 episodes
1995, 1996	High Tide	Chris Chase	2 episodes
1996	Midnight Heat	Jenny	Television film
1996	Hercules: The Legendary Journeys	Thera	Episode: "The Apple"
1997	The Heart Surgeon	Sarah	Television film
1997	Pacific Blue	Shannon Draper	Episode: "Sisters"
1998	ER	Claudia Olson	Episode: "Vanishing Act"
1998	Air America	Harley Shaw	Episode: "Fever"
1998, 2001	Frasier	Vicky	2 episodes
1999	Aftershock: Earthquake in New York	Nancy Stuart	2 episodes
2000	The West Wing	Dr. Jenna Jacobs	Episode: "The Midterms"
2001	Becker	Ms. Alcott	Episode: "The Ugly Truth"
2001	Nash Bridges	Meagan Fells	Episode: "Change Up"
2009	Saving Grace	Linda	Episode: "Do You Believe in Second Chances?"
