= Cynthia Belliveau =

Canadian actress (born 1963)

- Born: February 18, 1963 (age 62); Stratford, Ontario, Canada
- Occupation: Actress
- Years active: 1980–2002

Cynthia Belliveau (born February 18, 1963) is a Canadian former actress. She is best known for her television roles as Terri Morgan in E.N.G., Honey Bailey in Wind at My Back and Dori Lowe in Caitlin's Way. She was a Gemini Award nominee for Canadian Screen Award for Best Actress in a Continuing Leading Dramatic Role at the 12th Gemini Awards in 1998 for Wind at My Back.

She retired from acting in 2002 after having relocated to Los Angeles, California to pursue a career in interior design. She also opened an antique store.

== Early life ==
Originally from Stratford, Ontario, Belliveau was a Miss Teen Canada contestant in 1982 and a Miss Canada contestant in 1983, and worked as a reporter for CKCO-TV in Kitchener, prior to her career as an actress. She was educated at the University of Waterloo.

== Filmography ==
=== Film ===
Year	Title	Role	Notes
1985	Screwballs II	Mona Lott	
1987	Blue Monkey	Alice Bradley	
1987	Goofballs	Holly	
1988	A New Life	Tina	
1988	Night Friend	Maggie	
1989	The Dream Team	Nurse	
1993	The Dark	Tracy	
2001	Criss Cross		

=== Television ===
Year	Title	Role	Notes
1980	Bizarre	Various Characters	1 episode
1986	Check It Out!	Irene	Episode: "Store Wars"
1986	Philip Marlowe, Private Eye	Stella	Episode: "Blackmailers Don't Shoot"
1986	Many Happy Returns	Melanie Haines	Television film
1986	Hot Shots	Maid	Episode: "Roll Over, Agatha Christie"
1986 & 1987	Night Heat	Arlene Grant / Prostitute	2 episodes
1987	Adderly	Leah Frost	Episode: "Headhunter"
1987–1989	Alfred Hitchcock Presents	Cassie Wilson / Mary Donovan / Dana Benson	3 episodes
1988	Starting from Scratch	Shelley Foster	Episode: "James TV Debut"
1988	The Twilight Zone	Sandy	Episode: "20/20 Vision"
1989	War of the Worlds	Karen	Episode: "He Feedeth Among the Lilies"
1989	Murder by Night	Young Woman	Television film
1989–1994	E.N.G.	Terri Morgan	69 episodes
1992	Tropical Heat	Monica Cobb	2 episodes
1992	Maniac Mansion	Julie Brooks	Episode: "Science Is Only Skin Deep"
1992	Rin Tin Tin: K-9 Cop	Claire Arnold	Episode: "Attacked"
1993	Secret Service	Davis	Episode: "Advertising for Crime/Special Delivery"
1993 & 1995	Forever Knight	Alexandra	2 episodes
1994	Kung Fu: The Legend Continues	Cyndi	Episode: "Out of the Woods"
1994	The Spider and the Fly	Blair Delaney	TV movie
1994	Side Effects	Celia	Episode: "The Great Chendini"
1994	TekWar	Trudy	Episode: "Sellout"
1994	Million Dollar Babies	Sally Rand	2 episodes
1995	Goosebumps	Mrs. Webster	Episode: "The Cuckoo Clock Of Doom"
1995	Family of Cops	Melanie Fein	TV movie
1996	X-Men	Spiral	Episode: "Longshot"
1996–1999	Wind at My Back	Honey Bailey Sutton	39 episodes
1997	Breach of Faith: A Family of Cops II	Melanie Fein	TV movie
1997	Family of Cops III: Under Suspicion	Melanie Fein	TV movie
2000–2002	Caitlin's Way	Dori Lowe	52 episodes
2002	Mysterious Ways	Mrs. Cole	Episode: "A Man of God"
