= Max Braithwaite =

Canadian novelist and non-fiction author (1911–1995)

John Victor Maxwell Braithwaite (7 December 1911 – 19 March 1995) was a Canadian novelist and non-fiction author. He was born in Nokomis, Saskatchewan and spent his youth in a number of communities in that province. As an adult he moved to Ontario, living in communities such as Orangeville, Port Carling and finally Brighton where he died at age 83.

Braithwaite won the Stephen Leacock Memorial Medal for Humour in 1972 for his book The Night We Stole the Mountie's Car.

The 1977 Canadian film Why Shoot the Teacher? was based on Braithwaite's 1965 novel of that name.

== Works ==
- 1962: Voices of the Wild
- 1962: The Muffled Man (Little, Brown) ISBN 0-17-602593-6
- 1963: Whooping Crane Adventure
  - 1988 reissue (Gage) ISBN 0-7715-6899-1
- 1965: Why Shoot the Teacher ISBN 0-7710-1599-2, ISBN 0-7710-1602-6
  - 2002 paperback reissue (McClelland and Stewart) ISBN 0-7710-1632-8
- 1967: Canada: wonderland of surprises (Dodd, Mead Wonderland)
- 1968?: Servant or master? A casebook of mass media (Book Society of Canada)
- 1969: Never Sleep Three in a Bed
- 1970: The Western Plains (Natural Science of Canada)
- 1971: The Night We Stole the Mountie's Car (McClelland and Stewart) ISBN 0-7710-1601-8, ISBN 0-7710-1603-4
  - 1975 paperback reissue (McClelland and Stewart) ISBN 0-7710-1603-4
- 1973: A Privilege and a Pleasure (J.J. Douglas) ISBN 0-88894-040-8
- 1974?: Sick kids, the story of the Hospital for Sick Children in Toronto (McClelland and Stewart)
- 1974: Max Braithwaite's Ontario (J.J. Douglas) ISBN 0-88894-064-5
- 1977: The hungry thirties, 1930-1940 (Natural Science of Canada) ISBN 0-919644-25-2
- 1978: Lusty Winter (McClelland and Stewart) ISBN 0-7710-1609-3
- 1979: The Commodore's Barge is Alongside (McClelland and Stewart) ISBN 0-7710-1610-7
- 1981: McGruber's Folly (McClelland and Stewart) ISBN 0-7710-1613-1
- 1986: All the Way Home (McClelland and Stewart) hardcover ISBN 0-7710-1612-3, paperback ISBN 0-7710-1614-X
