= The Colbys =

American prime time soap opera

- Also known as: Dynasty II: The Colbys
- Genre: Soap opera
- Created by: Richard & Esther Shapiro; Robert & Eileen Pollock
- Developed by: William Bast; Paul Huson
- Starring: Charlton Heston; Barbara Stanwyck; John James; Katharine Ross; Stephanie Beacham; Emma Samms; Maxwell Caulfield; Tracy Scoggins; Claire Yarlett; Ricardo Montalbán; Ken Howard; Joseph Campanella; Michael Parks
- Theme music composer: Bill Conti
- Country of origin: United States
- No. of seasons: 2
- No. of episodes: 49 (list of episodes)

Production
- Executive producers: Aaron Spelling; Douglas S. Cramer; Richard & Esther Shapiro
- Running time: 48 minutes
- Production company: Aaron Spelling Productions

Original release
- Network: ABC
- Release: November 20, 1985 – March 26, 1987

Related
- Dynasty (1981–1989); Dynasty: The Reunion (1991); Dynasty (2017–2022)

The Colbys (originally titled Dynasty II: The Colbys) is an American prime time soap opera that originally aired on ABC from November 20, 1985, to March 26, 1987. Created by Richard and Esther Shapiro and Eileen and Robert Pollock and produced by Aaron Spelling, it is a spin-off of Dynasty and revolves around the Colbys, another vastly wealthy family who own a large multinational conglomerate and are connected to the Carringtons of Dynasty. Intended to surpass its predecessor in opulence, the series' producers were handed an immensely high budget for the era, and cast a handful of well-known movie stars among its leads.

The Colbys stars Charlton Heston as tycoon Jason Colby, Barbara Stanwyck as his sister Constance, Stephanie Beacham as his wife Sable, Katharine Ross as Sable's sister and Jason's lover Francesca, and Ricardo Montalbán as Jason's business rival Zach Powers. John James and Emma Samms also star as their Dynasty characters Jeff Colby and Fallon Carrington. The Colbys was ultimately a ratings disappointment, and was cancelled after two seasons.

== Premise ==
On Dynasty, presumed-dead heiress Fallon Carrington Colby (Emma Samms) reappears alive, suffering from amnesia and using the name Randall Adams. Drawn to California after recognizing the name "Colby", she meets playboy Miles Colby (Maxwell Caulfield), not realizing that he is the cousin of her ex-husband, Jeff (John James). A mutual business venture brings the Colbys of California to the Denver mansion of Fallon's father Blake Carrington (John Forsythe).

Set in Los Angeles, The Colbys focuses on the extended Colby family as Jeff relocates to California to start his life anew—and comes face to face with Fallon, now married to his cousin Miles. A fierce rivalry is sparked between Jeff and Miles, and the love triangle spans the series. Miles' father, billionaire Jason Colby (Charlton Heston), has a rocky marriage to the manipulative Sable (Stephanie Beacham), and a longtime attraction to Sable's sister Francesca (Katharine Ross)—Jeff's estranged mother, and the former wife of Jason's deceased brother Philip. Other characters include Jason's powerful sister Constance Colby (Barbara Stanwyck), Miles' twin sister Monica (Tracy Scoggins) and their third sibling Bliss (Claire Yarlett).

In addition to Forsythe's Blake, Dynasty characters Adam Carrington (Gordon Thomson), Steven Carrington (Jack Coleman), and Dominique Deveraux (Diahann Carroll) also made guest appearances on the show between 1985 and 1986.

== Storylines ==
The first season's storylines include the construction of an oil pipeline; Zach Powers' vendetta against the Colbys; the romance between Jason and his brother Philip's widow Francesca; the subsequent collapse of Jason's marriage to Sable; and eventually the revelation that Jason, not Philip, is in fact Jeff's father. There were initially a number of crossovers featuring members of the Dynasty cast, most notably Blake Carrington, his sons Adam and Steven, and half-sister Dominique Deveraux. At the end of the season, Fallon learns that Miles could be the father of her unborn child, Monica's plane crashes, and Sable has Jason arrested for assault and battery, claiming that he had inflicted the injuries she actually sustained by falling down a flight of stairs.

In the second season, Jason manages to divorce Sable and plans to marry Francesca, but the presumed-dead Philip reappears alive. Previously romantically linked to both Zach's nephew and former stepson, Bliss falls in love with a Russian dancer watched by the KGB, the son Monica had given up eight years before re-enters her life, and Constance and Hutch are killed in a plane crash in India. At the end of the season, Miles' wife Channing phones to say she will abort their unborn baby; Sable kidnaps Monica's son; Francesca seemingly dies after a car crash involving herself and Philip; and Fallon, stranded in the desert, is seemingly abducted by aliens who land in a UFO in the finale. The series' most infamous cliffhanger proved to be its last when the series was subsequently cancelled.

=== Aftermath ===
Following the cancellation of The Colbys, the characters of Jeff and Fallon were immediately reintroduced into Dynasty during that series' eighth-season premiere, "The Siege – Part 1" in order for her to recover from her alien abduction experience, though Jeff disbelieves her. Sable (now divorced from Jason, who was still involved with Frankie, who survived the car crash) and Monica (who no longer had contact with ex-lover Cash or their son Scott) also later reappeared on Dynasty for the series' ninth (and final) season in 1988–89. During the final season of Dynasty, it is revealed that Monica and her twin Miles might not have been Jason's children, as Sable had been raped around the time they were conceived. Miles (who refers to Jeff as his half-brother, leading to the assumption that Jason was his and Monica's father after all) later appears in the miniseries Dynasty: The Reunion (1991), reunited with Fallon, and participates in Jeff's rescue from the Consortium. The Jeff-Fallon-Miles love triangle is finally resolved, as Fallon leaves Miles for Jeff once again, and it is loosely implied that Miles becomes involved with Sammy Jo (Heather Locklear).

== Episodes ==
Season	Episodes	Originally released		Rank	Rating
Season	Episodes	First released	Last released	Rank	Rating
1	24	November 20, 1985	May 22, 1986	35	15.50
2	25	September 24, 1986	March 26, 1987	64	11.90

== Production and broadcast ==
Promotional cast photo from The Colbys

In early 1985, news outlets began reporting that ABC was developing a spin-off of Dynasty, then the #1 rated show in the US. Dynasty actors Rock Hudson, Ali MacGraw, Jack Coleman, Heather Locklear, and John James were mentioned as potential stars of the new series, tentatively titled The Colbys, and ABC was purportedly wooing Pamela Sue Martin to reprise her role as Fallon Carrington. It was also reported that Dynasty stars John Forsythe, Linda Evans, Joan Collins, and guest star Elizabeth Taylor would appear in the first two episodes of the spin-off, which would initially air after Dynasty on Wednesdays but would move to a time slot opposite Dallas on Fridays.

In March 1985, ABC announced that its rumored Dynasty spin-off had been greenlighted, to debut the following season. The Colbys would star John James as his Dynasty character Jeff Colby, with General Hospital actress Emma Samms as Fallon Carrington. The project was originally titled Dynasty II: The Colbys of California, which was shortened to Dynasty II: The Colbys and ultimately simplified to The Colbys. In May 1985, ABC unveiled its fall 1985 schedule, which placed The Colbys into the Thursday 9 pm time slot, preceded by The Fall Guy and followed by 20/20.

In June 1985, Dynasty co-creator Esther Shapiro approached Charlton Heston about the role of patriarch Jason Colby, the brother of Dynasty's Cecil Colby (Lloyd Bochner). Doris Day was considered, and both Burt Lancaster and Katharine Hepburn reportedly turned down roles in the series. In early July 1985, it was reported that in addition to Heston, ABC was pursuing Barbara Stanwyck and Faye Dunaway for starring roles, as well as James Coburn to play Ben Carrington, the brother of Dynasty's Blake Carrington (John Forsythe). On July 9, 1985, it was reported that The Colbys' versions of Dynasty rivals Krystle Carrington (Linda Evans) and Alexis Colby (Joan Collins) were going to be called Anthea (later changed to Francesca) and Sabella (nicknamed "Sable").

Heston's casting was confirmed in July 1985, as producers were negotiating with Angie Dickinson to play his character's wife. Ultimately, Dunaway, Dickinson, Elizabeth Ashley, and Diana Rigg all turned down the role of Jason's wife Sable. In August 1985, producers cast British actress Stephanie Beacham, "a household name" in the UK who had starred in the title role of the ITV drama Connie. Stanwyck and Maxwell Caulfield joined the cast in July 1985 as Jason's sister Constance and son Miles, with Stanwyck having a clause in her contract that she would not be required to do press interviews. That month, Elizabeth Taylor made a statement that she would not be appearing on Dynasty or The Colbys, then or in the future.

In August 1985, it was reported Heston would be paid $85,000 per episode (equivalent to $254,000 in 2025) and Stanwyck would be paid $75,000 (equivalent to $225,000 in 2025). The same month, Katharine Ross was cast as Francesca. In September 1985, it was reported that Ricardo Montalbán would appear as a "conniving shipping tycoon" described as "ambitious and scheming, but with a kind of charm that can allow him to get away with almost anything." The final cast included Tracy Scoggins and Claire Yarlett as Jason and Sable's daughters, Monica and Bliss Colby.

The 13 bedroom, 15,110-square-foot (1,404 m^{2})Jay Paley House in Holmby Hills (at the time owned by business magnate Barron Hilton) featured as the family palatial Bel Air mansion, The Belvedere. The 'masterpiece' gallery paintings in the mansion were painted by Lucia Vinograd. The attached stables were filmed at the Will Rogers State Historic Park.

The Colbys premiered at 10 pm on Wednesday, November 20, 1985, after Dynasty's eighth episode of the season, and was initially a ratings success. The next episode of The Colbys was scheduled to air the next night, Thursday, November 21, in the show's own new time slot, but was preempted by a televised speech by US President Ronald Reagan. It was later reported that Heston, an old friend of Reagan's, had phoned the President to request the speech be rescheduled, to no avail. Episode two aired on Wednesday, November 27, 1985, before Dynasty, and then The Colbys moved to its new night on Thursday, November 28, 1985.

Ratings for The Colbys dropped considerably in the new time slot, though a March 1986 episode featuring Jeff and Fallon's wedding garnered a high rating at a level not seen since the series' first two episodes. In January 1986, it was reported that Heston had extended his stay on The Colbys from 17 to 24 episodes, and Stanwyck ultimately extended from 13 to 24 episodes. ABC renewed The Colbys for a second season in March 1986, with Stanwyck stating she only wanted to appear in 6 or 7 episodes. The same month, Ron Miller of the Evening Independent suggested that The Colbys "appears to be so prohibitively expensive that future payoff in syndication seems very chancy."

In June 1986, it was reported that Stanwyck would not be returning for season two. She had purportedly complained for some time about her character's development, and in leaving suggested that Constance be killed. In July 1986, Kim Morgan Greene was cast as magazine reporter Channing Carter. In December 1986, it was reported that Heston had sent co-star Caulfield a letter admonishing him for unprofessional behavior on set, while calling the rest of The Colbys team "the best I've worked with in 30 years." ABC cancelled The Colbys after its second season.

== Ratings and criticism ==
The fifth season of Dynasty was ranked No. 1 in the Nielsen ratings in the United States. The Colbys debuted during Dynasty's sixth season, which saw Dynasty drop to 7th in the ratings. Although The Colbys garnered high ratings for its premiere episode and won a 1986 People's Choice Award for New Dramatic TV Program, the first season finished in 35th place, in part due to competition with NBC's Cheers and Night Court on Thursday nights. The Colbys was renewed for a second season but, scheduled opposite Cheers and Night Court—as well as a few weeks against rival soap Knots Landing on CBS -- The Colbys finished 64th for the year and was subsequently cancelled. Dynasty fell to No. 24 for its seventh season.

Like Dynasty, the series employed the standard melodrama of soap operas and added well-known performers and elaborate sets and wardrobe. Lee Margulies of the Los Angeles Times wrote, "It's not a spin-off, it's a clone—as close a replica as ABC and the Dynasty producers could concoct, right down to the credits." In their Directory To Primetime TV Shows, television historians Tim Brooks and Earle Marsh stated that the series likely failed because it was "too close a copy" of Dynasty. Barbara Holsopple of The Pittsburgh Press compared the scripts to Dick and Jane books for children, and criticized the acting.

When Stanwyck opted to end her contract and leave the series after its first season in 1986, she reportedly called the show "a turkey", and told co-creator Esther Shapiro "This is the biggest pile of garbage I ever did" and that "It's one thing to know you're making a lot of money off vulgarity, but when you don't know it's vulgar—it's plain stupid." Conversely, Heston always supported the show and stated its cancellation "was premature" as "we were coming closer to being a creative production team that could make the kind of show we'd planned on from the beginning." Dynasty star Joan Collins categorically refused to make any appearances in The Colbys herself, believing it would have caused "massive confusion between the two shows".

== Home media ==
On May 12, 2015, Shout! Factory released The Colbys: The Complete Series on DVD in Region 1 for the very first time. The 12-disc set features all 49 episodes of the series as well as all new cast interviews with Stephanie Beacham, John James and Maxwell Caulfield.

On July 20, 2015, The Colbys was released in Germany (Region 2). The DVD is split in two, the first season and the second season. The DVDs have a German cover (Die Colbys - Das Imperium) but are spoken in English and dubbed in German. The series has also been released on DVD in Spain in four volumes (two per season). In the UK, it was released as a single boxset of 12 discs (identical to the US release) by the DVD distributor MediumRare Entertainment in 2018.

The distribution rights to The Colbys, originally owned by Warner Bros. Domestic Television Distribution, transferred to CBS Paramount Network Television in 2006.
