= The Soap Opera Encyclopedia (Schemering book) =

- US first edition cover, featuring Kristian Alfonso and Peter Reckell of Days of Our Lives
- Author: Christopher Schemering
- Language: English
- Subject: Soap operas
- Publisher: Ballantine Books
- Publication date: September 1985
- Publication place: United States
- Media type: Print (paperback)
- Pages: 358
- ISBN: 0-345-32459-5

The Soap Opera Encyclopedia is a 1985 reference book by Christopher Schemering which assembles comprehensive information about all daytime and prime time soap operas broadcast up to the date of publication. It was revised and reprinted in 1987 and 1988, but is currently out of print.

The Soap Opera Encyclopedia features commentary, analysis and criticism of "every daytime and prime-time television soap opera broadcast on the three major networks, as well as a selection of syndicated, cable, and foreign efforts." It also discusses background, significant storylines and impact of each program, and lists performers and characters. Schemering also includes a "Short History of Television Soap Opera," as well as profiles of major performers, writers and producers in the genre in a section entitled "Who's Who in Soap Opera." Finally, the book contains 30 pages of photos from various programs.

Published in a time before the internet, the Encyclopedia was a primary source of background information and commentary on soap opera; it and Schemering have been quoted in various articles, books and web pages. It was revised and reprinted in 1987 (ISBN 0-345-35344-7) and 1988.

According to the Encyclopedia, Schemering "spent fifteen years collecting memorabilia and information about the soap opera phenomenon" and wrote a syndicated column on the genre. He was also a regular contributor to The Washington Post Book World and had published film and television articles in The New Republic, USA Today, the Chicago Tribune, the San Francisco Chronicle, the New York Daily News and other publications. Schemering is also the author of Guiding Light: A 50th Anniversary Celebration (1986).
