= Chris Gerolmo =

American singer-songwriter

- Born: United States
- Occupations: Film director, screenwriter, singer-songwriter

Chris Gerolmo is an American screenwriter, director, and singer-songwriter best known for writing the screenplays for the films Mississippi Burning and Miles from Home starring Richard Gere.

He has also written a book about the death of his wife, Joan, from cancer in 2007. This is titled Death for Beginners, published by Patcheny Press in 2011. He lives in Brentwood, California with his three children and stepson.

== Early life and education ==
He was born to Frank Gero (1929–2014), a former theater actor and stage manager who later became a producer, and Woji Gero who worked alongside her husband in the production business in the mid-1950s. He attended Harvard University in the early 1970s graduating with a BA in Writing & Film-making.

== Television work ==
In 1995 Gerolmo wrote and directed the made-for-TV movie Citizen X, about the Russian serial killer Andrei Chikatilo. Gerolmo's screenplay for Citizen X — based on the book The Killer Department by Robert Cullen – earned him an Emmy nomination, a Writers Guild of America Award, and an Edgar Award.

He also co-created with Steven Bochco the FX Networks military drama series Over There. He also wrote and performed the title song.

He was a consulting producer on The Bridge, an American police drama on the FX network, based on a 2011 police drama series co-produced in Denmark and Sweden.

== Filmography ==
- Above Suspicion (2019) (writer)
- The Bridge (2013) (TV Series) (producer: 12 episodes, writer: 1 episode)
- Certain Prey (2011) (TV Movie) (teleplay)
- Over There (2005) (TV Series) co-creator, writer: 2 episodes
- Citizen X (1995) (TV Movie) (teleplay)
- The Witness (1992) (TV Short)
- Mississippi Burning (1988) (writer)
- Miles from Home (1988) (writer)
