= Laura Bickford =

American film producer (born 1968)

Laura Conde Bickford (born September 30, 1968 in New York City, New York, USA) is an Academy Award nominated and Emmy Award nominated film and television producer who produced Traffic, Che, Duplicity, Arbitrage, and Beasts of No Nation. She was nominated for an Academy Award and BAFTA Award for Best Picture for Traffic in 2001 and an Emmy Award for Citizen X in 1996. She has been a member of Producers Branch of The Academy of Motion Picture Arts and Sciences since 2002. She is a member of the Producers Guild of America and was on the board of the writers and human rights organization PEN USA in Los Angeles from 2012-2018 until their merger with PEN America and is a current member of PEN's LA committee.

== Career ==
Bickford is a graduate of Sarah Lawrence College and began her career as a production assistant to Robert Altman in Paris on the 1987 film Beyond Therapy. Altman became a lifelong influence and friend. She consulted unaccredited on the financing for Altman's final film A Prairie Home Companion. After working with Altman, Bickford moved to London and went on to produce over fifty music videos, both in the US and in Europe for Vivid Productions.

She produced her first feature Citizen X for HBO Pictures in 1996. The film was written and directed by Chris Gerolmo with Stephen Rea, Donald Sutherland, and Max von Sydow. Bickford was nominated for the Emmy and Golden Globe and won the Cable Ace Award for best film made for television.

Bickford optioned the film rights to the British television mini series about the heroin trade in the UK & Pakistan and spent four years researching the war on drugs in the US, South America, and Mexico for a US adaptation. The film, Traffic, won four Academy Awards for Best Director for Steven Soderbergh, Best Supporting Actor for Benicio Del Toro, Best Original Screenplay, and Best Editing. The film was nominated for over 300 awards internationally and Del Toro also won the BAFTA Award, Golden Globe Award and Screen Actors Guild Award.

In the two-part epic Che, Bickford again worked with Soderbergh and Del Toro. Del Toro and Bickford worked with Terrence Malick on the script for Part 2 and spent years traveling around the world interviewing the last living members of the Cuban Revolution and researching the life of Che Guevara. The film was selected for competition at Cannes in 2008 and Del Toro won the Best Actor award.

Bickford produced El Yuma, directed by Del Toro and part of the omnibus 7 Days In Havana which was selected for Un Certain Regard at Cannes in 2012.

In 2012, she produced Arbitrage with Richard Gere which was the highest grossing day and date released film. In 2015, Bickford and Fiona Druckenmiller backed Cary Fukunaga’s film Beasts of No Nation that sold to Netflix and became their first theatrically launched film

== Personal life ==
Bickford is married to Stephen M. Graham who is a literature professor at Bard College, founder of New York Theater Workshop, and the son of the late Katharine Graham, publisher of The Washington Post. She was married to the actor Sam Bottoms, who died in 2008. She is the sister of Emily Bickford Lansbury and sister-in-law of George Lansbury.

Her mother, Jewelle Bickford, was an investment banker with the Rothschild Group from 1984 to 2008 in New York City. In 2000 she became the only female global partner at the firm. In 2020 she retired as partner at Evercore Wealth Management. She is a member of the Council on Foreign Relations and founded the task force on the role of women in economic and political development in the Middle East and Southeast Asia of the Council's Women and Foreign Policy. She is a member of C200, board member emeritus of Women for Women International and Women's Media Center, and a Co-founder, former Board President and a Co-chair Emeritus of Paradigm for Parity, a coalition of companies and business leaders committed to closing the corporate gender leadership gap for women of all races, cultures, and backgrounds.

Her father, Nathaniel Bickford, was a partner at the law firm Lankenau Kovner & Bickford for 25 years and then Windels Marx Laine & Mittendorf until he retired in 2002. He wrote the memoir Late Bloomer: A Memoir of School Days in 2008. In the 1970s, her father represented contemporary artists introduced to him by Bickford's godfather, Klaus Kertess, and traded art for fees most notably with Brice Marden, David Novros, Joanna Pousette-Dart, and Lynda Benglis.

She is a descendant of passengers from the Mayflower, Francis Cooke and Peter Browne, on both her maternal and paternal side.

== Filmography ==
- Citizen X (1995) (Executive Producer)
- Playing God (1997) (Producer)
- Bongwater (1997) (Producer)
- Traffic (2000) (Producer)
- Winter Passing (2005) (Executive Producer)
- Fur: An Imaginary Portrait of Diane Arbus (2006) (Producer)
- Chicago 10 (2007) (Executive Producer)
- Che: Part One (2008) (Producer)
- Che: Part Two (2008) (Producer)
- Duplicity (2009) (Producer)
- Arbitrage (2012) (Producer)
- 7 Days in Havana (2012) (Executive Producer - El Yuma segment)
- Beasts of No Nation (2015) (Executive Producer)
- Finding Altamira (2016) (Executive Producer)
- Sweetness in the Belly (2019) (Executive Producer)
- Ask E. Jean (2025) (Producer)
