= Kirpichny =

Kirpichny (Russian: Кирпичный; masculine), Kirpichnaya (Кирпичная; feminine), or Kirpichnoye (Кирпичное; neuter) is the name of several rural localities in Russia. The toponym derives from the Russian word "кирпич", meaning "brick".

== Modern localities ==
- Kirpichny, Altai Krai, a settlement in Verkh-Obsky Selsoviet of Smolensky District in Altai Krai; 52°25′N 85°2′E
- Kirpichny, Bryansk Oblast, a khutor in Gorodishchensky Rural Administrative Okrug of Pogarsky District in Bryansk Oblast; 52°30′N 33°14′E
- Kirpichny, Khanty-Mansi Autonomous Okrug, a settlement in Khanty-Mansiysky District of Khanty-Mansi Autonomous Okrug
- Kirpichny, Kostroma Oblast, a settlement in Yemsnenskoye Settlement of Nerekhtsky District in Kostroma Oblast; 57°20′N 40°50′E
- Kirpichny, Slavyansky District, Krasnodar Krai, a settlement in Prikubansky Rural Okrug of Slavyansky District in Krasnodar Krai; 45°14′N 38°2′E
- Kirpichny, Tikhoretsky District, Krasnodar Krai, a settlement in Alexeyevsky Rural Okrug of Tikhoretsky District in Krasnodar Krai; 45°47′N 40°9′E
- Kirpichny, Timashyovsky District, Krasnodar Krai, a settlement under the administrative jurisdiction of the Town of Timashyovsk in Timashyovsky District of Krasnodar Krai; 45°39′N 38°53′E
- Kirpichny, Kursk Oblast, a khutor in Banishchansky Selsoviet of Lgovsky District in Kursk Oblast
- Kirpichny, Mari El Republic, a settlement under the administrative jurisdiction of Krasnogorsky Urban-Type Settlement in Zvenigovsky District of the Mari El Republic
- Kirpichny, Oryol Oblast, a settlement in Dolbenkinsky Selsoviet of Dmitrovsky District in Oryol Oblast
- Kirpichny, Rostov Oblast, a khutor in Verkhnesolenovskoye Rural Settlement of Vesyolovsky District in Rostov Oblast
- Kirpichny, Sverdlovsk Oblast, a settlement under the administrative jurisdiction of the Town of Verkhnyaya Pyshma in Sverdlovsk Oblast
- Kirpichny, Volgograd Oblast, a khutor in Prigorodny Selsoviet of Frolovsky District in Volgograd Oblast
- Kirpichnoye, Krasnodar Krai, a selo in Georgiyevsky Rural Okrug of Tuapsinsky District in Krasnodar Krai; 44°10′N 39°12′E
- Kirpichnoye, Leningrad Oblast, a settlement in Krasnoselskoye Settlement Municipal Formation of Vyborgsky District in Leningrad Oblast; 60°28′N 29°22′E
- Kirpichnoye, Primorsky Krai, a village in Mikhaylovsky District of Primorsky Krai
- Kirpichnoye, Republic of Tatarstan, a selo in Nurlatsky District of the Republic of Tatarstan
- Kirpichnoye, Tomsk Oblast, a village in Chainsky District of Tomsk Oblast
- Kirpichnoye, Vologda Oblast, a settlement in Kamensky Selsoviet of Gryazovetsky District in Vologda Oblast

== Abolished localities ==
- Kirpichny, Khabarovsk Krai, a settlement in Okhotsky District of Khabarovsk Krai; abolished in October 2013

== Alternative names ==
- Kirpichnaya, alternative name of Kirpichnoye, a village in Mikhaylovsky District of Primorsky Krai
