= Vladimir Storozhenko =

Soviet serial killer

- Born: Vladimir Viktorovich Storozhenko; 11 April 1953; Smolensk, Smolensk Oblast, Russian SFSR, Soviet Union
- Died: 22 September 1982 (aged 29); Smolensk, Smolensk Oblast, Russian SFSR, Soviet Union
- Cause of death: Execution by shooting
- Other name: "The Smolensk Strangler"
- Conviction: Murder with aggravating circumstances
- Penalty: Death

Details
- Victims: 13
- Span of crimes: 1978–1981
- Country: Soviet Union
- State: Smolensk
- Date apprehended: 21 July 1981

Vladimir Viktorovich Storozhenko (Russian: Влади́мир Ви́кторович Стороже́нко; 11 April 1953 – 22 September 1982), known as The Smolensk Strangler (Russian: Смоленский душитель), was a Soviet serial killer.

== Biography ==
Storozhenko graduated from 8th grade of the 16th Smolensk High School. As a difficult teenager, he was known to police, as he engaged in petty theft, also torturing and killing domestic animals. He also showed heightened sexual interest and cruelty towards girls. Storozhenko was convicted twice, among his charges allegedly including rape. After his second release, he began work as a chauffeur at a car park. He married, and a son was born. Storozhenko had a reputation as an exemplary family man, and was characterized as a positive employee at work.

Between 1978 and 1981, there were about 20 attacks on women and girls in Smolensk and its environs, 13 of which resulted in murder involving rape. He committed the first murder in the historic part of the city, not far from the Assumption Cathedral. Storozhenko was not a strangler in the literal sense of the word, as he sadistically tortured and finished off victims in various ways; one of his victims was a 12-year-old student of the 31st Smolensk Secondary School, whose body was found in a sand pit with signs of torture. Once, the killer attacked a woman who turned out to be a decoy, a law enforcement officer, but Storozhenko was then frightened off by one of the policemen in the ambush. During the fight, he left traces of blood, as a result of which the criminal's blood type was established. It is also noteworthy that Storozhenko himself was a police informant and participated in the searches for the strangler.

Four innocent people were arrested for Storozhenko's crimes: the first was an employee of the prosecutor's office, and before his innocence was proven he spent 9 months in jail. After his release, he had to resign from the prosecutor's office and leave the city. The second, a traffic policeman, was arrested as an accomplice of the first. In the murder investigation of a woman in the recreation area of the Smolensk Aviation Plant, the authorities also accused a local guard who had previously been convicted of collaborationism during the Second World War and, under the pressure of investigators, had incriminated himself. Finally, authorities arrested a person for stealing who, under the threat of execution, was forced to confess to killing his wife and sentenced to 9 years imprisonment.

Storozhenko was arrested in 1981: the last victim survived and remembered a tattoo on his chest, and then identified him from the presented photo. Storozhenko was then questioned about his carpool travel sheets - their data matched up with the time and place of the crime. His blood type also coincided with the one found under the nails of the murdered women. Storozhenko's wife admitted that he had given her gold earrings that belonged to one of the victims. A gold ingot was found hidden in his apartment, under the bed of his paralyzed mother. Storozhenko's brother, Sergei, admitted that he knew about what his brother was doing, and said that the ingot is the melted decoration of his victims. He then indicated where other things were hidden. In addition, during the search, a cache of pistols and explosives was found: Sergei confessed that he and his brother had planned a series of attacks on state-owned enterprises on the days when they would issue wages there. When the last victim identified him in a police line-up, Vladimir Storozhenko began to confess. During the course of the investigation, an experiment was conducted: out of 30 female dummies, 13 had the clothes of his victims, in whose pockets were notes with the name of the victim, the time and place of the body's discovery. He managed to accurately indicate the clothing of his victims. The investigation into the Storozhenko case was conducted by the famous investigator Issa Kostoyev, who later led the Chikatilo case.

In 1983, the court upheld the death sentence by firing squad for Storozhenko, after which he was executed the following year. Sergei Storozhenko was convicted of criminal conspiracy and sentenced to 15 years imprisonment. While serving his sentence, he unsuccessfully tried to escape, and another 3 years were added to his sentence.

=== In the media ===
- Documentary film from the series The Investigation Led — Loop
- Documentary film from the series Legends of the Soviet Investigation — Devil's Puzzle

== See also ==
- List of Russian serial killers
- List of serial killers by number of victims
