= Citizen X =

1995 television film by Chris Gerolmo

- Promotional poster
- Genre: Biography; Crime; Drama
- Based on: The Killer Department by Robert Cullen
- Screenplay by: Chris Gerolmo
- Directed by: Chris Gerolmo
- Starring: Stephen Rea; Donald Sutherland; Max von Sydow; Jeffrey DeMunn; Joss Ackland; John Wood; Ion Caramitru; Imelda Staunton
- Music by: Randy Edelman
- Country of origin: United States
- Original language: English

Production
- Executive producers: Laura Bickford; Matthew Chapman; David R. Ginsburg
- Producer: Timothy Marx
- Cinematography: Robert Fraisse
- Editor: William Goldenberg
- Running time: 105 minutes
- Production companies: HBO Pictures; Citadel Entertainment

Original release
- Network: HBO
- Release: February 25, 1995

Citizen X is a 1995 American television film which covers the efforts of detectives in the Soviet Union to capture an unknown serial killer of women and children in the 1980s, and the bureaucratic obstacles they encounter. The film is based upon the true story of Soviet serial killer Andrei Chikatilo, who was convicted in 1992 of the murder of 52 women and children committed between 1978 and 1990. It stars Stephen Rea, Donald Sutherland, and Max Von Sydow. The film is based on Robert Cullen's non-fiction book The Killer Department, published in 1993. The film premiered on HBO on February 25, 1995.

== Plot ==
A body is discovered on a collective farm during harvesting in 1982. A subsequent search of adjacent woods, authorized by the new forensic specialist, Viktor Burakov, turns up seven more bodies in varying stages of decomposition. The film tells the story of the subsequent eight-year hunt by Burakov for the serial killer responsible for the mutilation and murder of 53 people, 52 of them below the age of 35. Burakov is promoted to detective and eventually aided, covertly at first, by Col. Mikhail Fetisov, his commanding officer and the shrewd head of the provincial committee for crime and much later, by Alexandr Bukhanovsky, a psychiatrist with a particular interest in what he calls "abnormal psychology".

As well as taking on the form of a crime thriller, the movie depicts Soviet propaganda and bureaucracy that contributed to the failure of law enforcement agencies to capture the killer, Andrei Chikatilo, for almost a decade. Chikatilo's crimes were not reported publicly for years. Local politicians were fearful such revelations would have a negative impact on the USSR's image, since serial killers were associated with "decadent, Western" moral corruption.

Chikatilo first comes under scrutiny early in the search when he is spotted at a station and found holding a satchel bag containing a knife. He is promptly arrested. However, he is shielded from investigation and released due to his membership in the Communist Party. Soviet crime labs erroneously report that his blood type did not match that found at the murders. All this changes under the political reforms of glasnost and Perestroika and the search for the killer begins to make progress.

With the passage of time and easing of political restrictions, Burakov devises a plan to blanket almost all the railroad stations, where the serial killer preys upon the young and unsuspecting, with conspicuous uniformed men to discourage the killer. Three small stations are left unattended, except for undercover agents. Chikatilo is eventually discovered and identified through the diligence of a local, plain-clothes soldier.

Arrested, Andrei Chikatilo is interrogated for seven consecutive days by Gorbunov, a Soviet hardliner who insists that he be the one to extract a confession. Chikatilo will not yield and under pressure from Fetisov and Burakov, Gorbunov agrees to another approach. Psychiatrist Bukhanovsky is introduced into the interview room. He recites from his lengthy analysis and speculation, made three years earlier, of the personality and tendencies of this sexually frustrated killer, whom he had entitled "Citizen X". Bukhanovsky eventually strikes a nerve and a weeping Chikatilo finally admits his guilt and answers specific questions about the details of some murders. Afterwards, Chikatilo leads law enforcement officials to the crime scenes and three undetected graves.

Held in a metal cage during his trial, a wild-eyed Chikatilo is convicted and sentenced to death. The film concludes with Chikatilo being led to a nameless prison chamber and shows him staring in shock at a central drain in the room's floor as a uniformed soldier delivers a pistol shot to the back of the killer's head.

== Cast ==
- Stephen Rea as Lieutenant / Colonel Viktor Burakov
- Donald Sutherland as Colonel / General Mikhail Fetisov
- Jeffrey DeMunn as Andrei Chikatilo
- Max von Sydow as Alexandr Bukhanovsky
- Joss Ackland as Bondarchuk
- John Wood as Gorbunov
- Ion Caramitru as Tatevsky
- Imelda Staunton as Ms. Burakova

== Production ==
=== Locations ===
The film was shot in Hungary. The station where Chikatilo picks his victims is the Hatvan railway station, northeast of Budapest. The smaller, arched train shelter scene was shot in Nagymaros, Gödöllő, and Szokolya. Several other scenes were shot in the Gödöllő Railway Station.

=== Director ===
The film was directed by Chris Gerolmo, who wrote the screenplay (adapted from Robert Cullen's 1993 non-fiction book The Killer Department) in addition to playing a minor role in the film as a militiaman.

=== Soundtrack ===
The score for Citizen X was composed and conducted by Randy Edelman. It has been released on CD in the US by Varèse Sarabande.

== Reception ==
=== Critical reception ===
Citizen X was met with positive reviews from critics and audiences. It earned an 86% score on the movie review aggregator site Rotten Tomatoes. Scott Weinberg of eFilmCritic.com described it as "Fascinating and absorbing. One of HBO's finest made-for-cable flicks."

=== Awards and nominations ===
Year	Award	Category	Nominee(s)	Result	Ref.
1995	CableACE Awards	Movie or Miniseries	Laura Bickford, Matthew Chapman, David R. Ginsburg, Timothy Marx, Webster Stone, and Robert Stone	Nominated	
1995	CableACE Awards	Supporting Actor in a Movie or Miniseries	Jeffrey DeMunn	Won	
1995	CableACE Awards	Supporting Actor in a Movie or Miniseries	Max von Sydow	Nominated	
1995	CableACE Awards	Directing a Movie or Miniseries	Chris Gerolmo	Nominated	
1995	CableACE Awards	Writing a Movie or Miniseries	Chris Gerolmo	Nominated	
1995	CableACE Awards	Cinematography in a Movie or Miniseries	Robert Fraisse	Nominated	
1995	Cairo International Film Festival	Best Actor	Stephen Rea	Won	
1995	Primetime Emmy Awards	Outstanding Made for Television Movie	Matthew Chapman, Laura Bickford, David R. Ginsburg, and Timothy Marx	Nominated	
1995	Primetime Emmy Awards	Outstanding Supporting Actor in a Miniseries or a Special	Jeffrey DeMunn	Nominated	
1995	Primetime Emmy Awards	Outstanding Supporting Actor in a Miniseries or a Special	Donald Sutherland	Won	
1995	Primetime Emmy Awards	Outstanding Individual Achievement in Directing for a Miniseries or a Special	Chris Gerolmo	Nominated	
1995	Primetime Emmy Awards	Outstanding Writing for a Miniseries or a Special	Chris Gerolmo	Nominated	
1995	Primetime Emmy Awards	Outstanding Individual Achievement in Casting	Joyce Nettles	Nominated	
1995	Primetime Emmy Awards	Outstanding Individual Achievement in Editing for a Miniseries or a Special – Single Camera Production	William Goldenberg	Nominated	
1995	Sitges Film Festival	Best Film	Chris Gerolmo	Won	
1995	Sitges Film Festival	Best Director	Chris Gerolmo	Won (Note: Tied with Michael Almereyda for Nadja.)	
1995	Sitges Film Festival	Best Actor	Stephen Rea	Won	
1996	Edgar Allan Poe Awards	Best Television Feature or Miniseries	Chris Gerolmo	Won	
1996	Golden Globe Awards	Best Miniseries or Motion Picture Made for Television		Nominated	
1996	Golden Globe Awards	Best Supporting Actor in a Series, Miniseries or Motion Picture Made for Television	Donald Sutherland	Won	
1996	Writers Guild of America Awards	Adapted Long Form	Chris Gerolmo; Based on the book The Killer Department by Robert Cullen	Won	

== Home media ==
Citizen X has been released on DVD in the US (HBO, region 1 NTSC), Germany (Cargo Records, region 2 PAL), Denmark (Scanbox, region 2 PAL) and the Netherlands (Paradiso Home Entertainment, region 2 PAL). The film received theatrical release in some territories and was exhibited in the widescreen 1.85:1 aspect ratio. Only the German DVD has a widescreen transfer; all others reflect the 1990s 1.33:1 TV aspect ratio, as originally broadcast.

== See also ==
- Child 44 (film)—Another film about the Andrei Chikatilo case
- Crime in the Soviet Union
