= The Witness (1992 film) =

1992 film by Chris Gerolmo

The Witness is a short film (19 minutes) directed by Chris Gerolmo, starring Gary Sinise and Elijah Wood.

== Plot ==
Set in a Nazi German concentration camp, The Witness shows a series of repeating set of psychological actions.

A camp guard's daily routine is to corral Jewish prisoners through a tunnel and into the gas chamber. Each day, as he performs this task, the guard is watched by a Jewish little boy, whose piercing stare unsettles him. He tries to shake this child's steady glare, day after day, until one night he steals into the barracks, finds the child and smothers him. Instead of being free of the accusing stare, another child has replaced the one he killed.

The Witness was produced in 1992 in the United States and is in the German language.

== Cast ==
- Gary Sinise as Young Soldier
- Elijah Wood as Little Boy
- Ryan Alosio as Lt. Hummel
- Aaron Freeman as Another Kid
- Jono Gero as Paperwork Soldier #2
- Gregory Martin as Machine Gun Soldier #1
- John Sudol as Machine Gun Soldier #2
- Tim DeZarn as Paperwork Soldier #1 (as Tim De Zarn)

== Home media ==
This film was one of four on a DVD released in Australia by the MRA Entertainment Group as Perverse Destiny, Vol 3.

== See also ==
- List of Holocaust films
