= Park of Aviators =

Park in Rostov-on-Don, Russia

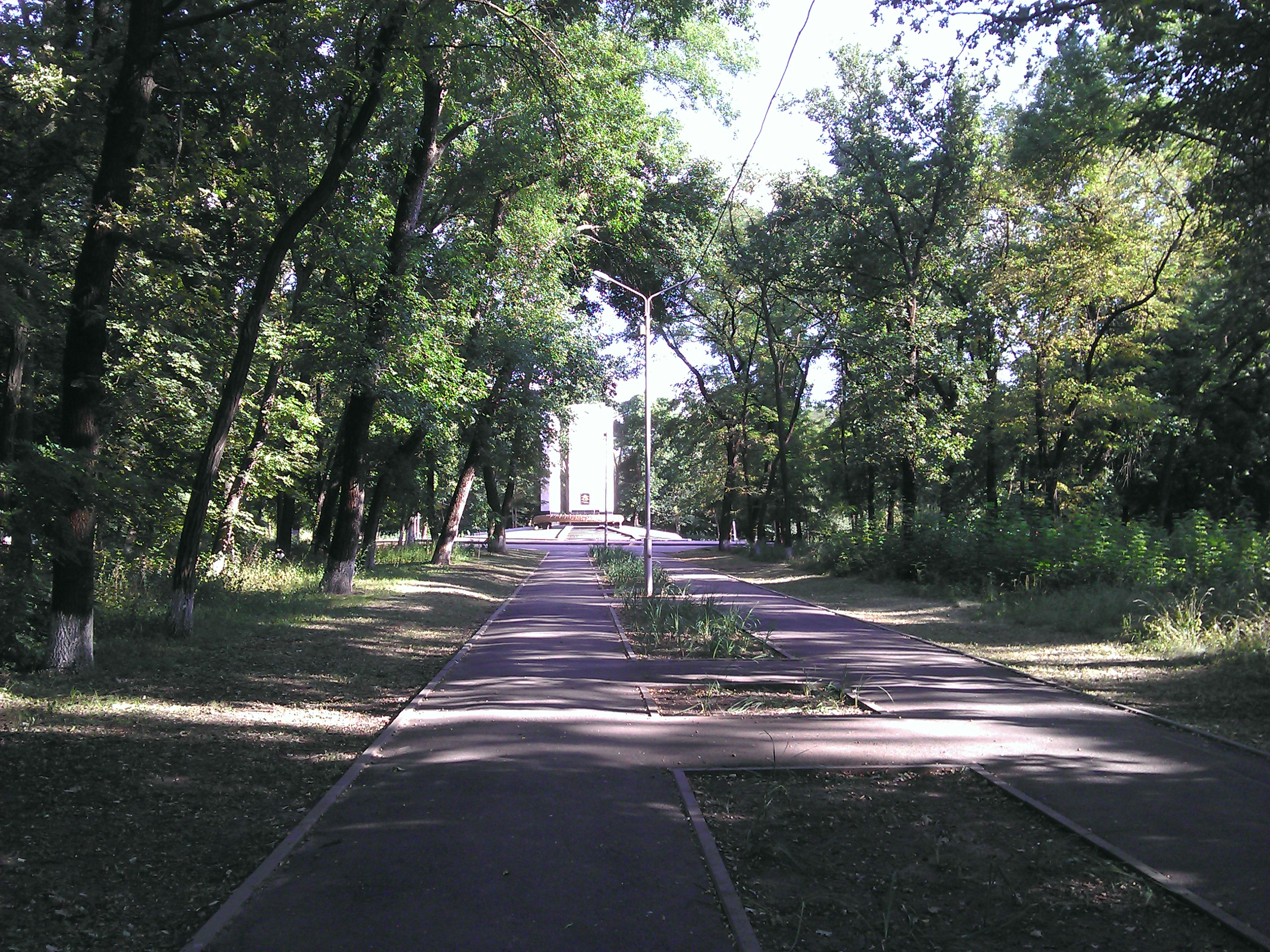
Park entrance, 2015

Park of Aviators (Russian: Парк Авиаторов) is an urban forest located within the Pervomaysky District of Rostov-on-Don, along the Prospect of Sholokhov. On a number of occasions from 1983 to 1985, the mutilated bodies of victims of the serial killer Andrei Chikatilo were discovered within the park, where some—if not all—had been killed.

== History ==
During the Soviet period, numerous events including sport-related activities were regularly held in the Park of Aviators. Then an asphalt road which remained in a bad condition till the 21st century was paved here. In 2013, territory within the park was partly covered in asphalt, and numerous benches and garbage bins were set with intentions of recreational convenience. At weekends, the park is attended by an average of 1,000 people. Volunteers are known to plant fruit trees, lime-trees, maples and birches. Currently, there are no lavatories or comprehensive lighting facilities within the territory of the Park of Aviators.

In 2015, approximately 6,5 million rubles were allocated to reconstruction of the work of the memorial to the "Defenders of Rostov-on-Don's Sky" (Russian: мемориал "Защитникам ростовского неба") which is set in the Park of Aviators. In 2016, the Development Authority of the Pervomaysky District of Rostov-on-Don announced the start of the auction upon the choice of a contractor to commence the specified scope of work. The expectations of this renovation were that all required renovation would be conducted over all the objects within the memorial, including a stele, an obelisk and three pylons located within the park. It was planned to coat walls with granite, remove old plaster and install both illumination and a sufficient lighting system.

In May 2016, intentions to construct a bicycle park within the Park of Aviators were announced, as a general necessity to construct an environ for a cycling infrastructure within the park were deemed an attraction and suitability for family vacations in addition to being a general convenience to the public.

As of 2017, investors were actively being searched to renovate the Park of Aviators. On 1 April 2017, an ecological marathon was organized within the Park of Aviators, with the desired goal of this initiative being to both clear area of general garbage, and to plant new trees within the park.
