= Miles from Home (1988 film) =

1988 film by Gary Sinise

- Theatrical release poster
- Directed by: Gary Sinise
- Written by: Chris Gerolmo
- Produced by: Fred Zollo; Paul Kurta; Randy Finch; Russ Smith
- Starring: Richard Gere; Kevin Anderson
- Cinematography: Elliot Davis
- Edited by: Jane Schwartz Jaffe
- Music by: Robert Folk
- Distributed by: Cinecom Pictures
- Release dates: May 18, 1988 (Cannes); September 16, 1988 (United States)
- Running time: 108 minutes
- Country: United States
- Language: English
- Box office: $188,964

Miles from Home is a 1988 American action thriller film starring Richard Gere and Kevin Anderson. It is about two brothers who, after being forced off their farm in the debt stricken Midwestern United States, become folk heroes when they begin robbing the banks that have been foreclosing on farmers. The movie was directed by Gary Sinise and written by Chris Gerolmo. The film uses many members of Chicago's Steppenwolf Theatre Company of which Sinise is a co-founder.

The film was filmed entirely on location throughout the state of Iowa, including Worthington, Iowa and Cedar Rapids, Iowa. It was entered into the 1988 Cannes Film Festival.

== Plot ==
The Roberts family farm in Iowa is a prosperous one. Frank Roberts, Sr. and his two young sons are even visited there by Nikita Khrushchev during the Soviet Union premier's tour of the Midwestern United States in 1959.

The farmland worked on by three-generations of Roberts' used to be top-notch, but costs have steadily risen while crop prices have barely budged, so many farmers have been failing. A deluge of rain has ruined the crops. They must resort to desperate measures, they sell practically all their personal belongings in a yard sale, just to pay their bills. Anger in Frank Jr. builds when the bank forecloses, until he ultimately suggests to younger brother Terry that they set fire to the farm, rather than let the bank seize control of it.

As the brothers take to the road, becoming thieves, the story of their action at home strikes a chord with neighbors and strangers who offer them shelter or even a hideout when the law's in pursuit. Along the way, the Roberts brothers encounter a wide variety of people. Terry meets, and falls for, his soulmate, Sally (Penelope Ann Miller); a stripper introduces them to Maxwell, a reporter who wants to tell their story before the law catches up with them.

Cocky Frank decides they go to a local fair. He's power-drunk on the press, literally drunk and loud when they start the ox pull competition. When he sees the struggling ox, he tries to stop the driver, then puts the animal out of its misery. The police are alerted, but they run. The next day, Frank leaves Terry sleeping in the car goes in to rob the bank, but Terry stops him and they escape.

That afternoon they find work with a fellow corn harvester, but they are spotted and get the cops on their tail. Finally Terry, with the help of Sally's lawyer father, decides to stay, and Frank drives off in the distance.

== Cast ==
- Richard Gere as Frank Roberts, Jr.
- Kevin Anderson as Terry Roberts
- Penelope Ann Miller as Sally
- Helen Hunt as Jennifer
- Terry Kinney as Mark
- Brian Dennehy as Frank Roberts, Sr.
- Laurie Metcalf as Exotic Dancer
- Francis Guinan as Tommy Malin
- Judith Ivey as Frances
- Dennis Blome as Sheriff
- John Malkovich as Barry Maxwell
- Yancy Taylor as Kid at Fair (uncredited)
- Laura San Giacomo as Sandy (uncredited)
- Larry Poling as Nikita Khrushchev
- Moira Harris as Frank's Girl (uncredited)
- Dick Stout as Random Fair Goer (uncredited)

== Release ==
The film premiered at the 1988 Cannes Film Festival on May 18, 1988. It was re-edited heavily after its Cannes debut. It was a gala presentation at the 1988 Toronto International Film Festival on September 12, 1988 and opened in the United States and Canada on September 16.

== Reception ==
=== Box office ===
The film gained a limited release, and grossed about $188,000.

=== Critical reception ===
The movie received mixed-to-positive reviews from critics. On Rotten Tomatoes, the film holds a 60% "Fresh" rating based on 5 reviews. According to film historian Leonard Maltin, "Gere's actions, and his performance, are so off-putting that you wonder if he doesn't deserve his fate...which can hardly be the point."
