= Timothy Marx =

American television and film producer

- Born: United States
- Occupations: Film producer, television producer

Timothy Marx is an American television and film producer. His credits include productions with Sam Shepard, Neil Simon, Al Pacino, Penn & Teller, Garry Trudeau, Arthur Penn, and Bill Moyers.

== Early career ==
Early in his career Marx was a producer for the PBS series American Playhouse, where he produced 8 independent movies or miniseries, including the Sundance grand prize winner Smooth Talk (associate producer), Sam Shepard's True West with John Malkovich and Gary Sinise (line producer), Pete Gurney's The Dining Room, the mini-series Roanoak, Isaac Bashevis Singer's The Cafeteria, Carol Bly's Rachel River, and Richard Nelson's Sensibility and Sense.

== Film and television productions ==
Marx produced the hit CBS series Young Sheldon for Chuck Lorre and Warner Bros television. In its first three seasons it was CBS' top rated comedy. In previous series television he produced the HBO series Entourage and executive produced and directed the comedy Arliss. He also produced Baby Daddy, The Nine Lives of Chloe King for ABC Family, Invasion for ABC, Justice and Likely Suspects for Fox and the pilot episodes of Enlightened (HBO), The Captain (CBS) and Related (ABC), among others. Marx also produced the HBO movie Citizen X which won the CableAce award for Best Picture and received PGA Best Picture, 7 Emmy, and 2 Golden Globe nominations. His comedy feature film credits include Passed Away, Penn & Teller Get Killed, Martin Lawrence: You So Crazy and the television comedy specials Garry Trudeau's Rap Master Ronnie and Penn & Teller's Invisible Thread. Other credits include Al Pacino's independent project The Local Stigmatic, Richard Benjamin's TNT version of Neil Simon's The Goodbye Girl and Deep Red, the premiere movie for the FX channel.

== Non-fiction production ==
In non-fiction, Marx directed and produced Bluetopia: The LA Dodgers Movie, which portrayed the unique bond the team has with the ethnically diverse population of Los Angeles. Marx produced the IMAX movie for the US World's Fair Pavilion in Knoxville, Tennessee and numerous documentaries, including the American Masters portrait of Helen Hayes. He has worked on political campaign journals with Bill Moyers and numerous presidential and senatorial candidates.

== Affiliations ==
Marx is an adjunct professor at USC School of Cinematic Arts.

== Personal life ==
Timothy Marx lives in Los Angeles with his wife Nan Simons Marx and their two children Sophie and Benjamin.

== Filmography ==
=== Series and television movies ===
- Baby Daddy - ABC Family
- Bunheads – ABC Family
- The Nine Lives of Chloe King – ABC Family
- The Wedding Band – TBS
- Enlightened – HBO
- RPM – TNT
- The Captain – CBS
- Justice – Fox
- Invasion – ABC
- Related – WB
- Expeditions to the Edge – NatGeo
- Entourage – HBO
- The Goodbye Girl –TNT
- Better Days – ABC
- Arli$$ – HBO
- Come on Get Happy – ABC
- Likely Suspects – Fox
- Radiant City – ABC
- Two Mothers – ABC
- Citizen X – HBO
- Gemini Man – ABC
- Haunting of Sea Cliff Inn – USA
- Deep Red – USA
- Precious Victims – CBS
- Those Secrets – ABC
- Helen Hayes – American Masters
- Sensibility & Sense – American Playhouse
- Deadline – Fox
- Steel Magnolias – CBS
- Rise & Rise of Daniel Rocket – American Playhouse
- Roanoak – American Playhouse
- True West – American Playhouse

=== Feature films ===
- Bluetopia: The LA Dodgers Movie
- Martin Lawrence: You So Crazy – Goldwyn
- Passed Away – Hollywood Pictures
- The Local Stigmatic – Independent Dir: Al Pacino
- Penn & Teller Get Killed – Warner Bros. Dir: Arthur Penn
- Rachel River – American Playhouse
- Smooth Talk – American Playhouse
- Grand Prize, Sundance Film Festival

=== Comedy specials ===
- Reno in Rage & Rehab – HBO
- Garry Trudeau's Rap master Ronnie – HBO
- Penn & Teller's Invisible Thread – Showtime
