= Andrei Chikatilo =

Soviet serial killer (1936–1994)

- Андрей Чикатило
- Mugshot of Chikatilo, taken after his arrest in November 1990
- Born: 16 October 1936; Yabluchne [uk], Sumy Oblast, Ukrainian SSR, Soviet Union
- Died: 14 February 1994 (aged 57); Novocherkassk, Rostov Oblast, Russia
- Other names: The Butcher of Rostov; The Forest Strip Killer; The Red Ripper; The Rostov Ripper
- Spouse: Feodosia Odnacheva (m. 1963; div. 1992)
- Children: 2
- Status: Executed by shooting
- Motive: Sexual sadism; Rage
- Convictions: Murder with aggravating circumstances (52 counts); Sexual abuse Sexual assault
- Penalty: Death

Details
- Victims: 52 convicted 53 tried 56+ claimed
- Span of crimes: 22 December 1978 – 6 November 1990
- Country: Soviet Union
- Date apprehended: 20 November 1990

Andrei Romanovich Chikatilo (Russian: Андрей Романович Чикатило; Ukrainian: Андрій Романович Чикатило, romanized: Andrii Romanovych Chykatylo; 16 October 1936 – 14 February 1994) was a Ukrainian-born Soviet serial killer nicknamed "the Butcher of Rostov", "the Rostov Ripper", and "the Red Ripper" who sexually assaulted, murdered, and mutilated at least fifty-two women and children between 1978 and 1990 in the Russian SFSR, the Ukrainian SSR, and the Uzbek SSR.

Chikatilo confessed to fifty-six murders; he was tried for fifty-three murders in April 1992. He was convicted and sentenced to death for fifty-two of these murders in October 1992, although the Supreme Court of Russia ruled in 1993 that insufficient evidence existed to prove his guilt in nine of those killings. Chikatilo was executed by gunshot in February 1994.

Chikatilo was known as "the Rostov Ripper" and "the Butcher of Rostov" because he committed most of his murders in the Rostov Oblast of the Russian SFSR.

== Early life ==
=== Childhood ===
Andrei Chikatilo (Note: Chikatilo's first name is also transliterated as Andrey.) was born on 16 October 1936 in the village of Yabluchne [uk] in the Sumy Oblast of the Ukrainian SSR. At the time of his birth, Ukraine was recovering from a severe famine caused by Joseph Stalin's forced collectivization of agriculture. Chikatilo's parents were collective farm labourers who lived in a one-room hut, receiving no wages for their work, but instead having the right to cultivate a plot of land behind the family hut.

The family rarely had sufficient food; Chikatilo later claimed not to have eaten bread until the age of 12, adding that he and his family often had to eat grass and leaves to stave off hunger. Throughout his childhood, Chikatilo was repeatedly told by his mother Anna that prior to his birth, an older brother of his named Stepan had, at the age of four, been kidnapped and cannibalized by starving neighbours. However, it has never been established whether this incident actually occurred, or if a Stepan Chikatilo even existed. Chikatilo recalled his childhood as being blighted by poverty, ridicule, hunger, and war.

When the Soviet Union entered the Second World War, Chikatilo's father, Roman, was conscripted into the Red Army. He would later be taken prisoner after being wounded in combat. Between 1941 and 1944, Chikatilo witnessed some of the effects of the Nazi occupation of Ukraine, which he described as "horrors", adding he witnessed bombings, fires, and shootings from which he and his mother would hide in cellars and ditches. On one occasion, Chikatilo and his mother were forced to watch their own hut burn to the ground. With his father at war, Chikatilo shared a single bed with his mother. He was a chronic bed wetter, and his mother berated and beat him for each offence.

In 1943, Chikatilo's mother gave birth to a baby girl, Tatyana. Because Chikatilo's father had been conscripted in 1941, he could not have fathered this child. As many Ukrainian women were raped by German soldiers during the war, it has been speculated Tatyana was conceived as a result of such a rape. With Chikatilo and his mother living together in a one-room hut, this rape also may have been committed in Chikatilo's presence.

In September 1944, Chikatilo began his schooling. Although shy and ardently studious as a child, he was physically weak and regularly attended school in homespun clothing, his stomach often swollen from hunger resulting from the post-war famine which plagued much of the Soviet Union. On several occasions, this hunger caused Chikatilo to faint both at home and school, and he was consistently targeted by bullies who mocked him over his physical stature and timid nature. At home, Chikatilo and his sister were constantly berated by their mother. Tatyana later recalled that despite the hardships endured by her parents, their father was a kind and caring man, whereas their mother was harsh and unforgiving toward her children.

Chikatilo developed a passion for reading and memorizing data. He often studied at home, to increase his sense of self-worth and to compensate for his myopia, which often prevented him from reading the classroom blackboard. To his teachers, Chikatilo was an excellent student upon whom they would regularly bestow praise and commendation.

=== Adolescence ===
By his teens, Chikatilo was both a model student and an ardent communist. He was appointed editor of his school newspaper at age 14 and chairman of the pupils' Communist Party committee two years later. An avid reader of communist literature, he was also delegated the task of organizing street marches. Although Chikatilo claimed learning did not come easy to him due to headaches and poor memory, he was the only student from his collective farm to complete the final year of study, graduating with excellent grades in 1954.

At the onset of puberty, Chikatilo discovered that he had chronic impotence, worsening his social awkwardness and self-hatred. He was shy in the company of women; his first crush, at age 17, had been on a girl named Lilya Barysheva, with whom he had become acquainted through his school newspaper, yet he was chronically nervous in her company and never asked her for a date. The same year, Chikatilo jumped upon an 11-year-old friend of his younger sister and wrestled her to the ground, ejaculating as the girl struggled in his grasp.

Following his graduation, Chikatilo applied for a scholarship at Moscow State University. Although he passed the entrance examination with good-to-excellent scores, his grades were not deemed good enough for acceptance. Chikatilo speculated his scholarship application was rejected due to his father's tainted war record (his father had been branded a traitor for being taken prisoner in 1943) but the truth was that other students had performed better in a highly competitive exam. He did not attempt to enrol at another university; instead, he travelled to Kursk, where he worked as a labourer for three months before—in 1955—enrolling in a vocational school to become a communications technician. The same year, Chikatilo formed his first serious relationship, with a local girl two years his junior. On three occasions, the couple attempted intercourse, but on each occasion, he was unable to sustain an erection. After eighteen months, she broke off the relationship.

=== Army service ===
Upon completion of his two-year vocational training, Chikatilo relocated to the Urals city of Nizhny Tagil to work upon a long-term construction project. While living in Nizhny Tagil, he also undertook correspondence courses in engineering with the Moscow Electrotechnical Institute of Communication. He worked in the Urals for two years until he was drafted into the Soviet Army in 1957. Chikatilo performed his compulsory military service between 1957 and 1960, assigned first to serve with border guards in Central Asia, then to a KGB communications unit in East Berlin. Here, his work record was unblemished, and he joined the Communist Party shortly before his military service ended in 1960.

Upon completing his service, Chikatilo returned to his native village to live with his parents, briefly working alongside them on the collective farm. He soon became acquainted with a young divorcée. Their three-month relationship ended after several unsuccessful attempts at intercourse, after which the woman innocently asked her friends for advice as to how Chikatilo might overcome his inability to maintain an erection. As a result, most of his peers discovered his impotence. In a 1993 interview regarding this incident, Chikatilo stated: "Girls were going behind my back, whispering that I was impotent. I was so ashamed. I tried to hang myself. My mother and some young neighbours pulled me out of the noose. Well, I thought no one would want such a shamed man. So I had to run away from there, away from my homeland."

== Move to Rostov-on-Don ==
After several months, Chikatilo found a job as a communications engineer in the town of Rodionovo-Nesvetayskaya, twenty miles north of Rostov-on-Don. He relocated to the Russian SFSR in 1961, renting a small apartment close to his workplace. The same year, his younger sister, Tatyana, finished her schooling and moved into his apartment (his parents relocated to the Rostov region shortly thereafter). Tatyana lived with her brother for six months before marrying a local youth and moving into her in-laws' home; she noted nothing untoward with regard to her brother's life beyond his chronic shyness around women, and resolved to help her brother find a wife and start a family.

=== Marriage ===
In 1963, Chikatilo married a woman named Feodosia Odnacheva, to whom he had been introduced by his younger sister. According to Chikatilo, although he was attracted to Feodosia, his marriage was effectively an arranged one which occurred barely two weeks after they had met and in which the decisive roles were played by his sister and her husband. Chikatilo later claimed that his marital sex life was minimal and that, after his wife understood he was unable to maintain an erection, they agreed she would conceive by him ejaculating externally and pushing his semen inside her vagina with his fingers. In 1965, Feodosia gave birth to a daughter, Lyudmila. Four years later, in 1969, a son named Yuri was born.

== Teaching career ==
Chikatilo chose to enrol as a correspondence student at Rostov University in 1964, studying Russian literature and philology; he obtained his degree in these subjects in 1970. Shortly before obtaining his degree, he obtained a job managing regional sports activities. Chikatilo remained in this position for one year before beginning his career as a teacher of Russian language and literature at Vocational School No. 32 in Novoshakhtinsk.

Chikatilo was largely ineffective as a teacher; although knowledgeable in the subjects he taught, he was seldom able to maintain discipline in his classes and was regularly subjected to mockery by his students who, he claimed, took advantage of his modest nature.

One of Chikatilo's duties at this school was ensuring the students who boarded at the school were present in their dormitories in the evenings; on several occasions, he is known to have entered the girls' dormitory in the hope of seeing them undressed. On other occasions, he discovered adolescent pupils who boarded at the school engaged in sex. He later stated the sight of adolescents engaged in intercourse "disturbed" him as he was confronted with the sight of "children doing what I hadn't done even when I was thirty years old."

=== Sexual assaults ===
In May 1973, Chikatilo committed his first known sexual assault upon one of his pupils. In this incident, he swam towards a 15-year-old girl and groped her breasts and genitals, ejaculating as the girl struggled against his grasp. Months later, Chikatilo sexually assaulted and beat another teenage girl whom he had locked in his classroom. (Note: When discussing the circumstances immediately preceding this second incident of molestation in 1993, Chikatilo recounted: "She was an older girl, in the senior class. Her name was Ultseva, I think. She was already developed and everything. She had breasts and all ... something started to gnaw at me. This was what I hadn't had: a youth, a childhood, and there she was, sitting like that with her legs open. Well, I spanked her on the legs, on the rear end, and on her breasts. Then I locked her in the classroom.") He was not disciplined for either of these incidents, nor for the occasions in which fellow teachers observed Chikatilo fondling himself in the presence of his students.

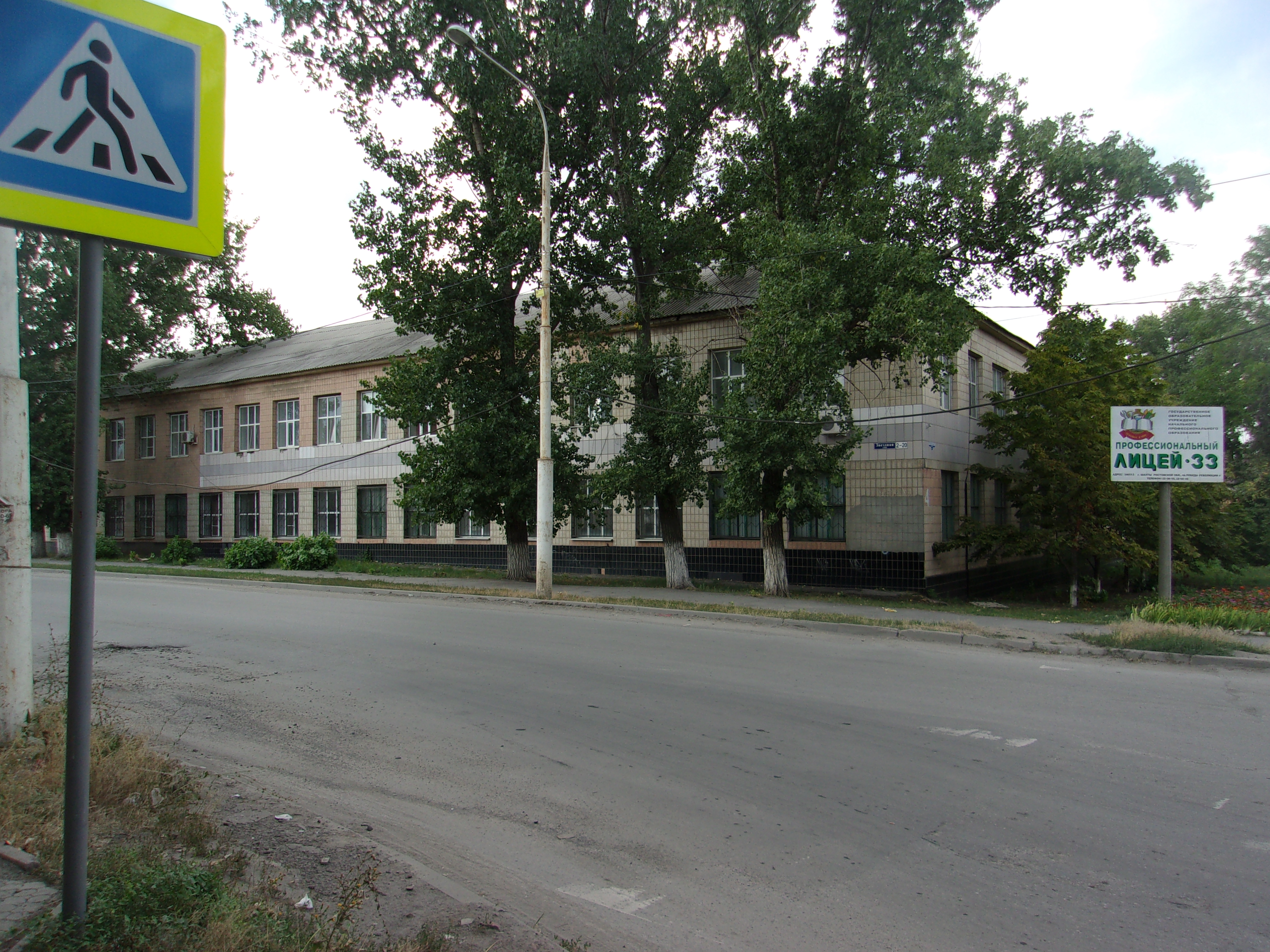
Technical School No. 33, Shakhty. Chikatilo worked at this school at the time of his first murder.

In response to the increasing number of complaints lodged against him by pupils, the director of the school summoned Chikatilo to a formal meeting and informed him he should either resign voluntarily or be fired. Chikatilo left his employment discreetly and found another job as a teacher at another school in Novoshakhtinsk in January 1974. He lost this job as a result of staff cutbacks in September 1978, before finding another teaching position at Technical School No. 33 in Shakhty, a coal-mining town forty-seven miles north of Rostov.

By Chikatilo's admission, by the mid-1970s, his desire to view naked children drove him to loiter around public toilets, where he frequently spied on young girls. He also purchased chewing gum which he gave to female children he encountered to initiate contact and gain their trust. Chikatilo is known to have sexually assaulted at least three girls whom he encountered via this method.

Chikatilo's career as a teacher ended in March 1981 following several complaints of child molestation against pupils of both sexes. The same month, he began a job as a supply clerk for a factory based in Rostov which produced construction materials. This job required him to travel extensively across much of the Soviet Union either to physically purchase the raw materials required to fulfil production quotas, or to negotiate supply contracts.

== Initial murders ==
=== Murder of Yelena Zakotnova ===
In September 1978, Chikatilo moved to Shakhty, where he committed his first documented murder. On the evening of 22 December, he lured a 9-year-old girl named Yelena Zakotnova to an old, dilapidated hut which he had secretly purchased that year; he attempted to rape her but failed to achieve an erection. When the girl struggled, he choked her and stabbed her three times in the abdomen, ejaculating while stabbing the child. In an interview after his 1990 arrest, Chikatilo later recalled that immediately after he stabbed Zakotnova, the girl had "said something very hoarsely", whereupon he strangled her into unconsciousness before throwing her body into the nearby Grushevka River. Zakotnova's body was found beneath a nearby bridge two days later. (Note: Chikatilo ostensibly purchased this hut as a retirement home for his ageing father, although he soon began using the residence as a location to instead bring young female vagrants he typically encountered at Shakhty's train station for sexual encounters. Due to his impotence, he typically offered to perform oral sex on these women.)

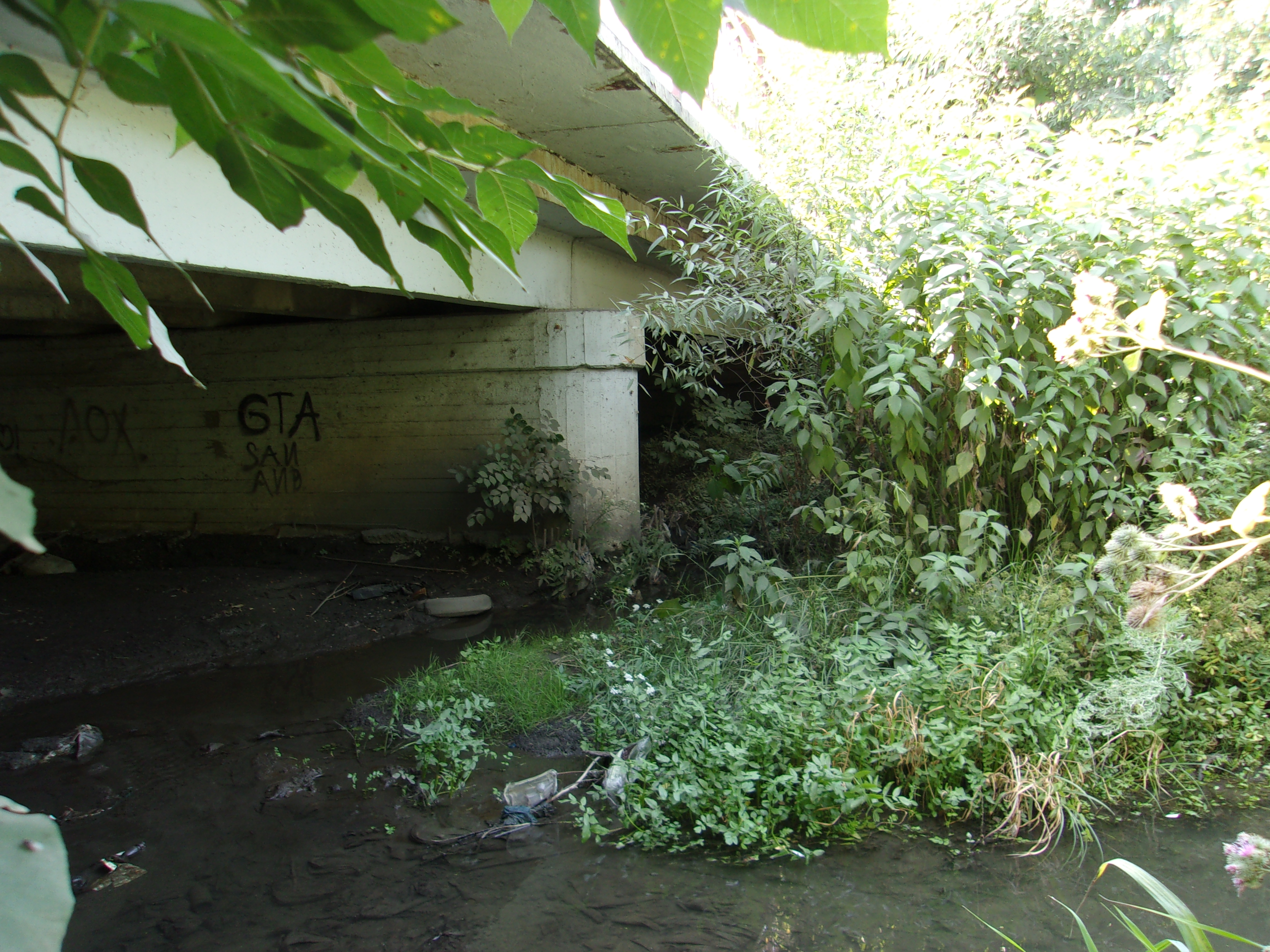
Bridge overlooking the Grushevka River; the body of Yelena Zakotnova was found at this location on 24 December 1978.

Numerous pieces of evidence linked Chikatilo to Zakotnova's murder: spots of blood had been found in the snow close to a fence facing the house Chikatilo had purchased; neighbours had noted that Chikatilo had been present in the house on the evening of 22 December; Zakotnova's school backpack had been found upon the opposite bank of the river at the end of the street (indicating the girl had been thrown into the river at this location); and a witness had given police a detailed description of a man closely resembling Chikatilo, whom she had seen talking with Zakotnova at the bus stop where the girl had last been seen alive. Despite these facts, a 25-year-old labourer named Aleksandr Kravchenko, who had previously served a prison sentence for the 1970 rape and murder of a young girl, was arrested for the crime. A search of Kravchenko's home revealed spots of blood on his wife's jumper: the blood type was determined to match both Zakotnova and Kravchenko's wife.

Kravchenko had a very strong alibi for the afternoon of 22 December: he had been at home with his wife and a friend of hers the entire afternoon, and neighbours of the couple were able to verify this. Nonetheless, the police, having threatened Kravchenko's wife with being an accomplice to murder and her friend with perjury, obtained new statements in which the women claimed Kravchenko had not returned home until late in the evening on the day of the murder. Confronted with these altered testimonies, Kravchenko confessed to the killing. He was tried for the murder in 1979. At his trial, Kravchenko retracted his confession and maintained his innocence, stating his confession had been obtained under extreme duress. Despite his retraction, Kravchenko was convicted of the murder and sentenced to death. This sentence was commuted to fifteen years' imprisonment (the maximum possible length of imprisonment at the time) by the Supreme Court in December 1980. Under pressure from the victim's relatives, Kravchenko was retried, erroneously convicted, and eventually executed by firing squad for Zakotnova's murder in July 1983.

Following Zakotnova's murder, Chikatilo was able to achieve sexual arousal and orgasm only through stabbing and slashing women and children to death, and he later claimed that the urge to relive the experience had overwhelmed him. Nonetheless, Chikatilo did stress that, initially, he had struggled to resist these urges, often cutting short business trips to return home rather than face the temptation to search for a victim.

=== Second murder and subsequent killings ===
On 3 September 1981, Chikatilo encountered a 17-year-old boarding school student, Larisa Tkachenko, standing at a bus stop as he exited a public library in Rostov city centre. According to his subsequent confession, Chikatilo lured Tkachenko to a forest near the Don River with the pretext of drinking vodka and "relaxing". When they reached a secluded area, he threw the girl to the ground before tearing off her clothes and attempting intercourse, as Tkachenko remonstrated against his actions. When Chikatilo failed to achieve an erection, he forced mud inside her mouth to stifle her screams before battering and strangling her to death. As he had no knife, Chikatilo mutilated the body with his teeth and a six-foot-long stick; he also tore one nipple from Tkachenko's body with his teeth before loosely covering her body with leaves, branches, and torn pages of newspaper. Tkachenko's body was found the following day.

Nine months after the murder of Tkachenko, on 12 June 1982, Chikatilo travelled by bus to the Bagayevsky District of Rostov to purchase vegetables. Having to change buses in the village of Donskoi, he decided to continue his journey on foot. Walking away from the bus station, he encountered a 13-year-old girl, Lyubov Biryuk, who was walking home from a shopping trip. The two walked together for approximately a quarter of a mile until their path was shielded from the view of potential witnesses by bushes, whereupon Chikatilo pounced upon Biryuk, dragged her into nearby undergrowth, tore off her dress, and killed her by stabbing and slashing her to death as he imitated performing intercourse. When her body was found on 27 June, the medical examiner discovered evidence of twenty-two knife wounds inflicted to the head, neck, chest, and pelvic region. Further wounds found on the skull suggested the killer had attacked Biryuk from behind with the handle and blade of his knife. In addition, several striations were discovered upon Biryuk's eye sockets.

Following Biryuk's murder, Chikatilo no longer attempted to resist his homicidal urges: between July and September 1982, he killed a further five victims between the ages of 9 and 18. He established a pattern of approaching children, runaways, and young vagrants at bus or railway stations, enticing them to a nearby forest or other secluded area, and killing them, usually by stabbing, slashing and eviscerating the victim with a knife; although some victims, in addition to receiving a multitude of knife wounds, were also strangled or battered to death.

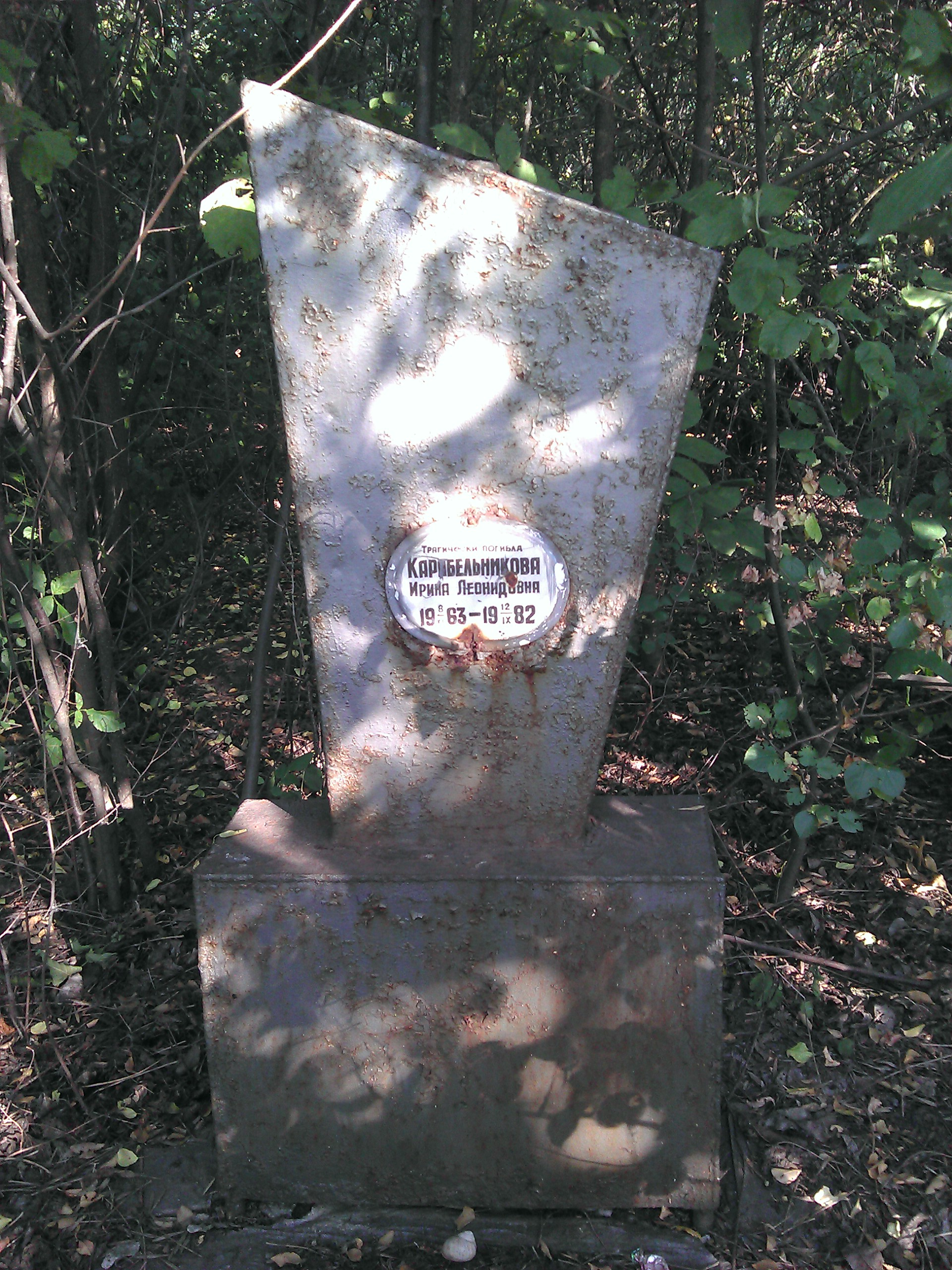
Memorial to Chikatilo's seventh victim, Irina Karabelnikova. This memorial was erected by Karabelnikova's father at the site of her murder.

Many of the victims' bodies bore evidence of mutilation to the eye sockets. Pathologists concluded these injuries had been caused by a knife, leading investigators to the conclusion the killer had gouged out the eyes of his victims. Chikatilo's adult female victims were often prostitutes or homeless women whom he would lure to secluded areas with promises of alcohol or money. He would typically attempt intercourse with these victims, but he would usually be unable to achieve or maintain an erection; this would send him into a murderous fury, particularly if the woman mocked his impotence. He would achieve orgasm only when he stabbed and slashed the victim to death. Chikatilo's child and adolescent victims were of both sexes; he would lure these victims to secluded areas using a variety of ruses, usually formed in the initial conversation with the victim, such as promising them assistance, company or offering to show them a shortcut, a bus stop, a chance to view rare stamps, films or coins, or with an offer of food or candy. He would usually overpower these victims once they were alone, often tying their hands behind their backs with a length of rope before stuffing mud or loam into the victims' mouths to silence their screams, and then proceed to kill them. After the killing, Chikatilo would make rudimentary—though seldom serious—efforts to conceal the body before leaving the crime scene.

On 11 December 1982, Chikatilo encountered a 10-year-old girl named Olga Stalmachenok riding a bus to her parents' home in Novoshakhtinsk and persuaded the child to leave the bus with him. She was last seen by a fellow passenger, who reported that a middle-aged man had led the girl away firmly by the hand. Chikatilo lured the girl to a cornfield on the outskirts of the city, stabbed her in excess of fifty times around the head and body, ripped open her chest and excised her lower bowel and uterus.

=== Investigation ===
By January 1983, four victims thus far killed had been tentatively linked to the same killer. A Moscow police team, headed by Major Mikhail Fetisov, was sent to Rostov to direct the investigation, which gradually became known among investigators as Operation Forest Path. Fetisov established a team of ten investigators based in Rostov, charged with solving all four cases. In March, Fetisov assigned a newly appointed forensic analyst, Viktor Burakov, to head the investigation. The following month, Stalmachenok's body was found. Burakov was summoned to the crime scene, where he examined the numerous knife wounds and eviscerations conducted upon the child and the striations on her eye sockets. Burakov later stated that, as he noted the striations upon Stalmachenok's eye sockets, any doubts about the presence of a serial killer evaporated.

Chikatilo did not kill again until June 1983, when he murdered a 15-year-old Armenian girl named Laura Sarkisyan; her body was found in woodland close to an unmarked railway platform near Novocherkassk. By September, he had killed a further five victims. The accumulation of bodies found and the similarities between the pattern of wounds inflicted on the victims forced the Soviet authorities to acknowledge that a serial killer was on the loose. On 6 September 1983, the public prosecutor of the Soviet Union formally linked six of the murders thus far attributed to the same killer. (Note: The six murder victims attributed to the manhunt for Chikatilo on this date were Biryuk, Kuprina, Karabelnikova, Stalmachenok, Dunenkova and Gudkov.)

Due to the sheer savagery of the murders and the precision of the eviscerations upon the victims' bodies, police theorized that the killings had been conducted by either a group harvesting organs to sell for transplant, the work of a Satanic cult, or a mentally ill individual. Much of the police effort concentrated upon the theory that the killer must be mentally ill, homosexual, or a paedophile, and the alibis of all individuals who had either spent time in psychiatric wards or had been convicted of homosexuality or paedophilia were checked and logged in a card filing system. Registered sex offenders were also investigated and, if their alibi was corroborated, eliminated from the inquiry.

Beginning in September 1983, several young men confessed to the murders, although these individuals were commonly intellectually disabled youths who admitted to the crimes only under prolonged and often brutal interrogation. Three known homosexuals and a convicted sex offender committed suicide as a result of the investigators' heavy-handed tactics. As a result of the investigation, more than 1,000 unrelated crimes, including ninety-five murders, 140 aggravated assaults and 245 rapes, were solved.

As police obtained confessions from suspects, bodies continued to be discovered, proving that the suspects who had confessed could not be the killer they were seeking. On 30 October 1983, the eviscerated body of a 19-year-old prostitute, Vera Shevkun, was found in Shakhty. Shevkun had been killed on 27 October. Although the mutilations inflicted upon her body were otherwise characteristic of those found upon other victims linked to the unknown murderer, the victim's eyes had not been enucleated or otherwise wounded. Two months later, on 27 December, a 14-year-old Gukovo schoolboy, Sergey Markov, was lured off a train and murdered at a rural station near Novocherkassk. Markov was emasculated and suffered over seventy knife wounds to his neck and upper torso before being eviscerated.

=== 1984 ===
Composite drawing of the man seen with Dmitry Ptashnikov on the evening of the boy's murder.

In January and February 1984, Chikatilo killed two women in Rostov's Park of Aviators. On 24 March, he lured a 10-year-old boy, Dmitry Ptashnikov, away from a stamp kiosk in Novoshakhtinsk. While walking with the boy, Chikatilo was seen by several witnesses who were able to give investigators a detailed description of the killer. When Ptashnikov's body was found three days later, police also found a footprint of the killer and both semen and saliva samples on the victim's clothing. On 25 May, Chikatilo killed a young woman named Tatyana Petrosyan and her 10-year-old daughter, Svetlana, in a wooded area outside Shakhty; Petrosyan had known Chikatilo for several years prior to her murder. By the end of July, he had killed three additional young women between the ages of 19 and 21, and a 13-year-old boy.

In the summer of 1984, Chikatilo was fired from his work as a supply clerk for the theft of two rolls of linoleum. The accusation had been filed against him the previous February, and he had been asked to resign quietly but had refused to do so, as he had denied the charges. Chikatilo found another job as a supply clerk in Rostov on 1 August.

On 2 August, Chikatilo killed a 16-year-old girl, Natalya Golosovskaya, in the Park of Aviators. On 7 August, he lured a 17-year-old girl, Lyudmila Alekseyeva, to the banks of the Don River on the pretence of showing her a shortcut to a bus terminal. Alekseyeva suffered thirty-nine slash wounds to her body before Chikatilo mutilated and disembowelled her, intentionally inflicting wounds he knew would not be immediately fatal. Her body was found the following morning; her excised upper lip inside her mouth.

Hours after Alekseyeva's murder, Chikatilo flew to the Uzbek capital of Tashkent on a business trip to purchase electrical switches. By the time he returned to Rostov on 15 August, he had killed an unidentified young woman and a 10-year-old girl, Akmaral Seydaliyeva. Within two weeks, the nude body of an 11-year-old boy named Aleksandr Chepel was discovered on the banks of the Don River, strangled and castrated, with his eyes gouged out, just yards from where Alexeyeva's body had earlier been found and on 6 September, Chikatilo killed a young librarian, 24-year-old Irina Luchinskaya, in the Park of Aviators.

== First arrest and release ==
On 13 September 1984, Chikatilo was observed by two undercover detectives attempting to talk to young women at a Rostov bus station. The detectives followed him as he wandered through the city, trying to approach women and committing acts of frotteurism in public places. Upon Chikatilo's arrival at the city's central market he was arrested and held. A search of his belongings revealed a knife with a 20-centimetre (7.9 in) blade, several lengths of rope, and a jar of Vaseline. He was also discovered to be under investigation for minor theft at one of his former employers, which gave the investigators the legal right to hold him for a prolonged period of time. Chikatilo's dubious background was uncovered, and his physical description matched the description of the man seen walking alongside Dmitry Ptashnikov prior to the boy's murder. A sample of Chikatilo's blood was taken, the results of which revealed his blood group to be type A, whereas semen samples found upon a total of six victims murdered by the unknown killer throughout the spring and summer of 1984 had been classified by medical examiners as being type AB. Chikatilo's name was added to the card index file used by investigators; however, the results of his blood type analysis largely discounted him as being the unknown killer. (Note: By Chikatilo's arrest, this index file had expanded to include over 25,000 individuals investigated in connection with the murders.)

Chikatilo was found guilty of theft of property from his previous employer. His membership of the Communist Party was revoked and he was sentenced to one year in prison. He was released from custody on 12 December 1984 after serving three months. On 8 October 1984, the head of the Russian Public Prosecutors Office formally linked twenty-three of Chikatilo's murders into one case and dropped all charges against the mentally disabled youths who had previously confessed to the murders.

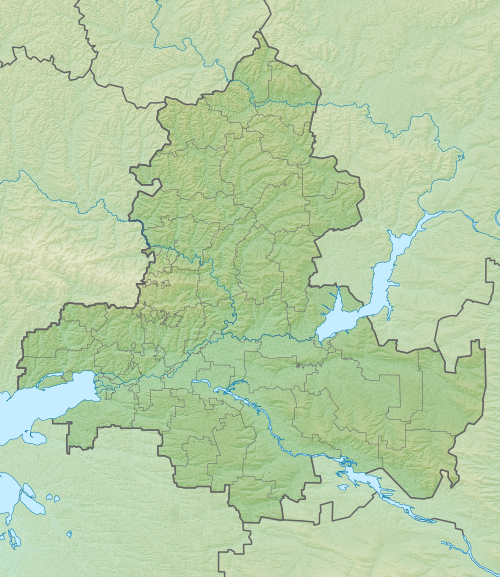
Geographical locations within the Rostov Oblast where several victims linked to the manhunt had been murdered by 1985. Almost all locations where victims were found were close to the oblast's mass transport hubs—particularly the rail network. The blue circle indicates the location of the Park of Aviators.

=== Further murders ===
Upon his release from prison in December 1984, Chikatilo found new work within the supply department of a locomotive factory in Novocherkassk and kept a low profile. He did not kill again until 1 August 1985 when, on a business trip to Moscow, he encountered an 18-year-old woman, named Natalia Pokhlistova, standing on a railway platform near Domodedovo Airport. Pokhlistova was lured off a train into a thicket of woods close to the village of Vostryakovo where she was bound, stabbed thirty-eight times in her neck and chest, then strangled to death. Her body was discovered two days later.

Based upon the hypothesis that the killer had travelled from the Rostov Oblast to Moscow via air, and that only a finite number of commuters travelled between Rostov and Moscow by air, investigators checked all Aeroflot flight records of passengers who had commuted between Moscow and the Rostov region between late July and early August. However, due to Pokhlistova's murder coinciding with Moscow hosting the 12th World Festival of Youth and Students, Chikatilo had travelled to Moscow by train and, accordingly, no travel documentation existed for investigators to research. Four weeks later, on 27 August, Chikatilo killed another young woman, Irina Gulyaeva, in Shakhty. As had been the case with Pokhlistova, the wounds inflicted upon the victim linked her murder to the hunt for the serial killer.

In November 1985, a special procurator, Issa Kostoyev, was appointed to supervise the investigation, which had by this stage expanded to include fifteen procurators and twenty-nine detectives assigned to work exclusively upon the manhunt. The known murders linked to the manhunt were carefully re-investigated, and police began another round of questioning of known sex offenders and homosexuals. The following month, the militsiya resumed the patrolling of railway stations around Rostov, and plain clothed female officers were ordered to loiter around bus and train stations.

At the request of Burakov, police also took the step of consulting a psychiatrist, Dr. Alexandr Bukhanovsky, the first such consultation in a serial killer investigation in the Soviet Union. All crime scene and medical examiner's reports were made available to Bukhanovsky, upon the understanding he would produce a psychological profile of the unknown murderer for investigators.

== Psychological profile ==
Bukhanovsky's 65-page psychological profile described the killer as a reclusive man aged between 45 and 50 years who had endured a painful and isolated childhood, and who was incapable of flirting or courtship with women. This individual was well educated, likely to be married to a woman with whom he may have fathered children but who expected little or no sexual intimacy from him, yet also a sadist who suffered from impotence and could achieve sexual arousal and release only by seeing his victims suffer. The murders themselves were an analogue to the sexual intercourse this individual was incapable of performing, and his knife became a substitute for a penis which failed to function normally.

Because many of the killings had occurred on weekdays near mass transport hubs and across the entire Rostov Oblast, Bukhanovsky also argued that the killer's work required him to travel regularly, and based upon the actual days of the week when the majority of the killings had occurred, the killer was most likely tied to a production schedule.

Chikatilo followed the investigation carefully, reading newspaper reports about the ongoing manhunt which had begun to appear in the press and keeping his homicidal urges under control. For almost a year following the August 1985 murder of Gulyaeva, no further victims were found in either the Rostov or Moscow Oblasts whose bodies bore the signature mutilations of the unknown murderer. Investigators did tentatively link the murder of a 33-year-old woman named Lyubov Golovakha—found stabbed to death in the Myasnikovsky District of Rostov on 23 July 1986—to the investigation, although this was solely upon the basis that the killer's semen type matched that of the killer they were seeking, that the victim had been stripped naked prior to her murder, and that she had been stabbed in excess of twenty times. The victim had not been dismembered or otherwise mutilated, nor had she been seen near mass transportation. Because of these discrepancies, many investigators expressed serious doubts as to whether Golovakha's murder had been committed by the killer they were seeking.

=== Investigative theories ===
On 18 August 1986, a victim was found buried in a depression of earth in the grounds of a collective farm in the city of Bataysk. The wounds inflicted on this victim bore the trademark mutilations of victims linked to the manhunt killed between 1982 and 1985. The victim was an 18-year-old court secretary named Irina Pogoryelova. Her body had been slit open from the neck to the genitalia, with one breast removed and her eyes cut out. As the murderer had made serious efforts to bury the body, some investigators theorized that this explained the sudden dearth in the number of victims found.

As the victims killed in the Rostov Oblast in 1985 and 1986 had died in the months of July and August, by the autumn of 1986, some investigators gave credence to the possibility that the perpetrator had relocated to another part of the Soviet Union and was returning to the Rostov Oblast only in summer. The Rostov police compiled bulletins to be sent to all forces throughout the Soviet Union, describing the pattern of wounds their unknown killer inflicted upon his victims and requesting feedback from any police force who had discovered murder victims with wounds matching those upon the victims found in the Rostov Oblast. The response was negative. (Note: Uzbek investigators did not link the two murders committed by Chikatilo in Tashkent to the series because in one instance, the victim had been beheaded, and in the second instance, the mutilations upon the victim had been so extensive police had concluded the body had been caught in a harvesting machine.)

=== 1987 ===
In 1987, Chikatilo killed three times. On each occasion, the murder took place while he was on a business trip far away from the Rostov Oblast, and none of these murders were linked to the manhunt in Rostov. Chikatilo's first murder in 1987 was committed on 16 May, when he encountered a 12-year-old boy, Oleg Makarenkov, at a train station in the Urals town of Revda. Makarenkov was lured from the station with the promise of sharing a meal with Chikatilo at his dacha; he was murdered in woodland close to the station, although his body remained undiscovered until 1991. In July, he killed a 12-year-old boy, Ivan Bilovetsky, in the Ukrainian city of Zaporizhia, and on 15 September, he killed a 16-year-old vocational school student, Yuri Tereshonok, in woodland on the outskirts of Leningrad.

== Definitive resurfacing ==
In 1988, Chikatilo killed three times, murdering an unidentified woman in Krasny Sulin in April and two boys in May and July. His first murder victim was lured off a train at Krasny Sulin before Chikatilo bound her hands behind her back and stuffed her mouth with dirt, before severing her nose from her face and inflicting numerous knife wounds to her neck. Chikatilo then bludgeoned her to death with a slab of concrete; her body was found on 6 April. Investigators noted that the knife wounds inflicted upon this victim were similar to those inflicted on the victims linked to the manhunt and killed between 1982 and 1985, but as the woman had been killed with a slab of concrete, had not been disembowelled, and her murderer had not wounded her eyes or genitals, investigators were unsure whether to link this murder to the investigation. In May, Chikatilo killed a 9-year-old boy named Aleksey Voronko in the Ukrainian city of Ilovaisk. The boy's wounds left no doubt the killer had struck again, and this murder was linked to the manhunt. On 14 July, Chikatilo killed 15-year-old Yevgeny Muratov at Donleskhoz station near Shakhty. Muratov's murder was also linked to the investigation, although his body was not found until April 1989. Although his remains were largely skeletal, Muratov's autopsy revealed he had been emasculated and had suffered at least thirty knife wounds.

Chikatilo did not kill again until 28 February 1989, when he killed a 16-year-old girl, Tatyana Ryzhova, in his daughter's vacant apartment. (Note: Chikatilo's daughter, Lyudmila, had vacated this apartment in 1988 following her marriage to a man living in Kharkiv. Chikatilo and his wife continued paying the rent for this apartment with the expectation their son, Yuri, would occupy the apartment following the completion of his military service.) He dismembered her body and hid the remains in a nearby sewer. As the victim had been dismembered, police did not link her murder to the investigation. Between May and August, Chikatilo killed a further four victims, three of whom were killed in Rostov and Shakhty, although only two of these victims were linked to the manhunt.

With the resurfacing of victims definitively linked to the manhunt and the fact the majority of these victims' bodies had been discovered close to railway stations, investigators assigned numerous plainclothed officers to discreetly film and photograph passengers on trains throughout the Rostov Oblast. Several trains were also fitted with hidden cameras with the intention of filming or photographing a victim in the company of his or her murderer.

On 14 January 1990, Chikatilo encountered 11-year-old Andrei Kravchenko standing outside a Shakhty theatre. Kravchenko was lured from the theatre on the pretext of being shown imported Western films Chikatilo claimed to have at his residence; his extensively stabbed, emasculated body was found in a secluded section of woodland the following month. Seven weeks after Kravchenko's murder, on 7 March, Chikatilo lured a 10-year-old boy, Yaroslav Makarov, from a Rostov train station to Rostov's Botanical Gardens. His eviscerated body was found the following day.

=== Political and public pressure ===
On 11 March, the leaders of the investigation, headed by Fetisov, held a meeting to discuss progress made in the manhunt. Fetisov was under intense pressure from the public, the press, and the Soviet Ministry of the Interior to solve the case; both he and Viktor Burakov had devoted extensive time and effort over the previous seven years in their efforts to apprehend the perpetrator. (Note: In 1986, Burakov would be hospitalized for three weeks with nervous stress and exhaustion brought upon him by the pressure of the manhunt for the murderer. Following Chikatilo's arrest, he would liken the manhunt to being a nightmare, adding that for years, his head "constantly ached" and that, whenever he was upon or near mass transport, he would ponder whether any adult male in his proximity was the perpetrator.) The intensity of the manhunt in the years up to 1984 had receded to a degree between 1985 and 1987, when Chikatilo had committed only three murders investigators had conclusively linked to the killer—all killed by 1986. By March 1990, a further six victims had been linked to the killer. In addition, following the introduction of greater media freedom as a result of glasnost, the Soviet news media was much less repressed than it had been in the early years of the manhunt and accordingly devoted extensive publicity to the case. Fetisov had also noted laxity in some areas of the investigation and warned that people would be fired if the killer was not caught soon.

Chikatilo had killed three further victims by August 1990. On 4 April, he lured a 31-year-old woman, Lyubov Zuyeva, off a train and killed her in woodland near Donleskhoz station. Her body was not found until 24 August. On 28 July, he lured a 13-year-old boy, Viktor Petrov, away from a Rostov railway station and killed him in Rostov's Botanical Gardens; and on 14 August, he killed an 11-year-old boy, Ivan Fomin, in the reeds near Novocherkassk beach.

== Snare ==
The discovery of more victims sparked a massive police operation. Because several victims' bodies had been discovered at railway stations on one rail route through the Rostov Oblast, Burakov suggested a plan to saturate all larger stations in the region with an obvious uniformed police presence which the killer could not fail to notice. The intention was to discourage the killer from attempting to strike at any of these locations and to have undercover agents patrol smaller and less busy stations, where the murderer's activities would be more likely to be noticed. The plan was approved, and both the uniformed and undercover officers were instructed to question any adult man in the company of a young woman or child, and note his name and passport number. Police deployed 360 men at all the stations in the Rostov Oblast, but only undercover officers were posted at the three smallest stations on the route through the oblast where the killer had struck most frequently—Kundryucha, Donleskhoz, and Lesostep—to force the killer to strike at one of those three stations. The operation was implemented on 27 October 1990.

On 30 October, police found the body of a 16-year-old boy, Vadim Gromov, at Donleskhoz station. The wounds upon Gromov's body immediately linked his murder to the manhunt: the youth had been strangled, stabbed twenty-seven times and castrated, with the tip of his tongue severed and his left eye stabbed. Gromov had been killed on 17 October, ten days before the start of the initiative. The same day Gromov's body was found, Chikatilo lured another 16-year-old boy, Viktor Tishchenko, off a train at Kirpichnaya station and killed him in a nearby forest. Tishchenko's castrated body—bearing forty knife wounds—was found on 3 November.

=== Final murder ===
On 6 November 1990, Chikatilo killed and mutilated a 22-year-old woman, Svetlana Korostik, in woodland near Donleskhoz station. Returning to the railway platform, he was noticed by an undercover officer named Igor Rybakov, who observed Chikatilo approach a well and wash his hands and face. When he approached the station, Rybakov also noted that Chikatilo's coat had grass and soil stains on the elbows; Chikatilo also had a small red smear on his cheek and what appeared to be a severe wound on one of his fingers. To Rybakov, he looked suspicious. The only reason people entered the woodland near Donleskhoz station at that time of year was to gather wild mushrooms (a popular pastime in Russia), but Chikatilo was not dressed like a typical forest scavenger; he was wearing more formal attire. He had a nylon sports bag, which was unsuitable for carrying mushrooms. Rybakov stopped Chikatilo and checked his papers, but had no formal reason to arrest him. When Rybakov returned to his office, he filed a routine report, containing the name of the person he had stopped at the station and the possible blood smear observed upon his cheek.

On 13 November, Korostik's body was found; she was the thirty-eighth victim linked to the manhunt. Police summoned the officer in charge of surveillance at Donleskhoz station and examined the reports of all men stopped and questioned in the previous week. Not only was Chikatilo's name among those reports, but it was familiar to several officers involved in the case because he had been questioned in 1984 and had been placed upon a 1987 suspect list compiled and distributed throughout the Soviet Union. After checking with Chikatilo's present and previous employers, investigators were able to place him in various towns and cities at times when several victims linked to the investigation had been murdered. Questioning of former colleagues from Chikatilo's teaching days revealed that he had been forced to resign from two teaching positions due to repeated complaints of lewd behaviour and sexual assault made by his pupils.

== Surveillance and second arrest ==
Police placed Chikatilo under surveillance on 14 November 1990. In several instances, particularly on trains or buses, he was observed approaching lone young women or children and engaging them in conversation. If the woman or child broke off the conversation, Chikatilo would wait a few minutes and then seek another conversation partner. On 20 November, after six days of surveillance, Chikatilo left his house with a large jar, which he had filled with beer at a small kiosk in a local park before he wandered around Novocherkassk, attempting to make contact with children he met on his way. Upon exiting a cafe, Chikatilo was arrested by four plainclothes police officers. He offered no resistance as he was handcuffed and placed inside an unmarked police car.

Upon his arrest, Chikatilo gave a statement claiming that the police were mistaken and complained that he had also been arrested in 1984 for the same murders. A strip-search of the suspect revealed a further piece of evidence: the middle finger of Chikatilo's right hand had a deep flesh wound he had self-treated with iodine. Medical examiners concluded the wound was from a human bite. Chikatilo's penultimate victim, Viktor Tishchenko, was a physically strong youth. At the crime scene, the police found numerous signs of a ferocious physical struggle between the victim and his murderer. Although a finger bone was later found to be broken and his fingernail had been bitten off, Chikatilo had never sought medical treatment for this injury.

A search of Chikatilo's belongings revealed he was in possession of a folding knife and two lengths of rope. A sample of his blood was taken, and he was placed in a cell inside the KGB headquarters in Rostov with a police informer, who was instructed to engage Chikatilo in conversation and elicit any information he could from him. The next day, 21 November, formal questioning of Chikatilo began. The interrogation was performed by Issa Kostoyev. The strategy chosen by the police to elicit a confession was to lead Chikatilo to believe that he was a very sick individual in need of medical help. The intention was to give Chikatilo hope that if he confessed, he would not be prosecuted by reason of insanity. Police knew their case against Chikatilo was largely circumstantial, and under Soviet law, they had ten days in which they could legally hold a suspect before either charging or releasing him.

=== Blood group analysis ===
On 21 November, the results of Chikatilo's blood test again revealed his blood type to be type A and not type AB. Due to the amount of physical and circumstantial evidence investigators had thus far compiled, which indicated Chikatilo was indeed the murderer, plus the fact that investigators had deduced the blood type of the murderer they had pursued using semen samples obtained from the clothing and bodies of fourteen of the victims as opposed to actual blood samples, investigators obtained a sample of Chikatilo's semen to test his blood type, the results of which confirmed that Chikatilo's semen was type AB, whereas his blood and saliva were type A. (Note: Investigators had received a circular in 1988 indicating that in extremely rare cases, a man's blood type may differ from his semen and saliva type. A serology expert named Svetlana Gurtovaya would later state at Chikatilo's trial he was an example of this "extremely rare phenomenon" she termed "paradoxical secretion." These findings were openly dismissed by experts in serology and DNA analysis, one of whom stated the most likely reason for Dr. Gurtovaya's conclusion in Chikatilo's case was systemic flaws in Soviet laboratory work regarding laboratory reagents which accurately determined an individual's blood type, but created a false B reading in type A semen.)

Throughout the questioning, Chikatilo repeatedly denied that he had committed the murders, although he did confess to molesting several of his pupils during his career as a teacher. He also produced several written essays for Kostoyev which, although evasive regarding the actual murders, did reveal psychological symptoms consistent with those predicted by Dr. Bukhanovsky in the 1985 profile he had written for the investigators. The interrogation tactics used by Kostoyev may also have caused Chikatilo to become defensive; the informer sharing a KGB cell with the suspect reported to police that Chikatilo had informed him that Kostoyev had repeatedly asked him direct questions regarding the mutilations inflicted upon the victims.

== Confession ==
On 29 November, at the request of Burakov and Fetisov, Dr. Bukhanovsky was invited to assist in the questioning of the suspect. Bukhanovsky read extracts from his 65-page psychological profile to Chikatilo. Within two hours, Chikatilo burst into tears and confessed to Bukhanovsky that he was indeed guilty of the crimes for which he had been arrested. After conversing into the evening, Bukhanovsky reported to Burakov and Fetisov that Chikatilo was ready to confess. (Note: In 1993, Chikatilo would recount his initial encounter with Dr. Bukhanovsky by stating: "He already knew me ... and when he recounted everything about my life—how people had humiliated me, shot at me and trampled on me from infancy—well, it was bitter of course. I cried in front of him. I said 'How do you know all this?' ... All my life, I had never had a friend ... no one. There was no one close to me. He is the person closest to me, even now. I cried in front of him and told him everything. I held back nothing.")

Armed with the handwritten notes Bukhanovsky had prepared, Kostoyev prepared a formal accusation of murder dated 29 November—the eve of the expiration of the ten-day time period during which Chikatilo could legally be held before being charged. The following morning, Kostoyev resumed the interrogation. According to the official protocol, Chikatilo confessed to thirty-six of the thirty-eight murders police had linked to him, although he denied two additional murders committed in 1986 the police had initially believed he had committed. One of these victims was Lyubov Golovakha, found stabbed to death in the village of Chaltyr on 23 July 1986 and whom many investigators had had serious doubts about linking to the manhunt; the second was Irina Pogoryelova, found murdered in Bataysk on 18 August 1986 and whose mutilations closely matched those inflicted upon other victims linked to the manhunt. (Note: Chikatilo would later specifically state in an outburst at his subsequent trial that he had indeed killed Pogoryelova, whom he referred to by name in this outburst.)

Chikatilo gave a full, detailed description of each murder on the list of charges, all of which were consistent with known facts regarding each killing. When prompted, he could draw a rough sketch of various crime scenes, indicating the position of the victim's body and various landmarks in the vicinity of the crime scene. Additional details provided further proof of his guilt: one victim on the list of charges was a 19-year-old student named Anna Lemesheva, whom Chikatilo had killed on 19 July 1984 near Shakhty station. Chikatilo recalled that as he had fought to overpower her, she had stated that a man named "Bars" ("Leopard") would retaliate for his attacking her. Lemesheva's fiancé had the nickname "Bars" tattooed on his hand.

"There were instances when I learned about the way people were planning to go, watched then, and killed them along the way [...] I noticed that a girl of 12 or 13 was coming behind me, carrying some kind of bag in her hand. I slowed down and let her catch up to me. We walked together beside the woods. I started talking to her, about whatever I thought might interest her. I remember she said she was going home from the store [...] I pushed her off the road and grabbed her by the waist and dragged her into the woods. I pushed her onto the ground, tore off her clothing and lay on her. At the same time, I was stabbing her, imitating sex. From that, I ejaculated [...] I threw her clothes and bag away somewhere, but I don't remember where."

— Andrei Chikatilo confessing to the 1982 murder of 13-year-old Lyubov Biryuk.

In describing his victims, Chikatilo falsely referred to them as "déclassé elements" whom he would lure to secluded areas before killing. In many instances, particularly (though not exclusively) with his male victims, Chikatilo stated he would bind the victims' hands behind their backs with a length of rope before he would proceed to kill them. He would typically inflict a multitude of knife wounds upon the victim; initially inflicting shallow knife wounds to the chest area before inflicting deeper stab and slash wounds—usually thirty to fifty in total—before proceeding to eviscerate the victim as he writhed atop his or her body until he achieved orgasm. Chikatilo had, he stated, become adept at avoiding the spurts of blood from his victims' bodies as he inflicted the knife wounds and eviscerations upon them, and would regularly sit or squat beside his victims until their hearts had stopped beating, adding that the victims' "cries, the blood and the agony gave me relaxation and a certain pleasure."

When questioned as to why most of his later victims' eyes had been stabbed or slashed, but not enucleated as his earlier victims' eyes had been, Chikatilo stated that he had initially believed in an old Russian superstition that the image of a murderer is left imprinted upon the eyes of the victim. However, in "later years", he had become convinced this was simply an old wives' tale and he had ceased to gouge out the eyes of his victims.

Chikatilo also informed Kostoyev that although he was not homosexual, a male victim offered the same arousing bloodletting as a female via his mutilations and that he had often tasted the blood of his victims, to which he stated he "felt chills" and "shook all over". He also confessed to tearing at victims' genitalia, lips, nipples and tongues with his teeth. In several instances, Chikatilo would cut or bite off the tongue of his victim as he performed his eviscerations, then—either at or shortly after the point of death—run around the body as he held the tongue aloft in one hand. (Note: In several instances when Chikatilo performed this act upon the bodies of his male victims, he enacted a childhood fantasy of being a partisan guerilla during the Nazi occupation of Ukraine who had captured and executed a Nazi soldier.) Although he also admitted that he had chewed upon the excised uterus of his female victims and the testicles of his male victims, he stated he had later discarded these body parts. Nonetheless, Chikatilo did confess to having swallowed the nipples and tongues of some of his victims.

On 30 November, Chikatilo was formally charged with each of the thirty-six murders he had confessed to, all of which had been committed between June 1982 and November 1990. (Note: Chikatilo's wife visited him on only one occasion following his confession. In their brief meeting—during which Chikatilo was unable to look his wife in the eye—his wife asked him how he could have committed such acts of savagery, Chikatilo replied: "If only I had listened to you, Feodosia [...] If only I had followed your advice and got treatment." His wife and children were later provided with new identities and a new home in an undisclosed location far from the Rostov region.) Over the following days, Chikatilo confessed to a further twenty killings which had not been connected to the case, either because the murders had been committed outside the Rostov Oblast, because the bodies had not been found or, in the case of Yelena Zakotnova, because an innocent man had been convicted and executed for the murder. (Note: Aleksandr Kravchenko later received a posthumous pardon for Zakotnova's murder.) As had been the case with the victims compiled upon the initial list of charges, Chikatilo was able to provide details of these additional killings only the perpetrator could have known: one of these additional victims, 14-year-old Lyubov Volobuyeva, had lived in south-western Siberia, and had been killed in a sorghum field near Krasnodar Airport on 25 July 1982. Chikatilo recalled that he had killed Volobuyeva in a millet field and that he had approached the girl as she sat in the waiting rooms at Krasnodar Airport. Volobuyeva, Chikatilo stated, had informed him she lived in the Siberian city of Novokuznetsk, and was awaiting a connecting flight at the airport to visit relatives.

Some of the twenty-three knives seized from Chikatilo's home following his confession

In December 1990, Chikatilo led police to the body of Aleksey Khobotov, a boy he had confessed to killing in August 1989 and whom he had buried on the outskirts of a Shakhty cemetery, proving unequivocally that he was the killer. He later led investigators to the bodies of two other victims he had confessed to killing. Three of the fifty-six victims Chikatilo confessed to killing could not be found or identified, but he was charged with killing fifty-three women and children between 1978 and 1990. He was held in the same cell in Rostov where he had been detained on 20 November to await trial.

=== Psychiatric evaluation ===
On 20 August 1991, after police had completed their interrogation, including re-enactments of all the murders at each crime scene, Chikatilo was transferred to the Serbsky Institute in Moscow to undergo a 60-day psychiatric evaluation to determine whether he was mentally competent to stand trial. Chikatilo was analysed by a senior psychiatrist, Andrei Tkachenko, who noted that Chikatilo had various physiological problems, which he attributed to prenatal brain damage. Examining Chikatilo's history, Tkachenko observed a "steady but gradual descent into perversion" which had been compounded by biological and environmental factors, with his increasingly extreme acts of homicidal violence ultimately committed to relieve internal tension. Tkachenko concluded on 18 October that although he suffered from a borderline personality disorder with sadistic features, he was fit to stand trial. In December 1991, details of Chikatilo's arrest and a brief summary of his crimes were released to the newly privatized Russian media by police.

== Trial ==
Chikatilo, pictured at his trial in April 1992

Chikatilo was brought to trial in Rostov on 14 April 1992, charged with fifty-three counts of murder in addition to five charges of sexual assault against minors committed when he had been a teacher. He was tried in Courtroom Number 5 of the Rostov Provincial Court, before Judge Leonid Akubzhanov. His trial was the first major media event of post-Soviet Russia. Shortly after his psychiatric evaluation at the Serbsky Institute, investigators had conducted a press conference in which a full list of Chikatilo's crimes was released to the press, alongside a 1984 identikit of the individual charged, but not the full name or a photograph of the accused. The media first saw Chikatilo on the first day of his trial, as he entered an iron cage specifically constructed in a corner of the courtroom to protect him from attack by the enraged and hysterical relatives of his victims. In the opening weeks of the trial, the Russian press regularly published exaggerated and often sensational headlines about the murders, referring to Chikatilo being a "cannibal" or a "maniac" and to him physically resembling a shaven-skulled, demonic individual. (Note: As a standard prison procedure to prevent the spread of lice, Chikatilo's head had been shaved.)

The first two days of the trial were devoted to Akubzhanov reading the long lists of indictments against Chikatilo. Each murder was discussed individually, and on several occasions, relatives present in the courtroom broke down in tears or fainted when details of their relatives' murders were revealed. After reading the indictment, Akubzhanov announced to the journalists present in the courtroom his intention to conduct an open trial, stating: "Let this trial at least teach us something, so that this will never happen anytime or anywhere again." Akubzhanov then asked Chikatilo to stand, identify himself and provide his date and location of birth. Chikatilo complied, although this would prove to be one of the few civil exchanges between the judge and Chikatilo.

Chikatilo was initially questioned in detail about each charge upon the indictment. Responding to specific questions regarding the murders, he often gave dismissive replies to questions, particularly when questioned as to the nature of the wounds he had inflicted upon his victims and the ruses he had used to entice his victims to the locations where he had killed them. He would become indignant only when accused of stealing personal possessions from the victims, or to his retaining organs excised from the victims missing from the crime scenes. On one occasion, when asked as to his seeming indifference as to the lifestyle and gender of those whom he had killed, Chikatilo replied: "I did not need to look for them. Every step I took, they were there." (Note: In a 1993 interview granted to a Newsweek reporter who had been based in the Soviet Union, Chikatilo would expound on this statement by claiming: "It was all a matter of chance. Of who was riding or walking near me. Or at the station.")

In what became a regular (though not continuous) occurrence throughout the trial, Akubzhanov berated Chikatilo as he questioned him in detail as to the charges; ordering him to "shut your mouth", before adding, "You're not crazy!" as Chikatilo's responses to questions deviated into his discussing issues such as the repression his family had endured throughout his childhood, and his claiming that the charges filed against him were false. These verbal exchanges would occur whether Chikatilo was cooperative or uncooperative throughout proceedings, and the manner in which the judge questioned Chikatilo repeatedly led his defence lawyer Marat Khabibulin to protest against the accusatory nature of the court proceedings. In the instances in which Chikatilo was uncooperative throughout questioning, he would simply shout over the judge, denounce the court as a farce, and launch into rambling, disjointed speeches. On occasion, Chikatilo would also expose himself to the court or sing socialist movement anthems throughout proceedings. These antics regularly resulted in his being returned to his cell as court proceedings continued in his absence.

On 21 April, Chikatilo's defence lawyer requested that Bukhanovsky be allowed to testify as to the contents of the 1985 psychological profile he had written, and his subsequent consultations with Chikatilo following his arrest, adding that Bukhanovsky could exert influence over Chikatilo and, by extension, might influence the court proceedings. This request was denied. The same day, Chikatilo began to refuse to answer any questions from the judge, the prosecutor or his defence lawyer. He refused to answer any questions for three consecutive days before stating his presumption of innocence had been irredeemably violated by the judge and that he intended to give no further testimony. The following day, proceedings were adjourned for two weeks.

Chikatilo withdrew his confessions to six of the killings for which he had been charged on 13 May, and also claimed he had killed four further victims who were not included upon the indictment. The same day, Khabibulin again submitted a request that his client be subjected to a second psychiatric evaluation. This motion was dismissed by the judge as being groundless. In response, Khabibulin rose from his seat, condemning the composition of the court, and arguing that the judge was unfit to continue presiding over the case. Chikatilo repeated his earlier remarks as to the judge making numerous rash remarks prejudging his guilt. The prosecutor, Nikolai Gerasimenko, vocally supported the defence's claim, stating that the judge had indeed made too many such comments and had committed numerous procedural violations in his lecturing and insulting the defendant. Gerasimenko further contended that in his conducting an open trial, Chikatilo had already been prejudged as being guilty by the press, before also requesting that the judge be replaced. Judge Akubzhanov would later rule that the prosecutor be replaced instead, briefly conducting the trial in the absence of a prosecutor until a replacement prosecutor, Anatoly Zadorozhny, could be found.

On 3 July, Bukhanovsky was permitted to testify as to his analysis of Chikatilo, although solely in the capacity of a witness. For three hours, Bukhanovsky testified as to his 1985 psychological profile of Chikatilo, and of the conversations he had held with Chikatilo following his arrest, which had culminated in his confession. Four psychiatric experts from the Serbsky Institute also testified as to the results of a behavioural analysis they had conducted on Chikatilo in May, following the initial adjournment of the trial. All testified as to his courtroom behaviour being strikingly in contrast to his behaviour in his cell, and that they considered his antics to be a calculated attempt to obtain acquittal on the grounds of insanity.

=== Closing arguments and conviction ===
On 9 August, the defence delivered their closing arguments before the judge. Upon beginning his 90-minute closing argument, Khabibulin first stated he had no confidence his voice would be heard above the "general outcry" for retribution against Chikatilo, before questioning the reliability of the forensic evidence presented at the trial and describing areas of Chikatilo's confessions as being "baseless". He also questioned the judge's objectivity and harked back to the decision of the court not to allow the defence to present testimony from independent psychiatrists; emphasizing that crimes of this nature could not have been committed by an individual of sane mind. Khabibulin then formally requested the judge find his client not guilty.

The following day, prosecutor Anatoly Zadorozhny delivered his closing argument before the judge. Harking towards the earlier testimony of psychiatrists at the trial, Zadorozhny argued that Chikatilo fully understood the criminality of his actions, was able to resist his homicidal impulses, and had made numerous conscious efforts to avoid detection. Zadorozhny emphasized that in 19 of the charges, the material evidence of the crimes had been provided by Chikatilo. Zadorozhny then recited each of the charges before formally requesting the death penalty. (Note: Chikatilo was not present in the courtroom throughout the prosecutor's closing argument, having again interrupted court proceedings.)

Following the conclusion of the prosecutor's closing argument, Akubzhanov invited Chikatilo back into the courtroom before formally asking him whether he would like to make a final statement on his own behalf. In response, Chikatilo simply sat mute. Akubzhanov then announced an initial date of 15 September for himself and the two official jurors to review the evidence and pass the final sentence upon Chikatilo. (This date was later postponed until 14 October.) As court announced recess, the older brother of Lyudmila Alekseyeva, a 17-year-old girl killed by Chikatilo in August 1984, threw a heavy chunk of metal at Chikatilo, hitting him in the chest. When security tried to arrest the young man, other victims' relatives shielded him.

On 14 October, the court reconvened to hear formal sentencing (this sentencing would not finish until the following day). Akubzhanov began sentencing by announcing Chikatilo guilty of fifty-two of the fifty-three murders for which he had been tried. He was sentenced to death for each offence. Chikatilo was also found guilty of five counts of sexual assault committed during the years he worked as a teacher in the 1970s. In reciting his findings, the judge read the list of murders again, before criticizing both the police and the prosecutor's department for various mistakes in the investigation which had allowed Chikatilo to remain free until 1990. Particular criticism was directed towards not local police, but the prosecutor's department—primarily procurator Issa Kostoyev—whom Akubzhanov scathed as "negligent", and who had been dismissive of Chikatilo's inclusion upon a 1987 suspect list compiled by police. Akubzhanov also rejected the numerous claims Kostoyev had made to the media in the months prior to the trial that police had deliberately withheld documents pertaining to Chikatilo from the prosecutor's department as being provably baseless, adding that proof existed he had been in possession of all internal bulletins. (Note: Akubzhanov would subsequently write to both the Public Prosecutor of Russia and the Ministry of the Interior, urging both bodies to adopt sufficient measures in order to prevent a repetition of such negligence and incompetence by the prosecutor's department.)

On 15 October, Akubzhanov formally sentenced Chikatilo to death plus eighty-six years' imprisonment for the fifty-two murders and five counts of sexual assault for which he had been found guilty. Chikatilo kicked his bench across his cage when he heard the verdict and began shouting abuse. When given an opportunity to make a speech in response to the verdict, he again remained silent. Upon passing the final sentence, Akubzhanov made the following remark:

Taking into consideration the horrible misdeeds of which he is guilty, this court has no alternative but to impose the only sentence that he deserves. I therefore sentence him to death.

Chikatilo was taken from the courtroom to his cell at Novocherkassk prison to await execution. He lodged an appeal against his conviction with the Supreme Court of Russia, but this appeal was rejected in the summer of 1993. (Note: The decision of the Russian Supreme Court at this appeal was that Chikatilo's guilt of nine of the fifty-two murders—those of Zakotnova, Tkachenko, Pozhidaev, Stalmachenok, Shalapinina, Tsana, Bilovetsky, Voronko and Kravchenko—was not sufficiently proven. Nonetheless, the Supreme Court found Chikatilo's conviction for the remaining forty-three murders sufficient, and upheld his death sentence.)

== Execution ==
Following the rejection of his appeal to the Supreme Court, Chikatilo filed a final appeal for clemency with President Boris Yeltsin. This final appeal was rejected on 4 January 1994.

On 14 February 1994, Chikatilo was taken from his death row cell to a soundproofed room in Novocherkassk prison and executed with a single gunshot behind the right ear. He was buried in an unmarked grave within the prison cemetery.

== Victims ==
Number	Name	Sex	Age	Date of murder	Linked to manhunt	Notes
1	Yelena Zakotnova	F	9	22 December 1978	No	Chikatilo's first victim. Accosted while walking home from an ice-skating rink. She was killed inside a small hut Chikatilo had secretly purchased in Shakhty.
2	Larisa Tkachenko	F	17	3 September 1981	No	Approached by Chikatilo while waiting for a bus back to her boarding school. Her body was found the following day.
3	Lyubov Biryuk	F	13	12 June 1982	Yes	Biryuk was abducted while returning from a shopping trip in the village of Donskoi. She was the first victim linked to the manhunt.
4	Lyubov Volobuyeva	F	14	25 July 1982	No	Killed in an orchard near Krasnodar Airport. Her body was found on 7 August.
5	Oleg Pozhidayev	M	9	13 August 1982	No	Chikatilo's first male victim. Pozhidayev was killed in woodland near the settlement of Enem in the Republic of Adygea. His body was never found.
6	Olga Kuprina	F	16	16 August 1982	Yes	A runaway from the Semikarakorsky District. Kuprina was killed in Kazachi Lagerya. Her body was found by a soldier gathering logs on 27 October.
7	Irina Karabelnikova	F	18	8 September 1982	Yes	A vagrant lured away from Shakhty station by Chikatilo. Her body was found on 20 September but remained unidentified until 1985.
8	Sergey Kuzmin	M	15	15 September 1982	No	Kuzmin was a runaway from a boarding school. His body was found in woodland close to Shakhty station on 12 January 1983. No soft tissue was left upon his remains, which were initially determined to be those of a female.
9	Olga Stalmachenok	F	10	11 December 1982	Yes	Lured off a bus while riding home from her piano lessons in Novoshakhtinsk. Her body was found in a cornfield on 14 April 1983.
10	Laura Sarkisyan	F	15	After 18 June 1983	No	A runaway from Armenia killed in woodland near an unmarked railway platform close to Novocherkassk. Chikatilo was cleared of this murder at his trial.
11	Irina Dunenkova	F	13	July 1983	Yes	Dunenkova was a mentally disabled student whom Chikatilo had known prior to her murder. Her body was found in Aviators' Park, Rostov, on 8 August.
12	Lyudmila Kutsyuba	F	24	July 1983	Yes	A homeless mother of two children killed in woodland near a Shakhty bus station. Her body was found on 12 March 1984.
13	Igor Gudkov	M	7	9 August 1983	Yes	Chikatilo's youngest victim. He was killed in Aviators' Park. Gudkov was the first male victim linked to the manhunt.
14	Unknown woman	F	18–25	July–August 1983	Yes	Chikatilo claimed he encountered this victim at Novoshakhtinsk bus station while she tried to find a "man (client) with a car." Her body was found on 8 October.
15	Valentina Chuchulina	F	22	After 19 September 1983	Yes	Chuchulina's body was found on 27 November in a wooded area near Kirpichnaya station.
16	Vera Shevkun	F	19	27 October 1983	Yes	Killed in a mining village near Shakhty. Her body was found on 30 October.
17	Sergey Markov	M	14	27 December 1983	Yes	Disappeared while returning home from work experience. His body was found near Novocherkassk on 4 January 1984.
18	Natalya Shalapinina	F	17	9 January 1984	Yes	Killed in Aviators' Park. Shalapinina had been a close friend of Olga Kuprina, killed by Chikatilo in 1982.
19	Marta Ryabenko	F	44	21 February 1984	Yes	Chikatilo's oldest victim. She was killed in Aviators' Park. Her body was found the following day.
20	Dmitriy Ptashnikov	M	10	24 March 1984	Yes	Lured from a stamp kiosk in Novoshakhtinsk by Chikatilo, who pretended to be a fellow collector.
21	Tatyana Petrosyan	F	29	25 May 1984	Yes	Murdered together with her daughter in woodland outside Shakhty, close to Kirpichnaya station. She had known Chikatilo since 1978. Her body was identified in 1985.
22	Svetlana Petrosyan	F	10	25 May 1984	Yes	Svetlana saw Chikatilo murder her mother before he chased her for almost half a mile and killed her with a hammer. Her decapitated body was found on 5 July.
23	Yelena Bakulina	F	21	22 June 1984	Yes	Bakulina's body was found on 27 August in the Bagasenski region of Rostov. She had been stabbed to death, and her body covered with leaves and branches.
24	Dmitriy Illarionov	M	13	10 July 1984	Yes	Vanished in Rostov while on his way to get a health certificate for summer camp. His emasculated and stabbed body was found in a cornfield on 12 August.
25	Anna Lemesheva	F	19	19 July 1984	Yes	A student who disappeared on her way home from a dental appointment. She was killed near Kirpichnaya station.
26	Sarmite Tsana	F	20	c. 28 July 1984	No	Originally from Riga. Her body was found on 9 September 1984 in Aviators' Park. Tsana's murder was the final to which Chikatilo confessed.
27	Natalya Golosovskaya	F	16	2 August 1984	Yes	Vanished on a visit to Novoshakhtinsk, where she was to visit her sister. She was killed in Aviators' Park.
28	Lyudmila Alekseyeva	F	17	7 August 1984	Yes	A student lured from a bus stop by Chikatilo, who offered to direct her to Rostov's bus terminal.
29	Unknown woman	F	20–25	8–11 August 1984	No	Chikatilo encountered this victim on the banks of the Chirchiq River while on a business trip to the Uzbek SSR. Her decapitated body was found on 16 August, but was never identified.
30	Akmaral Seydaliyeva	F	10	13 August 1984	No	Seydaliyeva was a runaway from Alma-Ata, Kazakh SSR, whom Chikatilo lured off a train in Tashkent. She was bludgeoned and stabbed to death in a cornfield.
31	Aleksandr Chepel	M	11	28 August 1984	Yes	Killed on the banks of the Don River, near where Alekseyeva had been killed. His strangled body was found on 2 September.
32	Irina Luchinskaya	F	24	6 September 1984	Yes	A Rostov librarian. Luchinskaya disappeared on her way to a sauna. She was killed in Aviators' Park.
33	Natalya Pokhlistova	F	18	1 August 1985	Yes	Pokhlistova was killed by Chikatilo near Domodedovo Airport, Moscow Oblast. Her body was found on 3 August, just 200 metres from her home.
34	Irina Gulyayeva	F	18	27 August 1985	Yes	Killed in a grove of trees near Shakhty bus station. Her body was found the following day.
35	Oleg Makarenkov	M	12	16 May 1987	No	A boarding school student killed in Revda, Sverdlovsk Oblast. Chikatilo led police to Makarenkov's remains after his arrest.
36	Ivan Bilovetsky	M	12	29 July 1987	No	Bilovetsky was killed in woodland alongside a rail line in the Ukrainian city of Zaporizhia. His body was found by his father on 30 July.
37	Yuri Tereshonok	M	16	15 September 1987	No	A vocational school student whom Chikatilo lured off a train in Leningrad. Chikatilo led police to his remains after his arrest.
38	Unknown woman	F	22–28	1–4 April 1988	No	Killed in the grounds of a metals factory near Krasny Sulin station. Her body was found on 6 April.
39	Aleksey Voronko	M	9	15 May 1988	Yes	Chikatilo encountered Voronko while on a business trip to Artyomovsk. He was killed in Ilovaisk, Ukraine.
40	Yevgeny Muratov	M	15	14 July 1988	Yes	The first victim killed near Rostov since 1985. Muratov's body was found in a forest close to Donleskhoz station on 10 April 1989.
41	Tatyana Ryzhova	F	16	28 February 1989	No	A runaway from Kamensk-Shakhtinsky, she was killed inside Chikatilo's own daughter's apartment in Shakhty. Her dismembered body was found on 9 March.
42	Aleksandr Dyakonov	M	8	11 May 1989	Yes	Killed in a thicket of bushes near Rostov city centre the day after his eighth birthday. His body was found by a taxi driver on 14 July.
43	Aleksey Moiseyev	M	10	20 June 1989	No	In his confessions, Chikatilo described Moiseyev as "a boy from Kolchugino, Vladimir Oblast, whom I took from the beach into the forest". Chikatilo confessed to this murder after his arrest.
44	Yelena Varga	F	19	19 August 1989	Yes	A student from Hungary who had a child. She was lured from a bus stop and killed in woodland close to a village near Rostov.
45	Aleksey Khobotov	M	10	28 August 1989	No	Encountered Chikatilo outside a theatre in Shakhty. He was buried in a shallow grave in a nearby cemetery. Chikatilo led police to his remains after his arrest.
46	Andrei Kravchenko	M	11	14 January 1990	Yes	Kravchenko was abducted from the streets near his Shakhty home. His emasculated body was found in a section of woodland on 19 February.
47	Yaroslav Makarov	M	10	7 March 1990	Yes	Disappeared from Rostov railway station while truanting from school. Makarov was killed in Rostov's Botanical Gardens. His body, missing the tongue and sexual organs, was found the following day.
48	Lyubov Zuyeva	F	31	4 April 1990	No	Encountered Chikatilo while travelling from Novocherkassk to Shakhty. Her skeletonized body was found in woodland close to Donleskhoz station on 24 August.
49	Viktor Petrov	M	13	28 July 1990	Yes	Chikatilo lured Petrov from the Rostov-Glavny station, where the boy and his family had chosen to await an early morning bus. He was killed in Rostov's Botanical Gardens, a few yards from where Makarov had been murdered.
50	Ivan Fomin	M	11	14 August 1990	Yes	Fomin was killed at Novocherkassk municipal beach when he entered a thicket to change his clothes. He was emasculated and stabbed 42 times. His body was found on 17 August.
51	Vadim Gromov	M	16	17 October 1990	Yes	A mentally disabled student from Shakhty. Gromov vanished while riding the train to Taganrog.
52	Viktor Tishchenko	M	16	30 October 1990	Yes	Killed in Shakhty. Tishchenko fought hard for his life; he was the victim who bit and broke Chikatilo's finger.
53	Svetlana Korostik	F	22	6 November 1990	Yes	Korostik was a homeless woman whom Chikatilo killed in woodland near Donleskhoz station. Her body was found on 13 November.

Note

Akubzhanov cleared Chikatilo of the murder of 15-year-old Laura Sarkisyan at his trial due to insufficient evidence. Sarkisyan, a runaway from Soviet Armenia, was last seen by her family on 18 June. In his confessions to police, Chikatilo had stated he had killed an Armenian girl in the early summer of 1983 and that she had been killed in a stretch of woodland close to a rural railway station between Kirpichny and Shakhty.

Although he had been unable to identify Sarkisyan's picture when presented to him, the timing of her disappearance and Chikatilo's physical description of the victim, her clothing and where he had killed her did match scattered, partial skeletal remains and personal effects which, although determined as being those of a female in her early-to-mid-teens, could not be precisely identified. Despite the fact that he had at one stage denied having committed six of the murders for which he had been brought to trial, Chikatilo never specifically disputed Sarkisyan as being a victim of his.

=== Suspected victims ===
- Chikatilo confessed to three additional murders which police were unable to verify. According to Chikatilo, these three murders were committed in and around the city of Shakhty between 1980 and 1982. Despite his confessions, police were unable to either match his descriptions of these victims to any missing persons reports, or locate any human remains, despite thoroughly searching the locations where Chikatilo stated he had committed these murders. Therefore, he was never charged with these three further killings he claimed to have committed.
- Chikatilo is the prime suspect in the murder of 18-year-old Irina Pogoryelova, a court secretary from Bataysk who had disappeared on 11 August 1986 and whose body was found buried in the grounds of a collective farm on 18 August. Pogoryelova's body bore precisely the same mutilations found upon victims Chikatilo killed both before and after 1986. In his initial confession, Chikatilo had denied he had killed Pogoryelova, yet later insisted at his trial he had indeed killed her.
- At his trial, Chikatilo claimed he had committed four further murders in addition to the fifty-three for which he was brought to trial. Presumably, three of these victims were the three he had initially confessed to having committed in 1990 and which the police were unable to either locate or match to any missing persons records. The fourth individual he specifically named was Irina Pogoryelova. If his claims of having killed four additional victims are true, the total number of victims Chikatilo claimed is fifty-seven.

== Media ==
=== Films ===
- The film Citizen X (1995) is directly based upon the murders committed by Chikatilo. Inspired by Robert Cullen's non-fiction book The Killer Department, Citizen X largely portrays the investigation of the "Rostov Ripper" murders through the experiences of Detective Viktor Burakov, in his efforts to ensnare the killer. This film casts Stephen Rea as Burakov, Jeffrey DeMunn as Chikatilo, Donald Sutherland as Colonel Mikhail Fetisov, and Max von Sydow as Dr. Alexandr Bukhanovsky. One of the film's central themes is the Soviet government's refusal to acknowledge the existence of a serial killer in USSR until perestroika.
- The film Evilenko (2004) is loosely based upon the murders committed by Chikatilo. This film casts Malcolm McDowell as Andrei Evilenko and Marton Csokas as Inspector Lesev.
- The film Child 44 (2015) is based upon the fiction novel Child 44 by Tom Rob Smith, which was itself inspired by the Chikatilo case (but with the era changed to the 1950s). Chikatilo, fictionalized as "Vladimir Malevich", is portrayed by British actor Paddy Considine.

=== Books (non-fiction) ===
Four non-fiction books have been written about the case of Andrei Chikatilo:

- Conradi, Peter (1992). The Red Ripper: Inside the Mind of Russia's Most Brutal Serial Killer. True Crime. ISBN 0-86369-618-X.
- Cullen, Robert (1993). The Killer Department: Detective Viktor Burakov's Eight-Year Hunt for the Most Savage Serial Killer of Our Times. Orion Media. ISBN 1-85797-210-4.
- Krivich, Mikhail; Olgin, Olgert (1993). Comrade Chikatilo: The Psychopathology of Russia's Notorious Serial Killer. Barricade Books. ISBN 0-942-63790-9.
- Lourie, Richard (1993). Hunting The Devil: The Pursuit, Capture and Confession of the Most Savage Serial Killer in History. HarperCollins. ISBN 0-586-21846-7.

=== Television ===
- The Hunt for the Red Ripper (1993). A 50-minute documentary directed by Martin Coenen.
- Criminal Russia: In the Wake of Satan (1997). A documentary focusing on the case of Andrei Chikatilo which was broadcast on the Russian TV channel NTV.
- Inside Story: The Russian Cracker (1999). A BBC documentary focusing upon the disproportionate number of serial killers in Rostov-on-Don in the years leading to and immediately following the collapse of the Soviet Union, and the efforts of Dr. Aleksandr Bukhanovsky to treat offenders. The case of Chikatilo is one of several included in this documentary.
- The Butcher of Rostov (2004). A 45-minute Biography Channel documentary focusing on the murders committed by Chikatilo. Viktor Burakov is among those interviewed for this documentary.
- Murderous Minds: Andrei Chikatilo (2018). A 35-minute documentary commissioned by Jansen Media. This documentary was first broadcast in March 2018.
- Chikatilo (2021). A Russian-language television mini-series illustrating the investigation into the murders committed by Chikatilo. Commissioned by OKKO Studios, this series was first broadcast in March 2021, casting Dmitry Nagiyev as Chikatilo, Konstantin Lavronenko as Colonel Kesaev, and Dmitry Vlaskin as criminal psychologist Vetvitsky.

== See also ==
- Crime in the Soviet Union
- List of incidents of cannibalism
- List of Russian serial killers
- List of serial killers by number of victims
- List of Soviet and post-Soviet serial killers nicknamed after Andrei Chikatilo

== Bibliography and further reading ==
- Berry-Dee, Christopher (2011). Cannibal Serial Killers: Profiles of Depraved Flesh-eating Murderers. New York: Ulysses Press. ISBN 978-1-569-75902-8.
- Cawthorne, Nigel (1999). The World's Greatest Serial Killers. London: Chancellor Press. ISBN 978-0-753-70089-1.
- Clarke, Phil; Briggs, Tom; Briggs, Kate (2011). Extreme Evil: Taking Crime to the Next Level. London: Canary Press. ISBN 978-1-907-79591-6.
- Conradi, Peter (1994) [1992]. The Red Ripper: Inside the Mind of Russia's Most Brutal Serial Killer. London: True Crime. ISBN 0-440-21603-6.
- Cullen, Robert (1994) [1993]. The Killer Department: Detective Viktor Burakov's Eight-Year Hunt for the Most Savage Serial Killer of Our Times. London: Orion Media. ISBN 1-85797-210-4.
- Fido, Martin (1995). Twentieth-Century Murder. London: Bracken Books. ISBN 978-1-858-91390-2.
- Frasier, David K. (1996). Murder Cases of the Twentieth Century: Biographies and Bibliographies of 280 Convicted or Accused Killers. North Carolina: McFarland & Company. ISBN 978-0-786-40184-0.
- Hall, Allan (1993). The Power and The Evil. Leicester: Blitz Editions. pp. 82–86. ISBN 978-1-856-05208-5.
- Giannangelo, Stephen J. (2012). Real-Life Monsters: A Psychological Examination of the Serial Murderer. Santa Barbara: Praeger Publishing. ISBN 978-0-31-339784-4.
- Hickey, Eric W. (2003). Encyclopedia of Murder and Violent Crime. California: SAGE Publishing. ISBN 978-0-761-92437-1.
- Kalman, Robert (2014). Born to Kill in the USSR: True Stories of Soviet Serial Killers. Canada: Friesen Press. pp. 177–198. ISBN 978-1-460-22730-5.
- Krivich, Mikhail; Olgin, Olgert (1993). Comrade Chikatilo: The Psychopathology of Russia's Notorious Serial Killer. New Jersey: Barricade Books. ISBN 0-942-63790-9.
- Lane, Bran (1994). Real-Life Crimes. London, England: Eaglemoss Publications Ltd. ISBN 978-1-856-29960-2.
- Lane, Brian; Gregg, Wilfred (1992). The Encyclopedia of Serial Killers. London: Headline Books. pp. 96–98. ISBN 978-0-7472-3731-0.
- Lewis, Brenda (2009). Mapping the Trail of a Serial Killer: How The World's Most Infamous Murderers Were Tracked Down. Connecticut: Globe Pequot Publishing Group. pp. 71–81. ISBN 978-1-461-74944-8.
- Lourie, Richard (1993). Hunting the Devil: The Pursuit, Capture and Confession of the Most Savage Serial Killer in History. London: Grafton. ISBN 0-06-017717-9.
- Marriner, Brian (1992). Cannibalism: The Last Taboo. London: Arrow Books. pp. 237–247. ISBN 1-859-58495-0.
- Philbin, Thomas; Philbin, Michael (2009). Killer Book of Serial Killers: Incredible Stories, Facts, and Trivia from the World of Serial Killers. Illinois: Sourcebooks, Inc. ISBN 978-1-402-22647-2.
- Ramsland, Katherine M. (2011). The Mind of a Murderer: Privileged Access to the Demons that Drive Extreme Violence. Santa Barbara: Praeger Publishing. pp. 135–144. ISBN 978-0-313-38672-5.
- Slovenko, Ralph (1995). Psychiatry and Criminal Culpability. New Jersey: Wiley Publishing. ISBN 978-0-471-05425-2.
- Wilson, Colin (ed.). "Murder in Mind – Andrei Chikatilo". Murder in Mind (7). London: Marshall Cavendish. ISSN 1364-5803.
- Wilson, Colin; Wilson, Damon (2006). The World's Most Evil Murderers: Real-Life Stories of Infamous Killers. Trowbridge: Paragon Publishing. pp. 117–134. ISBN 978-1-405-48828-0.
- Wynn, Douglas (1996). On Trial for Murder: Over 200 of the Most Dramatic Trials of the 20th Century. London: Pan Books. pp. 51–54. ISBN 0-330-33947-8.
