= Issa Kostoyev =

Russian government attorney and bureaucrat (born 1942)

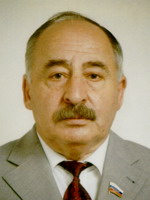
Issa Kostoyev in 2008

Issa Magometovich Kostoyev (Russian: Исса́ Магоме́тович Косто́ев; born August 8, 1942) is a Russian government attorney and bureaucrat. He was the representative in the Federation Council from the executive body of state power of the Republic of Ingushetia (2002–2009), and a member of the Federation Council Committee on Defense and Security and Commission on Natural Monopolies. State Counselor of Justice 2 classes.

== Early life ==
Born in Checheno-Ingush Autonomous Soviet Socialist Republic he and his parents were deported soon after his birth to Gulag in Kazakh Soviet Socialist Republic.

He graduated from Al-Farabi Kazakh National University with a specialty in jurisprudence.

== Career ==
Kostoyev began working in the prosecutor's offices of North Ossetia, the Chechen-Ingush Autonomous Soviet Socialist Republic, the prosecutor's office of the USSR and the Prosecutor General's Office of the Russian Federation. He headed investigative groups that engaged in the search for Rostov maniac Andrei Chikatilo and Smolensk maniac Vladimir Storozhenko.

He supports the death penalty for serial killers and pedophiles.

== Awards and honours ==
- Order of the Red Banner of Labour (1982)
- Medal "Veteran of Labour" (1989)
- Honoured Lawyer of Russia (1997)
- Order of Honour (2002)
- Order "For Merit to the Fatherland", 4th class (2007)
- Order of Friendship (2022)
- In his book "A Most Wanted Man" John le Carré gave the name Issa to his Chechen character in it after Issa Kostoev.
