= Jeffrey DeMunn =

American actor (born 1947)

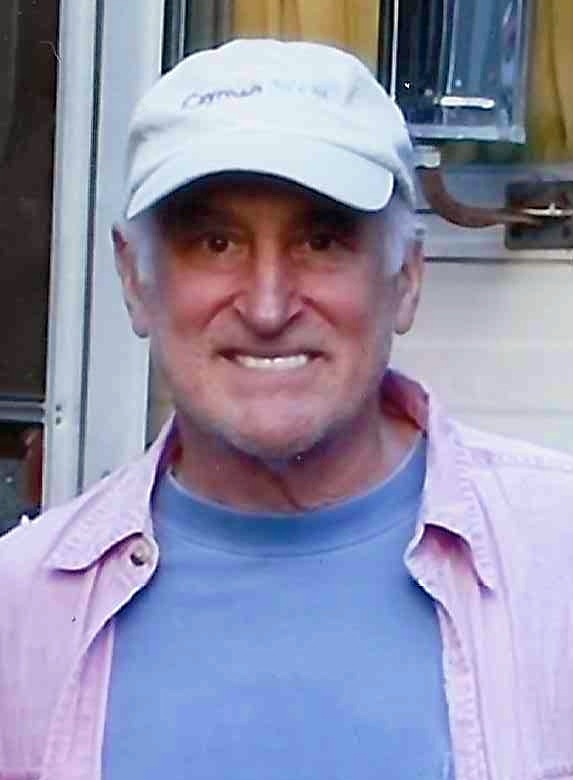
- DeMunn in 2014
- Born: April 25, 1947 (age 79); Buffalo, New York, U.S.
- Occupation: Actor
- Years active: 1972–present
- Spouses: Ann Sekjaer (m. 1974; div. 1995); Kerry Leah (m. 2001)
- Children: 2

Jeffrey P. DeMunn (born April 25, 1947) is an American actor. He is known for his collaborations with director Frank Darabont, having appeared in The Shawshank Redemption (1994), The Green Mile (1999), The Majestic (2001), and The Mist (2007). Demunn also played Dale Horvath in The Walking Dead (2010–2012), but quit in protest once Darabont was fired.

His other roles include Captain Esteridge in The Hitcher (1986), Sheriff Herb Geller in The Blob (1988), Andrei Chikatilo in Citizen X (1995), and Charles Rhoades Sr. in Billions (2016–2023).

== Early life ==
DeMunn was born in Buffalo, New York, the son of Violet (née Paulus) and James DeMunn, and a stepson of actress Betty Lutes DeMunn. He graduated from Union College with a Bachelor of Arts in English.

== Career ==
=== Theatre roles ===
He moved to the United Kingdom in 1970, receiving theatrical training at the Bristol Old Vic Theatre School. When he returned to the United States in 1972, he performed in a Royal Shakespeare Company National Tour's production of King Lear and A Midsummer Night's Dream. After this he starred in several off-Broadway productions, including Bent, Modigliani, and A Midsummer Night's Dream. DeMunn also participated in productions of developing plays at the Eugene O'Neill Theater Center. In 1983 he starred in a production of K2, which earned him a Tony Award nomination. He most recently starred in Death of a Salesman at San Diego's Old Globe Theater in 2012 and A Family For All Occasions at the Bank Street Theatre in 2013.

=== Film roles ===
DeMunn is known for his collaborations with director Frank Darabont, who has cast him in films such as The Shawshank Redemption, The Green Mile, The Majestic and The Mist. He also appeared in the 1988 remake of The Blob, which Darabont co-wrote. He also narrated the audiobooks for Dreamcatcher and The Colorado Kid. In 1995, he won a CableACE Award as Best Supporting Actor in a Movie or Miniseries for his portrayal of serial killer Andrei Chikatilo in the HBO film Citizen X and received a Primetime Emmy Award for Outstanding Supporting Actor in a Miniseries or a Movie nomination.

=== Television roles ===
DeMunn has made several guest appearances on series television. His extensive TV résumé includes shows such as Kojak, Moonlighting, LA Law and The West Wing. He appeared in the recurring role of Norman Rothenberg in Law & Order and Trial by Jury. He appeared in the television miniseries Storm of the Century. He portrayed Dale Horvath in Frank Darabont's television adaptation of the comic book series The Walking Dead, for two seasons from 2010 to 2012. Upon his departure, he was cast as Hal Morrison in the 2013 television series Mob City, which was also created by Darabont.

DeMunn stars on the Showtime series Billions as Chuck Rhoades Sr., the wealthy father of Paul Giamatti's Chuck Rhoades Jr.

== Personal life ==
DeMunn married Ann Sekjaer in 1974; they divorced in 1995. He married Kerry Leah in 2001.

== Filmography ==
=== Film ===
Year	Title	Role
1980	Resurrection	Joe McCauley
1980	The First Deadly Sin	Sergeant Fernandez Correll
1980	I'm Dancing as Fast as I Can	Dr. Roberts
1980	Christmas Evil	Philip Stadling
1981	Ragtime	Harry Houdini
1982	Frances	Clifford Odets
1983	The Face of Rage	Jeff Hammil
1984	Windy City	Bobby
1985	Warning Sign	Dr. Dan Fairchild
1986	The Hitcher	Captain Esteridge
1988	The Blob	Sheriff Herb Geller
1988	Betrayed	Bobby Flynn
1989	Blaze	Eldon Tuck
1991	Eyes of an Angel	George
1992	Newsies	Mayer Jacobs
1994	The Shawshank Redemption	Prosecutor
1994	Safe Passage	Doctor
1995	Killer: A Journal Of Murder	Sam Lesser
1996	Phenomenon	Professor John Ringold
1997	Turbulence	Brooks
1997	RocketMan	Paul Wick
1998	Harvest	Jake Yates
1998	The X-Files	Dr. Ben Bronschweig
1999	The Green Mile	Harry Terwilliger
2001	The Majestic	Ernie Cole
2002	Swimming Upstream	Dr. Henry Berkson
2003	The Lucky Ones	Simon
2006	Hollywoodland	Art Weissman
2006	Covert One: The Hades Factor	Steven Haldane
2007	The Mist	Dan Miller
2008	Burn After Reading	Cosmetic surgeon
2009	Cayman Went	Rodgers Bowman
2010	6 Souls	Dr. Harding
2011	Another Happy Day	Lee BingBing
2014	Adult Beginners	Bill
2016	Halfway	Walt
2017	Marshall	Dr. Sayer
2018	The Amaranth	Richard Kendrick
2026	Carousel	TBA

=== Television ===
Year	Title	Role	Notes
1978	The Last Tenant	Vinnie	Television film
1979	Sanctuary of Fear	Whitney Fowler	Television film
1980	King Crab	Sam Campana	Television film
1981	Word of Honor	District Attorney Burke	Television film
1981	Mourning Becomes Electra	Captain Adam Brant	TV mini-series, 2 episodes
1982	A Midsummer Night's Dream	Bottom	
1982	I Married Wyatt Earp	Doc Holliday	
1982	Sessions	Dr. Walter Hemmings	
1982	Enormous Changes at the Last Minute	Richardo	
1983	O'Malley	Carl	
1984	When She Says No	Brain Garvey	
1985	Hill Street Blues	Jerry Goff	Episode: "G.Q."
1985	The Twilight Zone	Bob Spindler	Episode: "Kentucky Rye"
1985	A Time to Live	Larry Weisman	Television film
1986	Spenser: For Hire	Jacob Zaleski	Episode: "In a Safe Place"
1986	Moonlighting	Roger Clements	Episode: "Funeral for a Door Nail"
1986	American Masters	Eugene O'Neill	Episode: "Eugene O'Neill: A Glory of Ghosts"
1986	Who Is Julia?	Dr. David Matthews	Television film
1987	Kojak: The Price of Justice	Marsucci	Television film
1987	Young Harry Houdini	Harry Houdini	Television film
1988–1990	American Playhouse	George / George Pierce Baker / Peter	3 episodes
1988	Windmills of the Gods	Rogers	Television film
1988	Doubletake	Andrew Lane	Television film
1988	Lincoln	William Herndon	2 episodes
1989	CBS Summer Playhouse	Nate Goodman	Episode: "Elysian Fields"
1989	Dear John	Neil Cramer	Episode: "Kate, a Date & Fate"
1989	Settle the Score	Dr. Josh Longcrest	Television film
1990	By Dawn's Early Light	Harpoon	Television film
1990	L.A. Law	Peter Reynolds	Episode: "Bang... Zoom... Zap"
1990	Crash: The Mystery of Flight 1501	Scott Cody	Television film
1991	The Haunted	Jack Smurl	Television film
1992	Treacherous Crossing	Dr. Johnston	Television film
1992	Jonathan: The Boy Nobody Wanted	Frank Moore	Television film
1993–2008	Law & Order	Professor Norman Rothenberg	8 episodes
1993	Barbarians at The Gate	H. John Greeniaus	Television film
1993	TriBeCa	Ben Barker	Episode: "The Rainmaker"
1994	Betrayal of Trust	Dick Shelton	Television film
1995	Citizen X	Andrei Chikatilo	Television film
1995	Hiroshima	J. Robert Oppenheimer	Television film
1995	Almost Golden: The Jessica Savitch Story	Mel Korn	Television film
1995	Down Came a Blackbird	Rob Rubenstein	Television film
1995	Ebbie	Jake Marley	Television film
1997	Cracker	Henry Farner	Episode: "An American Dream"
1997	Night Sins	SAC Bruce Di Palma	Television film
1997	A Christmas Memory	Seabone	Television film
1997	Path to Paradise: The Untold Story of the World Trade Center Bombing	Robert Brokaw	Television film
1998	The Outer Limits	Dr. Adam Pike	Episode: "Fear Itself"
1998	Black Cat Run	Bill Grissom	Television film
1999	Storm of the Century	Robbie Beals	3 episodes
2000	Noriega: God's Favorite	Nunico	Television film
2000	D.C.	Mr. Scott	Episode: "Truth"
2000	The Fugitive	Will Alagash	Episode: "Miles to Go"
2000–2001	Law & Order: Special Victims Unit	Charles Philips	2 episodes
2001	Gideon's Crossing	Dr. Tom Kagen	Episode: "Dr. Cherry Must Be Stopped"
2001	The Practice	Attorney Gordon Keene	Episode: "Honor Code"
2002	ER	Doctor	Episode: "Next of Kin"
2003	Hack	Vasily Yurchenko	Episode: "Gone"
2003	Our Town	Editor Charles Webb	Television film
2004	The West Wing	Kenneth Sean "Ken" O'Neal	Episode: '"An Khe"
2004	Law & Order	Norman Rothenberg	Episode: "Caviar Emptor"
2005	Law & Order: Trial by Jury	Professor Norman Rothenberg	Episode: "Truth or Consequences"
2005	Empire Falls	Horace	2 episodes
2008	Cashmere Mafia	Henry Gorham	Episode: "Yours, Mine and Hers"
2010	God in America	John Hughes	Episode: "A New Adam/A New Eden"
2010–2012	The Walking Dead	Dale Horvath	16 episodes
2012	Chicago Fire	Peter	Episode: "Mon Amour"
2013	The Good Wife	Chief Justice Ryvlan	2 episodes
2013	Mob City	Hal Morrison	6 episodes
2014	The Affair	Dr. Henry	Episode: "9"
2015	The Blacklist	T. Earl King VI	Episode: "T. Earl King VI"
2016–2023	Billions	Chuck Rhoades Sr.	44 episodes
2016	Divorce	Max Brodkin	4 episodes
2018	Dallas & Robo	Charlie (voice)	Episode: "I Was a Teenage Cannibal Biker"

== Stage ==
Year	Title	Role	Notes
1972–1973	King Lear	Edmund	National Tour
1972–1973	A Midsummer Night's Dream	Demetrius	National Tour
1975	Augusta		
1976–1977	Comedians	Phil Murray	Understudy; Music Box Theatre
1977–1978	A Prayer for My Daughter	Jack Delasante	Public Theatre
1979–1980	Bent	Horst	Replacement; Apollo Theater
1980	Modigliani	Amedeo Modigliani	Astor Place Theatre
1982	A Midsummer Night's Dream	Nick Bottom	Central Park
1983	K2	Taylor	Brooks Atkinson Theatre
1983–1984	Don Juan	Don Juan	Highlight Theater
1984	The Country Girl	Bernie	Chelsea Playhouse
1986	The Hands of Its Enemy	Howard	New York City Center
1987	Sleight of Hand	Dancer	Cort Theatre
1988	Spoils of War	Andrew	Music Box Theatre
1992–1993	One Shoe Off	Leonard	Second Stage Theatre
1994	Hedda Gabler	George Tesman	Criterion Center Stage Right
1996	Greensboro: A Requiem	Jersey guy	McCarter Theatre
1998	Gun-Shy	Duncan	Playwright's Horizons Theatre
1999–2000	The Price	Victor Franz	Royale Theatre
2001	Temporary Help	Karl	Westport Country Playhouse
2002–2003	Our Town	Editor Charles Webb	Booth Theatre
2005	The Last Days of Judas Iscariot	Judge Littlefield / Caiaphas the Elder / St. Matthew	Public Theater
2005	What Am I Doing Here?	Man #1	Flea Theater
2005	A Picasso	Pablo Picasso	New York City Center
2006	Stuff Happens	Donald Rumsfeld	Public Theatre
2007	King Lear	King Lear	California Shakespeare Theater
2008	A Geometry Fire	Bob / Chuck	Rattlestick Playwrights Theater
2011	Death of a Salesman	Willy Loman	Old Globe Theatre
2012	King Lear	King Lear	Frog and Peach Theatre
2013	A Family For All Occasions	Howard	Bank Street Theatre
2014	A Great Wilderness	Walt	Williamstown Theatre Festival
2019	Outside Mullingar	Tony Reilly	Unicorn Theatre

== Awards and nominations ==
Year	Result	Award	Title	Category
1978	Won	Drama Desk Award	A Prayer for My Daughter	Outstanding Featured Actor in a Play
1983	Nominated	Tony Award	K2	Best Performance by a Leading Actor in a Play
1995	Won	CableACE Award	Citizen X	Supporting Actor in a Movie or Miniseries
1995	Nominated	Emmy Award	Citizen X	Outstanding Supporting Actor in a Miniseries or a Movie
1999	Nominated	Screen Actors Guild Award	The Green Mile	Outstanding Performance by a Cast in a Motion Picture
2006	Won	Drama Desk Award	Stuff Happens	Outstanding Ensemble Performance
2011	Nominated	Craig Noel Award	Death of a Salesman	Outstanding Featured Performance in a Play - Male
