= Kirpichnoye, Vologda Oblast =

Kirpichnoye Кирпичное
- Settlement
- Location within Vologda Oblast Location within Russia
- Coordinates: 59°00′N 41°10′E
- Country: Russia
- Region: Vologda Oblast
- District: Gryazovetsky District
- Time zone: UTC+3:00

Kirpichnoye (Russian: Кирпичное) is a rural locality (a settlement) in Vokhtozhskoye Rural Settlement, Gryazovetsky District, Vologda Oblast, Russia. The population was 13 as of 2002.

== Geography ==
Kirpichnoye is located 91 km (57 mi) northeast of Gryazovets (the district's administrative centre) by road. Vosya is the nearest rural locality.
