= Kirpichny, Tikhoretsky District =

Kirpichny Кирпичный
- Settlement
- Location of Kirpichny
- Location of Kirpichny Kirpichny (Krasnodar Krai)
- Coordinates: 45°47′N 40°9′E
- Country: Russia
- Federal subject: Krasnodar Krai
- Elevation: 45 m (148 ft)

Population (2010 Census)
  - Total: 38

Administrative status
  - Capital of: Tikhoretsk

Municipal status
  - Municipal district: Tikhoretsky Municipal District
  - Urban settlement: Tikhoretskoye Urban Settlement
- Time zone: UTC+3 (MSK)
- Postal code(s): 352105
- OKTMO ID: 03654402111

Kirpichny (Russian: Кирпичный) is a settlement in Tikhoretsky District of Krasnodar Krai. Population: 38 (2010 Census);

The settlement consists of two main streets Alekseevskaya (Russian: Алексеевская), and Kirpichnaya (Russian: Кирпичная).
