= The Killer Department =

1993 non-fiction book by Robert Cullen

The Killer Department: Detective Viktor Burakov's Eight-Year Hunt for the Most Savage Serial Killer in Russian History
- Title page for The Killer Department: Detective Viktor Burakov's Eight-Year Hunt for the Most Savage Serial Killer in Russian History (1993)
- Author: Robert Cullen
- Subject: Andrei Chikatilo
- Genre: Non-fiction
- Publisher: Pantheon Books
- Publication date: 1993
- ISBN: 0679422765

The Killer Department: Detective Viktor Burakov's Eight-Year Hunt for the Most Savage Serial Killer in Russian History is a non-fiction book detailing the manhunt, capture and subsequent conviction of Russian serial killer Andrei Chikatilo. Written by Robert Cullen (at the time a foreign reporter covering issues relating to the Soviet Union and Russia for The New Yorker magazine), the book was released in 1993.

The Killer Department was made into a feature film titled Citizen X in 1995.

== Overview ==
The hardcover overview from amazon.com says: "obsessed with finding the killer, faced formidable odds-among them the maze of the Soviet system".
