= Crime in the Soviet Union =

Crime in the Soviet Union was separated into "ordinary crime" and "political crime." Soviet authorities did not release crime data.

Crime statistics were a state secret in the USSR from the late 1920s to the early 1930s. In the following decades, the Soviet government only released partial information about crime in the USSR. It was only in the 1960s that the Soviet government began to classify and record crime in a systematic manner, but still prevented professional Soviet criminologists from accessing the full data. Perestroika eased some of the access to the crime data.

It was only with the collapse of the Soviet Union that crime data became more widely available. Reconstructions of Soviet crime data after the collapse of the USSR indicate that incarceration rates during Stalin's rule were "extremely high" and that the criminal justice system operated on a presumption of guilt, high rates of capital punishment, criminalization of workplace violations, and the high prevalence of "political crimes."

== Ideology ==
Soviet sociologists argued that crime was rooted in want and poverty, rather than rooted in human nature.

Soviet criminology was significantly influenced by the works of Stalinist prosecutor Andrey Vyshinsky who introduced a number of measures into the penal code and investigatory practice that were unusual in other legal systems. Law was to be perceived not as a means of determining individual guilt but dialectically and as part of broader class struggle. Based on that premise, people could be convicted even with the absence of actual crime if they simply belonged to a vaguely defined bourgeois class or if their conviction would be broadly beneficial for the revolutionary movement.

Apart from this judicial practice, the penal code of USSR contained a number of very specific crimes generally classified as "counter-revolutionary", such as contacts with foreigners or any other kind of opposition or criticism of the communist party. Article 70 listed "anti-Soviet propaganda". Article 83 - "illegally leaving USSR". Article 190-1 punished dissemination, "in verbal form", of "knowingly false" statements, defaming USSR or its social structure.

Speculation, defined as any form of private trade with intent to make profit, was also a crime per article 154 of the Penal Code of USSR. Article 162 made a crime engaging in "banned" A basic premise of Marxism is that crime is a socio-economic phenomenon:

"The elimination of private property in the means of production, the eradication of the exploitation of one person by another, and the resolution of social antagonisms led to the disappearance of basic social roots of crime".

— B. A. Viktorov, Deputy Minister for Internal Affairs

Some Marxist theorists contended that the most immediate reasons for crime in the Soviet Union were mental retardation, poor upbringing, and capitalist influence. This led to novel inventions in the field of psychiatry ("delusion of reformism", sluggish schizophrenia) used as an instrument of repression against critics.

== Punishment ==
In 1989 the Soviet Union had few prisons. About 99% of convicted criminals served their sentences in labor camps, supervised by the Main Directorate for Corrective Labor Camps which was under the MVD. The camps had four regimes of ascending severity. In the strict-regime camps, inmates worked at the most difficult jobs, usually outdoors, and received meager rations. Jobs were less demanding and rations better in the camps with milder regimes. The system of corrective labor was regarded by Soviet authorities successful in that the rate of recidivism was quite low. Prisons and labor camps, in the views of former inmates and Western observers, however, were notorious for their harsh conditions, arbitrary and sadistic treatment of prisoners, and flagrant human rights abuses. In 1989 new legislation, which emphasized rehabilitation rather than punishment, was being drafted to "humanize" the special system. Nevertheless, in 1989 conditions for many prisoners had changed little.

Relocation of petty criminals outside of large cities was also quite common practice of crime management.

=== Death penalty ===
The death penalty, carried out by shooting, was applied in the Soviet Union for multiple reasons at various periods in time including treason, espionage, terrorism, sabotage, certain types of murder, rape, bribery and theft of state property. Otherwise, the maximum punishment for a first offender was fifteen years. Parole was permitted in some cases after completion of half of the sentence, and periodic amnesties sometimes also resulted in early release.

== Collapse of the Soviet Union ==
Near and after the collapse of the Soviet Union, crime statistics moved sharply and uniformly upward. From 1991 to 1992, the number of officially reported crimes and the overall crime rate each showed a 27 percent increase; the crime rate nearly doubled between 1985 and 1992. By the early 1990s, theft, burglary, and other acts against property accounted for about two-thirds of all crime in Russia. Of particular concern to citizens, however, was the rapid growth of violent crime, including gruesome homicides.

Large parts of the Penal Code concerning crimes such as private trade (art. 154), criticism of the communist party and other political crimes (art. 58) were revoked in 1993.

== See also ==
- Crime in Russia
- Marxism
- Criminology
- Kazan phenomenon
