= Vlasta Vrána =

Canadian actor of Czech descent (born 1950)

- Born: 1950 (age 75–76); Norway
- Occupation: Actor
- Years active: 1975–present
- Organizations: ACTRA; EQUITY
- Height: 5 ft 11 in (180 cm)

Vlasta Vrána (born 1950) is a Czech-Canadian actor of stage, film, and television. He has appeared in over 285 films, television, and theatre productions, including voice roles, narration, and advertisements.

== Early life ==
Vrána was born in Norway to Czech parents, and moved to Canada at age four.

== Career ==
He made his feature-film debut in Canadian filmmaker David Cronenberg's Shivers. Other film appearances include The Blue Man (1985), The Kiss (1988), Highlander III: The Sorcerer (1994), Waking the Dead (2000), and Press Run (2000). Vrána played Fire Chief Wickersham in Secret Window (2004), and Booker (MPC) in The Day After Tomorrow (2004). He also appeared in Pachamama (2018).

On television, Vrána has appeared in shows and films, including The New Avengers (1977), The Littlest Hobo (1980), The Hitchhiker (1985), Choices (1986), Spearfield's Daughter (1986), War of the Worlds (1990), After Amy (2001), Friday the 13th: the Series (1989, 1990), Sirens (1995), Windsor Protocol (1997), All Souls (2001), Mom P.I. (1991), and Varian's War (2001).

Vrána speaks English, Czech, and French, and performs accents. As a voice actor his credits include the video games Assassin's Creed and Splinter Cell, animated films such as Heavy Metal (1981) and Heavy Metal 2000, Japanese animation such as The Mysterious Cities of Gold (1982–1983), narration, documentaries, and commercials on radio and television. He narrated the Canada Vignettes and other films for the National Film Board of Canada.

== Awards ==
Vlasta Vrána awards and nominations
| Year | Award | Category | Result | Ref. |
|---|---|---|---|---|
| 2005 | ACTRA | Award of Excellence | Won | |
| 2022 | ACTRA | Outstanding Voice Performance – Masculine for Felix and the Treasure of Morgäa | Won | |

== Filmography ==
=== Film ===
- Shivers (1975) as Kresimer Sviben
- Rabid (1977) as Cop at Clinic
- One Man (1977) as Gendron's Colleague
- Blackout (1978)
- Canada Vignettes (1978, Short) as Narrator
- Jigsaw (L'homme en colère) (1978) as Le gérant du club
- Happy Birthday to Me (1981) as Bartender
- Gas (1981) as Baron Stuyvesant
- Heavy Metal (1981) as Barbarian Leader (voice) (segment "Taarna")
- The Amateur (1981) as Guide
- Top Priority (1981)
- The Emperor of Peru (1982) as Policeman
- Hard Feelings (1982) as Mr. Holland
- A Room Full of Energy (1982, Short) as Narrator
- Candy the Striper (1983 video) as Guy at Bar
- Hey Babe! (1983) as Roy
- The Surrogate (1984) as Bill
- Breaking All the Rules (1985) as Detective
- The Blue Man (1985) as Scott
- The Morning Man (1986)
- Cat City (1986) as Mr. Gatto (English dub, voice)
- Keeping Track (1986) as Chuck
- Nowhere to Hide (1987) as Sonny Cambria
- The Gnomes' Great Adventure (1987, original version) as Swift
- Mario, Mike and the Great Gretzky (1988, Documentary) as amusing Narrator
- The Kiss (1988) as Bishop
- Jesus of Montreal (1989) as Fr. Leclerc (English dub, voice)
- Eddie and the Cruisers II: Eddie Lives! (1989) as Frank
- Nail Soup: Scandinavian Folktale (1989) as Narrator
- Falling Over Backwards (1990) as Drunk
- Angel Square (1990) as Logg
- Whispers (1990) as Sheriff Laurenski
- Money (1991) as Mel Glatzman
- Scanners II: The New Order (1991) as Lt. Gelson
- The Jungle Book (1991) as Grizzle
- Gulliver's Travels (1992) (voice)
- Sandokan (1992) (voice)
- Brainscan (1994) as Frank
- Warriors (1994) as Mr. Parker
- Stalked (1994) as Sanders
- Highlander III: The Sorcerer (1994) as Vorisek
- Relative Fear (1994) as Mr. Schulman
- Hollow Point (1996) as FBI Agent in Chase
- Marked Man (1996) as Warden Jackson
- Mother Night (1996) as August Krapptauer
- Hawk's Vengeance (1996 video) as Duquesne
- Natural Enemy (1996 video) as Stanley
- Night of the Demons 3 (1997 video) as Dewhurst
- Stranger in the House (1997) as Alex Alexander
- The Peacekeeper (1997) as General Douglas
- The Assignment (1997) as KGB Head Officer
- Kayla (1997) as Lyman Snow
- Escape from Wildcat Canyon (1996) as Tully
- Kayla (1998)
- The Ultimate Weapon (1998) as 'Top' Drummond
- Eye of the Beholder (1999) as Mr. Hugo Sr.
- Grey Owl (1999) as Harry Champlin
- Running Home (1999) as Robinson
- Waking the Dead (2000) as Priest at Sarah's Funeral
- Press Run (2000) as Sam Kettle
- Revenge (2000) as Dan McCartney
- Reaper (2000) as Sheriff Norris
- Believe (2000) as Mortimer Higgins
- Where the Money Is (2000) as Jewelry Store Employee
- Heavy Metal 2000 (2000) as Street Vendor (voice)
- The List (2000) (voice)
- Cause of Death (2001) as Al Bailey
- Protection (2001) as Shimanski
- Fidel (2001, Documentary) as Narrator
- Requiem for Fanny (2001, Documentary) as Narrator
- The Book of Eve (2002) as Steve Lock
- Alone We Stand (2002, Short) as Narrator
- Levity (2003) as Man on Parole Board
- The Human Stain (2003) as Solly Tabak
- Timeline (2003) as Monk
- Secret Window (2004) as Fire Chief Wickersham
- The Day After Tomorrow (2004) as Booker (MPC)
- Wicker Park (2004) as Jeweller
- A Year in the Death of Jack Richards(2004) as Jack Richards
- Manners of Dying (2004) as Doctor Lowe
- Spookley the Square Pumpkin (2004 video) as Narrator
- Black Eyed Dog (2006) as Andreas
- WarGames: The Dead Code (2008 video) as Ivan Prokosh
- Dead Like Me: Life After Death (2009 video) as Gregor
- Arctic Blast (2010) as Narrator
- Territories (2010) as Sheriff White
- Upside Down (2012) as Mr. Hunt
- Pinocchio (2012) as Mangiafuoco / The Jailer (English dub, voice)
- Red 2 (2013) as General McKennon
- The Informant (2013) as Contrôleur Nichols
- The Perfect Husband (2014) as Gardener
- Gurov and Anna (2014) as Audiobook Narrator
- Race (2016) as St-John
- The Glass Castle (2017) as Mr. Lehocky
- The Zone (2017) as Stalker
- Pachamama (2018) as Shaman
- Hall (2020) as Peter
- Felix and the Treasure of Morgäa (Félix et le trésor de Morgäa) (2021) as Tom (English version)
- Old Guys in Bed (2025) as Mr. Horvath

=== Television ===
Vlasta Vrána live action television credits
| Year | Title | Role | Notes | Ref. |
|---|---|---|---|---|
| 1977 | The New Avengers | Karavitch | 1 episode | |
| 1979 | The Spirit Adventure: Night Flight | Radio Operator | TV movie | |
| 1980 | The Littlest Hobo | Policeman | 2 episodes | |
| 1983 | Illusion | Ben Grover | TV movie | |
| 1983 | Cook and Peary: The Race to the Pole | Murphy | TV movie | |
| 1983 | A Matter of Cunning | Ted Haskell | TV movie | |
| 1984 | Charlie Grant's War | Police Chief | TV movie | |
| 1985 | Secret Weapons | Ivan | TV movie | |
| 1985 | The Hitchhiker | Mark Greenburg / Undercover Cop #2 | 2 episodes | |
| 1985 | A Time to Live | Policeman Grosso | TV movie | |
| 1986 | Choices | Minister | TV movie | |
| 1986 | C.A.T. Squad | Unknown | TV movie | |
| 1986 | He Shoots, He Scores | Popov | 1 episode | |
| 1986 | Spearfield's Daughter | Gerd | TV miniseries | |
| 1987 | Amerika | Sergei | TV miniseries | |
| 1987 | Opération Ypsilon | Katsender | TV movie | |
| 1987 | Ford: The Man and the Machine | William Murphy | TV movie | |
| 1988 | The Mills of Power | Frank Genereux | TV miniseries | |
| 1988 | God Bless the Child | Harold Matthews | TV movie | |
| 1988 | C.A.T. Squad: Python Wolf | Doctor | TV movie | |
| 1988 | Hitting Home | Phil Grande | TV movie | |
| 1988 | Midnight Magic | Ryan Burr | TV movie | |
| 1989 | Red Earth, White Earth | William | TV movie | |
| 1989 | Day One | Hans Bethe | TV movie | |
| 1989 | Champagne Charlie | Hawkins | TV movie | |
| 1990 | April Morning | Paul Revere | TV movie | |
| 1990 | War of the Worlds | Jonathan Laporte | 1 episode | |
| 1989, 1990 | Friday the 13th: The Series | Webster Eby / Sheriff | 2 episodes | |
| 1989, 1993 | Street Legal | Howard Champion / Mario Pestano | 2 episodes | |
| 1990 | Counterstrike | Detective Lt. Samuelson | 2 episodes "The Beginning" (S1.E14) "Breaking Point" (S2.E7) | |
| 1991 | Deadly Surveillance | Palatzo | TV movie | |
| 1991 | Mom P.I. | Unknown | 1 episode | |
| 1991–1992 | Urban Angel | Lieutenant Drabeck | 15 episodes | |
| 1992 | A Bunch of Munsch | (voice) | Episode: "David's Father/Pigs" | |
| 1993 | Flight from Justice | Nathan | TV movie | |
| 1993 | Vendetta II: The New Mafia | Benny | TV movie | |
| 1994 | The Lifeforce Experiment | Dr. Robbie Allman | TV movie | |
| 1995 | Tales of the Wild | Jacques | aka Aventures dans le Grand Nord; Episode: "Kazan" | |
| 1995 | Sirens | Arnold Freize | 1 episode | |
| 1995 | Hiroshima | Gen. Tom Farrell | TV movie | |
| 1995 | Crosswinds | Harry | TV movie | |
| 1996 | For Love Alone: The Ivana Trump Story | Dr. Zimmerman | TV movie | |
| 1996 | Midnight in Saint Petersburg | Hans Schreiber | TV movie | |
| 1996 | Due South | Henri Cloutier | 1 episode | |
| 1996 | Gotti | Romual Piecyk | TV movie | |
| 1997 | While My Pretty One Sleeps | Bishop | TV movie | |
| 1997 | Windsor Protocol | Hardy's Aide | TV movie | |
| 1997 | Lobby | Jacques Baldwin | 2 episodes | |
| 1997 | Ivanhoe | Reginald Front-de-Boeuf | TV miniseries | |
| 1997, 1998 | The Hunger | Boatman / Rhys | 2 episodes | |
| 1998 | Glory & Honor | Morris Jesup | TV movie | |
| 1998 | Thunder Point | (additional voices) | TV movie | |
| 1998 | The Girl Next Door | Howard Poolin | TV movie starring Tracey Gold | |
| 1998 | L'Ombre de l'épervier | De LaRosbille | | |
| 1999 | Cold Squad | Valentin Kucharek | 1 episode | |
| 1999 | Bonnano: A Godfather's Story | Franklin Roosevelt | TV movie | |
| 1999 | The Collectors | Sgt Grander | TV movie | |
| 1999 | Emily of New Moon | Wendall McKay | 1 episode | |
| 1999 | The Legend of Sleepy Hollow | Mr. Van Tassle | TV movie | |
| 1999 | The Maurice Rocket Richard Story | Voix à la radio | 2 episodes | |
| 1999 | Revenge of the Land | Unknown | TV movie | |
| 2001 | Heart: The Marilyn Bell Story | George McBlair | TV movie | |
| 2001 | All Souls | Dr. Lyman Brisco | 1 episode | |
| 2001 | Varian's War | Franz Werfel | TV movie | |
| 2001 | Dr. Quinn, Medicine Woman: The Heart Within | Dr. Charles Cook | TV movie | |
| 2001 | L'Or | Vlad Kovak | TV miniseries. French-Canadian original title: L'Or ("Gold" in English) | |
| 2001 | After Amy | Dr. Dennis Griffiths | TV movie | |
| 2002 | Obsessed | Psychiatrist | TV movie | |
| 2002 | Matthew Blackheart: Monster Smasher | Franklin D. Roosevelt | TV movie | |
| 2002 | Redeemer | Edward Chase | TV movie | |
| 1999, 2002 | Big Wolf on Campus | Professor Flugelhoff / King Augustus | 2 episodes | |
| 2002 | Just a Walk in the Park | Publisher | TV movie | |
| 2002 | Scent of Danger | Dr. York | TV movie | |
| 2003 | Rudy: The Rudy Giuliani Story | Ray Harding | TV movie | |
| 2003 | Bad Apple | Fleisig | TV movie | |
| 2004 | Baby for Sale | Unknown | TV movie | |
| 2004 | When Angels Come to Town | Franz | TV movie | |
| 2004 | Life and Times, John Paul II | (voice) | Documentary video | |
| 2005 | The Tournament | Coach Jenkins | 3 episodes | |
| 2005 | Crimes of Passion | Malcolm McBradden | TV movie | |
| 2005 | Human Trafficking | Tommy | TV miniseries | |
| 2005 | Canadian Case Files | Narrator | 6 episodes | |
| 2007 | A Life Interrupted | Committee Chairman | TV movie | |
| 2007 | I Me Wed | Roy | TV movie | |
| 2007 | Race to Mars | Space Agency Narrator (voice) | TV miniseries | |
| 2008 | Dr. Jekyll and Mr. Hyde | Judge Shoehan | TV movie | |
| 2008 | Lava Storm | Mike Wilson | TV movie | |
| 2008 | The Cutting Edge: Chasing the Dream | Official | TV movie | |
| 2008 | The Christmas Choir | Unknown | TV movie | |
| 2009 | Carny | Pastor Owen | TV movie | |
| 2009 | The Last Templar | Taxi Driver | 2 episodes | |
| 2010 | The Cutting Edge: Fire and Ice | Maitre D' | TV movie | |
| 2015 | Northpole: Open for Christmas | Salvation Army Santa | TV movie | |
| 2014–2016 | 19-2 | Ben's Father | 11 episodes | |
| 2018 | Les Misérables | Voice Director | TV miniseries | |
| 2020 | Swept Up by Christmas | Alan Hawthorne | TV movie | |
| 2020 | Transplant | Walter Monroe | 1 episode | |

=== Voice roles ===
==== Canada Vignettes ====
Canada Vignettes short film voice roles and documentaries narrated by Vlast include the following, among others.

- Strangers at the Door (1977) as Jan
- Back Alley Blue (1977)
- No Fighting Habitat (1979) as Narrator
- Meet the Martians (1979) as Narrator
- Atmos (1980) as Narrator
- End Game in Paris (1982)
- The Forbes Home (1983) as Narrator
- The World Turned Upside Down (1985) as Narrator
- One Step Away (1985)
- Age of the Rivers (1986) as Narrator
- The Lonely Passion of Brian Moore (1986) as Narrator
- Great Collections from the Montreal Botanical Garden (1986) as Narrator
- Life on Ice (1986) as Narrator
- A Safety Net' (1987) as Narrator
- Dreams of a Land (1987) as Narrator
- Arctic River (1987) as Narrator
- Equatorial River (1987) Narrator
- The Man Who Stole Dreams (1987) as Narrator
- Edge of Ice (1988) as Narrator
- On Strike: The Winnipeg General Strike, 1919 (1991) as Narrator
- The Rise and Fall of English Montreal (1993) as Narrator
- To a Different Beat (1998) as Narrator

==== Television ====
Vlasta Vrána television voice credits
| Year | Title | Role | Notes | Ref. |
|---|---|---|---|---|
| 1981–1982 | Ulysses 31 | Zeus | 12 episodes | |
| 1981 | Astro Boy | Cinelume (voice) | English dub | |
| 1981 | Belle and Sebastian | (voice) | English dub | |
| 1982–1983 | The Mysterious Cities of Gold | Narrator / Kokapelt (voice) | 39 episodes. English dub | |
| 1984 | The Adventures of the Little Koala | Weather (voice) | | |
| 1985 | The World of David the Gnome | Swift (voice) | 1 episode. English dub | |
| 1985 | Bumpety Boo | (voice) | | |
| 1986–1987 | The Wonderful Wizard of Oz | (voice) | | |
| 1989 | Saban's Adventures of Peter Pan | (voice) | | |
| 1990 | The Real Story of... | The King (voice) | Episode: "Humpty Dumpty" | |
| 1991 | Saban's Adventures of the Little Mermaid | (voice) | | |
| 1991 | Bob in a Bottle | (voice) | | |
| 1991 | Saban's Adventures of Pinocchio | (voice) | | |
| 1992 | Sharky and George | (voice) | | |
| 1992 | A Bunch of Munsch | (voice) | 1 episode | |
| 1992 | The Legend of White Fang | (voice) | 1 episode | |
| 1993 | Christopher Columbus | (voice) | | |
| 1993 | Spirou et Fantasio | (voice) | | |
| 1993 | The Adventures of Grady Greenspace | Rafia Rat | | |
| 1993 | Around the World in 80 Dreams | (voice) | | |
| 1993–1996 | The Busy World of Richard Scarry | (voice) | 31 episodes | |
| 1994 | Papa Beaver's Storytime | (voice) | | |
| 1996 | The Magical Adventures of Quasimodo | Frollo / Prison Guard | 27 episodes | |
| 1997 | Night Hood | (voice) | | |
| 1997 | The Little Lulu Show | (voice) | | |
| 1997 | Princess Sissi | (voice) | | |
| 1998 | Team S.O.S. | (voice) | | |
| 1998 | Flight Squad | (voice) | | |
| 1998 | Dog's World | (voice) | | |
| 1998 | Animal Crackers | (voice) | | |
| 1998 | The Country Mouse and the City Mouse Adventures | (voice) | | |
| 1999 | Ripley's Believe It or Not!: The Animated Series | (voice) | | |
| 1999 | Billy and Buddy | (voice) | | |
| 1999 | Bizby | (voice) | | |
| 1999 | Turtle Island | (voice) | | |
| 2000–2002 | Wunschpunsch | Maledictus Maggot (voice) | 37 episodes. English version | |
| 2001 | Iron Nose | (voice) | | |
| 2001 | Wombat City | (voice) | | |
| 2001 | Belphegor | (voice) | | |
| 2002 | Pig City | (voice) | | |
| 2001–2003 | Lucky Luke | Joe Dalton (voice) | 4 episodes | |
| 2004 | Tripping the Rift | (voice) | 1 episode | |
| 2004 | Ocean Tales | (voice) | | |
| 2004 | The Three Pigs | (voice) | | |
| 2004 | Ratz | (voice) | | |
| 2004 | Winx Club | (voice) | English dub | |
| 2004 | Dragon Hunters | (voice) | | |
| 2004 | The Boy | (voice) | | |
| 2006 | My Goldfish is Evil | (voice) | | |

==== Video games ====
- Jagged Alliance: Deadly Games (1996)
- Tom Clancy's Splinter Cell (2002)
- Deus Ex: Human Revolution (2011) as Detective Chase
- Assassin's Creed: Revelations (2011) as Manuel Palailogos
- Far Cry 3: Blood Dragon (2013) as Introductory Narrator
- Deus Ex: Mankind Divided (2016) as Otar Botkoveli
