= Hollow Point =

1996 film by Sidney J. Furie

- Directed by: Sidney J. Furie
- Written by: Robert Geoffrion; Stewart Harding
- Starring: Thomas Ian Griffith; Tia Carrere; John Lithgow; Donald Sutherland
- Cinematography: David Franco
- Edited by: Yves Langlois
- Music by: Brahm Wenger
- Production companies: Phoenician Entertainment; Filmline International; Astral Programming Enterprises
- Distributed by: Vidmark Entertainment (U.S.); Astral Video (Canada)
- Release dates: July 22, 1996 (U.S.); June 29, 1996 (Canada)
- Running time: 102 minutes
- Countries: United States; Canada
- Language: English
- Budget: CAD$9.5 million

Hollow Point is a 1996 Canadian-American action thriller film directed by Sidney J. Furie and starring Thomas Ian Griffith, Tia Carrere, John Lithgow and Donald Sutherland. In this darkly comedic tale, Griffith and Carrere star as members of rival law enforcement agencies, who are both after a group of criminals connected by their cynical accountant (Lithgow) and their former hitman (Sutherland).

Sometimes considered to be the best of Furie's late career, the film was tarnished by the accidental death of a crew member during a botched pyrotechnics sequence.

== Plot ==
FBI agent Diane Norwood and DEA agent Max Parrish are both in pursuit of the same criminals—a trio of allied crime bosses and a man named Thomas Livingston, who handles their finances. But, instead of working together, the two agents race to be the first to arrest the suspects and seize their millions in order to claim the money for their agency. After realizing neither one can be beaten or persuaded off the case, the agents reluctantly decide to work together.

Despite a great deal of romantic tension, their strong personalities and different investigative techniques frequently clash; Diane, who is thoughtful, serious and by-the-book, is frustrated by Max's cocky, reckless nature and flippant sense of humor. Eventually, they discover and must team up with an eccentric assassin, Garrett Lawton, who works with Livingston and is their only link to resolving the case.

== Cast ==
- Thomas Ian Griffith as Max Parrish
- Tia Carrere as Diane Norwood
- John Lithgow as Thomas Livingston
- Donald Sutherland as Garrett Lawton
- David Hemblen as Oleg Krezinsky
- Carl Alacchi as Alberto Capucci
- Robert Ito as Shin Chan
- Andreas Apergis as Ivan Krezinsky
- Lisa Bronwyn Moore as Vicky, Diane's Friend
- Kliment Denchev as Patriarch

== Production ==
=== Development ===
Hollow Point was the first in a series of mid 1990s to early 2000s projects partnering Los Angeles producer Elie Samaha of Phoenician Entertainment with Montreal-based Nicolas Clermont of Filmline International. The picture had a budget of CAD$9.5 million. It was backed by Astral Communications, a Montreal-based media conglomerate which was ramping up its investment in movie production at the time. While Telefilm Canada did not contribute, the film benefited from other incentives such as tax breaks from Quebec film fund SODEC. Tia Carrere had recently starred in The Immortals for Samaha, to whom she was married. Donald Sutherland was a regular collaborator of Clermont's and appeared in many of his 1990s films, despite initially not getting along on the embattled biopic Béthune. This was part of a series of shorter roles—it only required a single week—that John Lithgow took at the time, due to the scheduling demands of his TV series 3rd Rock from the Sun.

=== Filming ===
Photography started on April 20, 1995, and was planned for about seven weeks with a wrap on May 30. Virtually all of the film was shot in Montreal, though some B-roll of Boston's downtown—where the story is set—was used in the opening sequence. Locations include sections of Old Montreal and parts of the West Island, including the Beaconsfield Golf Club. One location did have ties to Massachusetts: the Longueuil diner shown in the film had been moved there from Palmer by a local entrepreneur. Despite the project's relatively modest stature, Sutherland was highly involved in his work and objected to the look of a set representing his character's lair. Although only other actors were seen there, and Sutherland himself did not use it, he insisted that it did not fit his portrayal. Furie agreed to accommodate him and a new one was built. This did not help the director's standing with Clermont, who did not hold him in high regard.

=== Accident ===
On May 10, 1995, during the filming of a car crash on Rachel Street near the former Angus factory, a 60 cm × 30 cm (1.97 ft × 0.98 ft) piece of metal welded under the vehicle to hold an explosive charge was torn apart and struck grips Christian Sauvageau and Jean-François Bourassa. Sauvageau suffered an open arm fracture, but Bourassa died on his way to the hospital. It was believed to be the first death caused by filming in Canada. The rigging was overseen by Productions de l'intrigue, the company of Quebec film veteran Louis Craig. Producer Nicolas Clermont argued that he could have done nothing differently, with a report mentioning two ambulances, two firetrucks and four paramedics on site. Quebec's film technicians union acknowledged the safety measures taken by the production, but decried the lack of strict regulations for such setpieces in the province, with the CBA only mentioning that every effort must be made to protect the crew. Filming resumed after a five-day break, and was extended to mid-June.

Montreal Urban Community Police quickly concluded to the absence of criminal negligence. However, a report by Quebec's Work, Health and Safety Board later determined that the piece of metal had not been soldered strongly enough relative to the large amount of black powder (680 grams or 24 oz) used in the explosion, while the 28 m (92 ft) safety distance was insufficient. A witness claimed that the effects team had tested the explosives earlier in the day, but were not satisfied with the blast, which a production executive denied.

== Release ==
=== Pre-release ===
Around the 1995 Cannes Film Market, it was announced that the film had been picked up for international sales by Nu Image, who had a working relationship with Samaha at the time, including on The Immortals. Despite not featuring any fantasy elements, the film was showcased at the Brussels International Fantastic Film Festival held between March 8 and March 28, 1996.

=== Television ===
In the U.S., the film premiered on premium cable channel HBO on June 22, 1996, as part of the channel's "HBO World Premiere" line-up. In Canada, the film premiered on premium cable channel The Movie Network on June 29, 1996.

=== Home video ===
The filmed arrived on both Canadian and U.S. VHS on October 22, 1996. As with other films represented by Nu Image at the time, it was distributed in the U.S.by Vidmark Entertainment. In Canada, it was distributed by Astral Video, whose parent company backed the film.

== Reception ==
Hollow Point has received mixed to moderately positive reviews. Joe Leydon of trade magazine Variety called it "a modestly entertaining opus that tries to inject a Moonlighting style of levity into a routine action-adventure plot. Leads Thomas Ian Griffith and Tia Carrere evidence a potent sexual chemistry and develop a nicely edgy give-and-take". Of Furie's direction, he said that he was "much too fond of igniting explosions whenever the pace flags. Otherwise, he does an adequate job of keeping things moving and amusing." Writing for sister publications TV Guide and The Motion Picture Annual, Robert Pardi assessed: "Lacking subtle direction, the film can’t move past its over-plotted back-stabbings. At times the nasty comic edge becomes oppressive, as if the director felt the need to oversell the punch line. But thanks to clever one-liners and Lithgow’s and Sutherland’s puckish performances, Hollow Point entertains as often as it exasperates."

Ballantine Books' Video Movie Guide found that "action hero Thomas Ian Griffith abandons his usual 'style' and plays this explosive shoot-'em-up strictly for cartoon-style laughs. Unfortunately, neither Griffith nor costar Tia Carrere can manage the proper tongue-in cheek tone; both are overshadowed by costar Donald Sutherland, who steals the film as an assassin with principles." The BBC's RadioTimes noted that "[Furie's] camera trickery and Griffith’s gun-toting prowess are overshadowed by the two more accomplished members of the cast". Blockbuster Entertainment Guide to Movies and Videos deemed it "feebly amusing" but "[a] tiny step up from Griffith’s previous films. Lots of things go bang." Gerald Pratley, author of the book A Century of Canadian Cinema deemed it "[a] routine action-adventure", but acknowledged that "[t]he actors play this out with a confidence that makes the whole [movie] seem better than it is." Sidney J. Furie's biographer Daniel Kremer called the film "by far the most successful entry" in his late career series of independent genre films, "an unexpectedly brilliant piece of work and the Furie film of that decade with the most perceptibly customized directorial style."

=== Aftermath ===
The film was dedicated to Bourassa's memory. Shortly after his death, it was announced that a scholarship would be named in his honor at Concordia University, where he had studied and played for the varsity football team.

In June 1996, a Montreal labor court judge sentenced Productions de l'intrigue to a CAD$7,500 fine for failure to adequately secure the blast zone. Soon after, Christian Sauvageau launched a lawsuit of his own against Productions de l'intrigue and Filmline International for $265,000. The outcome is unknown.

Soon after this film, Carrere and Sutherland co-starred in another Montreal-shot Samaha/Clermont co-production, Natural Enemy.
