= Rough Justice =

Rough Justice may refer to:

- Vigilante

== Books ==
- Rough Justice, novel in the Rosato & Associates series
- Rough Justice (novel), a 2008 novel by Jack Higgins

== Film and TV ==
- Rough Justice (film), a 1970 film starring Klaus Kinski
- Rough Justice (Belgian TV series), a 2016 Belgian television series shown on Walter Presents in both the UK and US
- Rough Justice (UK TV programme), a 1982–2007 British television programme which investigated alleged miscarriages of justice that was broadcast on BBC
- "Rough Justice" (Bad Girls), a 2000 television episode
- "Rough Justice" (Porridge), a 1977 television episode
- "Rough Justice" (Suspects), a 2015 television episode

== Music ==
- "Rough Justice" (Bananarama song), 1984
- "Rough Justice" (Rolling Stones song), 2005
- "Rough Justice", a song by Bloc Party from Alpha Games, 2022
