= Tom Rack =

Canadian actor and writer

- Occupations: Actor, voice actor, writer
- Years active: 1983-2010

Tom Rack is a Canadian actor and writer best known for his portrayal of henchman Zigesfeld in the 1991 film If Looks Could Kill, and for twice portraying physicist Dr.Robert Oppenheimer.

== Career ==
A character actor with an impactful presence, Rack has worked extensively in film, television and on stage.

He began his career on stage in Montreal, at the Saidye Bronfman Centre for the Arts before appearing at the Phoenix Theatre, Laurentian Theatre, Théâtre du Rideau Vert and Centaur.

Many of his formative years as an actor were spent working with the National Film Board of Canada doing voice-over work for short films. Among his first feature film roles was Dr. Meister in The Blue Man in 1985 and Faulkner in Toby McTeague in 1986, both films which were nominated for two Genie Awards. His best known role came in 1991, when he played the villain Zigesfeld in the James Bond spoof If Looks Could Kill starring Richard Grieco. He has portrayed Doctor Robert Oppenheimer on screen twice, in the 1987 mini-series Race for the Bomb and in the 1996 TV movie Einstein: Light to the Power of 2. In 2003, he had a supporting role as the leading character's father in Chasing Holden, starring DJ Qualls. Other notable roles include Mirak in the 1996 TV movie Ivana Trump's For Love Alone and Brother Abel, a psychotic priest in the 2002 Sherlock Holmes television flick The Case of the Whitechapel Vampire. Rack also made brief appearances in the blockbuster films Jesus of Montreal, 300 and The Greatest Game Ever Played.

Rack has supplied voices for animation including Animal Crackers, The Country Mouse and the City Mouse Adventures, Billy and Buddy, Sea Dogs, Lucky Luke, Daft Planet, Princess Sissi, The Magical Adventures of Quasimodo, Arthur, Marsupilami, Ratz, Ivanhoe, Wunschpunsch, Ripley's Believe It or Not!, A Miss Mallard Mystery and Patrol 03. He wrote one episode of Nickelodeon's Are You Afraid of the Dark?, called "The Tale of the Pinball Wizard" in which he also played two characters, and in addition, he played The Watcher in the episode The Tale of Watcher's Woods.

Rack appeared as a contestant on Jeopardy! on September 27 and 28, 1993, amassing a total of $18,300 in winnings as a one-day champion. He lives in Montreal, Quebec.

== Filmography ==
=== Film ===
| Year | Title | Role | Notes |
|---|---|---|---|
| 1984 | The Bay Boy | Sol Silver | |
| 1985 | The Blue Man | Dr. Meister | |
| 1986 | The Vindicator | Truck Driver | |
| 1986 | Toby McTeague | Faulkner | |
| 1987 | Wild Thing | Braindrain | |
| 1989 | Jacknife | William Green | |
| 1989 | Jesus of Montreal | Doctor | |
| 1989 | Mindfield | Mick | |
| 1990 | Cursed | Sexton | |
| 1990 | Whispers | Dr. Rudge | |
| 1991 | If Looks Could Kill | Zigesfeld | |
| 1991 | Lola Zipper | Rostrovitch | |
| 1993 | Stalked | Dr. Bork | |
| 1997 | Strip Search | Locust | |
| 1998 | Provocateur | Kurt's Uncle | |
| 1998 | The Sleep Room | Dr. Weinrich | |
| 1998 | Free Money | Reverend Schmidt | |
| 1999 | The Long Winter | Marchand anglais | |
| 2001 | Xchange | Mr. Finerman | |
| 2003 | Chasing Holden | Governor Lawrence | |
| 2003 | Deception | Dr. Lewis | |
| 2003 | The Human Stain | Bobcat | |
| 2004 | A Different Loyalty | British Agent | |
| 2005 | The Greatest Game Ever Played | Black Top Hatted Man | |
| 2006 | 300 | Ephor #3 | |
| 2007 | Steel Toes | Magistrate | |

=== Television ===
| Year | Title | Role | Notes |
|---|---|---|---|
| 1984 | The Bay Boy | Sol Silver | |
| 1987 | Ford: The Man and the Machine | John Dodge | |
| 1987 | Race for the Bomb | Robert Oppenheimer | 2 episodes |
| 1991 | The Final Heist | Philippe Cameron | |
| 1992, 1994 | Are You Afraid of the Dark? | Pinball Wizard/Security Guard; Watcher | 2 episodes: "The Tale of the Pinball Wizard" (also writer) and "The Tale of Watcher's Woods" |
| 1993 | Vendetta II: The New Mafia | Vito | |
| 1995 | Young Ivanhoe | Edward | |
| 1995 | Hiroshima | Under Secretary of the Navy Ralph Bard | |
| 1996 | Ivana Trump's For Love Alone | Mirak | |
| 1996 | Einstein: Light to the Power of 2 | Dr. Robert Oppenheimer | |
| 1998 | Windsor Protocol | Dr. Harold Flegg | |
| 1998 | The Country Mouse and the City Mouse Adventures | Voices | 2 episodes: "Klondike Mice" and "Matador Mice" |
| 1999 | Ripley's Believe It or Not | Additional voices | 26 episodes |
| 2000 | Someone Is Watching | Mr. Walters | |
| 2000 | The Audrey Hepburn Story | Gilbert Miller | |
| 2000 | Nuremberg | Hans Fritzsche | 2 episodes |
| 2001 | Varian's War | Reinhold Neibuhr | |
| 2002 | The Case of the Whitechapel Vampire | Brother Abel | |
| 2003 | The Reagans | Elie Wiesel | |
| 2004 | Her Perfect Spouse | Dr. Schneider | |
| 2008 | A Teacher's Crime | Evan | |
