= Nicolas Clermont =

French film producer

Nicolas Clermont (1 January 1942-11 April 2001) was a French film producer. Born in Neuilly on New Year's Day 1942, He died on 11 April 2001 in Montreal. He was noted for his involvement in the Canadian film industry.

== Filmography ==
- Reckless and In Love, (1983)
- Eternal Evil, (executive, 1985)
- Toby McTeague, (1986)
- Wild Thing, (1987)
- Bethune: The Making of a Hero, (1990)
- The Sound and the Silence, (executive, 1991)
- A Christmas Story at the Vatican, (1991)
- Armen and Bullik, (1993)
- Bride of Violence 2, (1993)
- The Lifeforce Experiment, (1994)
- A Young Connecticut Yankee in King Arthur's Court, (1995)
- Young Ivanhoe, (1995)
- Rainbow, (1996)
- Hollow Point, (1996)
- Silent Trigger, (1996)
- Natural Enemy, (1996)
- Twists of Terror, (1997)
- The Peacekeeper, (1997)
- Monument Ave., (1998)
- Highlander: The Series, (1993-1998)
- This Is My Father, (1998)
- Free Money, (1998)
- Eye of the Beholder, (1999)
- The Art of War, (2000)
- The Secret Adventures of Jules Verne, (2000)
- The Caveman's Valentine, (2001)
