= Jean-François Delassus =

Jean-François Delassus (born 1942) is a French journalist and documentaries director. He has been working for France Inter and Europe 1 and was Far East correspondent for Le Figaro.

== Distinctions ==
- 1971: Prix Albert-Londres for Le Japon : Monstre ou modèle.

== Works ==
- Le Japon, Monstre ou modèle. On en parle. Hachette. 1970. p. 319.
- Les Plus belles lettres d'amour. JC Lattès. 1983.

== Documentaries ==
- 1977 – Foch pour vaincre
- 1978 – Lazare Carnot : le glaive de la révolution
- 1978 – La banqueroute de Law
- 1979 – Ann Dollwood
- 1979 – Bernard Quesnay
- 1981 – L'Âge d'aimer
- 1982 – Le pouvoir d'inertie
- 1987 – Race for the Bomb
- 1988 – L'Argent du mur
- 1989 – Lundi Noir
- 1992 – Fusion
- 1994 – La Bataille du riz
- 1994 – La bataille du charbon
- 1995 – Plus chaud que mille volcans
- 1995 – Nous irons tous à l'Elysée
- 1995 – Le Siège de la Rochelle : les grandes batailles du passé
- 1995 – Alsace-Vegas
- 1996 – Hitler Staline : liaisons dangereuses
- 1996 – Hoover, le plus grand ripou d'Amérique
- 1996 – Le Fils de l'ours
- 1999 – Les Mystères des pyramides
- 1999 – Les Hommes en noir
- 2000 – Une sacrée vacherie
- 2001 – Les Mystères des cathédrales
- 2002 – Mai 40 : Les Trente Jours du désastre
- 2002 – Au temps de l'Empire Romain
- 2003 – Au temps de Charlemagne
- 2003 – Au temps des croisades
- 2004 – Luther contre le pape
- 2004 – La Tempête du siècle : 26 décembre 1999 with Jacques Pessis
- 2005 – Dunkerque : la dernière forteresse d'Hitler
- 2006 – Austerlitz : la victoire en marchant
- 2006 – Les Derniers jours de Anouar el Sadat
- 2007 – Les Derniers jours de Marlon Brando
- 2008 – 14–18 : le bruit et la fureur
- 2008 – L'affaire Farewell
- 2009 – Les dernières heures du mur
- 2011 – Le Front populaire, à nous la vie
- 2015 – Délivrance. Noël 1944 – 8 mai 1945, une fin de guerre
