= Peter MacNeill =

Canadian actor

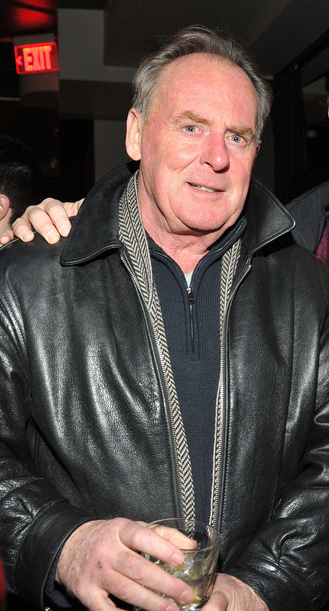
- MacNeill in 2011
- Born: New Brunswick, Canada
- Other names: Peter MacNeil; Peter Macneill
- Years active: 1973–present
- Awards: Genie Award for Best Performance by an Actor in a Supporting Role; 1997 The Hanging Garden Gemini Award for Best Performance by an Actor in a Supporting Role; 2003 The Eleventh Hour Gemini Award for Best Performance by an Actor in a Featured Supporting Role in a Dramatic Program or Mini-Series; 2008 Victor

Peter MacNeill is a Canadian film and television actor and voice-over artist who has starred in numerous television series and films.

His film credits have included The Hanging Garden (for which MacNeill won a Genie Award for Best Supporting Actor in 1997), Geraldine's Fortune, Crash, Dog Park, Open Range, A History of Violence, and Regression.

On television, he has had roles in Queer as Folk (as Carl Horvath), Katts and Dog (as Sgt. Callahan), Traders (as Frank Larkin), The Eleventh Hour (as Warren Donohue), PSI Factor: Chronicles of the Paranormal (as Ray Donahue) Call Me Fitz (as Ken Fitzpatrick), and The Good Witch series (as George O'Hanrahan). He is a two-time Gemini Award winner.

In January 2023, he was named the winner of the Academy of Canadian Cinema and Television's Earle Grey Award for lifetime achievement in acting at the 11th Canadian Screen Awards.

== Selected filmography ==
=== Film ===
Year	Title	Role	Notes
1974	Why Rock the Boat?	Peterson	
1976	Strange Shadows in an Empty Room	Llewelyn	
1977	Cathy's Curse	Christopher Gimble	
1977	Rabid	Cargo Loader	
1977	Spinnolio		Short film
1977	One Man	Jack Williamson	
1978	Blackout	Carter	
1981	Kings and Desperate Men	George	
1984	That's My Baby!	Donut Bum	
1986	A Judgement in Stone	William	
1989	Judge Denied	Harry Wheaton	
1989	Physical Evidence	Graham Brannigan	
1989	Renegades	Denny Random	
1990	Stella	Bobby	
1990	Whispers	Frank	
1991	Body Parts	Drunk Man	
1991	The Events Leading Up to My Death	Dad	
1995	Butterbox Babies	William Young	
1996	Crash	Colin Seagrave	
1997	The Hanging Garden	Whiskey Mac	Genie Award winning role
1998	Blind Faith	Captain Roy McCully	
1998	Simon Birch	Mr. Birch	
1998	Dog Park	Neighbour	
1999	Resurrection	Captain Whippley	
2000	Frequency	Butch Foster	
2000	Violet	Rusty	
2001	The Caveman's Valentine	Cork	
2001	Angel Eyes	Lt. Dennis Sanderman	
2001	Who Is Cletis Tout?	Detective Tripp	
2003	Open Range	Mack	
2003	Luck	Dad	
2004	Geraldine's Fortune	Harry Liddle	
2005	A History of Violence	Sheriff Sam Carney	
2005	Cinderella Man	Electric Man	
2006	The Marsh	Philip Manville	
2007	Talk to Me	Warden Cecil Smithers	
2007	Late Fragment	Christian	
2007	The Stone Angel	Jason Currie	
2007	The Secret	Dr. Christopher Bray	
2007	Kit Kittredge: An American Girl	The Sheriff	
2009	The Cry of the Owl	Sam Rhodes	
2009	Leslie, My Name Is Evil	The Judge	
2010	My Family's Secret	Paul Darcile	
2013	The Hunting Season	Jack	
2013	Tru Love	Richard	
2014	The Journey Home	Albert Speck	
2015	Let's Rap	Victor Brady	
2015	The Exorcism of Molly Hartley	Chaplain Henry Davies	
2015	Regression	Police Chief Cleveland	
2016	First Round Down	Coach	
2017	Away Home	John McNeil	Short film
2017	Cardinals	Jim Walker	
2018	An Audience of Chairs	Ian	
2019	She Never Died	Detective Godfrey	
2020	The Kid Detective	Principal Erwin	
2020	Life in a Year	James Maxwell	
2021	Nightmare Alley	Judge Kimball	

=== Television ===
Year	Title	Role	Notes
1984–1986	The Edison Twins	Mr. Edison	30 episodes
1985	Star Wars: Droids	Jord Dusat	10 episodes
1986	One Police Plaza	David Ancorie	Television film
1987–1988	Captain Power and the Soldiers of the Future	Maj. Matthew "Hawk" Masterson	22 episodes
1988–1989	Katts and Dog	Sgt. Callahan	44 episodes
1989–1991	Babar	Additional voices	65 episodes
1990–1992	E.N.G.	Richard/Fraser/Paul Richter/John Malik	4 episodes
1993	Road to Avonlea	Emmett Grier	1 episode
1994	Lives of Girls and Women	Tom Jordan	Television film
1996–1999	PSI Factor: Chronicles of the Paranormal	Ray Donahue	28 episodes
1998	The Long Island Incident	Dennis McCarthy	Television film
2001	Doc	Gus Wanson	2 episodes
2002–2004	The Eleventh Hour	Warren Donahue	4 episodes
2002–2005	Queer as Folk	Detective Carl Horvath	24 episodes
2005	Trump Unauthorized	Joseph Eichler	Television film
2008	Victor	Mel Davis	Television film
2008	Mayerthorpe	Superintendent	Television film
2010–2013	Call Me Fitz	Ken Fitzpatrick	Television film
2010–2015	Rookie Blue	Tommy McNally	6 episodes
2013	Defiance	Garret Clancy	3 episodes
2015	Rogue	General Howard	5 episodes
2015–2016	This Life	Gerald Lawson	20 episodes
2015–2017	Good Witch	George O'Hanrahan	18 episodes
2018	My Secret Valentine	Truman Grange	Television film
2018	Private Eyes	Murray Clavin	1 episode
2019	Titans	Lionel Luthor	1 episode
2021–2023	Moonshine	Ken Finley-Cullen	24 episodes

=== Video games ===
- Tom Clancy's Splinter Cell: Blacklist (2013) as Secretary of Defense

== Awards and nominations ==
- 1994 Gemini Award for Best Performance by an Actor in a Supporting Role: Gross Misconduct: The Life of Brian Spencer (nominated)
- 1997 Genie Award for Best Supporting Actor: The Hanging Garden (won)
- 1998 Gemini Award for Best Performance by an Actor in a Featured Supporting Role in a Dramatic Program of Miniseries: Giant Mine (nominated)
- 2003 Gemini Award for Best Performance by an Actor in a Supporting Role: The Eleventh Hour (won)
- 2008 Gemini Award for Best Performance by an Actor in a Featured Supporting Role in a Dramatic Program of Miniseries: Victor (won)
- 2011 Gemini Award Best Performance by an Actor in a Featured Supporting Role or Guest Role in a Comedic Series: Call Me Fitz (nominated)
- 2011 Gemini Award Best Ensemble Performance in a Comedy Program or Series: Call Me Fitz (nominated)
- 2015 Canadian Screen Award for Best Performance by an Actor in a Featured Supporting Role or Guest Role in a Comedic Series: Call Me Fitz (nominated)
