= Whispers (1990 film) =

- Theatrical release poster
- Directed by: Douglas Jackson
- Screenplay by: Anita Doohan
- Based on: Whispers by Dean Koontz
- Produced by: Don Carmody; John Dunning
- Starring: Victoria Tennant; Jean LeClerc; Chris Sarandon; Peter MacNeill; Linda Sorenson
- Cinematography: Peter Benison
- Edited by: Jacques Jean
- Music by: Fred Mollin
- Production companies: Cinépix Film Properties; ITC Entertainment
- Distributed by: C/FP Distribution
- Release date: December 7, 1990
- Running time: 93 minutes (Note: The film's running time varies between sources: The 1991 LIVE Video VHS release lists a running time of 96 minutes, while the LaserDisc lists a running time of 94 minutes. Alternately, the DVD released by Scorpion Releasing in 2012 lists a running time of 90 minutes. However, prints of the film available for streaming run approximately 93 minutes, a running time which is corroborated by Turner Classic Movies.)
- Country: Canada
- Language: English
- Budget: CA$2.4 million

Whispers is a 1990 Canadian horror film directed by Douglas Jackson and starring Victoria Tennant, Jean LeClerc, Chris Sarandon, Peter MacNeill, and Linda Sorenson. It follows a writer who, after killing her stalker, finds that he seems to have returned from beyond the grave. It is based on the 1980 novel by American suspense author Dean Koontz.

Whispers was co-produced by John Dunning for Cinépix Film Properties, and filmed on location in Quebec in the fall of 1989. It was distributed by Dunning's C/FP Distribution, who released it theatrically at 20 cinemas in Canada on December 7, 1990. The film was released direct-to-video in the United States by LIVE Entertainment in January 1991.

== Plot ==
Writer Hilary Thomas is being pursued by psychopath Bruno Clavel, a man she once interviewed at his family's Massachusetts orchard while researching for a book. Clavel plays a cat-and-mouse game with Hilary, repeatedly breaking into her Manhattan apartment and tormenting her, often calling her "Catherine." Detective Tony Clemenza oversees the case, while Hilary struggles to find an explanation for why Clavel is targeting her. During one of the break-ins, Clavel is fatally injured, and found dead several blocks from Hilary's apartment. Hilary is brought to the morgue to positively identify his body. Clavel's corpse is sent to his Massachusetts hometown, where it is swiftly buried by Clavel's stepfather, Jonathan Rinehart.

Meanwhile, Hilary and Tony begin a romance. One night, after having sex, Tony leaves the apartment to get the couple dinner. While taking a bath, Hilary is mortified when Clavel appears, referring to her as a vampire and threatening to stab her through the heart. Tony arrives moments after Clavel vanishes. Determined to solve the mystery, Hilary and Tony visit the funeral home for confirmation of Clavel's death, where they learn from the mortician that Clavel was quickly buried unembalmed at the insistence of his stepfather Jonathan. Upon further investigation, they learn that Clavel withdrew funds two days after his supposed death, and was seen by a bank teller who knew him. Clavel's check register shows he made repeated payments to a small number of people, including a local bookseller and an elderly woman, Mrs. Yancey. Police agree to exhume Clavel's grave, only to find his casket empty aside from several bags of concrete.

Hilary's literary agent, Kayla, is subsequently stalked by Clavel, who accosts her in her home, demanding to know Hilary's whereabouts before stabbing her to death. Meanwhile, Hilary and Tony continue to meet with several individuals to gather information, including Clavel's psychologist, who recounts his disturbed state of mind: Clavel believed himself damned to hell by his mother Catherine, an occultist, and claimed Catherine continued to live on by possessing others' bodies after her death.

Clavel returns to his childhood home, where he confronts Jonathan, and kills him. Meanwhile, Hilary and Tony visit the bookstore frequented by Clavel, and ask the shop owner several questions about him. The shop owner, who professes himself to be a Satanist, claims that Clavel may be possessed. Next, Hilary and Tony visit Mrs. Yancey, a former bordello madam who once rented a room to Clavel's mother, Catherine. Mrs. Yancey explains that Catherine, after falling pregnant, concocted a story about how she was going to adopt her friend's child. However, she gave birth to twin sons, forcing her to keep one of the boys a secret. She forced both boys to act as one child, and would not allow them to be seen together. Furthermore, she carried on an incestuous relationship with the "secondary" son, whom she kept locked in the cellar. For her secrecy, Catherine—and, later, Clavel—continued to pay Mrs. Yancey each month. Meanwhile, at the Clavel mansion, Clavel erotically caresses and kisses the corpse of his twin, whose body he has grave-robbed.

Armed with the knowledge that there are two identical "Bruno Clavels", Hilary and Tony go to visit the Clavel mansion. Inside, Hilary notices a portrait of Catherine, who bears a striking resemblance to herself—she realizes that the original Clavel brother she met had stalked her due to her likeness to his mother, and his hope that he might resurrect Catherine in her body; the other Clavel brother, who had been kept locked away for most of his life, envisions Hilary as a manifestation of his mother, and wishes to kill her to avenge his own abuse.

In the house, Tony is attacked by the living Clavel brother upstairs, and Hilary finds Jonathan's corpse impaled on a fence outside. Clavel confronts her in the backyard, and chases her into the cellar, but he is fatally injured with his own knife after Hilary pushes him down the stairs. As he writhes on the floor, dying, a swarm of beetles cover his body. Hilary and Tony assume him dead until he rises out of the cellar, after which Tony shoots him to death.

== Cast ==
- Victoria Tennant as Hilary Thomas
- Jean Leclerc as Bruno Clavel
- Chris Sarandon as Tony Clemenza
- Linda Sorenson as Kayla
- Eric Christmas as Jonathan Rinehart
- Keith Knight as Avril
- Jackie Burroughs as Mrs. Yancey
- Tom Rack as Dr. Rudge
- Vlasta Vrana as Sheriff
- Linda Singer as Prostitute
- Walter Massey as Bank Manager
- Richard Jutras as Locksmith
- Peter MacNeill as Frank

== Production ==
=== Development ===
Whispers was adapted from the 1980 novel of the same name by Dean Koontz. The rights to Koontz's novel had been purchased by Canadian producer John Dunning shortly after its original publication, before Koontz had gained international fame. According to Dunning, he paid approximately US$35,000 for the rights. Several years later, after Koontz had become an established writer, he asked to purchase the rights back for approximately $100,000. This spurred Dunning to produce the film, and he declined Koontz's offer.

Dunning hired established television director Douglas Jackson to direct the project.

=== Casting ===
Actress Victoria Tennant was cast in the lead role of Hilary, while Chris Sarandon was given the role of Tony, the detective attempting to help her. For the dual villain role of Bruno Clavel, the production cast Montreal-based actor Jean Leclerc, who at that time had earned fame for his appearances on several American soap operas.

=== Filming ===
The film was shot between October and November 7, 1989 in Montréal, Québec on a budget of CA$2.4 million. Some interior sequences were filmed in the apartment of a film journalist who wrote for the publication La Presse Serge Dussault.

For the film's final sequence in which the antagonist, Bruno Clavel, is covered by beetles in the cellar of his home, the production had to import live beetles from North Carolina. Because they were allowed a limited supply of the insects, the art department had to create fake plastic models, which were interspersed with the actual beetles.

== Release ==
Whispers was given a theatrical release in Canada on December 7, 1990, showing in twenty Canadian cinemas. The film was one of the few to be restricted to audiences eighteen years of age and older by the Régie du cinéma du Québec. The French-dubbed version of the film was released under the French title Rauge.

It was released direct-to-video in the United States in January 1991. It was subsequently shown on television in the United States in March 1991. The film also received a direct-to-video release in the United Kingdom in August 1991.

In Australia, the film was given a theatrical release on November 15, 1991.

=== Home media ===
In the United States, LIVE Video released the film on VHS and LaserDisc on January 11, 1991.

Scorpion Releasing issued a DVD of the film in February 2012.

== Reception ==
=== Critical response ===
Marc Horton of the Edmonton Journal panned the film, giving it zero stars and describing it as "a thoroughly awful movie with bad direction, bad plotting, bad directing, bad acting and bad cinematography. Fred Haeseker of the Calgary Herald felt the film was lackluster, writing: "In Whispers, a baroque story line is married to a plodding pace and wooden acting. Any suspense that does develop from time to time—as if by accident—is derailed long before it can build up enough to become effective.

The Abbotsford News's John Wesley Ireland awarded the film one out of five stars, writing that "Fear may shout and terror may whisper, but unfortunate patrons stuck in this hound will just snore," adding that Tennant "sleepwalks through her role." Steven Mazey of the Ottawa Citizen likened the film to the "cheap tax shelter disasters" produced in Canada the previous decade, deeming the direction inept and the screenplay "full of unbelievably bad TV drama dialogue."

Critic Leonard Maltin called the film a "routine, predictable thriller," but praised LeClerc's performance as "amusingly loony." John Stanley, writing in the Creature Features Movie Guide, praised the film as an "unusually good adaptation... all cleverly arranged by writer Anita Doohan and carefully shot by director Douglas Jackson. The film also has an unusual homosexual touch, which we cannot elaborate on without giving away the ending."

In a 2021 retrospective on Koontz adaptations for Screen Rant, Cathal Gunning summarized: "Unfortunately, this toothless 1990 movie adaptation fails to capture the novel’s creepy intensity. The story of a woman repeatedly targeted by a supposedly dead killer, Whispers boasts a killer premise and a stellar supporting co-star in Fright Night's Chris Sarandon. Despite this pedigree, there’s not much to recommend about this forgettable slasher."

== Sources ==
- Dunning, John; Brownstein, Bill (2014). You're Not Dead Until You're Forgotten: A Memoir. Montreal, Quebec: McGill-Queen's Press. ISBN 978-0-773-59609-2.
- Easterbrook, Ian K.; MacLean, Susan Waterman, eds. (1996). Canada and Canadians in Feature Films: A Filmography, 1928-1990. Guelph, Ontario: University of Guelph. ISBN 978-0-88955-415-3.
- Goble, Alan (2011). The Complete Index to Literary Sources in Film. Boston, Massachusetts: Walter de Gruyter. ISBN 978-3-11-095194-3.
- Kipen, David M., ed. (1996). Film Producers, Studios, Agents, and Casting Directors Guide (5th ed.). Los Angeles, California: Lone Eagle Pub. Co. ISBN 978-0-943-72882-7.
- Maltin, Leonard (1998). Leonard Maltin's Movie & Video Guide. New York City, New York: Penguin. ISBN 978-0-452-27992-6.
- Munster, Bill (1998). Discovering Dean Koontz: Essays on America's Bestselling Writer of Suspense and Horror Fiction. San Bernardino, California: Wildside Press. ISBN 978-1-55742-145-6.
- Stanley, John (1994). The Creature Features Movie Guide Strikes Again (Fourth ed.). Pacifica, California: Creatures at Large Press. ISBN 978-0-940-06409-6.
