= Sean Dillon (character) =

Novel character by Jack Higgins

- First appearance: Eye of the Storm
- Last appearance: The Midnight Bell
- Created by: Jack Higgins
- Portrayed by: Rob Lowe in 2 films; Kyle MacLachlan in 2 films

In-universe information
- Gender: Male
- Occupation: Assassin, mercenary, spy
- Nationality: Irish

Sean Dillon is a fictional Irish character who is the hero of a series of Jack Higgins novels.

== Fictional biography ==
Sean Dillon is described in Higgins' works as a short, fair-haired man. Born in Northern Ireland in 1952, he initially aspires to be an actor until his father is killed in the crossfire of a Belfast gunfight between the Provisional Irish Republican Army (IRA) and British Army. Seeking revenge for his father's death, Dillon joins the IRA, where he becomes a protégé of Liam Devlin. He is taught several things by Devlin, including the 'eerie dog-whistle'.

An excellent gunman and a good actor, he very soon earns the nickname "The Man of 1000 Faces" from the British authorities for his ability to evade detection. He is noted for his part in the Downing Street bomb blast, which fails to kill or injure anyone. His disapproval of the IRA's indiscriminate attacks on innocent civilians prompts him to abandon the cause and offer himself out as a mercenary for hire, working indiscriminately for the Palestine Liberation Organization, Israel, the Red Brigades and even the KGB. Although the British government makes several attempts to capture him, all are unsuccessful. For more than 20 years the elusive and resourceful Dillon—who shunned the publicity favoured by other terrorists—slipped through the fingers of the authorities on every continent. He is finally caught by the Serbs while running medicine for children into Bosnia.

It is revealed that the shipment contained Stinger missiles without his knowledge, and he is sentenced to death. Dillon is plucked out of prison by Brigadier Charles Ferguson of the elite MI6 antiterrorist unit Group 4, who offers him a clean slate in exchange for his services. Soon after joining Group 4, it is revealed that Dillon's capture by the Serbs was actually set up by Ferguson. Dillon — an expert pilot and scuba diver as well as a master of disguise and languages — subsequently becomes Ferguson's most effective agent, at one point even foiling an assassination attempt upon the prime minister of the United Kingdom and the president of the United States. Dillon soon meets Ferguson's right-hand woman Hannah Bernstein, and is slightly romantically inclined towards her. He also befriends the President's right-hand man, Blake Johnson, and famous London gangsters Harry Salter and his nephew Billy Salter.

== Tastes ==
Dillon's favourite handgun is a Walther PPK with Carswell silencer and his favourite rifle is an AK-47. His preferred explosive is Semtex. His favorite 'hide-out' gun is a .25 Colt strapped to his ankle.

Dillon's drink of choice is non-vintage Krug champagne, due to the grape mix, and his second drink of choice is Bushmills Irish whiskey.

== Appearances ==
- Eye of the Storm (1992)
- Thunder Point (1993)
- On Dangerous Ground (1994)
- Angel of Death (1995)
- Drink with the Devil (1996)
- The President's Daughter (1997)
- The White House Connection (1999)
- Day of Reckoning (2000)
- Edge of Danger (2001)
- Midnight Runner (2002)
- Bad Company (2003)
- Dark Justice (2004)
- Without Mercy (2005)
- The Killing Ground (2007)
- Rough Justice (2008)
- A Darker Place (2009)
- Wolf at the Door (2009)
- The Judas Gate (2010)
- A Devil Is Waiting (2012)
- The Death Trade (2013)
- Rain on the Dead (2014)
- The Midnight Bell (2017)

== In other media ==
=== Television films ===
- Sean Dillon was portrayed by Rob Lowe in On Dangerous Ground (1996) and Midnight Man (1997).
- He was portrayed by Kyle MacLachlan in Windsor Protocol (1997) and Thunder Point (1998).
