= Peter Cureton =

Canadian actor and playwright

- Born: November 1, 1965; Ottawa, Ontario
- Died: March 2, 1994 (aged 28); Ottawa
- Occupations: Actor, playwright
- Writing career
- Notable work: Passages

Peter Cureton (November 1, 1965 – March 2, 1994) was a Canadian actor and playwright. He was best known for his 1993 play Passages, an autobiographical show about living with HIV/AIDS.

Born and raised in Ottawa, Ontario, Cureton was a cousin of actor R. H. Thomson. He attended high school at Lisgar Collegiate Institute, and later studied drama at Concordia University. He acted in theatre roles in both Ottawa and Montreal, including productions of Agatha Christie's The Mousetrap, Jack Todd's The Day Luzinski Stole Home and William Mastrosimone's Shivaree, participated in Montreal's first bilingual theatresports competition, and appeared in the television film The Boys of St. Vincent as Brother Peter.

Diagnosed HIV-positive in 1988 while acting in The Mousetrap, he also worked as an HIV educator.

Passages premiered in Montreal in 1993, with Cureton as the director of the inaugural production. The cast included Joe de Paul, Susan Glover, Lisa Bronwyn Moore, Patrick Brosseau and Pauline Little. The play was favourably reviewed, with Montreal Gazette theatre critic Pat Donnelly writing that "it should be a kickoff, not a swan song".

Cureton died on March 2, 1994, aged 28, at his family's home in Ottawa, while working on a planned production of Passages in Toronto.
