= Race for the Bomb =

1987 television miniseries

Race for the Bomb (French: La Course à la bombe) is a 1987 three-part television miniseries about the Manhattan Project, starting from the initial stages of scientific discovery that led to the creation of the atomic bomb, discovery of the Ulam-Teller thermonuclear weapons design and ending with the beginning of the arms race. The series was directed by Allan Eastman and Jean-François Delassus.

The production was a joint production of a Canadian firm, Ronald Cohen Productions, a French firm, Société Philippe Dussart and Jadran Film of Zagreb (former Yugoslavia). In Canada the series aired on both CBC Television in English and Télévision de Radio-Canada in French, while in France it aired on TF1. A lot of collateral roles have been performed by actors from the former Yugoslavia.

The series covers the development of many aspects related to the origin of the bomb, such as scientific, political, and personal. It stars Tom Rack as Robert Oppenheimer, Maury Chaykin as Leslie Groves, Miki Manojlović as Edward Teller, Jean-Paul Muel as Leo Szilard, Michael Ironside as Werner Heisenberg, Géza Kovács as Otto Frisch, Jean-Claude Deret as Niels Bohr, Denis Forest as Klaus Fuchs, Peter Dvorsky as Ernest Lawrence, Leslie Nielsen as Lewis Strauss and Barry Morse as Secretary of State Henry Stimson.

Muel received a Gemini Award nomination for Best Actor in a Drama Program at the 2nd Gemini Awards, and the French version was a Prix Gémeaux nominee for Best Miniseries.
