= Strange Shadows in an Empty Room =

- Directed by: Alberto De Martino
- Screenplay by: Vincenzo Mannino; Gianfranco Clerici
- Story by: Vincenzo Mannino; Gianfranco Clerici
- Produced by: Edmondo Amati
- Starring: Stuart Whitman; John Saxon; Martin Landau; Tisa Farrow; Carole Laure; Jean LeClerc; Gayle Hunnicutt
- Cinematography: Aristide Massaccesi
- Edited by: Vincenzo Tomassi
- Music by: Armando Trovajoli
- Production companies: Security Investment Trust; Fida Cinematografica
- Distributed by: Fida
- Release date: March 9, 1976 (Italy)
- Running time: 99 minutes
- Countries: Italy; Panama

Strange Shadows in an Empty Room (Italian: Una magnum special per Tony Saitta) is a 1976 film starring Stuart Whitman as a tough Dirty Harry type who sets out to discover his sister's killer.

== Plot ==
Ottawa Police Department Captain Tony Saitta, a hardened street cop, learns that his sister Louise has died during a college party in Montreal. Upon her death, Tony learns her sister was having an affair with presitigous Dr. Tracer, who coincidentally attempted to revive her in vain. Tony questions Tracer and suspects he poisoned Louise so that his reputation would remain untarnished; Tracer denies this but reinforces Tony's doubts when he is unable to find the medicine he gave to Louise before death from his suitcase. At Louise's funeral, Tony greets her numerous acquaintances, including Fred, Louise's ex-boyfriend. Still in doubt over the murderer's identity, Tony requests an autopsy on Louise's corpse, revealing that she was indeed poisoned. This allows him to land Dr. Tracer in jail for the time being.

After some time, a new crime happens; a transvestite is killed and his body is found in a quarry. The seemingly unconnected case attracts Tony's attention when a picture of Louise wearing a precious black bead necklace is found within the victim's belongings. Tony attempts to find a link between the two cases, eventually locating the necklance and finding out it belonged to Ms. Wilkinson, a wealthy Toronto woman who was brutally murdered some months prior, a case that also remained open.

Tony visits the Toronto Police headquarters requesting a briefing of Ms. Wilkinson's case, but is disappointed to realize Louise perfectly matches an eyewitness' description of a woman seen fleeing from the scene.

Back in Montreal, a mysterious figure storms Louise's old college dorm, killing Margie, an acquaintance of Louise, but Julie, Louise's blind old roommate, manages to escape just in time for Tony and his partner Sgt. Ned Matthews to arrive at the scene and take her to the hospital. At the dorms, Tony discovers Margie's corpse, as well as Terence's (another student) hanging dead body, presuming him as the murderer and hypothesizing he must've preferred death over getting caught.

The events at the dorm persuade Tony of Dr. Tracer's innocence, who is then released. At the hospital, Tracer cares for Julie just as Fred arrives under the pretext of bringing her flowers, while in reality, he intends to kill her. Before Fred could stab Julie, Tony enters the room and holds him off at gunpoint, revealing that he believed Terence had been framed and that he expected the real killer to eventually come to finish the job. In the standoff, Fred confirms Tony that Louise was not only involved in Ms. Wilkinson's murder, but that she was also the mastermind behind it as well as the direct perpetrator. Fred tells Tony that Louise had convinced him to aid her in killing Ms. Wilkinson, and that Louise intended to sell the necklace in order to escape with Fred and share the wealth. A persecution ensues, culminating in Fred stealing the hospital's emergency helicopter in an attempt to flee. Tony reaches the rooftop just as Fred had begun takeoff, allowing him to land a few shots on the helicopter's fuselage, which catches fire and crashes down into the ground with an explosion.

== Cast ==
- Stuart Whitman as Captain Tony Saitta
- John Saxon as Sergeant Ned Matthews
- Martin Landau as Dr. George Tracer
- Tisa Farrow as Julie Foster
- Gayle Hunnicutt as Margie Cohn
- Carole Laure as Louise Saitta
- Jean LeClerc as Fred
- Anthony Forrest as Robert Tracer
- Jean Marchand as Terence
- Andrée St-Laurent as Elizabeth Tracer
- Peter MacNeill as Alexander
- Jerome Tiberghien as Ted Sullivan

== Production ==
Strange Shadows in an Empty Room was shot in Ottawa, Ontario and Montreal, Quebec in Canada. Director Alberto de Martino stated that Stuart Whitman agreed to do the film to have work outside of Hollywood. For the car chase in the film, de Martino did not use storyboards, stating he can't draw and was more influenced by his love of jazz music, starting in the background and improvising as he went along.

== Style ==
Roberto Curti describes the film as "essentially a whodunnit of sorts, with the inclusion of the odd [Dario] Argento-like detail". He also notes that film has "very little to do with Italian poliziotteschi of the period".

== Release ==
Strange Shadows in an Empty Room was released in Italy on March 9, 1976, where it was distributed by Fida. The film has been released with different titles in other English-speaking countries such as Blazing Magnum in the United Kingdom. Director De Martino stated that the film was based on an old story he had titled D come Delitto (M for Murder), which he re-arranged slightly. After finishing it, a producer for the film sent a telegram to De Martino, which he claims it stated that "It's got nothing to envy in any American film."

== Reception ==
In a retrospective review, AllMovie stated that the film has "plenty of slick visuals and action but makes little sense: The script is a chaotic jumble of half-baked mystery" and that it is "never convincing or believable for a second and is further hurt by a lack of sympathetic characters". The review concluded that Strange Shadows in an Empty Room can only be recommended to hardcore Eurotrash buffs."
