= Midnight Runner =

2002 novel by Jack Higgins

- First edition
- Author: Jack Higgins
- Language: English
- Genre: Thriller novel
- Publisher: HarperCollins
- Publication date: February 2002
- Publication place: United Kingdom
- Media type: Print (Hardback & Paperback)
- ISBN: 0-00-712727-8
- OCLC: 48237040
- Dewey Decimal: 823/.914 22
- LC Class: PR6058.I343 M53 2002b
- Preceded by: Edge of Danger

Midnight Runner is a novel by Jack Higgins published in 2002. It is his tenth Sean Dillon novel.

== Reviews ==
- "MIDNIGHT RUNNER (Book)." Kirkus Reviews 70.2 (15 Jan. 2002): 65. Abstract: Reviews the book 'Midnight Runner,' by Jack Higgins.
- Gannon, Sean. "Midnight Runner (Book)." People 57.16 (29 Apr. 2002): 47. Abstract: Reviews the book 'Midnight Runner,' by Jack Higgins.
- Zaleski, Jeff. "MIDNIGHT RUNNER (Book)." Publishers Weekly 249.6 (11 Feb. 2002): 162. Abstract: Reviews the book 'Midnight Runner,' by Jack Higgins.
- Harris, Karen. "Midnight Runner (Book)." Booklist 99.5 (Nov. 2002): 515. Abstract: Reviews the audiobook 'Midnight Runner,' by Jack Higgins and read by Patrick MacNee.
