= Kyle MacLachlan =

American actor (born 1959)

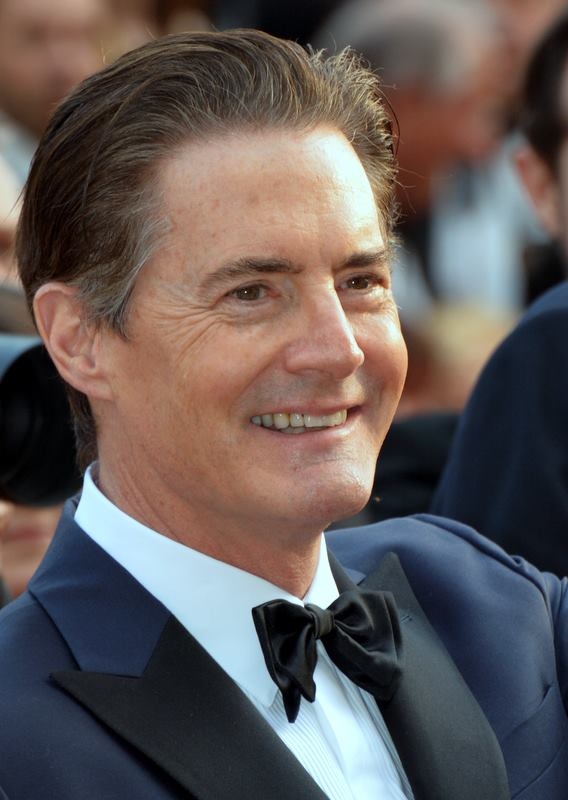
- MacLachlan in 2017
- Born: Kyle McLachlan; February 22, 1959 (age 67); Yakima, Washington, U.S.
- Education: University of Washington (BFA)
- Occupation: Actor
- Years active: 1979–present
- Spouse: Desiree Gruber (m. 2002)
- Children: 1

Kyle MacLachlan (Note: MacLachlan changed his surname to its original Scottish spelling as an adult.) (/məkˈlɒklən/; mək-LOK-lən; Scottish Gaelic: /məkˈlɒxlən/; né McLachlan; born February 22, 1959) is an American actor. He is best known for his collaborations with David Lynch, having portrayed the role of Dale Cooper thrice in Twin Peaks (1990–1991, and the 2017 revival), which won him a Golden Globe and nominations for two Primetime Emmy Awards, and its film prequel Twin Peaks: Fire Walk with Me (1992), as well as playing Paul Atreides in Dune (1984) and Jeffrey Beaumont in Blue Velvet (1986). MacLachlan's other film roles include Lloyd Gallagher in The Hidden (1987), Ray Manzarek in The Doors (1991), Cliff Vandercave in The Flintstones (1994), Zack Carey in Showgirls (1995), and Riley's father in the two films of the Inside Out film series (2015, 2024).

In addition to Twin Peaks, MacLachlan has had prominent roles on television such as Trey MacDougal on Sex and the City (2000–2002), Orson Hodge on Desperate Housewives (2006–2012), The Captain on How I Met Your Mother (2010–2014) and How I Met Your Father (2022), the Mayor of Portland on Portlandia (2011–2018), Calvin Johnson on Agents of S.H.I.E.L.D. (2014–2015), and Hank MacLean on Fallout (2024–present).

== Early life and education ==
MacLachlan was born Kyle McLachlan at Yakima Valley Memorial Hospital in Yakima, Washington. His mother, Catherine (née Stone; 1934–1986), was a public relations director for a school district and a homemaker who was active in community arts programs. His father, Kent Alan McLachlan (1933–2011), was a stockbroker and lawyer. Kyle has Scottish, German and Cornish ancestry. He grew up in Yakima as the eldest of three boys, alongside his younger brothers, Craig and Kent Jr. MacLachlan graduated from Eisenhower High School in Yakima. His mother left his father when he was 17, and his parents divorced in his senior year of high school.

MacLachlan was introduced to stage acting by his mother when she became director of a youth theater program for teenagers that she helped set up in Yakima. She also sent him to piano lessons from the age of 9 to 14, when he also began to study classical singing. While in high school, he performed in plays and in class musicals, acting in his first play at age 15. In his senior year, he had the lead role of Brindsley Miller in a production of Peter Shaffer's one-act play Black Comedy, and performed as Henry Higgins in My Fair Lady. In 1982, he graduated cum laude with a BFA in drama from the University of Washington (UW) as a student of the Professional Actor Training Program. He initially planned to major in business and also studied classical voice at UW, but changed his focus to acting.

== Career ==
=== 1980s ===
The first film MacLachlan worked on was The Changeling (1980), part of which was shot on the University of Washington campus. He was paid $10 as an extra.

In the summer of 1981, after his sophomore year at college, he played the lead in three roles at the Old Lyric Repertory Theatre in Logan, Utah, and the following summer with the Oregon Shakespeare Festival in Ashland, Oregon.

MacLachlan made his film debut in Dune (1984) in the starring role of Paul Atreides. MacLachlan was performing in Molière's Tartuffe at a Seattle-area theater when a casting agent for Dune producer Dino De Laurentiis began searching for a young lead and received multiple recommendations for him. After several screen tests, he hit it off with director David Lynch, aided by their common Pacific Northwest backgrounds, and succeeded in winning the part. This marked the beginning of a creative partnership between MacLachlan and Lynch, who would go on to collaborate on four more projects before Lynch's death in 2025.

After Dune flopped and met with poor reviews from critics, MacLachlan found it difficult to find work. He moved to Los Angeles in 1985, and auditioned for several films, including Top Gun, but failed to win any roles, eventually dropping his agent.

Lynch cast MacLachlan in the starring role of Jeffrey Beaumont in Blue Velvet (1986), which was received more positively. Reflecting on his enduring relationship with Lynch in a 2012 interview, MacLachlan remarked: "David Lynch plucked me from obscurity. He cast me as the lead in Dune and Blue Velvet, and people have seen me as this boy-next-door-cooking-up-something-weird-in-the-basement ever since." Lynch biographer Chris Rodley described MacLachlan as an on-screen incarnation of Lynch's own persona.

He starred in the 1987 science fiction action film The Hidden as FBI agent Lloyd Gallagher. He also had a small role in the romantic comedy Don't Tell Her It's Me.

=== 1990s ===
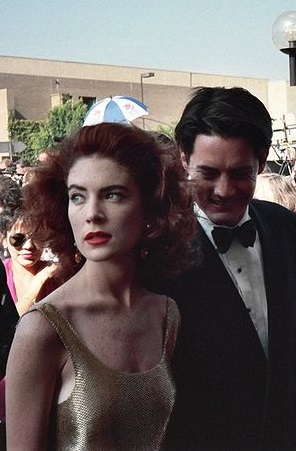
MacLachlan and Lara Flynn Boyle arriving at the 43rd Primetime Emmy Awards in August 1991

MacLachlan further collaborated with Lynch in the ABC television series Twin Peaks (1990–91), playing Special Agent Dale Cooper, reprising that role for Lynch's 1992 prequel film Twin Peaks: Fire Walk with Me. Lynch commented on those roles in a GQ story about MacLachlan: "Kyle plays innocents who are interested in the mysteries of life. He's the person you trust enough to go into a strange world with." MacLachlan also said he considered Lynch one of his mentors who had a "monumental impact" on him. Lynch, who was known to allow his collaborative partners a large degree of control over their roles when working with him, rewrote scenes in Blue Velvet and Twin Peaks at the request of MacLachlan, who felt they were not right for his characters.

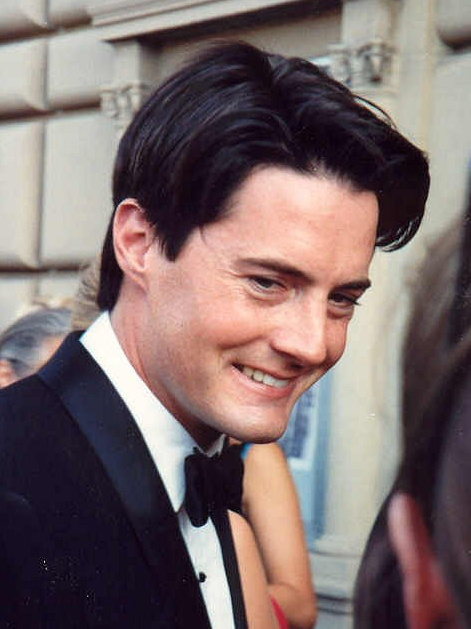
MacLachlan at the 1991 Emmy Awards

MacLachlan appeared as musician Ray Manzarek in Oliver Stone's 1991 film The Doors, about the band of the same name. He had previously turned down Stone's offer to play Chris in the 1986 movie Platoon, which ultimately went to Charlie Sheen. Also, in 1991, he played the role of a killer in Tales from the Crypt. In the 1993 film version of Franz Kafka's The Trial, with a screenplay by Harold Pinter, MacLachlan played the lead role of the persecuted Josef K.

MacLachlan co-starred with Samuel L. Jackson as a rookie prison guard in John Frankenheimer's 1994 Emmy-winning HBO film Against the Wall about the Attica prison riots. In 1994, he was also featured in The Flintstones, a live-action movie adaptation of the animated sitcom of the same name, portraying Cliff Vandercave, the movie's main antagonist, opposite John Goodman as Fred Flintstone and Rick Moranis as Barney Rubble.

In 1995, MacLachlan starred in Paul Verhoeven's Showgirls. The movie was heavily panned by critics, and it collected a record seven Golden Raspberry Awards. MacLachlan recalls that when he watched Showgirls for the first time before the premiere, he thought it was "horrible". But he later realised that the movie was "inadvertently funny" and embraced for its campiness. According to MacLachlan, although he skipped the movie's press tour, he had sat through the whole screening, contrary to reports that he walked out.

=== 2000s ===
From 2000 to 2002, MacLachlan had a recurring role in the American television series Sex and the City, portraying Dr. Trey MacDougal, the one-time husband of Charlotte York (Kristin Davis). MacLachlan played King Claudius in the 2000 film Hamlet based on William Shakespeare's play. In the video game Grand Theft Auto III released in 2001, he voiced the character of the sociopathic real-estate developer Donald Love. In 2002, he made his West End debut in John Kolvenbach's On an Average Day with Woody Harrelson.

In 2003, MacLachlan made his Broadway debut as Aston in Harold Pinter's The Caretaker with Patrick Stewart. He portrayed the spirit of Cary Grant in the 2004 film Touch of Pink. His resemblance to Grant had been previously noted in an episode of Twin Peaks. That same year he also had a guest role in Law & Order: Special Victims Unit, in which he played a psychiatrist who shot and killed a sociopathic child who had murdered his son. He was a guest star in the show again in 2011, as a politician whose son is involved in a rape accusation.

In 2006, after starring in the short-lived In Justice, MacLachlan appeared in Desperate Housewives as the mysterious dentist Orson Hodge. He first appeared during the show's second season, and became a full-time cast member at the start of season three. In 2007, MacLachlan was one of the presenters at the London leg of Live Earth benefit concerts. He appeared in the 2008 film The Sisterhood of the Traveling Pants 2. In the American English version of the cult 2006 Norwegian animated film Free Jimmy released in 2008, he voiced the character of "Marius", a militant animal rights activist.

=== 2010s ===
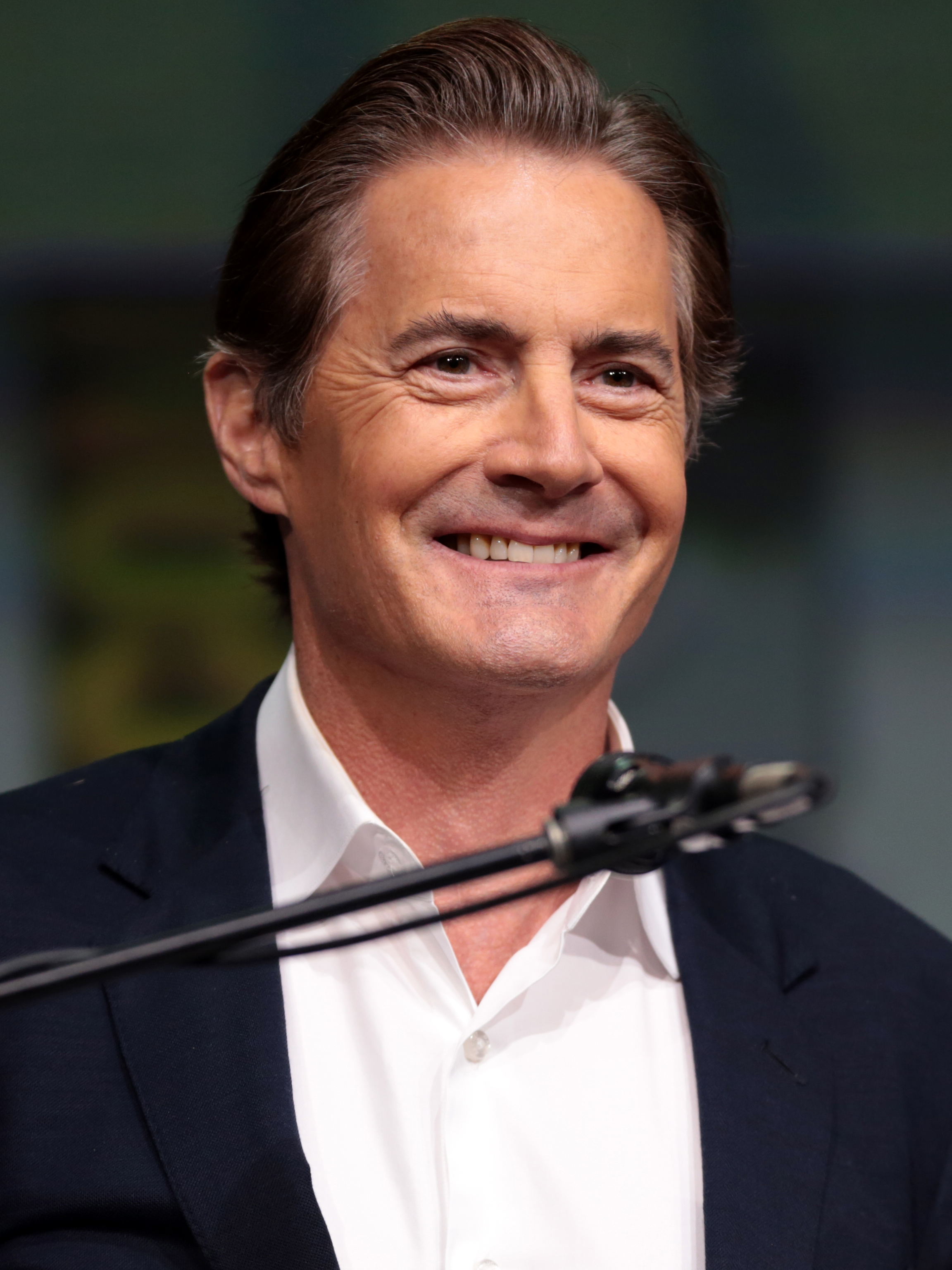
MacLachlan at the 2017 San Diego Comic-Con

In 2010, after four years of playing Orson Hodge, MacLachlan decided to leave Desperate Housewives as he found the commute from his home in New York City to the set in Los Angeles increasingly difficult since becoming a father in 2008. However, he returned as a guest star in 2012 for season eight, the final season of Desperate Housewives. He also guest starred as George "The Captain" Van Smoot in seasons six, eight and nine of How I Met Your Mother, from 2010 until 2014. He would reprise the role in the first season of the spinoff How I Met Your Father in 2022.

From 2011 to 2018, he played the role of Mayor of Portland, Oregon, in the IFC comedy Portlandia. In 2013 and 2014 he appeared as prosecutor Josh Perotti in four episodes of The Good Wife. In 2014 and 2015 he appeared in the Marvel Cinematic Universe television series Agents of S.H.I.E.L.D. as villain Calvin Johnson / The Doctor. In 2015, he voiced Riley Anderson's father in the Pixar animated feature Inside Out. In January 2015, it was announced that MacLachlan would return as Special Agent Dale Cooper for the new limited television series Twin Peaks: The Return, which debuted on May 21, 2017. He received a Saturn Award for his performance. In an interview, MacLachlan said he doesn't understand all of Twin Peaks, and that fans understand it much more than him.

In 2018, MacLachlan starred as Isaac Izard, the main antagonist in the fantasy-horror family film The House with a Clock in its Walls. In 2019, he appeared as a team owner in Steven Soderbergh's High Flying Bird which was shot entirely on the iPhone 8. Later that year, he co-starred in Carol's Second Act, from the writers of Booksmart. The series was canceled in 2020.

At the 11th Annual Governors Awards, held on October 27, 2019, MacLachlan and his Blue Velvet co-star Laura Dern paid tribute to their friend and collaborator David Lynch, who received an Academy Honorary Award for his work.

=== 2020s ===
In 2020, he reunited with his Hamlet co-star Ethan Hawke, portraying Thomas Edison opposite Hawke's Tesla. Later that year, he made an uncredited cameo appearance in HBO's How To with John Wilson, which Vulture described as "a glorious 14 seconds". He then portrayed Franklin D. Roosevelt in Atlantic Crossing, which aired on Masterpiece in 2021.

In 2022, MacLachlan co-starred with Jon Hamm in Confess, Fletch and was also cast as Chief Justice Earl Warren in Miranda's Victim. From 2023 to 2024, he returned to voiceover work with a guest-starring role on Hulu's Futurama and reprised his role as Riley's dad in Pixar's Inside Out 2 and Disney+'s Dream Productions.

MacLachlan also co-hosted and co-created PodcastOne's Varnamtown podcast with Epic Magazine co-founder Joshua Davis. The true crime series explores Varnamtown, North Carolina's ties to Pablo Escobar.

In 2024, he was honored with the Canal+ Icon Award at Canneseries ahead of his role in Amazon's Fallout, the adaptation of the popular video game series. It was quickly renewed for a second season in April 2024 followed by an early renewal for a third season in May 2025. In a review of the second season, The Seattle Times wrote that his increased screen time "gives the great actor room to be both goofy and menacing in equal measure, even when he’s not saying a word."

In September 2024, he was cast alongside Connie Britton in Overcompensating, a college-set comedy series created by and starring Benito Skinner. The series premiered in May 2025 to positive reviews and was renewed for a second season in September 2025.

In January 2025, the WGAW announced that MacLachlan would posthumously present the Laurel Award for Screenwriting Achievement to David Lynch, who had died earlier that month. MacLachlan had previously honored his longtime friend and collaborator with tributes in The New York Times, GQ and on his personal Instagram account, where he wrote, "I was willing to follow him anywhere because joining him on the journey of discovery, searching and finding together, was the whole point. I stepped out into the unknown because I knew David was floating out there with me. It's like Agent Cooper says to Sheriff Truman in Twin Peaks: 'I have no idea where this will lead us, but I have a definite feeling it will be a place both wonderful and strange.' I will miss my dear friend. He has made my world—all of our worlds—both wonderful and strange".

In September 2025, MacLachlan appeared once again alongside his Hamlet and Tesla co-star Ethan Hawke in FX’s The Lowdown, a new series from Reservation Dogs creator Sterlin Harjo. That same month, MacLachlan launched his second podcast, What Are We Even Doing?, a weekly series in which he interviews younger actors and artists about their creative processes. Distributed by iHeartRadio’s Elvis Duran Podcast Network, the podcast has featured guests such as Kaia Gerber, Dylan O’Brien, Benito Skinner, and Caleb Hearon.

MacLachlan released his memoir, Fictional Selves: A Memoir in September 2026 through Crown Publishing. It debuted at number five on The New York Times Best Seller list, receiving generally positive reviews. USA Today called the book "quirky and wonderfully self-effacing," while The New York Times saw it as "intelligent, wry, [and] inquisitive." GQ compared the work to MacLachlan himself "...earnest, full of unexpected depth and self-doubt, and often quite funny," and Library Journal praised his approach of writing a memoir with "a distinctive personality" that prevents it from "becoming a conventional story of Hollywood highs and lows."

== Personal life ==
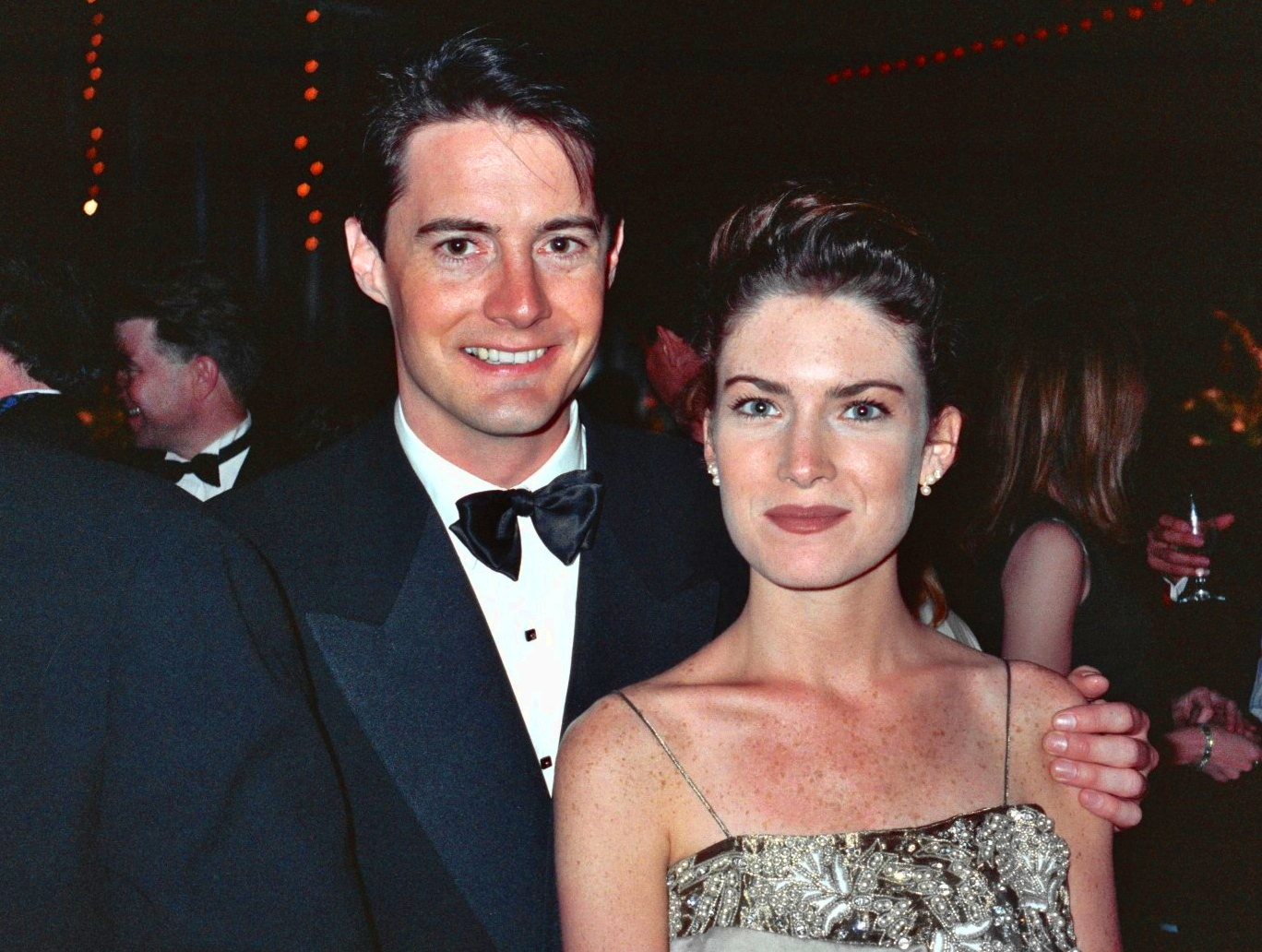
MacLachlan with actress Lara Flynn Boyle, at the 1990 Emmy Awards

=== Family ===
MacLachlan's mother died of ovarian cancer in 1986, aged 52, shortly before Blue Velvet was released. She had been diagnosed while he was filming Dune in 1983, and delayed informing him of the diagnosis. His father died of post-surgery complications in 2011.

=== Relationships ===
MacLachlan dated his Blue Velvet co-star Laura Dern from 1985 to 1989. Subsequently, he was in a relationship with Twin Peaks co-star Lara Flynn Boyle from 1990 to 1992. In 1992, after his relationship with Boyle ended, he began a relationship with supermodel Linda Evangelista after they met at a photo shoot they did together for Barneys New York. According to MacLachlan, they had been engaged for a few years when their six-year relationship ended in 1998.

=== Marriage ===
In 1999, he met and began a relationship with publicist Desiree Gruber. Gruber runs her own public relations agency; she became an executive producer of Project Runway in 2004. MacLachlan moved to New York City because he was filming Sex and the City and Gruber was based there. They were married on April 20, 2002. Their son was born on July 25, 2008. The family has residences in Los Angeles and New York.

=== Winemaking ===
MacLachlan, a wine lover, co-founded Pursued by Bear with vintner Eric Dunham in 2005 under Dunham Cellars in Walla Walla, Washington. The name, inspired by Shakespeare's The Winter's Tale, comes from the stage direction "Exit, pursued by a bear". Recognized as one of Washington's top-rated labels, Pursued by Bear produces five wines: Twin Bear, Pursued by Bear, Baby Bear, Blushing Bear, and Bear Cub.

=== Social media ===
In 2024, MacLachlan’s Instagram and TikTok accounts gained attention for his engagement with viral trends and popular culture. His posts, which featured music and inspiration from artists like Lorde, Chappell Roan, and Charli XCX's Brat, received positive reactions from the artists themselves. Multiple publications praised his ability to connect with a Gen-Z audience and affectionately elevated him to "babygirl" status.

== Filmography ==
=== Film ===
Year	Title	Role	Notes
1980	The Changeling	Student	Uncredited extra
1984	Dune	Paul Atreides	
1986	Blue Velvet	Jeffrey Beaumont	
1987	The Hidden	Lloyd Gallagher	
1990	Don't Tell Her It's Me	Trout	
1991	The Doors	Ray Manzarek	
1992	Where the Day Takes You	Ted	
1992	Twin Peaks: Fire Walk with Me	FBI Special Agent Dale Cooper	
1992	Rich in Love	Billy McQueen	
1993	The Trial	Josef K.	
1994	The Flintstones	Clifford "Cliff" Vandercave	
1995	Showgirls	Zack Carey	
1996	The Trigger Effect	Matthew Kay	
1996	Mad Dog Time	Jake Parker	
1997	One Night Stand	Vernon Rivers	
2000	XChange	James Fisk / Stuart Toffler 2	
2000	Hamlet	Claudius	
2000	Timecode	Bunny Drysdale	
2001	Me Without You	Daniel	
2001	Perfume	Business Manager	
2002	Miranda	Nailor	
2003	Northfork	Mr. Hope	
2004	Touch of Pink	Spirit of Cary Grant	
2008	Free Jimmy	Marius	English dub
2008	Justice League: The New Frontier	Superman	Voice, direct-to-video
2008	The Sisterhood of the Traveling Pants 2	Bill Kerr	Uncredited
2009	Mao's Last Dancer	Charles C. Foster	
2009	The Smell of Success	Jimmy St. James	
2011	Peace, Love & Misunderstanding	Mark	
2013	Breathe In	Peter Sebeck	
2015	Inside Out	Bill Andersen	Voice
2015	Riley's First Date?	Bill Andersen	Voice, short film
2018	Giant Little Ones	Ray Winter	
2018	The House with a Clock in Its Walls	Isaac Izard	
2019	High Flying Bird	David Seton	
2019	The Staggering Girl	Matteo / Bruno / Angelo	Short film
2020	Tesla	Thomas Edison	
2020	Capone	Dr. Karlock	
2022	Confess, Fletch	Horan	
2023	Miranda's Victim	Chief Justice Earl Warren	
2024	Inside Out 2	Bill Andersen	Voice
2024	Blink Twice	Rich	
2025	Echo Valley	Richard Garrett	
TBA	You Deserve Each Other		Post-production
TBA	Altar		Post-production

=== Television ===
Year	Title	Role	Notes
1989	Dream Breakers	Bobby O'Connor	Television film
1990–1991	Twin Peaks	FBI Special Agent Dale Cooper	30 episodes
1990	Saturday Night Live	Himself (host)	Episode: "Kyle MacLachlan/Sinéad O'Connor"
1990	The American Experience	Narrator	Episode: "Insanity on Trial"
1991	Tales from the Crypt	Earl Raymond Digs	Episode: "Carrion Death"
1994	Against the Wall	Michael Smith	Television film
1994	Roswell	Jesse A. Marcel	Television film
1995	The Conversation	Harry Caul	Pilot
1996	Moonshine Highway	Jed Muldoon	Television film
1997	Windsor Protocol	Sean Dillon	Television film
1998	Thunder Point	Sean Dillon	Television film
1998	Route 9	Booth Parker	Television film
1998	The Invisible Man	Jack Griffin	Pilot
2000	The Spring	Dennis Conway	Television film
2000–2002	Sex and the City	Trey MacDougal	23 episodes
2002	Jo	Role unknown	Pilot
2004	Law & Order: Special Victims Unit	Dr. Brett Morton	Episode: "Conscience"
2004	The Librarian: Quest for the Spear	Edward Wilde	Television film
2005	Mysterious Island	Cyrus Smith	Television film
2006	In Justice	David Swain	13 episodes
2006–2012	Desperate Housewives	Orson Hodge	85 episodes
2010–2014	How I Met Your Mother	George Van Smoot / The Captain	7 episodes
2011	The Doctor	Jason	Pilot
2011	Law & Order: Special Victims Unit	Andrew Raines	Episode: "Blood Brothers"
2011–2018	Portlandia	Mayor of Portland	24 episodes
2012	Made in Jersey	Donovan Stark	8 episodes
2013–2014	The Good Wife	Josh Perotti	4 episodes
2014	Believe	Roman Skouras	12 episodes
2014–2015	Agents of S.H.I.E.L.D.	Calvin Johnson / The Doctor	13 episodes
2016	Gravity Falls	Bus Driver	Voice, episode: "Weirdmageddon 3: Take Back The Falls"
2017	Twin Peaks: The Return	FBI Special Agent Dale Cooper / Mr. C / Dougie Jones	18 episodes
2018, 2026	American Dad!	Del	Voice, 2 episodes
2019–2020	Carol's Second Act	Dr. Frost	18 episodes
2020	How to With John Wilson	Himself	Episode: "How to Make Small Talk"; uncredited
2020	Atlantic Crossing	Franklin D. Roosevelt	8 episodes
2022	Joe vs. Carole	Howard Baskin	8 episodes
2022	How I Met Your Father	George Van Smoot / The Captain	2 episodes
2023	Lucky Hank	Dickie Pope	2 episodes
2023–2025	Star Wars: Young Jedi Adventures	Draiven Bosh	Voice, 4 episodes
2023–2024	Futurama	Dung Beetle Majordomo, Himself	Voices, 2 episodes
2024–present	Fallout	Hank MacLean	16 episodes
2024	Dream Productions	Bill Andersen	Voice, 2 episodes
2025	Primos	Bill	Voice, episode: "Summer of Sueños"
2025	Overcompensating	John	2 episodes
2025–2026	The Lowdown	Donald Washberg	9 episodes

=== Video games ===
Year	Title	Role	Notes
1992	Dune	Paul Atreides	Likeness, credited with "Special Thanks"
2001	Grand Theft Auto III	Donald Love	Voice

=== Theatre ===
Year	Title	Role	Notes
1983	Tartuffe	Damis	Empty Space Theatre
1988	The Palace of Amateurs	Terrence Beebe	Minetta Lane Theatre
2002	On An Average Day	Jack	Harold Pinter Theatre
2003–2004	The Caretaker	Aston	American Airlines Theatre

== Awards and nominations ==
Year	Association	Category	Nominated work	Result	Ref.
1990	Primetime Emmy Awards	Outstanding Lead Actor in a Drama Series	Twin Peaks	Nominated	
1991	Primetime Emmy Awards	Outstanding Lead Actor in a Drama Series	Twin Peaks	Nominated	
1991	Golden Globe Awards	Best Actor – Television Series Drama	Twin Peaks	Won	
1991	Viewers for Quality Television	Best Actor in a Quality Drama Series	Twin Peaks	Nominated	
1991	Grammy Awards	Best Audio Book, Narration & Storytelling Recording	"Diane..." - The Twin Peaks Tapes of Agent Cooper	Nominated	
1996	Golden Raspberry Awards	Worst Actor	Showgirls	Nominated	
2005	Genie Awards	Best Supporting Actor	Touch of Pink	Nominated	
2005	Saturn Awards	Best Supporting Actor on Television	The Librarian: Quest for the Spear	Nominated	
2007	Actor Awards	Outstanding Performance by an Ensemble in a Comedy Series	Desperate Housewives	Nominated	
2008	Actor Awards	Outstanding Performance by an Ensemble in a Comedy Series	Desperate Housewives	Nominated	
2009	Actor Awards	Outstanding Performance by an Ensemble in a Comedy Series	Desperate Housewives	Nominated	
2018	Golden Globe Awards	Best Actor – Miniseries or Television Film	Twin Peaks	Nominated	
2018	Dorian Awards	TV Performance of the Year - Actor	Twin Peaks	Won	
2018	Empire Awards	Best Actor in a TV series	Twin Peaks	Nominated	
2018	Saturn Awards	Best Actor on Television	Twin Peaks	Won	
2024	Astra TV Awards	Best Guest Actor in a Drama Series	Fallout	Won	
2025	Saturn Awards	Best Guest Starring Role on Television	Fallout	Nominated	

== See also ==
- List of celebrities who own wineries and vineyards
- List of Golden Globe winners
