= Pachamama (film) =

- Film poster
- Directed by: Juan Antin
- Written by: Christophe Poujol; Juan Antin
- Produced by: Didier Brunner
- Starring: Adam Moussamih; Charli Birdgenaw; Vlasta Vrana
- Music by: Pierre Hamon
- Production company: Folivari
- Distributed by: Netflix
- Release dates: October 20, 2018 (Animation Is Film Festival); December 12, 2018
- Running time: 72 minutes
- Countries: France; Luxembourg; Canada
- Languages: English; French Luxembourgish

Pachamama is a 2018 French-Luxembourgian-Canadian animation film directed by Juan Antin and written by Antin and Christophe Poujol.

== Plot ==
Tepulpai, a young 10-year-old boy, is rejected approval to becoming a "Great One", although he dreams of becoming a Shaman. The village is soon visited by an Incan tax collector, who takes away the village's most precious treasure, the Huaca, and most of their crops, leaving the villagers with nothing to eat. Walumama, an elderly woman, faints at the absence of the statue, while Tepulpai is very angry and says they must get the Huaca back. When he is asked to leave, he is determined to find the Huaca and starts on his journey.

As Tepulpai crosses the rope bridge on his way to Cusco, he finds Naira, who wishes to join him and retrieve the Huaca. Tepulpai is unhappy with Naira and immediately refuses, but Naira crosses the rope bridge herself, and Tepulpai reluctantly agrees that she can travel with him. The two eventually find the city of Cusco, and Naira tells Tepulpai he should start thinking twice before making decisions. As they argue, they find the chasqui of the Inca, who appears very ill and tired. Before he dies, he tells the children about a floating house on the waters holding beings from a different world, describing them as "monsters" with metal skins that spit fire, and they must send his message. Tepulpai takes the chasqui's pututu and head to Cusco.

The two follow two men to the Great Inca. Naira agrees to tell about the message, but only if the Huaca is returned. The Great Inca, however, does not believe the story, thinking it was a lie from the Great Observer. Enraged, Tepulpai declares that the Great Inca be "thrown out of his stupid tray", but soon after, the "gods" arrive and attack, knocking the Great Inca to the ground. The "gods" are revealed to be conquistadors, and the children barely escape with the Huaca. They manage to hide in an abandoned house, and Tepulpai fools the thieves with Kirkincho, an armadillo, while Naira runs back to the village with the Huaca. The thieves, however, find out that Tepulpai was not holding the real Huaca, and he and Kirkincho are sucked into a whirlpool.

Tepulpai finds himself in an underground system and finds the blind Great Observer and his puma, who sees for him. The Great Observer gives him food and dries him off. He tells Tepulpai there is no way out of the labyrinth and helps him realize that the Great Condor's feather he owned was taken without permission. Under a blanket, he silently apologizes to the Great Condor for taking its feather. It forgives him, and the feather blows in the wind, leading him out of the labyrinth.

The Great Condor flies past the children and gives them a ride back to the village, while Kirkincho and Naira's llama, Llamita, run back on their own. Naira soon discovers that the Great Condor was shot by one of the thieves' guns, and they receive a rough landing. Tepulpai holds the now broken Huaca, and finds the Great Condor, who is revealed to be the Shaman. The men in metal soon arrive, and attempt to steal the Huaca. The Huaca breaks, and the crops are destroyed by an explosion. Tepulpai finds that Walumama has joined the ancestors and discovers seeds hidden in the Huaca. He offers them to Pachamama, and while it rains, everyone dances to the music.

== Cast ==
- Adam Moussamih as Tepulpaï
- Charli Birdgenaw as Naïra
- Vlasta Vrana as Shaman
- Sonja Ball as Walumama/Great Inca's Wife
- Terrence Scammell as Fishermen
- Richard Dumont as Tax Collector
- Alexandre Harrouch as Great Inca/Chasqui
