= A Darker Place =

2009 novel by Jack Higgins

- First edition (UK)
- Author: Jack Higgins
- Language: English
- Genre: Thriller novel
- Published: 2009 (Penguin Group US)
- Publication place: United Kingdom
- Media type: Print (hardback & paperback)
- Pages: 352
- ISBN: 9781440629358

A Darker Place is a 2009 novel by Jack Higgins. It is the 16th book in his Sean Dillon series.

== Plot summary ==
The novel is about a famous Russian writer and ex-paratrooper named Alexander Kurbsky, who is fed up with the Putin government and decides he wants to "disappear" into the West. He is under no illusions, however, about how the news will be greeted at home. Having seen too many of his countrymen die mysteriously at the hands of the thuggish Russian security services, he makes elaborate plans for his escape and concealment with Charles Ferguson, Sean Dillon, and the rest of the group known informally as the Prime Minister's private army. However, Kurbsky is still working for the Russians and intends to infiltrate the highest levels of Western intelligence.
