= Natural Enemy =

1996 Canadian-American direct-to-video film

- DVD artwork
- Directed by: Douglas Jackson
- Screenplay by: Kevin Bernhardt
- Produced by: Nicolas Clermont
- Starring: Donald Sutherland; William McNamara; Lesley Ann Warren; Joe Pantoliano; Tia Carrere
- Cinematography: Rodney Gibbons
- Edited by: Yves Langlois
- Music by: Alan Reeves
- Production companies: Filmline International; Home Box Office (HBO); Phoenician Films; Screen Partners
- Distributed by: Home Box Office; C/FP Distribution
- Release date: December 18, 1996 (Sweden)
- Running time: 88 minutes
- Countries: Canada; United States
- Language: English
- Budget: CAD $6,200,000

Natural Enemy is a 1996 Canadian-American direct-to-video thriller film directed by Douglas Jackson and starring Donald Sutherland, William McNamara, Lesley Ann Warren, Joe Pantoliano, and Tia Carrere.

== Filming ==
The film was shot in Montreal, Quebec from 18 November 1995 to 15 December 1995.

== Plot ==
Ted Robards, in the past a successful stock broker, is on the verge of financial ruin. His son, Chris, has disappointed Ted a long time ago, creating only troubles for him. His wife, Sandy, is obsessed with the idea of having the second child. Ted's last hope is a promising young employee, Jeremy Harper, a stellar Harvard alumnus, who is able to sign an important deal that will save Ted and his firm from imminent bankruptcy. However, Jeremy only pretends to support the firm. His real desire is to secretly destroy Ted's business from within, while also wreaking havoc on the whole Robards family.

Trying to keep Jeremy in the firm, Ted tries to fulfill at least one of his requests—he offers Jeremy and his girlfriend to move in with him and thus solve their housing issue. Jeremy agrees, but his appearance in the house only accelerates the Robards' demise. In vain, Ted and Sandy try to understand what caused Jeremy's unexpected aggression. But flashbacks reveal Jeremy's traumatic childhood and his hidden motivation. Later, it turns out that Ted's now pregnant wife has some dark secrets that may explain Jeremy's twisted plans to destroy her family.

== Cast ==
- Donald Sutherland as Ted Robards
- William McNamara as Jeremy Harper
  - Michael Caloz as Young Jeremy Harper
- Lesley Ann Warren as Sandy Robards
- Joe Pantoliano as Stuart
- Tia Carrere as Christina
- Christian Tessier as Chris Robards
- Lenore Zann as Gina Knox
- Rosemary Dunsmore as Judy
- Vlasta Vrana as Stanley
- Claudia Besso as Claire
- Serge Houde as Sherwood
- Richard Zeman as Bob
- Terry Haig as IRS Agent
- Tedd Dillon as Father
- Misha Jackson as Baby
