= Bethune: The Making of a Hero =

- Film poster
- Directed by: Phillip Borsos
- Written by: Ted Allan (Note: Phillip Borsos and Donald Sutherland claim that Dennis Clark rewrote Allan's script.)
- Produced by: Nicolas Clermont; Pieter Kroonenburg; Jacques Dorfmann; Wang Xingang
- Starring: Donald Sutherland; Helen Mirren; Colm Feore
- Cinematography: Mike Molloy; Raoul Coutard
- Edited by: Yves Langlois; Angelo Corrao
- Music by: Alan Reeves
- Production companies: Filmline International; August First Film Studio
- Distributed by: C/FP Distribution
- Release date: 27 August 1990
- Running time: 116 minutes
- Countries: Canada; China; France
- Language: English
- Budget: $15–20 million
- Box office: $400,000<

Bethune: The Making of a Hero is a 1990 biographical period drama film directed by Phillip Borsos. The film is about the life and death of Norman Bethune, a Canadian physician who served as a combat surgeon during the Second Sino-Japanese War. The cast includes Donald Sutherland as Bethune, Helen Mirren as Frances Penny Bethune, Colm Feore as Chester Rice, and Anouk Aimée as Marie-France Coudaire.

Ted Allan, who met Bethune before his death, attempted to make a film about Bethune starting in 1942. He presented scripts to 20th Century Fox, Edward Lewis, Columbia Pictures, and Warner Bros. from the 1940s to the 1970s. John Kemeny and Denis Héroux attempted to produce the film with the aid of the Chinese government in the 1980s, but failed due to financial difficulties. Nicolas Clermont and Pieter Kroonenburg, the operators of Filmline, bought the script after Allan's daughter showed it to them. Borsos was selected to direct the film after Ted Kotcheff left over financial disputes.

The film was in production for five years and was the most expensive film in Canadian history until Shadow of the Wolf. It was an international coproduction between Canada, France, and China. The film was shot in China with the aid of the August First Film Studio in 1987, but financial problems halted production for a year, and shooting was completed by 23 December 1988. The Canadian government's support for the film waned after the Tiananmen Square massacre. The authorship of the film is in dispute; Borsos and Sutherland claim that Dennis Clark rewrote Allan's script, which was "pretentious and two-dimensional and unplayable", according to Sutherland.

The film's long production time delayed its release by two years and caused it to miss its scheduled premiere at the opening of the 1989 Montreal World Film Festival. The film was shown at the 1990 Montreal World Film Festival but failed in its theatrical release before being shown on television as a four-hour miniseries. The film's troubled production was chronicled in Bob McKeown's Strangers in a Strange Land, which was shown at the 1988 Toronto International Film Festival, one of the attempted premiere sites for Bethune: The Making of a Hero.

== Plot ==
In 1939, a funeral procession is held for Norman Bethune in China while journalist Chester Rice reads about his death in Canada. Rice recounts the research he conducted into Bethune.

Bethune comes to Hankou, China in 1938, during the Second Sino-Japanese War, to join the Eighth Route Army. The train carrying his medical supplies was bombed before his arrival. Bethune, accompanied by his translator Tung and salvaged supplies, are transported by boat and on foot to the army's headquarters in Yan'an. Bethune continues his journey to Yan'an. He sees an execution carried out by the National Revolutionary Army and praises the military activities of the People's Liberation Army in his journal.

Throughout the film, flashbacks show earlier events in Bethune's life. In 1925, Bethune buys a practice using Frances Penny Bethune's inheritance and gives free medical care to those who cannot afford it. Frances and Bethune are suffering from a troubled marriage. She announces her pregnancy to Bethune, but wants an abortion while he believes that a child would help their marriage. He refuses to perform an abortion and Frances leaves him.

Back in 1938 on his long journey to Yan'an, Missionary Janet Dowd refuses to allow Bethune to transport his supplies through her area stating that the Japanese would shut down her mission and deport her if she did. Bethune and Dowd kiss after a dinner.

In 1927, Bethune is hospitalized at the Trudeau Sanatorium after contracting tuberculosis. He wants a pneumothorax machine used on him to treat his tuberculosis, but doctors refuse to perform the operation due to the chance it would kill him. He performs the operation on himself and recovers. He writes to Frances to come back to him and they remarry. After Dr. Archibald receives a letter from Bethune about tuberculous, he trains Bethune to be a surgeon. Bethune meets Marie-France Coudaire. Bethune and Archibald argue about Norman's high causality rate for patients.

Bethune arrives in Yan'an and Mao appoints him as the medical advisor to the Eighth Route Army and head of all hospital and medical units. Bethune treats the victims of a Japanese air raid, but local residents are hesitant to donate blood. He witnesses the poor medical treatment and living conditions of the overcrowded injured, who are suffering from gangrene. Bethune dismisses the head doctor and berates the staff for their incompetence.

Early 1930s, Bethune becomes an advocate for socialized medicine during the Great Depression. Rice meets Bethune at an art exhibit and asks to interview him for the Labour Gazette. Bethune argues with Rice and criticizes communism and the medical system in the Soviet Union. Bethune returns from a tour of the Soviet Union and praises its medical system.

Bethune sees newsreels of the Spanish Civil War and conducts speaking tours condemning fascism and the Canadian government's inaction. At one of these events, he comes out in support of communism and the crowd sings The Internationale. He goes to Spain to aid the Republicans, with Rice acting as his medical assistant. Rice, now a political commissar, reports Bethune to the Republican leadership after seeing his disrespectful attitude towards women and his drinking habits. Bethune is dismissed from the country. Frances divorces Bethune in order to marry Alan Coleman.

In the Chinese battlefield, Bethune organizes a medical training facility near the frontline, but it is destroyed by the Japanese. Bethune cuts his finger while operating on a soldier and contracts sepsis. Dowd begins smuggling in supplies and the Japanese destroy her mission. Bethune dies and is eulogized by Mao.

== Cast ==
- Donald Sutherland as Norman Bethune
- Helen Mirren as Frances Penny Bethune
- Colm Feore as Chester Rice (Note: Rice was based on Ted Allan)
- Ronald Pickup as Alan Coleman
- Geoffrey Chater as Edward Archibald
- Anouk Aimée as Marie-France Coudaire
- Yvan Ponton as Charles Coudaire
- Helen Shaver as Janet Dowd
- James Pax as Mr. Tung
- Guo Da as Dr. Chian
- Liu Li-Nian as Dr. Fong
- Zhang Ke-Yaw as Mao Zedong
- Tan Zong-Yao as Nie Rongzhen
- Li Hai-Lang as Shiao
- Xing Ji-zhou as Cook Wu
- Iñaki Aierra as Antonio Salvador
- Danute Kristo as Ingrid Halstrom

== Production ==
=== Preproduction ===
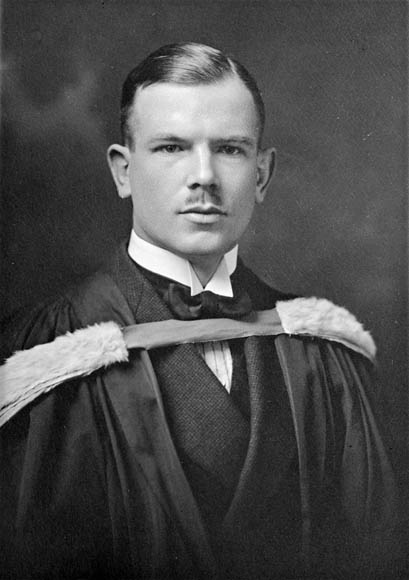
Norman Bethune was a Canadian surgeon who died in China in 1939

Ted Allan, a correspondent for the Communist Party of Canada's newspaper, met Norman Bethune in Spain at age 18 and started writing about him in 1940. The two last met in 1937, and Bethune died from blood poisoning in China in 1939. In 1942, Allan sold his 185-page script based on the life of Bethune to 20th Century Fox for around US$25,000 (equivalent to $492,617 in 2025), but the film was not produced.

The Red Scare prevented further development of the film and Allan left the United States for Toronto in 1950. Allan and Sydney Gordon wrote The Scalpel, the Sword: The Story of Doctor Norman Bethune in 1952, which sold 1.5 million copies. Situ Huimin, head of the China Film Bureau, asked Allan to write a script for a Bethune film in 1957. Allan and Gordon went to China in 1958, but Allan believed that he could not write the film as wanted by the Chinese. Gordon stayed in China, but did not write a script. The two did not cooperate again and Gordon refused to help in film deals until his death in 1985.

From the 1940s to 1970s the title of the script changed between Bethune, Lifetide, The Long March, and Making of a Hero. Columbia Pictures and Warner Bros. considered producing the script. Allan wrote a script for Edward Lewis in 1969, and presented four versions of the script to Columbia between 1975 and 1978, after the success of Lies My Father Told Me, but none were produced. Lewis also commissioned a script from Gordon and Otto Preminger, who Gordon sold his half of the rights of The Scalpel, the Sword to, wanted to produce it despite it not being written. Allan refused to sell his rights stating that "I didn't want Preminger to direct it". Allan bought his script back from 20th Century Fox after being commissioned by Lewis. CAN$10,000 (equivalent to $52,797 in 2025) was invested by the Canadian Film Development Corporation into Allan's first-draft script in 1976. John Kemeny secured additional investment from Columbia. Allan, Norman Jewison, Kemeny, and Michael Spencer travelled to China, with CFDC funding. Between 1975 and 1978, Allan rewrote the script four times for each new head of Columbia.

Warner Bros. stated that they would only finance the film if a major star was cast as Bethune. Robert Redford, Jack Nicholson, Paul Newman, Dustin Hoffman, and Warren Beatty were listed as possible options. Redford was interested, but requested a rewrite of the script which Kemeny and Kotcheff could not finance. Jewison proposed making a television series, but all of the networks declined.

In June 1980, Kemeny and Denis Héroux announced a plan to create Bethune-The Long March on a budget of $25 million. Kotcheff was attached to direct the film. Kemeny and Kotcheff tried to negotiate a deal with the China Film Corporation and August First Film Studio. Filming was meant to start in February 1981, but financial troubles resulted in the rights reverting to Allan. Kemeny left the project in 1984.

Nicolas Clermont and Pieter Kroonenburg became involved in 1985, after being shown the script by Allan's daughter Julie, who worked for their company Filmline. Kroonenburg was first made aware of the project by Gilles Carle in 1984. Filmline purchased the script for $5,000. Julie also negotiated with the Chinese government and the film was given support from August First Film Studio while the Chinese received the distribution rights for China and eastern Europe. Clermont stated that "What it cost Bertolucci and Spielberg $5 million to $6 million to shoot in China cost us nothing". French producer Jacques Dorfmann joined the production and was given the distribution rights for Europe. According to Kroonenburg the deal with China was worth $3–4 million and aided in filming the movie in five provinces. Chinese screenwriter Li Bai edited the script.

Kroonenburg and Clermont were interested in having a European coproducer. Leo Pescarolo, an Italian producer whose brother-in-law worked on the Marco Polo miniseries in China, was interested in the project, but was unable to work out a deal. Dorfmann was making A Woman of Shanghai in China, but needed funding. Dorfmann agreed to become a minority coproducer for Bethune in exchange for Kroonenburg and Clermont being minority coproducers for his film.

Jewison considered directing the film, but was unable to due to scheduling conflicts with Moonstruck. Sidney J. Furie was offered the position, but stated that he could only do it if the film was delayed. Kotcheff was attached to direct the film, but left due to payment disputes after only being offered $500,000. Kotcheff also believed that the film's budget was not high enough and would encounter similar problems to Joshua Then and Now. Sutherland proposed Ralph L. Thomas, a friend of his and who directed a film he starred in. Thomas stated that the script needed major changes. In January 1987, Phillip Borsos, who had been out of work for eighteen months and multiple recent projects cancelled, was selected to direct.

In the 1940s Darryl F. Zanuck wanted Walter Pidgeon to play Bethune, Pidgeon later portrayed him in a radio drama. Sean Connery, Richard Dreyfuss, Christopher Plummer, and Redford were interested in playing Bethune, but Donald Sutherland, who previously played Bethune in a CBC Television movie, was selected. Sutherland previously attempted to create a $40 million film based on Roderick Stewart's Bethune biography with Gillo Pontecorvo directing.

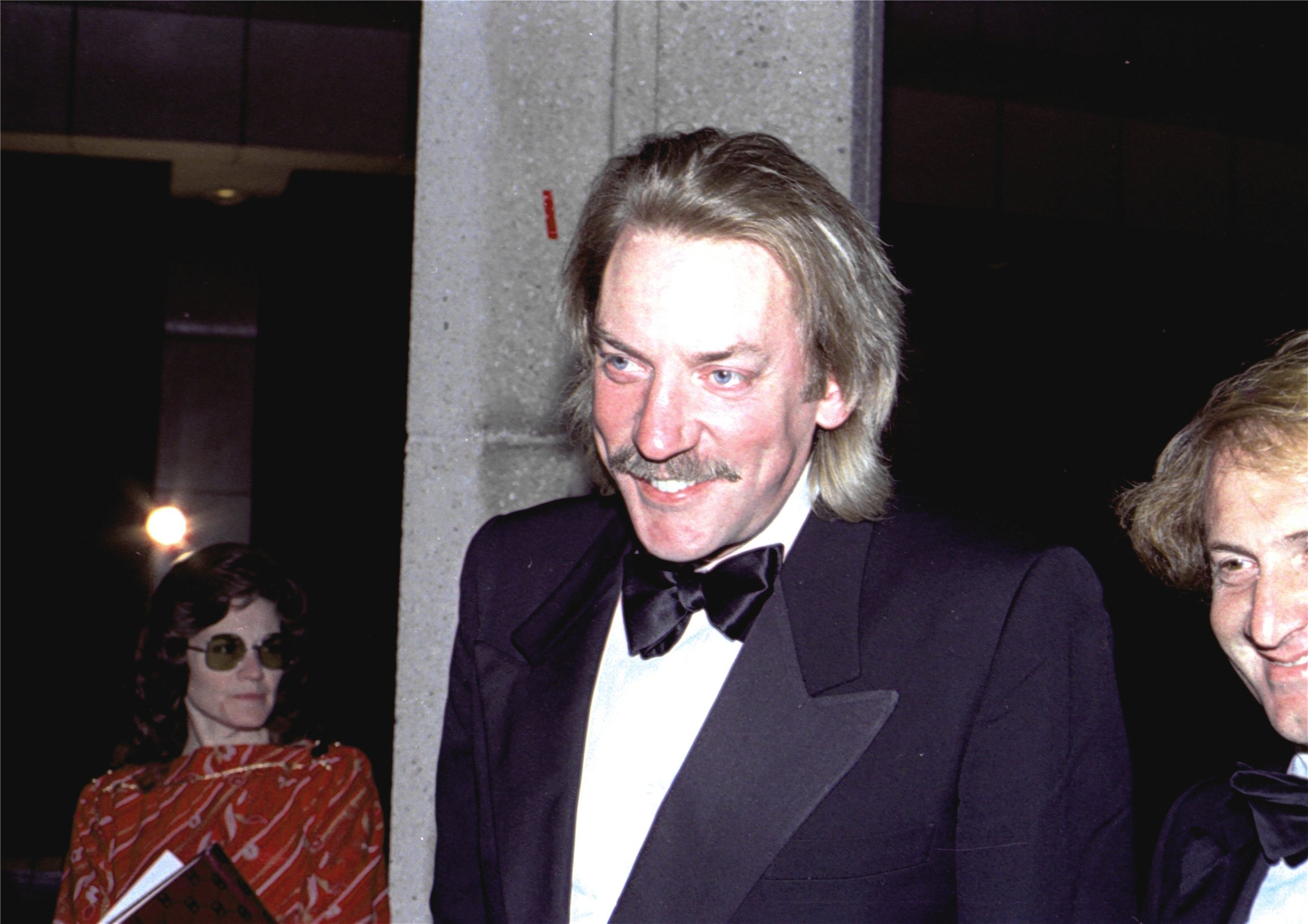
Donald Sutherland was the actor who played Bethune

An agreement in 1986 divided the budget with $5 million coming from Canada, $3 million from China, and $2 million from France. An agreement signed by Minister of Communications Flora MacDonald and Ai Zhisheng on 23 February 1987, listed the budget of the film as $13.5 million. Hemdale Film Corporation bought the United States distribution rights for $2.5 million and Telefilm invested $8.2 million. The film's budget rose from $11 million to between $15–20 million. It was the most expensive film in Canadian history at the time until Shadow of the Wolf.

=== Shooting ===
The film was in production for five years. The film was shot in China from 15 April to 4 August 1987, although filming was halted for one week in May due to the Canadian production crew protesting the poor working conditions. The protest increased the film's budget by $50,000. Further production was halted for a year due to financial problems until Telefilm granted another $2.5 million to the production. Jane Birkin was initially cast to play Frances Bethune, but was unavailable for shooting in Spain and was replaced by Helen Mirren. Shooting was completed in Canada and Spain by 23 December 1988. MacDonald ordered Telefilm to complete the movie at any cost, but the Canadian government's support for the film waned after the Tiananmen Square Massacre.

Bob McKeown produced Strangers in a Strange Land, a documentary about the filming of Bethune: The Making of a Hero in China, and it was shown at the 1988 Toronto International Film Festival. The film cost $200,000, with Filmline and the documentary producers evenly dividing the cost. Filmline refused to approve the documentary airing on television as they felt it was too negative.

Communication issues between the English and Chinese speaking crew troubled the production. Neil Trifunovich, the special effects coordinator, stated that "The Chinese couldn’t understand why we would not blow up a real mule. They wanted to put explosives on the side of the animal’s head." when they were filming a scene of an artillery attack on a mule train. 2,000 extras from villages in Wutai County were used for Bethune's funeral scene.

A Japanese plane could not be found in China for a scene of an attack against Bethune's caravan, but was found in Canada. However, the Chinese could not find somebody to fly it and a foreign pilot would not be allowed to fly over a military sensitive area. A model plane, that arrived months late, was given to the production, but it was destroyed in a test flight. Sutherland stated "Thankfully, the pilot was unhurt".

Allan criticized Sutherland for wanting the script rewritten and that he was "egomaniacal". Allan, whose contract with Filmline required his permission to be granted to any script changes, approved Don Miller to be a script doctor while Dennis Clark was hired by Sutherland. Sutherland claimed that "Ted’s script was pretentious and two-dimensional and unplayable" and that the script was rewritten by Dennis Clark, one of the three uncredited writers. Clark also claimed that he wrote the film and stated that "Contractually, I shouldn’t be talking to you, but the producers haven’t paid me for my last year of work, so I have no qualms about it", as he was still owed $30,000 for his work on the film. Borsos stated that there were thirty-three drafts of the film, and that Clark wrote most of the film. Clermont stated that Clark's claims were "totally ridiculous" and that he should either file a union grievance or "shut up".

=== Editing ===
The edit proposed by Borsos, telling the film in chronological order, was rejected by the producers, Telefilm, and Canadian Broadcasting Corporation in September 1989. The film was instead edited, without the involvement of Borsos, to be shown as a series of flashbacks. Borsos' version of the film was 150 minutes long while the version accepted by the producers was 116 minutes long.

== Release ==
The film was initially planned to be shown at the 1988 Cannes Film Festival and theatrically released in late 1988. Clermont later hoped to have the film shown at the 1988 Toronto International Film Festival. The film was supposed to open the 1989 Montreal World Film Festival, but delays with the musical score shifted it to closing the festival, with Shirley Valentine opening instead, before being removed from the schedule.

The film was not shown at the 1990 Cannes Film Festival as its editing was only finished "10 minutes before" Clermont "got on the plane to Cannes" according to Kroonenburg. The film was shown to around 250 people at a theatre in Cannes, but journalists were not allowed in. The film premiered at the 1990 Montreal World Film Festival on 27 August. Around $2 million was spent by Filmstar on advertising the movie. The film was unsuccessful at the box office, grossing less than $400,000 during its theatrical run. The film was re-edited and aired on television as a two-part four-hour miniseries on 1–2 January 1992.

As late as 2008, circulation for the movie was limited, to the point where a copy could not be found for a tribute to Sutherland. Beret Borsos, Phillip's widow, sought to get the rights to the film in later years.

== Reception ==
Marc Horton gave the film 3 stars in his review for the Edmonton Journal, in which he praised Sutherland's performance, but criticized the fast pace of the theatrical cut and how much it jumped from location to location. Stephen Holden, writing in The New York Times, was critical of the film's non-chronological presentation and for placing Bethune's time in Spain late in the film despite it occurring before his time in China. Bob Remington, reviewing the miniseries in the Edmonton Journal, stated that it was not a significant improvement from the theatrical release and was "more drawn out than Mao's Long March".

Noel Taylor praised the film's visuals and usage of landscapes in his four star review in the Ottawa Citizen The Oregonian's 2½ star review praised the location shooting, but noted that Sutherland did not feel like Bethune and that the film was "more educational than dramatic". The film's photography and Sutherland's performance was praised by John Levesque in The Hamilton Spectator. Bob Campbell, writing in The Star-Ledger, gave the film two stars in his review which criticized the scenes in Montreal as "cramped, dull and artificial" and in Spain as "stiff and sketchy", but praised the scenes in China as the best part of the film.

Kevin Thomas, writing in the Los Angeles Times, stated that the film was "an often absorbing and intelligent film biography, boasts one of Donald Sutherland’s best portrayals". Christopher Johnston, writing in The Canadian Press, praised Sutherland's acting, but criticized the lack of scenes depicting his childhood and not enough focus being placed on his relationship with her wife. Dave Kehr, writing in the New York Daily News, gave the film one star and compared it to other "overstuffed biographies" like The Story of Alexander Graham Bell (1939) and Wilson (1944). Robert W. Butler, writing in The Kansas City Star, gave the film 2½ stars and stated that it was more of a history lesson rather than a compelling film.

== Accolades ==
Award	Date of ceremony	Category	Recipient(s)	Result	Ref.
10th Atlantic International Film Festival	1990	Best Feature Film	Bethune: The Making of a Hero	Won	
10th Atlantic International Film Festival	1990	Best Set Design	Bethune: The Making of a Hero	Won	
10th Atlantic International Film Festival	1990	Best Art Direction	Enrique Alarcon	Won	
10th Atlantic International Film Festival	1990	Best Director	Phillip Borsos	Won	
10th Atlantic International Film Festival	1990	Best Costume Design	Olga Dimitrov	Won	
12th Genie Awards	26 November 1991	Best Art Direction	Bethune: The Making of a Hero	Nominated	
12th Genie Awards	26 November 1991	Best Costume Design	Bethune: The Making of a Hero	Won	
12th Genie Awards	26 November 1991	Best Director	Phillip Borsos	Nominated	
12th Genie Awards	26 November 1991	Best Cinematography	Raoul Coutard; Mike Molloy	Nominated	

== Works cited ==
- Beard, William; White, Jerry (2002). North of everything: English-Canadian Cinema Since 1980. The University of Alberta Press. ISBN 0-88864-398-5.
- Knelman, Martin (1987). Home Movies: Tales from the Canadian Film World. Key Porter Books. ISBN 1550130498.
- Spencer, Michael (2003). Hollywood North: Creating the Canadian Motion Picture Industry. Cantos International Publishing. ISBN 289594007X.
- Wise, Wyndham, ed. (2001). Take One's Essential Guide to Canadian film. University of Toronto Press. ISBN 0802035124.
- Wise, Wyndham (1989). "The Bethune myth: Man and movie". Cinema Canada.
