= Windsor Protocol =

1997 British-Canadian thriller film

- VHS cover art
- Directed by: George Mihalka
- Written by: David Preston; Morrie Ruvinsky; Stephen Zoller
- Produced by: Robin Spry; Robert Wertheimer; Paul E. Painter; Jim Howell; Jim Reeve
- Starring: Kyle MacLachlan
- Cinematography: Peter Benison
- Edited by: David R. McLeod, Simon Webb
- Music by: Stanislas Syrewicz
- Release date: 1997
- Running time: Netherlands:96 min, Canada:95 min
- Country: UK / Canada
- Language: English

Windsor Protocol is a 1997 British-Canadian television thriller film directed by George Mihalka and starring Kyle MacLachlan. It is "inspired by the characters created by Jack Higgins", particularly Sean Dillon. The Windsor Protocol is a list created by Adolf Hitler that will help revive the Nazi party; Dillon must find it before it falls into the wrong hands.

== Cast ==
- Kyle MacLachlan as Sean Dillon
- Macha Grenon as Catherine
- Chris Wiggins as Sir Charles Ferguson
- Lisa Bronwyn Moore as Lenny
- John Colicos as Gerhardt Heinzer / Albert Greenfield
- Eugene Clark as Vice President Anson Powers

== Production ==
It was followed by Thunder Point (1998), also starring Kyle MacLachlan as Sean Dillon and Chris Wiggins as Sir Charles Ferguson.
