= Jean LeClerc (actor) =

Canadian actor

- Born: July 7, 1945 (age 80); Montreal, Quebec, Canada
- Occupation: Actor

Jean LeClerc (French pronunciation: [ʒɑ̃ ləklɛʁ]; born July 7, 1945) is a Canadian actor best known for his work in the United States as Jeremy Hunter on the American daytime soap operas All My Children and Loving in the 1980s and 1990s.

== Career ==
LeClerc first started his career in Quebec on the television series Les Belles Histoires des pays d'en haut. Roles in Québécois movies followed, culminating in his first English-speaking role in the 1976 Canadian film, Strange Shadows in an Empty Room. That same year, he acted in a television miniseries about the life of Sarah Bernhardt, playing the role of Bernhardt's husband Jacques Damala, and the following year he played a film director in the horror anthology film The Uncanny. LeClerc moved to the United States in 1982, playing the part of a French doctor on the soap opera The Doctors. He played similar roles on The Edge of Night and As the World Turns before being offered the role of American Jeremy Hunter in 1985.

In 1991, LeClerc and his All My Children costar Genie Francis made an extended appearance on another ABC soap opera Loving for the November sweeps period in an effort to boost the show's ratings. LeClerc left All My Children in 1992 to join Loving full-time until his character was killed off in 1995. In 2001, LeClerc briefly reappeared on All My Children, with his character Jeremy appearing as a ghost.

LeClerc most recently appeared in a Patty Duke Show television reunion special and in the 2005 film Idole instantanée. He also appeared on Broadway as the title character in a production of Dracula.

== Filmography ==
=== Film ===
Year	Title	Role	Notes
1972	Hold on to Daddy's Ears (Tiens-toi bien après les oreilles à papa)		
1976	Strange Shadows in an Empty Room	Fred	
1977	The Uncanny	Barrington	
1983	The Wars	Captain Taffler	
1990	Whispers	Bruno	
1996	L'Homme idéal	Gilbert	
2005	Idole instantanée	Victor Victor	

=== Television ===
Year	Title	Role	Notes
1968	Les Belles Histoires des pays d'en haut	Raphaël Lacour	Episode: "L'autre péché"
1970	Les enquêteurs associés	Lawrence Fils	Episode: "Hold-up à Montréal"
1975	La Petite Patrie	Gaétan Lamêche	Episode: "La partie de cartes annuelle du collège"
1976	Qui perd gagne	Christian Lajoie	Television film
1976	Faits diver	Ami boîte de nuit	Episode: "Western limitée"
1980	A Time for Miracles	Father Brute	Television film
1981	The Great Detective	Dr. Larocque	Episode: "If Looks Could Kill"
1982	The Greatest American Hero	Azziz	Episode: "Train of Thought"
1982	The Doctors	Dr. Jean-Marc Gautier	3 episodes
1983	T. J. Hooker	Jake Hendricks	Episode: "Payday Pirates"
1983	As the World Turns	Antoine	Episode dated 28 October 1983
1983	The Edge of Night	Gui Tavernier	10 episodes
1984	The Jerk, Too	Count Marco	Television film
1985–1992	All My Children	Jeremy Hunter	237 episodes
1987	Shades of Love: The Garnet Princess	Prince Alexander / Jonathan Tanner	Television film
1989	Piège infernal	François Germain	Miniseries
1991	The Days and Nights of Molly Dodd	Henri	Episode: "Here's One Way to Fill Every Waking Moment"
1991–1995	Loving	Jeremy Hunter / Gilbert Nostrand	461 episodes
1993	Blown Away	Cy	Television film
1999	Time at the Top	Cyrus Sweeney	Television film
1999	The Patty Duke Show: Still Rockin' in Brooklyn Heights	Hank Elway	Television film
2000	Law & Order	Dr. Martin Alvarez	Episode: "Trade This"
2000	Are You Afraid of the Dark?	Mr. Doyle	Episode: "The Tale of the Reanimator"
2000	Canada: A People's History	Miles Macdonell	Television film
2001	All Souls	Dr. Dante Ambrosius	5 episodes
2005	Les Bougon	Comédien 'Papa'	Episode: "TV"
2022	Great Performances	Jacques Damala	Episode: "Sarah"
