= Rough Justice (novel) =

2008 novel written by Jack Higgins

- First edition (UK)
- Author: Jack Higgins
- Series: Sean Dillon
- Genre: Thriller
- Publisher: HarperCollins
- Publication date: August 19, 2008
- Pages: 336
- ISBN: 978-0-399-15513-0
- OCLC: 212893606
- Dewey Decimal: 823/.914 22
- LC Class: PR6058.I343 R68 2008
- Preceded by: The Killing Ground

Rough Justice is a 2008 novel written by Jack Higgins. It appeared on The New York Times Best Seller list in September 2008, debuting at number 15. The novel features Higgins' regular Sean Dillon, along with both American and British government operatives in a volatile Kosovo, made more so when one puts a bullet through the head of the ring leader of a group of Russian soldiers. While Dillon appears at various points in the story the lead character is an ex-army intelligence officer, Major Harry Miller M.P. who holds a position of Under-Secretary of State answerable to the British prime minister.
