= The Blue Man (film) =

1985 film

- A poster bearing the film's most commonly used title: Eternal Evil
- Directed by: George Mihalka
- Written by: Robert Geoffrion
- Produced by: Buck Houghton; Pieter Kroonenburg
- Starring: Winston Rekert; Karen Black; John Novak; Patty Talbot
- Cinematography: Paul Van der Linden
- Edited by: Yves Langlois; Nick Rotundo
- Music by: Marvin Dolgay
- Release date: 1985
- Running time: 85 minutes
- Country: Canada
- Language: English

The Blue Man (also known as Eternal Evil) is a 1985 Canadian horror film directed by George Mihalka and starring Winston Rekert, Karen Black, John Novak, and Patty Talbot.

== Premise ==
A dissatisfied Montreal director of TV commercials is taught to astrally project himself by a mysterious woman. But soon, he finds that he does it against his will when he sleeps, and while he does it, he commits savage acts against those in his life.

== Cast ==
- Winston Rekert as Paul Sharpe
- Karen Black as Janus
- John Novak as Kauffman
- Patty Talbot as Jennifer Sharpe
- Vlasta Vrána as Scott
- Andrew Bednarski as Matthew Sharpe
- Bronwen Booth as Isis
- Tom Rack as Dr. Meister
- Joanne Côté as Helen
- Philip Spensley as Bill Pearson
- Ron Lea as Mick
- Len Watt as Dr. Morton
- Michael Sinelnikoff as William Duval
- Lois Maxwell as Monica Duval
- Anthony Sherwood as Jensen
- Walter Massey as John Westmore

== Release ==
The Blue Man had a limited release during the 1986 holiday season. The film won the Prix du public at the Avoriaz horror film festival in January 1987 and was nominated for two Genie Awards: Winston Rekert for Best Actor and Marvin Dolgay for Best Score.

The film received a retrospective screening at the 2017 Fantasia Film Festival.
