= Lisa Bronwyn Moore =

Canadian actress

- Born: July 11, 1965 (age 59)
- Occupation: Actress
- Years active: 1994–present

Lisa Bronwyn Moore is a Canadian actress who has worked extensively in film and television.

She had supporting roles in the movies Windsor Protocol, The Legend of Sleepy Hollow, The Courage To Love and Heart: The Marilyn Bell Story.

She has also appeared in films such as Rainbow, Bleeders, The Education of Little Tree, Isn't She Great, Possible Worlds, The Sum of All Fears, The Aviator and I'm Not There. Her stage roles included the 1993 production of Peter Cureton's Passages.
