= Thunder Point =

1993 novel by Jack Higgins

- First edition (UK)
- Author: Jack Higgins
- Language: English
- Genre: Thriller novel
- Publisher: Michael Joseph (UK); Putnam (US)
- Publication date: 1993
- Publication place: United Kingdom
- Media type: Print (hardback and paperback)
- Pages: 308
- ISBN: 0-7181-3745-0

Thunder Point is a novel in the Sean Dillon series by Jack Higgins, published in 1993.

== Plot summary ==
Amateur diver Henry Baker goes diving in the Caribbean, where he finds the wreck of a German U-boat. Inside he finds a briefcase which he takes back home with him. On his way home he meets his friend, diver Bob Carney, and lies to him about where he's been. When he opens the briefcase he finds a list of documents in German. His inability to read German frustrates him but one name leaps out at him: Martin Bormann. The dates on the diary appear strange to Baker as they seem to indicate that the submarine sailed after the war was over.

His next move is to go to England to see his friend, German speaker and Royal Navy man Garth Travers. Travers translates the documents and can't believe what he's found - information on Nazi sympathizers in the United Kingdom and America. The diary reveals that there's another case with the names still in the submarine. He gets in touch with an old friend of his, Brigadier Charles Ferguson, who works for the Prime Minister. The Prime Minister asks them to come to his office and invites two other men, Simon Carter and Sir Francis Pamer. After their meeting with the Prime Minister, they decide to ask Baker about the location of the submarine. Unfortunately for them, Baker died when he looked the wrong way and got run over by a London Bus.

Pamer discovers from his mother that his father had connections with the fascists during the Second World War. Pamer gets in touch with his Cuban friend Max Santiago for advice. Two men working for Santiago in London break into Travers house. Fortunately, the diary is not there because Ferguson has taken it. The men plant a bug on the phone before they leave (against the wishes of their boss Santiago). Travers' housekeeper comes home and finds the place in a mess. Travers contacts Ferguson. Ferguson is suspicious and asks his assistant inspector Jack Lane to check for bugs in the house.

Travers goes to the airport and picks up Jenny Grant, Baker's friend. They meet with Ferguson and she tells him what she knows but reveals that doesn't include the location of the submarine. Ferguson contacts Carter and Pamer and tells them what he knows. Pamer reveals this to Santiago and he promises to have the girl taken care of.

An IRA gunman and expert diver, Sean Dillon, is in prison in Yugoslavia. Ferguson and Lane visit him. Ferguson reveals to Dillon that he had him set up. Dillon had flown a plane carrying medical supplies to Yugoslavia but it also carried missiles, leading to Dillon being captured by the Serbs. Ferguson offers Dillon a clean slate if he works for them.

Dillon flies back to London with them. Ferguson takes Dillon to meet Simon Carter and Francis Pamer. Carter gets a fright when he finds out who Dillon is. Pamer passes on the information to Santiago. Dillon is with Jenny. Jenny goes for a walk. Jenny gets attacked by the two men working for Santiago but Dillon rescues her. Dillon wounds one of the men and he gives up Santiago's name. Jenny wants to flee to France and Dillon takes her to the airport. One of the men working for Santiago reveals to him that they gave us his name. Santiago orders his men to kill the two men. Dillon reveals to Travers and Ferguson that Jenny has gone to France. Ferguson isn't happy. Santiago flies to the Caribbean and meets up with one of his men, Algaro. He explains that they may have to deal with Dillon.

Dillon goes to the Caribbean and makes contact with Carney. He almost gets run off the road by two of Santiago's men who call out his name. Dillon contacts Ferguson and demands to know how they know his name and how he is there. Carney supplies Dillon with diving gear and takes him for a couple of dives. Dillon also goes to a weapons supplier and buys some weapons. Ferguson arrives and Dillon meets him. Jenny is in bed in France when she wakes up and it occurs to her that she might be able to tell Dillon how to find the submarine. Ferguson and Dillon are talking to Carney in a bar when they get into a fight with Santiago's men. They finally have to tell Carney what's going on. Dillon and Carney go diving. They are followed by Santiago's men. Algaro drops bait in the water and the sharks go mad. The two men survive and come up to the boat. They find a bug on the boat and realise that's how Satiago's men have been following them.

Jenny rings from France to say she thinks she knows where the submarine is. A fisherman hears the conversation and informs Santiago. They go for a meal. They discover from a taxi driver who knows the history of the area that Pamer is the informer and why. They have a meal with Santiago. Outside, Algaro asks the taxi driver what he told them then he kills him. The guys fly back in a sea plane but the plane has been sabotaged by Algaro. They almost get killed but survive. When they get back Ferguson contacts Lane and asks him to investigate Pamer. Santiago discovers that somebody is investigating Pamer. He orders someone to kill Jack lane. Lane gets killed. Jenny comes back and meets up with the guys. She takes them out to Henry's boat. Her theory is that Henry may have kept a log. And she's right. They discover that the submarine is at a place called Thunder Point. Carney expresses surprise because it's a very dangerous place. They decide to go there in the night time and dive at dawn.

Ferguson gets a phone call from London, he discovers Inspector Lane is dead. He vows revenge. Jenny decides to go home herself against the wishes of Bill and Mary. Alvaro and Guerra surprise Jenny when she is back at her house. She is tortured and gives up the information about where the U-boat 180 is located. Alvaro then tries to rape her, in order to protect herself she jumps through the balcony door on the street. The guys do their dive, they manage to get into the submarine and find the case and get out. Santiago gives instructions to Algaro and one of the other guys to get the case. Dillon and Carney go to visit Jenny. She reveals to them that she has been attacked. Dillon swears revenge on Algaro. While they're gone Algaro attacks Ferguson and gets the case back. Dillon goes out to Santiago's ship and gets the case back. He kills Algaro, Solona, and Serra and blows up the ship with Santiago and everybody else on it. They go back to England and confront Pamer. Pamer tries to kill Dillon and ends up getting killed himself. Ferguson offers Dillon a job and Dillon accepts.

== Adaptation ==
Thunder Point was adapted into a 1998 British-Canadian television thriller film directed by George Mihalka and starring Kyle MacLachlan as Sean Dillon, Pascale Bussières as Jenny Baker, Chris Wiggins as Sir Charles Ferguson, and Cedric Smith as Henry Baker.
