= Behind the Mask =

Behind the Mask may refer to:

== Film and television ==
- Behind the Mask (1932 film), a film featuring Boris Karloff
- Behind the Mask (1936 film) or The Man Behind the Mask, a British mystery film by Michael Powell
- Behind the Mask (1946 film), a film starring Kane Richmond as the character The Shadow
- Behind the Mask (1958 film), a film starring Michael Redgrave
- Behind the Mask (1991 film), a documentary film about the Irish Republican Army
- Behind the Mask, a 1997 film featuring Cyril Nri
- Behind the Mask (1999 film), a film starring Donald Sutherland
- Behind the Mask (2002 film), a 2002 unauthorized documentary about Slipknot
- Behind the Mask (2006 film), a documentary about the Animal Liberation Front
- Behind the Mask: The Rise of Leslie Vernon, a 2006 horror film
- Behind the Mask (documentary series), a 2013 documentary series about sports mascots
- Marvel's Behind the Mask, a 2021 documentary film special from Marvel

== Literature ==
- Behind the Mask: My Autobiography, a 2019 book by Tyson Fury
- Behind the Mask, an autobiography by American baseball umpire Dave Pallone
- Behind the Mask: On Sexual Demons, Sacred Mothers, Transvestites, Gangsters, Drifters, and Other Japanese Cultural Heroes, a book by Ian Buruma
- "Behind the Mask", a short story by Lin Carter, included in the collection The Xothic Legend Cycle: The Complete Mythos Fiction of Lin Carter

== Music ==
- Behind the Mask (album) or the title song, by Fleetwood Mac, 1990
- "Behind the Mask" (song), by Yellow Magic Orchestra, 1978; covered by several performers
- "Behind the Mask", a song by Twice from Eyes Wide Open, 2020
- "Behind the Mask", the theme song for the TV series Queen of Swords, performed by Jose Feliciano, 2000

== Other uses ==
- Behind the Mask (NPO), a non-profit African LGBT rights organisation

== See also ==
- Behind a Mask, a novella by Louisa May Alcott
- Behind a Mask (album), a 2013 album by Louna
- The Face Behind the Mask (disambiguation)
