= Donald Sutherland filmography =

List of Donald Sutherland works

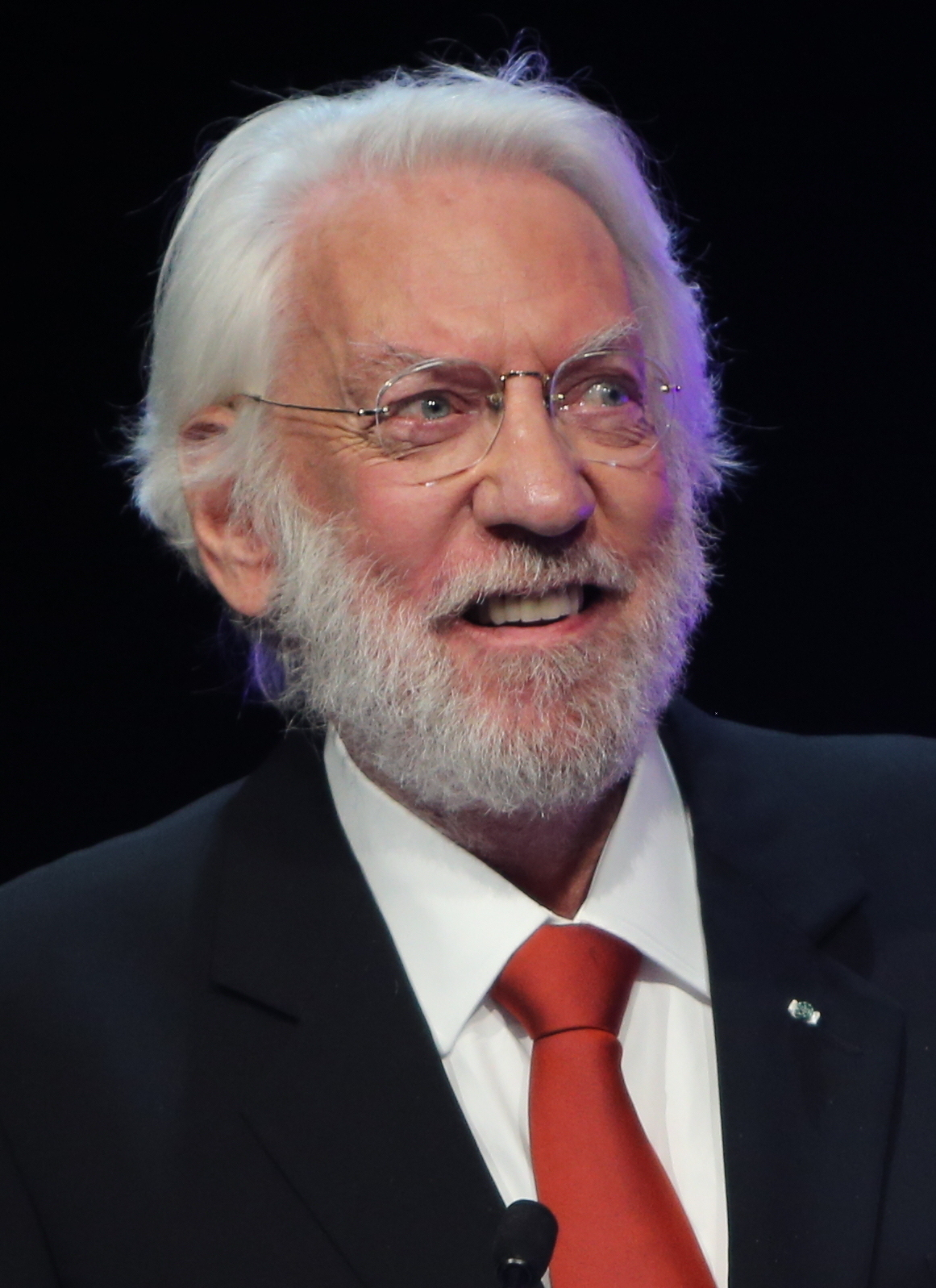
- Film: 141
- Television series: 42
- Music videos: 1
- Theatre: 1

Donald Sutherland (1935–2024) was a Canadian film, television, and stage actor, which spanned over 60 years of his career. He was nominated for eight Golden Globe Awards, winning two for his performances in the television films Citizen X (1995) and Path to War (2002); the former also earned him a Primetime Emmy Award. An inductee of the Hollywood Walk of Fame and Canadian Walk of Fame, he also received a Canadian Academy Award for the drama film Threshold (1981). Multiple film critics and media outlets have cited him as one of the best actors never to have received an Academy Award nomination. In 2017, he received an Academy Honorary Award for his contributions to cinema. In 2021, he won the Critics' Choice Television Award for Best Supporting Actor in a Movie/Miniseries for his work in the HBO miniseries The Undoing (2020).

Sutherland rose to fame after starring in films including The Dirty Dozen (1967), M*A*S*H (1970), Kelly's Heroes (1970), Klute (1971), Don't Look Now (1973), Fellini's Casanova (1976), 1900 (1976), The Eagle Has Landed (1976), Animal House (1978), Invasion of the Body Snatchers (1978), The First Great Train Robbery (1978), Ordinary People (1980), and Eye of the Needle (1981). He later went on to star in many other films where he appeared either in leading or supporting roles such as A Dry White Season (1989), JFK (1991), Outbreak (1995), A Time to Kill (1996), Without Limits (1998), Space Cowboys (2000), Big Shot's Funeral (2001), The Italian Job (2003), Cold Mountain (2003), Pride & Prejudice (2005), Aurora Borealis (2006) and The Hunger Games franchise (2012–2015).

== Film ==
Year	Title	Role	Notes	Ref.
1963	The World Ten Times Over	Tall man in nightclub	Uncredited	
1964	Castle of the Living Dead	Sgt. Paul / The witch / The old man		
1965	Fanatic	Joseph		
1965	Dr. Terror's House of Horrors	Dr. Bob Carroll	Segment: "Vampire"	
1965	The Bedford Incident	Hospitalman Nerney		
1966	Promise Her Anything	Autograph-seeking Father	Uncredited	
1967	Billion Dollar Brain	Scientist at computer		
1967	The Dirty Dozen	Vernon L. Pinkley		
1967	The Shuttered Room	Zebulon Whately (voice)	Dubbed William Devlin	
1968	Sebastian	Ackerman		
1968	Joanna	Lord Peter Sanderson		
1968	The Split	Dave Negli		
1968	Interlude	Lawrence		
1968	Oedipus the King	Chorus Leader		
1970	M*A*S*H	Capt. Benjamin Franklin "Hawkeye" Pierce		
1970	Start the Revolution Without Me	Charles / Pierre		
1970	Kelly's Heroes	Sergeant "Oddball"		
1970	The Act of the Heart	Father Michael Ferrier		
1970	Alex in Wonderland	Alex Morrison		
1971	Little Murders	Rev. Dupas		
1971	Johnny Got His Gun	Christ		
1971	Klute	John Klute		
1973	Steelyard Blues	Jesse Veldini	Also executive producer	
1973	Lady Ice	Andy Hammon		
1973	Don't Look Now	John Baxter		
1974	Alien Thunder	Sergeant Dan Candy		
1974	S*P*Y*S	Bruland		
1975	The Day of the Locust	Homer Simpson		
1975	End of the Game	Corpse of Lt. Robert Schmied		
1976	1900	Attila Mellanchini		
1976	Fellini's Casanova	Giacomo Casanova		
1976	The Eagle Has Landed	Liam Devlin		
1977	The Kentucky Fried Movie	The Clumsy Waiter	Segment: "That's Armageddon"	
1977	The Disappearance	Jay Mallory		
1978	Blood Relatives	Steve Carella		
1978	Animal House	Professor Dave Jennings		
1978	Invasion of the Body Snatchers	Matthew Bennell		
1978	The First Great Train Robbery	Agar		
1979	Murder by Decree	Robert Lees		
1979	A Man, a Woman and a Bank	Reese Halperin		
1979	Bear Island	Frank Lansing		
1980	Ordinary People	Calvin Jarrett		
1980	Nothing Personal	Roger Keller		
1981	Threshold	Dr. Thomas Vrain		
1981	Gas	Nick the Noz		
1981	Eye of the Needle	Henry Faber		
1983	Max Dugan Returns	Officer Brian Costello		
1984	Ordeal by Innocence	Dr. Arthur Calgary		
1984	Crackers	Weslake		
1985	Revolution	Sergeant Major Peasy		
1985	Heaven Help Us	Brother Thadeus		
1986	The Wolf at the Door	Paul Gauguin		
1987	The Trouble with Spies	Appleton Porter		
1987	The Rosary Murders	Father Robert Koesler		
1988	Apprentice to Murder	John Reese		
1989	Lost Angels	Doctor Charles Loftis		
1989	A Dry White Season	Ben du Toit		
1989	Lock Up	Warden Drumgoole		
1990	Buster's Bedroom	O'Connor		
1990	Bethune: The Making of a Hero	Dr. Norman Bethune		
1991	Scream of Stone	Ivan		
1991	JFK	X		
1991	Eminent Domain	Josef Borski		
1991	Backdraft	Ronald Bartel		
1992	The Poky Little Puppy's First Christmas	Narrator (voice)		
1992	The Railway Station Man	Roger Hawthorne		
1992	Buffy the Vampire Slayer	Merrick Jamison-Smythe		
1992	The Setting Sun	John Williams		
1993	Younger and Younger	Jonathan Younger		
1993	Six Degrees of Separation	Flan Kittredge		
1993	Red Hot	Kirov		
1993	Shadow of the Wolf	Henderson		
1993	Benefit of the Doubt	Frank		
1994	The Puppet Masters	Andrew Nivens		
1994	Punch	Craman		
1994	Disclosure	Bob Garvin		
1995	Outbreak	Major General Donald McClintock		
1996	Hollow Point	Garrett Lawton		
1996	A Time to Kill	Lucien Wilbanks		
1997	The Assignment	Jack Shaw		
1997	Shadow Conspiracy	Jacob Conrad		
1998	Free Money	Judge Rolf Rausenberger		
1998	Fallen	Lieutenant Stanton		
1998	Without Limits	Bill Bowerman		
1999	Virus	Captain Robert Everton		
1999	Instinct	Doctor Ben Hillard		
2000	Panic	Michael		
2000	Space Cowboys	Captain Jerry O'Neill		
2000	The Art of War	UN Secretary-General Douglas Thomas		
2001	Final Fantasy: The Spirits Within	Dr. Sid (voice)		
2001	Big Shot's Funeral	Rob Tyler		
2003	The Italian Job	John Bridger		
2003	Five Moons Square	Rosario Sarracino		
2003	Baltic Storm	Lou Aldryn		
2003	Cold Mountain	Reverend Monroe		
2005	Aurora Borealis	Ronald		
2005	Fierce People	Ogden C. Osbourne		
2005	Pride & Prejudice	Mr. Bennet		
2005	American Gun	Carl Wilk		
2005	Lord of War	Colonel Southern (voice)		
2005	An American Haunting	John Bell		
2006	Ask the Dust	Hellfrick		
2006	Beerfest	Johann von Wolfhaus	Uncredited	
2006	Land of the Blind	Thorne		
2007	Reign Over Me	Judge Raines		
2007	Puffball	Lars		
2007	Days of Darkness	Himself		
2008	Fool's Gold	Nigel Honeycutt		
2009	Astro Boy	President Stone (voice)		
2010	The Con Artist	John Kranski		
2011	The Mechanic	Harry McKenna		
2011	The Eagle	Aquila		
2011	Horrible Bosses	Jack Pellitt		
2011	Man on the Train	The Professor		
2011	Jock the Hero Dog	Narrator / Sir Percy Fitzpatrick (voices)		
2012	The Hunger Games	President Coriolanus Snow		
2012	Dawn Rider	Cochrane		
2012	Assassin's Bullet	Ambassador Ashdown		
2013	The Best Offer	Billy Whistler		
2013	The Hunger Games: Catching Fire	President Coriolanus Snow		
2013	Jappeloup	John Lester		
2014	The Calling	Father Price		
2014	The Hunger Games: Mockingjay – Part 1	President Coriolanus Snow		
2015	Forsaken	Rev. Clayton		
2015	The Hunger Games: Mockingjay – Part 2	President Coriolanus Snow		
2016	Milton's Secret	Grandpa Howard		
2017	The Leisure Seeker	John Spencer		
2017	Basmati Blues	Gurgon		
2018	Measure of a Man	Dr. Kahn		
2019	American Hangman	Judge Straight		
2019	Backdraft 2	Ronald Bartel		
2019	Ad Astra	Colonel Thomas Pruitt		
2019	The Burnt Orange Heresy	Jerome Debney		
2020	Alone	Edward		
2021	JFK Revisited: Through the Looking Glass	The Narrator		
2022	Moonfall	Holdenfield		
2022	Mr. Harrigan's Phone	Mr. Harrigan		
2023	Miranda's Victim	Judge Wren		
2023	Ozi: Voice of the Forest	Smiley (voice)		

== Television ==
Year	Title	Role	Notes	Ref.
1962	Studio 4	Switchboard Operator	Episode: "Flight into Danger"	
1963	The Odd Man	Mitch Scott	Episode: "A Pattern of Little Silver Devils"	
1963	The Sentimental Agent	Hotel Clerk	Episode: "A Very Desirable Plot"	
1965	The Sullavan Brothers	Jonathan Vickers	Episode: "The Corrupters"	
1965–1966	The Saint	John Wood / Jim McCleery	2 episodes	
1966	Court Martial	Cpl. Brown	Episode: "All Is a Dream to Me"	
1966	Theatre 625	Union Captain / Priest	2 episodes	
1966	Gideon's Way	Phillip Guest	Episode: "The Millionaires' Daughter"	
1967	The Avengers	Jessel	Episode: "The Superlative Seven"	
1967–1968	Man in a Suitcase	Earle / Willard	2 episodes	
1969	The Champions	David Crayley	Episode: "Shadow of the Panther"	
1969	The Name of the Game	Jerry Trevor	Episode: "The Suntan Mob"	
1996	The Simpsons	Hollis Hurlbut (voice)	Episode: "Lisa the Iconoclast"	
2005–2006	Commander in Chief	Nathan Templeton	Main role	
2007–2009	Dirty Sexy Money	Patrick "Tripp" Darling III	Main role	
2013–2015	Crossing Lines	Michel Dorn	Main role	
2016–2017	Ice	Pieter Van De Bruin	Main role (season 1)	
2018	Trust	J. Paul Getty	Main role	
2020	The Undoing	Franklin Renner	Main role	
2022	Swimming with Sharks	Redmond	Main role	
2023	Lawmen: Bass Reeves	Judge Isaac C. Parker	Main role	

=== TV films, miniseries, and specials ===
Year	Title	Role	Ref.
1964	Hamlet at Elsinore	Prince Fortinbras	
1966	A Farewell to Arms	Sim	
1968	The Sunshine Patriot	Benedeck	
1977	Bethune	Dr. Norman Bethune	
1983	The Winter of Our Discontent	Ethan Allen Hawley	
1992	Quicksand: No Escape	Murdoch	
1994	Oldest Living Confederate Widow Tells All	Captain William Marsden	
1994	The Lifeforce Experiment	Dr. 'MAC' MacLean	
1995	Citizen X	Colonel Mikhail Fetisov	
1996	Natural Enemy	Ted Robards	
1999	Behind the Mask	Dr. Bob Shushan	
1999	The Hunley	Gen. P. G. T. Beauregard	
2001	The Big Heist	Jimmy Burke	
2001	Uprising	Adam Czerniaków	
2002	Path to War	Clark Clifford	
2004	Salem's Lot	Richard Straker	
2004	Frankenstein	Captain Walton	
2005	Human Trafficking	Agent Bill Meehan	
2009	The Eastmans	Dr. Charles Eastman	
2010	The Pillars of the Earth	Earl Bartholomew	
2011	Moby Dick	Father Mapple	
2012	Treasure Island	Captain Flint	
2015	Pirate's Passage	Captain Charles Johnson (voice)	

== Theatre ==
Year	Title	Role	Venue	Notes	Ref.
1960	The Rape of the Belt	Heracles	Webster Theatre, Arbroath		
1960	The Rape of the Belt	Heracles	Perth Theatre, Perth		
1960–1961	Robinson Crusoe	Mate	Perth Theatre, Perth		
1961	Great Expectations	Abel Magwitch	Nottingham Playhouse, Nottingham		
1962	On a Clear Day You Can See Canterbury	Hector	Theatre Royal Stratford East, Newham		
1962	The Gimmick	Del Rio	Ireland and UK tour	West End debut	
1963	Red on White	Bill Higgins	Theatre Royal, Windsor		
1964	Spoon River	Various roles	Royal Court Theatre, London		
1969	Buck White	Black Man / Honey Man	George Abbott Theatre, New York	Broadway debut	
1981	Lolita	Humbert Humbert	Brooks Atkinson Theatre, New York		
2000	Enigma Variations	Abel Znorko	Royal Alexandra Theatre, Toronto		
2000	Enigma Variations	Abel Znorko	Savoy Theatre, London		
2000	Enigma Variations	Abel Znorko	Festival Theatre, Malvern		
2001	Ten Unknowns	Malcolm Raphelson	Mitzi E. Newhouse Theater, New York		

== Music videos ==
Year	Title	Role	Artist
1985	Cloudbusting	Wilhelm Reich	Kate Bush

== Video games ==
Year	Title	Role	Notes
1993	Conspiracy	Rukov's Father	1993 CD-ROM version only

== Documentary appearances ==
Year	Title	Role	Notes	Ref.
1972	F.T.A.	Himself	Also producer	
1980	North China Factory	Narrator (voice)		
1993–2000	Great Books	Narrator (voice)		
2000	Threads of Hope	Narrator (voice)		
2001	Queen Victoria's Empire	Narrator (voice)		
2002	Fellini: I'm a Born Liar	Himself / Giacomo Casanova		
2005	Sir! No Sir!	Himself		
2007	Dinosaurs: Giants of Patagonia	Narrator (voice)		
2007	Trumbo	Himself		
2012	Out of the Shadows	Narrator (voice)		
