= Eye of the Needle (novel) =

WW2 spy thriller novel by Ken Follett

- Author: Kenneth Martin Follett
- Language: English
- Genre: Thriller; Historical Fiction; Spy fiction War story
- Set in: United Kingdom
- Publisher: Macdonald & Jane's
- Publication date: May 1978
- Publication place: United Kingdom
- Pages: 339 pages
- ISBN: 978-0060748159

Eye of the Needle is a spy thriller novel written by Welsh author Ken Follett. It was originally published in 1978 by the Penguin Group under the title Storm Island. This novel was Follett's first successful, best-selling effort as a novelist, and it earned him the 1979 Edgar Award for Best Novel from the Mystery Writers of America. The revised title is an allusion to the "eye of a needle" aphorism.

The book was made into a motion picture of the same title in 1981, starring Donald Sutherland, with a screenplay adapted by Stanley Mann and directed by Richard Marquand.

== Plot summary ==
In 1940, Henry Faber, a German spy nicknamed 'die Nadel' ('The Needle') due to his trademark weapon being a stiletto, is working at a London railway depot, collecting information on Allied troop movements. Faber is halfway through radioing this information to Berlin when his widowed landlady stumbles into his room hoping for intimacy. Faber fears that Mrs. Garden will eventually realise that he was using a transmitter and that he is a spy, so he kills her with his stiletto, then resumes his transmission.

David, a trainee RAF pilot, and his bride Lucy are on their honeymoon when they're involved in a car crash. David loses the use of both his legs. Unable to fly during the Battle of Britain, David grows embittered and he and Lucy retire to the isolated (fictitious) Storm Island off the east coast of Scotland. Lucy later gives birth to their son Jonathan ('Joe'), conceived just before the wedding, but their subsequent relationship remains celibate.

Four years later, MI5 has executed or recruited all German spies in Britain except Faber. A history professor formerly acquainted with Faber, Godliman, and a widowed ex-policeman, Bloggs, are employed by MI5 to catch him. They start with the interrupted broadcast and his codename Die Nadel. They connect the landlady's murder to Faber by him having used his 'needle' during the transmission. They then interview Faber's fellow tenants from 1940. One identifies Faber from a photo of him as a young army officer.

Faber is ordered by Berlin to investigate the First United States Army Group (FUSAG) military base. He takes photos and discovers it is a dummy and has merely been constructed to look real from the air. Several soldiers try to arrest him but he kills them with his stiletto. Realising that FUSAG being fake implies that the D-Day landings will be in Normandy rather than around Calais, Faber heads for Aberdeen, Scotland, where a U-boat will take him and his intelligence back to Germany.

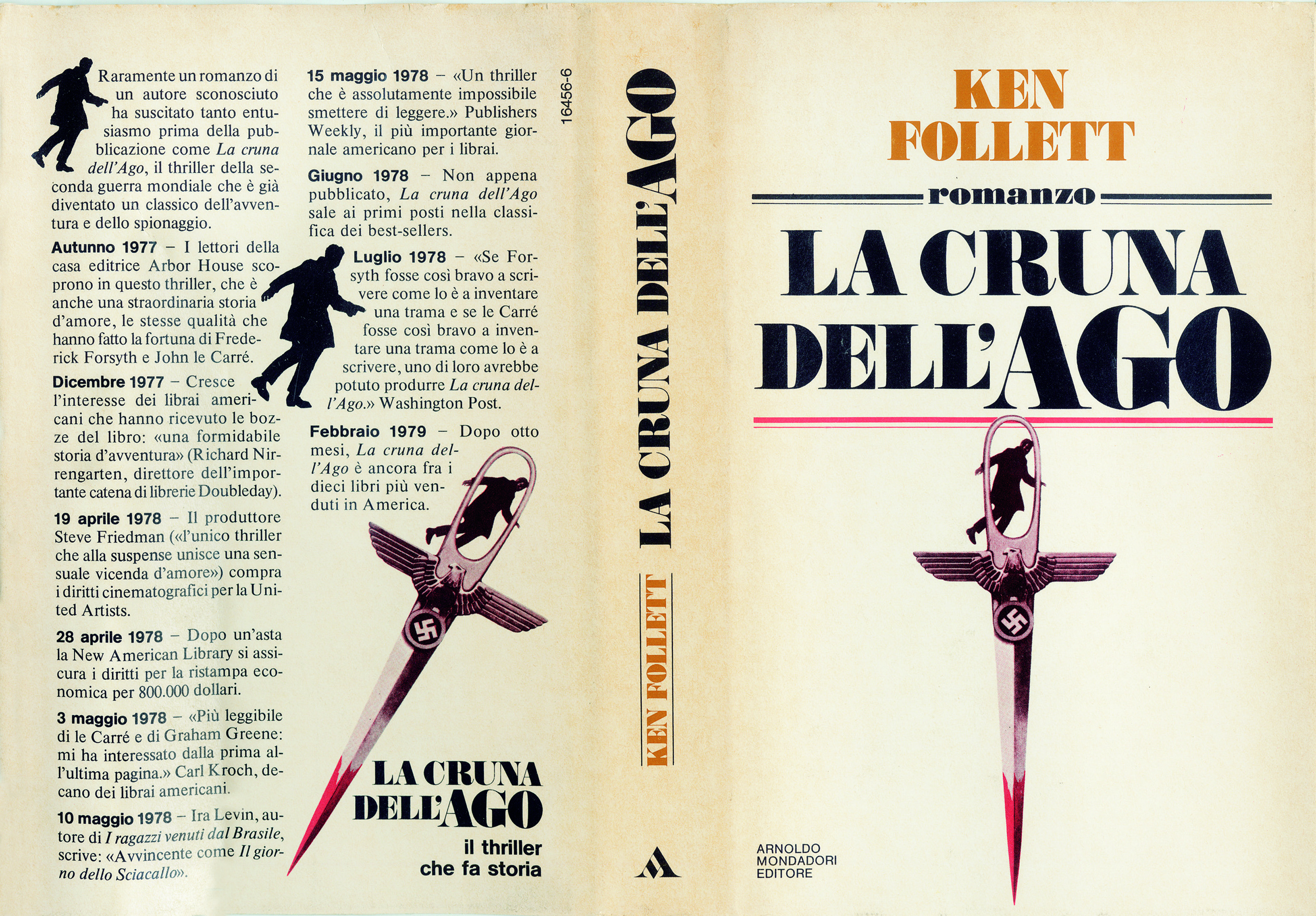
Italian cover of the Eye of the Needle, Mondadori 1979.

Godliman and Bloggs realise what Faber is trying to achieve and chase him across Northern England and Scotland. Faber escapes many times but his repeated killings (intended to prevent people from recognizing his appearance) allow MI5 to track him to Aberdeen. Both Hitler and Churchill are informed that Faber has the critical information. German Field Marshalls Rommel and Von Rundstedt, both already convinced that Normandy is indeed the target, lobby Hitler for several reserve panzer divisions, but Hitler delays making a decision until he receives Faber's intelligence.

In Aberdeen, Faber steals a small trawler and sets out to meet the U-boat. Caught by a fierce storm, he is shipwrecked on Storm Island, collapsing near the isolated house where David, Lucy and Joe live. Lucy nurses him back to health. Stuck in a loveless marriage to the crippled David, she begins a physical relationship with Faber. David soon discovers both Lucy's infidelity and Faber's FUSAG photos. David confronts Faber, but after a struggle Faber kills David by rolling him off a cliff, and tells Lucy it was another accident. However, she discovers her husband's body and realises the truth.

Faber realises he may be caught before leaving the island and so tries to radio the information about FUSAG directly to Germany. Lucy stops him by short-circuiting the electricity in the cottage, injuring herself in the process. By the cold logic which has guided his actions throughout his career, Faber should kill Lucy, but he finds himself unable to do so, being deeply in love with her to the detriment of his mission and of simple self-preservation. Unable to send a radio message, Faber attempts to descend the cliff and swim to the waiting U-boat. Lucy throws a rock down at him, striking him and causing him to lose his balance and fall to his death. An RAF patrol plane then appears and drives the U-boat away. A fictitious radio message is sent with Faber's call code, convincing the Germans that the planned invasion is still targeting Calais and causing Hitler to deny Rommel and Rundstedt the reserve panzer divisions. Bloggs comforts the widowed Lucy, with the epilogue implying that they later married.

== List of characters ==
- Henry Faber – "Die Nadel", also called The Needle, a German spy
- David Rose – young RAF fighter pilot
- Lucy Rose – David Rose's wife
- Billy Parkin – young soldier who identified Faber
- Percival Godliman – history professor, recruited to MI5
- Frederick Bloggs – policeman, seconded to MI5

== Inspiration ==
Operation Fortitude was an Allied counter-intelligence operation run during World War II. Its goal was to convince the German military that the planned D-Day landings were to occur at Calais and not Normandy. As a part of Fortitude the fictitious First United States Army Group (FUSAG) was created. FUSAG used fake tanks, aircraft, buildings and radio traffic to create an illusion of an army being formed to land at Calais. The controversial American General George S. Patton was given command of this 'army' which also influenced the German military. As Follett notes in the foreword to the novel, if the deception had been discovered the invasion of Nazi-occupied Europe would have become more difficult.

== Film reference ==
In the film The Iron Lady there is a scene in which the retired Margaret Thatcher is shown reading Eye of the Needle.

The Bollywood movie Fanaa is loosely based on the book, moved to a contemporary Indian location. The role of the German spy Faber being taken by a Kashmiri separatist militant seeking to gain a nuclear weapon, while the role of Lucy is given to a Kashmiri girl who loves the militant yet ends up killing him. The second half of the film is reportedly inspired by the 1981 movie version of Eye of the Needle.

Another Bollywood movie Right Yaaa Wrong is also loosely based on the book.

== Critical reception ==
On 5 November 2019 BBC News listed Eye of the Needle on its list of the 100 most inspiring novels.

== See also ==
- Operation Fortitude
- First United States Army Group (fictional)
