= The Face Behind the Mask =

The Face Behind the Mask may refer to:

- The Face Behind the Mask (1941 film), an American crime drama starring Peter Lorre
- The Face Behind the Mask (1977 film), a Taiwanese martial arts film directed by Chen Chi-hwa
- The Face Behind the Mask, a 1938 short film directed by Jacques Tourneur

== See also ==
- Behind the Mask (disambiguation)
