= Harry J. Middleton =

American journalist (1921–2017)

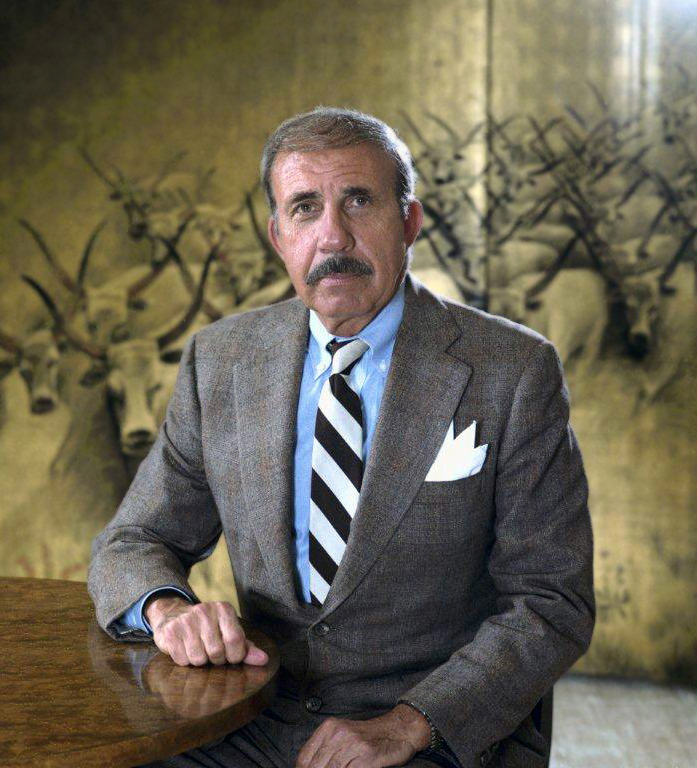
- Born: Harry Joseph Middleton Jr. October 24, 1921; Centerville, Iowa
- Died: January 20, 2017 (aged 95); Austin, Texas
- Education: Washburn University 1941–1943; Louisiana State University B.A., 1947
- Occupations: Presidential speechwriter, author, library director
- Political party: Democratic
- Spouse: Miriam Middleton (m. 1949; died 2004)
- Children: Four

Harry Joseph Middleton Jr. (October 24, 1921 – January 20, 2017) was an American journalist, author, and library director who served as Lyndon B. Johnson's Presidential speech writer and staff assistant from 1967 to 1969. Middleton was also director of the Lyndon Baines Johnson Library and Museum from 1971 until 2002, and led the Lyndon Baines Johnson Foundation from 1993 until 2004.

== Early life and education ==
Harry Middleton was born in Centerville, Iowa, on October 24, 1921. Following two years of study at Washburn University in Topeka, Kansas from 1941 to 1943, he enlisted in the U.S. Army, serving in World War II and later as an officer in the Korean war. He completed his education at Louisiana State University in Baton Rouge, earning a BA in Journalism. In his career as a professional writer, Middleton worked as a reporter for the Associated Press and a news editor for Architectural Forum and published articles and stories in Reader's Digest, Sports Illustrated, Collier's, Cosmopolitan, and Life.

== Working with LBJ ==
It was in 1966, while Middleton was working on a report for the National Advisory Commission on Selective Service, that President Lyndon B. Johnson met Middleton and hired him as a speechwriter. From January 1967 until January 20, 1969, he served as Staff Assistant to President Johnson in the White House, writing speeches for the President and drafting messages to Congress delineating need for new legislation.

Following the inauguration ceremony of Richard Nixon on January 20, 1969, Middleton returned to the LBJ Ranch in Stonewall, Texas, with Lyndon Johnson in the role of Special Assistant to the former President. From 1969 until May 18, 1970, he worked with Johnson on two books: The Choices We Face, (March 1969) and The Vantage Point: Perspectives of the Presidency 1963–1969 (1971). In 1970, Johnson named him the director of the Lyndon Baines Johnson Library and Museum (LBJ Library) on the campus of the University of Texas at Austin. The building and grounds for the LBJ Library, the first to be located on a university campus, were donated by the University of Texas and are operated by the National Archives of the General Services Administration. The Library opened on May 22, 1971 and Middleton was responsible for its direction for the next 31 years until his retirement in 2002. Middleton also served as Executive Director of the Lyndon Baines Johnson Foundation from 1993 until 2004.

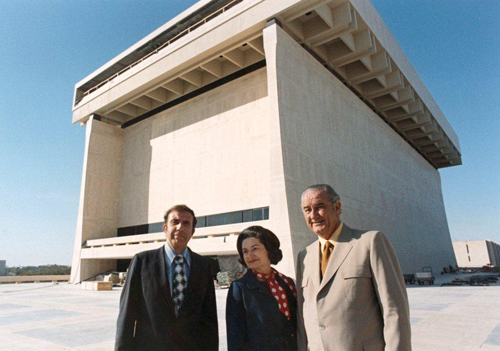
Harry Middleton, Lady Bird Johnson, former President Lyndon Baines Johnson in front of the LBJ Presidential Library in Austin, Texas – March 15, 1971

Although Middleton had no credentials as an archivist, Johnson told him that he was a capable writer and supported his appointment. Historian Michael Beschloss called Middleton "the Joe DiMaggio of Presidential Library directors," Former President Gerald Ford said, "President Johnson would be proud of the leadership Harry has provided...in setting standards that have transformed the Presidential Library system."

In 1971, at Johnson's request, Middleton worked with former National Security Advisor Walt Rostow to prepare a rationale that Johnson could present to President Nixon that would persuade him to expedite declassification of foreign policy documents of Johnson's administration, including documents concerning the Vietnam War. Johnson died before he was able to meet with Nixon. However, under Middleton's direction, the Library established a reputation of leadership in declassification and openness, declassifying and opening hundreds of thousands of pages of historical material.

In 1993, Middleton made the decision to release recordings of the telephone conversations Johnson made throughout his presidency. Although Johnson had stipulated that the recordings be sealed until 50 years after his death (the year 2023), Middleton consulted with the President's widow, Lady Bird Johnson, about releasing them sooner, and she said the decision was his to make. The conversations, most of which were recorded on a Dictaphone machine, cover a variety of issues, including foreign policy, the Vietnam War and peace negotiations, legislation, civil rights, the economy, politics, labor issues, appointments, and press relations. Consequently, 642 hours of secretly taped telephone conversations have been made available to the public, providing insight into Johnson's legislative skills and substantially elevating his historical standing as a president.

== Later life ==
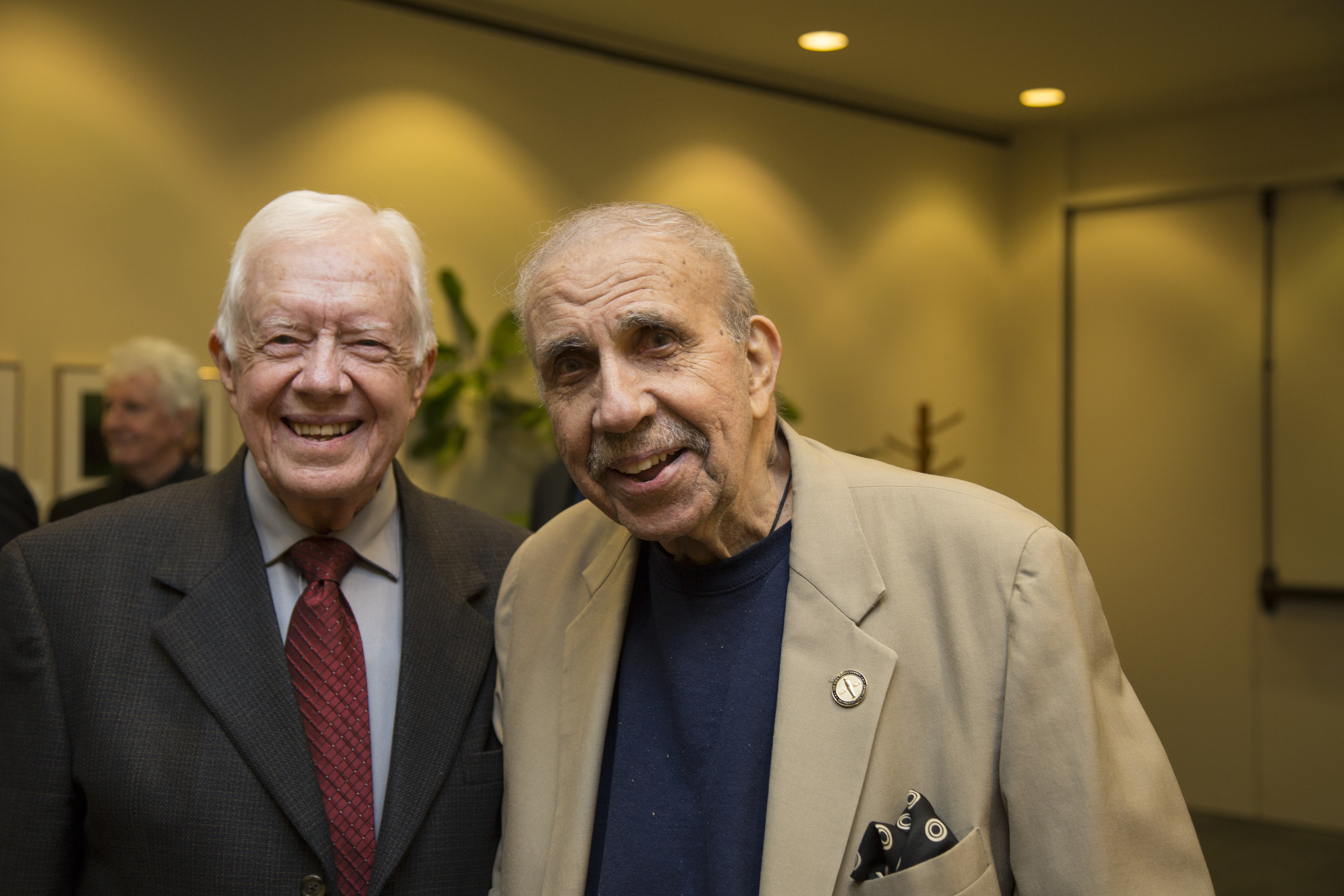
(L-R) Former President Carter with Harry Middleton, former Director of LBJ Presidential Library at the Civil Rights Summit in 2014

Lady Bird Johnson established the Harry Middleton Lectureship in 1994 to honor the career, loyalty and legacy of Middleton and to enrich the learning experiences of UT students and the Austin community. Lecturers include former Soviet President Mikhail Gorbachev, Presidents Jimmy Carter and Gerald Ford, Justice Sandra Day O'Connor, Tom Brokaw, David Mamet, and novelist Jodi Picoult. In 2002, to honor Middleton's contributions to the Presidential Library system and to support scholarly work in Presidential studies, Lady Bird Johnson created the Harry Middleton Fellowship. Each year, the LBJ Foundation appropriates $10,000 - $12,000 to support scholars researching Presidential policy.

From 2004–2013, Middleton taught a class to University of Texas honors students called "The Johnson Years," frequently inviting former members of the Johnson administration to lecture. C-SPAN recorded the final class session in April 2013. On July 14, 2007, Middleton gave a eulogy at Lady Bird Johnson's funeral in Austin, Texas, calling her "a special mix of grace and steel." Middleton died on January 20, 2017.

== Awards ==
Middleton was awarded the Presidential Rank of Meritorious Executive in the Senior Executive Service in 1991. The citation reads: "For sustained superior accomplishment in management of programs of the United States Government and for noteworthy achievement of quality and efficiency in public service." In presenting the award, Don W. Wilson, Archivist of the United States, cited Mr. Middleton's leadership in expanding the "cultural, educational, and archival activities in a time of shrinking Federal resources. This has been accomplished through an unusually effective private partnership with the Lyndon B. Johnson Foundation." Middleton also received the Anti-Defamation League's Torch of Liberty Award, and The University of Texas Presidential Citation.

== Publications ==
- Pax (1958) with Warren Kiefer, OCLC 1449867
- The Compact History of the Korean War (1962), OCLC 412586
- LBJ: The White House Years (1990), ISBN 9780810911918
- Lady Bird Johnson: A Life Well Lived (1992), OCLC 33444179
