= Lumière (film) =

- Theatrical release poster
- Directed by: Jeanne Moreau
- Screenplay by: Jeanne Moreau
- Produced by: Claire Duval
- Starring: Lucia Bosè; Francine Racette; Keith Carradine; Jeanne Moreau; François Simon; Bruno Ganz; Niels Arestrup; Francis Huster
- Cinematography: Ricardo Aronovich
- Edited by: Albert Jurgenson
- Music by: Astor Piazzolla
- Distributed by: Gaumont Distribution
- Release date: 24 March 1976
- Running time: 95 minutes
- Country: France
- Language: French

Lumière (English: Light) is a French drama film written and directed by Jeanne Moreau. The semi-autobiographical film is about the friendship between four actresses. It is credited as being one of the first films to focus on female friendship.

== Plot ==
Sarah is an actress who is nearing 40. She invites Laura, her best friend of the past sixteen years, along with two other women, Caroline and Julienne, to a vacation retreat in Provence. Each woman is at a critical point in her life; Sarah has broken up with her longtime partner, while Laura is pregnant but her husband is carrying on an affair with another woman. Caroline is in an unhappy relationship, and Julienne is being pursued by an American actor.

== Cast ==
- Lucia Bosè as Laura
- Francine Racette as Julienne
- Caroline Cartier as Caroline
- Jeanne Moreau as Sarah
- Keith Carradine as David
- François Simon as Grégoire
- Bruno Ganz as Heinrich Grün
- René Féret as Julien
- Niels Arestrup as Nano
- Francis Huster as Thomas
- Patrice Alexsandre as Pétard
- Jacques Spiesser as Saint-Loup
- Chloé Caillat as Marie
- Marie Henriau as Flora
- Hermine Karagheuz as Camille
- Carole Lange as Carole (credited as Carole Achache)
- Paul Bisciglia as The Candle

== Release ==
Lumière was screened as one of the three French films at the 1976 Toronto International Film Festival. Following screening, the film was released by the New World Pictures.

On 16 March 2023, The Criterion Collection screened Lumière, The Adolescent and Lillian Gish at the Film Forum.

In 2023, Carlotta Films sold the distribution rights to Japan, who released Lumière, The Adolescent and Lillian Gish under an umbrella name Jeanne Moreau, Filmmaker.

In 2024, Jeanne Moreau, Filmmaker was released on Blu-ray.

== Reception ==
Lumière received mixed reviews. On review aggregator website Rotten Tomatoes, Lumière has an approval rating of 60% based on 5 reviews.

Critic Roger Ebert gave a thumb down to the film, while offering some positive comments: "It begins with too many fancy visual touches .... Miss Moreau is trying too hard in her directorial debut. But then, as the strands of her story become clear and we begin to know the characters, the movie grows into a simple and strong emotional statement."

In a retrospective review, Richard Brody of The New Yorker wrote,

Working with the cinematographer Ricardo Aronovich, [Moreau] develops a gliding, peering, shifting aesthetic to match the glossy surfaces with which she conveys shuddering depths of feeling. The camera roves around the actors, capturing the agitation within their controlled gestures, suggesting the elegance of leisure and luxury within which high adventures of passion, pleasure, and power—of self-creation and self-definition—play out.

== Accolades ==
Year	Award	Category	Recipient	Result
1976	Chicago International Film Festival	Grand Prize (Best Feature)	Jeanne Moreau	Nominated
1976	Taormina Film Fest	Golden Charybdis	Jeanne Moreau	Nominated
1977	César Award	Best Supporting Actress	Francine Racette	Nominated
