= Castle of the Living Dead =

1964 film by Warren Kiefer

- Italian film poster
- Italian: Il castello dei morti vivi
- Directed by: Warren Kiefer
- Screenplay by: Warren Kiefer
- Story by: Warren Kiefer; Paul Maslansky
- Produced by: Paul Maslansky
- Starring: Christopher Lee; Gaia Germani; Philippe Leroy; Mirko Valentin; Donald Sutherland
- Cinematography: Aldo Tonti
- Edited by: Mario Serandrei
- Music by: Angelo Francesco Lavagnino
- Production companies: Serena Film; Filmsonor
- Distributed by: Cineriz (Italy)
- Release date: 5 August 1964 (Italy)
- Running time: 90 minutes
- Countries: Italy; France
- Languages: English; Italian
- Box office: ₤103.5 million

Castle of the Living Dead (Note: English title card appears as The Castle of the Living Dead) (Italian: Il castello dei morti vivi, also released Crypt of Horror) is a 1964 horror film written and directed by Warren Kiefer, and starring Christopher Lee, Gaia Germani, Philippe Leroy, Mirko Valentin, and Donald Sutherland. It was Sutherland's first credited film appearance, and Kiefer's directorial debut. The film was an international co-production between Italian and French companies, and premiered in Italy on August 5, 1964.

Since its release, a number of contradictory production histories concerning Castle of the Living Dead have surfaced, with the film's direction being variously attributed to Kiefer (who was credited with the alias "Lorenzo Sabatini" on Italian prints), Riccardo Freda, or Luciano Ricci (credited as "Herbert Wise"). Other mysteries include the extent of assistant director Michael Reeves' involvement in the production, and whether or not Mario Bava provided special effects for the film.

== Plot ==
The film is set in France in the early 19th century, after the Napoleonic Wars (1803 – 1815). The voiceover reports that banditry and violence rule the roadways. An ill-fated theatrical troupe of commedia dell'arte performers on tour visits the castle of Count Drago.

Drago is an embalmer of both animals and humans. He is pre-occupied with creating his "eternal theatre." In his research, Drago discovers a chemical formula that instantly kills and embalms any living creature, forever preserving them at the moment of death. Drago's habit of experimenting on animals is revealed, and the visitors are about to become unwilling participants before a dwarf rescues them.

== Cast ==
- Christopher Lee as Count Drago
- Gaia Germani as Laura
- Philippe Leroy as Eric
- Mirko Valentin as Sandro
- Donald Sutherland as Sgt. Paul / the witch / the old man
- Antonio De Martino as Nick
- Luciano Pigozzi as Dart
- Luigi Bonos as Marc
- Ennio Antonelli as Gianni
- Jacques Stany as Bruno
- Renato Terra Caizzi as policeman

== Production ==
=== Background ===
American Warren Kiefer moved to Italy to pursue a career in the film industry. There he met American-born producer Paul Maslansky at Cinecittà. The two got along and decided to make a film together. Kiefer provided the script for Castle of the Living Dead. Maslansky previously worked as a production manager, and had befriended Michael Reeves. Maslansky had already created a documentary film about jazz music in Paris, financed by his uncle. He was in Rome in order to set up his own feature film, and this time he intended to finance it with his own money. Maslansky had the idea that his film should be a black-and-white horror film. It could be filmed quickly, using ready-made sets, and relying on atmospheric location shooting. The script could be redrafted to incorporate local color, without increasing the production budget. Kiefer was a writer by profession, but aspired to be a film director. He was involved in the shooting of a documentary film in Libya, at the time he met Maslansky. Both of them were expatriate Americans, members of a loosely organized community of expatriate filmmakers in Rome. They were both in their late 20s at the time, and both aspired to create their own feature film. They agreed to co-operate and jointly "thrashed out" the film's story. With the story completed, Kiefer started work on the screenplay. Maslansky "put together" an estimated US$125,000 to $150,000, to serve as a "minestone" fund that would cover the film's budget. Money was drawn from several European countries, based on pre-sales.

Among the crew of Castle of the Living Dead was Michael Reeves. Paul Maslansky met Reeves previously on the set of The Long Ships (1964) and invited him to work on Castle of the Living Dead. Maslansky had been impressed by Reeves's enthusiasm for film and his passion for the horror genre. Reeves was assigned as the second unit director. Reeves is sometimes credited with doing script work for this film. However Kiefer had mostly completed the script by the time production begun. Reeves could not have contributed more than slight redrafting of the script. Reeves' input on the script is credited with the dwarf's role in the finished film.

Donald Sutherland was cast in multiple roles in the film. Maslansky had "spotted" Sutherland in London, where the actor was involved in a production of Spoon River Anthology by Lindsay Anderson at the Royal Court Theatre. Maslansky pitched the film to Sutherland. Sutherland was offered a weekly wage of $40, and the use of Kiefer's couch as a sleeping place. Once he accepted, Maslansky bought him a train ticket for Rome. The film proved Sutherland's credited film debut (he previously had an uncredited bit part in The World Ten Times Over). Maslansky and Reeves put in $10,000 and contacted Christopher Lee for ten days of shooting.

=== Production and director ===
Many sources cite Lorenzo Sabatini as the director of Castle of the Living Dead, but the name was created by Kiefer for tax reasons while creating the film. To complicate it further, the film was a French-Italian co-production, which meant that an Italian director was required to collect certain state subsidies. In the Italian version of the film, Kiefer is credited as only for the story and script while the name Herbert Wise was used as the director. Wise was a pseudonym for Luciano Ricci, Kiefer's assistant director. All other prints credit Kiefer as the sole director. Many promotional materials and reviews of the film since the release have credited various directors as the director, including Ricci, the fictional Wise, and Riccardo Freda.

Reeves is credited as an assistant director on the film, but rumours have spread since his premature death that he had done more on the film, including that he had shot all the sequences at the Parco dei Mostri. Others have said that he took over the production nine days into shooting the film. Maslansky stated in 1999 that the rumours of Reeves directing the film were untrue and that he remained on second unit for the entire film. Kiefer's 2nd unit director Frederick Muller that the film was entirely directed by Kiefer without Reeves' presence. Kiefer also stated that Reeves had not had anything to do with the directing in the film.

The film was shot in five weeks at Castello Orsini-Odescalchi and Bomarzo in Italy. Other sources estimate that the film's shooting lasted for only 24 days. The entire shooting was completed in 1963. The production company was Serena Films, owned by Maslansky. Kiefer estimated the budget as $135,000 while Paul Maslansky stated it was $125,000. To speed up the production, Kiefer and Maslansky set each room they were shooting in the castle in order so after one scene was filmed, the next room in the castle would be ready for the following scene.

In Tim Lucas' book Mario Bava, All the Colours of the Dark, an interview with Luciano Pigozzi states that Mario Bava created a special effect for the film involving a large sailing ship. There is no scene in the film involving boats and Lucas has assumed that this effect would show up when the film was shown at its proper aspect ratio or that the scene had been cut. Muller had later said that he did not recall seeing Mario Bava on the set ever.

=== Post-production ===
Maslansky offered the American distribution rights to American International Pictures (AIP), and the Italian distribution rights to Cineriz. Cineriz went bankrupt before the film could be released in Italy. In most European countries, the film's main selling point was the presence of Christopher Lee in the cast.

There were problems in the film's post-synchronisation process. Initially the film lacked a soundtrack, and the film's continuity sheets were mislaid. The film was eventually dubbed in its entirety. But there were sections of the film where the characters are mouthing words, but the only sounds heard are grunts and groans. Mel Welles oversaw the post-synching process. He later claimed that the lost continuity sheets were simply a ruse, as they intended to improve the film's dialogue.

== Release ==
Castle of the Living Dead was released in Italy through distributor Cineriz on August 5, 1964. The film grossed a total of 103.5 million Italian lira on its theatrical run in Italy. The film was released in 1965 in the United States where it was distributed by The Woolner Brothers.

The film was modestly successful, and did not lose money. Everyone involved was paid, and the investors were "reimbursed".

== Reception ==
From a contemporary review, the Monthly Film Bulletin described the film as "standard Gothic fare, distinguished only by the presence of Christopher Lee as a mad Count"

In a retrospective review, TV Guide gave the film two stars out of five, noting the scenes involving the circus performers' various talents and Donald Sutherland in three different roles.

== See also ==
- Christopher Lee filmography
- Donald Sutherland filmography
- List of French films of 1964
- List of Italian films of 1964
- List of horror films of 1964
