= Francine Racette =

Canadian actress (born 1947)

- Born: September 23, 1947 (age 78); Joliette, Quebec, Canada
- Education: National Theatre School of Canada
- Occupation: Actress
- Years active: 1966–1987
- Spouse: Donald Sutherland (m. 1990; died 2024)
- Children: 3

Francine Racette (born September 23, 1947) is a retired Canadian actress. She is best known for her performances in Au revoir les enfants, Lumière and The Disappearance. She was the third wife of actor Donald Sutherland until his death in 2024 and mother of three of his sons: actor Rossif Sutherland, actor Angus Sutherland, and Roeg Sutherland

Racette was born in Joliette, Quebec. She graduated with a diploma from the National Theatre School of Canada in 1966.

== Filmography ==
- 1960s
  - Le Grand Rock (1969)
- 1970s
  - Reportages sur un squelette ou Masques et bergamasques (1970, TV Movie)
  - Aussi loin que l'amour (1971) as Isabelle
  - Four Flies on Grey Velvet (1971) as Dalia
  - Les vilaines manières (fr) (1973) as Jeanne
  - Alien Thunder (1974) as Emilie Grant
  - Lumière (1976) as Julienne
  - Monsieur Klein (1976) as Françoise / Cathy
  - Un type comme moi ne devrait jamais mourir (fr) (1976) as Suzy Bloom
  - The Disappearance (1977) as Celandine
- 1980s
  - Au revoir les enfants (1987) as Mme. Quentin (final film role)

== Award nomination ==
In 1977, Racette was nominated for a César award for Best Supporting Actress for her role as Julienne in Lumière.
