= Donald Sutherland =

Canadian actor (1935–2024)

Donald Sutherland CC
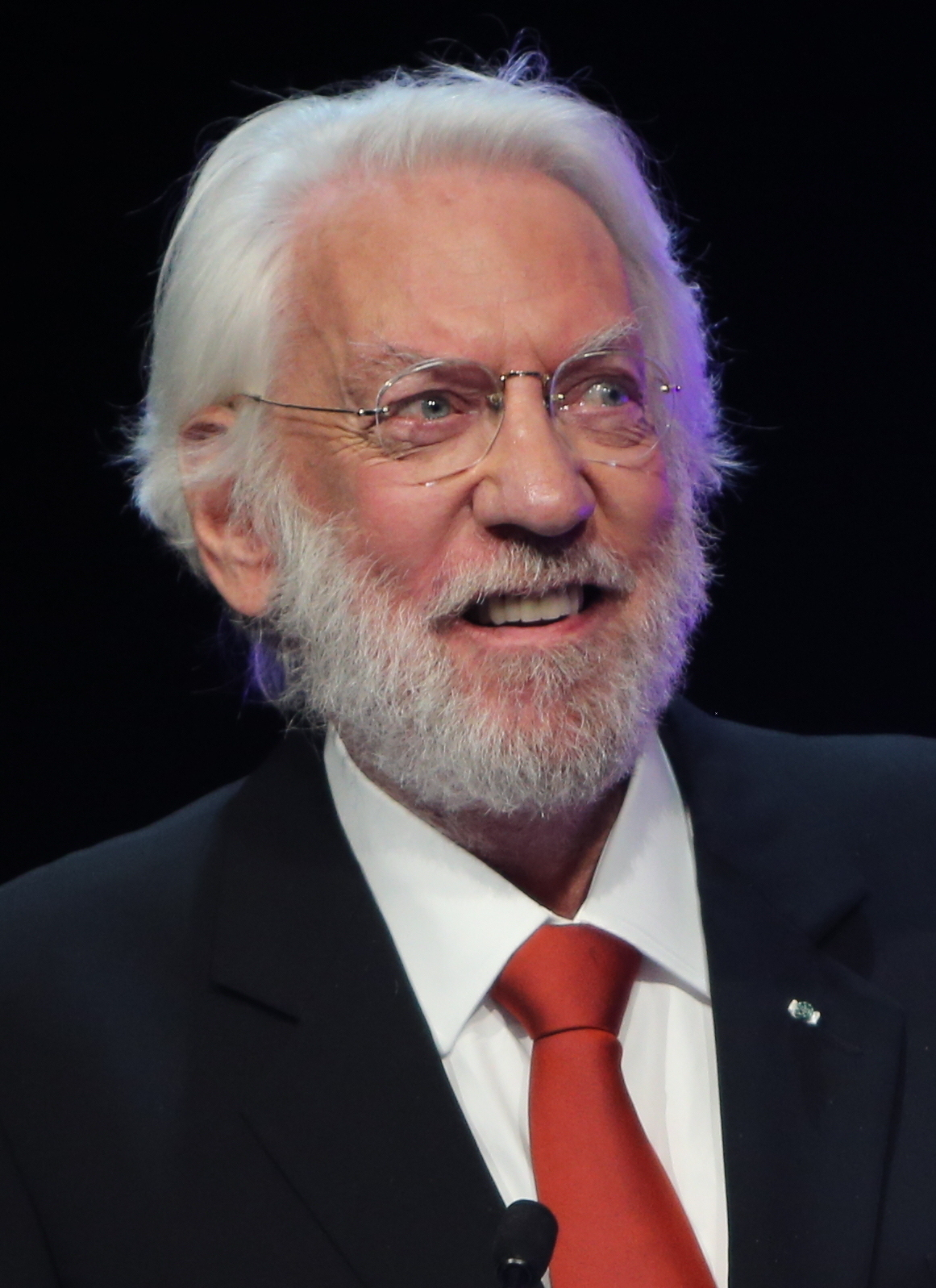
- Sutherland in 2013
- Born: Donald McNichol Sutherland; 17 July 1935; Saint John, New Brunswick, Canada
- Died: 20 June 2024 (aged 88); Miami, Florida, U.S.
- Education: University of Toronto (BA); London Academy of Music and Dramatic Art
- Occupation: Actor
- Years active: 1960–2023
- Notable work: Filmography
- Spouses: Lois May Hardwick (m. 1959; div. 1966) Shirley Douglas (m. 1966; div. 1970) Francine Racette (m. 1990)
- Children: 5, including Kiefer, Rossif, and Angus
- Relatives: Sarah Sutherland (granddaughter)
- Awards: Full list

Donald McNichol Sutherland (17 July 1935 – 20 June 2024) was a Canadian actor. With a career spanning six decades, he received numerous accolades, including a Primetime Emmy Award and two Golden Globe Awards as well as a BAFTA Award nomination. Considered one of the best actors never nominated for an Academy Award, he received an Academy Honorary Award in 2017.

Sutherland rose to fame after roles in the war films The Dirty Dozen (1967); M*A*S*H (1970); and Kelly's Heroes (1970). He further established himself with leading roles in Klute (1971), Don't Look Now (1973), The Day of the Locust (1975), 1900 (1976), Fellini's Casanova (1976), Invasion of the Body Snatchers (1978), Ordinary People (1980), Eye of the Needle (1981), A Dry White Season (1989), Six Degrees of Separation (1993), Without Limits (1998), Space Cowboys (2000) and supporting roles in Animal House (1978), JFK (1991), Cold Mountain (2003), The Italian Job (2003), Pride & Prejudice (2005), and Ad Astra (2019). He portrayed President Snow in The Hunger Games franchise (2012–2015).

On television, he portrayed Mikhail Fetisov in the HBO thriller Citizen X (1995), which earned him the Primetime Emmy Award for Outstanding Supporting Actor in a Limited Series or Movie. He played Clark Clifford in the HBO biographical war film Path to War (2002) for which he received the Golden Globe Award for Best Supporting Actor – Series, Miniseries or Television Film. He also acted in the NBC war drama Uprising (2001), the miniseries Human Trafficking (2005), the FX drama series Trust (2018), and the HBO mystery limited series The Undoing (2020).

Sutherland was made an Officer of the Order of Canada (OC) in 1978, raised to Companion (CC) in 2019, inducted into the Canadian Walk of Fame in 2000 and the Hollywood Walk of Fame in 2011. He is the father of Kiefer, Rossif, and Angus Sutherland, all actors. Sutherland was a prominent voice in politics throughout his life and was particularly vocal as an anti-war activist during the Vietnam War.

== Early life and education ==
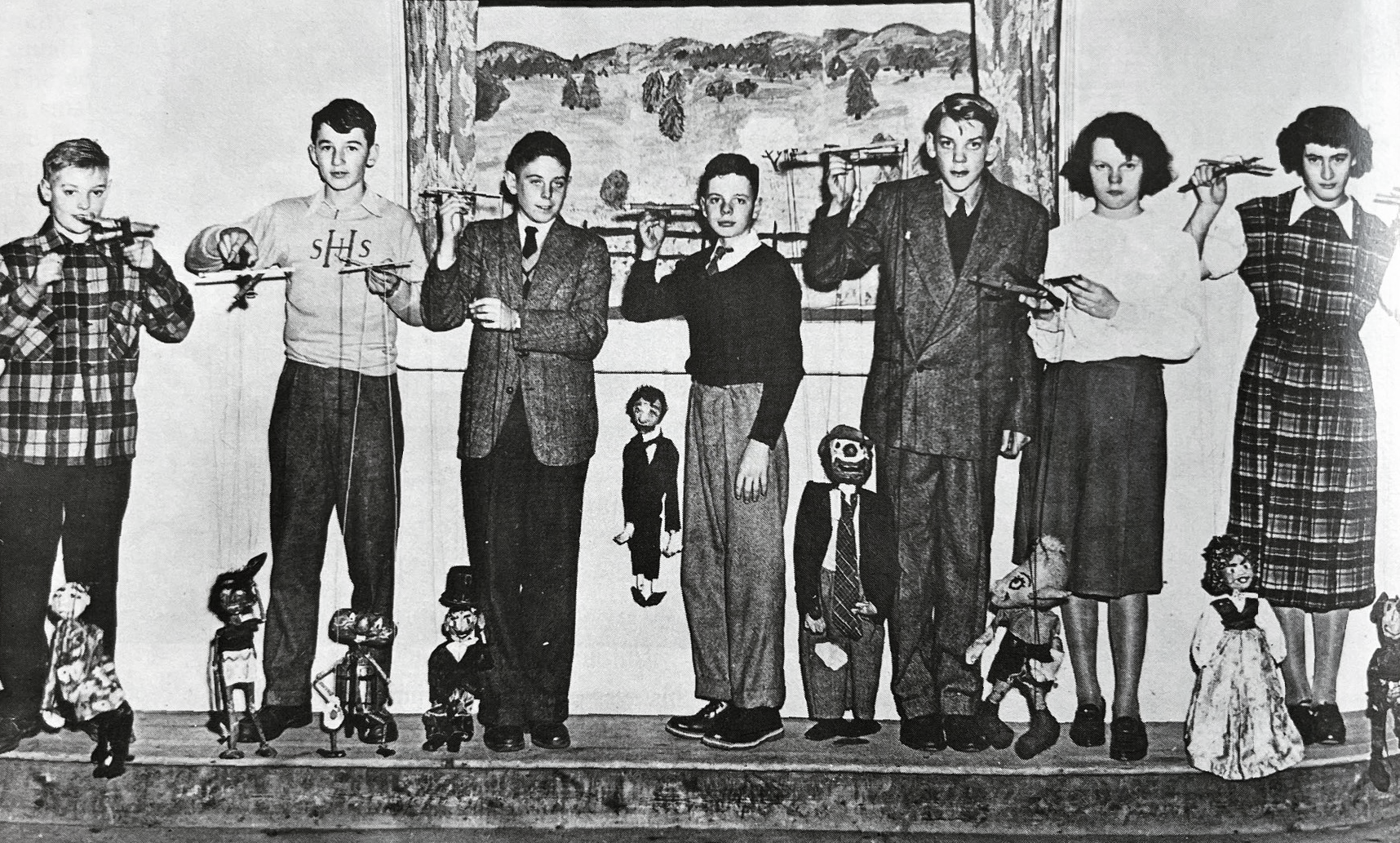
Sutherland (third from the right) at the Puppet Club at Victoria School in Saint John, 1948

Donald McNichol Sutherland was born on 17 July 1935 at the Saint John General Hospital in Saint John, New Brunswick, Canada, the youngest son of Dorothy Isobel (née McNichol; 1892–1956) and Frederick McLea Sutherland (1894–1983), who worked in sales and ran the local gas, electricity, and bus company. Both Dorothy and Frederick were originally from Lockeport, Nova Scotia. He was of Scottish, German, and English ancestry. His grandfather was a Scots church minister. As a child, he had rheumatic fever, hepatitis, and polio. During the first six years of his life, Sutherland and his family lived on present-day Kennebecasis River Road in Hampton, a town in Kings County, having moved there from Saint John while he was an infant. He first received education at a one-room schoolhouse in Hampton; Sutherland's family moved back to Saint John when he was six, his father having secured a position in the New Brunswick Power Company as its vice president and general manager. Sutherland attended the Victoria School in Saint John, and later played hockey for the school. During this time, Sutherland also practiced puppetry.

In a letter Sutherland sent to a Saint John Free Public Library representative in 2017, he detailed how he and his family had lived in a farmhouse in Lakeside, located in present-day Hampton, before moving to Bridgewater, Nova Scotia, at the age of 12, where he spent his teenage years. He obtained his first part-time job, at the age of 14, as a news correspondent for local radio station CKBW. At the age of 19, Sutherland spent four months as an exchange student in Finland, where he lived near an iron mine in Otanmäki, Kainuu.

Sutherland graduated from Bridgewater High School. He then began studying at the University of Toronto, initially in engineering before switching to English at Victoria College, where he met his first wife Lois May Hardwick. He graduated in 1958, with a dual degree in engineering and drama. He had at one point been a member of the "UC Follies" comedy troupe in Toronto. He changed his mind about becoming an engineer, and left Canada for Britain in 1957, studying at the London Academy of Music and Dramatic Art (LAMDA).

== Career ==
=== 1960–1968: Early work and breakthrough ===
While at LAMDA, Sutherland began appearing in West End productions. He dropped out his first year and moved to Scotland, where he acted at the Perth Repertory Theatre for 18 months from 1960. He appeared as Heracles in Benn Levy's The Rape of the Belt and toured throughout Scotland, including Arbroath, Dunfermline and Kirkcaldy. His roommate was actor Michael Sheard. In the early-to-mid-1960s, Sutherland began to gain small roles in British films and TV, such as a hotel receptionist in The Sentimental Agent episode, "A Very Desirable Plot" (1963). He was featured alongside Christopher Lee in several horror films, such as Castle of the Living Dead (1964) and the anthology film Dr. Terror's House of Horrors (1965). He also had a supporting role in the Hammer Films production of Die! Die! My Darling! (1965), with Tallulah Bankhead and Stefanie Powers. In the same year, he appeared in the Cold War classic, The Bedford Incident, and in the TV series Gideon's Way, in the 1966 episode "The Millionaire's Daughter". In 1966, Sutherland appeared in the BBC TV play Lee Oswald – Assassin, playing a friend of Lee Harvey Oswald's named Charles Givens (even though Givens himself was an African American). He also appeared in the TV series The Saint.

In 1967, he appeared in "The Superlative Seven", an episode of The Avengers. In 1966, he also made a second, and more substantial appearance in The Saint (S5, E14). The episode, "Escape Route", which was directed by the show's star, Roger Moore, who later recalled Sutherland "asked me if he could show it to some producers as he was up for an important role... they came to view a rough cut and he got The Dirty Dozen". The film, which starred Lee Marvin, Charles Bronson, John Cassavetes, Robert Ryan and several other popular actors, was the fifth highest-grossing film of 1967 and MGM's highest-grossing film of the year. In 1968, after the breakthrough in the UK-filmed The Dirty Dozen, Sutherland left London for Hollywood.

=== 1970–1979: Stardom and praise ===
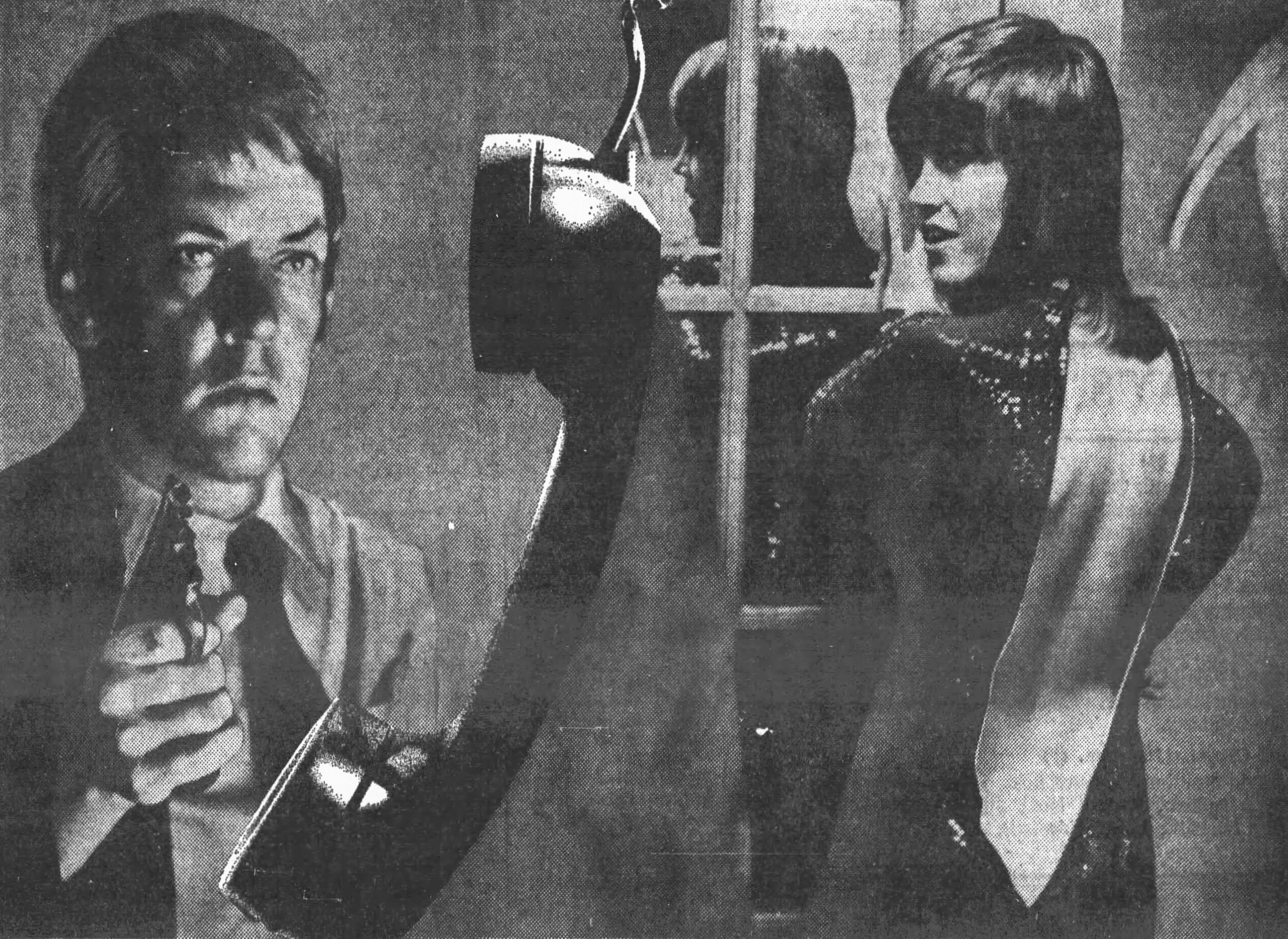
Sutherland and Jane Fonda starring in the film Klute (1971)

Sutherland then appeared in two war films, playing the lead role as Hawkeye Pierce in the Robert Altman–directed comedy M*A*S*H in 1970; and, again in 1970, as hippie tank commander "Oddball" in Kelly's Heroes alongside Clint Eastwood, Telly Savalas and Don Rickles. His health was threatened by spinal meningitis contracted during the filming of the latter film. Sutherland starred with Gene Wilder in the 1970 comedy Start the Revolution Without Me. During the filming of the Academy Award-winning detective thriller Klute (1971), Sutherland had an intimate relationship with co-star Jane Fonda. Also in 1971, Sutherland starred as Christ in the independent anti-war film, Johnny Got His Gun, based on the Dalton Trumbo novel of the same name. Sutherland and Fonda went on to co-produce and star together in the anti–Vietnam War documentary F.T.A. (1972), consisting of a series of sketches performed outside army bases in the Pacific Rim and interviews with U.S. troops who were then on active service. As a follow-up to their appearance in Klute, Sutherland and Fonda performed together in Steelyard Blues (1973), a "freewheeling, Age-of-Aquarius, romp-and-roll caper" from the writer David S. Ward.

Sutherland found himself as a leading man throughout the 1970s in films such as the Venice-based psychological horror film Don't Look Now (1973), co-starring Julie Christie, a role which saw him nominated for the BAFTA Award for Best Actor. He took a leading role in the war film The Eagle Has Landed (1976) acting opposite Michael Caine and Robert Duvall That same year he starred in Federico Fellini's film Federico Fellini's Casanova (1976) playing Giacomo Casanova. A year later, he had parts as a clumsy waiter in the comedy The Kentucky Fried Movie and as a contract killer in the thriller The Disappearance.

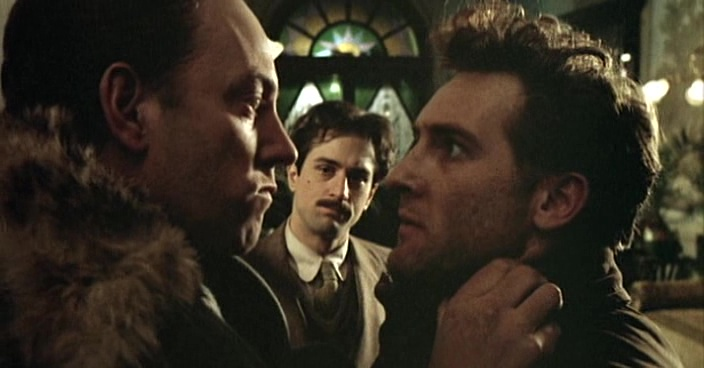
Sutherland, Robert De Niro, and Gérard Depardieu in Bertolucci's 1976 epic film 1900

Sutherland took the role of a health inspector in the science fiction/horror film Invasion of the Body Snatchers (1978) alongside Brooke Adams, Leonard Nimoy, and Jeff Goldblum. Janet Maslin of The New York Times wrote of his performance, "Mr. Sutherland is by turns personable and opaque, affecting in a way that he hasn't been since Klute". He helped launch the internationally popular Canadian television series Witness to Yesterday, with a performance as the Montreal doctor Norman Bethune, a physician and humanitarian, largely talking of Bethune's experiences in revolutionary China. Sutherland also had a role as pot-smoking Professor Dave Jennings in National Lampoon's Animal House in 1978, making himself known to younger fans as a result of the film's popularity. When cast, he was offered either $40,000 upfront or two per cent of the film's gross earnings. Thinking the film would certainly not be a big success, he chose the upfront payment. The film eventually grossed $141.6 million. Also, in 1978 Sutherland starred in the heist comedy film The First Great Train Robbery, alongside Sean Connery. Sutherland's performance as Attila, an Italian fascist in Bernardo Bertolucci's 1976 epic film 1900, received praise from critics such as A. O. Scott of The New York Times for his portrayal of a sadistic, "over-the-top villainy" villain.

=== 1980–2009: Established actor ===
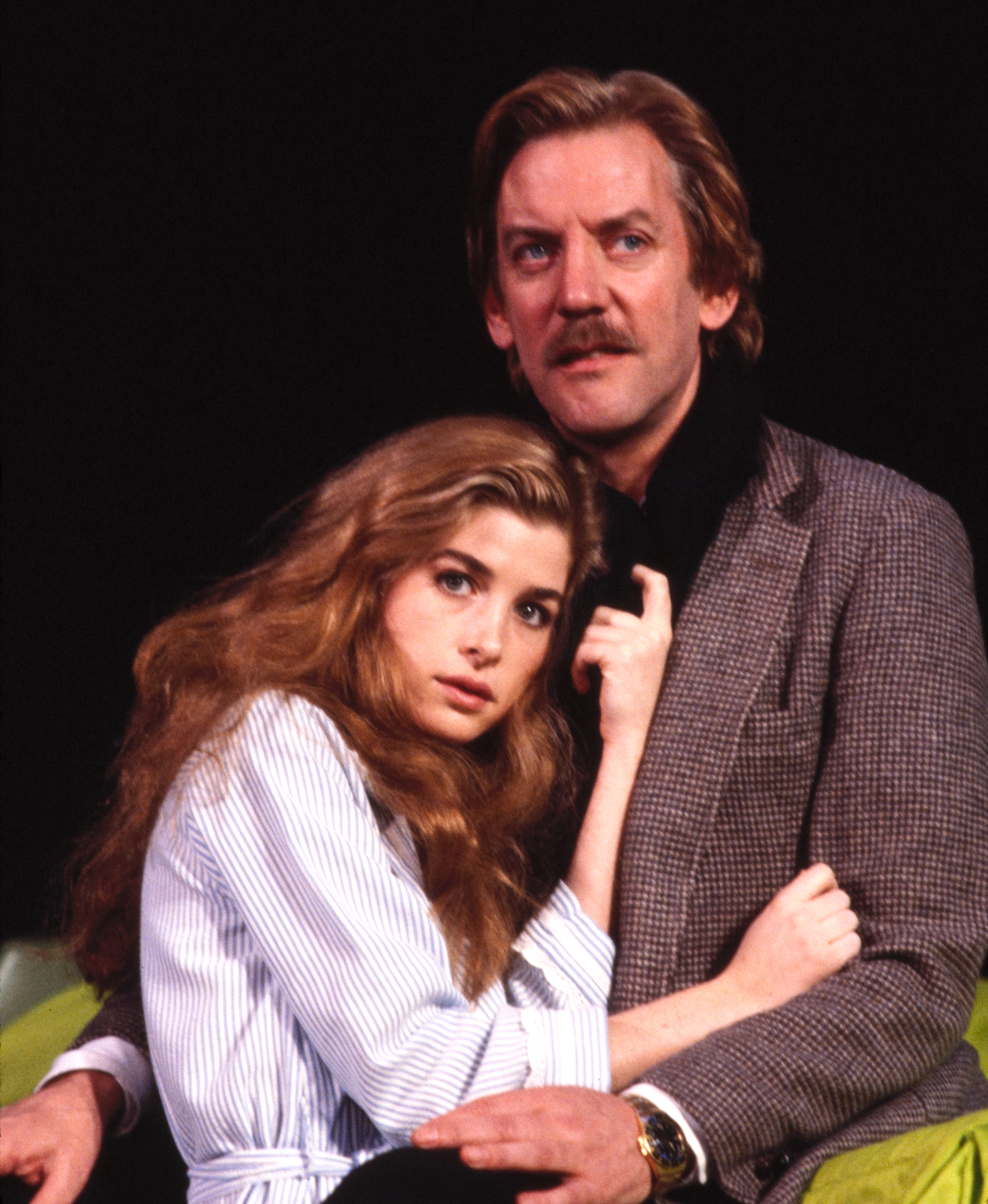
Blanche Baker and Sutherland during Lolita rehearsal, 1980

Sutherland received praise for his role as the conflicted and grieving father in the Robert Redford-directed family drama Ordinary People (1980), alongside Mary Tyler Moore and Timothy Hutton. In September 1980, Vincent Canby of The New York Times wrote, "Mr. Sutherland realizes his best film role in years, playing a fellow who, filled with love for both his wife and his son, is angrily accused by each of fence-sitting, of being weak and indecisive when he's really the only one in the family with some idea of what is wrong." Sutherland was nominated for the Golden Globe Award for Best Actor in a Motion Picture – Drama. In 1981, he starred in the English spy thriller Eye of the Needle and narrated Anne Wheeler's Canadian docudrama A War Story. He played the role of physician-hero Norman Bethune in Bethune (1977) and Bethune: The Making of a Hero (1990). In 1983, he co-starred with Teri Garr and Tuesday Weld in an adaptation of John Steinbeck's The Winter of Our Discontent. Some of Sutherland's better known roles in the 1980s and 1990s were in the apartheid drama A Dry White Season (1989), alongside Marlon Brando and Susan Sarandon; as a sadistic warden in Lock Up (1989) with Sylvester Stallone; as an incarcerated pyromaniac in the firefighter thriller Backdraft (1991) alongside Kurt Russell and Robert De Niro, as the humanitarian doctor-activist Norman Bethune in 1990's Bethune: The Making of a Hero, and as a snobbish New York City art dealer in Six Degrees of Separation (1993), with Stockard Channing and Will Smith.

In the 1991 Oliver Stone film JFK, he played a mysterious Washington intelligence officer, reputed to have been L. Fletcher Prouty, who spoke of links to the military–industrial complex in the assassination of John F. Kennedy. He played psychiatrist and visionary Wilhelm Reich in the video for Kate Bush's 1985 single, "Cloudbusting". In 1992, he played the role of Merrick in the film Buffy the Vampire Slayer, with Kristy Swanson. In 1994, he played the head of a government agency hunting for aliens who take over people's bodies (a premise similar to Invasion of the Body Snatchers) in the film of Robert A. Heinlein's 1951 book The Puppet Masters. In 1994, Sutherland played a software company's scheming CEO in Barry Levinson's drama Disclosure opposite Michael Douglas and Demi Moore, in 1994 he played a KGB officer in the video game Conspiracy, and in 1995 was cast as Maj. Gen. Donald McClintock in Wolfgang Petersen's Outbreak. In 1995, he was also in the HBO film Citizen X, which won him the Primetime Emmy Award for Outstanding Supporting Actor in a Limited Series or Movie and the Golden Globe Award for Best Supporting Actor – Series, Miniseries or Television Film. He was later cast in 1996 (for only the second time) with his son Kiefer in Joel Schumacher's A Time to Kill. In 1998 he took the role of Bill Bowerman in the sports drama Without Limits for which he was nominated for the Golden Globe Award for Best Supporting Actor – Motion Picture. Critic Roger Ebert wrote, "Sutherland's performance is the film's treasure... brings a deep patience to Bowerman, who understands that running is a matter of endurance and strategy, as well as heart". Sutherland played the famous American Civil War General P.G.T. Beauregard in the 1999 film The Hunley.

He played an astronaut in Space Cowboys (2000), with co-stars Clint Eastwood, Tommy Lee Jones, and James Garner. Sutherland was a model for Chris Claremont and John Byrne to create Donald Pierce, the Marvel Comics character whose last name comes from Sutherland's character in the 1970 film M*A*S*H, Hawkeye Pierce. He starred as Adam Czerniaków in the NBC miniseries Uprising (2001). He starred as Clark Clifford in the HBO film Path to War (2002), which again earned him the Golden Globe Award for Best Supporting Actor – Series, Miniseries or Television Film. In more recent years, Sutherland was known for his role as Reverend Monroe in the Civil War drama Cold Mountain (2003), Lou Aldryn in the drama thriller Baltic Storm (2003), John Bridger in the remake of The Italian Job (2003), Nathan Templeton in the TV series Commander in Chief (2005–2006), Ogden C. Osbourne in the film Fierce People (2005) with Diane Lane and Anton Yelchin.

Sutherland played the family patriarch, Mr. Bennet, in Pride & Prejudice (2005) directed by Joe Wright starring alongside Keira Knightley. Roisin O'Connor of The Independent wrote that he gives "arguably the most moving scene of the movie, [where] he gives his consent to Elizabeth to marry Mr. Darcy." That same year he starred in the miniseries Human Trafficking (2005) acting opposite Mira Sorvino. For his performance he was nominated for the Primetime Emmy Award for Outstanding Lead Actor in a Limited Series or Movie. He also played a minor role in Mike Binder's Reign Over Me (2007). Sutherland starred as Tripp Darling in the prime time drama series Dirty Sexy Money for ABC. He played multi-millionaire Nigel Honeycut in the 2008 film Fool's Gold. His distinctive voice was also used in many radio and television commercials, including those for Delta Air Lines, Volvo automobiles, and Simply Orange orange juice.

=== 2010–2023: The Hunger Games and final roles ===
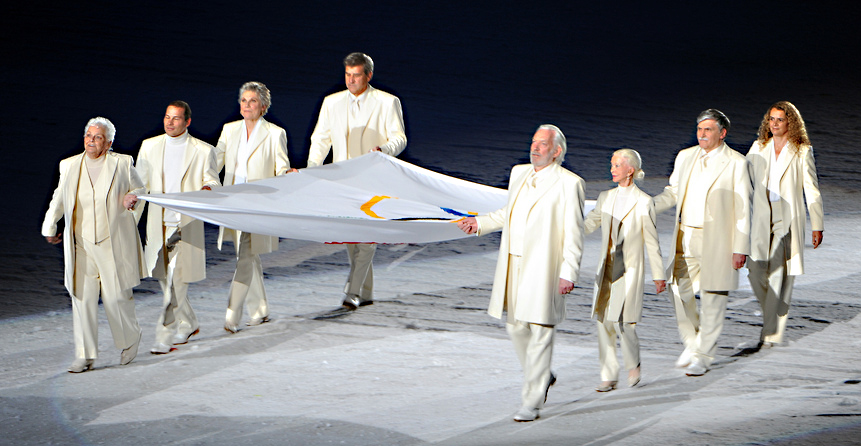
Several notable Canadians, including Sutherland (right front), carrying the Olympic flag at the 2010 Winter Olympics opening ceremony in Vancouver

Sutherland provided voice-overs and narration during the intro of the first semifinal of Eurovision Song Contest 2009, and the Opening Ceremony of the 2010 Winter Olympics in Vancouver, and was also one of the Olympic flag bearers. He was also the narrator of CTV's "I Believe" television ads in the lead-up to the Games. In 2010, he starred alongside an ensemble cast in a TV adaptation of Ken Follett's novel The Pillars of the Earth (2010) acting alongside Ian McShane, Matthew Macfadyen, Rufus Sewell, Hayley Atwell, and Eddie Redmayne. The following year he acted in several films including the crime thriller The Mechanic, the historical epic The Eagle, and the comedy Horrible Bosses. He also played a priest in the 2011 miniseries adaptation of the Herman Melville novel Moby-Dick.

Beginning in 2012, Sutherland portrayed President Coriolanus Snow, the main antagonist of The Hunger Games film franchise, in The Hunger Games (2012), The Hunger Games: Catching Fire (2013), The Hunger Games: Mockingjay – Part 1 (2014), and Part 2 (2015). His role was well-received by fans and critics. In 2012 he played Captain Flint in the British series Treasure Island, an adaptation of the Robert Louis Stevenson 1883 novel of the same name acting opposite Eddie Izzard and Elijah Wood.

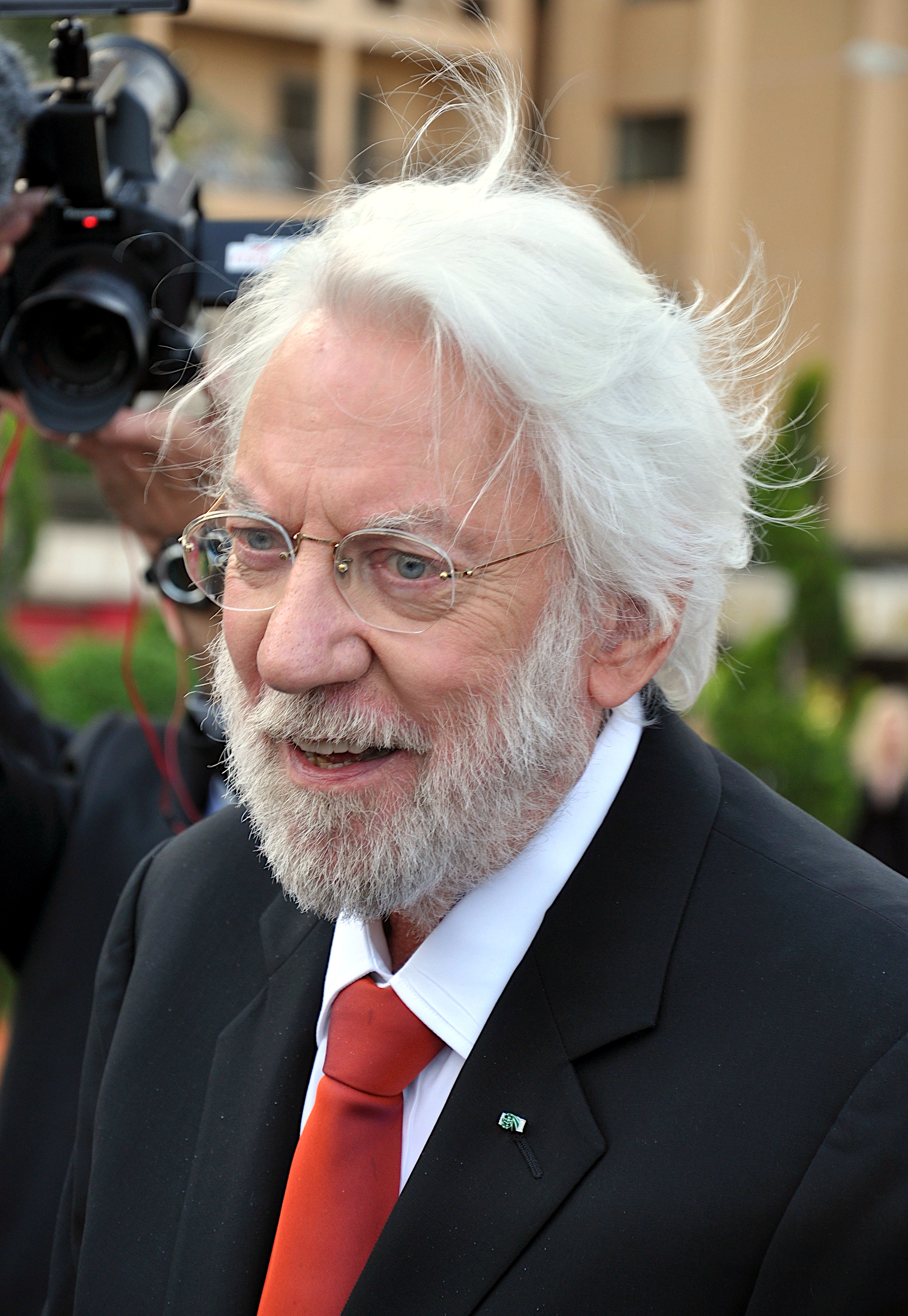
Sutherland at the 2013 Monte-Carlo Television Festival

On 26 March 2012, he was a guest on the Opie and Anthony radio show where he mentioned he had been offered the lead roles in Deliverance and Straw Dogs, although turned down both offers because he did not want to appear in violent films at the time. The role in Deliverance went to Jon Voight and the role in Straw Dogs to Dustin Hoffman, and both films enjoyed critical and box office success. After declining these violent roles, he quipped: "And then I played a fascist" in 1900 by Bernardo Bertolucci. Sutherland appeared in the European police procedural Crossing Lines, which premiered on 23 June 2013, on the US NBC network. Sutherland, who played the Chief Prosecutor for the International Criminal Court named Michel Dorn, was one of only two actors to appear in all episodes across three seasons from 2013 to 2015. In 2016, he was a member of the main competition jury of the 2016 Cannes Film Festival.

On 6 September 2017, it was announced that Sutherland, along with three other recipients, would receive an Honorary Oscar from the Academy of Motion Picture Arts and Sciences "for a lifetime of indelible characters, rendered with unwavering truthfulness". At the ceremony, he was honored by Jennifer Lawrence, Colin Farrell, and Whoopi Goldberg. This was Sutherland's only Academy Award in his then six decade long film career. Sutherland starred opposite Helen Mirren playing an elderly married couple in the comedy-drama The Leisure Seeker (2017) based on the 2009 novel of the same name by Michael Zadoorian. The film premiered at the Venice International Film Festival. Deborah Young of The Hollywood Reporter wrote, "Sutherland's dignified but memory-robbed English prof often rings true through a veil of gentle humor". That year he also took a supporting role in the romantic comedy Basmati Blues starring Brie Larson.

In 2018, Sutherland portrayed oil tycoon J. Paul Getty in the FX historical drama series Trust. Kristen Baldwin of Entertainment Weekly wrote, "Sutherland does a typically excellent job conveying J. Paul Getty's stern disappointment in his feckless progeny". The following year he acted in the James Gray directed science fiction drama Ad Astra and the crime thriller The Burnt Orange Heresy. In 2020, he appeared in the HBO limited series The Undoing (2020) alongside Hugh Grant and Nicole Kidman. For his performance he received the Critics' Choice Television Award for Best Supporting Actor in a Movie/Miniseries. Sutherland took the role of Mr. Harrigan in the 2022 Netflix film Mr. Harrigan's Phone written and directed by John Lee Hancock, based on the novella of the same name from the book If It Bleeds by Stephen King. In 2023, he took the role of Isaac C. Parker in the series Lawmen: Bass Reeves on Paramount+.

== Personal life ==
Sutherland was made an Officer of the Order of Canada on 22 December 1978, and was promoted to Companion of the Order of Canada in 2019. He was inducted into Canada's Walk of Fame in March 2000. He had maintained a residence in Georgeville, a village in Quebec, since 1977. Referred to as his "emotional home," Sutherland occupied this house during the summer. He had additional houses in other places, including Paris, France. Sutherland also owned a condominium in Miami, Florida.

=== Marriages and family ===
Me and my dad really got to know each other after I left home at 15. My parents split when I was three and my mum, sister and I moved to Canada, so I didn't live with my dad. I would see him at Christmas and for a couple of weeks in the summer. I certainly did see him, but it was really relegated to around holidays.

— Kiefer Sutherland

Sutherland married three times. His first marriage, to Lois May Hardwick, a head school teacher, lasted from 1959 to 1966. His second marriage, which lasted from 1966 to 1970, was to Shirley Douglas, daughter of Tommy Douglas, the social democratic former premier of Saskatchewan. Sutherland and Douglas had two children, twins Kiefer and Rachel. From 1970 to 1972, he had an affair with Klute co-star Jane Fonda, with whom he had participated in anti-Vietnam war activism.

Sutherland married his long-term partner Francine Racette in the 1990s. The couple had been together since meeting on the set of the Canadian pioneer drama Alien Thunder in the early 1970s. They had three sons – Rossif, Angus, and Roeg – all of whom were named after directors Sutherland had worked with. Kiefer (his son with Douglas) is named after American-born director and writer Warren Kiefer, who, under the assumed name of Lorenzo Sabatini, directed Sutherland in his first feature film, the Italian low-budget horror film Il castello dei morti vivi (Castle of the Living Dead); Roeg is named after director Nicolas Roeg; Rossif is named after French director Frédéric Rossif; and Angus's middle name, Redford, is after Robert Redford.

=== Politics ===
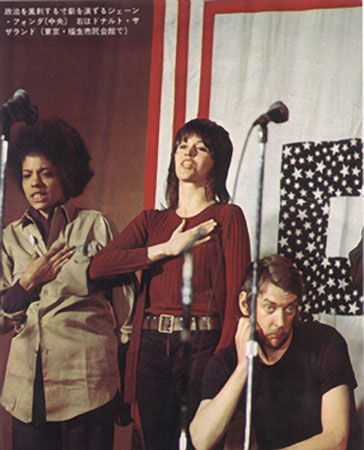
Sutherland (seated) performing in the anti-Vietnam War FTA (Free The Army) road show, 1971

Sutherland was an antiwar activist who started the Free Theatre Associates (aka Free The Army) tour with Jane Fonda, Peter Boyle, Howard Hesseman, Elliott Gould, Mike Nichols, Ben Vereen, Dick Gregory, Nina Simone, and other celebrities as an alternative to Bob Hope's USO in Vietnam. Documents declassified in 2017 show that Sutherland was on the National Security Agency watchlist between 1971 and 1973 at the request of the Central Intelligence Agency because of his anti-war activities. Sutherland was a vocal opponent of the Vietnam War. He also opposed the U.S.-led invasion of Iraq.

Sutherland became a blogger for the American news website The Huffington Post during the 2008 United States presidential election campaign. In his blogs, he stated his support for Barack Obama.

Although he was proud to be Canadian, was an officer in the Order of Canada, and had no intention of changing his citizenship, Sutherland complained in 2015 that he was not allowed to vote because he was an expatriate for over five years. The Supreme Court of Canada allowed expats to vote in national elections in a decision handed down in 2019.

== Death and tributes ==
Sutherland died from chronic obstructive pulmonary disease (COPD) while under hospice care at the University of Miami hospital on 20 June 2024 at age 88.

His son Kiefer announced his death on X/Twitter adding, "He loved what he did and did what he loved, and one can never ask for more than that. A life well lived". Upon hearing of his death, Canadian Prime Minister Justin Trudeau wrote, "We've lost one of the greats. Donald Sutherland brought a level of brilliance to his craft few could match. A remarkable, legendary actor—and a great Canadian". U.S. President Joe Biden wrote, "Donald Sutherland was a beloved husband, father, grandfather, and one-of-a-kind actor who inspired and entertained the world for decades".

Numerous members of the film industry wrote condolences, including Jane Fonda, Alec Baldwin, William Baldwin, Josh Brolin, Kim Cattrall, John Cusack, Michael Douglas, Roland Emmerich, Elliott Gould, Ron Howard, John Leguizamo, Janet Maslin, Helen Mirren, David Oyelowo, Lou Diamond Phillips, Richard Roeper, Edgar Wright, Will Smith, Henry Winkler, and his Hunger Games co-stars—Tom Blyth, Rachel Zegler and Jennifer Lawrence.

Following his death, a funeral was held in Miami and his remains were cremated.

== Artistry and legacy ==
Throughout his life, multiple sources have considered Sutherland one of the greatest actors never to have been nominated for an Academy Award. He was given the Academy Honorary Award during the 90th Academy Awards in 2017.

In 2014, he established the Donald Sutherland Award for Best Performance through a donation to Hart House Theatre at the University of Toronto, where he had previously studied. The award is given each year to a University of Toronto student in recognition of outstanding acting at the Hart House U of T Drama Festival.

In 2023 Sutherland told The Canadian Press that he had not spent much time reflecting on the legacy of his career, stating "You know, it's over or very nearly over, so I guess I got to get down to thinking about it." Viking Canada is set to publish his memoir, Made Up, But Still True, which was originally scheduled to be published on November 12, 2024. However, it has been pushed back to February 3, 2026 on the date of its intended release. In October 2025, Penguin Random House (which was set to publish the memoir in the US through its Crown Publishing Group imprint) sued the actor's estate over the memoir, citing that Sutherland's family has deliberately blocked its manuscript and preventing the book from reaching publication, seeking a return of $400,000. Following his death, the City of Saint John, his birthplace and childhood residence, opened a condolence book signing to the public.

The long list of Sutherland's roles and accomplishments shows a man who understood emotion well. But it's this marriage of suspicion and empathy, human feeling and the fear of humanity gone wrong, that secured his place in acting history and made him an uncommon kind of star. He didn't disappear into a role, not exactly; he was too distinctive for that. More often, the role disappeared into him, and the result was something unforgettable".

— Alissa Wilkinson, The New York Times

Helen Mirren named Sutherland as "one of the smartest actors I ever worked with. He had a wonderful enquiring brain and a great knowledge of a wide variety of subjects. He combined this great intelligence with a deep sensitivity, and with seriousness about his profession as an actor. This all made him into the legend of film that he became." David Oyelowo, who worked with Sutherland on what became his final performance in Lawmen: Bass Reeves, stated that "Given the iconic status he rightly achieved, having a front row seat to Donald Sutherland's last onscreen performance was both a privilege and clear evidence to me of his deep passion for the craft of acting. The glint in his eye was that of an inquisitive, hungry artist still on the hunt for the truth. Seeing that glint, up close, in the eyes of a legend was something to behold." Jane Fonda, who worked with Sutherland on the 1971 film Klute, wrote: "Donald was a brilliant actor and a complex man who shared quite a few adventures with me, such as the FTA Show, an anti-Vietnam war tour that performed for 60,000 active duty soldiers, sailors, and marines in Hawaii, Okinawa, the Philippines, and Japan in 1971. I am heartbroken."

Sutherland's BBC obituary says that the "late Donald Sutherland cast a literal and figurative shadow over his industry for almost 50 years". The Guardian's Peter Bradshaw wrote that "Sutherland was an utterly unique actor and irreplaceable star" and "was an aristocrat of screen actors". Variety's Owen Gleiberman wrote that "in 1970, Donald Sutherland ... was the coolest movie star on the planet. The moment I saw him in "MASH," I knew he was the person I wanted to be, the same way that I wanted to be Mick Jagger or Steve McQueen". Canadian Prime Minister Justin Trudeau stated, "He was a man with a strong presence, a brilliance in his craft, and truly a great Canadian artist and he will be deeply missed."

== Acting credits and accolades ==
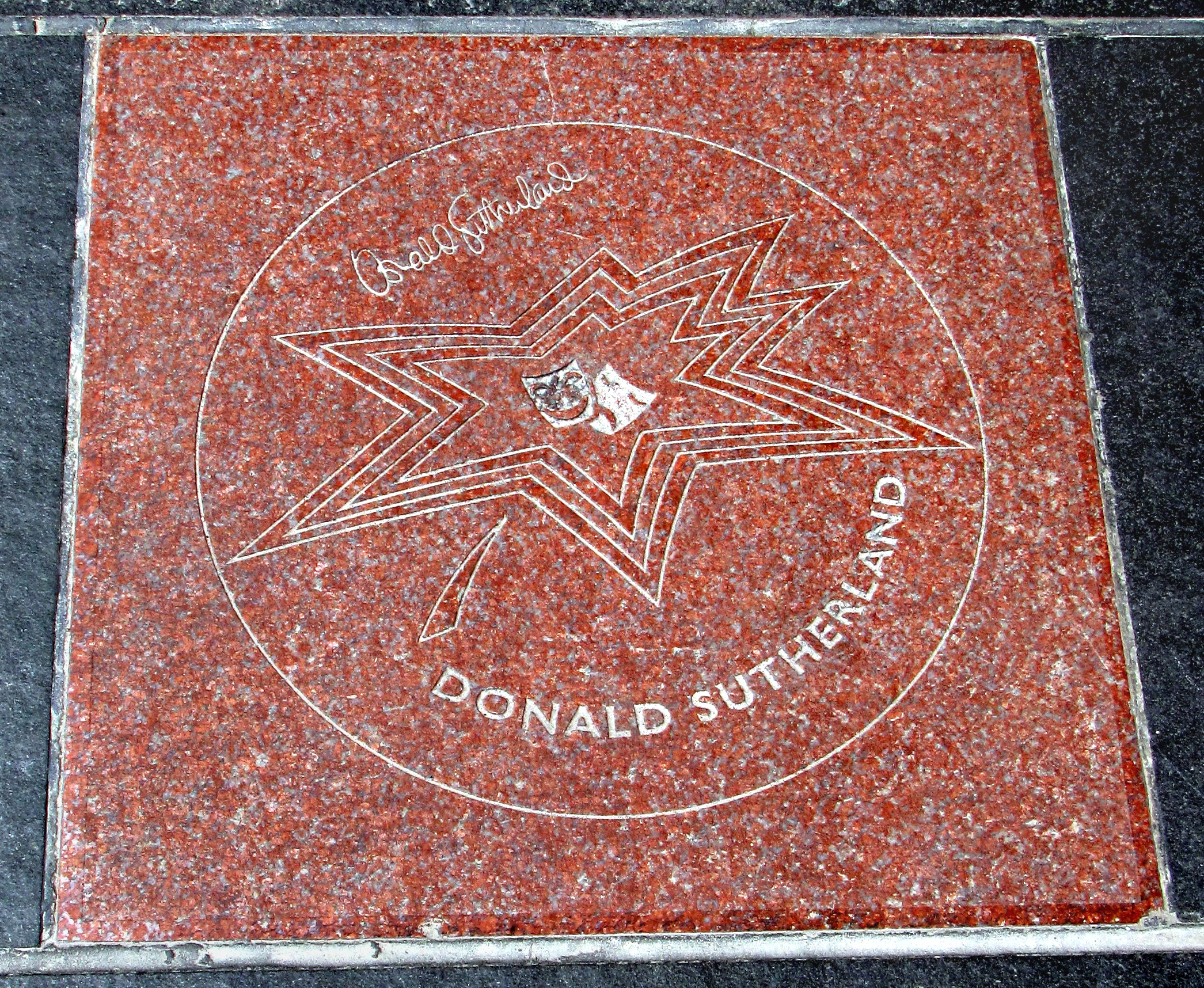
Sutherland's star on Canada's Walk of Fame

Over his career he received numerous accolades including a Primetime Emmy Award, a Golden Globe Award, and an Academy Honorary Award. He received the Commandeur of the Ordre des Arts et des Lettres in 2012, and the Companion of the Order of Canada (CC) in 2019. In 2023, Canada Post issued a stamp in his honour, commemorating his career as one of Canada's most respected and versatile actors.

- 1978: Officer of the Order of Canada (OC)
- 2000: Canada's Walk of Fame
- 2000: Governor General's Performing Arts Award for Lifetime Artistic Achievement
- 2005: Honorary Doctor of Arts (Hon DArt) from Middlebury College (Middlebury, Vermont, US)
- 2011: Star on the Hollywood Walk of Fame (7024 Hollywood Boulevard, next to his son Kiefer).
- 2012: Commandeur of the Ordre des Arts et des Lettres
- 2017: Academy Honorary Award.
- 2019: Companion of the Order of Canada (CC)
- 2023 (19 October): Canada Post commemorative postage stamp
