= Michael Zadoorian =

American novelist

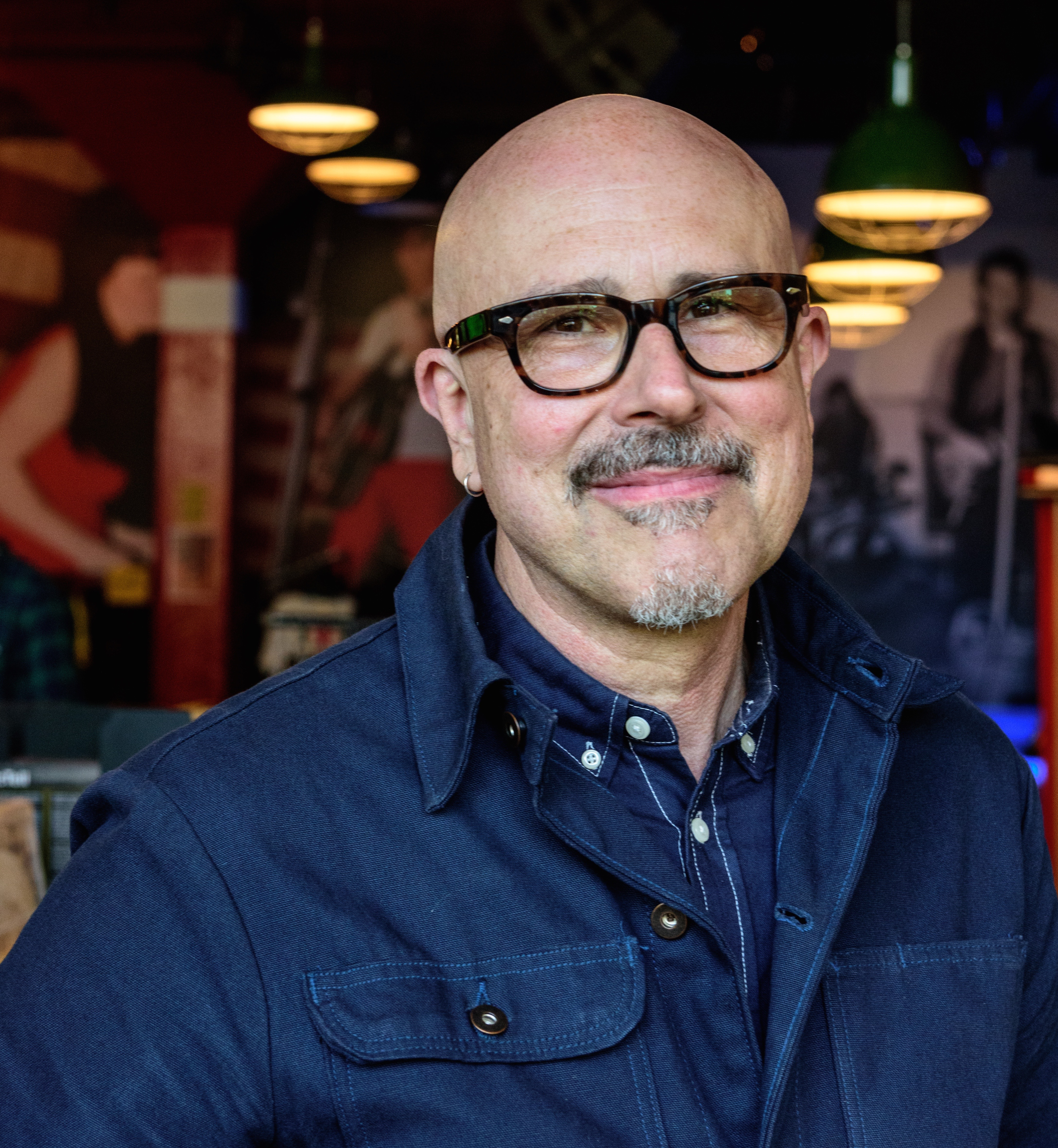
- Born: Detroit, Michigan, U.S.
- Education: Wayne State University

Michael Zadoorian is an American novelist and short story writer of Armenian descent. Zadoorian's work explores love, death, music, memory, things forgotten and found again, the eidetic power of photographic images, and Detroit. He is best known as the author of The Leisure Seeker, published in 2009 by William Morrow and Company. In 2018, it was adapted for a motion picture starring Helen Mirren and Donald Sutherland, and directed by Italian film director Paolo Virzi. The film was released in March 2018.

== Career ==
Zadoorian was born in Detroit, Michigan, the son of Rosemary Zadoorian (Spala) and Norman Zadoorian, an industrial photographer. He graduated from Wayne State University with a B.A. in Communications and minor in English. He later returned to Wayne State, where he studied with writers Charles Baxter, Samuel Astrachan and Christopher Towne Leland, winning three Tompkins Awards for fiction and essay and a Loughead-Eldridge Creative Writing Scholarship. He earned an M.A. in creative writing in 1994.

His short stories have appeared in The Literary Review, Beloit Fiction Journal, American Short Fiction, Great Lakes Review, Wisconsin Review, Witness, North American Review and the anthologies Detroit Noir, On the Clock and Bob Seger’s House.

In 2000, W. W. Norton published his first novel, Second Hand, about a Detroit-area vintage store owner searching for meaning in other people's junk. The New York Times Book Review called it "a gift from the (Tiki) gods" and "a romantic adventure that explores what Yeats called 'the foul rag and bone shop of the heart.''' The book was awarded the Great Lakes Colleges Association First Fiction Award and was selected for the Barnes & Noble Discover Great New Writers and Book Sense 76 programs.

In 2009, William Morrow published his second novel, The Leisure Seeker, a road novel about John and Ella, an elderly couple who escape the doctors and adult children who control their lives, to take a final vacation together. Booklist, in a starred review stated: "The Leisure Seeker is pretty much like life itself: joyous, painful, funny, moving, tragic, mysterious, and not to be missed." The Los Angeles Times review called the novel a "heartfelt story of the grown children dealing with "stuff," both physical and emotional, left over after the death of their parents". It was a bestseller in Italy and long-listed for the International Dublin Literary Award.

Also in 2009, Wayne State University Press published The Lost Tiki Palaces of Detroit, a collection of stories, which received a Michigan Notable Book Award.

In 2010, he received the Anahid Literary Award from Columbia University. In 2013, he was the recipient of a Kresge Artist Fellowship in the Literary Arts.

In 2016, at the Cannes Film Festival, award-winning Italian director Paolo Virzi announced that The Leisure Seeker would be his first English language film, with Helen Mirren and Donald Sutherland starring as Ella and John. The script was adapted by Francesca Archibugi, Francesco Piccolo, Stephen Amidon and Virzi. Filming commenced in July 2016 in Georgia and wrapped September 2016 in Key West, Florida. Sony Pictures Classics acquired all rights for the U.S., Latin America, Asia (excluding Japan), Eastern Europe, Portugal and South Africa, and the film was released in March 2018 in the United States.

In 2018, Beautiful Music, was released by Akashic Books. Set in 1970's era Detroit, Beautiful Music is the story of one young man's transformation through music. Danny Yzemski is a husky, pop radio–loving loner balancing a dysfunctional home life with the sudden harsh realities of freshman year at a high school marked by racial turbulence. After tragedy strikes his family, Danny finds his own reason to carry on: rock ‘n’ roll. In particular, the heavy music of local legends like the MC5 and Iggy Pop. O, The Oprah Magazine named it one of the Top Books of Summer: "Danny Yzemski tunes out a dysfunctional family with Frank Zappa and Iggy Pop, shaking his countercultural fist at The Man in this eight-track flashback of a novel set in 1970s Detroit." While The Wall Street Journal called it an "endearing coming-of-age tale measured in album tracks." Beautiful Music also received a Michigan Notable Book award.

2020 brought his fourth novel, The Narcissism of Small Differences also from Akashic Books. A comic novel about Joe Keen and Ana Urbanek, an aging creative-class couple long unmarried and without children, on the cusp of forty, caught between mainstream and alternative culture, sincerity and irony, achievement and arrested development. Set in 2009 Detroit, the book explores the financial, moral and everyday compromises we make simply to survive in the world, the consequences of those compromises and the people we become because of them. The book received highly positive reviews from Booklist and Kirkus Reviews. Library Journal called it: “[A] warm, surprisingly playful novel about middle-age crisis." Publishers Weekly stated that “Zadoorian’s comedy of contemporary manners resonates by virtue of its introspective characters and depictions of the small moments in life that, taken together, have great significance."

He was named 2022 Michigan Author Award winner, a lifetime achievement award conferred by the Library of Michigan.

In early 2026, he announced that his fifth novel would be published by Beatdom Books in March 2027. A biographical novel called Beat Girl: A Novel of Edie Kerouac. A fictional look at the life-long romance between novelist Jack Kerouac and his first wife from Detroit, Edie Parker.

== Personal life ==
A lifelong resident of the Detroit area, Zadoorian has worked as a shipping room clerk, a plant guard for Chrysler, a UPS mail sorter, a freelance journalist, but primarily as an advertising copywriter, spending most of his career at the Doner and Campbell Ewald agencies in the Detroit area. He lives with his wife, Rita Simmons, in Ferndale, Michigan.

== Works ==
=== Novels ===
- Second Hand (2000)
- The Leisure Seeker (2009)
- Beautiful Music (2018)
- The Narcissism of Small Differences (2020)
- Beat Girl: A Novel of Edie Kerouac (2027)

=== Short stories ===
- The Lost Tiki Palaces of Detroit: Short Stories (2009)

== Awards ==
- Winner, Michigan Author Award from the Library of Michigan (2022)
- Michigan Notable Book Award, Beautiful Music (2018)
- Winner,"Great Lakes Great Reads" award in Adult Fiction for Beautiful Music (2018) by the Great Lakes Independent Booksellers Association
- Kresge Fellowship in the Literary Arts (2013)
- Longlisted, International Dublin Literary Award (2011)
- Michigan Notable Book Award, The Lost Tiki Palaces of Detroit (2010)
- Winner, Columbia University (NY), Anahid Literary Award (2010)
- Prix Chronos de Literature selection, France (2009)
- Speaker, International Short Story Festival, Wroclaw, Poland (2009)
- Honoree, Festivaletteratura, Mantua, Italy (2009)
- Great Lakes Colleges Association (GLCA) First Fiction Award (2001)
- Best Books of 2000, Detroit Free Press (2000)
- Favorite Books of 2000, Chicago Tribune (2000)
- Selection, Barnes & Noble “Discover Great New Writers'' program (2000)
- Best Books of 2000, Fiction and Literature, Borders.com (2000)
- Pre-Press Short Fiction award, Michigan Council for Arts (1995)
