= The Leisure Seeker (novel) =

2009 novel by Michael Zadoorian

- Author: Michael Zadoorian
- Language: English
- Genre: Comedy, Romance
- Publisher: William Morrow and Company
- Publication date: 27 January 2009
- Publication place: United States
- Media type: Print (hardback & paperback), Audiobook
- ISBN: 978-0-061-71983-7

The Leisure Seeker is a romantic comedy novel written by American author Michael Zadoorian, published in 2009. The second novel of the author. The novel was adapted into a film of the same name, starring Donald Sutherland and Helen Mirren, and was premiered at the 74th Venice International Film Festival in 2017.

== Characters ==
- Ella – The book is written from her perspective, in first person.
- John – Ella's husband.

== Reception ==
Booklist, in a starred review stated: ''The Leisure Seeker is pretty much like life itself: joyous, painful, funny, moving, tragic, mysterious, and not to be missed.'' The Los Angeles Times review called the novel a "heartfelt story of the grown children dealing with 'stuff,' both physical and emotional, left over after the death of their parents". It was a bestseller in Italy and long-listed for the IMPAC Dublin Literary Award.

== Film adaptation ==
In 2016, at the Cannes Film Festival, award-winning Italian director Paolo Virzi announced that The Leisure Seeker would be his first English language film, with Helen Mirren and Donald Sutherland starring as Ella and John. The script was adapted by Francesca Archibugi, Francesco Piccolo, Stephen Amidon and Virzi. Filming commenced in July, 2016 in Georgia and wrapped September 2016 in Key West, Florida. Sony Pictures Classics acquired all rights for the U.S.
