= List of awards and nominations received by Donald Sutherland =

Donald Sutherland awards and nominations
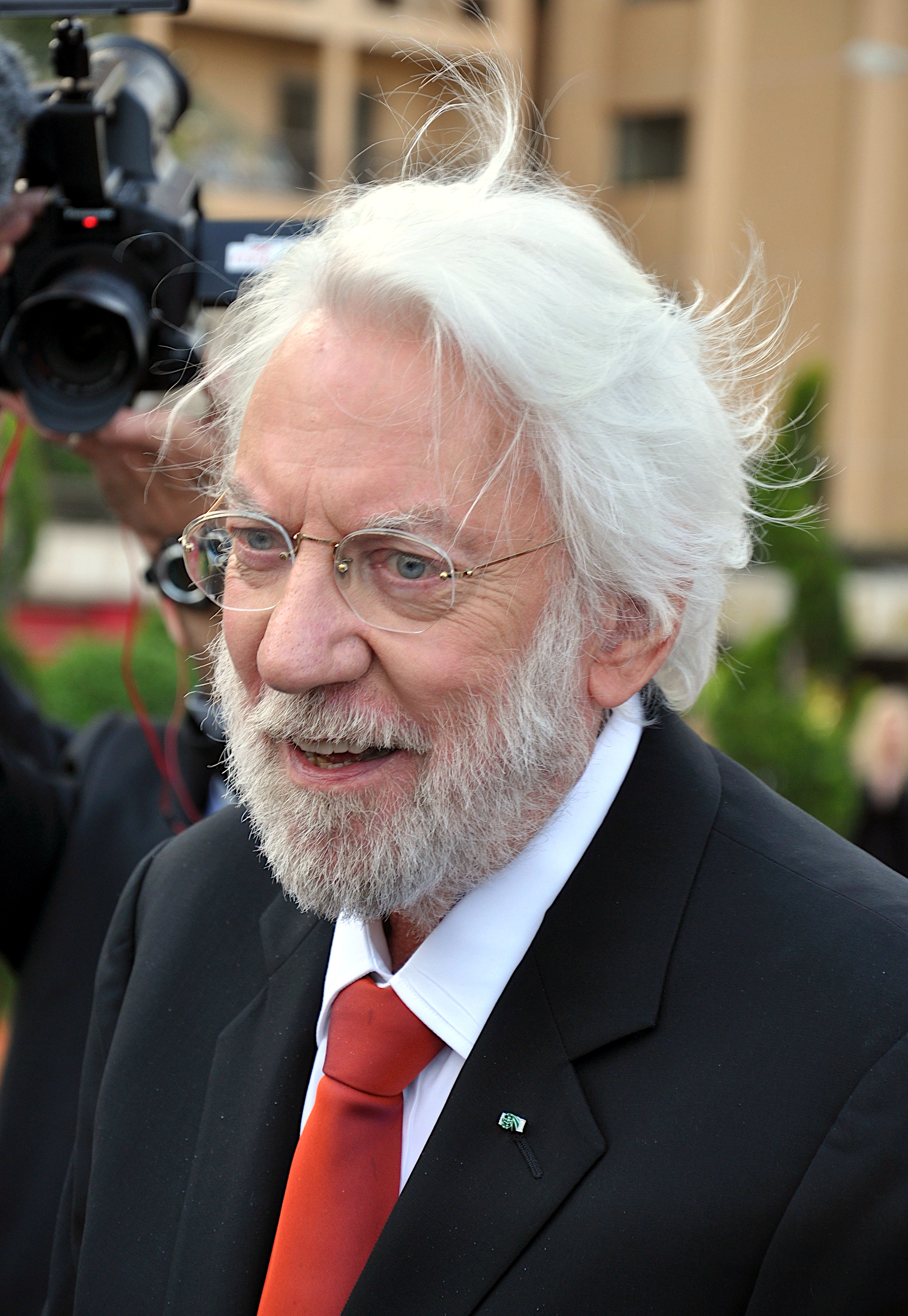
- Sutherland at the Monte-Carlo Television Festival in 2013
Awards and nominations
Award	Wins	Nominations
Academy Awards	1	1
BAFTA Awards	0	1
Golden Globe Awards	2	9
Primetime Emmy Awards	1	2

This article is a List of awards and nominations received by Donald Sutherland.

Donald Sutherland was a Canadian actor known for his numerous roles on stage and screen. For his lifetime achievement in film he was awarded the Academy Honorary Award at the 2017 Governors Awards by the Academy of Motion Picture Arts and Sciences. He received competitive wins for a Primetime Emmy Award and two Golden Globe Awards as well as a nomination for a British Academy Film Award.

Sutherland won the Primetime Emmy Award for Outstanding Supporting Actor in a Limited or Anthology Series or Movie for his role in the HBO television film Citizen X (1995). He was Emmy-nominated for his portrayal of an Immigration agent in the miniseries Human Trafficking (2005). He received two Golden Globe Awards for Best Supporting Actor – Series, Miniseries or Television Film for Citizen X and for his portrayal of Clark Clifford in the HBO film Path to War (2002). He received numerous Golden Globe-nominations including for playing Capt. Hawkeye Pierce in M*A*S*H (1970), a grieving father in Ordinary People (1980), and Bill Bowerman in Without Limits (1998). For his role in the HBO miniseries The Undoing (2020) he received the Critics' Choice Television Award for Best Supporting Actor in a Movie/Miniseries.

== Major associations ==
=== Academy Awards ===
Year	Category	Nominated work	Result	Ref.
2017	Academy Honorary Award	—N/a	Honored	

=== BAFTA Awards ===
British Academy Film Awards
Year	Category	Nominated work	Result	Ref.
1973	Best Actor in a Leading Role	Don't Look Now / Steelyard Blues	Nominated	

=== Emmy Awards ===
Primetime Emmy Awards
Year	Category	Nominated work	Result	Ref.
1995	Outstanding Supporting Actor in a Miniseries or a Special	Citizen X	Won	
2006	Outstanding Lead Actor in a Miniseries or a Movie	Human Trafficking	Nominated	

=== Golden Globe Awards ===
Year	Category	Nominated work	Result	Ref.
1970	Best Actor in a Motion Picture – Musical or Comedy	M*A*S*H	Nominated	
1980	Best Actor in a Motion Picture – Drama	Ordinary People	Nominated	
1995	Best Supporting Actor – Television	Citizen X	Won	
1998	Best Supporting Actor – Motion Picture	Without Limits	Nominated	
2002	Best Supporting Actor – Television	Path to War	Won	
2005	Best Actor in a Miniseries or Television Film	Human Trafficking	Nominated	
2005	Best Supporting Actor – Television	Commander in Chief	Nominated	
2007	Best Supporting Actor – Television	Dirty Sexy Money	Nominated	
2020	Best Supporting Actor – Television	The Undoing	Nominated	

== Miscellaneous awards ==
=== AARP Movies for Grownups Awards ===
Year	Category	Nominated work	Result	Ref.
2006	Best Actor	Aurora Borealis	Won	
2006	Best Grownup Love Story	Aurora Borealis	Nominated	

=== Blockbuster Entertainment Awards ===
Year	Category	Nominated work	Result	Ref.
2000	Favorite Action Team	Space Cowboys	Nominated	

=== CableACE Awards ===
Year	Category	Nominated work	Result	Ref.
1992	Supporting Actor in a Movie or Miniseries	Quicksand: No Escape	Nominated	

=== CAMIE Awards ===
Year	Category	Nominated work	Result	Ref.
2005	Theatrical Releases	Pride and Prejudice	Won	

=== Chicago Film Critics Association ===
Year	Category	Nominated work	Result	Ref.
2005	Best Supporting Actor	Pride and Prejudice	Nominated	

=== Critics' Choice Television Awards ===
Year	Category	Nominated work	Result	Ref.
2020	Best Supporting Actor in a Limited Series or Movie	The Undoing	Won	

=== Genie Awards ===
Year	Category	Nominated work	Result	Ref.
1982	Best Actor in a Leading Role	Threshold	Won	

=== Gold Derby Awards ===
Year	Category	Nominated work	Result	Ref.
2003	Ensemble Cast	Cold Mountain	Nominated	
2006	TV Movie/Mini Lead Actor	Human Trafficking	Nominated	

=== Golden Raspberry Awards ===
Year	Category	Nominated work	Result	Ref.
1989	Worst Supporting Actor	Lock Up	Nominated	

=== Jutra Awards ===
Year	Category	Nominated work	Result	Ref.
2000	Best Supporting Actor	The Art of War	Nominated	

=== Karlovy Vary International Film Festival ===
Year	Category	Nominated work	Result	Ref.
1982	Best Actor	Threshold	Won	

=== Laurel Awards ===
Year	Category	Nominated work	Result	Ref.
1971	Top Male Comedy Performance	M*A*S*H	Nominated	

=== MTV Movie & TV Awards ===
Year	Category	Nominated work	Result	Ref.
2014	Best Villain	The Hunger Games: Catching Fire	Nominated	

=== NAACP Image Awards ===
Year	Category	Nominated work	Result	Ref.
1971	Outstanding Actor in a Motion Picture	Klute	Won	

=== National Society of Film Critics ===
Year	Category	Nominated work	Result	Ref.
1998	Best Supporting Actor	Without Limits	2nd Place	

=== Nickelodeon Kids' Choice Awards ===
Year	Category	Nominated work	Result	Ref.
2015	Favorite Villain	The Hunger Games: Mockingjay – Part 1	Nominated	

=== Online Film & Television Association Awards ===
Year	Category	Nominated work	Result	Ref.
2002	Best Supporting Actor in a Motion Picture or Miniseries	Path to War	Nominated	
2005	Best Supporting Actor in a Drama Series	Commander in Chief	Nominated	
2021	Best Supporting Actor in a Motion Picture or Limited Series	The Undoing	Nominated	

=== RiverRun International Film Festival ===
Year	Category	Nominated work	Result	Ref.
2006	Best Actor	Aurora Borealis	Won	

=== San Sebastián International Film Festival ===
Year	Category	Nominated work	Result	Ref.
2019	Donostia Award		Won	

=== Satellite Awards ===
Year	Category	Nominated work	Result	Ref.
1998	Best Actor in a Supporting Role in a Motion Picture – Drama	Without Limits	Won	
2006	Best Actor in a Supporting Role – Motion Picture	Aurora Borealis	Nominated	
2020	Best Actor in a Supporting Role in a Series, Miniseries or a Motion Picture Made for Television	The Undoing	Nominated	

=== Saturn Awards ===
Year	Category	Nominated work	Result	Ref.
1978	Best Actor	Invasion of the Body Snatchers	Nominated	

=== Teen Choice Awards ===
Year	Category	Nominated work	Result	Ref.
2014	Choice Movie: Villain	The Hunger Games: Catching Fire	Won	
2015	Choice Movie: Villain	The Hunger Games: Mockingjay – Part 1	Nominated	

=== Venice Film Festival ===
Year	Category	Nominated work	Result	Ref.
2019	Fondazione Mimmo Rotella Award	The Burnt Orange Heresy	Won	

=== Young Hollywood Awards ===
Year	Category	Nominated work	Result	Ref.
2008	Role Model Award		Won	

=== Zurich Film Festival ===
Year	Category	Nominated work	Result	Ref.
2018	Career & Lifetime Achievement Award / Golden Eye Award		Won	
