= Defeat of the Mafia =

- Directed by: Warren Kiefer
- Written by: Warren Kiefer (as Marian Doebbeling); Alfredo Tassoni
- Starring: Victor Spinetti; Maria Pia Conte
- Cinematography: Amerigo Gengarelli
- Music by: Stefano Torossi
- Release date: 1970
- Language: Italian

Defeat of the Mafia (Italian: Scacco alla mafia) is an Italian noir-crime film directed by Warren Kiefer and starring Victor Spinetti and Maria Pia Conte. It was shot in the late 1968 but released only in November 1970. It was initially planned to be an Italian-Argentine co-production.

== Cast ==
- Victor Spinetti as Charles Agostino
- Maria Pia Conte as Jenny Ryan
- Pier Paolo Capponi as Scott Luce
- Alan Collins as Frankie Agostino
- Néstor Garay as Jon Dahlia
- Micaela Pignatelli as Marjorie Mills
- Carmen Scarpitta as Countess Torreguardia
- Paolo Giusti as Niki Velour
- Margarita Puratich as Susan Palmer
- Luigi Bonos as Giulio
- Enzo Fiermonte as Count Torreguardia
- Mariella Palmich as Nun
- Franco Borelli as Leone
- Angela Goodwin as Vice Consul
- Aldo Berti as Cacci
