= The Disappearance (film) =

1977 film

- Directed by: Stuart Cooper
- Screenplay by: Paul Mayersberg
- Based on: Echoes of Celandine by Derek Marlowe
- Produced by: David Hemmings
- Starring: Donald Sutherland; Francine Racette; David Hemmings; John Hurt; David Warner; Virginia McKenna; Christopher Plummer
- Cinematography: John Alcott
- Edited by: Eric Boyd-Perkins
- Music by: Robert Farnon
- Release dates: December 1977 (U.K.); 10 May 1981 (Canada)
- Running time: 100 min; Canada: 88 min
- Countries: Canada; UK
- Language: English
- Budget: $1,900,000 CDN

The Disappearance is a 1977 British-Canadian thriller film directed by Stuart Cooper, and starring Donald Sutherland, Francine Racette, David Hemmings and John Hurt. It is based on the novel Echoes of Celandine by Derek Marlowe.

== Plot ==
Jay Mallory is a contract killer living in Montréal who works for an unknown international criminal organization. He returns home to his downtown apartment one cold winter day to find that his wife, Celandine, is gone. Mallory initially thinks that Celandine has left him of her own volition, since their marriage was a sometimes stormy, albeit passionate, relationship. However, Mallory's main point of contact at the Organization, Burbank, indicates that Celandine's disappearance may be somehow associated with Mallory's last hit. Shortly after their discussion, Burbank himself disappears.

The Organization assigns Mallory another job in Suffolk, England. Mallory feels that there is something unusual about this job as he is given little initial information, including not knowing who the target is and that it is associated with Celandine's disappearance. Despite feeling that he may be being set up, Mallory decides to take the job anyway to see how it plays out and if it leads him back to Celandine. Meanwhile, he has been told that his missing wife had an affair with an Englishman named Roland Deverell.

Mallory flies to London as instructed. He meets his new contact, Atkinson, who gives him a weapon to be used for the assassination, which they refer to as a "shy". After renting a car and driving to rural Suffolk, Mallory begins to suspect that the Organization plans to betray him since Burbank informed him earlier that the Organization often "retires" operatives who are deemed no longer trustworthy or useful.

Mallory visits the wife of Roland Deverell, Catherine, who says her husband is a serial womaniser, but that his affair with Celandine seemed exclusive. While at Catherine's house, Mallory receives a phone call from Atkinson, who passes on details of the assassination including the target's name, Roland Deverell.

After breaking into the large country house of his target, Mallory is surprised and held at gunpoint by Deverell, who says he is the Organization's head whom Mallory has never met. Deverell tells Mallory he has been expecting him to show up. He says that Celandine has been having an affair with himself for a long time, that she left England the day before Mallory arrived, and that she orchestrated the hit. When Deverell attempts to kill Mallory, Mallory succeeds in killing him instead. He returns to London and flies back to Canada.

After arriving at his apartment in Montréal, Mallory finds that Celandine has returned. She tells him that she was involved with Deverell out of frustration due to their failing marriage and that she later, through the Organization's various channels and middle men, arranged for Mallory to assassinate Deverell so she could be free of him and Mallory could leave the Organization. Mallory seems to accept this, and he and Celandine make love.

The next morning, Mallory appears confident and happy. He decides to cook Celandine breakfast and leaves the apartment alone to go food shopping. A little later, as Mallory arrives outside his apartment with groceries, an unseen sniper shoots and kills him, startling Celandine inside.

== Cast ==
- Donald Sutherland as Jay Mallory
- Francine Racette as Celandine
- David Hemmings as Edward
- John Hurt as Atkinson
- David Warner as Burbank
- Peter Bowles as Jefferies
- Virginia McKenna as Catherine
- Christopher Plummer as Deverell
- Michèle Magny as Melanie
- Duane Howard as James
- Robin Sachs as young man

Additionally, Michael Eric Kramer made his acting debut in this film as Peter.

== Production ==
Jake Eberts helped raise money for the film when some funds ran out at the last minute.

Shot in 1977 in Montreal, this was film producer Garth Drabinsky's first production. According to film critic Jay Scott, Eric Boyd-Perkins originally edited the film; but the version released in Canadian cinemas in 1983 had been re-cut by "film doctor" Fima Noveck, who had "saved any number of other ailing" movies.

The film went over budget during filming and the completion guarantor had to step in.

== Reception ==
Jay Scott dismissed the film as "irredeemably nasty, supremely glossy trash."

The film was a box office failure. However, Derek Winnert calls it a "sleekly made and intriguing upmarket mystery".

== Notes ==
- Eberts, Jake; Illott, Terry (1990). My indecision is final. Faber and Faber.
