= Warren Kiefer =

American novelist

- Born: 1929; New Jersey, U.S.
- Died: 1995 (aged 65–66); Buenos Aires, Argentina
- Other names: Lorenzo Sabatini, Middleton Kiefer
- Education: University of New Mexico; University of Maryland

Warren Kiefer (1929–1995) was an American film director and screenwriter from New Jersey. He used the alias Lorenzo Sabatini, while working in Italy. He named himself after the 16th-century painter Lorenzo Sabbatini, whom he admired.

== Early life ==
In 1929, Kiefer was born in New Jersey. He received his college education at both the University of New Mexico and the University of Maryland. He got married and in the late 1950s, Kiefer had a son named Alden Kiefer and a daughter Kathleen.

He worked in various public relations and editorial roles, and in 1958 started a career as a novelist. His first novel was Pax (1958), a fast-paced suspense novel that drew on his PR experience in the drug industry. It was co-written with Harry J. Middleton, and published under the pseudonym "Middleton Kiefer".

== Film career ==
Beginning in the late 1950s, Kiefer started working on US Government films, such as script writer for a film history of the Canadian Army produced by the United States Army Pictorial Center and another called Operation Danville.

For unclear reasons, Kiefer soon left his family and previous work behind and moved to Italy where he found work in the film industry. He worked in Cinecittà, where he befriended expatriate film producer Paul Maslansky. The two decided to co-operate in creating their own feature film. Kiefer had already shot a documentary for Esso in Libya.

Kiefer was the main director of the gothic film Castle of the Living Dead (1964). The film was an official "Italo-French co-production". To receive state subsidies, the film required an Italian director. So Kiefer could not be directly credited for the film. Italian prints and posters instead credited "Herbert Wise" as the director of the film. "Wise" was an alias used by Luciano Ricci, the film's first assistant director. Ricci had registered the pseudonym for his work in the film Alone Against Rome (1962).

Kiefer was the director of three more Italian films: Next of Kin (1968), Juliet De Sade (1969), and Defeat of the Mafia (1970). Unlike Castle, these are "largely forgotten" films. They are rarely seen in the 21st century. His screenwriting credits include The Last Rebel (1971 film), starring Joe Namath, and the Western film Beyond the Law.

At a later point in his life (in 1989), Kiefer claimed to have actually directed at least six films after Castle. He also claimed to have scripted twenty more films. All his work reportedly was produced in Italy, and Italian directors received the official credit for the films. Kiefer reportedly only received the payment for his uncredited work. It is unclear whether he exaggerated when reporting his life story, or whether his account of his own career was accurate.

== Novelist ==
Kiefer wrote eight thriller novels. His best known novel was The Lingala Code (1972), which won the 1973 Edgar Award. The novel was set in the Democratic Republic of the Congo, during the period following the assassination of Patrice Lumumba (1961). In the early 1960s, Kiefer had visited the Congo and shot films there, as well as other places in Africa and the Middle East. By his own account, his experiences there served as a background for the novel.

His third novel was The Pontius Pilate Papers (1976), a fast-paced adventure novel. It had theological undertones. His fourth novel, set in Argentina, was named The Kidnappers (1977). Outlaw was published in 1991.

== Death ==
In the early 1970s, Kiefer moved to Argentina. He lived the rest of his life in Buenos Aires until dying of a heart attack in 1995.
