= Behind the Mask (organisation) =

Online LGBT archive in Africa

- Founded: 2000
- Founder: Bart Luirink
- Founded at: South Africa
- Type: Non-governmental Organization
- Official language: English

Behind the Mask was an online archive for LGBT African activists and LGBT rights in Africa. Its offices were in Johannesburg, South Africa. Its web address was www.mask.org.za.

== Overview ==
It mainly focused on South Africa, but it also supported LGBT activists in East and Central Africa (Kenya, Uganda, Tanzania, Rwanda, Burundi, Zambia), southern Africa (Namibia, Botswana), and West Africa (Ghana and Sierra Leone). It was started by the Dutch journalist Bart Luirink. Its aim was to support LGBT African movements with information. Behind the Mask "bolstered LGBT organizing throughout Africa because its website shared information about gains and setbacks that activists in different places experienced." Behind the Mask's websites aided the visibility of LGBT Africans and served as "beacons of hope for sexually and gender-variant Africans." Behind the Mask shut down in 2012 and the contents of its website were almost entirely lost. Parts of the website at are still viewable through the Internet Archive Wayback Machine.
