= The Leisure Seeker =

2017 Italian-French film by Paolo Virzi

- Theatrical release poster
- Directed by: Paolo Virzì
- Written by: Paolo Virzì; Francesca Archibugi Francesco Piccolo; Stephen Amidon
- Based on: The Leisure Seeker by Michael Zadoorian
- Produced by: Fabrizio Donvito; Marco Cohen; Benedetto Habib
- Starring: Helen Mirren; Donald Sutherland; Christian McKay; Janel Moloney; Dana Ivey; Dick Gregory
- Cinematography: Luca Bigazzi
- Edited by: Jacopo Quadri
- Music by: Carlo Virzì
- Production companies: Indiana Production Company; Rai Cinema
- Distributed by: 01 Distribution (Italy); BAC Films (France)
- Release dates: 3 September 2017 (Venice); 3 January 2018 (France); 18 January 2018 (Italy)
- Running time: 112 minutes
- Countries: Italy; France
- Language: English
- Budget: €15 million
- Box office: $19.3 million

The Leisure Seeker is a 2017 comedy-drama film directed by Paolo Virzì, in his first full English-language feature. The film is based on the 2009 novel of the same name by Michael Zadoorian. It stars Helen Mirren and Donald Sutherland, acting together for the first time since the 1990 film Bethune: The Making of a Hero. It was screened in the main competition section of the 74th Venice International Film Festival. Mirren received a Golden Globe nomination for her work in the film.

== Synopsis ==
An elderly couple, John and Ella, go on a road trip from Massachusetts to Florida to see Ernest Hemingway's residence in Key West. On their way, they muse on their relationships, learn hidden secrets about each other and encounter new experiences while coping with John's memory loss and Ella's terminal cancer.

== Cast ==
- Donald Sutherland as John Spencer
- Helen Mirren as Ella Spencer
- Christian McKay as Will Spencer
- Janel Moloney as Jane Spencer
- Dana Ivey as Lillian
- Dick Gregory as Dan Coleman
- Kirsty Mitchell as Jennifer Ward
- Robert Pralgo as Phillip
- Mylie Stone as Emily Ward

== Production ==
=== Development ===
The film reunited director Paolo Virzì with producers Fabrizio Donvito, Benedetto Habib, and Marco Cohen from the Indiana Production Company, since their collaboration in Human Capital and Like Crazy which also won many festival awards. It is also the director's first film shot solely in English.

Sutherland and Mirren had previously collaborated as a married couple in the Phillip Borsos directed China-set saga, Bethune: The Making of a Hero, and this is their first film together for 27 years.

=== Filming ===
Principal photography for the film began in July 2016 in Atlanta, where the crew's cars were damaged on set by flooding. A casting call for extras was sent out, and filming also took place in Stone Mountain and Dunwoody, Georgia. Other important scenes included Jekyll Island, Georgia, US 1 in Key West and the Hemingway House in Key West, Florida. Fisherman's Hospital is located in Marathon, Florida.

== Release ==
The film, based on the novel by Michael Zadoorian, was sold at Cannes by BAC Films. Sony Pictures Classics pre-emptively acquired distribution rights in the U.S., Latin America, Portugal, Eastern Europe, Russia, South Korea, China, India, Southeast Asia (excluding Taiwan and Singapore) and South Africa, while Focus Features acquired U.K. and Irish rights to the film in August 2017. It was released on March 9, 2018.

== Reception ==
=== Box office ===
The Leisure Seeker grossed $3.2 million in the United States and Canada, and approx. $16.1 million in other territories, for a worldwide total of $19.3 million.

=== Critical reception ===
On review aggregator Rotten Tomatoes, the film holds an approval rating of 38% based on 109 reviews, and an average rating of 5.2/10. The website's critical consensus reads, "The Leisure Seeker certainly doesn't suffer from any shortage of acting talent, but it's largely squandered on a predictable, diffuse drama with little to say." On Metacritic, the film has a weighted average score of 45 out of 100, based on 23 critics, indicating "mixed or average reviews".
