= Eye of the Needle (film) =

1981 film by Richard Marquand

- Theatrical release poster
- Directed by: Richard Marquand
- Screenplay by: Stanley Mann
- Based on: Eye of the Needle; 1978 novel by Ken Follett
- Produced by: Stephen J. Friedman
- Starring: Donald Sutherland; Kate Nelligan; Ian Bannen; Christopher Cazenove
- Cinematography: Alan Hume
- Edited by: Sean Barton
- Music by: Miklós Rózsa
- Production company: Kings Road Entertainment
- Distributed by: United Artists
- Release date: 24 July 1981 (U.S.)
- Running time: 112 minutes
- Country: United Kingdom
- Language: English
- Box office: $17.5 million

Eye of the Needle is a 1981 British spy film directed by Richard Marquand, and starring Donald Sutherland and Kate Nelligan. Written by Stanley Mann, it is based on the 1978 novel of the same title by Ken Follett.

The film is about a German Nazi spy in the United Kingdom during World War II who discovers vital information about the upcoming D-Day invasion and his attempt to return to Germany while he is stranded with a family on the isolated (fictional) Storm Island, off the coast of Scotland.

== Plot ==
Henry Faber is a cold, ruthless German sleeper agent nicknamed the "Needle" due to his preference for killing with a stiletto. While spying in England, he obtains critical intelligence of a massive military deception campaign to disguise the Allies' plans to invade Europe through Normandy rather than Pas de Calais as Nazi Germany High Command expects. However, Faber is unable to transmit the information to Germany. MI5, knowing that Faber's discoveries could foil D-Day, are hounding his every move. With his cover blown, Faber heads to Scotland to rendezvous with a German U-boat. He steals a boat but fierce weather strands him on Storm Island. There he meets Lucy, her disabled husband, David, a former RAF fighter pilot, and their young son, Jo. The only other person on the island is Tom, the elderly, alcoholic lighthouse keeper who operates the island's only two-way radio.

A passionate affair quickly develops between Faber and Lucy, whose marriage has been strained ever since a car crash four years earlier left David embittered over his paralyzed legs. David grows suspicious after discovering a small film canister hidden in Faber's coat pocket. When questioned about it, Faber throws David off a cliff, killing him. He then murders Tom who discovers him attempting to contact the U-boat with the island radio. Faber explains David's absence by telling Lucy he has been drinking with Tom, as he often does. However, Lucy finds David's body on the rocky shoreline. Lying to Faber, she flees with Jo. When Faber realizes Lucy knows about him, he pursues her. Lucy reaches the radio at the lighthouse and contacts the mainland. She is told that help will be sent immediately but it is vital that she destroy the transmitter, though is not told why. Lucy, alone and terrified, refuses.

When Faber finds her, Lucy tries fighting him off, but Faber takes Jo hostage, forcing Lucy to give him access to the radio. He radios the U-boat which is waiting nearby. Speaking in German, he attempts to dispatch his gathered intelligence. Lucy realizes his mission and blows the lighthouse's fuse, rendering the transmitter useless and Faber's vital information going unheard. Faber does not kill Lucy and instead heads to the shoreline cliffs and a small rowboat to rendezvous with the U-boat, which is now surfaced and clearly visible.

Lucy chases Faber with her husband's revolver. She implores him to stop. When he does not, she fatally shoots him before he can reach the submarine.

== Cast ==
- Donald Sutherland as Henry Faber
- Kate Nelligan as Lucy Rose
- Ian Bannen as Inspector Godliman
- Christopher Cazenove as David Rose
- Stephen MacKenna as Lieutenant
- Philip Martin Brown as Billy Parkin
- George Belbin as Lucy's Father
- Faith Brook as Lucy's Mother
- Barbara Graley as David's Mother
- Arthur Lovegrove as Peterson
- Barbara Ewing as Mrs. Garden
- Patrick Connor as Inspector Harris
- David Hayman as Canter
- Alex McCrindle as Tom
- John Bennett as Kleinmann
- Sam Kydd as Lock Keeper
- John Paul as Home Guard Captain
- Bill Nighy as Squadron Leader Blenkinsop
- Jonathan and Nicholas Haley (twins) as Jo (David and Lucy's son)
- Allan Surtees as Colonel Terry
- Rik Mayall as Sailor On Train
- Rupert Frazer as Muller

== Production ==
The Storm Island scenes were shot over eight weeks on the Isle of Mull, in the Inner Hebrides. The distinctive Connel Bridge appears in the film, and some of the location filming was shot at Blackbushe Airport, Yateley, and also at Nine Elms in London.

== Reception ==
Roger Ebert "admired the movie", giving it 3 stars out of 4, and stated that it "resembles nothing so much as one of those downbeat, plodding, quietly horrifying, and sometimes grimly funny war movies that used to be made by the British film industry, back when there was a British film industry." George Lucas was impressed by the film and hired director Richard Marquand to helm 1983’s Return of the Jedi.

On the review aggregator website Rotten Tomatoes, 85% of 20 critics' reviews are positive, with an average rating of 6.6/10. Metacritic, which uses a weighted average, assigned the film a score of 61 out of 100, based on 11 critics, indicating "generally favorable" reviews.

The second half of the 2006 Hindi Fanaa is reportedly inspired by Eye of the Needle.
