= Behind the Mask (2002 film) =

Behind the Mask: Unauthorized DVD
- Produced by: Slipknot
- Starring: Slipknot
- Distributed by: Music Video Distributors
- Release date: March 5, 2002
- Running time: 42 minutes
- Country: United States
- Language: English

Behind the Mask: The Unauthorized DVD is a 2002 documentary film about the American heavy metal band Slipknot. The single‑sided disc covers the band's formation, early development, and relationship with its fanbase but lacks subtitles and closed captions. Due to licensing restrictions, it includes no Slipknot music or performance footage.

== Personnel ==
Aside from their real names, band members are identified by numbers zero through eight.

Slipknot

- (#0) Sid Wilson – turntables
- (#1) Joey Jordison – drums, mixing
- (#2) Paul Gray – bass guitar
- (#3) Chris Fehn – custom percussion, backing vocals
- (#4) Jim Root – guitars
- (#5) Craig Jones – samplers, media, mixing
- (#6) Shawn Crahan – custom percussion, backing vocals, editing
- (#7) Mick Thomson – guitars
- (#8) Corey Taylor – vocals
