= Cultural depictions of Winston Churchill =

Winston Churchill as depicted in culture

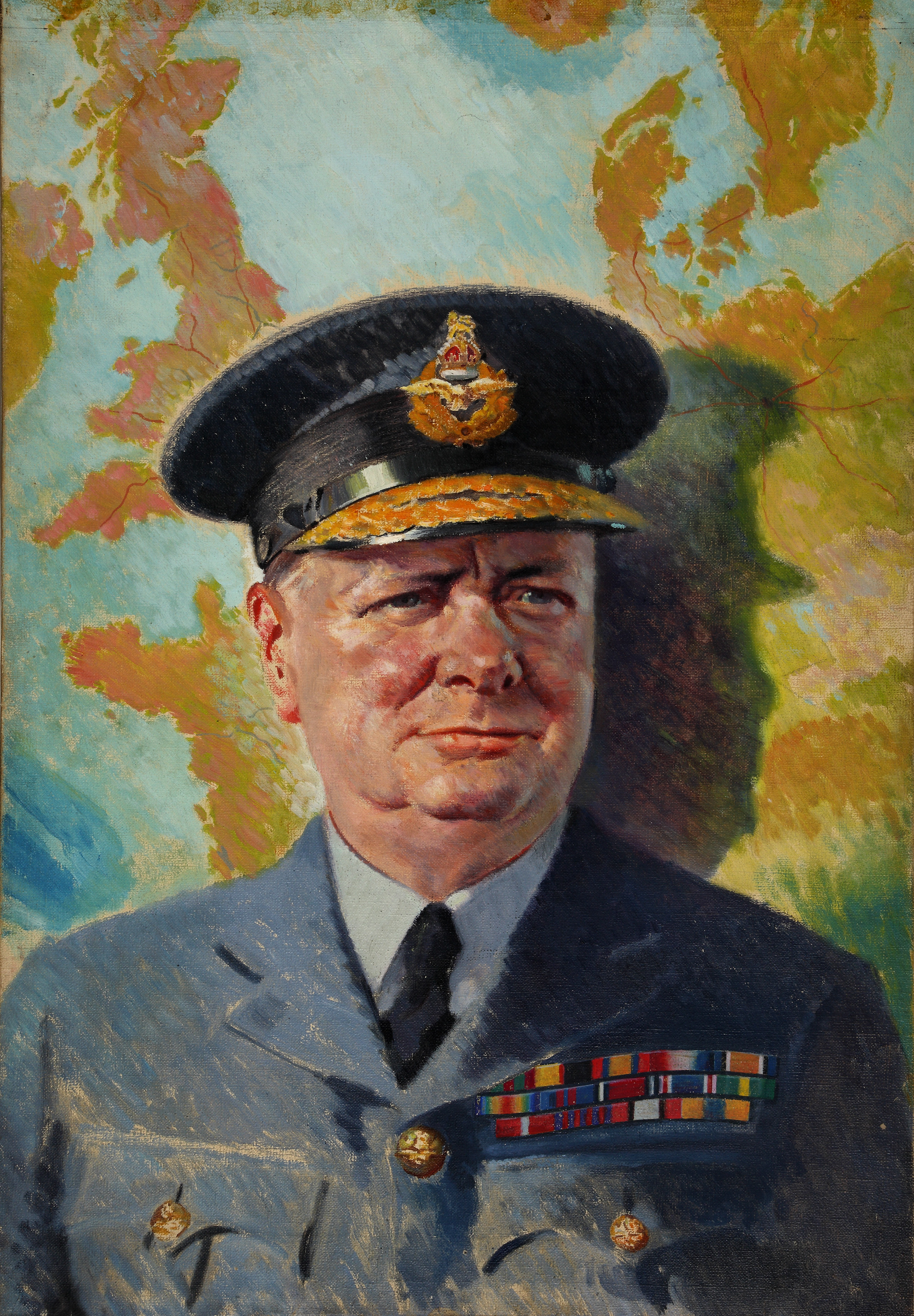
Winston Churchill in his honorary air commodore's uniform, c. 1940

Named the Greatest Briton of all time in a 2002 poll, and widely regarded as being among the most influential people in British history, Winston Churchill has been regularly portrayed in film, television, radio and other media. The depictions range from minor character to the biographical centerpiece, exceeding 30 films, more than two dozen television shows, several stage productions, and countless books.

== Film ==
=== Major biographical films ===
Below are films which serve as major biographical portrayals of Churchill, as opposed to other films which mention Churchill only as one part of a separate or secondary plotline.

- Young Winston 1972 film.
- Darkest Hour 2017 film starring Gary Oldman as Churchill

=== Table of films ===
Year	Country	Title	Actor	Notes
1935	United Kingdom	Royal Cavalcade	C.M. Hallard	
1941	Germany	Ohm Kruger	Otto Wernicke	
1943	United States	Mission to Moscow	Dudley Field Malone	
1949	Soviet Union	Stalingradskaya bitva I	Viktor Stanitsyn	
1950	Soviet Union	The Lights of Baku	Viktor Stanitsyn	
1950	Soviet Union	The Fall of Berlin	Viktor Stanitsyn	
1951	United States	An American in Paris	Dudley Field Malone	
1952	Soviet Union	Nezabyvaemyy god 1919 (Unforgettable 1919)	Viktor Stanitsyn	
1956	United Kingdom	The Man Who Never Was	Peter Sellers	Voice only
1960	United Kingdom	The Siege of Sidney Street	Jimmy Sangster	
1965	United Kingdom	Operation Crossbow	Patrick Wymark	
1970	Soviet Union East Germany Poland Yugoslavia Italy	Liberation	Yuri Durov	
1972	United Kingdom	Young Winston	Simon Ward	
1973	Yugoslavia	The Battle of Sutjeska	Orson Welles	
1973	Czech Republic	Days of Betrayal	Jan Vitek	
1976	United Kingdom	The Eagle Has Landed	Leigh Dilley	Plays a stand-in for the real Churchill
1978	Sweden	Picassos äventyr	Sune Mangs	
1979	Poland	Sekret Enigmy	Józef Zacharewicz	
1983	France	Le Bourreau des cœurs	René Douglas	
1984	Poland	Katastrofa w Gibraltarze	Wlodzimierz Wiszniewski	
1987	United Kingdom	Jane and the Lost City	Richard Huggett	
1989	Italy	Casablanca Express	John Evans	
1990	Soviet Union Czech Republic East Germany United States	Stalingrad	Ronald Lacey	
1994	France	Caro dolce amore	John Evans	
2000	India	Shaheed Uddham Singh: Alais Ram Mohammad Singh Azad	Joe Lamb	
2002	United Kingdom	Two Men Went to War	David Ryall	
2004	United Kingdom	Churchill: The Hollywood Years	Christian Slater	
2005	United Kingdom	Allegiance	Mel Smith	
2007	United Kingdom Germany	Sinking of the Lusitania: Terror at Sea	Martin Le Maitre	Docudrama
2009	United States Germany	Inglourious Basterds	Rod Taylor	
2010	United Kingdom	The King's Speech	Timothy Spall	
2010	Canada	Paradox	Alan C. Peterson	
2010	France	L'Appel du 18 Juin	Christian Rodska	TV Movie
2012	United States	FDR: American Badass!	Paul Willson	
2012	United States	The ABCs of Death	Torgny Gerhard Aanderaa	"H is for Hydro-Electric Diffusion"
2012	United States	Bad Ass	Tyler Tuione	
2015	United States	Queen of the Desert	Christopher Fulford	
2017	United Kingdom	Churchill	Brian Cox	
2017	United Kingdom United States	Darkest Hour	Gary Oldman	Won Academy Award for Best Actor
2017	India United Kingdom	Viceroy's House	Gerry George	
2017	Malta	The Mystery of the Britannic	George Fokin	Documentary
2018	United Kingdom	Suffragette	Ray Burnet	
2018	United Kingdom	The Battle for Britain's Heroes	Gerry George	
2019	United States France Iceland Ireland	The Professor and the Madman	Brendan Patricks	
2019	Turkey	Operation Cicero	Gerry George	
2020	Denmark	The Good Traitor	Nicholas Blane	
2021	India	Sardar Udham	Tom Hudson	
2021	Czech Republic	Audience u královny	Vladislav Benes	
2021	United Kingdom	Operation Mincemeat	Simon Russell Beale	
2024	United Kingdom	The Ministry of Ungentlemanly Warfare	Rory Kinnear	
2026	France	De Gaulle	Simon Russell Beale	
2026	United Kingdom	Fortitude	Michael Sheen	

== Television ==
=== Major biographical tv shows and tv movies ===
Below are shows and films on television which serve as major biographical portrayals of Churchill, as opposed to other films which mention Churchill only as one part of a separate plotline.

- The Gathering Storm (1974 film). TV film by BBC, with Richard Burton as Churchill.
- Winston Churchill: The Wilderness Years is an eight-part 1981 drama serial based on Winston Churchill's years in enforced exile from political position during the 1920s and 1930s. It was written and directed by Ferdinand Fairfax, with historian Martin Gilbert as co-writer. Churchill was played by Robert Hardy, who earned a BAFTA nomination for Best Actor and went on to play him in several other productions.
- World War II: When Lions Roared is a 1994 American war television miniseries, directed by Joseph Sargent, and starring Michael Caine, John Lithgow and Bob Hoskins as the three major Allied leaders, Joseph Stalin, Franklin D. Roosevelt and Winston Churchill respectively.
- The Gathering Storm (2002 film) The Gathering Storm is a BBC–HBO co-produced television biographical film about Winston Churchill in the years just prior to World War II.
- Into the Storm (2009 film) is a 2009 biographical film about Winston Churchill and his days in office during the Second World War, with Brendan Gleeson as Churchill. Into the Storm is a sequel to the 2002 television film The Gathering Storm, which details the life of Churchill in the years just prior the war.

=== Table of television films ===
Year	Country	Title	Actor	Notes
1960–1963	United Kingdom United States	The Valiant Years	Richard Burton	Documentary
1974	United Kingdom	Jennie: Lady Randolph Churchill	Warren Clarke	Episode "Lady Randolph"
1974	United Kingdom United States	The Gathering Storm	Richard Burton	
1975	United Kingdom	Days of Hope	Leo Britt	this is a relatively negative portrayal of Churchill that highlights his attitude towards the coal miners during the strikes of 1921 and 1926
1975	United Kingdom	Edward the Seventh	Christopher Strauli	
1977	United States	Eleanor and Franklin: The White House Years	Arthur Gould-Porter	
1978	United Kingdom	Edward & Mrs. Simpson	Wensley Pithey	
1979	United Kingdom	Churchill and the Generals	Timothy West	
1981	United Kingdom	The Life and Times of David Lloyd George	William Hootkins	
1983	United Kingdom	Winston Churchill: The Wilderness Years	Robert Hardy	
1983	United States	The Winds of War	Howard Lang	
1983	United Kingdom	Number 10	Terence Harvey	
1984	Australia	The Last Bastion	Timothy West	
1986	United Kingdom	Lord Mountbatten: The Last Viceroy	Malcolm Terris	
1988	United Kingdom	The Woman He Loved	Robert Hardy	
1988	United States	War and Remembrance	Robert Hardy	
1989	United Kingdom	Bomber Harris	Robert Hardy	
1991	United Kingdom	'Allo 'Allo!	John James Evanson	Episode "Up the Crick Without a Piddle"
1991	Ireland	The Treaty	Julian Fellowes	
1992	United Kingdom	A Dangerous Man: Lawrence After Arabia	Michael Cochrane	
1992	United States	The Young Indiana Jones Chronicles	Julian Fellowes	
1994	United States	World War II: When Lions Roared	Bob Hoskins	
1995	Japan Canada	Hiroshima	Timothy West	
1995	United States	Annie: A Royal Adventure!	David King	
1998	United Kingdom	Mosley	Hugh Simon	
2002	United Kingdom	Bertie and Elizabeth	David Ryall	
2002	United Kingdom United States	The Gathering Storm	Albert Finney	Won Primetime Emmy Award for Outstanding Lead Actor in a Miniseries or a Movie
2004	United Kingdom	Dunkirk	Simon Russell Beale	
2004	United States	Ike: Countdown to D-Day	Ian Mune	
2005	United Kingdom	Wallis and Edward	David Calder	
2006	United Kingdom	Agatha Christie's Marple – The Sittaford Mystery	Robert Hardy	
2006	Canada	Above and Beyond	Joss Ackland	
2008	United States	Family Guy	Seth MacFarlane	Episode "Road to Germany"
2009	United Kingdom United States	Into the Storm	Brendan Gleeson	Won Primetime Emmy Award for Outstanding Lead Actor in a Miniseries or a Movie
2009–present		Horrible Histories	Jim Howick, Jalaal Hartley	
2010–2011	United Kingdom	Doctor Who	Ian McNeice	Episodes "The Beast Below", "Victory of the Daleks", "The Pandorica Opens", "The Wedding of River Song"
2012	Hungary United Kingdom Canada	Titanic	Colm Gormley	
2012	France Italy Canada Ireland	Titanic: Blood and Steel	Robert Whitelock	
2013	Canada	Murdoch Mysteries	Thomas Howes	Episode "Winston's Lost Night"
2013–2014	United Kingdom	Peaky Blinders	Andy Nyman, Richard McCabe, Neil Maskell	
2014	United Kingdom	37 Days	Nicholas Asbury	
2014	United States	The World Wars	Ian Beyts, Tom Vickers	
2015	United Kingdom	Up the Women	Harry Peacock	Episode "Train"
2016	United Kingdom	Churchill's Secret	Michael Gambon	
2016	United Kingdom United States	The Crown	John Lithgow	Won Primetime Emmy Award for Outstanding Supporting Actor in a Drama Series
2016	United States	Super Science Friends	Adam Shaheen	
2016	United States	Drunk History	Louie Anderson	Episode "The Roosevelts"

== Theatre ==
- Winnie (1988) – Robin Hardy (premiere run in 1988)
- Never So Good (2007) – Ian McNeice (premiere run in 2007)
- Turning Point (2009) – Matthew Marsh
- Three Days in May (2011) – Warren Clarke (premiere run in 2011)
- The Audience (2013, London) – Edward Fox (replacing Robert Hardy, who withdrew prior to press night for health reasons)
- The Audience (2015, Broadway) – Dakin Matthews
- Sylvia (2018) – Delroy Atkinson
- When Winston Went to War with the Wireless (2023) – Adrian Scarborough

== Music ==
- The Kinks recorded "Mr. Churchill Says" for their 1969 album Arthur.
- The YouTube series Epic Rap Battles of History featured Dan Bull as Churchill in its fifth season; Churchill battled against Theodore Roosevelt, played by EpicLLOYD.
- Iron Maiden included parts of Churchill's famous speech "We shall fight on the beaches" in live versions of the song "Aces High" from the 1984 album Powerslave.
- Supertramp included parts of Churchill's famous speech "We shall fight on the beaches" in the song "Fool's Overture" from the 1977 album Even in the Quietest Moments....
- "Oliver's Army" by Elvis Costello
- "Stop the Cavalry" by Jona Lewie

== Radio ==
- Peter Sellers included Churchill as his standard PM for The Goon Show. Churchill is depicted as he was during World War II. In The Goon Show, he is of course treated humorously, having a very African foreign secretary called Basil (played by Ray Ellington in Red Bladder mode). In addition he is responsible for supporting Neddie Seagoon's harebrained plans for long-range, jet-propelled guided NAAFI's, atomic dustbins, and throwing batter puddings at Clement Attlee.
- Churchill's Other Lives, documentary series, played by Roger Allam (2011)

== Literature ==
- H. G. Wells, in his 1933 novel The Shape of Things to Come – a forecast of the future as it seemed to Wells on the basis of the 1934 situation – assumed that Winston Churchill's career was over and that he would have no active role to play in the Second World War, which Wells foresaw as breaking out in 1940, lasting until 1950 and culminating in the collapse of all parties to the conflict and a breakdown of European civilization. Wells assumed that Randolph Churchill, Winston's son, would take part in a valiant but doomed effort to avert the war, delivering a "brilliant pacifist speech [which] echoed throughout Europe", but failed to end the war.
- The protagonist of George Orwell's 1949 novel Nineteen Eighty Four is named Winston Smith. He is mentioned as being about forty years old in 1984, i.e. he was born in the last years of WWII and presumably was named for Winston Churchill.
- Churchill is a significant character in the 1995 novel Redemption by Leon Uris
- Players, a 1999 Doctor Who novel by Terrance Dicks
- The Hundred-Year-Old Man Who Climbed Out the Window and Disappeared (2012)
- Churchill is mentioned in the Grandpa's Great Escape, 2016 by David Walliams

There are various alternative history works depicting a Nazi German victory or an otherwise widely different course of WWII posit various ultimate fates for Churchill:

- In Len Deighton's 1978 SS-GB, Churchill refuses to escape Britain even when Nazi victory is certain. He is captured by the Nazis and executed, at his last moment defiantly making the V for Victory sign. In Len Deighton's 1981 XPD A group of former SS officers attempt to seize power in West Germany, in which they intend to publish some wartime documents about a secret meeting between Churchill and Hitler in June 1940.
- In James P. Hogan's 1985 The Proteus Operation, Lord Halifax cravenly surrenders to the Nazis without fighting. Churchill, holding no official position of any kind, organizes some of his neighbors for a foredoomed defiance, confronting the German soldiers who arrive in their countryside with an assortment of shotguns and all of them getting killed. Time travelers from a bleak world of the 1970s return to 1939, contact Churchill and Roosevelt and provide information enabling them to do better and defeat the Nazis, creating the history we know.
- In Leo Rutman's 1990 Clash of Eagles, Churchill escapes via the Bahamas. When the Nazis follow up their conquest of Britain with an invasion of the US, occupying New York City and much of the East Coast, the exile Churchill urges the Americans to go on resisting.
- A similar role is given to Churchill also in the Nazi-dominated 1960s of Robert Harris' 1992 Fatherland. Churchill and most of the British royal family escape to Canada where he leads a Government in exile.
- In Harry Turtledove's Worldwar series (1994–2004), in 1942 Extraterrestrials invaded Earth, forcing humans to stop fighting each other and unite to face the common threat. Churchill managers to beat off a large scale Extraterrestrial invasion of Britain, but must concede the reptile invaders – who prefer warm climates – in permanent occupation of most of the British Empire.
- Harry Turtledove's Southern Victory series (1997–2007) is based on an earlier diversion from the history we know – the Confederacy winning the American Civil War and from 1862 becoming a fully recognized sovereign nation. In this history, the Entente is defeated by the Central Powers in the First Great War of 1914–1917. In 1935, the Conservatives led by Churchill go into coalition with the Silvershirts and by 1941, they declare war on a Germany still ruled by a Kaizer. Under these circumstances, Churchill ends up in an uneasy alliance with a Hitler-analogue – Jake Featherston, demagogue dictator of the Confederacy, who is involved in a wholesale genocide of Blacks.
- In Harry Turtledove's 2003 In the Presence of Mine Enemies, Churchill and the remnants of the British Army resist to the bitter end, ultimately falling to defeat, though the exact circumstances of Churchill's death are undescribed.
- In Harry Turtledove's The War That Came Early series (2009–2014), elements in Neville Chamberlain's government are receptive to Rudolf Hess's proposal that Britain stop fighting the Nazis and rather join them in a war against the Soviet Union. When Churchill, the war minister, objects, he is killed in a suspicious car accident.
- In Newt Gingrich and William R. Forstchen's 1995 1945, Germany did not declare war on the US in 1941. In 1945 two separate wars end, the US victorious against Japan but the Nazis victorious in Europe. Britain remains unoccupied but its situation is precarious. In 1946 Churchill faces a land invasion of Britain, headed by Erwin Rommel, and bombings much more severe than the 1940 London Blitz, and is desperately begging for American help
- Winston's War (2002) – Michael Dobbs
- Never Surrender (2003) – Michael Dobbs
- Churchill's Hour (2004) – Michael Dobbs
- Churchill's Triumph (2005) – Michael Dobbs
- In Jo Walton's Farthing (2006) Rudolf Hess's flight to Scotland in May 1941 manages to successfully negotiate peace terms with the United Kingdom, mainly because the United States never gets involved with the conflict, this is because Imperial Japan never attacks Pearl Harbor, resulting in Churchill being removed from office and the British Empire pulling out of the war.
- In C. J. Sansom's 2012 Dominion, in the 1950s in which the Nazis occupy Great Britain through a puppet government, an ageing Churchill is leader-in-exile of the British resistance movement.
- In Philip K. Dick's The Man in the High Castle (1962) Where the Axis Powers won World War II. The story occurs in 1962, fifteen years after the end of the war in 1947, and depicts the political intrigues between Imperial Japan and Nazi Germany as they rule the partitioned United States. The Grasshopper Lies Heavy, by Hawthorne Abendsen, the story within the story, United Kingdom contributes more to the Allied war effort, leading to joint British and Russian forces capturing Berlin, the British Empire becomes militaristic, anti-American post war, and begins a cold war against the United States that the empire eventually wins, Churchill remains Prime Minister until his death.
- In Guy Saville's The Afrika Reich (2011) the United Kingdom is defeated by Nazi Germany during the Dunkirk Campaign, Churchill resigned, Lord Halifax becomes Prime Minister and signs a non-aggression pact with Germany ending the war.
- In Guy Walters' The Leader (2003), King Edward VIII never abdicates, marries Wallis Simpson, leading to Oswald Mosley winning the 1935 election, allying the United Kingdom with the Axis powers. Churchill and other anti-Nazi politicians are imprisoned on the Isle of Man.
- In Murray Davies Collaborator (2004) Nazis conquer the United Kingdom and the Irish Free State, Churchill along with the British Royal Family flee to Canada where he leads a government in exile.
- In Philip Kerr's Hitler's Peace (2005) Adolf Hitler, realising he is going to lose the war, tries to negotiate peace with Franklin D. Roosevelt, Joseph Stalin, Churchill refuses to listen and will only accept unconditional surrender.
- In Mike Resnick's alternate history anthology Alternate Tyrants (1997). In the short story "Children of Tears" by Adrienne Gormley After Boer uprisings in South Africa during World War II, Churchill imposes extreme measures throughout the British Empire with special attention being given to suppressing Indian nationalists such as Mohandas K. Gandhi, Jawaharlal Nehru, and Vinoba Bhave.
- In Kim Newman's The Bloody Red Baron (1995) Count Dracula is Supreme War Command of the Central Powers armies during World War I, Churchill who is a vampire in the world, is a member of Lord Ruthven's cabinet.
- In John Birmingham Axis of Time trilogy, a US-led multinational task force of advanced warships and submarines in 2021 deployment, the Nagoya conducts a full-scale test of its new systems but there is a catastrophic accident—the experiment generates a massive rift in the time-space continuum, destroying the Nagoya and sending most of the fleet back in time to 1942. In the second novel, Designated Targets (2005), Churchill prepares for "Operation Sea Dragon," an attempt to invade across the English Channel. Despite heavy losses sustained by the RAF and the damage to Biggin Hill, the Germans lost most of their navy. Any airborne units that reach England are quickly isolated and crushed by the Allies.

== Miscellaneous ==
- The 2012 Summer Olympics opening ceremony featured an animated version of Churchill's statue in Parliament Square, which James Bond and the Queen fly over in a helicopter: as they salute him, he raises his cane in response. It also featured an appearance from Timothy Spall as Winston Churchill.
- Churchill was featured in Ubisoft's Assassin's Creed: Syndicate as an ally to Lydia Frye.
- Churchill was supposed to appear in the 1941 film Citizen Kane with Charles Foster Kane during the News on the March sequence but was cut due to runtime.
- A paperweight likeness of Churchill, based on a portrait by Dora Marr, was produced in a limited number by Baccarat in 1954.
- Churchill is one of the main characters in the webseries Super Science Friends. He assembles a team of famous scientists to win World War II. He is voiced by Adam Shaheen.
- A fictionalised Churchill appeared in the Strike Witches series.
- Doctor Who: The Churchill Years is a series of audio drama released by Big Finish Productions, Ian McNeice reprises his role as Churchill from the TV show.
- Churchill is currently being portrayed by British actor David Payne in a solo performance tour in the United States.
- Churchill appears as a playable leader in Civilization, appearing as a playable character in scenarios related to World War II.
