= Liam Devlin =

- First appearance: The Eagle Has Landed
- Created by: Jack Higgins
- Portrayed by: Donald Sutherland; Keith Carradine

In-universe information
- Gender: Male
- Occupation: Spy; Assassin
- Nationality: Irish

Liam Devlin is a protagonist and recurring character in the novels of Jack Higgins. "Liam Devlin" is a pseudonym and his real name is never revealed.

== Fictional biography ==
=== Early life ===
Liam Devlin is described as being born in County Down, Northern Ireland, and having attended Trinity College Dublin. However, during a visit to Belfast, he witnesses his elderly uncle, a Catholic priest, being assaulted by a Protestant mob. When the members of the Irish Republican Army attempt to defend the church building, Devlin picks up a gun and joins them.

Devlin later receives the assignment to hunt down and assassinate two British informers who have fled to America. He succeeds and is later described by a Scotland Yard detective as "the most cold blooded executioner the movement has seen since Collins and his murder squad".

During the Spanish Civil War, Devlin volunteers for the Connolly Column and is later captured by Falangist forces. While in a detention camp, he is recruited by Germany's military intelligence service, the Abwehr. During an intelligence mission inside the neutral Irish Free State, he is captured after a gunfight with the Garda Síochána, but later escapes from hospital in Dublin. The incident has left him with bullet scar on the forehead.

=== Kidnapping Churchill ===
In the 1975 novel The Eagle Has Landed, Devlin has recovered from his wounds and is teaching Irish language literature at Friedrich Wilhelm University in Berlin. He is then approached by Colonel Radl of the Abwehr and recruited into a secret mission to kidnap Winston Churchill. He is parachuted near the Northern Ireland border and makes his way into England, posing as an Irish veteran of the British Army. While scouting for the arrival of German paratroopers in Norfolk, Devlin poses as a stereotypical "bog Irishman." He also meets and falls in love with Molly Prior, a young girl from the village of Studley Constable. He subsequently saves her from a would-be rapist and introduces her to the poetry of Antoine Ó Raifteirí. Soon after, they make love. In later novels, Devlin thinks about Molly from time to time.

When the German soldiers commanded by Col. Kurt Steiner arrive, they pose as Free Polish troops. Molly is overjoyed, believing that Devlin is still in the British Army and not a black marketeer like she had previously thought. However, one of the paratroopers is killed while rescuing two village children in an accident and his German uniform is seen by the villagers. As a result, the villagers and their priest are taken hostage and hidden in the village's Roman Catholic church. The priest's sister is able to escape and inform a nearby unit of the United States Army. Although enraged and betrayed when she learns of Devlin's true loyalties, Molly has no desire to see him killed by the Americans. When she warns him, however, he refuses to flee and says that he is going to the church to die alongside the Germans. Before he leaves, he insists that he is not a traitor, but a man serving his country. He has also left a letter on the mantel expressing his love for her and saying goodbye.

When the Americans arrive, Col. Steiner releases the hostages so that they will not be caught in the crossfire. After a violent gunfight, Molly arrives and reveals a secret tunnel out of the church. Col. Steiner, however, slips back into the village and is officially killed while trying to gun down Churchill, who is later revealed to have been a decoy. Devlin and the last surviving member of Steiner's unit are rescued at the seaside by a German E-boat.

=== Rescuing Steiner ===
In the later novel The Eagle Has Flown, Steiner is revealed to have survived, but is imprisoned in Britain. Devlin, who is hiding in Lisbon and planning to escape to America, is persuaded by SS General Walter Schellenberg, then chief of the Ausland-SD, to rescue Steiner from the Tower of London. After they return to Germany, Devlin and Steiner prevent Reichsführer-SS Heinrich Himmler from seizing control of the Reich. In the aftermath, Himmler orders Schellenberg to murder them. Instead, Schellenberg arranges their escape to the neutral Irish Free State. The novel ending states that Devlin now lives in a cottage in County Mayo and that he and Steiner remain friends.

== Other appearances ==
As well as appearing in The Eagle Has Landed and The Eagle Has Flown, Devlin also appears as a major character in the Higgins novels Touch the Devil and Confessional. In other novels, Devlin has made cameo appearances as a mentor to Sean Dillon (in Drink with the Devil, The President's Daughter and Day of Reckoning) and Martin Brosnan (in Eye of the Storm).

== In other media ==
=== Film ===
In the film version of The Eagle Has Landed (1976), Liam Devlin was portrayed by Donald Sutherland.

=== Television ===
In the television version of Confessional (1989), Liam Devlin was portrayed by Keith Carradine.
