= Antoine Ó Raifteirí =

Irish poet (1779–1835)

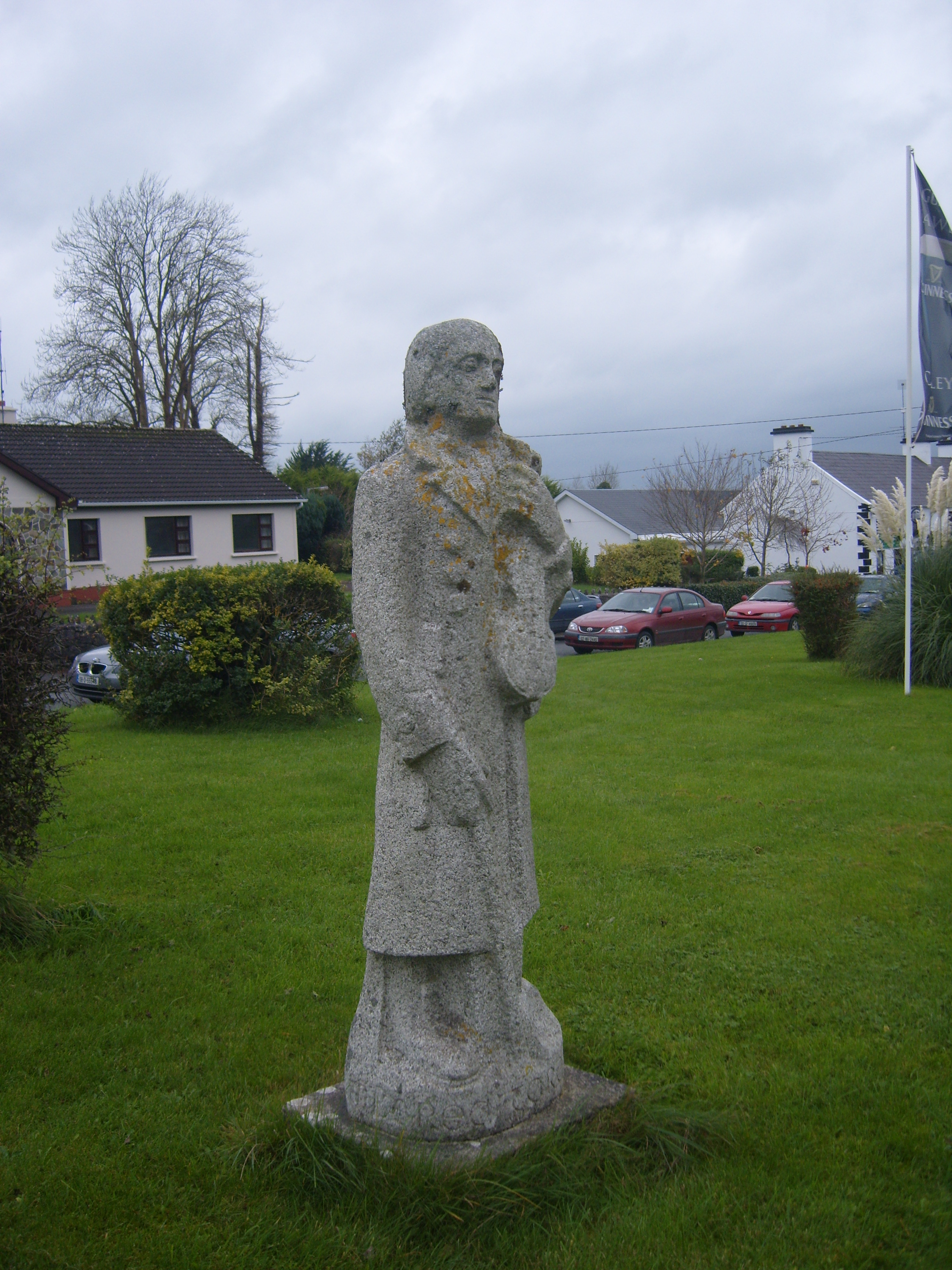
- Statue in Craughwell
- Born: 30 March 1779; Kiltimagh, County Mayo, Ireland
- Died: 25 December 1835 (aged 56); Craughwell, County Galway, Ireland
- Resting place: Killeeneen Cemetery, Craughwell
- Writing career
- Language: Irish
- Genre: poetry
- Notable works: Eanach Dhúin, Cill Aodáin

Antoine Ó Raifteirí (also Antoine Ó Reachtabhra, or Anthony Raftery; 30 March 1779 – 25 December 1835) was an Irish language poet who is often called the last of the wandering bards.

== Biography ==
Antoine Ó Raifteirí was born in Killedan, near Kiltimagh in County Mayo. His father was a weaver. He had come to Killedan from County Sligo to work for the local landlord, Frank Taaffe. Ó Raifteirí's mother was a Brennan from the Kiltimagh area. She and her husband had nine children. Ó Raifteirí was an intelligent and inquisitive child. Some time between 1785 and 1788, his life took a huge turn. It all started with a cough, and soon two of the children began experiencing headaches. Another child had a high fever. A rash appeared on Ó Raifteirí's hand, and it caused severe itching. Soon the children were covered in that same rash, they had contracted smallpox. Within three weeks, eight of the nine children had died. One of the last things young Ó Raifteirí saw before going blind was his eight siblings laid out dead upon the floor.

As Ó Raifteirí's father was a weaver, he had not experienced the worst of that era's poverty, but it would be much more difficult for his son to escape hardship. He lived by playing his fiddle and performing his songs and poems in the mansions of the Anglo-Irish gentry. His work draws on the forms and idiom of Irish poetry, and although it is conventionally regarded as marking the end of the old literary tradition, Ó Raifteirí and his fellow poets did not see themselves in this way.

In common with earlier poets, Ó Raifteirí had a patron in Taaffe. One night Taaffe sent a servant to get more drink for the house. The servant took Ó Raifteirí with him, both of them on one of Taaffe's good horses. Whatever the cause (said to be speeding) Ó Raifteirí's horse left the road and ended up in the bog, drowned or with a broken neck. Taaffe banished Ó Raifteirí and he commenced the life of an itinerant. According to An Craoibhín (Douglas Hyde) one version of the story is that Ó Raifteirí wrote Cill Aodáin (as DH Kileadan, County Mayo, his most famous work apart from Anach Cuan, to get back in Frank Taaffe's good books. Taaffe however was displeased at the awkward way Ó Raifteirí worked his name into the poem, and then only at the end. Another version has it that Ó Raifteirí wrote this poem in competition to win a bet as to who could praise their own place best. When he finished reciting the poem his competitor is reported to have said "Bad luck to you Raftery, you have left nothing at all for the people of Galway" and refused to recite his own poem.

None of his poems were written down during the poet's lifetime, but they were collected from those he taught them to by An Craoibhín Aoibhinn Douglas Hyde, Lady Gregory and others, who later published them.

Ó Raifteirí was lithe and spare in build and not very tall but he was very strong and considered a good wrestler. He always wore a long frieze coat and corduroy breeches.

Ó Raifteirí died at the house of Diarmuid Cloonan of Killeeneen, near Craughwell, County Galway, and was buried in nearby Killeeneen Cemetery. In 1900, Lady Gregory, Edward Martyn, and W. B. Yeats erected a memorial stone over his grave, bearing the inscription "RAFTERY". A statue of him stands in the village green, Craughwell, opposite Cawley's pub.

== Poetry ==
Ó Raifteirí's most enduring poems include Eanach Dhúin and Cill Aodáin which are still learned by Irish schoolchildren. His poems, as Ó Coigligh points out, are not the personal, private expressions that we associate with poetry nowadays. Rather, he says, the poems give voice to the people, and that the poet's role is in shaping public opinion by effective, well-written verse.

=== Eanach Dhúin ===
Má fhaighimse sláinte is fada bheidh trácht
Ar an méid a bádh as Eanach Cuain.
'S mo thrua 'márach gach athair 's máthair
Bean is páiste 'tá á sileadh súl!
A Rí na nGrást a cheap neamh is párthas,
Nar bheag an tábhacht dúinn beirt no triúr,
Ach lá chomh breá leis gan gaoth ná báisteach
Lán a bháid acu scuab ar shiúl.

Nár mhór an t-íonadh ós comhair na ndaoine
Á bhfeicáil sínte ar chúl a gcinn,
Screadadh 'gus caoineadh a scanródh daoine,
Gruaig á cíoradh 's an chreach á roinnt.
Bhí buachaillí óg ann tíocht an fhómhair,
Á síneadh chrochar, is a dtabhairt go cill.
'S gurb é gléas a bpósta a bhí dá dtoramh
'S a Rí na Glóire nár mhór an feall.

Translation:

If my health is spared I'll be long relating
Of the number who drowned from Annaghdown.
And the keening after of mother and father
And child by the harbour, the mournful croon!
King of Graces, who died to save us,
T'were a small affair but for one or two,
But a boat-load bravely in calm day sailing
Without storm or rain to be swept to doom.

What wild despair was on all the faces
To see them there in the light of day,
In every place there was lamentation,
And tearing of hair as the wreck was shared.
And boys there lying when crops were ripening,
From the strength of life they were borne to clay
In their wedding clothes for their wake they robed them
O King of Glory, man's hope is in vain.

=== Cill Aodáin ===
These are the opening two verses of "Cill Aodáin":

Anois teacht an earraigh
beidh an lá ag dul chun síneadh,
Is tar éis na féil Bríde
ardóidh mé mo sheol.

Ó chuir mé i mo cheann é
ní chónóidh mé choíche
Go seasfaidh mé síos
i lár Chontae Mhaigh Eo.

I gClár Chlainne Mhuiris
A bheas mé an chéad oíche,
Is i mballa taobh thíos de
A thosóidh mé ag ól.

Go Coillte Mách rachaidh
Go ndéanfadh cuairt mhíosa ann
I bhfogas dhá mhíle
Do Bhéal an Átha Mhóir

Translation:

Now coming of the Spring
the day will be lengthening,
and after St. Brigid's Day
I shall raise my sail.

Since I put it into my head
I shall never stay put
until I shall stand down
in the centre of County Mayo.

In Claremorris
I will be the first night,
and in Balla just below it
I will begin to drink.

to Kiltimagh I shall go
until I shall make a month's visit there
as close as two miles
to Ballinamore.

== Legacy ==
- The first four lines of "Mise Raifteirí an File" appeared on the reverse of the Series C Irish five pound note. However, modern scholars do not believe him to be the author of the poem.

Mise Raifteirí, an file,
lán dóchais is grá
le súile gan solas,
ciúineas gan crá

Dul siar ar m'aistear,
le solas mo chroí
Fann agus tuirseach,
go deireadh mo shlí

Féach anois mé
mo dhroim le balla,
Ag seinm ceoil
do phócaí folmha.

Translation:

I am Raifteirí, the poet,
full of hope and love
With eyes without light,
silence without torment.

Going back on my journey,
with the light of my heart
Weak and tired,
until the end of my way.

Look at me now
my back to the wall,
playing music
to empty pockets.

- Douglas Hyde wrote a play called The Marriage (An Pósadh) where a poor newlywed couple is visited by Raftery on their wedding day. The bard attracts a lot of people with his music, and leaves after giving the couple all the numerous gifts given to him for it. Soon after, it is discovered that Raftery had actually been dead for a while.
- The author James Stephens published English translations of poems attributed to Ó Raifteirí in his book Reincarnations. The American composer Samuel Barber wrote a composition for mixed chorus – also entitled Reincarnations – based on three of the poems translated by Stephens.
- Irish-American writer Donn Byrne published Blind Raftery and His Wife Hilaria (1924), a fictionalised biography.
- Irish composer Joan Trimble wrote a television opera, Blind Raftery, first broadcast by the BBC in May 1957. The story is an adaptation by Cedric Cliffe of Donn Byrne's 1924 novel (see above).
- An annual festival, Féile Raifteirí, is held in Loughrea, County Galway each year on the last weekend in March. Ó Raifteirí spent most of his later years in townlands close to the town. The festival features a contemporary Irish language poet and promotes the native arts of Ireland. The festival ends with a visit to his grave in neighbouring Craughwell.
- Kiltimagh town square features a granite memorial in honour of Antoine Ó Raifteirí erected in 1985, in that same year Kiltimagh twinned with Craughwell, the final resting place of the blind Gaelic poet.
- Scoil Raifteirí, an All-Irish Primary School in Castlebar, County Mayo is named in honour of the poet.
- The Raftery Room Restaurant is located in Kiltimagh Main Street*
- Ó Raifteirí is mentioned in passing by IRA member Liam Devlin in Jack Higgins's 1975 novel The Eagle Has Landed.
- In 2011 Seán Ó Cualáin directed a feature film Mise Raiftearaí an Fíodóir Focal/I am Raifteirí, The Weaver of Words documenting the life of Ó Raifteirí, which was produced by Sonta Teo for TG4, and featured Irish actor Aindrias de Staic in the lead role as Ó Raifteirí.
- A street on the Ballymagroarty estate in Derry, Raftery Close, is named after Antoine Ó Raifteirí. All the streets in the estate are named after Irish writers.
- Sketch of Raifteirí http://www.irishpage.com/graf/raftery.gif
- In Radclyffe Hall's novel The Well of Loneliness, Stephen Gordon's horse is named Raftery after the Irish poet.
- Bob Dylan's 2020 song "I Contain Multitudes" contains the line "Follow me close, I'm going to Bally-na-Lee", presumed by Richard F. Thomas, Paul Muldoon, Brian Hiatt, and others to be a reference to Raifteirí's "The Lass From Bally-na-lee" ("Agus gluais go lá liom go Baile Uí Laí" / "So walk with me to Bally-na-Lee").
- Liam Clancy speaks Raifteirí's poem "Mary Hynes" over music in a song which appears on the compilation CD Favourites (2005)
