= Storm Warning =

Storm Warning(s) may refer to:

- Storm warning, a meteorological warning about a coming storm

== Literature ==
- Storm Warning (Higgins novel), a 1976 novel by Jack Higgins
- Storm Warning, a 1994 fantasy novel by Mercedes Lackey
- Storm Warning (Park novel), a 2010 novel by Linda Sue Park
- Storm Warning, a 2000 novel by Monica Hughes

== Film, television, and radio ==
- Storm Warning (1950 film), a film starring Ginger Rogers and Ronald Reagan
- Storm Warning (2007 film), a film starring Nadia Farès and John Brumpton
- "Storm Warnings", a 2003 episode of The Wire
- Storm Warning (audio drama), a Doctor Who audio drama

== Music ==
- Storm Warning!, a 1965 album by the Dick Morrissey Quartet
- Storm Warning, a 2007 album by Tinsley Ellis
- Storm Warning, a 1981 album by Murray McLauchlan
- Stormwarning (Steve Roach album), 1989
- Stormwarning (Ten album), 2011

=== Songs ===
- "Storm Warning", a 1959 instrumental by Dr. John
- "Storm Warning", a 2025 song by Gavin James
- "Storm Warning" (song), a 2011 single by Hunter Hayes
