= The Killing Ground =

The Killing Ground may refer to:

- The Killing Ground (film), a 1979 documentary film written by Brit Hume
- The Killing Ground (novel), a novel by Jack Higgins
- Killing Ground (film), a 2016 horror thriller film directed and written by Damien Power
- Killing Ground (novel), a novel by Steve Lyons based on the British television series Doctor Who
- Killing Ground (album), an album by Saxon
- "The Killing Ground", a song by Recoil on their album subHuman
- "The Killing Ground", a song by King Gizzard & the Lizard Wizard from their album Eyes Like the Sky
- "Killing Ground", a song by Sabaton from their album Carolus Rex
