= Jack Levin (producer) =

American television producer (1914–1999)

Jack Levin (born John Douglas Le Vien; 17 July 1914 – 9 November 1999) was an American television producer, active in British and American television.

== Early life ==
Le Vien was born in New York City in 1914. In 1930, he was employed by Pathé News as an office boy. He eventually was promoted to film editing and then to reporting.

== Career ==
Le Vien joined the U.S. Army in 1941 and was commissioned as a public relations officer. Promoted to lieutenant colonel he became a senior press aide to General Eisenhower, taking part in the North African, Sicilian, Italian and Normandy landings. After the war, he returned to Pathe as news editor, then editor-in-chief and vice-president. After Pathe closed their office, Le Vien established his own film and TV production company. In 1961, he was the executive producer of The Valiant Years a documentary made by ABC television with the cooperation of the BBC. Subsequently, Le Vien turned the documentary into a book, Winston Churchill: The Valiant Years, published in 1962. The same year, he was the executive producer of the Black Fox: The Rise and Fall of Adolf Hitler, which won the 1963 Academy Award for Best Documentary Feature. The following year, he adapted footage from The Valiant Years into the documentary The Finest Hours, resulting in his nomination for an Academy Award for Best Documentary Feature

During his career, Le Vien and his wife, Josephine, became friends of the Churchills and the Duke and Duchess of Windsor and in 1965 he made A King's Story, a film about the Windsors. Le Vien was nominated for a second Academy Award for Best Documentary Feature for this film. Partnering with the BBC, Le Vien he went on to produce dramatized versions Churchill's life to include Walk With Destiny, starring Richard Burton and Churchill and the Generals with Timothy West starring as Churchill. Le Vien also wrote books to accompany these projects.

In 1962 Le Vien appeared as himself on the game show To Tell the Truth. He was introduced as a television producer, colonel in the Army Reserves and a biographer of Winston Churchill. After his identity was revealed, host Bud Collyer mentioned that Le Vien was working on a documentary of the Windsors.

== Death ==
Le Vien died in 1999 at his residence in London. He was survived by his wife Josephine.

== Selected filmography ==
- The Valiant Years, 1961
- The Finest Hours, 1964
- A King's Story, 1965
- The Other World of Winston Churchill, 1966
- The Gathering Storm, 1974
- The Amazing Voyage of Daffodil and Daisy, 1975
- Where the Lotus Fell, 1976
- The Story of Cicero, The Queen's Drum Horse, 1977
- Churchill and the Generals, 1979
- The Glittering Crowns, 1981
- A Question of Choice, 1983
- Whicker!, 1984

== Books ==
- Winston Churchill: The Valiant Years
