= The Finest Hours (1964 film) =

1964 British film by Peter Baylis

- Film poster
- Directed by: Peter Baylis
- Written by: Victor Wolfson
- Based on: Churchill's Memoirs of the Second World War
- Produced by: Jack Levin
- Narrated by: Orson Welles
- Cinematography: Hone Glendinning
- Production company: Le Vien International
- Distributed by: BLC/Columbia (a joint venture of British Lion and Columbia
- Release dates: 29 September 1964 (United Kingdom); 10 November 1964 (United States)
- Running time: 116 minutes
- Country: United Kingdom
- Language: English

The Finest Hours is a 1964 British documentary film about Winston Churchill, directed by Peter Baylis. It was written by Victor Wolfson based on Churchill's book series Memoirs of the Second World War.

== Cast ==
- George Baker as Lord Randolph (voice)
- Faith Brook as Lady Randolph (voice)
- David Healy as newsreel Commentator
- Orson Welles as narrator (voice)
- George Westbury as Churchill as a boy (voice)
- Patrick Wymark as Churchill (voice)

== Reception ==
The Monthly Film Bulletin wrote: "This is a straightforward hero-worshipping, but not entirely reverential, biography of Churchill, based largely on the newsreels and still photographs through which the producer Jack Le Vien has already combed to make his television series The Valiant Years. Apart from a slightly embarrassing opening scene in which a Churchill-like child is building sand castles in the face of an incoming tide, there is little imaginativeness, for good or ill, in the treatment. ... All in all, the result is an uncontroversial interim report on an eminent life, lacking the perspective of history and glossing over many political errors, but full of interest for those who were too young to remember Churchill's war leadership."

Variety wrote: "With infinite patience and enthusiasm Jack Le Vien has produced a fascinating tribute to Sir Winston Churchill which, while not kowtowing to the man, amply reveals Le Vien's admiration and respect for Britain's great war leader. ... Without the interest and co-operation of Churchill Le Vien's task would have been impossible. As it is, he and his team of researchers and technicians have done a sound job in compressing such a large canvas into the workmanlike span of 116 minutes."

== Release and Accolades ==
Columbia Pictures released The Finest Hours in the United States in 1964. The film was nominated for a Academy Award for Best Documentary Feature in 1965.

== See also ==
- Orson Welles filmography
