= Storm Warning (Higgins novel) =

1976 novel by Jack Higgins

- First edition (UK)
- Author: Jack Higgins
- Language: English
- Genre: Thriller & War novel
- Publisher: Collins (UK); Holt, Rinehart & Winston (US)
- Publication date: 9 August 1976
- Publication place: United Kingdom
- Media type: Print (Hardcover and Paperback)
- Pages: 280 pp (hardcover edition)); 240 pp (paperback edition)
- ISBN: 0-00-222460-7 (hardcover edition); ISBN 0-330-25035-3 (paperback edition)
- OCLC: 2681211
- Dewey Decimal: 823/.9/14
- LC Class: PZ4.H6367 St PR6058.I343
- Preceded by: The Eagle Has Landed
- Followed by: The Valhalla Exchange

Storm Warning is a 1976 novel by Jack Higgins The novel was Higgins's next after his 1975 bestseller The Eagle Has Landed.

== Plot ==
A German sailing ship, Deutschland, with a crew of twenty-two men and with five nuns as passengers, attempts to return to Germany from Brazil at the end of August 1944.

After crossing the Atlantic and avoiding enemy shipping, the Deutschland is severely battered by a storm and then wrecked off the Outer Hebrides. A disparate group of characters from both sides comes to the crew's rescue.

== Reception ==
Kirkus Reviews stated that Storm Warning was: "something of a letdown" after The Eagle Has Landed.

== Film adaptation ==
In January 1977 it was announced that Columbia had bought the film rights and Peter Guber would produce a movie version. However no film resulted.
