= Night of the Fox =

1990 film by Charles Jarrott

- Written by: Jack Higgins; Bennett Cohen
- Directed by: Charles Jarrott
- Starring: George Peppard; Michael York; Deborah Raffin; John Mills; Juliet Mills
- Music by: Vladimir Cosma
- Country of origin: United States
- Original language: English

Production
- Running time: 200 minutes

Original release
- Release: November 28, 1990

Night of the Fox is a 1990 made-for-TV film by Charles Jarrott, based on the 1986 novel of the same name written by Jack Higgins. It was broadcast in France on TF1.

== Plot ==
Professor Alan Stacy visits Jersey to complete his biography of his friend and pre-World War II fellow academic Harry Martineau, but arrives on the day of Harry's funeral. Only one mourner is present, Dr. Sarah Drayton, who explains the two of them worked for Special Operations Executive (SOE) during the war. She shows Stacy a photo of them posing with Field Marshal Erwin Rommel and then tells the story behind the photo.

In the aftermath of the Slapton Sands disaster during World War II, US Army Colonel Hugh Kelso is washed ashore on Jersey and rescued by Hélène de Ville who contacts London. Brigadier Dougal Munro of SOE is aware Kelso knows top secret details of the planned D-Day landings and decides Kelso must either be rescued or eliminated. He recruits Harry Martineau, a retired spy and former academic, and Sarah Drayton, a nurse with connections in Jersey. Harry is persuaded to undertake one last job. Having previously operated in Germany, he becomes SD Standartenführer Max Vogel. He is supplied with a forged letter of authority signed by Hitler and Himmler. Sarah assumes the identity of Anne-Marie de la Tour, his expensive French mistress.

The two are smuggled to France and then travel to occupied Jersey, Harry on a naval vessel, the civilian Sarah on a cargo boat commanded by Italian naval officer Captain Guido Orsini. Kelso is alarmed by their arrival, familiar with Harry's reputation as a cold-blooded killer. The plan to evacuate the wounded Kelso is upset by the arrival of Field Marshal Erwin Rommel on a surprise tour of inspection. But no one in the party and only one of the German officers is aware that ‘Rommel’ is actually Corporal Erich Berger, an actor serving as Rommel's double. The real Rommel has been drawn into a plot to assassinate Hitler and needs to be temporarily away from Germany.

A small airplane is sitting at the airfield for the weekly mail flight, but the flight cannot be commandeered except by special authority. Harry unmasks ‘Rommel’ as Berger and gets him to give that authority. Berger agrees to cooperate and reveals that he is actually Heini Baum, a German Jew who has assumed the identity of the dead Berger and has survived as a soldier.

The operation is nearly upset by the arrival of a German military policeman who holds them at gunpoint, but he is overpowered and placed in a car which is set on fire and pushed over a cliff. Sarah, Harry, Baum and Orsini, who has agreed to assist them, commandeer the plane and fly towards France. The crew are overpowered and ordered to fly to England.

The plan is discovered, too late, but a Luftwaffe night fighter is dispatched to shoot them down. One of the crew is killed, and Harry orders the pilot to drop to almost sea-level, drawing down the pursuing fighter, which crashes. They continue to England, now in radio contact with the RAF.

On landing, they are surrounded by armed soldiers. Baum rushes excitedly forward and is shot by a guard, ostensibly by accident but probably on Munro's orders. As he dies, he begs Harry to say Kaddish for him.

The action returns to the present, and Sarah reveals that she later married Orsini and lived in Florence as Contessa Orsini. She tells Stacy that Harry continued to work for SOE but was shot down by friendly fire a few months later. His body, buried in the Essex marshes, was not found until recently and he has now received a much belated burial.

== Cast ==
- George Peppard as Harry Martineau / Standartenfuhrer Max Vogel
- Deborah Raffin as Sarah Drayton
- Michael York as Erwin Rommel / Berger / Baum
- David Birney as Hugh Kelso
- John Mills as Dougal Munro
- John Standing as Alan Stacey
- Amadeus August as Muller
- Andrea Occhipinti as Orsini
- Andréa Ferréol as Hélène de Ville
- Gottfried John as Hofer
- Juliet Mills as Barmaid
- George Mikell as Major Hecker
- Demeter Bitenc as Col. Halder
- Vincent Grass as Greiser
