= The Last Place God Made =

1971 book by Jack Higgins

First edition (publ. Collins)

The Last Place God Made is a novel by British novelist Jack Higgins, published in 1971. It is about a bush pilot in the Amazon in the time immediately before the outbreak of the Second World War.
