= A Fine Night for Dying =

1969 novel by Jack Higgins

- First edition
- Author: Jack Higgins (originally Martin J Fallon)
- Language: English
- Genre: Spy novel
- Published: 1969 (John Long Ltd)
- Publication place: United Kingdom
- Media type: Print (Hardcover and Paperback)
- Pages: 184 pp (hardcover edition)); 183 pp (paperback edition)
- ISBN: 0-09-098270-3 (hardcover edition); ISBN ? (paperback edition)
- OCLC: 30283205

A Fine Night for Dying is a 1969 novel by Jack Higgins originally published under the pseudonym Martin Fallon. Set on the high seas, it features spy Paul Chavasse.

== Plot summary ==
Weighted down by chain, the body of gangland boss Harvey Preston is dragged out of the English Channel in a fisherman's net. British Intelligence suspects a connection with a minor cross-channel smuggling ring, and sends dogged undercover agent Paul Chavasse to find answers.

Chavasse soon discovers that this is no small-time operation; it reaches throughout the world and leads to the doors of some very ruthless and powerful men. Men who aren't about to let Chavasse interfere with the delivery of their precious cargo...
