= The Eagle Has Landed (film) =

1976 film by John Sturges

- Theatrical release poster
- Directed by: John Sturges
- Screenplay by: Tom Mankiewicz
- Based on: The Eagle Has Landed (1975 novel) by Jack Higgins
- Produced by: David Niven Jr.; Jack Wiener
- Starring: Michael Caine; Donald Sutherland; Robert Duvall; Jenny Agutter; Donald Pleasence; Anthony Quayle; Jean Marsh; Sven-Bertil Taube; Judy Geeson; Siegfried Rauch; John Standing; Treat Williams; Larry Hagman
- Cinematography: Anthony B. Richmond
- Edited by: Anne V. Coates
- Music by: Lalo Schifrin
- Production company: ITC Entertainment
- Distributed by: Cinema International Corporation (UK)
- Release dates: 25 December 1976 (Finland and Sweden); 31 March 1977 (UK)
- Running time: 135 minutes (Europe); 151 minutes (restored version)
- Country: United Kingdom
- Language: English
- Budget: $6,000,000

The Eagle Has Landed is a 1976 British war thriller film directed by John Sturges. Based on the 1975 novel by Jack Higgins, the film is about a fictional German plot to kidnap Winston Churchill in the middle of the Second World War. It stars Michael Caine, Donald Sutherland, and Robert Duvall, and features Jenny Agutter, Donald Pleasence, Anthony Quayle, Jean Marsh, Treat Williams and Larry Hagman.

The film was produced by ITC Entertainment and distributed in the UK by Cinema International Corporation. It was Sturges' last film before his death in 1992. The Eagle Has Landed was both a critical and commercial success.

== Plot ==
Following the success of the Gran Sasso raid, German intelligence officer Max Radl is ordered to study the feasibility of capturing Winston Churchill in a similar raid. Radl learns that Churchill is due to visit the quiet Norfolk village of Studley Constable, which happens to contain a Nazi sleeper agent, Joanna Grey. He proposes that Luftwaffe colonel Kurt Steiner lead a platoon of Fallschirmjäger into the village and recruits IRA man Liam Devlin to contact Grey and make preparations for their arrival. He finds Steiner and his men in a penal unit on German-occupied Alderney, for trying to help a Jewish girl escape the SS, and convinces them to accept the mission (codenamed Operation Eagle).

Heinrich Himmler summons Radl and presents him with a letter authorising Operation Eagle, apparently signed by Adolf Hitler. The Germans fly to England in a captured Royal Air Force plane and drop into Norfolk dressed as Polish paratroopers. With the mission under way, Himmler retrieves the letter from Radl and destroys it, revealing that it was launched without Hitler's knowledge.

The inhabitants of Studley Constable initially fall for the Germans' Polish disguises, but the ruse is exposed when one of the men jumps into a mill race to save a drowning girl, causing the Nazi uniform under his clothes to become visible. The Germans lock the village down and imprison the inhabitants in the church. The priest's sister escapes, however, and alerts a nearby unit of United States Army Rangers.

Colonel Pitts, the Rangers' commander, launches a costly assault on the village that ends in his own death at the hands of Joanna Grey (who in turn is killed by Pitts's first sergeant). Junior officer Captain Clark then launches a better orchestrated assault, trapping the Germans in the church. The men sacrifice themselves to give Devlin, Steiner, and his wounded second-in-command time to slip through a hidden passage. A local girl, Molly Prior, who has fallen for the charming Devlin, helps them escape. Steiner orders his second-in-command to board a German torpedo boat anchored in a nearby creek and heads for the manor where Churchill is staying. Meanwhile, Radl is arrested on Alderney for exceeding his authority and executed by firing squad.

Steiner shoots his target dead on the terrace of the manor house and is killed immediately after. The victim is revealed to be a body double, however, the real Churchill having gone to Persia for the Tehran Conference. In the meantime, the torpedo boat runs aground before it can reach the North Sea. Only Devlin escapes death or capture, leaving a love letter for Molly before slipping away.

== Cast ==
- Michael Caine as Colonel (Oberst) Kurt Steiner
- Donald Sutherland as Liam Devlin
- Robert Duvall as Colonel (Oberst) Max Radl
- Jenny Agutter as Molly Prior
- Donald Pleasence as Heinrich Himmler
- Anthony Quayle as Admiral Wilhelm Canaris
- Jean Marsh as Joanna Grey
- Sven-Bertil Taube as Captain (Hauptmann) Hans Ritter von Neustadt
- John Standing as Philip Verecker
- Judy Geeson as Pamela Verecker
- Treat Williams as Captain Harry Clark
- Larry Hagman as Colonel Clarence E. Pitts
- Siegfried Rauch as Sergeant Major (Hauptfeldwebel) Hans Brandt
- Michael Byrne as Feldwebel Karl Hofer
- Alexei Jawdokimov as Corporal (Unteroffizier) Werner/"Kuniski"
- Richard Wren as Corporal Hans Altmann
- Maurice Roëves as Major Corcoran
- Keith Buckley as Hauptmann Peter Geriecke
- Joachim Hansen as SS-Obergruppenführer
- Terry Plummer as Arthur Seymour
- John Barrett as Laker Armsby
- David Gilliam as Sergeant Moss
- Jeff Conaway as Lieutenant Frazier
- Denis Lill as Churchill's aide

Uncredited

- Leigh Dilley as Winston Churchill
- Peter Miles as Adolf Hitler
- Kent Williams as Lieutenant Mallory
- Roy Marsden as SS-Sturmbannführer Toberg
- Wolf Kahler as SD-Hauptsturmführer Fleischer
- George Leech as Traumer
- Ferdy Mayne as Dr. Baer
- Patrick Allen as the opening narrator

== Production ==
=== Development ===
In October 1974, Paramount announced it had purchased the film rights to Jack Higgins' The Eagle Has Landed in partnership with Jack Wiener, formerly an executive at Paramount. The book came out in 1975 and was a bestseller, but the author had doubted whether anyone would be interested in making a film of the novel because its protagonists were German soldiers. He was amazed that the rights were not only sold within a fortnight, but also that the film was brought to production so swiftly.

=== Casting ===
Michael Caine was originally offered the part of Devlin, but did not want to play a member of the IRA, so asked if he could have the role of Steiner. Richard Harris was in line to play Devlin, but ongoing comments he had made in support of the IRA and attendance at an IRA fundraising event in America embroiled him in scandal and drew threats to the film's producers, so he was removed from the production and Donald Sutherland was given the role, instead.

In March 1976, The New York Times announced that David Bowie would play a German Nazi in the film if his schedule could be worked out. Jean Marsh's role was originally offered to Deborah Kerr, who turned it down.

=== Filming ===
Filming took place in 1976 over 16 weeks. Tom Mankiewicz thought the script was the best he had ever written, but felt, "John Sturges, for some reason, had given up" and did a poor job, and that editor Anne V. Coates was the one who saved the film and made it watchable.

Michael Caine had initially been excited at the prospect of working with Sturges. During shooting, Sturges told Caine that he only worked to earn enough money to go fishing. Caine wrote later in his autobiography: "The moment the picture finished, he took the money and went. [Producer] Jack Wiener later told me [Sturges] never came back for the editing nor for any of the other good post-production sessions that are where a director does some of his most important work. The picture wasn't bad, but I still get angry when I think of what it could have been with the right director. We had committed the old European sin of being impressed by someone just because he came from Hollywood."

Cornwall was used to represent the Channel Islands and Berkshire for East Anglia. The majority of the film, set in the fictional village of Studley Constable, was filmed at Mapledurham on the A4074 in Oxfordshire and features the village church, as well as Mapledurham Watermill and Mapledurham House, used for a manor house where Winston Churchill is taken. A fake water wheel was added to the 15th-century structure for the film. Mock buildings such as shops and a pub were constructed on site in Mapledurham, while interiors were filmed at Twickenham Studios. The "Landsvoort Airfield" scenes were filmed at RAF St Mawgan, 5 miles (8 km) from Newquay.

The sequence set in Alderney was filmed in Charlestown, near St Austell in Cornwall. Some of the filming took place at Rock in Cornwall. The railway station sequence where Steiner and his men make their first appearance was filmed in Rovaniemi, Finland. The parachuting scenes were carried out by members of the Royal Electrical and Mechanical Engineers parachute display team on Wednesday, 28 April 1976. The exit shots were filmed from a DC-3 at Dunkeswell Airfield in Devon. The landings onto the beach were filmed on Holkham Beach in Norfolk.

=== Post-production ===
Editor Anne Coates recalled, "I didn’t think it was a great film, but it was a good idea... That was a much better script than it was a film. It was quite a good script, actually."

Coates recalled Sturges "had a lot of problems with Donald Sutherland, who wanted his part building up, wanted his love scenes, with Jenny Agutter... built up... He kept on writing new scenes and giving them to John."

Terry Plummer's voice was dubbed by an uncredited Brian Blessed.

== Reception ==
The film was a success, with Lew Grade saying, "it made quite a lot of money". ITC made two more films with the same production team, Escape to Athena and Green Ice. The Eagle Has Landed spent a week as the number one film in the United Kingdom (9 April 1977) and was the fifteenth-most successful film of 1977.

In his review for The New York Times, Vincent Canby called the film "a good, old-fashioned, adventure movie that is so stuffed with robust incidents and characters that you can relax and enjoy it without worrying whether it actually happened or even whether it's plausible." Canby singled out the writing and directing for praise:

Tom Mankiewicz's screenplay, based on a novel by Jack Higgins, is straightforward and efficient and even intentionally funny from time to time. Mr. Sturges ... obtains first-rate performances building the tension until the film's climactic sequence, which, as you might suspect, concludes with a plot twist. ... With so many failed suspense melodramas turning up these days, it's refreshing to see one made by people who know what they're about.

When another ITC production, March or Die, faltered in US theatres during initial engagements in the fall of 1977, Columbia Pictures repackaged it into a double-feature combo with Eagle for its remaining playdates.

On Rotten Tomatoes, the film has an approval rating of 71%, based on reviews from 14 critics. Metacritic, which uses a weighted average, assigned the film a score of 61 out of 100, based on 7 critics, indicating "generally favorable" reviews.

== Home media ==
While US and UK VHS cassettes had the 123-minute US cut, most DVDs and Blu-rays available worldwide feature the original UK theatrical cut, which in DVD region 2 and 4 countries runs 130 minutes at 25 fps (PAL speed). The two exceptions are:

- The first US (NTSC) DVD, from Artisan Entertainment, had some missing scenes reinstated for a runtime of 131 minutes. It has been superseded by a Shout! Factory Blu-ray/DVD dual-format set, containing the UK theatrical cut and various extras.
- In 2004, Carlton Visual Entertainment in the UK released a two-disc Special Edition PAL DVD version, which contains various extras and two versions of the film: the UK theatrical version and a newly restored, extended 145-minute version, equivalent to 151 minutes at 24 fps (film speed). Although the packaging claims otherwise, both versions have a 2.0 stereo surround soundtrack.

The extended version contains a number of scenes that were deleted even before the European cinema release:

- Alternative opening: originally, the film was intended to start with Heinrich Himmler (Donald Pleasence) arriving at Schloss Hohenschwangau for a conference with Hitler, Canaris, Martin Bormann and Joseph Goebbels. It precedes the scenes under the opening credits, which are a long, aerial shot of a staff car leaving the castle in question. The deleted scene explains why Schloss Hohenschwangau appears in the credits but not in the film.
- In an extended scene in which Radl arrives at Abwehr headquarters, he discusses his health with a German Army doctor, played by Ferdy Mayne.
- Scene at the Berlin University where Liam Devlin is a lecturer
- Scene in Landsvoort where Steiner and von Neustadt discuss the mission, its merits, and consequences
- Extended scene of Devlin's arrival at Studley Constable in which Joanna Grey and he discuss their part in the mission
- Scene of Devlin driving his motorbike through the centre of the village and on to the cottage, where he inspects the barn before returning to the village
- Scene in which Devlin reads poetry to Molly Prior.
- Extended scene in which Molly interrupts Devlin shortly after he receives the army vehicles
- In a scene on the boat at the end of the film showing the fate of von Neustadt, the scene is also featured in the Special Edition DVD stills gallery.

== See also ==
- Cultural depictions of Winston Churchill
- Went the Day Well?, a 1942 British film about German paratroopers taking over an English village
