= Victor Wolfson =

American dramatist (1909–1990)

Victor Wolfson (8 March 1909 – May 24, 1990) was an American dramatist, director, writer, producer, and actor.

== Biography ==
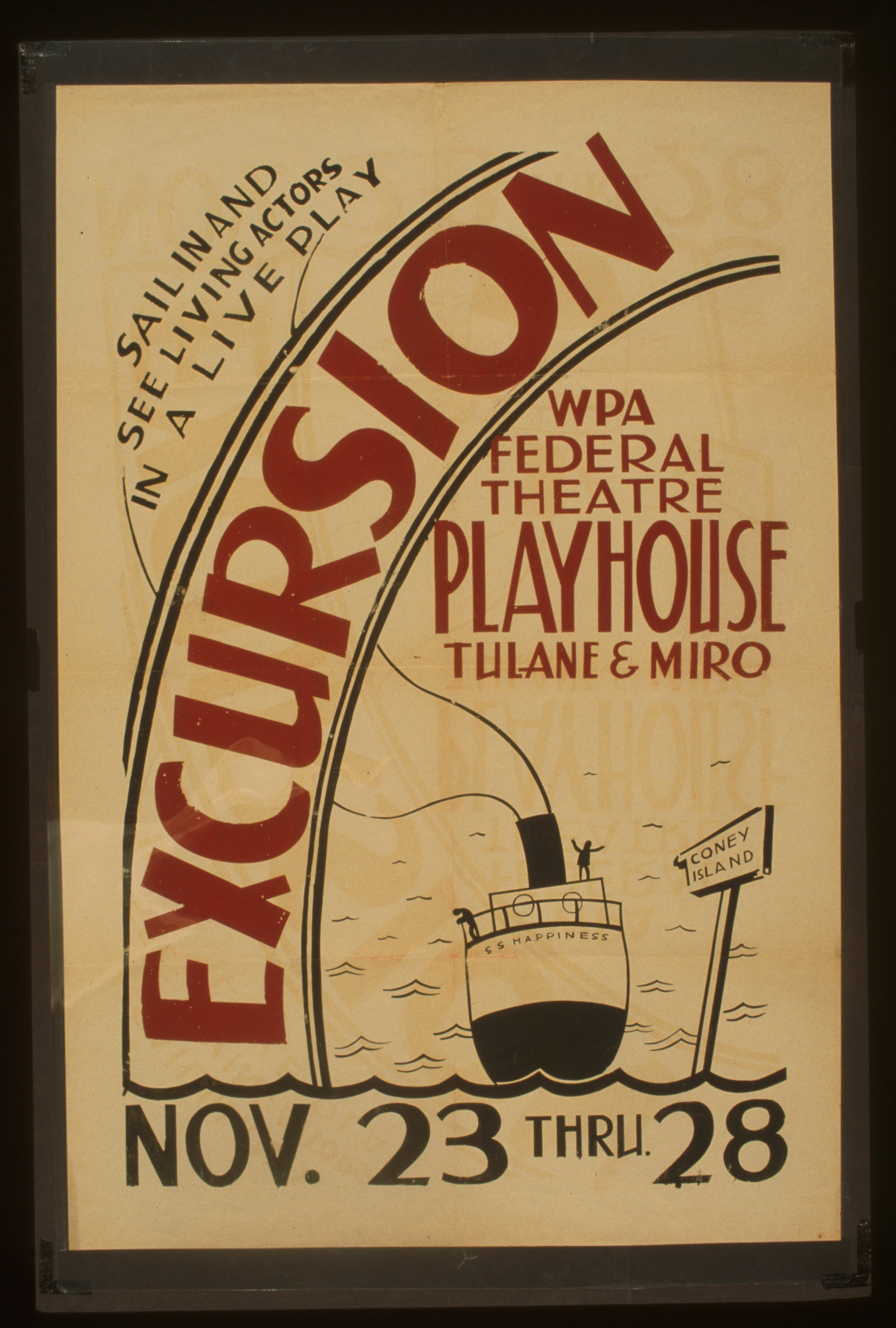
Poster for a Federal Theatre Project production of Wolfson's Broadway play Excursion in New Orleans (1937)

Victor Wolfson began his professional career organizing acting clubs for striking coal miners in West Virginia. He soon found his passion for writing, and he wrote numerous plays for Broadway, dramas for television, and many novels. He wrote professionally until his death. Wolfson attended the first class of the University of Wisconsin Experimental College, where he founded their theater group, the Experimental College Players.

His life's work was playwriting, and he adapted most of his plays from novels. His Broadway productions included the 1937 comedy Excursion, as well as Bitter Stream, adapted from Fontamara by Ignazio Silone, Pastoral, The Family, Pride's Crossing, and Seventh Heaven by Victor Young. His novels included The Lonely Steeple and The Eagle on the Plain, and he also wrote for Harper's Magazine between 1948 and 1960. In 1961, he wrote several episodes for ABC's 26-part television series Winston Churchill: The Valiant Years, which earned him an Emmy Award in 1960-1961 for Outstanding Writing Achievement in the Documentary Field. He died, aged 81, in a fire at his home in Wellfleet, Massachusetts, United States.

Wolfson's parents, Adolph Wolfson and Rebecca Hochstein Wolfson, who were Jewish, were political radicals who emigrated from Russia in 1894 to escape the pervasive antisemitism and political persecution of the Tsarist regime. His sister Theresa Wolfson was an economist and prolific writer.

== Filmography ==
- 1966 Rings Around the World (documentary) (screenplay / story)
- 1964 The Finest Hours (documentary)
- 1960 Winston Churchill: The Valiant Years (TV series documentary) (writer)
- 1956-1960 Alfred Hitchcock Presents (TV series) teleplay
- 1956 Climax! (TV series)
- 1956 Front Row Center (TV series) based on his own novel Midsummer Madness
- 1956 Kraft Theatre (TV series)
- 1954 Janet Dean, Registered Nurse (TV series)
- 1951-1952 Suspense (TV series) teleplay and writer – 8 episodes
- 1959 Invisible Man (TV series) scenario editor - 3 episodes

== Plays ==
- 1955 Seventh Heaven. Musical by Victor Young- Co-writer with Stella Unger.
- 1950 Pride's Crossing Drama - Writer
- 1943 The Family. Based on the novel by Nina Federova. - Writer.
- 1939 Pastoral Comedy - . Writer
- 1937 Excursion Comedy - Writer
- 1936 Bitter Stream - Based on the novel Fontamara by Ignazio Silone - Writer
- 1935 Mother - Stage Director
- 1935 Crime and Punishment - Drama. Writer, Producer and Stage Director.
- 1932 Counsellor-At-Law. Revival -Performed as 'A Tall Man'. Counsellor at Law was made into a film in 1933.
- 1931 Counsellor-at-Law. Drama. Directed by William Wyler. - Performed as 'A Tall Man'
- 1926 Mixed Bill -Writer

== Books ==
- 1969 The Mayerling Murder, a book about the Mayerling Incident.
- 1967 Midsummer Madness
- 1966 The Man who Cared: A Life of Harry S. Truman
- 1962 My Prince! My King!
- 1947 The Eagle on the Plain
- 1945 The Lonely Steeple
- 1937 Excursion: A play in three acts
