= Flight of Eagles =

1998 novel

- First edition
- Author: Jack Higgins
- Language: English
- Genre: Historical, Thriller, Novel
- Publisher: G.P. Putnam's Sons
- Publication date: 2 July 1998
- Publication place: United States
- Media type: Print (Hardcover and Paperback)
- Pages: 352 pp (hardcover edition); 352 pp (paperback edition)
- ISBN: 0-7181-4297-7 (hardcover edition); ISBN 0-14-027027-2 (paperback edition)
- OCLC: 40257628

Flight of Eagles is a novel by Jack Higgins, set in World War II.

== Plot summary ==
Jack Kelso, an American ace pilot in World War I, is shot down and nursed back to health by a German nurse, Baroness Elsa von Halder. They marry and return to America after the war. After Jack is killed in a car accident, Elsa returns to Germany with their eldest son Max, who assumes the title of Baron von Halder. Harry, his identical younger (by ten minutes) brother, remains with his grandfather, millionaire Abe Kelso.

Inspired by their father's example, both brothers become ace and much decorated pilots in opposing forces. Max joins the Luftwaffe and Harry, after fighting in Finland, returns to England, joining the Royal Air Force as a 'Finn'.

The brothers rise in rank and number of 'kills', occasionally hearing of the others exploits. They actually meet again in the skies and, when Harry is shot down, Max summons an English rescue boat using his airborne radio.

Elsa continues her social climbing amongst the Nazi elite, although Max warns her of the potential danger. Harry becomes a special duties pilot and crashes in France whilst landing a French Resistance leader. He is captured by the Germans and imprisoned at a local chateau, where he and Max finally meet face to face.

Heinrich Himmler, learning of the capture of one ace, arranges for the brothers to be blackmailed. Max is to assume Harry's character, 'escape' to England and assassinate General Dwight D. Eisenhower. Fearing for his Mother's life, Max is forced to agree and flies back home. Elsa tries to intervene, but is shot dead in the attempt. The brothers' plot fails, mainly because the brothers see themselves as flyers and honourable men, not assassins.

Max returns to France, rescues Harry and flies back to England, but Max is killed when they are intercepted by a Bf 109. Harry returns to flying and is killed in a later mission, late in the war.

The narrative is surrounded by a 'frame story', with a prologue and epilogue. In 1998, the author and his wife, an experienced pilot, are forced to ditch their airplane in the English Channel and are rescued by the Cold Harbour lifeboat. They learn something of what happened in Cold Harbour during the War and later meet other surviving characters.

A central character of the story is 'Tarquin', a bear wearing flying kit with both RAF and RFC insignia. He was Jack's lucky mascot, later Harry's and was lost when Harry crashed. Tarquin passed to a French family and was later bought in an English antiques shop by the author's wife, also as a flying mascot.

There are a few twist reveals in the final chapter of the story, having to do with the fate of some of the earlier characters. Also when the twins are split after their father dies, they argue over who will take possession of Tarquin, they agree the bear stays in America, Max the oldest wins the toss and stays with his grandfather as "Harry" sending Harry to Germany as "Max"...so when Himmler forces Max to become Harry, they are actually switching back to their original selves.

The book is supposedly based on a true story.
