= Cold Harbour (novel) =

1990 book by Jack Higgins

- Author: Jack Higgins
- Language: English
- Series: & Jack Carter
- Genre: War, Thriller Novel
- Publisher: G.P. Putnam's Sons
- Publication date: 1990
- Publication place: United States
- Media type: Print (hardback & paperback)
- Pages: 304 pp
- ISBN: 0425193209

Cold Harbour is a book by British writer Jack Higgins, set during World War II and first published in 1990.

== Plot summary ==
In May 1944 Brigadier Dougal Munro of the SOE sends beautiful British operative Genevieve Trevaunce to France, with the task of infiltrating General Erwin Rommel's briefing on the defence of the Atlantic Wall. The mission is compromised and it is up to OSS Major Craig Osbourne, a highly trained assassin and Special Forces officer, to rescue her.

== Release details ==
- 1990, USA, G.P. Putnam's Sons, New York, ISBN 0425193209

== Reception ==
Reviews were mixed. Publishers Weekly called it "an improbable story", with "cardboard" characters and "nothing very new to offer", ultimately judging that Higgins' "reputation for entertaining thrillers [would] not be enhanced" by it. Kirkus Reviews similarly found its premise to be "(v)ery familiar", but with "twists and hurtling suspense enough to forgive its pure pulp roots."
