= Night of the Fox (novel) =

1986 novel by Jack Higgins

- First edition
- Author: Jack Higgins
- Language: English
- Genre: War, Thriller Novel
- Publisher: William Collins, Sons
- Publication date: 1986
- Publication place: United Kingdom
- Media type: Print (hardback and paperback)

Night of the Fox is a World War II spy thriller novel by Jack Higgins, first published in 1986. It was published by Collins in the United Kingdom and Simon & Schuster in the United States. It was adapted into the 1990 television film Night of the Fox, starring George Peppard as Martineau and Michael York as Erwin Rommel.

== Plot summary ==
Alan Stacy, a professor from Harvard University, visits Jersey to complete his biography of his friend and pre-World War II fellow academic Harry Martineau. The work has lain unfinished since 1939. He has been unable to obtain any information on Harry's wartime activities, but he knows that Harry worked for the British Government in some very secret capacities. Harry is now dead and his body has been released to a Dr. Drayton.

Stacy arrives on the day of Harry's funeral, but only one mourner is present, Dr. Sarah Drayton. Invited back to her house, he is told by Sarah that the two of them worked for Special Operations Executive (SOE) during the war. She shows Stacy a photo of them posing with Field Marshal Erwin Rommel, and then tells the story behind the photo.

In the aftermath of the Slapton Sands disaster, Hugh Kelso, a US Army colonel and engineering officer, is badly wounded but manages to climb into a life-raft. He is washed ashore on Jersey, and rescued by Hélène de Ville, wife of the Seigneur of Jersey, and Sean Gallagher, a former General in the Irish Army, who has retired in Jersey. They manage to establish communications, via a French resistance contact, with SOE, reporting that Kelso is alive, although badly injured and under medical care.

Brigadier Dougal Munro of SOE is aware that Kelso is a 'bigot', one of the few officers who knows the full details of the planned D-Day landings. After consultation with General Dwight D. Eisenhower, he decides that Kelso must either be rescued – or eliminated – to stop him from talking, should he be captured and interrogated.

Munro recruits Harry Martineau, a former Professor of Moral Philosophy at Oxford, and now a covert operative and ruthless killer. Harry is recovering from an assignment in France in which he was shot and severely injured. As his assistant and 'cover', they also recruit Sarah Drayton, a young nurse with connections in, and local knowledge of, Jersey. Harry assumes the identity of SD Standartenführer Max Vogel. He is supplied with a forged letter of authority signed by Hitler and Himmler, giving him unlimited and unquestioned authority. Sarah's cover is that of Anne-Marie de la Tour, his French 'mistress'. She undertakes very brief training in the use of small arms under Sergeant Kelly, and a complete makeover by Mrs Moon, an expert make-up artist borrowed from Denham Film Studios.

The two are flown to occupied France by a Westland Lysander aeroplane and Harry uses his authority to demand transport on a regular convoy from the port of Granville to occupied Jersey. Harry sails on a naval vessel, but Sarah, as a civilian, must travel on a cargo boat. On board, she meets Lt. Guido Orsini, an Italian gunnery officer. The flotilla is attacked by Allied Motor Torpedo Boats and the boat on which Sarah is sailing is sunk by torpedoes. She is rescued by Orsini and they finally arrive in Jersey.

Sarah's civilian documents and status – and the Walther PPK pistol she carries – arouse some suspicion with Captain Muller, the local head of the Geheime Feldpolizei, but Harry's impeccable authority leaves the Germans scrambling to assist him in any way he wishes, providing him accommodation and a personal vehicle, a Kubelwagen. Nevertheless, the Chief of Police, seconded from the Gestapo, decides to find out more about Vogel.

On a tour of the island, Vogel finds Inspector Willi Kleist, Muller's deputy, trying to rape a young local girl, and after a fight, Kleist is badly injured by Gallagher. The former swears revenge on Vogel.

The plan to evacuate the wounded Kelso is upset by the arrival of Field Marshal Erwin Rommel on a surprise tour of inspection. But no-one of the party, and only one of the German officers, Major Hofer, is aware that 'Rommel' is actually Corporal Erich Berger, a cabaret performer and actor who is Rommel's double. The real Rommel has been drawn into a plot to assassinate Hitler and needs to be temporarily away from Germany, meeting with several generals in Normandy to formulate their plan. Berger is to serve as his alibi, with Hofer as his 'aide'.

A small aircraft is sitting at the airfield for the weekly mail flight, but the flight cannot be commandeered except by special authority. Harry, who has planned to assassinate Rommel, unmasks him as Berger and gets him to give that authority. Berger agrees to co-operate, and reveals that he is actually Heini Baum, a German Jew who has assumed the identity of the dead Berger and has survived as a soldier, even winning the Iron Cross while serving with the Afrika Korps.

The operation is nearly upset by the arrival of a drunken Kleist, who has overheard them speaking English and now knows the real identities of both Vogel and Berger. He holds them at gunpoint, but is overpowered and killed by Gallagher. They place him in a car which is set on fire and pushed over a cliff. Sarah, Harry and Baum commandeer the plane and fly towards France. The crew are overpowered and ordered to fly to England.

The escape plan is discovered, and Muller has learned that no-one in Berlin has ever heard of 'Vogel'. A Luftwaffe night fighter is scrambled to shoot them down. One of the crew is killed and the pilot, a Finn who has thrown in his lot with the escapees, drops to almost sea-level, drawing down the pursuing fighter, which crashes. They continue to England, now in radio contact with the RAF.

On landing, they are surrounded by armed soldiers. Baum rushes excitedly forward and is shot by a guard, ostensibly by accident but actually on Munro's orders. As he dies, he begs Harry to say Kaddish for him.

The action returns to the present, and Sarah reveals that after the war, she qualified as a medical doctor and worked in the Cromwell Hospital, where she'd been nursing when she was recruited. She later married Orsini and lived on the family estate outside Florence, operating a country practice as Contessa Orsini. When Guido died as a result of a motor race accident, she returned to Jersey, despite the desire of her son, the present Count, to stay in Italy.

She tells Stacy that Harry continued to work for SOE, but was shot down by friendly fire a few months later. His body, buried in the Essex marshes, was not found until recently and he has now received a much belated burial.
