= Angel of Death (novel) =

Novel by Jack Higgins

- First edition (publ. Michael Joseph)
- Author: Jack Higgins
- Language: English
- Genre: Thriller
- Published: 1995
- Media type: Print (Hardcover)
- Pages: 311 (First edition)
- ISBN: 9780399140426

Angel of Death is a thriller novel by Jack Higgins written in 1995. It tells the story of a famous actress who joins a bloody terrorist movement named after Bloody Sunday's date, 30 January. This terrorist group appear to target random government agencies and terrorists group from members of the Central Intelligence Agency, to the KGB and the Provisional Irish Republican Army, putting the Northern Ireland peace process at stake. The novel features Higgins' recurring character Sean Dillon.

== Plot ==
Former IRA enforcer Sean Dillon, together with Hannah Bernstein, seeks to catch the Protestant terrorist Daniel Quinn. Quinn's men know who he is and he almost gets killed, but he is saved by a mysterious woman on a motorcycle. The woman is Grace Browning, an actress turned assassin and a member of a terrorist group known as January 30. Other members of January 30 are Tom Curry, an academic who's working for the Russian government, and his friend Rupert Lang, a Member of Parliament.

Dillon and Bernstein's search for Quinn takes them to Beirut. Dillon is captured by an Israeli soldier, Anya, and her brothers, who want Dillion to interrogate one of Quinn's men. The interrogation leads them to a ship. Dillon blows up the ship, killing Quinn in the process, leaving the Sons of Ulster requiring a new leader.

Dillion and Bernstein return to Ireland, where they get the job of protecting Senator Patrick Keogh. Ferguson figures out that Rupert is a traitor. Ferguson and the Prime Minister confront him but he escapes. Dillon follows him to the south of England where Rupert is mortally wounded.

After Tom learns of Rupert's death he kills himself in London by throwing himself in front of a train. Sean and Hannah confront Grace at a theatre. Grace draws a gun and Hannah shoots her dead. Hannah is upset when she discovers that Grace’s gun wasn't loaded. January 30 is finished.
