= Alice Jane Gray Perkins =

American writer and teacher

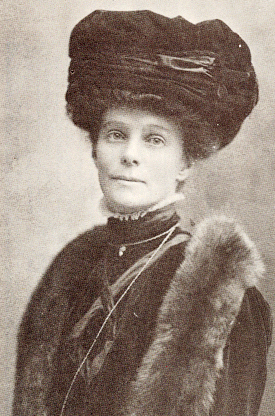
- in 1898
- Born: 28 August 1865; Schenectady
- Died: 14 February 1948 (aged 82); New York
- Occupations: teacher and writer
- Writing career
- Pen name: Jane Gray Perkins

Alice Jane Gray Perkins or Jane Gray Perkins (28 August 1865 – 14 February 1948) was an American writer and teacher. She was known as a suffragist in the UK as well as in America.

== Life ==
Perkins was born in Schenectady in 1865 to Anne Dunbar Potts Perkins. Her father Maurice Perkins was the Professor of Chemistry at Union College from 1865, so she was brought up on the college campus. Her mother is remembered for her letters which record the college's history. Alice was one of three children. She traveled to Europe, but she started her interest in education at her home town by opening a school in 1895 for children. The school was short lived as she went to study further at Barnard College to increase her expertise in science and maths. Her family's funding resulted in a master's degree for Perkins in 1899.

Alice continued to live in New York where she taught history at the Nightingale-Bamford School. In 1907 she published The Life of the Honourable Mrs. Norton using the name "Jane Grey Perkins".

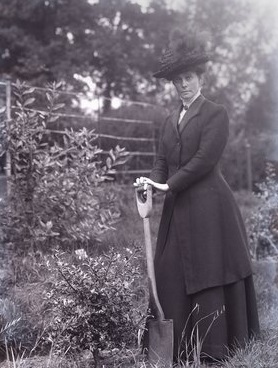
Alice Perkins planting at Eagle House in 1910

Eagle House near Bath in Somerset had become an important refuge for suffragettes who had been released from prison after hunger strikes. Mary Blathwayt's parents planted trees there between April 1909 and July 1911 to commemorate the achievements of suffragettes including Emmeline Pankhurst, Christabel Pankhurst, Annie Kenney, Charlotte Despard, Millicent Fawcett and Lady Lytton. The trees were known as "Annie's Arboreatum" after Annie Kenney. There was also a "Pankhurst Pond" within the grounds.

Perkins was invited to Eagle House in 1910 and she recorded her visit by planting a Christmas Holly bush. A plaque was made and her photograph was recorded by Colonel Linley Blathwayt on 12 September wearing a brooch of the Women's Social and Political Union.

Perkins co-wrote "Frances Wright: Free Enquirer" with Theresa Wolfson who was prominent in the American workers education movement. Their book was published in 1939. Perkins died in New York in 1948.

== Works ==
- The Life of the Honourable Mrs. Norton, 1907
- Frances Wright: Free Enquirer, 1939 (co-authored with Theresa Wolfson)
