= The Graveyard Shift (novel) =

1965 novel by Jack Higgins

- First edition cover
- Author: Harry Patterson
- Publisher: John Long Ltd
- Publication date: 1965

The Graveyard Shift is a 1965 novel by Harry Patterson, also known as Jack Higgins.

The novel tells the story of Nick Miller, a newly recruited police officer who lives with his rich brother but who will not take part in his brother's business. Miller is on the trail of Ben Garvald, a man who has just been released from prison after completing a nine-year sentence there. But Ben's ex-wife's sister, Jean Fleming still thinks that Ben is dangerous and look out for revenge against her sister as she has married mobster Harry Faulkner. Jean also has a note from Ben to her sister when he was in prison telling her that he is coming back. This results in Nick hunting for Ben from scratch through his friends.

Miller is hated by constable Brady who has been a policeman for 25 years, where Miller was promoted based on a year-long course. Because of this, Brady goes looking for Ben Garvald, and in the process is knocked down a flight of stairs. This is later staged to look like an automobile accident.
