= Wrath of the Lion =

- First edition (publ. John Long Ltd)
- Author: Jack Higgins
- Language: English
- Publication date: 1964

Wrath of the Lion is a 1964 thriller novel by Jack Higgins. Like the more famous The Day of the Jackal by Frederick Forsyth, the background to Higgins' book is the last ditch effort by the OAS, a French dissident paramilitary organisation, to take revenge on Charles de Gaulle, the President of France, for his having granted independence to Algeria and ended French rule there.

== Plot summary ==
The OAS has managed to suborn the crew of a French Navy submarine, the L'Alouette. From a secret hideout in the British-ruled Channel Islands, an aristocratic OAS commander, Philippe de Beumont, sends the submarine to missions of revenge against French shipping. British Intelligence and the French Deuxième Bureau team up, each sending an agent to locate the rogue submarine and terminate its activities. After many adventures and perils the two agents, French and British, accomplish their mission to the full - in the process both also finding enduring love with, respectively, the daughter and the widowed daughter-in-law of a retired British general living in the Channel Islands.

== Themes ==
Reviewer Naomi Wineman wrote: " Wrath of the Lion is noteworthy for the fact of virtually all its cast of male characters (heroes and villains alike, and it is not always easy to determine which is which) being professional soldiers, very deeply scarred, traumatized and embittered by the wars of the middle 20th Century (Second World War, Korean War, the French wars in Indo-China and Algeria, the British Malayan Emergency). The memories both of the horrors which they endured as prisoners of very inhumane captors and the horrors which they inflicted as utterly ruthless and determined fighters come up again and again, and substantially affect the plot in the book's present.

In particular, the book's main protagonist Neil Mallory is specifically mentioned as having the nickname "The Butcher of Perak". A long flashback to 1954 Malaya, including graphic descriptions of the systematic torture and extrajudicial execution of prisoners, show him to have amply earned this nickname, yet knowing his past does not prevent the warm-hearted Anne Grant from falling very deeply in love with him.

Given the book's great emphasis on the characters' tortured and traumatized psyche, the final scene seems a bit forced, with both victorious agents being embraced and kissed by their respective sweethearts and the reader promised a future of 'they lived happily ever after'."
