= The Eagle Has Flown =

1991 novel by Jack Higgins

- First edition
- Author: Jack Higgins
- Language: English
- Genre: War, Thriller Novel
- Publisher: Chapmans
- Publication date: 1991
- Publication place: United Kingdom
- Media type: Print (Hardback and Paperback)
- Pages: 352 (hardcover edition); 356 (paperback edition)
- ISBN: 1-85592-012-3 (hardcover edition)
- OCLC: 60076919

The Eagle Has Flown is a book by Jack Higgins, first published in 1991. It is a sequel to The Eagle Has Landed.

== Plot summary ==
Following the events in the previous novel, it is revealed that Kurt Steiner did not die after attempting to kill the fake Churchill, but was only wounded. German intelligence learns that, after recovery in a Norfolk RAF hospital, he was briefly imprisoned in the Tower of London.

Brigadier Dougal Munro and Captain Jack Carter (recurring characters in several novels by Higgins) of the Special Operations Executive, arrange for Steiner to be relocated to a 'safe house' in a St Mary's Priory in Wapping, where he can be held whilst recuperating from surgery. Munro makes sure, via double agents at the Spanish embassies in London and Berlin, that German intelligence find out about Steiner's survival. They hope to catch the German agents attempting a rescue, especially IRA gunman Liam Devlin, in their net.

Learning of Steiner's survival, Reichsführer-SS Heinrich Himmler summons SS General Walter Schellenberg, the chief of intelligence of the Ausland-SD to a gothic castle. Giving Schellenberg the same authority he'd given Max Radl, Himmler orders him to launch an operation to rescue Steiner. Himmler hopes to present Steiner to Hitler as a propaganda coup for the SS that will greatly embarrass Abwehr chief Wilhelm Canaris, who had originally opposed Steiner's operation. Schellenberg manages to track down Liam Devlin, who is working in a bar in Lisbon whilst trying to earn enough money for passage to the United States. When Schellenberg offers him £25,000, £5,000 more than he received for the first mission, Devlin agrees to participate.

Devlin parachutes into Ireland before entering England via a ferry to Scotland in the guise of an army chaplain. Whilst Schellenberg recruits Asa Vaughan, a pilot in the fictional American Free Corps, to pilot Steiner's escape flight. Schellenberg then enlists the help of two fascists and 'sleeper agents', Sir Max Shaw and his sister Lavinia. Their home, Shaw Place, an isolated country house located near Romney Marsh, Kent is seen by Schellenberg as an ideal landing field for Vaughan.

In London and now under the guise of Father Harry Conlon, an army chaplain, Devlin seeks sanctuary at the home of an Irish republican and old friend Michael Ryan. Ryan is living near the priory along with his niece, Mary, who takes an instant shine to Devlin. In need of an army radio, Devlin and Ryan make the mistake of buying the communications equipment from the Carver brothers, vicious London gangsters and black marketeers. Using his disguise, Devlin manages to gain entry to the priory where he takes the confession of the prisoner and the staff.

The rescue of Steiner from the priory, meticulously planned, is successful, although they are forced to take Munro along as a hostage. They drive to Shaw Place, but as Vaughan is making his landing in thick fog, a shootout ensues in which both Carvers and the Shaws are killed. Leaving Munro behind, Vaughan flies Devlin and Steiner to occupied France and make a dangerous landing near the headquarters of Erich Kraemer's detachment, also badly fog-bound.

About to present Steiner to Himmler and Hitler at a chateau on the French coast, Schellenberg learns that Himmler is plotting to stage a coup and to assassinate Hitler, Erwin Rommel and Canaris. Deciding that the war will end quicker with Hitler in charge than under Himmler who intends to be his successor, he and Steiner commandeer Kraemer's paratroopers and foil the plot.

Himmler makes it clear that the incident must not become public knowledge – in effect, it 'never happened'. Schellenberg opts to remain in Germany, and allows Steiner, Vaughan and Devlin to 'escape'. They fly to Ireland, landing in County Mayo and sinking their airplane. Their subsequent fate is not revealed, although it seems that both Devlin and Steiner are alive in 1975.

As in several of the novels by Higgins, the plot is surrounded with a prologue and epilogue. In 1975, the author, Higgins, meets an American historian in London, who gives him a photocopy of an illegally obtained secret dossier, with a one hundred-year hold, from the Public Record Office. The document purports to tell the story of Steiner's rescue. Shortly afterwards, the historian is killed in a suspicious road accident, which is investigated by a senior police officer – possibly from Special Branch. Higgins contacts Devlin, still living in Belfast, and obtains most, but not all, of the story to corroborate the contents of the dossier.

== Fictional characters ==
- Liam Devlin – notorious IRA gunman who reluctantly works for the Nazis.
- Col. Kurt Steiner – highly decorated Fallschirmjager officer who survived the events that occurred at Studley Constable.
- Maj. Horst Berger – a thuggish Gestapo officer who has survived terrible burns to the side of his face.
- Brig. Dougal Munro – Head of Section D of the SOE, who was assigned to hush up events at Studley Constable.
- Capt. Jack Carter – Munro's trusted deputy, who'd lost a leg at Dunkirk.
- Asa Vaughan – an American pilot who fought with the Finnish Army against the Soviets during the Winter War, before joining the SS.
- Michael Ryan – an Irish Republican and long-time friend of Devlin, who lives close to where Munro is holding Steiner.
- Mary Ryan – Michael's disabled niece.
- Hauptmann Erich Kraemer – a Fallschirmjager officer whose unit is enlisted by Steiner to thwart Himmler's assassination attempt on Hitler.
