= Theresa Wolfson =

American economist

- Born: July 19th, 1897; Brooklyn, New York, USA
- Died: May 14th, 1972 (aged 74); Brooklyn, New York, USA
- Education: Adelphi College, Columbia University
- Scientific career
- Workplaces: International Ladies' Garment Workers' Union, Brooklyn College
- Thesis: "The Woman Worker and the Trade Unions" (1926)

Theresa Wolfson (July 19, 1897 – May 14, 1972) was an American labor economist and educator. Wolfson is best remembered as the education director of the International Ladies' Garment Workers' Union during the second half of the 1920s and as a leader of the workers education movement during the 1930s.

== Biography ==
=== Early years ===
Theresa Wolfson was born July 19, 1897, in Brooklyn, New York. Wolfson's parents, Adolph Wolfson and Rebecca Hochstein Wolfson, were ethnic Jewish radicals who emigrated from Russia in 1894 to escape the pervasive antisemitism and political persecution of the Tsarist regime.

During her elementary school years Wolfson attended public school in Brooklyn before attending high school at Far Rockaway, Long Island.

Wolfson attended Adelphi College in Garden City, New York, where she helped to organize a campus chapter of the Intercollegiate Socialist Society in 1916. Following her graduation in 1917, Wolfson worked as a volunteer health worker at a settlement house in New York City.

=== Career ===
In 1918 Wolfson became a field investigator for the National Child Labor Committee, remaining at that job until 1920. In this capacity Wolfson was the author of several reports on child labor in the textile industry of North Carolina.

From 1920 to 1922, Wolfson served as executive director of the New York Consumers' League, heading its political efforts on behalf of the 8-hour day and minimum wage legislation.

During this time Wolfson also attended graduate courses, receiving a Master's degree in economics in 1922 from Columbia University and completing her PhD from the Brookings Institution in 1926. She also taught briefly as an instructor at Barnard College in this interval.

Following completion of her academic work, Wolfson went to work for the International Ladies' Garment Workers' Union as the education director of its Union Health Center. She also became involved in the workers' education movement by teaching at the Bryn Mawr Summer School for Women Workers in Industry and by lecturing at Brookwood Labor College, headed by A.J. Muste.

She published her dissertation "The Woman Worker and the Trade Unions" in 1926.

In 1928 Wolfson accepted a post at Brooklyn College (at the time a branch of Hunter College), where she remained as a professor of economics and labor relations until her retirement in 1967. Wolfson also remained active in workers' education as a teacher during summer schools conducted by the American Labor Education Service. For this activity Wolfson was recognized in 1957 with the John Dewey Award of the League for Industrial Democracy.

Wolfson's work in the field of labor relations focused on the education and advancement of women in the workplace, and the unequal treatment of women within trade unions.

=== Personal life ===
Wolfson married Dr. Iago Galdston, a psychiatrist, in 1920. The couple had two children before divorcing in 1935. In 1938 Wolfson married Austin Bigelow Wood, a psychology instructor on the staff with her at Brooklyn College.

Her brother Victor Wolfson was a notable playwright and novelist.

=== Death and legacy ===
Theresa Wolfson died on May 14, 1972, at the age of 74. A scholarship in her name allows a Brooklyn College student to pursue graduate studies in labor economics each year.

Wolfson's papers are held at Cornell University in Ithaca, New York at the school's Catherwood Library.

== Works ==
- People Who Go to Beets. New York City : National Child Labor Committee, 1920.
- The Woman Worker and the Trade Unions. New York: International Publishers, 1926.
- The Women's Auxiliary to Trade Unions, and Workers' Education. New York: Workers' Education Bureau of America, 1926.
- Labor and the NRA. 1934.
- Industrial Unionism in the American Labor Movement. With Abraham Weiss. New York: League for Industrial Democracy, 1937
- Frances Wright, Free Enquirer: The Study of a Temperament. (co-authored with Alice Jane Gray Perkins)
- The Forward March of American Labor: A Brief History of the American Labor Movement Written for Union Members. With Joe Glazer. New York: League for Industrial Democracy, 1945.
- Labor's Coming of Age. New York: New York Society for Ethical Culture, 1946.
- Overcoming Prejudice: The Role of the Conference in Stimulating Democratic Attitudes. New York: American Labor Education Service, 1946.
- A Decade of Industrial Relations Research, 1946-1956. With Neil W. Chamberlain and Frank C. Pierson. New York: Harper and Brothers, 1958.
- Harry W. Laidler: A Checklist of his Writings in the Tamiment Library: With a Biographical Sketch. New York: New York University Libraries, 1968.
