= The Gathering Storm (1974 film) =

- Genre: Biography; Drama
- Based on: The Gathering Storm by Winston Churchill
- Screenplay by: Colin Morris
- Directed by: Herbert Wise
- Starring: Richard Burton; Virginia McKenna; Robert Hardy; Ian Bannen; Lesley Dunlop
- Countries of origin: United Kingdom; United States
- Original language: English

Production
- Executive producer: Duane Bogie
- Producers: Jack Levin; Andrew Osborn
- Running time: 75 minutes
- Production companies: NBC; BBC; Hallmark Hall of Fame

Original release
- Network: NBC
- Release: November 29, 1974

The Gathering Storm is a 1974 British/American television biopic film, about Winston Churchill's life in the years just prior to, and at the start of, World War II, from 1936 to 1940.

It was a joint production of the BBC and NBC, made in 1974 in the Hallmark Hall of Fame; it starred Richard Burton as Churchill and Virginia McKenna as Clementine Churchill. Robin Bailey portrays Neville Chamberlain. The supporting cast includes Ian Bannen as Adolf Hitler, Ian Ogilvy as King Edward VIII, Thorley Walters as Stanley Baldwin and Patrick Stewart as Clement Attlee, Robert Hardy as Joachim von Ribbentrop, and Clive Francis as Randolph Churchill.

The film has the same title as the first volume of Churchill's largely autobiographical six-volume history of the war. This volume covers the period from 1919 to 10 May 1940, the day he became prime minister.

The film was broadcast in the UK as Walk with Destiny. Although another film about Churchill, made in 2002, was also called The Gathering Storm, it bears little resemblance to the 1974 film. Robert Hardy who played Joachim von Ribbentrop would go on to play Churchill in an eight-part TV series in 1981, The Wilderness Years, which covered the same period in Churchill's life as The Gathering Storm as well as in several other productions.

== See also ==
- The Gathering Storm - 2002 film starring Albert Finney
- Into the Storm – 2009 sequel starring Brendan Gleeson
- Darkest Hour – 2017 film starring Gary Oldman
