= Jack Higgins =

British novelist (1929–2022)

- Higgins in 1983
- Born: Henry Patterson; 27 July 1929; Newcastle upon Tyne, England
- Died: 9 April 2022 (aged 92); Jersey, Channel Islands
- Education: London School of Economics
- Occupation: Novelist
- Spouses: Amy Hewitt (m. 1958–1984); Denise Palmer (m. 1985)
- Children: 4
- Writing career
- Period: 1959–2017
- Genres: Thriller, espionage, mystery
- Notable works: The Eagle Has Landed; A Prayer for the Dying; The Eagle Has Flown; Thunder Point; Angel of Death; Flight of Eagles; Day of Reckoning

Henry Patterson (27 July 1929 – 9 April 2022), commonly known by his pen name Jack Higgins, was a British author. He was a best-selling author of popular thrillers and espionage novels. His novel The Eagle Has Landed (1975) sold more than 50 million copies and was adapted into a successful 1976 movie of the same title.

Some of his other notable books are A Prayer for the Dying (1973), The Eagle Has Flown (1991), Thunder Point (1993), Angel of Death (1995), Flight of Eagles (1998), and Day of Reckoning (2000). His 85 novels in total have sold more than 250 million copies and have been translated into 55 languages.

== Early life ==
Jack Higgins was born Henry Patterson on 27 July 1929 in Newcastle upon Tyne to an English father and a Northern Irish mother. When his father abandoned them soon afterward, his mother returned with him to her home town of Belfast, Northern Ireland, to live with her mother and her grandfather on the Shankill Road. Raised amid the religious and political violence of Belfast, Patterson learned to read at the age of three, when he was tasked with reading The Christian Herald to his bed-ridden grandfather. At night, he would crouch beneath a window and read by the light of street lamps.

I read Oliver Twist when I was six. Not because it was a classic, but because it was a book that was available. I probably didn't understand everything in it—for years I used to pronounce the word rogue as rogger—but I didn't care. I just loved reading.

When his mother remarried, the family relocated to Leeds, West Yorkshire, England, where Patterson won a scholarship to attend Roundhay Grammar School for Boys. He proved to be an indifferent student and left school with few formal qualifications. In 1947 he began two years of national service, at first with the East Yorkshire Regiment, and later as a non-commissioned officer of the Royal Horse Guards Regiment of the Household Cavalry doing security work on the East German border.

After leaving the army, he returned to education at Beckett Park teacher training college in Leeds and studied for a BSc sociology degree as a London School of Economics external student, taking his finals in Bradford in 1961. By day, he was working as a driver and labourer at night. He chose the university for its "history of nonconformism". He received his third-class degree after three years of study. After getting a teaching qualification, he started teaching at Allerton Grange Comprehensive School. He accepted a job lecturing in social psychology and criminology. He taught liberal studies at Leeds Polytechnic and education at James Graham College, which became part of Leeds Polytechnic in 1976.

== Career ==
In 1959, Higgins began writing novels. One of his aliases was James Graham. The growing success of his early work allowed him to take time off from his teaching, which he quit eventually to become a full-time novelist.

Patterson's early novels, using his own name (as "Harry Patterson") as well as the pseudonyms James Graham, Martin Fallon, and Hugh Marlowe, are thrillers that typically feature hardened, cynical heroes, ruthless villains, and dangerous locales. Patterson published thirty-five such novels (sometimes three or four a year) between 1959 and 1974, learning his craft. East Of Desolation (1968), A Game For Heroes (1970) and The Savage Day (1972) are notable among his early work for their vividly described settings (Greenland, the Channel Islands, and Belfast, respectively) and offbeat plots.

Patterson began using the pseudonym Jack Higgins during the late 1960s; his first minor bestsellers were published during the early 1970s, two contemporary thrillers The Savage Day and A Prayer for the Dying, but it was the publication of his thirty-sixth book, The Eagle Has Landed, in 1975, that made Higgins' reputation. Its plot concerns a German commando unit sent into England to kidnap Winston Churchill. The main character is arguably an Irish gunman and poet, Liam Devlin. Higgins followed The Eagle Has Landed with a series of thrillers, including several (Touch The Devil, Confessional, The Eagle Has Flown) featuring the character Devlin.

The third phase of Patterson's career began with the publication of Eye of the Storm in 1992, a fictionalised retelling of an unsuccessful mortar attack on Prime Minister John Major, by a ruthless young Irish gunman-philosopher named Sean Dillon, hired by an Iraqi millionaire. Cast as the main character for the next series of novels (22 out of 43 published between 1992 and 2017), it is apparent that Dillon is in many ways an amalgamation of Patterson's previous heroes—Chavasse with his flair for languages, Nick Miller's familiarity with martial arts and jazz keyboard skills, Simon Vaughan's Irish roots, facility with firearms and the cynicism that comes with assuming the responsibility of administering a justice unavailable through a civilised legal system.

== Personal life and death ==
Higgins met Amy Hewitt while both were studying at the London School of Economics. They were married in 1958, soon after he received a £75 advance for his first novel—"the biggest wedding present we could have had." They had four children: Sarah (born 1960), Ruth (born 1962), Sean (born 1965), and Hannah (born 1974). Their daughter Sarah Patterson authored the novel The Distant Summer (1976). The marriage ended in 1984. In 1985, he married his second wife, Denise Palmer, who was a contemporary of Theresa May at St Hugh's College, Oxford.

Higgins died at his home in Jersey, on 9 April 2022, at the age of 92.

== Additional information ==
At Leeds Trinity University (formerly Leeds Trinity and All Saints College), there is the Jack Higgins Prize for Outstanding Academic Achievement. This is awarded annually to select students within the English Faculty who have demonstrated academic excellence.

== Bibliography ==
N°	Year	Title	Writing as	Featuring	Publisher	Notes
1	1959	Sad Wind from the Sea	Harry Patterson	Mark Hagen	John Long	
2	1960	Cry of the Hunter	Harry Patterson	Martin Fallon	John Long	Martin Fallon Book 1
3	1961	The Thousand Faces of Night	Harry Patterson	Hugh Marlow	John Long	
4	1962	Comes the Dark Stranger	Harry Patterson	Martin Shane	John Long	
5	1962	Hell Is Too Crowded	Harry Patterson	Matthew Brady	John Long	
6	1962	The Testament of Caspar Schultz	Martin Fallon	Paul Chavasse	Abelard-Schuman	Paul Chavasse Book 1 Revised and re-released in 2006 as The Bormann Testament
7	1963	The Dark Side of the Island	Harry Patterson	Hugh Lomax	Fawcett	
8	1963	Pay the Devil	Henry Patterson	Clay Fitzgerald	Barrie & Rockliff	Revised and re-released in 2000 under the same name
9	1963	Seven Pillars to Hell	Hugh Marlowe	Gavin Kane	Abelard-Schuman	Revised and re-released in 1994 as Sheba
10	1963	Year of the Tiger	Martin Fallon	Paul Chavasse	Abelard-Schuman	Paul Chavasse Book 2 Revised and re-released in 1996 under the same name
11	1964	Passage by Night	Hugh Marlowe	Harry Manning	Abelard-Schuman	
12	1964	A Phoenix in the Blood	Henry Patterson	Jay Williams	Barry & Rockliff	
13	1964	Thunder at Noon	Harry Patterson	John Dillinger		Revised and re-released in 1983 as Dillinger
14	1964	Wrath of the Lion	Harry Patterson	Neil Mallory		
15	1965	The Graveyard Shift	Harry Patterson	Nick Miller		Nick Miller Book 1
16	1965	The Keys of Hell	Martin Fallon	Paul Chavasse		Paul Chavasse Book 3 Revised and re-released in 2002 under the same name
17	1966	A Candle for the Dead	Hugh Marlowe	Sean Rogan		Revised and re-released the same year as The Violent Enemy
18	1966	The Iron Tiger	Jack Higgins	Jack Drummond		
19	1966	Midnight Never Comes	Martin Fallon	Paul Chavasse		Paul Chavasse Book 4
20	1967	Brought in Dead	Harry Patterson	Nick Miller		Nick Miller Book 2
21	1967	Dark Side of the Street	Martin Fallon	Paul Chavasse		Paul Chavasse Book 5
22	1968	East of Desolation	Jack Higgins	Joe Martin	Berkley	
23	1968	Hell Is Always Today	Harry Patterson	Nick Miller		Nick Miller Book 3
24	1969	A Fine Night for Dying	Martin Fallon	Paul Chavasse		Paul Chavasse Book 6
25	1969	In the Hour Before Midnight	Jack Higgins	Stacy Wyatt		Revised and re-released the same year as The Sicilian Heritage
26	1970	A Game for Heroes	James Graham	Owen Morgan		
27	1970	Night Judgement at Sinos	Jack Higgins	Jack Savage		
28	1971	The Last Place God Made	Jack Higgins	Sam Hannah		
29	1971	Toll for the Brave	Jack Higgins	Ellis Jackson		
30	1971	The Wrath of God	James Graham	Emmet Kogh		
31	1972	The Khufra Run	James Graham	Jack Nelson		
32	1972	The Savage Day	Jack Higgins	Simon Vaughan	Holt	Simon Vaughan Book 1
33	1973	A Prayer for the Dying	Jack Higgins	Martin Fallon	Holt	Martin Fallon Book 2
34	1974	The Run to Morning	James Graham	Oliver Grant		Revised and re-released the same year as Bloody Passage
35	1975	The Eagle Has Landed	Jack Higgins	Liam Devlin	Holt	Liam Devlin Book 1
36	1976	Storm Warning	Jack Higgins	Paul Gericke	Holt	
37	1977	The Valhalla Exchange	Harry Patterson	Hamilton Canning	Stein and Day	
38	1978	Day of Judgment	Jack Higgins	Simon Vaughan	Holt	Simon Vaughan Book 2
39	1979	To Catch a King	Harry Patterson	Walter Schellenberg	Stein and Day	The final novel to be published under his own name, and not the Jack Higgins pseudonym.
40	1980	Solo	Jack Higgins	Asa Morgan	Stein and Day	Asa Morgan Book 1 Revised and re-released the same year as The Cretan Lover
41	1981	Luciano's Luck	Jack Higgins	Harry Carter	Stein and Day	
42	1982	Touch the Devil	Jack Higgins	Liam Devlin	Stein and Day	Liam Devlin Book 2
43	1983	Exocet	Jack Higgins	Tony Villiers	Stein and Day	Tony Villiers Book 1
44	1985	Confessional	Jack Higgins	Liam Devlin	Stein and Day	Liam Devlin Book 3
45	1986	Night of the Fox	Jack Higgins	Harry Martineau	Simon & Schuster	Dougal Munro and Jack Carter Book 1
46	1989	Memoirs of a Dance Hall Romeo	Jack Higgins	Oliver Shaw	Simon & Schuster	
47	1989	A Season in Hell	Jack Higgins	Tony Villiers	Simon & Schuster	Tony Villiers Book 2
48	1990	Cold Harbour	Jack Higgins	Craig Osbourn	Simon & Schuster	Dougal Munro and Jack Carter Book 2
49	1990	The Eagle Has Flown	Jack Higgins	Liam Devlin	Simon & Schuster	Liam Devlin Book 4
50	1992	Eye of the Storm	Jack Higgins	Sean Dillon	Putnam	Sean Dillon Book 1 Revised and re-released in 1996 as Midnight Man
51	1993	Thunder Point	Jack Higgins	Sean Dillon	Putnam	Sean Dillon Book 2
52	1994	On Dangerous Ground	Jack Higgins	Sean Dillon	Putnam	Sean Dillon Book 3
53	1995	Angel of Death	Jack Higgins	Sean Dillon	Putnam	Sean Dillon Book 4
54	1995	The Morgan Score	Jack Higgins	Asa Morgan	Excerpt (chapter 7) of "Solo"; Published as a short story in "Great Irish Tales Of Horror"	
55	1996	Drink with the Devil	Jack Higgins	Sean Dillon	Putnam	Sean Dillon Book 5
56	1997	The President's Daughter	Jack Higgins	Sean Dillon	Putnam	Sean Dillon Book 6
57	1998	Flight of Eagles	Jack Higgins	Max and Harry Kelso	Putnam	Dougal Munro and Jack Carter Book 3
58	1999	The White House Connection	Jack Higgins	Sean Dillon	Putnam	Sean Dillon Book 7
59	2000	Day of Reckoning	Jack Higgins	Sean Dillon	Putnam	Sean Dillon Book 8
60	2001	Edge of Danger	Jack Higgins	Sean Dillon	Putnam	Sean Dillon Book 9
61	2002	Midnight Runner	Jack Higgins	Sean Dillon	Putnam	Sean Dillon Book 10
62	2003	Bad Company	Jack Higgins	Sean Dillon	Putnam	Sean Dillon Book 11
63	2004	Dark Justice	Jack Higgins	Sean Dillon	Putnam	Sean Dillon Book 12
64	2005	Without Mercy	Jack Higgins	Sean Dillon	Putnam	Sean Dillon Book 13
65	2006	Sure Fire	Jack Higgins	The Chance Twins	Putnam	The Chance Twins Book 1 Co-written with Justin Richards
66	2007	The Killing Ground	Jack Higgins	Sean Dillon	Putnam	Sean Dillon Book 14
67	2007	Rough Justice	Jack Higgins	Sean Dillon	Putnam	Sean Dillon Book 15
68	2008	Death Run	Jack Higgins	The Chance Twins	Putnam	The Chance Twins Book 2 Co-written with Justin Richards
69	2009	A Darker Place	Jack Higgins	Sean Dillon	Putnam	Sean Dillon Book 16
70	2009	First Strike	Jack Higgins	The Chance Twins	Putnam	The Chance Twins Book 3 Co-written with Justin Richards
71	2009	Sharp Shot	Jack Higgins	The Chance Twins	Putnam	The Chance Twins Book 4 Co-written with Justin Richards
72	2009	The Wolf at the Door	Jack Higgins	Sean Dillon	Putnam	Sean Dillon Book 17
73	2010	The Judas Gate	Jack Higgins	Sean Dillon	Putnam	Sean Dillon Book 18
74	2012	A Devil is Waiting	Jack Higgins	Sean Dillon	Putnam	Sean Dillon Book 19
75	2013	The Death Trade	Jack Higgins	Sean Dillon	Putnam	Sean Dillon Book 20
76	2014	Rain on the Dead	Jack Higgins	Sean Dillon	Putnam	Sean Dillon Book 21
77	2016	The Midnight Bell	Jack Higgins	Sean Dillon	Putnam	Sean Dillon Book 22

== Filmography ==
Year	Title	Writing as	Director	Starring	Notes
1967	The Violent Enemy	Hugh Marlowe	Don Sharp	Tom Bell	From the novel A Candle for the Dead
1972	The Wrath of God	James Graham	Ralph Nelson	Robert Mitchum	
1976	The Eagle Has Landed	Jack Higgins	John Sturges	Michael Caine	
1984	To Catch a King	Harry Patterson	Clive Donner	Robert Wagner	Television film
1987	A Prayer for the Dying	Jack Higgins	Mike Hodges	Mickey Rourke	
1989	Confessional	Jack Higgins	Gordon Flemyng	Keith Carradine	Television series, 4 episodes
1990	Night of the Fox	Jack Higgins	Charles Jarrott	George Peppard	Television film
1996	On Dangerous Ground	Jack Higgins	Lawrence Gordon Clark	Rob Lowe	Television film
1996	The Windsor Protocol	Jack Higgins	George Mihalka	Kyle MacLachlan	Television film
1997	Midnight Man	Jack Higgins	Lawrence Gordon Clark	Rob Lowe	Television film, from the novel Eye of the Storm
1998	Thunder Point	Jack Higgins	George Mihalka	Kyle MacLachlan	Television film
