= The Killing Ground (novel) =

2007 novel written by Jack Higgins

- First edition cover
- Author: Jack Higgins
- Publisher: HarperCollins
- Publication date: January 29, 2008
- ISBN: 978-0-399-15380-8

The Killing Ground is a 2007 novel written by British writer Jack Higgins.

Kirkus Reviews asked, "Can any other thrillmeister equal the Higgins corpse-per-page count?" Publishers Weekly said, "The proceedings are complicated; it helps if the reader is a veteran of this long-running series. But it's all pure Higgins: almost every shot hits square between the eyes, and all the characters are hard lads indeed." David Pitt in his review for Booklist said that "the plot seems a bit forced" and that "there is nothing wrong with the novel, but there is nothing especially right about it".
