= Touch the Devil =

1982 book by Jack Higgins

- First edition
- Author: Jack Higgins
- Language: English
- Genre: Thriller Novel
- Publisher: Collins
- Publication date: 1982
- Publication place: United Kingdom
- Media type: Print (hardback and paperback)
- Pages: 452 (paperback edition)
- ISBN: 978-0-00-723481-3

Touch the Devil is the 42nd book by British writer Jack Higgins, first published in 1982 by Collins, and by Stein and Day in the United States.

== Background ==
The novel features Liam Devlin, who appears in other novels by Higgins. It is the second novel to feature Devlin, but the third in internal chronology.

It was published in 1982 by Collins and in 1983 by Pan Books. Out of print for several years, it was republished in 2008.

== Title ==
The title refers to the Irish saying, as quoted by Devlin: “Touch the Devil and you can’t let him go”

== Plot ==
A plot to assassinate British Foreign Secretary, Lord Carrington, who is secretly visiting the President of France in an isolated country location, is called off at the last moment. Jack Corder, a double agent in the organisation of master terrorist, Frank Barry, is killed by Barry, who escapes.

Brigadier Ferguson, head of ‘Group Four’, a covert operation within the British security establishment, and answerable directly to the Prime Minister (never named, but clearly intended to be Margaret Thatcher), for counter-terrorist activities, is instructed to eliminate Barry, by any means. He has already lost three agents planted in Barry's organisation, and must now try a new tack.

Barry, a former IRA gunman and now psychopathic gun-for-hire, who is being paid by the Russians, is given his next job. He is to obtain details of a new West German anti-tank rocket system, and, better still, the rockets themselves. They are due to be demonstrated at a British army proving ground, near Wast Water, in the English Lake District, after being flown in to a disused former RAF station. His handler, Nikolai Belov, officially a cultural attaché at the Soviet embassy in Paris, but actually a KGB Colonel, arranges false documents, money and equipment.

Heavily disguised, Barry travels by hydrofoil to Jersey in the Channel Islands, from where he flies to Manchester. In a rented car, he drives to the seaside town of Morecambe, where an anonymous contact delivers firearms and other equipment, as arranged by Belov. He then drives to a small village near Ravenglass, not far from the army proving ground.

The plan is to escape out to sea with the stolen weapons, to board a Russian fishing boat. His local contact, Salter, an undertaker and embalmer whom Belov has used before, provides two powerful boats, and an isolated farmhouse to base himself in. He also meets Hedley Preston and Sam Varley, thugs-for-hire, recruited by Salter from the Liverpool underworld, to provide armed muscle. But Barry doesn't trust them, especially after a drunken Varley tries to rape Jenny, Salter's young assistant.

On the basis of ‘Set a thief to catch a thief’, Ferguson decides that the only person to eliminate Barry is Martin Brosnan, American-born an ex-Airborne Rangers sergeant who fought in Vietnam, former friend of Barry and IRA killer. But he's serving a life sentence in France's impenetrable Belle Isle prison. And the only person to get him out of prison is fellow IRA terrorist, Liam Devlin, now a Professor, teaching in Dublin, who is ‘untouchable’ in Eire.

Ferguson and Harry Fox, his personal assistant, task the Special Air Service to kidnap Devlin. They send Captain Tony Villiers and a small team of troopers, undercover, who kidnap Devlin at his weekend cottage, smuggle him over the border into Ulster and bring him unharmed to London.

Ferguson threatens Devlin with trial, on charges that would almost certainly get him a life sentence, but Devlin claims that the charges would not stand up in court, due to his being kidnapped illegally. Ferguson already knows this, and plays his trump card. He shows Devlin film of a young girl, Norah Cassidy, Brosnan's cousin, who Devlin also knew. She had been Barry's mistress, then turned into a drug addict, and died in agony.

Devlin is horrified and agrees to fall in with Ferguson's plan. He is to fly to Marseille and gain entry to the island prison, using the identity of a lawyer concerned with Brosnan's family business.

Anne-Marie Audin, a famous French photographer, who knew Brosnan well and was rescued by him when under fire in Vietnam, asked Devlin to let her come along, although Brosnan has previously refused to see her.

Devlin visits Brosnan, and plans his escape, with the assistance of the criminal organization, the Unione Corse. Brosnan's cell-mate, Jacques Savary, is a former senior member of the Unione, and his son, Jean-Paul, living in Marseille, agrees to provide facilities and equipment. But the plan they devise is dangerous and fraught with risks.

Barry's hijacking of the army convoy carrying the rockets goes ahead. One sergeant is killed; the rest are incapacitated with gas grenades. He loads the rockets onto a Land-Rover and drives to the waiting boats; Preston and Varley are shot dead by Barry, when they demand more money. Jenny is also accidentally killed.

Departing from his plan, as agreed with Belov, he pays off Salter, conceals the rockets in waterproof containers on one of the boats, which he sinks. He departs for Manchester airport. However, his trip from Jersey back to France is delayed by technical problems.

A report on the incident, written by Ferguson, solely for the eyes of the Prime Minister, is leaked via Mary Baxter, a mole in Ferguson's office, whose lover is a KGB Captain at the Soviet embassy in London. The report is coded and sent to Paris, but Belov is temporarily away in Berlin.

Brosnan and Savary accomplish their escape, via the sewers of the prison. With lifejackets and other equipment smuggled in by Devlin, they plan to throw themselves into the turbulent waters surrounding the island from the ‘funeral rock’, to be, hopefully, picked up by a boat owned by the Unione. Devlin and Anne-Marie are also on board.

The waters surrounding the island, known as the ‘Mill Race’, are notoriously dangerous, but the two men survive, are picked up and returned to shore. Eternally grateful, Jean-Paul spirits his father away to be hidden in Algeria, whilst Brosnan is taken to Anne-Marie's small farm in the hills near Nice, where they can hide in safety.

Barry learns that the bodies of Savary and Brosnan have been washed up dead, but doesn't fully believe it. They are in fact bodies of recently dead people obtained from a mortuary by the Unione, and faked to appear as Brosnan's and Savary's.

Barry, having blackmailed Belov to pay him a lot more money for the rockets, also learns that Anne-Marie and Devlin are hiding out at the farm. He scopes out the area, realizes that Brosnan is in fact still alive, and recruits local armed muscle, using Belov's contacts.

He ambushes and kills Devlin (as he thinks), but the latter survives, thanks to body armor, provided by Jean-Paul. He leaves Brosnan to be killed by the henchmen, but Brosnan kills them and escapes. Anne-Marie is drugged and kidnapped by Barry to be taken to Paris.

Devlin and Brosnan follow, and force Belov to tell them where Barry is; He has hired a light plane and is flying to England to collect the sunken rockets. With Unione contacts and assistance, Devlin and Brosnan follow. In a shootout, Barry is finally killed.

In a final twist, before he dies, Barry tells Brosnan that Ferguson has lied to him; Norah Cassidy actually died after being tortured by the French secret service.

Furious, he blames the Prime Minister, who knew the true story; that Ferguson needed Brosnan to be angry enough to undertake the job.

He manages, through various contacts, to gain access to the Prime Minister's office in Downing Street, disguised as a waiter with a catering firm at a Christmas party. Armed, he enters the PM's office. He could have shot her, but instead leaves a flower on her desk – a gesture he has previously employed, to prove that he can successfully penetrate security cordons, and escape undetected. He leaves, and is not seen again.

The end of the novel sees Anne-Marie and Devlin back in his cottage in Ireland.
