= Churchill and the Generals =

1979 British TV drama

- Written by: Ian Curteis
- Directed by: Alan Gibson
- Starring: Timothy West, Eric Porter, Arthur Hill
- Theme music composer: Wilfred Josephs
- Country of origin: United Kingdom
- Original language: English

Production
- Producers: Jack Levin; Alan Shallcross

Original release
- Network: BBC2
- Release: 1979

Churchill and the Generals is a 1979 BBC television drama concerning the relationship between Winston Churchill and generals of the Allied forces, set in the Cabinet Office and War Rooms between 1940 and 1945. It was written by Ian Curteis (with Peter Young as military advisor).

It was first broadcast on BBC2 on 23 September 1979, and repeated on BBC1 on 22 August 1981. It screened on 5 March 1981 in the United States.

The Times television critic Michael Ratcliffe wrote: 'Churchill, though trivial, was intermittently moving and fun (alternative title: Punch in the Second World War?)'

Timothy West won the John Logie Baird performance award (1980). He reprised the role of Churchill in The Last Bastion (1984) and Hiroshima (1995).

== Cast ==
- Timothy West - Winston Churchill
- Eric Porter - General (Field Marshal from 1944) Sir Alan Brooke
- Arthur Hill - Franklin D. Roosevelt
- Joseph Cotten - George C. Marshall
- Richard Dysart - Dwight D. Eisenhower
- Ian Richardson - General Sir Bernard L. Montgomery
- Patrick Allen - General Sir Claude Auchinleck
- Alexander Knox - Henry Stimson, Secretary of War
- Robert Arden - Harry Hopkins
- Paul Hardwick - General Sir Hastings Ismay
- Peter Copley - Field Marshal Sir John Dill
- Patrick Magee - Field Marshal Sir Archibald Wavell
- Terence Alexander - General Sir Harold Alexander
- Lyndon Brook - King George VI
- Amanda Walker - Queen Elizabeth
- Richard Easton - Anthony Eden
- Geoffrey Keen - Sir Charles Wilson (the 1st Baron Moran from 1943)
- Bernard Archard - Lord Halifax
- Edward Jewesbury - Neville Chamberlain
- Barry Jackson - Clement Attlee
- Jacques Duby - Paul Reynaud
- André Maranne - Gen. Maurice Gamelin
- Jacques Boudet - Brig. Gen. Charles de Gaulle
- Noel Coleman - Field Marshal Sir Edmund Ironside
- Noel Johnson - Admiral Sir Bertram Ramsay
- Robert Raglan - General Sir Maitland Wilson
