= Day of Reckoning (novel) =

2000 novel by Jack Higgins

First edition (publ. HarperCollins)

Day Of Reckoning is a mafia-themed novel by Jack Higgins, first published in 2000. It is one of a series of books featuring the ex-IRA philosopher/killer Sean Dillon as the antihero. It debuted at No. 6 on the Publishers Weekly bestseller list for fiction.

== Plot summary ==
Katherine Johnson, a New York journalist, befriends businessman Jack Fox in order to write an article on his business success. Fox learns that she plans to expose him as a Mafia member and nephew of a Mafia family, and he has her killed. Her ex-husband, Blake Johnson, an ex-FBI agent now heading a special unit in the White House learns of the death, and he vows to destroy Fox and all he represents. Armed with a Presidential mandate, he flies to London and contacts Brigadier Ferguson of the Ministry of Defence. Together with Hannah Bernstein, a Detective Superintendent with Special Branch and Sean Dillon, an ex-IRA gunman and mercenary now working for the British government on black operations, he launches a series of operations to bring Fox down.

Their first foray involves causing Fox's London casino to be caught using loaded dice; this has the effect of closing down the casino and Fox's other gambling interests.

The next operation sees Johnson and Dillon join with a Mossad commando force to destroy a ship in Beirut harbour which is loaded with missiles destined to be used against Israel. Johnson is wounded in the action.

Dillon recruits Billy Salter, a young but enthusiastic London gangster, for the next operation, in which they land commando style on the coast on County Louth in Ireland to destroy a cache of weaponry in which Fox has a large financial interest.

Finally, they foil a plot by gangsters working for Fox to steal several million pounds' worth of diamonds from a London safe deposit.

Johnson is captured by Fox's henchmen and taken to his mansion in Cornwall. Dillon and Billy plan a parachute landing and attack the mansion. Whilst Johnson is released, Fox is killed. His minders escape to London and report to Fox's uncle and patron Don Marco Solazzo, who comes himself to London for what he hopes will be a final showdown. Solazzo and his henchmen die in the ensuing fight on a boat in the Thames.

== Reception ==
Publishers Weekly praised the "jaunty, even slapdash feel to the storytelling in Higgins's exciting new novel", arguing that the "clipped dialogue and minimal exposition suit their subject well". It describes the main characters as "men (and, occasionally, women) of few words and swift action", "tarnished warriors who value honor over life and who get the job done no matter what the cost".
