= The Eagle Has Landed (novel) =

1975 novel by Jack Higgins

- First edition
- Author: Jack Higgins
- Language: English
- Genre: War, Thriller Novel
- Publisher: Collins
- Publication date: 8 September 1975
- Publication place: United Kingdom
- Media type: Print (hardback and paperback)
- Pages: 352 (hardcover edition); 356 (paperback edition)
- ISBN: 0-00-221208-0 (hardcover edition); ISBN 0-671-01934-1 (paperback edition)
- OCLC: 1993343
- Dewey Decimal: 823/.9/14
- LC Class: PZ4.H6367 Eag PR6058.I343

The Eagle Has Landed is a book by British writer Jack Higgins, set during World War II and first published in 1975. It was quickly adapted into a British film of the same name, released in 1976.

== Plot ==
The narrative begins with the frame story of author Jack Higgins discovering the grave of 14 Fallschirmjäger paratroopers in an English graveyard. Their tombstones describe them as having been killed in action in November 1943.

Following the Gran Sasso raid in which Fallschirmjäger freed Benito Mussolini from Italian government captivity, Adolf Hitler and Heinrich Himmler push for a similar plan to kidnap Winston Churchill. Wilhelm Canaris, the head of the Abwehr, is ordered to make a feasibility study of kidnapping Churchill from England. Canaris half-heartedly orders his subordinate, Oberst Radl, to undertake the study.

Radl's staff receive a routine tip from a German spy in England, codenamed Starling, that Churchill is scheduled to weekend at a country house in the village of Studley Constable in Norfolk. Starling is an Afrikaner named Joanna Grey, a longtime Abwehr agent who has a vendetta against the British after losing her family in the Second Boer War. Grey's reports convince Radl a plan to kidnap Churchill and transport him to Germany would succeed, but Canaris orders him to abandon it. Himmler, having learnt of the plan, orders him to execute it without informing Canaris. Radl arranges for Liam Devlin, a IRA member and reluctant Abwehr agent, to be smuggled to Norfolk through Northern Ireland. Posing as a wounded British Army veteran, Devlin makes contact with Grey at her house in Studley Constable. She arranges a position for him as gamekeeper in the country house. While awaiting further developments, Devlin becomes romantically involved with local girl Molly Prior after saving her from an attempted rape.

Radl travels to Alderney to recruit disgraced Fallschirmjäger officer Oberst Kurt Steiner, exiled there for trying to help a young Jewish girl escape from the SS during the Warsaw Ghetto Uprising. Steiner accepts the mission to ensure the safety of his anti-Nazi father, and is transported to an airfield in the Netherlands with his men. The team is joined by British Free Corps member Harvey Preston, whom Himmler sends as an SS observer. The team, dressed and equipped as Free Polish paratroopers is airdropped into Norfolk by a captured C-47.

The team successfully infiltrates Studley Constable posing as Allied soldiers on maneuvers. When one of Steiner's men is killed rescuing an English girl from drowning, his identity as a German is revealed. Local priest Father Vereker informs nearby US Rangers, who launch an uncoordinated attack on the Germans, who are holding the villagers hostage in the parish church. The incompetent commanding officer of the Rangers is killed in the unsuccessful attack and his subordinate, Captain Harry Clark, parleys with the Germans. Steiner releases the villagers as a show of good faith, but refuses to surrender. Clark orders another attack which is more successful, wiping out almost all of the team. Steiner and Devlin escape with help from Molly. Determined to finish the mission, Steiner abandons escape in favour of finishing his mission. He confronts Churchill, but hesitates and is shot by military police. Upon hearing news of the mission's failure, Radl suffers a heart attack while Himmler orders his arrest for high treason.

Higgins meets with the terminally ill Vereker in the present day, and learns that Churchill was actually en route to the Tehran Conference when the mission occurred, and the man Steiner confronted was a political decoy.

== Publication details ==
- 1975, US, Bantam Books ISBN 0-553-02500-7
- 1975, US, Holt, Rinehart and Winston ISBN 0-03-013746- 2

== Reception ==
This book rapidly became a bestseller. As of 2010, it has sold more than 50 million copies.

== Adaptation ==
The film rights were purchased and an adaptation was quickly prepared. In 1976, a British film of the same name was released, the last film directed by John Sturges. It starred Michael Caine, Donald Sutherland, Jenny Agutter, and Robert Duvall. Its success also stimulated more book sales.

== Sequel ==
Higgins wrote a sequel called The Eagle Has Flown, which was published in 1991. It was also set during World War II.

Higgins featured his character of Liam Devlin in several later thrillers. He is older and acts as a mentor to Sean Dillon and Martin Brosnan. In Higgins' novel Confessional (1985), Devlin allies with MI6 to prevent a rogue KGB assassin from murdering Pope John Paul II.
