= The Valiant Years =

British-american filmseries based on W. Churchill's Memoires, by ABC

The Valiant Years was a documentary produced by ABC based on the memoirs of Winston Churchill, directed by Anthony Bushell and John Schlesinger, narrated by Gary Merrill and with extracts from the memoirs voiced by Richard Burton. It ran in the United States from 1960 to 1961, in 27 30-minute episodes and was broadcast in the UK by the BBC from February to August 1961. Its incidental music was written by Richard Rodgers, who won an Emmy for it in 1962. Scriptwriters included Victor Wolfson a dramatist and writer, playwright William Templeton, Quentin Reynolds, William L. Shirer, an American journalist, war correspondent and historian, and Richard Tregaskis. One of the programme's London-based producers was actor Patrick Macnee, just prior to his being cast as secret agent John Steed in the long-running cult TV series The Avengers.

== Awards ==
- Richard Rodgers won an Emmy award in 1962 for the music he wrote for the programme.
- Victor Wolfson, who wrote several episodes, won an Emmy Award 1960–1961 for Outstanding Writing Achievement in the Documentary Field.

== List of episodes ==
1. The Gathering Storm
2. Combat Deepens
3. Dunkirk
4. French Agony
5. Take One with You
6. The Ravens Remain
7. Struggle at Sea
8. Hinge of Fate
9. Alone no More
10. Out of the East
11. The Torch is Lit
12. Sand and Snow
13. Strike Hard, Strike Home!
14. Closing the Ring
15. Be Sure you Win
16. Turning of the Tide
17. The Die is Cast
18. D-Day
19. Europe Set Ablaze
20. Triumph in France
21. Beginning of the End
22. Final Christmas
23. Yalta
24. Tying the Knot
25. Götterdämmerung
26. Goodbye, Mr Churchill
27. The Will to Victory
