= List of films based on manga =

This is a list of films based on manga. It includes films that are adaptations of manga, and those films whose characters originated in those comics.

== Japanese productions ==
=== Animated ===
Film	Manga	Year
Uchū e Irasshai!	21 Emon	1981
To Space! The Barefoot Princess	21 Emon	1992
Ai City	Ai City	1986
Aim for the Ace!	Aim for the Ace!	1979
Ajin Part 1: Shōdō	Ajin: Demi-Human	2015
Ajin Part 2: Shōtotsu	Ajin: Demi-Human	2016
Ajin Part 3: Shōgeki	Ajin: Demi-Human	2016
Akira	Akira	1988
Andromeda Stories	Andromeda Stories	1982
Appleseed	Appleseed	1988
Appleseed	Appleseed	2004
Appleseed Alpha	Appleseed	2014
Appleseed Ex Machina	Appleseed	2007
Attack No.1: The Movie	Attack No.1	1970
Revolution	Attack No.1	1970
World Championship	Attack No.1	1970
Immortal Bird	Attack No.1	1971
Bagi, the Monster of Mighty Nature	Bagi, the Boss of the Earth (Daichi no Kaoyaku Bagi)	1984
Barefoot Gen	Barefoot Gen	1983
Barefoot Gen 2	Barefoot Gen	1986
Bats & Terry	Bats & Terry	1987
Bakusō Kyōdai Let's & Go!! WGP Bōsō Miniyonku Dai Tsuiseki!	Bakusō Kyōdai Let's & Go!!	1997
Golden Age Arc I: Egg of the Supreme Ruler	Berserk	2012
Golden Age Arc II: The Battle for Doldrey	Berserk	2012
Golden Age Arc III: Descent	Berserk	2012
Beyblade: Fierce Battle	Beyblade	2002
Guyver: Out of Control	Bio Booster Armor Guyver	1986
Black Jack: The Movie	Black Jack	1996
The Two Doctors of Darkness	Black Jack	2005
Blade of the Phantom Master	Blade of the Phantom Master	2004
Blame!	Blame!	2017
Memories of Nobody	BLEACH	2006
The DiamondDust Rebellion	BLEACH	2007
Fade to Black	BLEACH	2008
Hell Verse	BLEACH	2010
Bonobono	Bonobono	1993
Kumomo no Ki no Koto	Bonobono	2002
Break of Dawn	Break of Dawn	2022
Buddha	Buddha	2011
Buddha 2: Tezuka Osamu no Buddha ~Owarinaki Tabi~	Buddha	2014
Cardcaptor Sakura: The Movie	Cardcaptor Sakura	1999
The Sealed Card	Cardcaptor Sakura	2000
Captain	Captain	1981
Europe Daikessen	Captain Tsubasa	1985
Ayaushi, Zen Nippon Jr.	Captain Tsubasa	1985
Asu ni Mukatte Hashire	Captain Tsubasa	1986
Sekai Daikessen!! Jr. World Cup	Captain Tsubasa	1986
Chibi Maruko-chan	Chibi Maruko-chan	1990
Watashi no Suki na Uta	Chibi Maruko-chan	1992
Italia Kara Kita Shōnen	Chibi Maruko-chan	2015
Chiikawa the Movie: The Secret of the Mermaid Island	Chiikawa	2026
From Up on Poppy Hill	Coquelicot-zaka kara	2011
Action Mask vs. Leotard Devil	Crayon Shin-chan	1993
The Hidden Treasure of the Buri Buri Kingdom	Crayon Shin-chan	1994
Unkokusai's Ambition	Crayon Shin-chan	1995
Great Adventure in Henderland	Crayon Shin-chan	1996
Pursuit of the Balls of Darkness	Crayon Shin-chan	1997
Blitzkrieg! Pig's Hoof's Secret Mission	Crayon Shin-chan	1998
Explosion! The Hot Spring's Feel Good Final Battle	Crayon Shin-chan	1999
Jungle That Invites Storm	Crayon Shin-chan	2000
Fierceness That Invites Storm! The Adult Empire Strikes Back	Crayon Shin-chan	2001
Fierceness That Invites Storm! The Battle of the Warring States	Crayon Shin-chan	2002
Fierceness That Invites Storm! Yakiniku Road of Honor	Crayon Shin-chan	2003
Fierceness That Invites Storm! The Kasukabe Boys of the Evening Sun	Crayon Shin-chan	2004
The Legend Called Buri Buri 3 Minutes Charge	Crayon Shin-chan	2005
The Legend Called: Dance! Amigo!	Crayon Shin-chan	2006
Fierceness That Invites Storm! The Singing Buttocks Bomb	Crayon Shin-chan	2007
Fierceness That Invites Storm! The Hero of Kinpoko	Crayon Shin-chan	2008
Roar! Kasukabe Animal Kingdom	Crayon Shin-chan	2009
Super-Dimension! The Storm Called My Bride	Crayon Shin-chan	2010
Fierceness That Invites Storm! Operation Golden Spy	Crayon Shin-chan	2011
Fierceness That Invites Storm! Me and the Space Princess	Crayon Shin-chan	2012
Very Tasty! B-class Gourmet Survival!!	Crayon Shin-chan	2013
Intense Battle! Robo Dad Strikes Back	Crayon Shin-chan	2014
My Moving Story! Cactus Large Attack!	Crayon Shin-chan	2015
Fast Asleep! The Great Assault on Dreamy World!	Crayon Shin-chan	2016
Invasion!! Alien Shiriri	Crayon Shin-chan	2017
Burst Serving! Kung Fu Boys ~Ramen Rebellion~	Crayon Shin-chan	2018
Honeymoon Hurricane ~The Lost Hiroshi~	Crayon Shin-chan	2019
Crash! Graffiti Kingdom and Almost Four Heroes	Crayon Shin-chan	2020
Shrouded in Mystery! The Flowers of Tenkazu Academy	Crayon Shin-chan	2021
Mononoke Ninja Chinpūden	Crayon Shin-chan	2022
Battle of Supernatural Powers ~Flying Sushi~	Crayon Shin-chan	2023
Our Dinosaur Diary	Crayon Shin-chan	2024
Super Hot! The Spicy Kasukabe Dancers	Crayon Shin-chan	2025
Spooky! My Yokai Vacation	Crayon Shin-chan	2026
Cyborg 009	Cyborg 009	1966
Monster Wars	Cyborg 009	1967
Legend of the Super Galaxy	Cyborg 009	1980
009 Re:Cyborg	Cyborg 009	2012
Darkside Blues	Darkside Blues	1994
The Time-Bombed Skyscraper	Detective Conan	1997
The Fourteenth Target	Detective Conan	1998
The Last Wizard of the Century	Detective Conan	1999
Captured in Her Eyes	Detective Conan	2000
Countdown to Heaven	Detective Conan	2001
The Phantom of Baker Street	Detective Conan	2002
Crossroad in the Ancient Capital	Detective Conan	2003
Magician of the Silver Sky	Detective Conan	2004
Strategy Above the Depths	Detective Conan	2005
The Private Eyes' Requiem	Detective Conan	2006
Jolly Roger in the Deep Azure	Detective Conan	2007
Full Score of Fear	Detective Conan	2008
The Raven Chaser	Detective Conan	2009
The Lost Ship in the Sky	Detective Conan	2010
Quarter of Silence	Detective Conan	2011
The Eleventh Striker	Detective Conan	2012
Private Eye in the Distant Sea	Detective Conan	2013
Lupin the 3rd vs. Detective Conan	Detective Conan	2013
Dimensional Sniper	Detective Conan	2014
Sunflowers of Inferno	Detective Conan	2015
The Darkest Nightmare	Detective Conan	2016
The Crimson Love Letter	Detective Conan	2017
Zero the Enforcer	Detective Conan	2018
The Fist of Blue Sapphire	Detective Conan	2019
The Scarlet Bullet	Detective Conan	2021
The Bride of Halloween	Detective Conan	2022
Black Iron Submarine	Detective Conan	2023
The Million-dollar Pentagram	Detective Conan	2024
One-eyed Flashback	Detective Conan	2025
Fallen Angel of the Highway	Detective Conan	2026
Nobita's Dinosaur	Doraemon	1980
The Records of Nobita, Spaceblazer	Doraemon	1981
Nobita and the Haunts of Evil	Doraemon	1982
Nobita and the Castle of the Undersea Devil	Doraemon	1983
Nobita's Great Adventure into the Underworld	Doraemon	1984
Nobita's Little Star Wars	Doraemon	1985
Nobita and the Steel Troops	Doraemon	1986
Nobita and the Knights on Dinosaurs	Doraemon	1987
The Record of Nobita's Parallel Visit to the West	Doraemon	1988
Nobita and the Birth of Japan	Doraemon	1989
Nobita and the Animal Planet	Doraemon	1990
Nobita's Dorabian Nights	Doraemon	1991
Nobita and the Kingdom of Clouds	Doraemon	1992
Nobita and the Tin Labyrinth	Doraemon	1993
Nobita's Three Visionary Swordsmen	Doraemon	1994
Nobita's Diary on the Creation of the World	Doraemon	1995
Nobita and the Galaxy Super-express	Doraemon	1996
Nobita and the Spiral City	Doraemon	1997
Nobita's Great Adventure in the South Seas	Doraemon	1998
Nobita Drifts in the Universe	Doraemon	1999
Nobita and the Legend of the Sun King	Doraemon	2000
Nobita and the Winged Braves	Doraemon	2001
Nobita in the Robot Kingdom	Doraemon	2002
Nobita and the Windmasters	Doraemon	2003
Nobita in the Wan-Nyan Spacetime Odyssey	Doraemon	2004
Nobita's Dinosaur 2006	Doraemon	2006
Nobita's New Great Adventure into the Underworld	Doraemon	2007
Nobita and the Green Giant Legend	Doraemon	2008
The Record of Nobita's Spaceblazer	Doraemon	2009
Nobita's Great Battle of the Mermaid King	Doraemon	2010
Nobita and the New Steel Troops—Winged Angels	Doraemon	2011
Nobita and the Island of Miracles—Animal Adventure	Doraemon	2012
Nobita's Secret Gadget Museum	Doraemon	2013
New Nobita's Great Demon—Peko and the Exploration Party of Five	Doraemon	2014
Stand by Me Doraemon	Doraemon	2014
Nobita's Space Heroes	Doraemon	2015
Nobita and the Birth of Japan 2016	Doraemon	2016
Nobita's Great Adventure in the Antarctic Kachi Kochi	Doraemon	2017
Nobita's Treasure Island	Doraemon	2018
Nobita's Chronicle of the Moon Exploration	Doraemon	2019
Nobita's New Dinosaur	Doraemon	2020
Stand by Me Doraemon 2	Doraemon	2020
Nobita's Little Star Wars 2021	Doraemon	2022
Nobita's Sky Utopia	Doraemon	2023
Nobita's Earth Symphony	Doraemon	2024
Nobita's Art World Tales	Doraemon	2025
New Nobita and the Castle of the Undersea Devil	Doraemon	2026
Nobita's Steam-Powered Time Machine	Doraemon	2027
Home of Acorns	Donguri no Ie	1997
Dr. Slump and Arale-chan: Hello! Wonder Island	Dr. Slump	1981
Dr. Slump: "Hoyoyo!" Space Adventure	Dr. Slump	1982
Dr. Slump and Arale-chan: Hoyoyo, Great Round-the-World Race	Dr. Slump	1983
Dr. Slump and Arale-chan: Hoyoyo, Great Round-the-World Race	Dr. Slump	1984
Dr. Slump and Arale-chan: Hoyoyo! City of Dreams, Mechapolis	Dr. Slump	1985
Dr. Slump and Arale-chan: N-cha! Clear Skies Over Penguin Village	Dr. Slump	1993
Dr. Slump and Arale-chan: N-cha! From Penguin Village with Love	Dr. Slump	1993
Dr. Slump and Arale-chan: Hoyoyo!! Follow the Rescued Shark...	Dr. Slump	1994
Dr. Slump and Arale-chan: N-cha!! Excited Heart of Summer Vacation	Dr. Slump	1994
Doctor Slump: Arale's Surprise Burn	Dr. Slump	1999
Dr. Slump: Dr. Mashirito and Abale-chan	Dr. Slump	2007
Curse of the Blood Rubies	Dragon Ball	1986
Sleeping Princess in Devil's Castle	Dragon Ball	1987
Mystical Adventure	Dragon Ball	1988
Dead Zone	Dragon Ball	1989
The World's Strongest	Dragon Ball	1990
The Tree of Might	Dragon Ball	1990
Lord Slug	Dragon Ball	1991
Cooler's Revenge	Dragon Ball	1991
The Return of Cooler	Dragon Ball	1992
Super Android 13	Dragon Ball	1992
Broly: The Legendary Super Saiyan	Dragon Ball	1993
Bojack Unbound	Dragon Ball	1993
Broly: Second Coming	Dragon Ball	1994
Bio-Broly	Dragon Ball	1994
Fusion Reborn	Dragon Ball	1995
Wrath of the Dragon	Dragon Ball	1995
The Path to Power	Dragon Ball	1996
Battle of Gods	Dragon Ball	2013
Resurrection 'F'	Dragon Ball	2015
Broly	Dragon Ball	2018
Super Hero	Dragon Ball	2022
Curse of the Death Phoenix	Duel Masters	2005
Lunatic God Saga	Duel Masters	2009
Blazing Bonds XX	Duel Masters	2010
Hamukatsu to Dogiragon no Curry-pan Dai-bōken	Duel Masters	2016
Hoshizora no Dancing Doll	Esper Mami	1988
The Phoenix Priestess	Fairy Tail	2012
Dragon Cry	Fairy Tail	2017
Fist of the North Star	Fist of the North Star	1986
The Legend of Raoh – Chapter of Love in Death	Fist of the North Star	2006
The Legend of Raoh – Chapter of Fierce Fighting	Fist of the North Star	2007
Zero: The Legend of Kenshiro	Fist of the North Star	2008
The Five Star Stories	The Five Star Stories	1989
Flying Phantom Ship	Yurei Ship	1969
Conqueror of Shamballa	Fullmetal Alchemist	2005
The Sacred Star of Milos	Fullmetal Alchemist	2011
Furiten-kun	Furiten-kun	1981
Galaxy Express 999	Galaxy Express 999	1979
Adieu Galaxy Express 999	Galaxy Express 999	1981
Eternal Fantasy	Galaxy Express 999	1998
Ganbare!! Tabuchi-kun!!	Ganbare!! Tabuchi-kun!!	1979
Gekitō Pennant Race	Ganbare!! Tabuchi-kun!!	1980
Hatsu Warai 3: Aa Tsuppari Jinsei	Ganbare!! Tabuchi-kun!!	1980
Gantz: O	Gantz	2016
1,000 Year Old Cursed Song	GeGeGe no Kitarō	2008
Harmagedon	Genma Wars	1983
Ghost in the Shell	Ghost in the Shell	1995
Innocence	Ghost in the Shell	2004
Kōkaku Kidōtai Shin Gekijōban	Ghost in the Shell	2015
Ghost Sweeper Mikami: The Great Paradise Battle!!	Ghost Sweeper Mikami	1994
A New Retelling Benizakura Arc	Gin Tama	2010
Gintama: The Movie: The Final Chapter: Be Forever Yorozuya	Gin Tama	2013
Golgo 13: The Professional	Golgo 13	1983
Grey: Digital Target	Grey	1986
Gu Gu Ganmo	Gu Gu Ganmo	1985
Haguregumo	Haguregumo	1982
Hajime no Ippo: Champion Road	Hajime no Ippo	2003
Adventures in Ham-Ham Land	Hamtaro	2001
The Captive Princess	Hamtaro	2002
Miracle in Aurora Valley	Hamtaro	2003
Hamtaro and the Demon of the Picture Book Tower	Hamtaro	2004
Hayate the Combat Butler! Heaven Is a Place on Earth	Hayate the Combat Butler	2011
Hetalia: Axis Powers – Paint it, White!	Hetalia: Axis Powers	2010
Hiatari Ryōkō! Ka – su – mi: Yume no Naka ni Kimi ga Ita	Hiatari Ryōkō!	1988
Porco Rosso	Hikōtei Jidai	1992
Hotarubi no Mori e	Hotarubi no Mori e	2011
Phantom Rouge	Hunter × Hunter	2013
The Last Mission	Hunter × Hunter	2013
Initial D: Third Stage	Initial D	2001
Shin Gekijō-ban Initial D	Initial D	2014
Affections Touching Across Time	InuYasha	2001
The Castle Beyond the Looking Glass	InuYasha	2002
Swords of an Honorable Ruler	InuYasha	2003
Fire on the Mystic Island	InuYasha	2004
JoJo's Bizarre Adventure: Phantom Blood	JoJo's Bizarre Adventure	2007
The Kabocha Wine: Nita no Aijou Monogatari	The Kabocha Wine	1984
Kaguya-sama: Love Is War – The First Kiss That Never Ends	Kaguya-sama: Love is War	2022
Hengen Taima Yakō Karura Mau! Nara Onryō Emaki	Karura Mau	1989
Kimagure Orange Road: Shonen Jump Special	Kimagure Orange Road	1985
I Want to Return to That Day	Kimagure Orange Road	1988
Shin Kimagure Orange Road: Summer's Beginning	Kimagure Orange Road	1996
Jungle Emperor Leo	Kimba the White Lion	1997
Kindaichi Shounen no Jikenbo	Kindaichi Shounen no Jikenbo	1996
Kindaichi Shounen no Jikenbo 2 – Satsuriku no Deep Blue	Kindaichi Shounen no Jikenbo	1999
Stolen Championship Belt	Kinnikuman	1984
Great Riot! Seigi Choujin	Kinnikuman	1984
Seigi Choujin vs. Ancient Choujin	Kinnikuman	1985
Counterattack! The Underground Space Choujin	Kinnikuman	1985
Hour of Triumph! Seigi Choujin	Kinnikuman	1985
Crisis in New York!	Kinnikuman	1986
Seigi Choujin vs. Senshi Choujin	Kinnikuman	1986
Kinnikuman Nisei the Movie	Kinnikuman Nisei	2001
Muscle Carrot Competition! The Great Choujin War	Kinnikuman Nisei	2002
Kochira Katsushika-ku Kameari Kōen-mae Hashutsujo	Kochira Katsushika-ku Kameari Koen-mae Hashutsujo	1985
Kochira Katsushika-ku Kameari Kōen-mae Hashutsujo: The Movie	Kochira Katsushika-ku Kameari Koen-mae Hashutsujo	1999
Kochira Katsushika-ku Kameari Kōen-mae Hashutsujo: The Movie 2: UFO Shūrai! Tornado Daisakusen!!	Kochira Katsushika-ku Kameari Koen-mae Hashutsujo	2003
Kochira Katsushika-ku Kameari Kōen-mae Hashutsujo – The Final: Kankichi Ryotsu's Last Day	Kochira Katsushika-ku Kameari Koen-mae Hashutsujo	2016
K-On!	K-On!	2011
Konjiki no Gash Bell!! Movie 1: Unlisted Demon 101	Konjiki no Gash!!	2004
Konjiki no Gash Bell!! Movie 2: Attack of the Mecha-Vulcan	Konjiki no Gash!!	2004
In This Corner of the World	Kono Sekai no Katasumi ni	2016
Locke the Superman	Locke the Superman	1984
The Mystery of Mamo	Lupin the Third	1978
The Castle of Cagliostro	Lupin the Third	1979
Legend of the Gold of Babylon	Lupin the Third	1985
The Fuma Conspiracy	Lupin the Third	1987
Farewell to Nostradamus	Lupin the Third	1995
Lupin III: Dead or Alive	Lupin the Third	1996
Bye Bye, Lady Liberty	Lupin the Third	1989
Episode 0: The First Contact	Lupin the Third	2002
Lupin the 3rd vs. Detective Conan	Lupin the Third	2009
Lupin the 3rd vs. Detective Conan: The Movie	Lupin the Third	2013
Jigen's Gravestone	Lupin the Third	2014
Goemon's Blood Spray	Lupin the Third	2017
Fujiko's Lie	Lupin the Third	2019
Lupin III: The First	Lupin the Third	2019
Maison Ikkoku: The Final Chapter	Maison Ikkoku	1988
Makoto-Chan	Makoto-chan	1980
Metropolis	Metropolis	2001
Whisper of the Heart	Mimi o Sumaseba	1995
Midori	Mr. Arashi's Amazing Freak Show	1992
Two Heroes	My Hero Academia	2018
Heroes Rising	My Hero Academia	2019
World Heroes' Mission	My Hero Academia	2021
You're Next	My Hero Academia	2024
Ninja Clash in the Land of Snow	Naruto	2004
Legend of the Stone of Gelel	Naruto	2005
Guardians of the Crescent Moon Kingdom	Naruto	2006
Shippūden: the Movie	Naruto	2007
Shippūden 2: Bonds	Naruto	2008
Shippūden 3: Inheritors of the Will of Fire	Naruto	2009
Shippūden 4: The Lost Tower	Naruto	2010
Blood Prison	Naruto	2011
Road to Ninja	Naruto	2012
The Last	Naruto	2014
Boruto	Naruto	2015
Nasu: Summer in Andalusia	Nasu	2003
Natsu e no Tobira	Natsu e no Tobira	1981
Nausicaä of the Valley of the Wind	Nausicaä of the Valley of the Wind	1984
Fumoon	Nextworld	1980
My Neighbors the Yamadas	Nono-chan	1999
Ah! My Goddess: The Movie	Oh My Goddess!	2000
Ohayō! Spank	Ohayō! Spank	1982
Ojamanga Yamada-kun	Ojamanga Yamada-kun	1981
Only Yesterday	Omoide Poro Poro	1991
One Piece: The Movie	One Piece	2000
Clockwork Island Adventure	One Piece	2001
Chopper's Kingdom on the Island of Strange Animals	One Piece	2002
Dead End Adventure	One Piece	2003
Curse of the Sacred Sword	One Piece	2004
Baron Omatsuri and the Secret Island	One Piece	2005
The Giant Mechanical Soldier of Karakuri Castle	One Piece	2006
Episode of Alabasta: The Desert Princess and the Pirates	One Piece	2007
Episode of Chopper: Bloom in the Winter, Miracle Sakura	One Piece	2008
Strong World	One Piece	2009
Z	One Piece	2012
Gold	One Piece	2016
Stampede	One Piece	2019
Red	One Piece	2022
Patlabor: The Movie	Patlabor	1989
Patlabor 2: The Movie	Patlabor	1993
WXIII: Patlabor the Movie 3	Patlabor	2002
Phoenix 2772	Phoenix	1980
Karma Chapter	Phoenix	1986
A Time Slip of 10,000 Years: Prime Rose	Prime Rose	1983
Tennis no Ōjisama – Futari no Samurai	The Prince of Tennis	2005
Queen Millennia	Queen Millennia	1982
Eiga Nintama Rantarō	Rakudai Ninja Rantarō	1996
Big Trouble in Nekonron, China	Ranma ½	1991
Nihao, My Concubine	Ranma ½	1992
The Adolescence of Utena	Revolutionary Girl Utena	1999
Ishin Shishi he no Requiem	Rurouni Kenshin	1997
New Kyoto Arc: The Cage of Flames	Rurouni Kenshin	2011
New Kyoto Arc: The Chirps of Light	Rurouni Kenshin	2012
Sailor Moon R	Sailor Moon	1993
Sailor Moon S	Sailor Moon	1994
SuperS	Sailor Moon	1995
Eternal	Sailor Moon	2021
The Legend of the Golden Apple	Saint Seiya	1987
The Heated Battle of the Gods	Saint Seiya	1988
Legend of Crimson Youth	Saint Seiya	1988
Warriors of the Final Holy Battle	Saint Seiya	1989
Heaven Chapter ~ Overture	Saint Seiya	2004
Legend of Sanctuary	Saint Seiya	2014
Saint Young Men	Saint Young Men	2013
Sakigake!! Otokojuku	Sakigake!! Otokojuku	1988
Keroro Gunsō the Super Movie	Sgt. Frog	2006
Keroro Gunso the Super Movie 2: The Deep Sea Princess	Sgt. Frog	2007
Keroro Gunso the Super Movie 3: Keroro vs. Keroro Great Sky Duel	Sgt. Frog	2008
Keroro Gunso the Super Movie 4: Gekishin Dragon Warriors	Sgt. Frog	2009
Keroro Gunso the Super Movie: Creation! Ultimate Keroro, Wonder Space-Time Island	Sgt. Frog	2010
New Theatrical Movie Sgt. Frog: Upon Revival, Immediately Facing the Threat of Earth's Destruction!	Sgt. Frog	2026
Miss Hokusai	Sarusuberi	2015
Sekai-ichi Hatsukoi: Yokozawa Takafumi no Baai	Sekai-ichi Hatsukoi	2014
The Siamese Cat – First Mission	The Siamese Cat	2001
A Silent Voice	A Silent Voice	2016
Alakazam the Great	Son-Goku the Monkey	1960
The Tezuka Osamu Story: I Am Son-goku	Son-Goku the Monkey	1989
My Son Goku	Son-Goku the Monkey	2003
Heaven's Lost Property the Movie: The Angeloid of Clockwork	Sora no Otoshimono	2011
Sora no Otoshimono Final: Eternal My Master	Sora no Otoshimono	2014
Mystery of the Arcadia	Space Pirate Captain Harlock	1978
Arcadia of My Youth	Space Pirate Captain Harlock	1982
Harlock: Space Pirate	Space Pirate Captain Harlock	2013
Spriggan	Spriggan	1998
Star of the Giants	Star of the Giants	1982
Sotsugyō Shashin Dai-1-bu -Kizashi-	Tamayura	2015
Sotsugyō Shashin Dai-2-bu -Hibiki-	Tamayura	2015
Tamayura 3	Tamayura	2015
Tamayura 4	Tamayura	2016
Tekkonkinkreet	Tekkonkinkreet	2006
The Prince of Devil Island: The Three-Eyed One	The Three-Eyed One	1985
Ashita no Joe	Tomorrow's Joe	1980
Ashita no Joe 2	Tomorrow's Joe	1981
Toward the Terra	Toward the Terra	1980
Tatakae!! Ramenman the Movie	Tatakae!! Ramenman	1988
Tetsujin Nijūhachi-gō: Hakuchū no Zangetsu	Tetsujin 28-go	2007
They Were Eleven	They Were Eleven	1986
Sebangō no Nai Ace	Touch	1986
Sayonara no Okurimono	Touch	1986
Kimi ga Tōri Sugita Ato ni	Touch	1987
Miss Lonely Yesterday	Touch	1998
Cross Road	Touch	2001
The Fantastic Adventures of Unico	Unico	1981
Unico in the Island of Magic	Unico	1983
Only You	Urusei Yatsura	1983
Beautiful Dreamer	Urusei Yatsura	1984
Remember My Love	Urusei Yatsura	1985
Lum the Forever	Urusei Yatsura	1986
The Final Chapter	Urusei Yatsura	1988
Always My Darling	Urusei Yatsura	1991
Wata no Kunihoshi	Wata no Kunihoshi	1984
The Wind Rises	The Wind Rises	2013
X	X	1996
Yawara!: Go Get 'Em, Wimpy Kids!!	Yawara!	1992
Yawara! Special – I've Always Been About You...	Yawara!	1996
Yakyū-kyō no Uta: Kita no Ōkami, Minami no Tora	Yakyū-kyō no Uta	1979
You're Under Arrest: The Movie	You're Under Arrest	1999
Yu-Gi-Oh!	Yu-Gi-Oh!	1999
Yu-Gi-Oh! The Movie: Pyramid of Light	Yu-Gi-Oh!	2004
The Dark Side of Dimensions	Yu-Gi-Oh!	2016
Bonds Beyond Time	Yu-Gi-Oh!	2010
YuYu Hakusho	YuYu Hakusho	1993
Underworld Carnage Chapter – Bonds of Fire	YuYu Hakusho	1994

=== Live action ===
Film	Manga	Year
009-1: The End of the Beginning	009-1	2013
10Dance	10Dance	2025
20th Century Boys Dai 1 Shō Owari no Hajimari	20th Century Boys	2008
20th Century Boys Dai 2 Shō Saigo no Kibō	20th Century Boys	2009
20th Century Boys Saishū Shō Bokura no Hata	20th Century Boys	2009
8 Man Has Returned	8 Man	1987
8 Man – For All the Lonely Nights	1992	
Abashiri Ikka: The Movie	The Abashiri Family	2009
Afro Tanaka	Afro Tanaka	2012
A Homansu	A Homansu	1986
Ai Ore!	Ai Ore!	2012
Ai to Makoto	Ai to Makoto	1974
Zoku: Ai to Makoto	Ai to Makoto	1975
Kanketsuhen	Ai to Makoto	1976
For Love's Sake	Ai to Makoto	2012
Tamami: The Baby's Curse	Akanbo Shojo	2008
Akira No. 2	Akira No. 2	2014
The Virgin Psychics	All Esper Dayo!	2015
Tenshi	Angel Nest	2006
Anonymous Noise	Anonymous Noise	2017
Aozora Yell	Aozora Yell	2016
Arcana	Arcana	2013
Assassination Classroom	Assassination Classroom	2015
Assassination Classroom: Graduation	Assassination Classroom	2016
Attack on Titan	Attack on Titan	2015
Attack on Titan: End of the World	Attack on Titan	2015
Azumi	Azumi	2003
Azumi 2: Death or Love	Azumi	2005
Bad Boys	Bad Boys	2011
Bakugyaku Familia	Bakugyaku Familia	2012
Bakuman	Bakuman	2015
Barefoot Gen	Barefoot Gen	1976
Explosion of Tears	Barefoot Gen	1977
Battle of Hiroshima	Barefoot Gen	1980
Bataashi Kingyo	Bataashi Kingyo	1990
Be-Bop High School	Be-Bop High School	1985
Be-Bop High School: Kōkō Yotarō Aika	Be-Bop High School	1986
Be-Bop High School: Kōkō Yotarō Kōshinkyoku	Be-Bop High School	1987
Be-Bop High School: Kōkō Yotarō Kyōsō-kyoku	Be-Bop High School	1987
Be-Bop High School: Kōkō Yotarō Ondo	Be-Bop High School	1988
Be-Bop High School: Kōkō Yotarō Kanketsu-hen	Be-Bop High School	1988
Be-Bop High School	Be-Bop High School	1994
BECK	BECK	2010
Black Butler	Black Butler	2014
The Visitor in the Eye	Black Jack	1977
Black Jack	Black Jack	1996
Black Jack 2: Pinoko, I Love You	Black Jack	1996
Black Jack 3: The Two Doctors of Darkness	Black Jack	1996
Black Jack	Black Jack	2000
Black Jack II	Black Jack	2000
Black Jack III	Black Jack	2001
Blade of the Immortal	Blade of the Immortal	2017
Bleach	BLEACH	2018
Blue Period	Blue Period	2024
Blue Spring Ride	Blue Spring Ride	2014
I Give My First Love to You	Boku wa Imōto ni Koi o Suru	2009
Boys on the Run	Boys on the Run	2010
Boys Over Flowers	Boys Over Flowers	1995
Chihayafuru Part 1	Chihayafuru	2016
Chihayafuru: Shimo no Ku	Chihayafuru	2016
Chihayafuru Part 3	Chihayafuru	2018
The Torture Club	Chotto Kawaii Aian Meiden	2014
Circuit no Ōkami	Circuit no Ōkami	1977
City Hunter	City Hunter	2024
Crows Zero	Crows	2007
Crows Zero 2	Crows	2009
Crows Explode	Crows	2014
Cutie Honey	Cutie Honey	2004
Cutie Honey: Tears	Cutie Honey	2016
Daily Lives of High School Boys	Daily Lives of High School Boys	2013
Death Note	Death Note	2006
Death Note 2: The Last Name	Death Note	2006
L: Change the World	Death Note	2008
Death Note: Light Up the New World	Death Note	2016
Dororo	Dororo	2007
Eko Eko Azarak: Wizard of Darkness	Eko Eko Azarak	1995
Eko Eko Azarak II: Birth of the Wizard	Eko Eko Azarak	1995
Eko Eko Azarak III: Misa The Dark Angel	Eko Eko Azarak	1998
Eko Eko Azarak IV: Awakening	Eko Eko Azarak	2001
Eko Eko Azarak: R-page	Eko Eko Azarak	2006
Eko Eko Azarak: B-page	Eko Eko Azarak	2006
Erased	Erased	2016
From Kobe	From Kobe	2015
Fullmetal Alchemist	Fullmetal Alchemist	2017
A Boy and His Samurai	Fushigi no Kuni no Yasubei	2010
Futari Ecchi	Futari Ecchi	2011
Futari H: Second Kiss	Futari Ecchi	2011
Futari Ecchi: Triple Love	Futari Ecchi	2012
Futari Ecchi: Love Forever	Futari Ecchi	2012
Gaki Rock	Gaki Rock	2014
GANTZ	Gantz	2011
GANTZ: Perfect Answer	Gantz	2011
Garōden	Garōden	1995
GeGeGe no Kitarō	GeGeGe no Kitarō	2007
Tsuge Yoshiharu World: Gensenkan Shujin	Gensenkan Shujin	1993
Gin Tama	Gin Tama	2017
Yakuza Weapon	Gokudô Heiki	2011
Golden Kamuy	Golden Kamuy	2024
Great Teacher Onizuka	Great Teacher Onizuka	1999
Guinea Pig 2: Flower of Flesh and Blood	Guinea Pig: Devil's Experiment	1985
Guinea Pig 6: Mermaid in a Manhole	Guinea Pig: Devil's Experiment	1988
Haikara-san ga Tōru	Haikara-san ga Tōru	1987
Hana no Asuka-gumi!	Hana no Asuka-gumi!	1988
Hana no Asuka-gumi! Neo	Hana no Asuka-gumi!	2009
Harenchi Gakuen	Harenchi Gakuen	1970
Harenchi Gakuen: Shintai Kensa no Maki	Harenchi Gakuen	1970
Harenchi Gakuen: Tackle Kiss no Maki	Harenchi Gakuen	1970
Shin Harenchi Gakuen	Harenchi Gakuen	1971
Heisei Harenchi Gakuen	Harenchi Gakuen	1996
Helter Skelter	Helter Skelter	2012
Heroine Shikkaku	Heroine Shikkaku	2015
Hibi Rock	Hibi Rock	2014
Higanjima	Higanjima	2016
High School Debut	High School Debut	2011
Himitsu no Akko-chan	Himitsu no Akko-chan	2012
Himizu	Himizu	2011
Daytime Shooting Star	Hirunaka no Ryuusei	2017
Hitsuji no Ki	Hitsuji no Ki	2018
Honey and Clover	Honey and Clover	2006
Hoshi no Furumachi	Hoshi no Furumachi	2011
Hotaru no Hikari	Hotaru no Hikari	2012
Hot Road	Hot Road	2014
Hōzuki-san Chi no Aneki	Hōzuki-san Chi no Aneki	2014
I Am a Hero	I Am a Hero	2016
Ibitsu	Ibitsu	2013
Ichi the Killer	Ichi the Killer	2001
Igano Kabamaru	Igano Kabamaru	1983
I'll Give It My All... Tomorrow	I'll Give It My All... Tomorrow	2013
Ecchi o Nerae! Inu-Neko]]	Inu-Neko	2009
Inuyashiki	Inuyashiki	2018
Itazura na Kiss the Movie ~High School-Hen~	Itazura na Kiss	2016
Itazura na Kiss The Movie Part 2 Campus-Hen	Itazura na Kiss	2016
Ikigami	Ikigami: The Ultimate Limit	2008
Happily Ever After	Jigyaku no Uta	2007
JoJo's Bizarre Adventure: Diamond Is Unbreakable Chapter I	JoJo's Bizarre Adventure	2017
Jōkyō Monogatari	Jōkyō Monogatari	2013
The Kabocha Wine - Another	The Kabocha Wine	2007
Kagen no Tsuki	Kagen no Tsuki	2004
Kaguya-sama: Love Is War	Kaguya-sama: Love is War	2019
Kaguya-sama Final: Love Is War	Kaguya-sama: Love is War	2021
Kaiji	Kaiji	2009
Kaiji 2	Kaiji	2011
Kaiji: Final Game	Kaiji	2020
Kakashi	Kakashi	2001
Kakegurui – Compulsive Gambler	Kakegurui – Compulsive Gambler	2019
Gekijouban Kamen Teacher	Kamen Teacher	2014
God's Left Hand, Devil's Right Hand	Kami no Hidarite, Akuma no Migite	2006
Kami Voice	Kami Voice	2011
Kami-sama no Iu Toori	Kami-sama no Iu Toori	2014
Jinuyo Saraba: Kamuroba Mura e	Kamurobamura-e	2015
Kanojo wa Uso o Aishisugiteru	Kanojo wa Uso o Aishisugiteru	2013
Karate Baka Ichidai	Karate for Life	1977
Kōdai-ke no Hitobito	Kōdai-ke no Hitobito	2016
Koi wa Ameagari no You ni	Koi wa Ameagari no You ni	2018
Kekko Kamen	Kekko Kamen	1991
Kekko Kamen 2: We'll Be Back...	Kekko Kamen	1992
Kekko Kamen 3 (a.k.a. Kekko Kamen in Love)	Kekko Kamen	1993
Mask of Kekko	Kekko Kamen	2004
Kekko Kamen: The MGF Strikes Back	Kekko Kamen	2004
Kekko Kamen Returns	Kekko Kamen	2004
Kekko Kamen Surprise	Kekko Kamen	2004
Kekko Kamen Royale	Kekko Kamen	2007
Kekko Kamen Premium	Kekko Kamen	2007
Kekko Kamen Forever	Kekko Kamen	2007
Kimi ni Todoke	Kimi ni Todoke	2010
Shanghai Mermaid Legend Murder Case	Kindaichi Shounen no Jikenbo	1997
Kin Kyori Renai	Kin Kyori Renai	2014
Kirin	Kirin	2011
Kisei Jūi Suzune	Kisei Jūi Suzune	2011
Kiyoku Yawaku	Kiyoku Yawaku	2013
Kizudarake no Akuma	Kizudarake no Akuma	2017
Kochira Katsushika-ku Kameari Koen-mae Hashutsujo film]]	Kochira Katsushika-ku Kameari Koen-mae Hashutsujo	1977
Kochikame – The Movie: Save the Kachidiki Bridge!]]	Kochira Katsushika-ku Kameari Koen-mae Hashutsujo	2011
A Perfect Day for Love Letters	Koibumi Biyori	2004
Otakus in Love	Koi no Mon	2004
Kurosaki-kun no Iinari ni Nante Naranai	Kurosaki-kun no Iinari ni Nante Naranai	2016
Air Doll	Kuuki Ningyo	2009
Kyō Kara Ore Wa!!	Kyō Kara Ore Wa!!	1994
Kyō Kara Ore Wa!!	Kyō Kara Ore Wa!!	2020
Kyō, Koi o Hajimemasu	Kyō, Koi o Hajimemasu	2012
Kyō no Kira-kun	Kyō no Kira-kun	2017
Big Tits Zombie	Kyonyū Dragon	2010
Premonition	Kyōfu Shinbun	2004
Hentai Kamen	Kyūkyoku!! Hentai Kamen	2013
Hentai Kamen: Abnormal Crisis	Kyūkyoku!! Hentai Kamen	2016
Lady Snowblood	Lady Snowblood	1973
Lady Snowblood: Love Song of Vengeance	Lady Snowblood	1974
Laughing Under the Clouds	Laughing Under the Clouds	2018
Kamui Gaiden	The Legend of Kamui: The Island of Sugaru	2009
L DK	L DK	2014
Liar Game: The Final Stage	Liar Game	2010
Liar Game: Reborn	Liar Game	2012
Life Is Dead	Life Is Dead	2012
Little Forest: Summer/Autumn	Little Forest	2014
Little Forest: Winter/Spring	Little Forest	2015
Sword of Vengeance	Lone Wolf and Cub	1972
Baby Cart at the River Styx	Lone Wolf and Cub	1972
Baby Cart to Hades	Lone Wolf and Cub	1972
Baby Cart in Peril	Lone Wolf and Cub	1972
Baby Cart in the Land of Demons	Lone Wolf and Cub	1973
White Heaven in Hell	Lone Wolf and Cub	1974
Shogun Assassin	Lone Wolf and Cub	1980
Love and Lies	Love and Lies	2017
Lovely Complex	Lovely Complex	2006
Lovers' Kiss	Lovers' Kiss	2003
Kakera: A Piece of Our Life	Love Vibes	2010
Lupin III: Strange Psychokinetic Strategy	Lupin the Third	1974
Lupin the 3rd	Lupin the Third	2014
Maestro!	Maestro!	2015
MAI CHAN'S Daily Life: THE MOVIE	Mai-Chan's Daily Life	2014
Maison Ikkoku	Maison Ikkoku	1986
March Comes in like a Lion: Part 1	March Comes in like a Lion	2017
March Comes in like a Lion: Part 2	March Comes in like a Lion	2017
Mars: Tada, Kimi wo Aishiteru	Mars	2016
Jisshaban: Maicching Machiko-sensei	Miss Machiko	2003
Maicching Machiko-sensei: Let's! Rinkai Gakkō	Miss Machiko	2003
Maicching Machiko-sensei the Movie: Oh! Cosplay Dai Sakusen	Miss Machiko	2004
Maicching Machiko! Begins	Miss Machiko	2005
Maicching Machiko-sensei: Toudai o Juken Dai Sakusen!!	Miss Machiko	2006
Maicching Machiko-sensei: Go! Go!!! Katei Hōmon!!	Miss Machiko	2007
Maicching Machiko-sensei: Viva! Momoka-chan!	Miss Machiko	2008
Maicching Machiko-sensei: Muteki no Oppai banchō Tai Man Shōbu de, Maitchingu	Miss Machiko	2009
Midori	Mr. Arashi's Amazing Freak Show	2016
The Mole Song: Undercover Agent Reiji	Mogura no Uta	2013
Moteki	Moteki	2011
Museum	Museum	2016
Mushishi	Mushishi	2007
MW	MW	2009
My Love Story!!	My Love Story!!	2015
Nana	Nana	2005
Nana 2	Nana	2006
Nana to Kaoru	Nana to Kaoru	2011
Nana to Kaoru: Chapter 2	Nana to Kaoru	2012
The Promised Neverland	The Promised Neverland	2020
Nigakute Amai	Nigakute Amai	2016
Nodame Cantabile Saishū Gakushō Zen-Pen	Nodame Cantabile	2009
Nodame Cantabile Saishū Gakushō Kou-Hen	Nodame Cantabile	2010
Nōnai Poison Berry	Nōnai Poison Berry	2015
Nonchan Noriben	Nonchan Noriben	2009
Nozoki Ana	Nozoki Ana	2014
Nozomi Witches	Nozomi Witches	1990
Oboreru Knife	Oboreru Knife	2016
Oira Sukeban: Kessen! Pansutō	Oira Sukeban	1992
Oira Sukeban (Sukeban Boy)	Oira Sukeban	2006
Oishinbo	Oishinbo	1996
Onna no Ana	Onna no Ana	2014
One Week Friends	One Week Friends	2017
Ōoku: The Inner Chambers	Ōoku: The Inner Chambers	2010
Ōoku: Emonnosuke Tsunayoshi Hen	Ōoku: The Inner Chambers	2012
Orange	Orange	2015
Orochi	Orochi: Blood	2008
Osu!! Karate Bu	Osu!! Karate Bu	1990
Otoko no Isshō	Otoko no Isshō	2014
Ouran High School Host Club	Ouran High School Host Club	2012
P and JK	P and JK	2017
Paradise Kiss	Paradise Kiss	2011
Parasyte: Part 1	Parasyte	2014
Parasyte: Part 2	Parasyte	2015
Peach Girl	Peach Girl	2017
Pecoross' Mother and Her Days	Pekorosu no Haha ni Ai ni Iku	2013
Hi no Tori	Phoenix	1978
Piece of Cake	Piece of Cake	2015
Ping Pong	Ping Pong	2002
Pumpkin and Mayonnaise	Pumpkin and Mayonnaise	2017
The Prince of Tennis	The Prince of Tennis	2006
Prophecy	Yokokuhan	2015
Ranma ½: Live Action Special	Ranma ½	2011
Real Girl	Real Girl	2018
ReLIFE	ReLIFE	2017
Romance of Darkness	Romance of Darkness	2006
Rurouni Kenshin	Rurouni Kenshin	2012
Rurouni Kenshin: Kyoto Taika-hen	Rurouni Kenshin	2014
Rurouni Kenshin: Densetsu no Saigo-hen	Rurouni Kenshin	2014
Rurouni Kenshin: The Final	Rurouni Kenshin	2021
Rurouni Kenshin: The Beginning	Rurouni Kenshin	2021
Saikin, Imōto no Yōsu ga Chotto Okaishiin Da Ga.	Saikin, Imōto no Yōsu ga Chotto Okaishiin Da Ga.	2014
Saki	Saki	2017
Sakura no Sono	Sakura no Sono	1990
Sakura no Sono	Sakura no Sono	2008
Sakuran	Sakuran	2007
Salaryman Kintarō	Salaryman Kintarō	1999
Saru Lock	Saru Lock	2010
Say "I love you".	Say "I love you".	2014
School-Live!	School-Live!	2019
The End of the World and the Cat's Disappearance	Sekai no Owari no Izukoneko	2015
Fūryū Kokkei-tan: Sennin Buraku	Sennin Buraku	1961
Senpai to Kanojo	Senpai to Kanojo	2015
Shark Skin Man and Peach Hip Girl	Shark Skin Man and Peach Hip Girl	2009
Shinjuku Swan	Shinjuku Swan	2015
Setoutsumi	Setoutsumi	2016
Shindo	Shindo	2007
Sky High	Skyhigh	2003
Smuggler	Smuggler	2011
SS	SS	2008
Hoshi Mamoru Inu	Stargazing Dog	2011
Strobe Edge	Strobe Edge	2015
Sue, Mai & Sawa: Righting the Girl Ship	Su-chan	2012
Sukeban Deka The Movie	Sukeban Deka	1987
Sukeban Deka the Movie 2: Counter-Attack from the Kazama Sisters	Sukeban Deka	1988
Sukimasuki	Sukimasuki	2015
Everest: Kamigami no Itadaki	The Summit of the Gods	2016
Sundome	Sundome	2007
Sundome 2	Sundome	2008
Sundome 3	Sundome	2008
Sundome 4: The Final	Sundome	2009
Terra Formars	Terra Formars	2016
Tokyo Daigaku Monogatari	Tokyo Daigaku Monogatari	2006
Tokyo Ghoul	Tokyo Ghoul	2017
Tomie Unlimited	Tomie	2011
Usagi Drop	Usagi Drop	2011
Yo-Yo Girl Cop	Sukeban Deka	2006
Sweet Poolside	Sweet Poolside	2014
Tokyo Babylon 1999	Tokyo Babylon	1993
Angel Guts: High School Co-Ed	Tenshi no Harawata	1978
Red Classroom	Tenshi no Harawata	1979
Nami	Tenshi no Harawata	1979
Red Porno	Tenshi no Harawata	1981
Rouge	Tenshi no Harawata	1984
Red Rope – "Until I Expire"	Tenshi no Harawata	1987
Red Vertigo	Tenshi no Harawata	1988
Red Lightning	Tenshi no Harawata	1994
Night Is Falling Again	Tenshi no Harawata	1994
Tetsujin 28: The Movie	Tetsujin 28-go	2005
Thermae Romae	Thermae Romae	2012
Thermae Romae II	Thermae Romae	2014
They Were Eleven	They Were Eleven	1977
Summer Vacation 1999	Thomas no Shinzō	1988
Tokyo Tribe	Tokyo Tribes	2014
Tokyo Zombie	Tokyo Zombie	2005
Tomodachi Game Gekijoban	Tomodachi Game	2017
Touch	Touch	1987
Touch	Touch	2005
Yunagi City, Sakura Country	Town of Evening Calm, Country of Cherry Blossoms	2007
Tsukuroi Tatsu Hito	Tsukuroi Tatsu Hito	2015
Tsure ga Utsu ni Narimashite	Tsure ga Utsu ni Narimashite	2011
Uchū Kyōdai	Uchū Kyōdai	2012
Our Little Sister	Umimachi Diary	2015
Umizaru	Umizaru	2004
Limit of Love: Umizaru	Umizaru	2006
Brave Hearts: Umizaru	Umizaru	2012
Undercurrent	Undercurrent	2023
Usogui	Usogui	2022
Ushijima the Loan Shark	Ushijima the Loan Shark	2012
Ushijima the Loan Shark 2	Ushijima the Loan Shark	2014
Usotsuki Paradox	Usotsuki Paradox	2013
Uzumaki	Uzumaki	2000
Wangan Midnight	Wangan Midnight	1991
Wangan Midnight II	Wangan Midnight	1993
Wangan Midnight III	Wangan Midnight	1993
Wangan Midnight 4	Wangan Midnight	1993
Wangan Midnight Special Director's Cut Complete Edition	Wangan Midnight	1994
Wangan Midnight Final: GT-R Legend – Act 1	Wangan Midnight	1994
Wangan Midnight Final: GT-R Legend – Act 2	Wangan Midnight	1994
Devil GT-R Full Tuning	Wangan Midnight	1994
Showdown! Devil GT-R	Wangan Midnight	1994
Wangan Midnight S30 vs. Gold GT-R – Part I	Wangan Midnight	1998
Wangan Midnight S30 vs. Gold GT-R – Part II	Wangan Midnight	1998
Wangan Midnight Return	Wangan Midnight	2001
Wangan Midnight	Wangan Midnight	2009
Watching Fuckin' TV All Time Makes a Fool	Watching Fuckin' TV All Time Makes a Fool	2006
Bokura ga Ita	We Were There	2012
Wild 7	Wild 7	2011
xxxHolic	xxxHolic	2022
Yawara!	Yawara!	1989
Yakyū-kyō no Uta	Yakyū-kyō no Uta	1979
Your Lie in April	Your Lie in April	2016
Zekkyō Gakkyū	Zekkyō Gakkyū	2013
Zom 100: Bucket List of the Dead	Zom 100: Bucket List of the Dead	2023

== U.S. productions ==
Film	Manga	Year	Type
The Guyver	Bio Booster Armor Guyver	1991	Live action
Guyver: Dark Hero	Bio Booster Armor Guyver	1994	Live action
Fist of the North Star	Fist of the North Star	1995	Live action
Speed Racer	Speed Racer	2008	Live action
Dragonball Evolution	Dragon Ball	2009	Live action
Astro Boy	Astro Boy	2009	Animation
Oldboy	Oldboy	2013	Live action
Edge of Tomorrow	All You Need Is Kill	2014	Live Action
Ghost in the Shell	Ghost in the Shell	2017	Live action
Death Note	Death Note	2017	Live action
Alita: Battle Angel	Battle Angel Alita	2019	Live action
Knights of the Zodiac	Saint Seiya	2023	Live action

== Japanese co-productions and non-Japanese productions ==
Film	Manga	Year	Country	Type
Crying Freeman	Crying Freeman	1995	Canada, France, Japan	Live action
Animal World: Mr. Nobody!	Kaiji	2018	China	Live action
Un ciel radieux	Hare Yuku Sora	2017	France	Live action
A Distant Neighborhood	A Distant Neighborhood	2010	France	Live action
Nicky Larson et le Parfum de Cupidon	City Hunter	2019	France	Live action
Everest: Kamigami no Itadaki	The Summit of the Gods	2021	France	Animation
Lady Oscar	The Rose of Versailles	1979	France, Japan	Live action
City Hunter	City Hunter	1993	Hong Kong	Live-action
The Dragon from Russia	Crying Freeman	1990	Hong Kong	Live action
Killer's Romance	Crying Freeman	1990	Hong Kong	Live action
Mack the Knife	Dr. Kumahige	1995	Hong Kong	Live action
Initial D	Initial D	2005	Hong Kong	Live action
Riki-Oh: The Story of Ricky	Riki-Oh	1991	Hong Kong	Live action
A Battle of Wits	Bokko	2006	Hong Kong, China, Japan, South Korea	Live action
Golgo 13: Assignment Kowloon	Golgo 13	1977	Hong Kong, Japan	Live action
Peacock King	Peacock King	1988	Hong Kong, Japan	Live action
Saga of the Phoenix	Peacock King	1990	Hong Kong, Japan	Live action
Zinda	Oldboy	2006	India	Live action
Golgo 13	Golgo 13	1973	Iran, Japan	Live action
Higanjima	Higanjima	2010	Japan, South Korea	Live action
Tatsumi	A Drifting Life	2011	Singapore	Animation
Antique	Antique Bakery	2008	South Korea	Live action
200 Pounds Beauty	Kanna-san Daiseikō Desu!	2006	South Korea	Live action
Little Forest	Little Forest	2018	South Korea	Live action
Oldboy	Oldboy	2003	South Korea	Live action
You're My Pet	Tramps Like Us	2011	South Korea	Live action

== Highest-grossing manga films worldwide ==
The following is a list of the top 50 highest-grossing Manga films worldwide. The most prominent series is Detective Conan, with eleven of its film adaptations being included. Additionally, Demon Slayer: Kimetsu no Yaiba – The Movie: Infinity Castle ranks as the second highest-grossing traditionally animated film of all time, only behind The Lion King. Dragonball Evolution, Speed Racer, Ghost in the Shell, Alita: Battle Angel, and Animal World are the only non-Japanese films on the list. 2012, 2018, 2019, and 2022 are the most occurring release years, with four films each.

† Background shading indicates films playing in the week commencing 6 November 2026 in theaters around the world.

Rank	Title	Worldwide gross	Year	Ref.
1	Demon Slayer: Kimetsu no Yaiba – The Movie: Infinity Castle	$793,594,078	2025	
2	Demon Slayer: Kimetsu no Yaiba – The Movie: Mugen Train	$515,417,627	2020	
3	Your Name	$409,225,633	2016	
4	Alita: Battle Angel	$404,980,543	2019	
5	The First Slam Dunk	$279,045,965	2022	
6	One Piece Film: Red	$246,570,000	2022	
7	Jujutsu Kaisen 0	$196,290,952	2021	
8	Chainsaw Man – The Movie: Reze Arc	$191,371,853	2025	
9	Stand by Me Doraemon	$183,442,714	2014	
10	Ghost in the Shell	$169,801,921	2017	
11	Detective Conan: One-eyed Flashback	$160,857,704	2025	
12	Chiikawa the Movie: The Secret of the Mermaid Island	$159,000,000	2026	
13	Detective Conan: The Million-dollar Pentagram	$150,008,115	2024	
14	The Wind Rises	$136,864,780	2013	
15	Dragon Ball Super: Broly	$124,000,000	2018	
16	Detective Conan: The Fist of Blue Sapphire	$123,000,323	2019	
17	Detective Conan: Black Iron Submarine	$121,456,706	2023	
18	Detective Conan: Zero the Enforcer	$108,207,000	2018	
19	Detective Conan: The Scarlet Bullet	$102,541,282	2021	
20	Dragon Ball Super: Super Hero	$102,500,000	2022	
21	Haikyu!! The Dumpster Battle	$100,029,921	2024	
22	Umizaru 3: The Last Message	$98,663,381	2010	
23	Detective Conan: Fallen Angel of the Highway	$97,815,460	2026	
24	Spy × Family Code: White	$95,792,835	2023	
25	One Piece: Stampede	$94,000,000	2019	
26	Speed Racer	$93,945,766	2008	
27	Brave Hearts: Umizaru	$91,884,352	2012	
28	Rookies: Graduation	$88,055,243	2012	
29	Nodame Cantabile: The Movie II	$86,192,740	2010	
30	One Piece Film: Z	$84,936,585	2012	(Note: One Piece: Film Z: Japan – ¥6.87 billion (US$82.3 million) (2012); Hong Kong & Taiwan – $1,382,211; Philippines, Singapore, Thailand – $681,794; South Korea – ₩626,891,000)
31	Doraemon: Nobita's Treasure Island	$80,920,916	2018	
32	Thermae Romae	$75,387,554	2012	
33	Animal World	$74,922,830	2018	
34	Detective Conan: The Bride of Halloween	$72,699,093	2022	
35	Hana yori Dango Final: The Movie	$72,243,609	2008	
36	Stand by Me Doraemon 2	$66,606,471	2020	
37	Detective Conan: The Darkest Nightmare	$66,265,957	2016	
38	One Piece Film: Gold	$66,207,073	2016	
39	Doraemon: Nobita's Chronicle of the Moon Exploration	$65,406,606	2019	
40	The Cat Returns	$65,000,000	2002	
41	Detective Conan: The Crimson Love Letter	$63,147,576	2017	
42	Dragon Ball Z: Resurrection 'F'	$61,768,190	2015	
43	From Up on Poppy Hill	$61,487,846	2011	
44	Doraemon: Nobita's Great Adventure in the Antarctic Kachi Kochi	$61,405,659	2017	
45	Limit of Love: Umizaru	$60,602,690	2006	
46	Demon Slayer: Kimetsu no Yaiba – To the Swordsmith Village	$59,554,259	2023	
47	Dragonball Evolution	$56,511,457	2009	
48	Kingdom 4: Return of the Great General	$54,114,815	2024	
49	Case Closed: Sunflowers of Inferno	$52,920,296	2015	
50	Rurouni Kenshin: Kyoto Inferno	$52,696,176	2014	

== See also ==
- List of films based on English-language comics
- List of films based on French-language comics

Also related:

- List of fiction works made into feature films, the other popular source for Japanese films
- List of films based on comic strips
- List of comic-based films directed by women
- List of films based on television programs, features anime that appeared as TV series
