= Barefoot Gen (disambiguation) =

Barefoot Gen is a Japanese manga series by Keiji Nakazawa.

Barefoot Gen may also refer to:

- Barefoot Gen (1976 film), the first film based on the manga
  - Barefoot Gen: Explosion of Tears, a 1977 sequel also directed by Tengo Yamada
  - Barefoot Gen Part 3: Battle of Hiroshima, a 1980 sequel also directed by Tengo Yamada
- Barefoot Gen (1983 film), a 1983 animated film loosely based on the manga
  - Barefoot Gen 2, the 1986 sequel
- Barefoot Gen (TV series), a 2007 Japanese television special based on the manga
