= Anarchy Comics =

Underground comics series

- Cover to Anarchy Comics issue 1. Art by Jay Kinney.

Publication information
- Publisher: Last Gasp
- Schedule: Irregular
- Format: Ongoing series
- Genre: Anarchist, historical, humor/comedy, philosophical, political
- Publication date: 1978 – 1987
- No. of issues: 4

Creative team
- Created by: Jay Kinney
- Artist(s): Various (see Contributors sub-section)
- Editor(s): Jay Kinney and Paul Mavrides

Anarchy Comics is a series of underground comic books published by Last Gasp between 1978 and 1987, as part of the underground comix subculture of the era. Edited by Jay Kinney (#1-3) and Paul Mavrides (#4), regular contributors to Anarchy Comics included Melinda Gebbie, Clifford Harper, and Spain Rodriguez, as well as Kinney and Mavrides. (Kinney, Mavrides, and Rodriguez had been noted for "adding new dimensions to the political comic" in the underground comix press of the 1970s and '80s.)

== Publication history ==
A total of four issues of Anarchy Comics were published between 1978 and 1987, with individual issues appearing in 1978, 1979, 1981, and 1987. Each issue of Anarchy Comics was created by an international cast of anarchist or sympathetic contributors. Each issue included a mixture of fiction, history, commentary, and artwork, with wide ranges in style and format.

Only the first issue remains in print. A collected edition titled Anarchy Comics: The Complete Collection (ISBN 9781604865318) was published in December 2012 by PM Press.

=== Contributors ===
Each issue of Anarchy Comics showcased an international cast of artists who identified as anarchists or nonsectarian socialists. An example of this is Spain Rodriguez, a Marxist, who was considered of "sufficient libertarian bent" to be included.

==== List of contributors ====
The following is a list of each contributor in alphabetical order.

- Bertolt Brecht, source of text (issue No. 2)
- J.R. Burnham, contributing artist (issue No. 1)
- Guy Colwell, contributing artist (issue No. 3)
- Adam Cornford, associate editor, translator (issue No. 3)
- R. Diggs, contributing artist (issue No. 4)
- Norman Dog, contributing artist (issue No. 4)
- Épistolier, contributing artist (issue No. 1-3)
- Matt Feazell, contributing artist (issue No. 3)
- Melinda Gebbie, contributing artist (issue No. 1-4)
- Clifford Harper, contributing artist (issue No. 1-4)
- Albo Helm, contributing artist (issue No. 3)
- Greg Irons, contributing artist (issue No. 3)
- Jay Kinney, editor (issue No. 1-3); associate editor (issue No. 4); contributing artist (issue No. 1-4)
- Steve Lafler, contributing artist (issue No. 3)
- Dave Lester, contributing artist (issue No. 3)
- Bérangère Lomont, translator (issue No. 1)
- Marion Lydbrooke, contributing artist (issue No. 3)
- Paul Mavrides, associate editor (issue No. 3); editor (issue No. 4); contributing artist (issue No. 1-4)
- Louis Michaelson, translator, (issue No. 2)
- Pepe Moreno, contributing artist (issue No. 3)
- Gary Panter, contributing artist (issue No. 3)
- Benjamen Peret, source of text (issue No. 3)
- Peter Pontiac, contributing artist (issue No. 2, 3)
- Pierre Joseph Proudhon, source of text (issue No. 3)
- Ruby Ray, cover art photography (issue No. 2)
- Hal S. Robins, contributing artist (issue No. 4)
- Spain Rodriguez, contributing artist (issue No. 1-4)
- Donald Rooum, contributing artist (issue No. 3)
- Sharon Rudahl, contributing artist (issue No. 2, 3)
- Gerhard Seyfried, contributing artist (issue No. 1, 3)
- Gilbert Shelton, contributing artist (issue No. 1)
- Steve Stiles, contributing artist (issue No. 2)
- M. Trublin, contributing artist (issue No. 2, 3)
- Volny, contributing artist (issue No. 1)
- Byron Werner, contributing artist (issue No. 4)
- S. Zorca, writer (issue No. 4)

== Themes ==
=== Anarchism ===
All of the work in this issue has been inspired by - or based on - anarchist ideas and history. As it becomes increasingly clear that the real 'terrorists' are not a few isolated leftists but are the governments and corporations of this world who hold us hostage with their armaments, militaries & intelligence activities, anarchism becomes more & more relevant!

— Jay Kinney,
Anarchy Comics No. 1 introduction. (1978)

Overtly anarchist in its bent, all content included was based on anarchist philosophy and history. The humor of each anthology was satirical in nature, mocking both mainstream culture as well as traditional leftist ideas of revolution.

=== Punk rock ===
Roger Sabin, an English historian of comics and subculture, noted a number of connections between the comic and the punk rock subculture of the '70s, suggesting that Jay Kinney "clearly hoped to pick up a share of the punk market with this very political comic." The covers of issues No.2 and No.3 both feature archetypal "punk" characters, and issue No. 2 features the short comic "Kultur Documents", a punk rock parody of Archie Comics. Sabin also analyzes "Too Real", Jay Kinney's short comic from the first issue, as being jointly inspired by a combination of Situationist and punk rock imagery. Sabin noted that many of the comics didn't have any relationship to Punk culture, but thought that the comic may have introduced radical ideas to a generation of new, young punks.

== Issues ==
- Anarchy Comics, no. 1 (September 1978). Last Gasp.
  - "Too Real" by Jay Kinney
  - "Nestor Makhno" by Spain Rodriguez (originally published in T.R.A.; 1976)
  - "Smarmy Comics" by Jay Kinney
  - "The Quilting Bee" by Melinda Gebbie
  - "Blood and Sky" by Spain Rodriguez
  - "Gilbert Shelton's Advanced International Motoring Tips" by Gilbert Shelton
  - "Liberty Through The Ages" by Epistolier and Volny, with translation by Berangere Lomont (originally published in L'Echo Des Savanes No.29; 1977)
  - "What's The Difference" by J.R. Burnham
  - "Owd Nancy's Petticoat" by Clifford Harper
  - "Safehouse" by Dohrn
  - "On Contradiction" by M. Tsetung
  - "Today's Rhetoric" by 'Spud' Silber
  - "Some Straight Talk About Anarchy" by Paul Mavrides
- Anarchy Comics, no. 2 (December 1979). Last Gasp.
- Anarchy Comics, no. 3 (July 1981). Last Gasp.
- Anarchy Comics, no. 4 (1987). Last Gasp.

== See also ==
- Anarchism and the arts
- Anarky — DC Comics supervillain
- Leonard Rifas — cartoonist, editor, and publisher focused on similar themes
- Trashman — comics character with Marxist-anarchist overtones, created by Spain Rodriguez
