= Barefoot Gen (TV series) =

2007 Japanese television special

- Based on: Barefoot Gen by Keiji Nakazawa
- Screenplay by: Ryoichi Kimiduka
- Directed by: Masaki Nishiura; Shosuke Murakami
- Starring: Ren Kobayashi; Kiichi Nakai; Yuriko Ishida; Akiyoshi Nakao; Yuki Imai; Kenichi Yajima; Takeshi Masu; Sakura; Susumu Kobayashi; Yōji Tanaka; Hiroki Narimiya; Ryo; Mitsuru Hirata; Kanako Fukaura
- Theme music composer: Naoki Satō
- Country of origin: Japan
- Original language: Japanese
- No. of episodes: 2

Production
- Producers: Jun Masumoto; Hisao Ogura
- Running time: 204 minutes

Original release
- Network: Fuji Television
- Release: August 10 – August 11, 2007

Barefoot Gen (はだしのゲン, Hadashi no Gen) is a two-part Japanese television special based on the manga of the same name by Keiji Nakazawa.

== Plot ==
During the end of the war in Hiroshima, people in Japan were facing food shortages, and air bombing day and night, bur the government and its military powers, still continued the hopeless situation, and called young people to send them to battlefields. People, however, received letters that those young people had been lost. At that time in Japan, Daikichi was working as a picture drawer of Japanese footwear Geta. With his wife Kimie, Daikichi worked hard to raise their four little children.

Koji, the eldest brother, was nice and kind to his family. Eiko, the eldest sister, was weak in health, but doing daily chores to help her family. Gen, the naughty but cheerful kid, was also nice to his family. The youngest boy Shinji was a pampered child. Kimie was pregnant, so they were going to have a new family member. When it is time to harvest the wheat from the fields outside of town, the children look forward to making bread and noodles to eat. Daikichi always said to his children, "Grow up as strong as the wheat".

== Cast ==
- Ren Kobayashi as Gen Nakaoka, the main protagonist
  - Gaku Yamamoto as an elderly Gen Nakaoka, the narrator
- Kiichi Nakai as Daikichi Nakaoka, Gen's father
- Yuriko Ishida as Kimie Nakaoka, Gen's mother
- Akiyoshi Nakao as Koji Nakaoka, Gen's elder brother
- Asuka Ono as Eiko Nakaoka, Gen's elder sister
- Yuki Imai as Shinji Nakaoka, Gen's younger brother, and Ryuta Kondo
- TBA as Tomoko Nakaoka, Gen's baby sister
- Masanobu Katsumura as Mr. Pak
- Kenichi Yajima as a chief police officer
- Hiroko Nakajima as Ume
- Isamu Ichikawa as Officer Hamada
- Kanako Fukaura as Hanako Yoshida
- Takeshi Masu as Commander Saeki
- Shinobu Tsuruta as Principal Tanaka
- Hiroshi Okouchi as Mr. Numata
- Sakura as Kikuyo
- Susumu Kobayashi as a doctor
- Takao Toji as a master of the house
- Yōji Tanaka as a military policeman
- Hiroki Narimiya as Seiji Yoshida
- Ryo as Kiyoko Hayashi
- Takehiro Murata as Shinsuke Takura
- Mitsuru Hirata as Dr. Yabe
- B-saku Sato as Eizo Yoshida
- Tokie Hidari as Setsu Hayashi
- Tetta Sugimoto as Kosaku
- Takehiko Ono as Denjiro Samejima
- Taro Yamashita as Tatsuo Hayasi
- Jyura Matsuura as Takeko Hayashi

== Locations ==
- Hiroshima Film Commission
- Saga Pref Film Commission
- Ibaraki Film Commission
- Kagawa Film Commission
- Miroku no Sato in Fukuyama, Hiroshima
- Takeo, Jōsō, AP&PP Takahagi, Ishioka, Mitoyo
- Marugame Basara Map
- TV Shin-Hiroshima TSS TV Shin-Hiroshima
- Saga Television Station Saga TV

== Theme song ==
- "Sen no Kaze ni Natte" ("A Thousand Winds")
  - Sing by Masafumi Akikawa

== DVD and soundtrack ==
DVD and soundtrack were released on January 25, 2008, from Pony Canyon.

== See also ==
- Barefoot Gen
- Barefoot Gen (1976 film)
- Barefoot Gen: Explosion of Tears (1977 film)
- Barefoot Gen Part 3: Battle of Hiroshima (1980 film)
- Barefoot Gen (anime)
- Barefoot Gen 2 (anime)
- Keiji Nakazawa
- Japanese television programs
