= Ruby Ray =

Ruby Ray may refer to:

- Ruby Ray (photographer) (born 1952), American photographer
- Ruby Ray (actress) (1881–after 1973), English stage actress
