= Leonard Rifas =

American cartoonist, critic, editor, and publisher

- Born: April 16, 1951 (age 75)
- Areas: Cartoonist, Editor, Publisher
- Notable works: EduComics; All-Atomic Comics; Corporate Crime

Leonard Rifas (born April 16, 1951) is an American cartoonist, critic, editor, and publisher associated with underground comix, comics journalism, left-wing politics, and the anti-nuclear movement. He is notable for his contributions to the form of minicomics as well as publishing Japanese manga in the United States. Rifas' publishing company, EduComics, operated most actively from 1976 to 1982.

Rifas has written a number of scholarly articles in various journals, on such topics as "the anti-comics movement of the 1950s, the underground comix movement, representations of race, and Korean War comic books."

== Career ==
Rifas' first published work was a self-published minicomic called Quoz, published in 1969. Printed by underground publisher Don Donahue, it is considered one of the first true minicomics. The contents are reprinted in Michael Dowers' Treasury of Mini Comics — Volume One (Fantagraphics Books, Oct. 2013) ISBN 978-1606996577.

In the early 1970s, Rifas contributed comics to the underground anthologies San Francisco Comic Book #1 (Gary Arlington, 1970) and Hee Hee Comics (Company & Sons, 1970), and then put together Gimme, an underground one-shot mostly scripted by Rifas with art by Rifas and a group of other contributors.

Rifas set up EduComics in 1976, ostensibly to publish All-Atomic Comics, an educational comic about "the many dangers of nuclear energy development and operations. The product of two years of work, All-Atomic Comics was scripted by Rifas, with art by himself and a number of other artists, including Melinda Gebbie and Larry Rippee. The comic found great success, with an initial print-run of 10,000 copies (and revised editions released in 1977, 1978, 1979, and 1980). All-Atomic Comics was translated and published in Germany (by a number of different publishers) in the late 1970s.

In 1976, Rifas struck up a relationship with Wisconsin-based publisher Kitchen Sink Press, which, in conjunction with the United States Bicentennial, released his An Army of Principles, about "The History and Philosophy of the American Revolution." The 36-page comic was mostly drawn and entirely inked by Rifas, with some penciling assists by others.

Next, Rifas spearheaded the anthology series Corporate Crime for Kitchen Sink Press, the first issue appearing in 1977 and the second in 1979. Corporate Crime is an early example of comics reportage, with a number of notable contributors, including Greg Irons, Trina Robbins, Harry Driggs, Guy Colwell, Kim Deitch, Justin Green, Jay Kinney, Denis Kitchen, and Larry Gonick.

Meanwhile, Rifas expanded EduComics into a true publisher. From 1978 to 1982, the company released a number of politically oriented educational anthologies (most edited by Rifas) on such topics as motherhood, energy policy, and food production. These anthologies included the work of such underground luminaries as Trina Robbins, Suzy Varty, Joyce Farmer, Robert Crumb, Harry Driggs, Denis Kitchen, Greg Irons, Sharon Rudahl, and Harry S. Robins. The company also published a number of works by Japanese cartoonist Keiji Nakazawa, making Rifas the first American publisher to publish translated manga.

EduComics' second published title was Mama! Dramas, an all-female underground comix anthology about motherhood released in 1978.

1980 was a busy year for EduComics. Leading off was the translation and publication of Keiji Nakazawa's historical manga Barefoot Gen (as Gen of Hiroshima). About Nakazawa's own experiences as a Hiroshima bombing survivor, Gen of Hiroshima was also the "first full-length translation of a manga from Japanese into English to be published in the West." Also appearing that year was the one-shot anthology Energy Comics, about "the risks and rewards of various energy sources," edited by Rifas. The third EduComics publication of 1980 was Food Comix/cs, a flip comic anthology about food injustice, specifically "in the world's food supply and food production industry, as well as the unhealthy dietary choices made by consumers."

In 1982, EduComics published Keiji Nakazawa's I Saw It, the original predecessor of Barefoot Gen. Published in a single volume, Educomics colorized the series and offered lesson plans for bulk orders to aid in using the series in classrooms to help explain the Pacific War to students. Also with bulk orders, an 11 × 17 inch free poster was added for promoting the manga in stores, with endorsements by other manga artists and peace educators.

In 1988, Rifas put together and edited three issues of Itchy Planet, an anthology of political comics and cartoons published by Fantagraphics. Contributors included David Suter, Larry Gonick, Joyce Farmer, Mary Fleener, Dennis Worden, Harry Driggs, Peter Kuper, Joyce Brabner, Seth Tobocman, Spain Rodriguez, Norman Dog, Michael Dougan, and Steve Lafler.

In the 1990s, Rifas transitioned from cartoonist and editor to academic. He earned an M.A. and a Ph.D. in Communications from the University of Washington. His thesis was published in 2021 by McFarland & Company as Korean War Comic Books (ISBN 978-0786443963).

Returning to his creative roots, in 1995 Rifas found time to plot, co-script, and draw Tobacco Comics, a comic for kids about the risks of smoking. Published by David Bedoll/Washington Doctors Ought to Care, the front cover art was by Jim Woodring. In 1999, he used a 3D graphics program to create The Big Picture — Visualizing the Global Economy. Published to support the protests against the World Trade Organization, the comic's characters travel through a landscape that visualizes the world economy.

Rifas teaches at Seattle Central College, having previously been at the University of Washington Bothell.

== Comics bibliography ==
=== EduComics ===
- All-Atomic Comics (Sept. 1976) — script by Rifas with his own art and additional contributions from Peter Weber, Shelby Sampson, Larry Rippee, Kevin Brady, Melinda Gebbie, Roger May, Marc Miyashiro, Moria Wright, Delores Thom, and Ray Kott
  - Translated and published in German:
    - Atomkomix (Bremen: Ulli Jenkins, 1976)
    - U-Comix Extra #11, (Volksverlag, 1977)
    - Atom Comic (Bürgerinitiative Lübeck gegen Kernenergiegefahren, 1978)
    - Atom Comic (Nexus, 1980)
- (editor) Energy Comics (Jan. 1980) — contributors include Denis Kitchen, Joyce Farmer, Greg Irons, Robert Crumb, Sharon Rudahl, Harry Driggs, and Rifas
- (editor) Food Comix/cs (Oct. 1980) — contributors include Harry Driggs, Akira Narita, Robert Crumb, Steve Leialoha, Trina Robbins, Harry S. Robins, and Rifas
- Mama! Dramas (June 1978) — anthology edited by Trina Robbins, with stories from the likes of Robbins, Suzy Varty, and Joyce Farmer
- Gen of Hiroshima (2 issues, Jan. 1980–Apr. 1981) — by Keiji Nakazawa
- I Saw It: The Atomic Bombing of Hiroshima: A Survivor's True Story (Dec. 1982) — by Keiji Nakazawa
- The Big Picture — Visualizing the Global Economy (1999)

=== Work for other publishers ===
As writer/artist, unless otherwise noted

- Quoz (self-published, 1969)
- "Freedom," in San Francisco Comic Book #1 (Gary Arlington, 1970)
- 1-pager, Hee Hee Comics (Company & Sons, 1970)
- Gimme (Head Imports, 1972) — mostly scripted by Rifas with art by Rifas, Nick Ciampi, Bob Garcia, Larry Rippee, Phil Collins, and Charly Price
- An Army of Principles (Kitchen Sink Press, 1976) — written, mostly drawn, and entirely inked by Rifas, with some penciling by Larry Rippee, Moria Wright, Charly Price, and Alice Dubiel
- (editor) Corporate Crime (2 issues, Kitchen Sink Press, 1977 & 1979) — contributors include Greg Irons, Trina Robbins, Harry Driggs, Guy Colwell, Kim Deitch, Justin Green, Jay Kinney, Denis Kitchen, and Larry Gonick
- "T.V. Opiate of the People," in Dope Comix #1 (Kitchen Sink Press, Feb. 1978)
- Food First Comics (Institute for Food and Development Policy, 1982) — cover by Steve Leialoha, short contribution from Larry Rippee
- "A Typical Hippie Dope," in Dope Comix #2 (Kitchen Sink Press, June 1982) — collaboration with Moria Wright Peters and Rusty Wright

== Sources ==
- "Leonard Rifas (USA)". Comiclopedia. Lambiek.
- "Before It's Too Late: An Interview with Leonard Rifas, the Cartoonist/Publisher with a Social Conscience". The Comics Journal. No. 92. Interviewed by Dale Luciano. Aug 1984. pp. 87–109.
