= Fukaura (surname) =

Fukaura (written: 深浦) is a Japanese surname. Notable people with the surname include:

- Kanako Fukaura (深浦 加奈子, 1960–2008), Japanese actress
- Kōichi Fukaura (深浦 康市, born 1972), Japanese shogi player
