= I Saw It =

Manga by Keiji Nakazawa

- Cover of Educomics release of I Saw It.

おれは見た (Ore wa Mita)
- Genre: Anti-war, autobiography
- Manga
- Written by: Keiji Nakazawa
- Published by: Shueisha
- English publisher: NA: Educomics
- Magazine: Monthly Shōnen Jump
- Published: October 1972

I Saw It: The Atomic Bombing of Hiroshima: A Survivor's True Story, titled Ore wa Mita (おれは見た) in Japanese, is a one-shot manga by Keiji Nakazawa that first appeared in 1972 as a 48-page feature in the magazine Monthly Shōnen Jump. The story was later published in a collection of Nakazawa's short stories by Holp Shuppan. I Saw It is an autobiographical piece following the life of Nakazawa from his youngest days in post-war Hiroshima, up until his adulthood. I Saw It became the predecessor for Nakazawa's popular manga series Barefoot Gen.

The volume was released in North American in a colorized English translated volume by Educomics under the title I Saw It: The Atomic Bombing of Hiroshima: A Survivor's True Story in 1982.

== Publication history ==
I Saw It premiered as a one-shot work in a September 30, 1972 special issue of Weekly Shōnen Jump, entitled Monthly Shōnen Jump featuring manga based on various creators' biographies. Monthly Shōnen Jump later split into its own manga anthology. Nakazawa's editor later urged him to write a longer series based on I Saw It, which became the series Barefoot Gen. I Saw It was later published by Holp Shuppan as a part of a compilation of Nakazawa's short stories entitled Heiwa no Kane Series (平和の鐘シリーズ).

=== English translation ===
The company Educomics discontinued their license for Barefoot Gen in order to start their translation on the I Saw It manga. It was published in a single volume under the title I Saw It: The Atomic Bombing of Hiroshima: A Survivor's True Story. Educomics colorized the series and offered lesson plans for bulk orders to aid in using the series in classrooms to help explain the war to students. Also with bulk orders, an 11 × 17 inch free poster was added for promoting the manga in stores, with endorsements by other manga artists and peace educators.

I Saw It was later included as the first story in The Mammoth Book of Best War Comics, published in 2007 by Constable & Robinson.

== Plot ==
In 1945, elementary student Keiji Nakazawa's mother wakes him up during an air raid and they rush into a wet shelter. Hungry and with there being little food, Keiji would steal and eat raw rice from storage bins. To earn money, the family painted wooden clogs. His father also did traditional Japanese paintings and his brother Yasuto welded the hulls of ships at the Kure Shipyard. Keiji's brother, Shoji, left during a group evacuation, keeping in touch through letters. On August 6, 1945, on his way to school, Keiji saw a B-29 flying overhead. At 8:15 am, it dropped an atomic bomb, nicknamed Little Boy, on Hiroshima. Keiji was knocked unconscious. The schoolyard wall had blocked most of the flames from the blast, though his cheek was impaled by a nail in a wooden board. Keiji returned to his home to learn that his mother, who had recently given birth to a baby girl, was waiting for him by the tracks on Yamaguchi Street. The rest of his family, except Yasuto, had just died. Their house had collapsed in the blast, and the father and children were trapped under the wreckage. Meanwhile, a fire had started elsewhere, but quickly spread from house to house, so the father and children were burned alive while pinned down, and while the mother listened to their screams. Later on, Keiji and Yasuto went back to their home to dig up their family's bodies.

On August 15, 1945, World War II ended and Shoji returned. The baby girl his mother gave birth to on the day of the bombing died and was cremated on the beach. Keiji returned to school and houses being rebuilt. His family was poor, and Keiji was always hunting for food. He also began collecting trash and glass to turn into items he could sell. One day, he found a copy of the manga Shin-Takarajima (New Treasure Island) by Osamu Tezuka. Inspired, he started writing his own manga and reading manga magazines at the local bookstores. Keiji submitted one of his manga creations to the magazine Omoshiro Book which accepted and published it. Wanting to improve his drawing skills, Keiji began working as a sign painter for a former war veteran. A second manuscript sent to Omoshiro Book won him second place in a contest. Keiji used the prize money to buy a palette.

One New Year's Eve, Keiji's mother Kimiyo began hemorrhaging. He purchased all the medicine he could, wanting to give her some good memories, and she slowly regained her health. Keiji moved to Tokyo to begin his career as a manga artist. Keiji's editor got him a job working as the assistant to Daiji Kazumine. One and a half years later, his manga titles began serialization in various magazines. When he returned to Hiroshima to meet his mother, she had recovered though she was unable to walk freely. She collected every issue of the magazines his works appeared in, and Keiji told her to get well so he can show her Tokyo.

Returning to Tokyo, Keiji met a woman who he fell in love with and married. Meeting Keiji's wife, Kimiyo told him that her life was now complete. She died while Keiji and his wife were en route to Tokyo. When they cremated her body, the radiation remaining in her from the bomb caused her bones to disintegrate, leaving only white dust instead of the usual ashes. Traumatized and angered, Keiji decided he would fight the atomic bomb through his manga.

Five years after Kimiyo's death, Keiji is standing by a pond and wishing he had been born in a better time. Checking the time, he realizes it's close to the deadline for his work for Weekly Shōnen Jump. He goes back into the house to get down to work.

== Reception ==
I Saw It (in the context of the story's inclusion in The Mammoth Book of Best War Comics) was reviewed by "Brick" for ComicsVillage.com: "Nakazawa's short story is infinitely more powerful for its portrayal of the sacrifices his mother makes so that Keiji can become a cartoonist." David Kendall of The List also reviewed I Saw It: "Keiji Nakazawa sets the mood with his personal account of the bombing of Hiroshima in I Saw It, a poignant tale that spells out the human cost of the atomic bomb and the implications that resonate throughout the rest of their lives."
