= Barefoot Gen: Explosion of Tears =

Barefoot Gen
- DVD cover
- Kanji: はだしのゲン 涙の爆発
- Revised Hepburn: Hadashi no Gen; Namida no Bakuhatsu
- Directed by: Tengo Yamada
- Written by: Keiji Nakazawa
- Based on: Barefoot Gen by Keiji Nakazawa
- Produced by: Tengo Yamada; Hisako Yamada
- Starring: Hiroshi Tanaka; Mariko Miyagi; Kazuhide Haruta; Ikumi Ueno; Fumiko Abe; Shoji Ishibashi; Etsuko Ichihara; Keiko Takeshita; Keishi Takamine
- Cinematography: Setsuo Kobayashi
- Music by: Taku Izumi
- Distributed by: Tengo Yamada
- Release date: March 26, 1977
- Running time: 123 minutes
- Country: Japan
- Language: Japanese

Barefoot Gen: Explosion of Tears (はだしのゲン 涙の爆発, Hadashi no Gen: Namida no Bakuhatsu) is a 1977 Japanese war drama film, directed by Tengo Yamada and based on the Japanese manga series by Keiji Nakazawa. It is a sequel to the 1976 film Barefoot Gen and is the second live-action film based on the manga.

== Plot ==
The second film picks up where the first film left off and continues the harrowing, semi-autobiographical story of Gen Nakaoka and his family as they attempt to survive and navigate the brutal fallout, starvation, and social devastation in post-atomic Hiroshima.

== Cast ==
- Kazuhide Haruta as "Gen Nakaoka", Barefoot Gen, the protagonist of the story
- Hiroshi Tanaka as "Daikichi Nakaoka", Gen's father
- Mariko Miyagi as "Kimie Nakaoka", Gen's mother
- Chizuko Iwahara as "Eiko Nakaoka", Gen's elder sister
- Fumiko Abe as "Tomoko Nakaoka", Gen's youngest sister
- Ikumi Ueno as "Ryuta"
- Shoji Ishibashi as "Seiji Yoshida"
- Etsuko Ichihara as "Kiyo Hayashi"
- Keiko Takeshita as "Mikiko"
- Keishi Takamine as "Denjiro Samejima"

== See also ==
- Barefoot Gen (anime)
- Barefoot Gen (TV drama)
- Grave of the Fireflies
