= Harry Driggs =

American cartoonist, political activist(1935-2007)

- Born: November 3, 1935 U.S.
- Died: July 14, 2007 (aged 71)
- Area: Cartoonist
- Pseudonym: R. Diggs
- Notable works: The Life and Loves of Cleopatra; Great Diggs
- Spouse: Nancy Marmol

Harry Driggs (November 3, 1935 — July 14, 2007) was an American artist, graphic designer, political activist, and underground cartoonist. Much of his comix work was published under the name R. Diggs. Driggs was a longtime resident of San Francisco, where he worked in advertising as a graphic designer and art director.

== Career ==
In June 1967 (during the so-called Summer of Love), Driggs created and self-published the pioneering underground comic The Life and Loves of Cleopatra, an obscene 28-page narrative inspired by the Elizabeth Taylor film Cleopatra, and which featured artwork that today would be seen as child pornography. The San Francisco Diggers gave away the comic in their Free Store at the corner of Cole and Carl in Haight-Ashbury.

By this time, Driggs had left for New York City, where he joined the staff of the radical newspaper the National Guardian. When he returned to San Francisco in 1969 he authorized Don Donahue of the underground publisher Apex Novelties to release a new, smaller edition of The Life and Loves of Cleopatra under Driggs' pseudonym "R. Diggs". A third edition was self-published by Driggs in 1977, and Rip Off Press put out a censored/reformatted fourth edition with new comix by Driggs in 1991.

In the early 1970s, Driggs served as commune member and art director of the underground newspaper Good Times, where he recruited fellow underground artists Trina Robbins and Guy Colwell to draw for the paper.

Throughout the 1970s, Driggs' strips and political cartoons were distributed to underground and student publications via the Rip Off Press Syndicate. Two volumes of his political cartoons were published by Rip Off Press in 1977 and 1979, under the title Great Diggs.

In the 1970s and '80s, Driggs contributed comix stories to such anthologies as Rip Off Comix and Anarchy Comics, as well as to a number of Leonard Rifas' projects, including Itchy Planet, Corporate Crime, and Energy Comics. In 1991, Rip Off Press published Greatest Diggs of All Time, collecting material from his post-1978 work.

In the 1980s, Driggs joined the newly formed Green Party, for which he designed posters, newsletters, and other materials, and did design work for local non-profits. In the late 1980s, he designed the leafy graphic logo for the San Francisco Greens, which later became the Green Party of California.

In the latter part of his career, Driggs operated "as a fine art painter and sculptor, specializing in portraits, nudes, and figurative ceramics."

== Bibliography ==
- The Life and Loves of Cleopatra (The Communications Company, June 1967) — by Harry Driggs and Maurice Lacey
  - redrawn and published by Apex Novelties, Nov. 1969 — credited to R. Diggs
  - republished by Driggs, 1977
  - censored version with new material published by Rip Off Press, 1991
- Great Diggs of '77: a Cartoonists View of 1977 from the Pages of the Rip Off Comix Syndicate, the Berkeley Barb and the Ag-Biz Tiller (64 pp., 1977) — political cartoons
- Great Diggs II: a Cartoonist's View of World Events, Compiled from the Pages of the Rip Off Comix Syndicate (36 pp., 1979) — political cartoons
- Greatest Diggs of All Time (Rip Off Press, 1991) — collecting material from Rip Off Comix, Itchy Planet, TRA [Toward Revolutionary Art] Vol. 3 No. 1, Anarchy Comics, Corporate Crime, Energy Comics, and Strip AIDS USA.
