= Barefoot Gen Part 3: Battle of Hiroshima =

Barefoot Gen
- Kanji: はだしのゲン Part 3 ヒロシマのたたかい
- Revised Hepburn: Hadashi no Gen Part 3 Hiroshima no Tatakai
- Directed by: Tengo Yamada
- Written by: Tengo Yamada (screenplay)
- Based on: Barefoot Gen by Keiji Nakazawa
- Produced by: Tengo Yamada; Hisako Yamada; Yusaku Uchida
- Starring: Mizuho Suzuki; Satomi Oka; Jun Harada; Yasufumi Hayashi; Kenichi Sakuragi; Jun Fubuki; Daigo Kusano; Rinichi Yamamoto; Ichiro Zaitsu; Akira Nishikino; Shinya Ono; Eishin Tono
- Cinematography: Masamich Sato
- Music by: Masaaki Hirao
- Production company: Gendai Productions
- Distributed by: Tengo Yamada
- Release date: July 5, 1980
- Running time: 128 minutes
- Country: Japan
- Language: Japanese

Barefoot Gen Part 3: Battle of Hiroshima (はだしのゲン Part 3 ヒロシマのたたかい, Hadashi no Gen Part 3: Hiroshima no Tatakai) is a 1980 Japanese war drama film, directed by Tengo Yamada. It is the third installment in the Barefoot Gen live-action film series.

== Plot ==
The film follows Gen and his mother as they search for housing, work, and food, encountering other survivors, including a severely burned artist named Seiji, and dealing with the death of his sister Tomoko, ending on a note of resilience as they plant wheat and launch paper lanterns.

== Cast ==
- Jun Harada as "Gen Nakaoka", Barefoot Gen, the protagonist of the story
- Mizuho Suzuki as "Daikichi Nakaoka", Gen's father
- Satomi Oka as "Kimie Nakaoka", Gen's mother
- Kenichi Sakuragi as "Koji Nakaoka", Gen's eldest brother
- Yasufumi Hayashi as "Ryuta"
- Jun Fubuki as "Sumiko Nomura"
- Daigo Kusano as "Oba"
- Rinichi Yamamoto as "Okauchi-kumi-cho"
- Ichiro Zaitsu as "Boku-san"
- Akira Nishikino as "Nakayama-sho-sa"
- Shinya Ono as "Kimai-sho-sa"
- Eishin Tono as "Tamikichi"

== See also ==
- Barefoot Gen
- Barefoot Gen, 1976 film
- Barefoot Gen (anime)
- Barefoot Gen (TV drama)
- Grave of the Fireflies
