= Shinji Maki =

Japanese comedian

- 牧 伸二
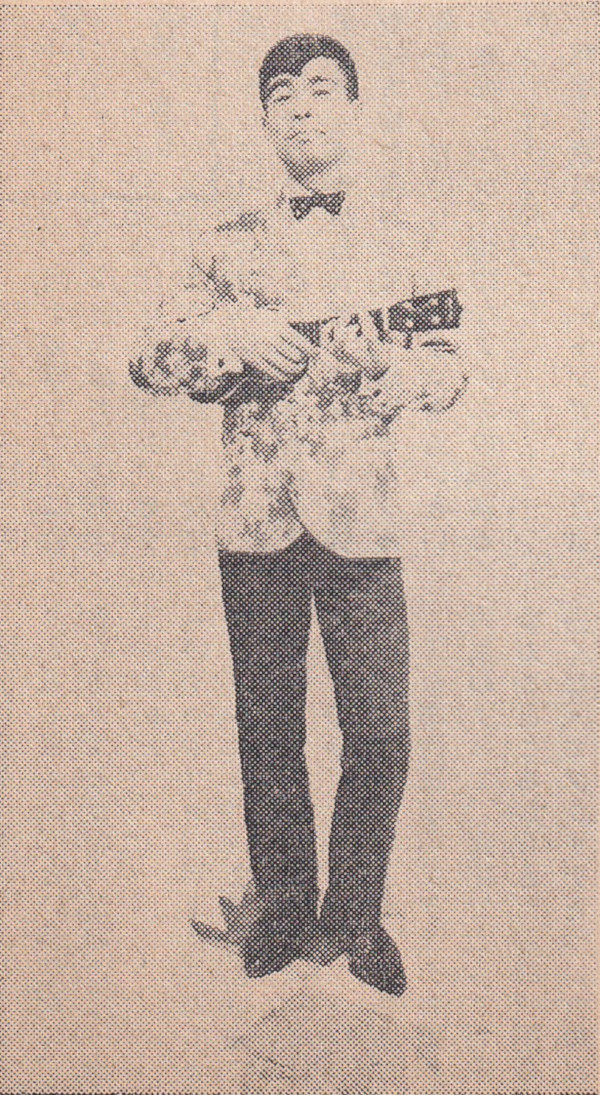
- Shinji Maki 1966
- Born: Moritsune Oi (大井 守常); 26 September 1934; Meguro, Tokyo, Japan
- Died: 29 April 2013 (aged 78); Ōta, Tokyo, Japan
- Body discovered: Tama River
- Occupation: Comedian
- Years active: 1957–2013
- Website: www.jap.co.jp/makishin/

Shinji Maki (牧 伸二, Maki Shinji; 26 September 1934 - 29 April 2013) was a Japanese mandan comedian who played the ukulele.

== Biography ==
Maki was born in Meguro, Tokyo on 26 September 1934. His real name was Moritsune Ōi (大井 守常, Ōi Moritsune). His appearance in the live vaudevillian show Shiroto Yose featuring amateur entertainers established his career as an independent comedian. Shuichi Makino coached him, and gave him his stage name.

== Career ==
In 1960, Maki became the host of the radio program Ukulele Weekly Report (ウクレレ週刊誌) on Nippon Cultural Broadcasting. In 1963, he hosted the vaudevillian TV show Taisho Terebi Yose (大正テレビ寄席) on TV Asahi.

Maki was elected the leader of the Tokyo Vaudevillian Guild in 1999.

== Death ==
Maki was found dead in the Tama River, separating Ōta, Tokyo and Kawasaki, Kanagawa, in the early hours of 29 April 2013, after apparently having jumped from the Maruko Bridge.

== See also ==
- Kinya Aikawa
- Kyosen Ōhashi
