= Kanako Fukaura =

Japanese actress (1960–2008)

- Born: Fukaura Kanako; April 4, 1960; Tokyo, Japan
- Died: August 25, 2008 (aged 48); Tokyo, Japan
- Occupation: Actress

Kanako Fukaura (深浦 加奈子, Fukaura Kanako; 4 April 1960 – 25 August 2008) was a Japanese actress. Born in Tokyo, she developed fame largely through many performances as a supporting actress.

== Selected filmography ==
| Year | Film | Role |
|---|---|---|
| 2000 | Battle Royale | Tourbus Guide |
| 2001 | Hush! | Tadokoro |
| 2002 | Border Line | |
| 2007 | Barefoot Gen (TV drama) (Hadashi no Gen) | Hanako Yoshida |
