= List of Japanese films of 2008 =

== Highest-grossing films ==
Rank	Title	Gross
1	Ponyo	¥15.5 billion
2	Boys Over Flowers: Final	¥7.75 billion
3	Suspect X	¥4.92 billion
4	Pokémon: Giratina & the Sky Warrior	¥4.80 billion
5	AIBOU: The Movie	¥4.44 billion

== List of films ==
A list of films produced in Japan in 2008 (see 2008 in film).

Title	Director	Cast	Genre	Notes
10 Promises to My Dog	Katsuhide Motoki	Rena Tanaka, Mayuko Fukuda, Etsushi Toyokawa	Drama	
20th Century Boys 1: Beginning of the End	Yukihiko Tsutsumi	Toshiaki Karasawa, Etsushi Toyokawa, Takako Tokiwa	Science fiction, Mystery	Based on a manga
Achilles and the Tortoise	Takeshi Kitano	Beat Takeshi		
Bleach: Fade to Black	Noriyuki Abe	Voices of Masakazu Morita, Fumiko Orikasa, Kentarō Itō	Supernatural/action/anime	Based on a manga/anime series created by Tite Kubo/Sequel to The DiamondDust Rebellion
Us vs the police:700 day war	Renpei Tsukamoto	Ichihara Hayato	Comedy	
Cafe Isobe	Keisuke Yoshida	Hiroyuki Miyasako, Riisa Naka, Kumiko Asō, Mari Hamada		
Cruel Restaurant	Koji Kawano	Mihiro, Sakae Yamazaki	Erotic horror	Released with unrated edition
Cyborg She	Kwak Jae Young	Keisuke Koide, Haruka Ayase	Science fiction, Time travel	
Deep Sea Monster Reigo	Shinpei Hayashiya	Taiyo Sugiura, Mai Nanami, Yukijiro Hotaru		
Departures	Yōjirō Takita	Masahiro Motoki		Won best foreign film in the 2009 Academy Awards
Detective Conan: Full Score of Fear		Minami Takayama, Wakana Yamazaki, Akira Kamiya		
Doraemon Movie: Nobita and the Green Giant Legend		Wasabi Mizuta, Megumi Ōhara, Yumi Kakazu, Subaru Kimura, Tomokazu Seki		
Engine Sentai Go-onger: Boom Boom! Bang Bang! GekijōBang!!	Noboru Takemoto	Yasuhisa Furuhara, Shinwa Kataoka, Rina Aizawa, Masahiro Usui, Kenji Ebisawa, Nao Oikawa, Hidenori Tokuyama, Yumi Sugimoto		
Flowers in the Shadows	Yuichiro Hirakawa	Junichi Okada, Aoi Miyazaki, Atsushi Itō, Aya Hirayama	Drama	Based on a novel
Hana yori Dango Final		Mao Inoue, Jun Matsumoto, Shun Oguri, Shota Matsuda	Romance	Based on a manga
Happy Flight	Shinobu Yaguchi	Seiichi Tanabe, Saburō Tokitō, Haruka Ayase	Comedy	
The Homeless Student	Tomoyuki Furumaya			
The Monster X Strikes Back	Minoru Kawasaki	Natsuki Katō, Kazuki Kato, Takeshi Kitano	Comedy	
K-20: Legend of the Mask	Shimako Sato	Takeshi Kaneshiro	Action	
Kamen Rider Den-O & Kiva: Climax Deka				
Kamen Rider Kiva: King of the Castle in the Demon World				
Kurosagi		Tomohisa Yamashita, Maki Horikita, Yui Ichikawa	Thriller	
L: Change the WorLd	Hideo Nakata	Kenichi Matsuyama		Death Note films Spin-off
Love Exposure	Shion Sono	Atsuro Watabe, Itsuji Itao, Mami Nakamura, Hikari Mitsushima, Takahiro Nishijima, Sakura Ando	romance, comedy, drama, Art House & international, action	Japanese
The Machine Girl	Noboru Iguchi	Minase Yashiro, Asami, Ryōsuke Kawamura	Horror, action comedy	
Naruto Shippūden 2: Bonds	Kamegaki Hajime			
One Piece the Movie: Episode of Chopper: Bloom in the Winter, Miracle Sakura		Mayumi Tanaka, Kazuya Nakai, Akemi Okamura, Kappei Yamaguchi, Hiroaki Hirata, Ikue Ōtani, Yuriko Yamaguchi, Kazuki Yao		Series creator Eiichirō Oda took part in screenwriting
Orochi	Norio Tsuruta	Yoshino Kimura, Noriko Nakagoshi, Mitsuki Tanimura		Based on a manga
Pokémon: Giratina and the Sky Warrior				
Ponyo on the Cliff by the Sea	Hayao Miyazaki		Fantasy anime	
Pyū to Fuku! Jaguar - The Movie	Makkoi Saitō	Jun Kaname, Hiroaki Ogi, Mai Takahashi	Comedy, Musical	Live-Action film based on a manga
Sakigake!! Otokojuku	Tak Sakaguchi	Tak Sakaguchi, Shōei, Akaji Maro, Hideo Sakaki, Tetsushi Tanaka, Hiroyuki Onoue, Shintaro Yamada, Shun Sugata		Live-Action film based on a manga
School Days with a Pig	Tetsu Maeda	Satoshi Tsumabuki, Mieko Harada, Tomoko Tabata		Based on a true event
Shaolin Girl	Katsuyuki Motohiro	Kou Shibasaki, Toru Nakamura, Kitty Zhang Yuqi, Tin Kai Man, Lam Chi Chung, Takashi Okamura, Yōsuke Eguchi	Comedy	Inspired by the 2001 Hong Kong film Shaolin Soccer
Superior Ultraman 8 Brothers	Takeshi Yagi	Hiroshi Nagano	Comedy	This Has King Gesura King Pandon Super Alien Hipporit King Goldras King Silvergon Ultraman Tiga Ultraman Dyna Ultraman Gaia Ultraman Ultraseven Ultraman Jack Ultraman Ace Ultraman Mebius and Giga Chimera
A Tale of Mari and Three Puppies	Ryuichi Inomata	Eiichiro Funakoshi, Akiko Matsumoto, Ryohei Hirota		
The Taste of Fish	Shingo Matsubara	Takao Osawa, Rena Tanaka, Tsuyoshi Ihara, Yoko Moriguchi, Shiro Ito, Akira Emoto	Drama	Based on a manga
Tokyo Gore Police	Yoshihiro Nishimura	Itsuji Itao, Camille LaBry, Shōko Nakahara	Action, Horror	
Tokyo Sonata	Kiyoshi Kurosawa	Teruyuki Kagawa, Kyōko Koizumi	Drama	
Tsuribaka Nisshi 19: Yokoso! Suzuki Kensetsu Goikko Sama	Yūzō Asahara	Toshiyuki Nishida, Miyoko Asada		
