= Melinda Gebbie =

American comics artist and writer

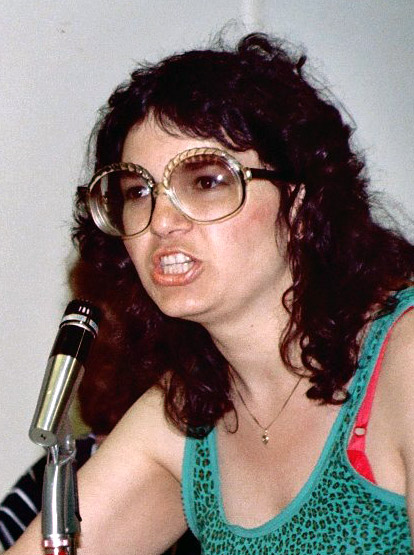
- Gebbie in 1982
- Born: San Francisco, California
- Areas: Writer, Penciller, Inker
- Notable works: Lost Girls; Cobweb
- Spouse: Alan Moore (m. 2007)

Melinda Gebbie (born 1947) is an American comics artist and writer, known for her participation in the underground comix movement. She is also known for creating the controversial work Fresca Zizis and her contributions to Wimmen's Comix, as well as her work with her husband Alan Moore on the three-volume graphic novel Lost Girls and the Tomorrow Stories anthology series.

== Personal life ==
Melinda Gebbie was born in San Francisco. She became interested in comics in 1973, when she met writer/artist Lee Marrs at a publishers' fair.

== Career ==
Melinda Gebbie contributed her first comic strip to Wimmen's Comix #3, the inceptive all-women anthology published by Last Gasp. She wrote and drew short stories for Wimmen's Comix and many other anthologies, including Tits & Clits Comix, Wet Satin, and Anarchy Comics. In 1977 she completed her own solo comic book, Fresca Zizis, which was later banned in Britain in 1985 for obscenity, and still is to this day.

In 1984, she moved to England to work on the animated film adaptation of Raymond Briggs' When the Wind Blows. Following this, she worked in a variety of illustration and office jobs and continued making short stories for anthologies such as Strip AIDS and Heartbreak Hotel. In the early 1990s, Alan Moore and Gebbie began collaborating on Lost Girls, a story in which the female protagonists of Peter and Wendy, Alice's Adventures in Wonderland, and The Wonderful Wizard of Oz meet and share sexual stories and experiences. Moore wrote the story, and Gebbie illustrated it. The story was finished in 2006. Meanwhile, she and Moore created Cobweb, a mysterious heroine who appeared in twelve issues of the Moore-written anthology Tomorrow Stories between 1999 and 2002.

=== Feminism in the Underground Comix Movement ===
Hilary Chute claims that the underground comix movement was parallel to second-wave feminism because it gave women comic artists the ability to establish work that was political and freely explore and publish their artistic expression. Autobiographical comics were popular among the underground comix industry due to groups of people being underrepresented in the mainstream comics industry. Although they were not completely autobiographical, comics like Tits & Clits, Wimmen's Comix, and Twisted Sisters contained many stores that touched on the comic artists' personal experiences. Their stories discussed topics that were not represented in the male-dominated mainstream and underground comix, because it addressed women's point of view on sex, masturbation, abuse, coming out, and menstruation. Many of the male anthologies created in the underground kept women from collaborating with them, which prompted the creation of all-girl collaborated comics like It Ain't Me Babe and Wimmen's Comix. Although the series of publication was not consistent, Wimmen's Comix published 17 issues from 1972 to 1992.

=== Fresca Zizis (Last Gasp, 1977) ===
In 1977, Melinda Gebbie produced her first solo work, Fresca Zizis. The title means "fresh cocks" in southern Italy dialect. During the 1980s, her comic book was banned in Britain for obscenity due to its pornographic illustrations. Fresca Zizis is semi-autobiographical and includes Gebbie's past experiences with childhood abuse and sex, as well as portraits and stories of fellow cartoonist friends such as Trina Robbins and Lee Marrs. Gebbie describes that it "deals with the cruelty of lovers, the excesses of youth, and the states of depression and dreams - a warning and a comfort to those who venture out too deep." When Gebbie was put on trial to defend the 'obscenity' in her work, she explained that the illustrations from the comic book come from her own experiences and argued that the people who put her through those experiences should be seen as obscene rather than her work, which is portrayed in her comic called 'Public Enemy' in Anarchy Comics issue #4.

=== Lost Girls (Top Shelf, 2006) ===
The graphic novel Lost Girls was illustrated by Gebbie and written by her husband Alan Moore. It took Gebbie 16 years to illustrate the comic due to the layering techniques used to create the shimmering, children's book-like effect, which was done by her use of water colors and 12-14 layers of colored pencils. Lost Girls follows the story of three young girls that come from popular fiction; Alice from Through the Looking Glass, Dorothy from The Wizard of Oz, and Wendy from Peter and Wendy. The three female protagonists meet at an Austrian hotel and share with each other their past sexual fantasies and experiences in flashbacks, while also meeting others who are staying at the hotel and having sex with them. The stories of each female protagonist's sexual experience is integrated within their original narratives from popular fiction. Due to the Coroners and Justice Act, many comic artists thought the book would be banned in the UK because of its depictions of child pornography, however, it is still sold in the UK.

== Bibliography ==
- Fresca Zizis (Last Gasp Publishing, 1977)
- Lost Girls (with writer Alan Moore, Top Shelf Productions, 2006, ISBN 1-891830-74-0)

=== Anthologies ===
- Cobweb (with writer Alan Moore, in Tomorrow Stories #1–8, America's Best Comics/Wildstorm, 1999–2002)
- Heartbreak Hotel
- Strip AIDS
- "The Cockpit" (in Wet Satin #1, Last Gasp Publishing)
- "My Three Swans", in Young Lust #6 (Last Gasp Publishing)
- Wimmen's Comix #4–7 (Last Gasp Publishing)
- Anarchy Comics (Last Gasp Publishing)
- 24 Panels: "If Einstein's Right..." (with writer Alan Moore, Image Comics, 2018)
