= Barefoot Gen =

Japanese manga series

- Original first volume in Japanese by Chuokoron-Shinsha

はだしのゲン (Hadashi no Gen)
- Genre: Historical
- Manga
- Written by: Keiji Nakazawa
- Published by: Shueisha; Chuokoron-Shinsha
- English publisher: NA: Educomics; New Society Publishers; Last Gasp
- Magazine: Weekly Shōnen Jump; Shimin; Bunka Hyōron; Kyōiku Hyōron
- Original run: May 22, 1973 – 1987
- Volumes: 10
- Novel

Hadashi no Gen wa Pikadon o Wasurenai; (Barefoot Gen Will Never Forget the Bomb)
- Written by: Keiji Nakazawa
- Published by: Iwanami Shoten
- Published: July 1982
- Novel

Hadashi no Gen he no Tegami; (A Letter to Barefoot Gen)
- Written by: Keiji Nakazawa
- Published by: KyouikuShiryo Publishing
- Published: July 1991
- Novel

Jiden Hadashi no Gen; (Autobiography of Barefoot Gen)
- Written by: Keiji Nakazawa
- Published by: KyouikuShiryo Publishing
- Published: July 1994
- Novel

Hadashi no Gen in Hiroshima; (Barefoot Gen in Hiroshima)
- Written by: Keiji Nakazawa; Kyo Kijima
- Published by: Kodansha
- Published: July 1999
- Novel

Hadashi no Gen ga ita Fukei; (Where Barefoot Gen Was)
- Written by: Kazuma Yoshimura; Yoshiaki Fukuma
- Published by: Azusa Syuppansya
- Published: July 2006
- Television drama

Barefoot Gen
- Directed by: Nishiura Masaki; Murakami Masanori
- Original network: Fuji TV
- Original run: August 10, 2007 – August 11, 2007
- Episodes: 2
- Novel

Hadashi no Gen wa Hiroshima o Wasurenai; (Barefoot Gen will never forget about Hiroshima)
- Written by: Keiji Nakazawa
- Published by: Iwanami Shoten
- Published: August 2008
- Live-action films
- Barefoot Gen (1976); Barefoot Gen: Explosion of Tears (1977); Barefoot Gen Part 3: Battle of Hiroshima (1980)
- Anime films
- Barefoot Gen (1983); Barefoot Gen 2 (1986)

Barefoot Gen (Japanese: はだしのゲン, Hepburn: Hadashi no Gen) is a Japanese historical manga series written and illustrated by Keiji Nakazawa, loosely based on Nakazawa's experiences as a survivor of the Hiroshima atomic bombing. The series begins in 1945 in and around Hiroshima, Japan, where six-year-old Gen Nakaoka lives with his family. After Hiroshima is destroyed by the bombing, Gen and other survivors deal with the aftermath. The series was published in several magazines, including Weekly Shōnen Jump, from 1973 to 1987. It was adapted into three live-action film versions directed by Tengo Yamada, which were released between 1976 and 1980. Madhouse released two anime films, one in 1983 and the other in 1986. In August 2007, a two-night live-action television drama series aired in Japan on Fuji TV.

Cartoonist Keiji Nakazawa created Ore wa Mita (translated into English as I Saw It), an eyewitness account of the atomic-bomb devastation in Japan, for Monthly Shōnen Jump in 1972. It was published in the United States by Educomics in 1982. Nakazawa began to serialize the longer, autobiographical Hadashi No Gen (Barefoot Gen) in the June 4, 1973, issue of Weekly Shōnen Jump. It was canceled after a year and a half and moved to three other, less widely distributed magazines: Shimin (Citizen), Bunka Hyōron (Cultural Criticism), and Kyōiku Hyōron (Educational Criticism). The series began to appear in Japanese book collections in 1975.

== Origins ==
Nakazawa was previously hesitant to publish an autobiographical account of the Hiroshima bombing. Much of his early work as an illustrator strayed far away from the topic of Hiroshima. However, his thoughts on the matter changed upon the death of his mother. After she was cremated, the bones that would usually remain were also turned to ash due to the radioactive cesium weakening her bones, which left Nakazawa distraught. This is what inspired him to finally face his past and start incorporating the bombings into his work. Nonetheless, his work still was not autobiographical for various reasons. He knew A-bomb survivors were often mistreated and looked down upon. He also worried that people would think he was trying to make a business off of his experiences. A mix of pressure from Shonen Jump editors and his increasingly pacifist views led him to finally begin to write his story in Barefoot Gen, with the first issue debuting in 1973.

== Plot ==
=== Volume 1: A Cartoon Story of Hiroshima ===
The story begins in Hiroshima in April 1945. Six-year-old Gen Nakaoka and his family live in poverty, struggling to make ends meet. His father, Daikichi, urges them to "be like wheat" (which grows strong, despite being trodden on) and is critical of the war. When he is drunk at a mandatory combat drill and talks back to his instructor, the Nakaokas are branded as traitors and become subjects to harassment and discrimination by their neighbors. To restore his family's honor, Gen's older brother Koji joins the Imperial Navy against Daikichi's wishes. He is subjected to a brutal training regimen by his commanding officer, which drives one of his friends to suicide. On August 6, 1945, an atomic bomb is dropped on Hiroshima. Daikichi and Gen's siblings are killed in the fires, but he and his mother Kimie escape thanks to a Korean neighbor Mr. Pak who was also discriminated and harassed by the neighbors like the Nakaokas only for his nationality. The shock makes her give birth prematurely to Tomoko, his sister.

=== Volume 2: The Day After ===
In the days after the attack, Gen and his mother see the horrors wrought by the bomb. Hiroshima is in ruins, full of people dead and dying from burns and radiation sickness. Gen meets Natsue, a girl who strongly resembles his dead sister. Her face is severely burned; she tries to commit suicide when she realizes it, but Gen convinces her to continue living. Gen leaves her to find rice, and his mother adopts Ryuta, an orphan who looks just like his younger brother Shinji. After Gen returns to their burnt-out home and retrieves the remains of his father and siblings, he and his family move in with Kimie's friend Kiyo. Kiyo's stingy mother-in-law conspires with her spoiled grandchildren to drive the Nakaokas out, falsely accusing the children and Kimie of stealing rice the grandchildren had actually stolen.

=== Volume 3: Life After the Bomb ===
The family looks for housing in vain, since they cannot afford a place to stay. The remorseful Kiyo invites them back, but her mother-in-law demands rent. Gen looks for work to earn money. A man hires him to look after his brother Seiji, who has been burnt severely from head to toe and lives in squalor. Although Seiji is initially reluctant, he warms up to Gen over time. Gen learns that Seiji is an artist who has lost the will to live because his burns have left him unable to hold a brush. Gen helps Seiji learn to paint with his teeth, but the artist eventually dies of his injuries. On August 14, Emperor Hirohito announces Japan's surrender over the radio. When Kimie needs a doctor, Gen cannot find anyone who will help without payment in money or food.

=== Volume 4: Out of the Ashes ===
After Japan's surrender, American occupation forces began to arrive to aid rebuilding efforts. After hearing rumors about the Americans, Gen and Ryuta arm themselves with a pistol they find in an abandoned weapons cache. Their fears ease when the Americans give them candy, but they see a group of American soldiers harvesting organs from corpses for medical research. Kiyo's mother-in-law again evicts Gen's family after Gen fights with her grandchildren, forcing the family to move into an abandoned bomb shelter. Gen, Ryuta and their family are dying of malnutrition, and they try to kill a dog for food but cannot do it. Gen and Ryuta steal cans of what they think is American food, but are condoms. They steal from the Americans again, with help from local yakuza. The yakuza betray Gen and Ryuta, forcing Ryuta to kill two gang members. Impressed with Ryuta, Masa (leader of a rival gang) takes him in. Before escaping with the yakuza, Ryuta leaves money outside Gen's door.

Gen returns to school, where he and a girl named Michiko are ridiculed for being bald. He defends Michiko, and is challenged to climb a tall tower; the first to return with a pigeon's egg wins. As Gen and the bully climb, the tower starts to crumble beneath them and Gen saves the bully from falling. Michiko tells Gen that an American soldier had raped her sister, who afterwards became a prostitute to provide for Michiko. Gen returns home to find Tomoko missing.

Suspecting that the bully knows about Tomoko's disappearance, Gen follows him and learns that he is using Tomoko to trick mothers dying of acute radiation syndrome into thinking that she is their missing children. Tomoko develops radiation sickness, and her doctor says she will die without an expensive American medicine. Gen and the kidnappers cannot raise the money, but Gen's Korean neighbor Mr. Pak does. Gen returns to his family and finds Tomoko dead, but his hair is growing back.

=== Volume 5: The Never-Ending War ===
In December 1947, Ryuta (now a juvenile delinquent working for the yakuza) visits Gen. Gen follows Ryuta and meets several orphans including Katsuko, a girl physically scarred by the bomb. As an orphaned hibakusha, she cannot attend school. Gen lends Katsuko his books, promising to teach her. Masa teaches Ryuta and the other orphans to shoot because he wants them to kill Mitey, his rival. Donguri (one of the orphans) kills Mitey; Gen encourages the others to flee, but Masa follows them. Ryuta shoots Masa and his henchman. The orphans build a makeshift house with Gen, who lives with them with an old man cast away by his relatives for being too ill from radiation to work. Rice cakes are distributed on New Year's Day to encourage cheers for Emperor Hirohito. Gen refuses to cheer because of his father's beliefs and Hirohito's decision to fight the war.

He learns that the local official who called Gen's father a traitor for supporting peace and refused to help free Gen's father, brother, and sister from their house when the bomb fell is running for office, claiming that he was always for peace. Gen enters a campaign meeting, exposes the official, and is thrown out.

Gen's mother is ill and her doctor says her only hope is the American-run Atomic Bomb Casualty Commission (ABCC), but Gen and his mother refuse to accept American help at first. His mother then reluctantly goes to the ABCC, which offers no help apart from research. When Gen rescues a girl from bullies, he learns that her father collects victim bodies to sell to the ABCC. The commission rewards corrupt doctors with medicine in exchange for referrals, and Gen sees boys fishing skulls from the river to sell to the ABCC. He decides that surviving at American expense is justified, but teaches the other children to catch shrimp instead of skulls.

=== Volume 6: Writing the Truth ===
The Hiroshima orphans demonstrate their misery to American soldiers to sell the skulls of victims. They hope to buy lots of food, but a pickpocket robs them on the train. Huge bags of black-market food is thrown off the train they had just left. The orphans try to hide it, are caught, and escape the police.

Koji, working in the mines, is drinking and gambling. Gen returns home with the rice to find his mother very ill, but they cannot afford a doctor. Ryuta robs a casino to pay for Kimie's treatment; the mob is after him, and he unsuccessfully tries to flee Hiroshima. He surrenders to the police.

In July 1948, Gen is tearing down a wall to collect bricks to sell. A girl has hanged herself because of radiation scars that made everyone treat her like a monster. Gen writes to Koji, asking for money for their mother's hospital bills. He saves Natsue from suicide and brings her back to the orphans, asking Katsuko to watch her. Gen is falsely accused of theft. Natsue attempts suicide again, and Gen brings her and Katsuko to see someone sewing with her feet and mouth. They decide to learn to sew and open a clothing store.

Gen sees other orphans paid well for copper stolen from a shipyard. Gen and Musubi (another orphan) are caught by the shipyard owners, who want to kill them. They escape, fill their boat with too much copper, and it sinks. Gen and Musubi buy a sewing machine for Katsuko and Natsue. Four years after the bombing, people are still dying from radiation sickness.

=== Volume 7: Bones into Dust ===
Four years after the bombing, Gen is determined to get his novel published. No Japanese publisher will print it, and Ryuta suggests a prison. Gen asks from Mr. Pak for help, who is delighted to reveal the truth about what happened. Koreans suffered twice: from Japanese enslavement, and the bomb. He does not want money for his help. Since Ryuta cannot read, Gen reads the book to him. The descriptions of the effects of the bomb and the plea to ensure that nothing like it could happen again is too much for Ryuta, who begs him to stop.

A few days later, they are brought by American soldiers to an occupation base in Kure. A Japanese-American officer interrogates them about the book, since writing about the bomb in occupied Japan is illegal. A fellow prisoner explains that a special operations team will try to turn them into spies.

Gen, Ryuta, and Noro cannot escape. Gen wounds himself with a loose nail, smears the blood, and tells the others to act ill; they are released. A taxi driver is angry because someone has put sugar in his tank, ruining his livelihood. Gen asks Mr. Pak for sugar cubes to put American jeeps and trucks out of commission, creating work for Japanese mechanics.

He finds his mother home from the hospital, seemingly cured; however, Akira says that she has four months to live and does not know it. It is hard for Gen and Akira to pretend all is well. As she talks about her arranged marriage to their father, whom she grew to love, and how people who were against the war were tortured and killed even before it had started, Gen determines to earn money to send his mother to visit Kyoto one last time. He learns that collecting excrement for fertilizer is lucrative.

Koji arrives after hearing about their mother, ashamed of wasting the money he should have sent home, and Gen gives him the money he has earned so he can say he is taking them all to Kyoto. When they arrive, she says that she can now die happy and rejoin their father; she knew that she was not cured, since her stomach pain continued. When she dies, Gen refuses to have her cremated. He is determined to bring her body to Tokyo so that General MacArthur can see it, apologize for using the bomb, and promise to never do so again. He wants the Emperor – who declared war as a god, then admitted he was mortal when he lost – to apologize to her and take responsibility for the war. Koji has to knock him out to have their mother cremated, believing that one person cannot do this and all Japan must raise their voices together. Gen is desolate until he dreams of his parents, encouraging him to be like the wheat.

=== Volume 8: Merchants of Death ===
By June 25, 1950, Japan was threatened with involvement in the Korean War. Gen and his teacher, Mr. Ohta, want everyone to do all they can to prevent war; class president Aihara believes war is inevitable and necessary, and challenges Gen to a fight after school. He gives Gen a knife before Gen wins.

The Americans outlaw antiwar protests, but Aihara's skull is fractured. They learn that Aihara was also orphaned and was adopted by a woman he followed around because she resembled his mother. Dying of leukemia, he keeps trying to commit suicide because he cannot face death. Ryuta and Gen reinterest him in life by pitching a baseball outside his home, and Aihara pitches well.

They find Mr. Ohta drunk, and he buys them sake. He hates General MacArthur's National Police Reserve, ostensibly to train police but actually to create an army to use in Korea. The Hiroshima police have announced that they will arrest anyone protesting the war. Gen gets drunk and plans for the anniversary of the bombing the following day; they all ring bells and pray for peace. Mr. Ohta supposedly resigns, and Gen sees someone injecting methamphetamine. During the war, soldiers received Philopon (the original brand name for methamphetamine). It is legal in Japan, and many people are addicted. Gen is drinking whiskey when Natsue develops appendicitis and needs to be hospitalized for two weeks. He finds Mr. Ohta shooting up, and learns that he did not resign – he was fired by MacArthur in the Red Purge. People are told that union activists are committing sabotage. Gen pleads with Mr. Ohta not to give up. The orphans chip in to pay Mr. Ohta to teach them at his home – even Ryuta, who has not been in school since the bombing. He promises to start a new school. Gen, sympathetic to the Koreans, fears that Japan will be attacked for housing American planes.

Natsue's scar has reopened, and she needs more surgery. She does not heal because of the radiation, and goes to Itsukaichi to make a pot; Ryuta suggests that they look for her. The city plans to tear down Gen's home to build a road, and the brothers have 30 days to move. Gen helps a woman in Itsukaichi, and finds Natsue in her home. Natsue says that the pot is for her ashes, but Gen wants her to live. He and Koji get drunk. Gen overhears Koji's conversation with his girlfriend Hiroko, who is unwilling to wait two years to get married and have Akira and Gen live with them. Akira decides to go to Osaka and become a businessman for peace, and Gen is determined to be self-reliant and fight to preserve their home. In October 1950, the threat of war is increasing.

=== Volume 9: Breaking Down Borders ===
Gen and Ryuta vainly throw rocks from the roof to resist the demolition of Gen's home. Natsue finishes her pot and returns home to the orphans, who are celebrating Gen's joining them. He sees a crack in the pot, which falls and breaks; Natsue is too ill to make another. Gen runs off after breaking the pot on purpose to give her a reason to live and make another. Natsue dies of colorectal cancer on December 30, 1950, the day MacArthur convinces President Truman to plan to use nuclear weapons in Korea. Representatives of the Atomic Bomb Casualty Commission (ABCC) offers to pay ¥30,000 and arrange for Natsue's cremation so the commission can look for a cure for radiation sickness, but Gen angrily sends them away.

Natsue's ashes are buried in January, in an urn Gen made. They want to bury her on Mount Hiji, but discover that the ABCC has buildings there for Hiroshima corpses. Gen decides to bury Natsue with his family, but a boy snatches the box with the urn and runs away. His grandfather is ashamed that his grandson is a thief, but the boy is desperate to get his grandfather's oil paints to finish his painting.

Gen received Seiji's painting tools at his death to finish his painting, which he never did. He is willing to give them to the grandfather, who destroys all his paintings in despair. When Gen brings the paints to him anyway, the old man tells him: "Art has no borders". Gen decides to combine art with earning a living by training as a sign painter. He accidentally ruins a rush-job sign and promises to fix it for free, but the grandfather offers to take over and begins teaching Gen about perspective.

Kurosaki, another employee, is jealous. After losing his whole family, he was taken in by a Buddhist monk who brought him to an island with 15 other orphans as slave labor. When a girl became ill, the monk did not take her to the hospital and she died. Kurosaki barely escaped the island, and was comforted by a beautiful rainbow on a painted sign. Gen and the orphans see a sign advertising a lecture by the neighborhood chairman who had called Gen's father a traitor, but a rainbow soothes them. Gen wants to build rainbow bridges from country to country in a world without borders, free of war.

=== Volume 10: Never Give Up ===
In March 1953, Gen is graduating from middle school, learning to paint and working at the sign shop. Mr. Ohta has begun his 10-student school. On April 28, 1953, a treaty with the U.S. launched Japanese independence. On Bloody May Day that year, unauthorized demonstrators clashed with police outside the Imperial Palace; a special August 6 magazine issue shocked Japan with never-before-seen photos of the bombing devastation. The prime minister dissolved the lower house after calling a questioner a derogatory name.

At his graduation ceremony, Gen protests the singing of the national anthem and details the emperor's war crimes. A beautiful girl accidentally runs into him while trying to catch a streetcar, and he is infatuated. Mr. Amano and Gen are "fired" from the sign-painting shop (where they were unpaid) for objecting to militaristic talk by owner Mr. Nakao. Gen sees the girl again, and follows her home. Mr. Nakao, her father, forbids her from having anything to do with him. Musubi stays out late after a bar owner gives him an energy shot. Ryuta asks Mitsuko (the girl) for a date, and shows her Gen's sketchbook with pictures of her and declarations of love. She explains that her father has forbidden it, but the sketchbook impresses her. Her father tells her that she is the one important thing in his life; he dreams of seeing her married to the perfect husband and giving him grandchildren. Musubi returns to the bar for another energy shot, which he is told is full of vitamins. Mitsuko gets Gen's address from the store to thank him for the sketchbook, and agrees to model for more sketches.

On July 27, 1953, the Korean armistice is signed. The dresses are selling well, but Ryuta and Katsuko wonder where Musubi is. Gen and Mitsuko go to the Itsukushima Shrine and lament that nearly all of its deer were killed for food at the end of the war. Mitsuko says that she considers herself a murderer because when the bomb was dropped, she (a small child) could not carry her injured mother and ran for her own life; Gen also left his father, sister, and brother. On his way home, Gen runs into an ill-looking Musubi on a streetcar. He shoves Gen and runs to the bar for a shot for which he cannot pay. He is told that he will be in agony for days, since he is addicted; the "vitamins" are illegal drugs. He steals money from the orphans' savings for a dress shop to pay for more shots. He returns home, claiming to be well and sorry for his absence, but Gen catches him preparing to shoot up and smashes the needle. Musubi runs away rather than face withdrawal.

The Hiroshima ABCC announces a steep rise in leukemia in atomic-bomb survivors; Mitsuko wants to become a doctor, talking about how the yakuza used Hiroshima orphans to kill other gangsters. She develops leukemia, and dies. Her father blames Gen, who blames Mr. Nakao's militarism. Musubi has gone through the savings and tries to break into the bar to get drugs, but is beaten up and left for dead; he makes it back to the orphans before he dies. Gen vows revenge, but Ryuta (who has already killed two gangsters) says that he will take care of it. Ryuta, about to turn himself in, is talked into escaping to Tokyo with Katsuko. As Gen places Musubi's ashes with Gen's family, Mr. Amano encourages him to go to Tokyo and become an artist.

== Themes ==
The themes of Barefoot Gen cover grief, discrimination, criticism of nationalism, the dangers of nuclear warfare, and the abuse of refugees. The later chapters turn their focus to how survivors struggled to live after the bombing of Hiroshima, including the discrimination that drove characters into crime. Those not affected by the bombing feared survivors would get them sick from radiation, while those who turned to crime became thieves for the Yakuzas. Grief and loss are constant in the narratives along with observations of anti-Korean racism in Japan.

Takayuki Kawaguchi (川口 隆行, Kawaguchi Takayuki), author of "Barefoot Gen and 'A-Bomb Literature': Remembering the Nuclear Experience" (「はだしのゲン」と「原爆文学」 ――原爆体験の再記憶化をめぐって, "Hadashi no Gen" to "Genbaku Bungaku"—Genbaku Taiken no Saikiokuka o Megutte), believes that the characters of Katsuko and Natsue modify the Hiroshima Maiden narrative of Black Rain; although they are courageous, they are severely scarred physically and mentally.

== Translations ==
A volunteer pacifist organization, Project Gen, was formed in Tokyo in 1976 to produce English translations of the series. Translations began to be printed in 1978, made available in the US through James Peck of the War Resisters League in New York City; the translations ended with the fourth volume. Leonard Rifas' EduComics began publishing it in 1980 as Gen of Hiroshima, the "first full-length translation of a manga from Japanese into English to be published in the West." It was unpopular, however, and the series was canceled after two volumes.

The Rondo Gen group published an Esperanto translation as Nudpieda Gen (Barefoot Gen) in 1982. Its chief translator was Izumi Yukio. The German Rowohlt Verlag published the first volume in 1982 as a mass market paperback. Carlsen Comics began to publish the series in 2004, but canceled publication after four volumes. Both publishers used the title Barfuß durch Hiroshima (Barefoot through Hiroshima).

Its first volume was published in Norwegian in 1986 by GEVION norsk forlag A/S as Gen, Gutten fra Hiroshima (Gen, the Boy from Hiroshima). A Swedish edition (Gen – Pojken från Hiroshima) was published in 1985 by Alvglans förlag as, possibly, the earliest published manga in that language.

The first volume was published in Finnish in 1985 by Jalava, and was the first Japanese comic published in Finland. Its Finnish title is Hiroshiman poika (Son of Hiroshima), translated by Kaija-Leena Ogihara. In 2006, Jalava republished the first volume (with its original translation) and published the second volume. All 10 volumes were published in Poland by Waneko from 2004 to 2011 as Hiroszima 1945: Bosonogi Gen.

An Arabic translation was published in Egypt by Maher El-Sherbini, a professor in Cairo University's department of Japanese language and literature. He began the project in 1992 as an exchange student at the Hiroshima University Graduate School of Letters, where he completed his master's and doctorate degrees. The first volume was published in January 2015, and all 10 volumes have been translated. New Society Publishers began to release a second English-language version of the series in graphic novel format (as Barefoot Gen: The Cartoon Story of Hiroshima) in 1988.

=== New English edition ===
A new English translation began to be published by Last Gasp in 2004 with an introduction by Art Spiegelman, who has compared the work to his Maus (about the experiences of Spiegelman's father during the Holocaust in Europe).

- Barefoot Gen Vol. 1: A Cartoon Story of Hiroshima (paperback ed.). Last Gasp. 2004 [1972–1973]. ISBN 0-86719-602-5.
- Barefoot Gen Vol. 2: The Day After (paperback ed.). Last Gasp. 2004 [1972–1973]. ISBN 0-86719-619-X.
- Barefoot Gen Vol. 3: Life After The Bomb (paperback ed.). Last Gasp. 2005 [1972–1973]. ISBN 978-0-86719-594-1. OL 8330688M.
- Barefoot Gen Vol. 4: Out Of The Ashes (paperback ed.). Last Gasp. 2005 [1972–1973]. ISBN 0-86719-595-9. OL 20389870M.
- Barefoot Gen Vol. 5: The Never-Ending War (paperback ed.). Last Gasp. 2007 [1972–1973]. ISBN 978-0-86719-596-5. OL 23085379M.
- Barefoot Gen Vol. 6: Writing the Truth (paperback ed.). Last Gasp. 2008 [1972–1973]. ISBN 978-0-86719-597-2.
- Barefoot Gen Vol. 7: Bones Into Dust (paperback ed.). Last Gasp. 2008 [1972–1973]. ISBN 978-0-86719-598-9.
- Barefoot Gen Vol. 8: Merchants of Death (paperback ed.). Last Gasp. 2009 [1972–1973]. ISBN 978-0-86719-599-6.
- Barefoot Gen Vol. 9: Breaking Down Borders (paperback ed.). Last Gasp. 2010 [1972–1973]. ISBN 978-0-86719-600-9.
- Barefoot Gen Vol. 10: Never Give Up (paperback ed.). Last Gasp. 2010 [1972–1973]. ISBN 978-0-86719-601-6.

Nakazawa planned to present a set of the series to U.S. President Barack Obama as a caution against nuclear proliferation.

== Other media ==
=== Films ===
==== Live-action ====
In 1976, 1977, and 1980, Tengo Yamada directed three live-action film adaptations. In 2009, a Hollywood producer expressed interest in a studio version of the manga.

- Barefoot Gen (1976)
- Barefoot Gen: Explosion of Tears (1977)
- Barefoot Gen Part 3: Battle of Hiroshima (1980)

==== Animation ====
Two animated films were based on the manga, in 1983 and 1986, both directed by Mori Masaki for a production company founded by Nakazawa:

- Barefoot Gen (1983)
- Barefoot Gen 2 (1986)

Barefoot Gen 2, set three years after the bombing, focuses on the survival of Gen and the orphans in Hiroshima.

Initially released individually on dub-only VHS tape by Streamline Pictures and on dub-only DVD by Image Entertainment, Geneon offered bilingual versions of the film on DVD as a set. On December 26, 2017, Discotek Media released both movies on a single Blu-ray disc. This release once again presents the first movie in a bilingual format. The second movie is only presented in Japanese language with English subtitles, as is with the Geneon release.

=== Television ===
A two-episode TV drama was produced by Fuji Television in 2007.

=== Theatre ===
Several theatrical adaptations of Barefoot Gen have been produced in Japan. In July 1996, the first stage adaptation in English premiered at the Crucible Theatre in Sheffield; the production was a collaboration between the Crucible and Tokyo's Theatre Zenshinza. British theatre director Bryn Jones traveled to Japan in 1994 for Nakazawa's permission to adapt the series' first volume for the stage. Jones returned to Sheffield to prepare the production's research, design, and dramatization with the Crucible company, Tatsuo Suzuki, and Fusako Kurahara. Nakazawa traveled to the UK to attend final rehearsals, and gave post-show talks after the opening performances. The final manuscript was adapted and dramatized by Suzuki and Jones, and was translated by Kurahara. The production received a Japan Festival Award in 1997 for outstanding achievement in furthering the understanding of Japanese culture in the United Kingdom.

== Reception ==
Barefoot Gen was well received by the activist community of the time. The activist community used it as "an instrument in the struggle against nuclear weapons" as well as the "politically charged atmosphere of a country coming to terms with defeat in Vietnam". The stark picture provided by the comic of being a survivor of Hiroshima lends credibility and usefulness to the activists movements. While affirming an anti nuclear bomb sentiment, it also promoted anti war ideals. It is used in activism at the end of the Vietnam war loss and in the midst of the cold war.

The manga has sold more than 10 million copies worldwide. There was renewed interest in Barefoot Gen in 2023 after the release of Oppenheimer, a film about J. Robert Oppenheimer (the theoretical physicist known as the "father of the atomic bomb").

== Controversy ==
In December 2012, access to Barefoot Gen became restricted in elementary and junior high schools in Matsue on the grounds that its depictions were too graphic for school children. Not only does the controversy address the manga itself, but it also brings into question Nazakawa's feelings towards the Japanese's actions, as well as who should be held accountable, providing even further points of controversy regarding the display of his stories to a younger audience. Other reasons on top of the display of graphic scenes, included a secondary group called the Citizens Against the Privileges of Korean Residents who argued against the display of this manga as they feared children would encounter and absorb ideas and understanding about history that this group would have deemed as misinformation. That being said, in terms of support, newspapers, including the Ryukyu Shinpo argued that the manga had deeper implications, comparing the banning of this book to previous historical events like Nazi book burnings. Controversy follows both the actual banning of the book as well as the aftermath and implications of the ban. The restriction was reviewed after 44 of the city's 49 school principals requested its removal, and it was lifted in August 2013. Nakazawa's widow, Misayo, expressed shock that children's access to the work had been restricted, saying: "War is brutal. It expresses that in pictures, and I want people to keep reading it."

== See also ==
- Honkawa Elementary School Peace Museum
- White Light/Black Rain: The Destruction of Hiroshima and Nagasaki (2007)
- Grave of the Fireflies
