= Ruby Ray (photographer) =

American photographer (born 1952)

- Born: 1952 (age 73–74)
- Known for: Photography

Ruby Ray (born 1952) is a photographer, particularly known for her photography of the early punk movement. She is known for her photography of marginalized and fringe musical artists, with her photographs featured in Dead Kennedys: Fresh Fruit for Rotting Vegetables, The Early Years.

== Career ==
Ruby Ray grew up in upstate New York before moving to San Francisco. She began her photography career in 1977 with Search and Destroy, a local San Francisco zine. Her first photo session was with The Dils. By 1979, Search and Destroy has ceased publishing, but Ruby Ray continued photographing local punk bands and eventually began her own publication, RE/Search.

As the punk scene dwindled, Ruby Ray moved to New York City in the 1980s.

== Exhibits ==
- Punk Passage San Francisco First Wave Punk 1977–1981. San Francisco Public Library. 12 September – 6 December 2009.

== Publications ==
Ray, Ruby and Savage, Jon. From the Edge of the World: California Punk, 1977–1981. San Francisco, Calif. : Superior Viaduct, 2013.

Ruby Ray: Kalifornia Kool Photographs 1976–1982 https://www.artbook.com/9789198451238.html
