= Barefoot Gen (1976 film) =

- DVD cover
- Kana: はだしのゲン
- Revised Hepburn: Hadashi no Gen
- Directed by: Tengo Yamada
- Written by: Keiji Nakazawa
- Based on: Barefoot Gen by Keiji Nakazawa
- Produced by: Tengo Yamada
- Starring: Rentarō Mikuni; Sachiko Hodari; Kenta Sato; Hirokazu Ishimatsu; Chizuko Iwahara; Yotaro Komatsu; Yukiya Minoshima; Fumi Soganoya; Jun Shimada; Shinhei Sakamoto; Yuko Oseki; Sakae Umezu; Akira Oizumi; Shinji Maki
- Cinematography: Sun Min An
- Music by: Takeshi Shibuya
- Distributed by: Tengo Yamada
- Release date: January 24, 1976
- Running time: 107 minutes
- Country: Japan
- Language: Japanese

Barefoot Gen (はだしのゲン, Hadashi no Gen) is a 1976 Japanese war drama film, directed by Tengo Yamada and based on the Japanese manga series of the same name. The film is set in 1945 and tells the story of the six-year-old boy Gen Nakaoka, living in Hiroshima around the time of the US atomic bombing of the city.

== Cast ==
- Kenta Sato as "Gen Nakaoka", Barefoot Gen, the protagonist of the story
- Rentarō Mikuni as "Daikichi Nakaoka", Gen's father
- Sachiko Hodari as "Kimie Nakaoka", Gen's mother
- Yotaro Komatsu as "Koji Nakaoka", Gen's eldest brother
- Chizuko Iwahara as "Eiko Nakaoka", Gen's elder sister
- Yukiya Minoshima as "Akira Nakaoka", Gen's elder brother
- Hirokazu Ishimatsu as "Shinji Nakaoka", Gen's younger brother
- Fumi Soganoya as "Denjiro Samejima"
- Jun Shimada as "Boku-san"
- Shinhei Sakamoto as teacher "Kishi"
- Yuko Oseki as teacher "Osato"
- Sakae Umezu as teacher "Hirose"
- Akira Oizumi as teacher "Numata"
- Shinji Maki as "Horikawa"

== Awards ==
- Best Director, 1976 Karlovy Vary International Film Festival
