= Keiji Nakazawa =

Japanese manga artist and writer

- Born: March 14, 1939; Hiroshima, Japan
- Died: December 19, 2012 (aged 73); Hiroshima, Japan
- Occupation: Manga artist
- Known for: Barefoot Gen

Keiji Nakazawa (中沢 啓治, Nakazawa Keiji; March 14, 1939 – December 19, 2012) was a Japanese manga artist and writer. He is best known for his semi-autobiographical series Barefoot Gen, a landmark work depicting the atomic bombing of Hiroshima and its aftermath. A hibakusha (atomic bomb survivor) himself, Nakazawa was in Hiroshima during the bombing in August 1945 and lost most of his family. His experiences shaped his artistic and political vision, leading to pioneering manga that confronted war trauma, nuclear devastation, and postwar Japanese society with stark realism and deep humanism. Barefoot Gen, serialized from 1973, became one of the first Japanese comics to gain international recognition and remains a foundational work in the genre of A-bomb manga. Through his work, Nakazawa combined personal testimony with bold criticism of militarism and nationalism, establishing manga as a medium for historical and political reflection.

== Biography ==
Nakazawa was born March 14, 1939, in Naka-ku, Hiroshima, Japan and was in the city when it was destroyed by an atomic bomb in August 1945. Most of his family members who had not evacuated died as a result of the explosion after they became trapped under the debris of their house, except for his mother and an infant sister (who died several weeks later either from malnutrition or radiation from her mother afterward).

Nakazawa graduated from middle school in 1954, and in 1961, he moved to Tokyo to become a full-time cartoonist and produced short pieces for manga anthologies such as Shōnen Gaho, Shōnen King, and Bokura.

Despite being a survivor of the atomic bomb, he never used the atomic bomb as a topic in his manga even after he debuted as a commercial manga artist in 1962. This was due to the discriminatory attitudes he had seen towards atomic bomb survivors in Tokyo. However, after his mother died in 1966, he was shocked to learn that only ashes remained after her cremation and that the American Atomic Bomb Casualty Commission had requested an autopsy on her body before cremation. This prompted him to write Kuroi Ame ni Utarete (Struck by Black Rain). He took the completed manuscript to various publishers, but for about a year, no publisher would accept it. In 1968, it was published as a "special feature length" in the May 29 issue of Houbunsha's Manga Punch. At the time, the editor-in-chief told him that they might be caught by the CIA, but Nakazawa responded, "I'd be happy to be caught." Kuroi Ame ni Utarete (Struck by Black Rain), the first of a series of five books, was a fictional story of Hiroshima survivors involved in the postwar black market.

Nakazawa chose to portray his own experience in the 1972 story Ore wa Mita (おれは見た, I saw), published in Monthly Shōnen Jump. The story was translated into English and published as a one-shot comic book by Educomics as I Saw It.

Immediately after completing I Saw It, Nakazawa began his major work, Hadashi no Gen (Barefoot Gen). This series, which eventually filled ten volumes, was based on the same events as I Saw It but expanded and fictionalized, with the young Gen Nakaoka as a stand-in for the author. Barefoot Gen depicted the bombing and its aftermath in extremely graphic detail, with Gen's experiences being even more harrowing than Nakazawa's own. It also turned a critical eye on the militarization of Japanese society during World War II and on the sometimes abusive dynamics of the traditional family. Barefoot Gen was adapted into a trilogy of live-action movies, two animated films, and a live-action TV drama.

Nakazawa announced his retirement in September 2009, citing deteriorating diabetes and cataract conditions. He canceled plans for a Barefoot Gen sequel. In September 2010, Nakazawa was diagnosed with lung cancer; in July 2011, metastasis from lung cancer was found. He died on December 19, 2012.

== Style and themes ==
=== Hiroshima atomic bomb ===
Several of his works tackle the Hiroshima atomic bombing and its aftermath. In Barefoot Gen, Keiji Nakazawa confronts the trauma of the Hiroshima atomic bombing through a deeply personal and pacifist lens. Scholar Sheng-mei Ma situates Nakazawa's work within a broader postwar trend in Japanese manga that reckons obliquely with the memory of World War II, comparing it to the work of Osamu Tezuka and Yoshinori Kobayashi. Unlike others, Nakazawa presents the A-bomb's aftermath from the perspective of a victimized antiwar family, focusing on the physical and psychological toll rather than on Japan's wartime aggression. His narrative, marked by blunt and emotionally charged illustrations, oscillates between horror and resilience. The recurring motif of wheat, symbolizing regrowth and resistance, embodies the family's struggle to survive amid devastation. Despite graphic depictions of suffering, moments of humor and endurance, especially through the protagonist Gen, offer emotional relief and underscore the human capacity for regeneration. Nakazawa's testimonial style bridges personal memory with collective trauma, appealing to global audiences through its raw sincerity and antinuclear message.

According to Yuka Hasegawa, Nakazawa's style in Barefoot Gen emphasizes the vita activa, a concept from Hannah Arendt that highlights action, labor, and work as a means of articulating the inner world (kokoro) of his characters. Through Gen's efforts to help his family survive and through the artist Seiji's trauma-driven compulsion to depict the horrors around him, Nakazawa visualizes a hibakusha subjectivity shaped by bodily pain, social exclusion, and political awakening. Unlike the introspective focus seen in other anti-war manga such as Shigeru Mizuki's work or Osamu Tezuka's exploration of moral paradoxes, Nakazawa portrays kokoro as action-oriented, grounded in the physical and political realities of post-bomb Hiroshima. Nakazawa critiques postwar nationalism and envisions a society built on active civic engagement and remembrance rather than state-driven narratives.

International critics, including Art Spiegelman and Christine Hong, have interpreted Barefoot Gen within a geopolitical framework, sometimes privileging its testimonial function over manga-specific conventions. However, manga scholars argue that such interpretations often overlook the medium's cultural contexts—such as serial publication, audience familiarity with genre norms, and the performative nature of its imagery. While Barefoot Gen has been read as an anti-war narrative, studies show that young readers often connect more with the protagonist's emotional resilience and agency than with its historical messaging. These dynamics complicate the assumption that Barefoot Gen's impact lies primarily in its ideological content rather than its form and narrative structure. Critics such as Thomas LaMarre have challenged the simplistic binary of "serious message" versus "light entertainment", arguing that Barefoot Gen operates on a biopolitical level, emphasizing survival and bodily vitality over straightforward geopolitical critique.

=== Visual style ===
In contemporary Japanese manga studies, Barefoot Gen is often analyzed not solely for its ideological content but in relation to its manga-specific form and genre context. Scholars highlight how the series combines graphic violence with stereotypical manga aesthetics, oscillating between realistic representation and stylized "mangaesque" elements.

His use of manga's multi-angled layout allows for complex, empathetic representations of trauma, testimony, and self-knowledge.

== Legacy ==
Keiji Nakazawa played a foundational role in shaping the genre of A-bomb manga, transforming the atomic bombing of Hiroshima from a peripheral theme into a central, politically conscious narrative in graphic storytelling. While earlier efforts such as Brother Pikadon (1951) and Looking at the Stars (1957) existed, Nakazawa's work marked a decisive shift in tone and cultural impact. His 1972 autobiographical manga I Saw It and the internationally renowned Barefoot Gen (1973) broke taboos by confronting the horrors of Hiroshima with unflinching realism and anti-establishment critique. These works not only personalized the trauma of the hibakusha (A-bomb survivors) but also established manga as a legitimate medium for serious historical and political reflection. The manga's initial serialization in Shōnen Jump, a boys' magazine, influenced its enduring stylistic traits and reception among youth. Despite addressing themes like war trauma and hibakusha, Barefoot Gen was seldom directly associated with anti-nuclear power discourse or broader ideological debates. In Japan, Barefoot Gen entered school libraries and was embraced as a "national manga" despite lingering biases against comics.

After Barefoot Gen, depictions of nuclear trauma briefly waned amid Japan's push toward post-war reconciliation and A-bomb fatigue. However, Nakazawa's pioneering work laid the groundwork for later revivals of the genre, particularly in the 2000s. Artists like Fumiyo Kōno, with her Town of Evening Calm, Country of Cherry Blossoms (2003), re-engaged with Hiroshima through nuanced, intergenerational stories. Kōno's work, influenced by the silence surrounding Hiroshima in popular culture, reframed the bomb's legacy from the perspective of those born after the war, focusing on everyday lives marked by inherited trauma. She, and others such as Yuki Ozawa and Shiori Matsuo, expanded the genre Nakazawa helped establish.

Barefoot Gen was the first Japanese comic to achieve wide translation, particularly through peace activism. In the early 1980s, Keiji Nakazawa's Barefoot Gen and I Saw It were among the first manga translated into English. While these translations failed commercially, they helped pave the way for the later global popularity of manga.

Nakazawa was the subject of the Japanese documentary, Barefoot Gen's Hiroshima (2011), directed by Yuko Ishida. He was nominated for the Will Eisner Comic Awards Hall of Fame at the Eisner Awards in 2020 and 2023.

== Works ==
- Ano Machi Kono Machi (あの街この街)
- Kuroi Chinmoku no hate ni (黒い沈黙の果てに)
- One Day, I Saw A Blue Sky (いつか見た青い空, Itsuka Mita Aoi Sora)
- Okinawa (オキナワ)
- Struck by Black Rain (黒い雨にうたれて, Kuroi ame ni Utarete; 1968, published in Manga Punch)
- Geki's River (ゲキの河, Geki no Kawa)
- Chinchin Densha no Shi (チンチン電車の詩)
- Maboroshi no 36 Go (幻の36号)
- Under the Eucalyptus Trees (ユーカリの木の下で, Yūkari no Kinoshita de)
- I Saw It (おれは見た, Ore wa Mita; 1982)
- The flow of the Black River (黒い河の流れに, Kuroi Kawa no Nagare ni)
- A Flock of Black Doves (黒い鳩の群れに, Kuroi Hato no Mure ni)
- Ītama Ippon (いいタマ一本)
- Suddenly, One Day (ある日突然に, Aru Nichi Totsuzen ni)
- Knowledge and Broadsword (チエと段平, Chie to Danbira)
- There is a Story of Love (ある恋の物語, Aru Koi no Monogatari)
- Good Morning (おはよう, Ohayō)
- Stupid Baseball (野球バカ, Yakyū Baka)
- Ano Machi Kono Machi (あの街この街)
- Guzu Roku Kōshinkyoku (グズ六行進曲)
- Genkotsu Iwata (げんこつ岩太; 1977, serialized in Weekly Shōnen Champion)
- Hiroshima Carp Birth Story (広島カープ誕生物語, Hiroshima Kāpu Tanjō Monogatari)
- Madcap (悪太郎, Aku Tarō)
- O Konomi Hachi-chan (お好み八ちゃん)
- Itsuka Mita Aoi Sora (いつか見た青い空)
- Otoko Nara Shōri no Utawo (男なら勝利の歌を)
- Stupid Curry (カレーバカ, Karē Baka)
- Us Forever (われら永遠に, Warera Eien ni)
- Advance! Donganden (進め!!ドンガンデン, Susume!! Donganden)
- Adventurous Baby Jim (冒険児ジム, Bōken Jijimu)
- Son of Godzilla, Monster Island Battle (怪獣島の決戦 ゴジラの息子, Kaijū Shima no Kessen Gojira no Musuko)
- There was a Black Summer (クロがいた夏, Kuro Gaita Natsu)
- Murasaki Shoku no Pika (むらさき色のピカ)
- Barefoot Gen (はだしのゲン, Hadashi no Gen; 1973–1987)

== See also ==
- White Light/Black Rain: The Destruction of Hiroshima and Nagasaki
