= Animated Classics of Japanese Literature =

Japanese anime television series

- Cover of The Harp of Burma and Season of the Sun North American release

住友生命 青春アニメ全集 (Sumitomo Seimei Seishun Anime Zenshū)
- Anime television series
- Directed by: Fumio Kurokawa
- Studio: Nippon Animation
- Licensed by: NA: Central Park Media
- Original network: NNS (NTV); TV Asahi (eps 33-34)
- Original run: 25 April 1986 – 26 December 1986
- Episodes: 34

The Animated Classics of Japanese Literature (Japanese: 住友生命 青春アニメ全集, Hepburn: Sumitomo Seimei Seishun Anime Zenshū; lit. Sumitomo Life Insurance Youth Anime Complete Collection) is an anime television series which aired on Nippon Television in Japan for 34 episodes from 25 April to 26 December 1986 in the 7–7:30 pm time slot. The series was unusual in that each episode (with only a couple of exceptions) was a stand-alone story based on popular and well known modern Japanese stories. The series was sponsored by Sumitomo Life Insurance.

The branch offices and agents of Sumitomo Life Insurance heavily promoted the series with posters in their offices as well as commercials directly after each episode.

== Synopsis ==
The title of the series was derived from the Nippon Animation series World Masterpiece Theater, creating a Japan Masterpiece Theater series. While each story would be told in 1–3 episodes, they shared a common theme of "modern Japanese classics", and were designed to emulate the success of the Princess Sarah series.

Each episode (or set of episodes) retells using animation a popular modern Japanese story from the past 100 years or so.

== List of episodes ==
Titles marked with ◎ were released by Shinchō Bunko in a manga form. Titles marked with ★ were part of the Anime Nihon no Meisaku (アニメ日本の名作) series released by Kin no Hoshi.

| No. | Title | Original release date |
|---|---|---|
| 1 | "The Dancing Girl of Izu" "Izu no Odoriko" (伊豆の踊子) | 25 April 1986 |
Based on the book by Yasunari Kawabata. ◎★
| 2 | "The Sound of Waves, Part 1: The Wakening of Spring" "Shiosai Zenpen: Haru no Mezame" (潮騒 前編 春のめざめ) | 2 May 1986 |
Based on the book by Yukio Mishima.
| 3 | "The Sound of Waves, Part 2: Summer Storm" "Shiosai Kōhen: Natsu no Arashi" (潮騒 後編 夏のあらし) | 9 May 1986 |
Based on the book by Yukio Mishima.
| 4 | "The Grave of the Wild Chrysanthemum" "Nogiku no Haka" (野菊の墓) | 16 May 1986 |
Based on the book by Itō Sachio. ◎★
| 5 | "The Wind Rises" "Kaze Tachinu" (風立ちぬ) | 23 May 1986 |
Based on the book by Tatsuo Hori. ★
| 6 | "The Fruit of Olympus" "Orinposu no Kajitsu" (オリンポスの果実) | 30 May 1986 |
Based on the book by Hidemitsu Tanaka.
| 7 | "Botchan, Part 1: The New Teacher Gets Angry!" "Botchan Zenpen: Shinnin Kyōshi Okoru!" (坊っちゃん 前編 新任教師怒る!) | 6 June 1986 |
Based on the book by Natsume Sōseki. ◎★
| 8 | "Botchan, Part 2: Exterminate the Redshirts!" "Botchan Kōhen: Akashatsu Daiji!" (坊っちゃん 後編 赤シャツ退治!) | 13 June 1986 |
Based on the book by Natsume Sōseki. ◎★
| 9 | "Wandering Days" "Hōrōki "Fūkin to Uonomachi" yori" (放浪記「風琴と魚の町」より) | 20 June 1986 |
Based on the book by Fumiko Hayashi.
| 10 | "The Dancing Girl" "Maihime" (舞姫) | 27 June 1986 |
Based on the book by Mori Ōgai. ★
| 11 | "Asunaro Story" "Asunaro Monogatari" (あすなろ物語) | 4 July 1986 |
Based on the book by Yasushi Inoue. ◎
| 12 | "A Stone by the Roadside, Part 1: Junior High Dreams" "Robō no Ishi Zenpen: Chūgaku Shibō" (路傍の石 前編 中学志望) | 18 July 1986 |
Based on the book by Yuzo Yamamoto. ◎★
| 13 | "A Stone by the Roadside, Part 2: Daily Heartbreak" "Robō no Ishi Kōhen: Tsurai Hibi" (路傍の石 後編 つらい日々) | 25 July 1986 |
Based on the book by Yuzo Yamamoto. ◎★
| 14 | "Growing Up" "Takekurabe" (たけくらべ) | 1 August 1986 |
Based on the book by Ichiyō Higuchi. ★
| 15 | "The Priest of Mt. Kōya" "Kōya Hijiri" (高野聖) | 8 August 1986 |
Based on the book by Kyōka Izumi.
| 16 | "Kwaidan: Hoichi the Earless" "Kaidan: Hōichi Monogatari" (怪談 芳一ものがたり) | 15 August 1986 |
Based on the book by Lafcadio Hearn. ★
| 17 | "The Incident in the Bedroom Suburb: Whispers are Forbidden" "Hōmutaun no Jikenbo: Shigo o Kinzu" (ホームタウンの事件簿 私語を禁ず) | 29 August 1986 |
Based on the short story by Jirō Akagawa.
| 18 | "The Incident in the Bedroom Suburb: A Voice from Heaven" "Hōmutaun no Jikenbo: Ten kara no Koe" (ホームタウンの事件簿 天からの声) | 5 September 1986 |
Based on the short story by Jirō Akagawa.
| 19 | "Theater of Life" "Jinsei Gekijō" (人生劇場) | 12 September 1986 |
Based on the book by Shirō Ozaki.
| 20 | "Season of the Sun" "Taiyō no Kiseki: Kiken na Seishun" (太陽の季節 危険な青春) | 19 September 1986 |
Based on the book by Shintarō Ishihara.
| 21 | "The Tale of Shunkin" "Shunkinshō: Kokoro no Ito Narimasu" (春琴抄 心の糸鳴ります) | 3 October 1986 |
Based on the book by Jun'ichirō Tanizaki.
| 22 | "Sanshiro Sugata Chapter 1: The Lucky Adventurer of the Kōdōkan Dojo" "Sugata Sanshirō Daichibu: Kōdōkan no Fūunji" (姿三四郎 第一部 紘道館の風雲児) | 17 October 1986 |
Based on the book by Tsuneo Tomita. ◎★
| 23 | "Sanshirō Sugata Chapter 2: Deadly Mountain Storm" "Sugata Sanshirō Dainibu: Hissatsu no Yamaarashi" (姿三四郎 第二部 必殺の山嵐) | 24 October 1986 |
Based on the book by Tsuneo Tomita. ◎★
| 24 | "Sanshirō Sugata Chapter 3: Showdown at Ukyōgahara" "Sugata Sanshirō Daisanbu: Ukyōgahara no Taiketsu" (姿三四郎 第三部 右京ヶ原の対決) | 31 October 1986 |
Based on the book by Tsuneo Tomita. ◎★
| 25 | "The Harp of Burma, Part 1: The Clay Hut" "Biruma no Tategoto Zenpen: Hanyū no Yado" (ビルマの竪琴 前編 埴生の宿) | 7 November 1986 |
Based on the book by Michio Takeyama. ◎★
| 26 | "The Harp of Burma, Part 2: Song of Farewell" "Biruma no Tategoto Kōhen: Wakare no Uta" (ビルマの竪琴 後編 別れのうた) | 14 November 1986 |
Based on the book by Michio Takeyama. ◎★
| 27 | "A Walker in the Attic" "Akechi Kogorō: Yane-ura no Sanpōsha" (明智小五郎 屋根裏の散歩者) | 21 November 1986 |
Based on the book by Rampo Edogawa. ◎
| 28 | "The Psychological Test" "Akechi Kogorō: Shinri Shiken" (明智小五郎 心理試験) | 28 November 1986 |
Based on the book by Rampo Edogawa. ◎
| 29 | "The Red Room" "Akechi Kogorō: Akai Heya" (明智小五郎 赤い部屋) | 5 December 1986 |
Based on the book by Rampo Edogawa.
| 30 | "The New Story of Tōno" "Shinshaku Tōno Monogatari" (新釈 遠野物語) | 12 December 1986 |
Based on the book by Hisashi Inoue.
| 31 | "The Martyr" "Ten ni Noboru Ai, "Hōkyōnin no Shi" yori" (天に昇る愛「奉教人の死」より) | 19 December 1986 |
Based on the book by Ryūnosuke Akutagawa.
| 32 | "The Story of Koyasu Dog" "Shiro, Kita e Kaeru, "Kōyasu Inu Monogatari" yori" (シロ、北へ帰る「高安犬物語」より) | 26 December 1986 |
Based on the book by Yukio Toda.
| 33 | "Student Days" "Gakusei Jidai" (学生時代) | 8 October 1987 |
Based on the book by Masao Kume.
| 34 | "Friendship" "Yūjō" (友情) | 15 October 1987 |
Based on the book by Saneatsu Mushanokōji.
