= Barefoot Gen 2 =

1986 film directed by Toshio Hirata

- DVD cover
- Kanji: はだしのゲン 2
- Revised Hepburn: Hadashi no Gen 2
- Directed by: Toshio Hirata
- Written by: Hideo Takayashiki
- Produced by: Takanori Yoshimoto; Yasuteru Iwase; Shōtarō Tanabe (Hiroshima Movie Center); Keiji Nakazawa
- Starring: Issei Miyazaki; Masaki Kōda; Yoshie Shimamura; Kei Nakamura; Takami Aoyama; Taeko Nakanishi
- Cinematography: Kin'ichi Ishikawa
- Edited by: Harutoshi Ogata
- Music by: Kentarō Haneda
- Production companies: Madhouse; Gen Production
- Distributed by: Eiga Center Zenkoku Renraku Kaigi
- Release date: 14 June 1986
- Running time: 85 minutes
- Country: Japan
- Language: Japanese

Barefoot Gen 2 (はだしのゲン2, Hadashi no Gen 2) is a 1986 Japanese adult animated drama film and the sequel to the 1983 animated war film Barefoot Gen, loosely based on the Japanese manga series by Keiji Nakazawa. Directed by Toshio Hirata, the film stars Issei Miyazaki, Masaki Kōda, Yoshie Shimamura, and Taeko Nakanishi, who reprise their roles from the first film, while Kei Nakamura and Takami Aoyama join the cast. In the film, Gen and Ryuta Nakaoka join a gang of orphan scavengers and attempt to save their mother Kimie from radiation sickness, a consequence of her survival of the Hiroshima atomic bombing.

== Plot ==
In 1948, three years after the atomic bombing of Hiroshima, Gen Nakaoka, his mother Kimie, and his adopted brother Ryuta are scavenging for food and scrap metal to sell in the black market as Hiroshima, like the rest of Japan, struggles to rebuild following World War II.

While Kimie starts working at a geta factory, Gen and Ryuta attend school in a ruined building, in which they meet a gang of orphaned children and their leader Masa in a hostile first encounter. Gen and Ryuta start a shoe-shining business that Masa's gang disrupts, drawing the attention of policemen who attempt to place them in an orphanage. The brothers fight off the police and hide with Masa and their gang in their shelter, where Gen learns that the orphans pickpocket in the black market in order to survive. Realizing Masa's desperation for quality life, Gen and Ryuta join his gang in solitude. Gen befriends Katsuko, one of the orphans who sustained serious burns in the bombing, and Masa's gang invites Suekichi, a retired journalist who lost his family in the Hiroshima bombing, to live with them. After Gen rallies the orphans into constructing a new home out of wood and other materials from abandoned buildings around town, they raid a potato field at night, but the field's farmers catch them and kill Katchin, a member of Masa's gang, as the orphans retreat.

Meanwhile, Gen notices that he can now give Kimie piggyback rides despite being much smaller than her, which leads him to suspect that her health is failing. He and Ryuta learn from doctors that because of the atomic bombing, she is suffering from radiation sickness that progressively worsens with time. Kimie begins to vomit blood after her children come home for dinner one evening, distressing Gen and prompting him to take her to a surgeon, who informs Gen that Kimie has only four months to live. Gen refuses to accept that his mother will die and tries to convince her to let him and Ryuta work in her place, but Kimie insists that she works out of fondness for Gen's late father and the lessons he taught, which moves Gen and Ryuta into assisting her with building geta.

Gen, Ryuta, and Masa attempt to steal copper from a shipyard to buy penicillin for Kimie, but their boat sinks as they return from the yard, forcing the trio to return to shore empty-handed. Later, they watch an improper burial of the victims of the nuclear attack by American soldiers, who chase the trio off. They, however, discover copper bullets in an abandoned firing range, and Ryuta gets Masa's gang to collect them into a wheelbarrow. Gen and Ryuta return home with money for the penicillin, but they discover that Kimie is dying and carry her to a hospital. Along the way, Kimie dies on Gen's back after urging him to live on without her.

Gen has Kimie cremated and plays with Ryuta, Masa, and the other orphans while reminiscing upon his parents' influence on his life.

== Cast ==
- Issei Miyazaki as Gen Nakaoka
- Masaki Kōda as Ryuta Nakaoka, Gen's younger adopted brother and Shinji Nakaoka, Gen's younger brother
- Yoshie Shimamura as Kimie Nakaoka, Gen's mother
- Kei Nakamura as Masa, the leader of a gang of orphans
- Takami Aoyama as Katsuko, one of Masa's companions
- Taeko Nakanishi as Hana
- Katsuji Mori as Seiji
- Junji Nishimura as Boku-san
- Kōichi Kitamura as Suekichi
- Seiko Nakano as Eiko Nakaoka, Gen's elder sister
- Takao Inoue as Daikichi Nakaoka, Gen's father

== Reception ==
=== Critical response ===
Writer and reporter, Ram Murata, described their experience watching Barefoot Gen 2 and recalled growing up with the body of work in Japan:

"It's a very sad story. But it's not all dark. Because of the style of the work, characters would often have comical expressions, making me laugh. This 'funny' thing is also troubling. Barefoot Gen has a strong aura that says you shouldn't be amused with it. I went to university in Kyushu, but I made friends there that were from Hiroshima. One of them was aiming to become a manga artist like myself, so we would talk and he would show me random cartoons he had drawn. One day, when I showed him [Barefoot Gen], he burst into anger. It was a story about a nuclear bomb, I realized. He told me, "Don't make fun of a nuclear bomb! I was beaten up by my father for just saying that the memorial service looked like an eraser at my parents' house". People have different views on the atomic bomb depending on the year they were born and the region [of Japan] they live in. Barefoot Gen is a rare work that looks directly at the topic, but it's still a manga. I think you can enjoy reading it. Please do laugh at the scene where Gen and others beat each other on the bottom to get used to the torture".

== See also ==
- Barefoot Gen (1983 film)
- Barefoot Gen (manga)
- Grave of the Fireflies
