= Burmese Harp =

Burmese Harp, or The Burmese Harp, may refer to:

- Burmese harp, or saung, a harp played in Burma
- The Burmese Harp, a 1946 Japanese children's novel by Michio Takeyama
- The Burmese Harp (1956 film), a Japanese film based on the book and directed by Kon Ichikawa
- The Burmese Harp (1985 film), a remake of the 1956 film by Kon Ichikawa
- The Harp of Burma, a 1986 Japanese animated television adaptation of the novel
