= Barefoot Gen (1983 film) =

1983 film

- Theatrical release poster
- Kana: はだしのゲン
- Revised Hepburn: Hadashi no Gen
- Directed by: Mori Masaki
- Screenplay by: Keiji Nakazawa
- Story by: Keiji Nakazawa
- Based on: Barefoot Gen by Keiji Nakazawa
- Produced by: Takanori Yoshimune; Yasutaka Iwase
- Starring: Issei Miyazaki; Masaki Kōda
- Cinematography: Kinichi Ishikawa
- Edited by: Harutoshi Ogata
- Music by: Kentarō Haneda
- Production companies: Madhouse; Gen Production
- Distributed by: Kyodo Eiga
- Release date: 21 July 1983 (Japan)
- Running time: 85 minutes
- Country: Japan
- Language: Japanese

Barefoot Gen (はだしのゲン, Hadashi no Gen) is a 1983 Japanese adult animated war drama film loosely based on the Japanese manga series of the same name by Keiji Nakazawa. Directed by Mori Masaki and starring Issei Miyazaki, Masaki Kōda and Tatsuya Jo, it depicts World War II in Japan from a child's point of view revolving around the events surrounding the bombing of Hiroshima and the main character's firsthand experience of the bomb.

Barefoot Gen was dubbed by Streamline Pictures in 1995, and was previously released in subbed format in the United States on June 13, 1992.

A sequel, Barefoot Gen 2, was released on June 14, 1986.

== Plot ==
Gen Nakaoka and his family live in Hiroshima, Japan during the final days of World War II. The family struggles through food shortages and constant air raid warnings. Gen's mother, Kimie, is pregnant and suffering from malnutrition, and his sister Eiko helps Kimie in her housework. Gen and his brother Shinji help their father, Daikichi, in the family's wheat field and try to find food for Kimie. Daikichi and Kimie realize the war is not going well, though they wonder why Hiroshima has been spared from the air raids which devastated other Japanese cities.

On August 6, 1945, Gen and a friend arrive at school just as a lone B-29 aircraft flies overhead and releases an atomic bomb, which destroys the city. Gen's friend is killed in the blast, while he is buried under rubble by the resulting shockwave and manages to survive. Gen finds Kimie trying to rescue their family, who are buried alive under their burning collapsed house, but Daikichi urges his son to take care of his mother and the baby. Daikichi, Eiko and Shinji burn to death as Kimie briefly suffers a mental breakdown. With help from a neighbor, Mr. Pak, the two find a safe location where Kimie gives birth to a baby girl, Tomoko. "Black rain" soon falls on the ruined city, the result of the bomb that sent radioactive material and debris into the atmosphere.

Gen spends the next few days searching for food for his family. He discovers that soldiers are distributing rice, but arrives to find them collecting corpses before burning them in mass graves. He takes a radiation poisoned soldier to a makeshift hospital, where the soldier dies. Gen loots a few bags of intact rice from a ration warehouse and takes them to his mother to eat along with some fresh vegetables. Kimie points out a few bald spots on her son's head, who recollects the memory of the soldier dying from the unknown illness. Gen has a mental breakdown from this recollection. Soon afterwards, on August 9, another atomic bomb is dropped over Nagasaki after Japan refuses to surrender following an ultimatum from the US government.

On August 15, Gen and Kimie dig up the remains of their family members from their former home, in which they learn from a nearby family that Japan has surrendered to the Allies, ending the war, but their prayers of peace came too late. They later take refuge in a makeshift shack where they try to live on what little food they have. A small boy, Ryuta, tries to steal their rice, but Gen catches him and is shocked at Ryuta's resemblance to Shinji. Gen and Kimie take Ryuta in after learning that Ryuta was orphaned by the bomb.

The next day, Gen and Ryuta look for food as Tomoko is suffering from malnutrition. A man gives them a job tending to his ill-tempered brother Seiji, another bomb survivor, for 10 yen a day, but the boys grow tired of the mistreatment, slap Seiji several times, and quit. Seiji begs them to come back, explaining to them that he is grateful that the boys treated him like more than a rotting corpse. Gen tells Ryuta to tell his mother where they are, and he spends the night with the man, which inspires him to paint once again. The man's brother pays them 100 yen and the boys head out to find milk for Tomoko. When they return home, they find that Tomoko is already dead.

A few weeks later, Gen and Ryuta see wheat beginning to grow despite having heard that grass would not grow. With renewed optimism, Gen, his mother, and Ryuta set a paper boat lantern down the river. They then watch and pray as the boat gently sails into the sunset.

== Cast ==
Cast by region
Character	Japanese voice actor	English voice actor (Streamline Pictures, 1995)
Gen Nakaoka	Issei Miyazaki	Catherine Battistone
Kimie Nakaoka	Yoshie Shimamura	Iona Morris
Shinji Nakaoka	Masaki Kōda	Brianne Siddall
Ryuta Kondo	Masaki Kōda	Barbara Goodson
Daikichi Nakaoka	Takao Inoue	Kirk Thornton
Eiko Nakaoka	Seiko Nakano	Wendee Lee
Hidezo	Takeshi Aono	Michael McConnohie
Mr. Pak	Junji Nishimura	Ardwight Chamberlain
Seiji Yoshida	Katsuji Mori	Dan Woren
Hana	Taeko Nakanishi	Joyce Kurtz
Narrator	Tatsuya Jō	Ardwight Chamberlain

== Release ==
Barefoot Gen was released in Japan on 21 July 1983 where it was distributed by Herald Enterprises. It was released in the United States on 13 June 1992, and dubbed by Streamline Pictures in 1995.

The Barefoot Gen anime made Time magazine's list of top five anime DVDs.

== Reception ==
The film review aggregator website Rotten Tomatoes reported a 71% approval rating based on 7 reviews with an average rating of 7.25/10.

== See also ==
- Grave of the Fireflies
