= Tales of Little Women =

1987 Japanese anime series

- Cover of the first volume of the Japanese DVD release by Bandai featuring the March sisters, clockwise from upper left: Jo, Meg (in chair), Amy, and Beth.
- 愛の若草物語
- Genre: Historical drama
- Based on: Little Women by Louisa May Alcott
- Screenplay by: Akira Miyazaki
- Directed by: Fumio Kurokawa
- Music by: Kazuo Ōtani
- Country of origin: Japan
- Original language: Japanese
- No. of episodes: 48

Production
- Executive producer: Koichi Motohashi
- Producers: Junzō Nakajima; Taihei Ishikawa (Fuji TV)
- Production companies: Fuji Television; Nippon Animation

Original release
- Network: FNS (Fuji TV)
- Release: January 11 – December 27, 1987

Tales of Little Women (愛の若草物語, Ai no Wakakusa Monogatari; "Love's Tale of Young Grass"), also simply known as Little Women, is a Japanese animated television series adaptation of Louisa May Alcott's 1868-69 two-volume novel Little Women, produced by Nippon Animation. It aired from January to December 1987 on Fuji Television and its affiliates as the 13th entry in the House Foods World Masterpiece Theater series.

A sequel series, Little Women II: Jo's Boys, premiered in 1993.

== Plot ==
The animated series is loosely derived from Part One and partly on the beginning of Part Two of the book, and introduces new material and characters. The series begins with the introduction of the March family happily living near Gettysburg (the nearby town of York in the English version), until one day during a picnic, Mr. March notices Confederate scouts at a riverbank. As an officer of the Union Army on leave with a broken arm, Mr. March hesitantly leaves his family to inform his superiors and to prepare for the upcoming battle. Meanwhile, his family endures the Confederate occupation and even helps a slave named John, who had been forcibly recruited to fight for the Confederacy, desert the Southern army by keeping him hidden until the Confederate's withdrawal from the city.

Eventually, Union forces arrive and in the ensuing battle the March family home is destroyed and their investment (which had also been their savings) stolen. With no other options, the family leaves Gettysburg to Newcord, where they hope to be taken by an estranged aunt of father. Upon arriving in Newcord, they are coldly received by the old woman and even less so by David, an egotistical nephew who constantly asks for loans and antagonizes the family. Despite the reception, Aunt March allows the family to stay at home until they can get back on their feet.

Determined to have a sense of normalcy and persevere their hardship, Meg finds work as a Governess while Jo alternates between being a companion to Aunt March and Author. During a sales pitch to sell a short story to a local newspaper, her work and her character are presumptuously criticized by Anthony, a local reporter. Upset and resolute, Jo throws herself into her writing ultimately earning the respect of Anthony and forms an amicable relationship.

In time, the March family moves into a new home and the events that follow begin to reference the plot of the original novel: the 18th episode is based on Chapter 3 and follows the first part of the book. The storyline from Chapter 1 (Christmas 1863) begins in episode 21.

== Characters ==
- Eiko Yamada (Heidi Lenhart in English dub) as Josephine "Jo" March (ジョセフィン「ジョオ」マーチ, Josefin "Jō" Māchi)
- Keiko Han as Margaret "Meg" March (マーガレット「メグ」マーチ, Māgaretto "Megu" Māchi)
- Mayumi Shou as Elizabeth "Beth" March (エリザベス「ベス」マーチ, Erizabesu "Besu" Māchi)
- Rei Sakuma (Rebecca Forstadt in English dub) as Amy March (エイミー・マーチ, Eimī Māchi)
- Nobuo Tobita (Joshua Seth in English Dub) as Theodore "Laurie" Lawrence (シオドア「ローリー」ローレンス, Shiodoa "Rōrī" Rōrensu)
- Taeko Nakanishi as Mary March (メアリー・マーチ, Mearī Māchi)
- Osamu Saka (Michael Forest in English dub) as Frederic March (フレデリック・マーチ, Furederikku Māchi)
- Hisako Okata (Barbara Goodson in English dub) as Hannah (ハンナ, Hanna), the March family's servant
- Kazuyuki Sogabe (Dave Mallow in English dub) as Anthony Boone (アンソニー・ブーン, Ansonī Būn)
- Ranko Mizuki (Melodee Spevack in English dub) as Martha March (マーサ・マーチ, Māsa Māchi)
- Kohei Miyauchi (Mike Reynolds in English dub) as James Lawrence (ジェームス・ローレンス, Jēmuzu Rōrensu)
- Toshihiko Kojima (Ardwight Chamberlain in English dub) as John Brooke (Carl Brooke (カール・ブルック, Kāru Burukku) in Japanese)
- Kozo Shioya as David Fowlet (デーヴィット・フォーレット, Dēvitto Fōretto)
- Ryuji Saikachi (Milton James in English dub) as Henry Murdoch (ヘンリー・マードック, Henrī Mādokku)
- Miyoko Aoba as Annie Moffatt (アニー・モファット, Anī Mofatto)
- Maria Kawamura (Wendee Lee in English dub) as Sallie Gardiner (サリー・ガルディナー, Sarī Garudinā)
- Toshihiko Seki (Dan Woren in English dub) as John (ジョン, Jon), the runaway slave
- Rumiko Ukai (Lara Cody in English dub) as Esther (エスター, Esutā), Aunt March's maid
- Asami Mukaidono as Dorothy (ドロシー, Doroshī), Aunt March's cook
- Masashi Hirose (Michael McConnohie in English dub) as Ben (ベン, Ben), Aunt March's coachman
- Fushigi Yamada as Polly (ポリー, Porī), Aunt March's pet bird (credited as Kyoko Yamada)

Writer Akira Miyazaki introduced several new supporting characters not in the original novel:

- Anthony Boone (アンソニー・ブーン, Ansonī Būn) is a Newcord reporter and friend of Jo's. He and Jo get off to a bad start when he criticizes her writing, but eventually become close friends, and Anthony helps her family find a new house in Newcord. He also encourages Jo to keep writing and improve. He leaves for New York in the second-to-last episode, and inspires Jo to do the same. In some episodes he appears to have feelings for Jo, who, in her single-minded quest to become a great writer, does not reciprocate or even seem to notice.
- Henry Murdoch (ヘンリー・マードック, Henrī Mādokku) (possibly named after Rupert Murdoch) is the owner and publisher of The Newcord Times, and Anthony's boss. He has a high opinion of Jo's talents and reassures her whenever she is discouraged by Anthony's criticisms.
- David Fowlet (デーヴィット・フォーレット, Dēviddo Fōretto) is Aunt March's nephew, a money-grubbing gambler and ne'er-do-well who appears only to care for his aunt because she loans him money. He antagonizes the March family, and Jo in particular, out of fear that he will lose his place as her sole heir.
- John Marty (ジョン・マーティー, Jon Mātī) is a runaway slave. In an early episode, the March family hide him in their house from Confederate soldiers. In a later episode, he returns and gets a job at the Newcord newspaper.
- Milky Ann (ミルキーアン, Mirukī An) is the March family's pet kitten. She first appears in episode two, when Beth discovers the abandoned kitten half-drowned and nearly frozen to death in the rain. Beth and her sisters nurse the kitten back to health, and Milky Ann becomes a treasured member of the family.
- Aunt March had several additional servants introduced in this anime in addition to Esther the maid, including Ben the coachman and Dorothy the cook (who appeared in only one episode). Also, in addition to her bird, Polly, Aunt March has a dog, a poodle named "Harry" (「ハリー」, "Harī").

=== Name and character changes ===
In addition to the town of Concord itself being renamed "Newcord" for the anime version (which carried over into the English dub), several characters also underwent name changes in this series. For example, the March parents, named Margaret and Robert in the original novel, are Mary and Frederic in this series, and Mr. Brooke is renamed from John to Carl in Japanese and some of the European dub versions (although the English dubbers changed his name back to John). Also, the March family's live-in help, Hannah, is African-American in this version instead of Irish and Eurocentric/White, perhaps to draw more attention with Japanese viewers to the plight of Black Americans in the 19th century.

== Broadcast and home media ==
Little Women aired on Fuji Television from 11 January to 27 December 1987 as part of Nippon Animation's World Masterpiece Theater. The series features contributions from several well-known Studio Ghibli staffers, including co-character designer Yoshifumi Kondo and animation director Atsuko Otani. The chief director was Nippon Animation/WMT veteran Fumio Kurokawa with storyboard duties handled by various other directors, and Akira Miyazaki is credited with scripting all 48 episodes. Kurokawa, Otani, and character designer and chief animation director Toshiki Yamazaki had all been involved in the previous WMT series Princess Sarah, as had Jo's voice actress, Eiko Yamada. The series was broadcast aired across Asia by the anime satellite television network, Animax.

Little Women was first dubbed into English by Saban Entertainment and was broadcast across the United States by the pay-TV channel HBO in 1988 under the title Tales of Little Women, making it one of only three WMT serials to have been broadcast on television in the United States. From 2009 to 2017, the series aired in the United States on TBN's now-defunct Smile of a Child and in the Philippines on DZOZ-DTV (Light TV). Unusual for a Saban Entertainment dub of an anime series, the English dub version of Ai no Wakakusa Monogatari kept the original Japanese musical score by Kazuo Otani, although the theme songs were replaced with a new one by Haim Saban and Shuki Levy, who also composed some additional music for the series itself. The series has not yet been released on DVD in English, although a compilation of two episodes was released on VHS in the United States in 1992 as Little Women's Christmas Story. The full series was released in 2017 on Amazon Prime under the title Tales Of Little Women.

The series has also achieved a high level of popularity in Europe, Middle East & North Africa and Latin America.

== Staff ==
- Original work: Little Women by Louisa May Alcott
- Executive producer: Koichi Motohashi
- Producer: Junzo Nakajima (Nippon Animation), Taihei Ishikawa (Fuji TV)
- Planning: Shoji Sato (Nippon Animation), Eiichi Kubota (Fuji TV)
- Director: Fumio Kurokawa
- Script: Akira Miyazaki
- Storyboards: Yoshio Kuroda, Fumio Kurokawa, Norio Yazawa, Shinichi Tsuji, Kozo Kuzuha, Hiromi Sugimura, Shinichi Matsumi, Takeshi Yamaguchi, Eiji Okabe, Shigeo Koshi, Takao Yotsuji, Shin Namioka, Fumio Ikeno
- Character design: Yoshifumi Kondo, Toshiki Yamazaki
- Animation director: Toshiki Yamazaki, Takumi Koyama, Atsuko Onuki
- Art director: Masamichi Takano
- Color coordination: Akiko Koyama
- Editing: Hidetoshi Kadono, Shinichi Natori, Yoshihiro Kasahara
- Layout: Shohei Kawamoto
- Director of photography: Toshiaki Morita
- Recording director: Etsuji Yamada
- Music: Kazuo Otani
- Production desk: Shunichi Kosao
- Production manager: Mitsuru Takakuwa
- Sound effects: Akihiko Matsuda
- Special effects: Masao Yoshiyama
- Production: Nippon Animation, Fuji TV

== Theme songs ==
Opening themes

1. Invitation of Young Grass (若草の招待状, Wakakusa no Shōtaijō) (eps 1-14)
  - Singer: Eri Nitta
  - Lyricist: Yasushi Akimoto
  - Composer: Toshihiko Takamizawa
  - Arranger: Jun Satō
2. Someday, for Sure! (いつかきっと!, Itsuka Kitto!) (eps 15-48)
  - Singers: Keiko Han, Eiko Yamada, Mayumi Shō, Rei Sakuma
  - Lyricist: Yumi Ōkubo
  - Composer: Kōichi Morita
  - Arranger: Kazuo Ōtani

Ending themes

1. Sunset, Wind and Melody (夕陽と風とメロディ, Yūhi to Kaze to Merodi) (eps 1-14)
  - Singer: Eri Nitta
  - Lyricist: Keiko Asō
  - Composer and arranger: Masataka Matsutōya
2. A Lullaby for Father (お父さまへのララバイ, Otōsama e no Rarabai) (eps 15-48)
  - Singer: Satoko Shimonari
  - Lyricist: Yumi Ōkubo
  - Composer and arranger: Kōichi Morita

== Episode list ==
Toshiki Yamazaki is animation director for the first five episodes, for odd-numbered episodes 7 through 17, and for even-numbered episodes 20 through 48. Takumi Koyama is animation director for even-numbered episodes 6 through 16 and for odd-numbered episodes 19 through 47. Atsuko Otani is animation director for episode 18 only.

All episodes are written by Akira Miyazaki.

All episodes are directed by Fumio Kurokawa, who also drew storyboards for episodes 2, 3, and 48. Other storyboard artists include:

- Yoshio Kuroda (1, 28, co-storyboard duties on episode 31)
- Norio Yazawa (4, 7, 9)
- Shinichi Tsuji (5, 8, 12, 14, 18, 22, 26, 29, 32, 35, 38, 42, 44, 47)
- Kozo Kuzuha (6, 11, 15, 17, 20, 25)
- Hiromi Sugimura (13, 19, 30, 34, 37, and co-storyboarded episodes 10, 23, 31)
- Shinichi Matsumi (co-storyboarded episodes 10 and 16)
- Takeshi Yamaguchi (co-storyboarded episodes 16 and 23)
- Eiji Okabe (21, 24)
- Shigeo Koshi (27, 33, 40)
- Shin Namioka (39, 41)
- Takao Yotsuji (36)
- Fumio Ikeno (43, 45, 46)

No.	Title	English Title	Original release date
1	"Papa Came Home!!"; Transliteration: "Papa ga kaette kita!!" (Japanese: パパが帰って来た！！)	The March Family	January 11, 1987
Frederick March, after getting wounded in battle during the civil war, has come home to his beautiful family of Mary March, his dear wife and 4 daughters, Amy, Meg, Beth and Jo. They all go to a picnic. But there they confirm spotting confederate soldiers doing their scouting operation. The family depart for home immediately.
2	"Milky Ann Has Been Found"; Transliteration: "Mirukī An o hirouta" (Japanese: ミルキー・アンを拾った)	The War Draws Closer	January 18, 1987
Frederick March leaves only after a day of stay. Before that, he was sure to tell his supervisors about the enemies' positions and told his wife to get the family ready to leave for new court to Aunt March's house if any hostile action may seem imminent from them. A week later, the kind Beth finds a sick and soaked kitten, takes it home and names it Milky Ann.
3	"Watch Out! Escape Quickly!!"; Transliteration: "Abunai! Hayaku nigete!!" (Japanese: あぶない！早く逃げて！！)	The Deserter / The Hidden Guest	January 25, 1987
After the confederates soldiers took over their town to stock up on their recources, a runaway confederate slave shelters in the residence of the March and Mama March lets him hide, notwithstanding all the dangers.
4	"The Battle Begins!"; Transliteration: "Sensō ga hajimaru!" (Japanese: 戦争がはじまる！)	The Gift of Freedom	February 1, 1987
The March family are successful in eluding the confederate soldiers in their vain effort to find the slave. The slave named John then runs away free. Later on, Meg gets her dress for a party she's been wanting to go to.
5	"The Town Burns Down!"; Transliteration: "Machi ga moete shimau!" (Japanese: 町が燃えてしまう！)	The Friendship Pin	February 8, 1987
As the Battle of Gettysburg draws near, Mama March strongly considers leaving for where Aunt March lives in Massachusetts.
6	"Goodbye Hometown!"; Transliteration: "Sayonara furusato!" (Japanese: さよなら ふるさと！)	Running from the War	February 15, 1987
With the battle of Gettysburg ending and the hometown of the March sisters getting conflagrated in the ensuing afterfight, which the sisters saw from some distance, they have nowhere to go, as their house was turned to ash and not much remaining. At that moment, their father Frederick arrives and informs Mama March that their life savings also have been wrecked. Notwithstanding, they hold hope that they will better fate in the coming days. And with that, they caught the train to Aunt March's home. While going there, Jo finds their hidden guest John, the ex-slave and help him again to get off from the train at convenient place.
7	"Auntie is Ill-Tempered!"; Transliteration: "Obasama wa ijiwaru!" (Japanese: おば様はいじわる！)	The Unwelcome Mat	February 22, 1987
After seeing no one there to pick them up at the statipn, the March family go to Aunt March's themselves. There they meet the unscrupulous money-grabbing David Forrest, a distant relative to them and the ill-tempered Aunt March. Initially, she was cold, distant and not intending to give them lodging to even stay for the night. But after having a talk with David about him needing money again, she immediately fetches the Marches back, realizing how unfairly she treated them.
8	"A Loan for a House, Please!"; Transliteration: "Oie o kashite kudasai!" (Japanese: お家を貸して下さい！)	Living With Aunt March	March 1, 1987
The March sisters have started to live under the militaristic rules of the fickle-minded Aunt March. They are told by Mama March about they're dire financial situation and the need to find a house as soon as possible. Until then, they must do the cores round the house to earn their keep. Moreover, the snooping-around David guy would also like the March family to leave as he thinks they might become a thorn in his inheritance plans.
9	"Short-Tempered Jo!"; Transliteration: "Okorinbō no Jō!" (Japanese: 怒りん坊のジョオ！)	Nice Work If You Can Get It	March 8, 1987
Jo goes to the local news office to print an ad for her sisters' governess job and also to publish her novel first time. But her bubble gets popped by the story editor Anthony who calls her lack of age as proof of her work being trash, making Jo furious and stomp out the office with utmost rage.
10	"Praise and Critiques"; Transliteration: "Homerarete kenasarete" (Japanese: ほめられて けなされて)	Jo's Civil War Stories	March 15, 1987
Anthony does come back the very next day, to say that some much needed appreciation about her writing style and would like her to write more about her personal experiences. And he critiques her fantastical writing choices. Both of which was a hard pill to swallow for Jo. But he does give a good news, that even before posting the ad, Meg seemed to have found a possible for the nanny position she always wanted.
11	"Aunt Martha is Pitiful!"; Transliteration: "Māsa-obasama wa okinodoku!" (Japanese: マーサおば様はお気の毒！)	A Heart to Heart Talk	March 22, 1987
After seeing in the papers the altered narration about Jo's experience fleeing from home town, Aunt March takes Jo for a stroll. There they have a heart to heart, enlightening talk about how Aunt March used to see Jo as her own son, the falling out they had after him leaving the house and also how the following experience and her husband's death has made her bitter and cruel. After that, they return, with Jo promising not to ever divulge of this discussion to anyone.
12	"I Hate Thunder!"; Transliteration: "Ikazuchi nante daikirai!" (Japanese: 雷なんて大嫌い！)	The Worn-Out Welcome	March 29, 1987
David the scumbag has spread all sorts of rumour about the family ti auntie march and frankly because, feeling indignified because of that, Jo takes it upon herself to find a house pronto. Soon she finds a good lead, under an oak tree, during a thunderstorm, from none other than Anthony, the newspaper story column editor.
13	"Our Strange House"; Transliteration: "Watashitachi no hennaie" (Japanese: 私たちの変な家)	A Home At Last	April 5, 1987
According to the instructions, Jo visits the house, likes it and the family buys. Before moving, aunt march prepares a housewarming gift for them according to mama march's liking. And then, aunt march also requests Jo to come to her as a companion each day in exchange for some money. Most of all, beth is happy to get a piano in the new house.
14	"Amy and Bad Friends"; Transliteration: "Eimī to nikui tomodachi" (Japanese: エイミーと悪い友だち)	New Friends / A New Life In A New Town	April 12, 1987
With everything settling with the new residence of the march sisters, amy is again starting her school life. There she faces the strict rule of the teacher, mr. davis and also the invitation to join the secret candy club. She is titillated by the proposal of trying contraband stuff, but due to beth against it, she doesn't go forward. Later on, Mr. Lawrence, the gruff resident beside march's house brings home, his heir, his dear grandson, theodore lawrence.
15	"The Strange Boy Next Door!"; Transliteration: "Otonari kara nozoku fushigina shōnen!" (Japanese: お隣からのぞく不思議な少年！)	The Boy Next Door	April 19, 1987
Day by day, the monotonous nature of young lawrence's house bores him and day by day, he just can't stop himself get more curious about the four sisters living in the house right next door.
16	"Terrible! Meg is Not a Thief!!"; Transliteration: "Hidoi! Megu wa dorobō nanka jinai!!" (Japanese: ひどい！メグは泥棒なんかじゃない！！)	Meg's First Dance	April 26, 1987
Meg can't wait to get an invitation of the dance party through sally. But that all gets dashed when david forrester, the scoundrel gives an ill-put advice about not trusting meg to go to the ball, so he can get the money to gamble from the son of the king family. And more dreadfully, the blame for the stealing of those 200 dollars falls on her. If patty hadn't come with name of the real perpetrator, meg wouldn't lost her job. Meg still goes home that day with a heavy heart.
17	"Jo and President Lincoln's Speech!"; Transliteration: "Jō to Rinkān-daitōryō no enzetsu!" (Japanese: ジョオとリンカーン大統領の演説！)	Lincoln's Gettysburg Address	May 3, 1987
Jo immediately asks Meg to resign her position of being a governess, but she refuses saying they need the money. So, Jo this time goes to her aunt march's house with a furious heart, but there was a commotion of aunt march having angina, so Jo makes sure to the stubborn old lady gets the care she needs. Later, the aunt tells mama march that she'll be bequeathing half of her property to the march sisters.
18	"Meg and Jo's Debut at the Ball!?"; Transliteration: "Megu to Jō butōkai ni debyū!?" (Japanese: メグとジョオ舞踏会にデビュー！？)	Invitation to the Dance	May 10, 1987
Jo and Meg finally get an invitation to a dance ball, sponsored by Sally Gardener. After going there, Jo is feeling embarrassed to dance in her pathcy dress, so she hides behind the curtains, where she finally meets Theodore Lawrence or Laurie, the bot next door.
19	"The Burnt Dress and the Nice Gentleman"; Transliteration: "Okoge dress to sutekina shinshi" (Japanese: おこげドレスと素敵な紳士)	A Formal Affair	May 17, 1987
Laurie and Jo connect with past experiences and shared mentalities. Later she and Laurie share a german dance in an empty room. Later, Meg comes in with a sprained ankle and laurie, upon introducing himself, arranges the coach to take the march sisters to their home.
20	"Vigorous Jo's Visit!"; Transliteration: "Jō no mimai wa genki ippai!" (Japanese: ジョオのお見舞いは元気いっぱい！)	A Neighbor In Need	May 24, 1987
Jo visits Laurie after he recovered from a cold with cake treat and milky ann. There she invites him for the christmas after party at the marche house. Later she meets the stern-looking, grandpa lawrence with whom she enjoys a brief tea time.
21	"Announcement! Jo's Enthusiastic Work of Self-Confidence"; Transliteration: "Happyō! Harikiri Jō no jishin saku" (Japanese: 発表！はりきりジョオの自信作)	One Dollar Christmas Presents	May 31, 1987
After getting a fresh christmas tree from laurie's with laurie's help, the march sisters were practicing for their play when aunt march showed up and gave them 1 dollar each as christmas presents. Initially, they wanted to buy stuff for themselves, but then they decided to buy only for their marmee. After doing that, marmee comes back and gives them an idea, where they all would write letters of their christmas experiences to father so that memory can be shared.
22	"A Hungry Christmas"; Transliteration: "Onakanosuita Kurisumasu" (Japanese: おなかのすいたクリスマス)	A Christmas Dinner	June 7, 1987
The march sisters wake up om christmas day and find their presents under their beds, which a bible for each with different colored covers. After that, when marmee came back to have breakfast with them, she told them the utter destitute situation of the poor family, so march sisters gave away their breakfast meal to them. Back home, they got a letter from father through anthony and would have to later cancel as none of the other three were quite prepared for it. Laurie comes anyway and gives them a hearty dinner meal for the charity they did at morning.
23	"Beth! The Great Joy of an Unexpected Gift!!"; Transliteration: "Besu! Omoigakenai okurimono ni ōyorokobi!!" (Japanese: ベス！思いがけない贈物に大喜び！！)	A "Grand" Offer	June 14, 1987
Jo & amy get invited to lawrence residence. There they learn about mr. Lawrence's desire to break the ice between the neighbouring families. Then laurie plays the grand piano in their home & cries while doing it. He says that's because there's much sad memories attached to it. He also tells of his & his grandfather's conflict regarding laurie's career choices. Back at home, beth is dying to play that grand piano & no sooner than that, mr. Lawrence comes to offer her a chance. It was a like a dream fulfilled to her.
24	"The Beginning of Meg's Little Love?"; Transliteration: "Megu no chīsana koi no hajimari?" (Japanese: メグの小さな恋のはじまり？)	Lost in the Music	June 21, 1987
The bashful beth finally goes to mr. lawrence's house and becomes absorbed in melody making. Seeing that she won't be getting up easily, Jo goes to run an errand to the newspaper's office to give the owner henry another story and surprisingly for her she got paid for that immediately. As beth would still be playing, meg went there to get her and met john brooker, laurie's tutor and both of them instantly took a fancy of each other.
25	"Novelist Jo's $2 Masterpiece!"; Transliteration: "Shōsetsuka Jō no kessaku!" (Japanese: 小説家ジョオの2ドルの傑作！)	Jo Shares Her Fortune	June 28, 1987
Jo spends her earnings to buy herself and amy a pair of ice-skates. And the remaining is spent on buying sewing materials for Beth to make a pair of slippers for mr. Lawrence as token of gratitude for innumerable chances to play violin at his house.
26	"Shy Beth and the Old Gentleman Next Door"; Transliteration: "Kowagari Besu to otonari no oi shinshi" (Japanese: 怖がりベスとお隣の老紳士)	It's Downright Upright	July 5, 1987
Mr. Lawrence seeing how much Beth loves playing piano at his house, just goes extra length and gives a newly bought to her house.
27	"Amy is Punished at School!"; Transliteration: "Gakkō de oshiokisareata Eimī!" (Japanese: 学校でお仕置されたエイミー！)	Forbidden Sweets	July 12, 1987
Amy with beth's money finally acquires some pickled lime for her friends at the school. But one crass girl named jenny snitches about that to the teacher, mr. davies and amy gets severely punished for it. She leaves school immediately but laurie finds her and encourages her to face it head-on and take responsibility and amy does so.
28	"Amy! What Are You Doing!"; Transliteration: "Eimī! Nante koto suru no!" (Japanese: エイミー！なんてことするの！)	Amy's Revenge	August 2, 1987
Amy wants to go the play where Laurie has invited both meg and Jo. But she's vehemently denied by Jo. Angered by that refusal, Amy goes to jo's room and throws every single one of Jo's written manuscripts page by page.
29	"Don't Die! Amy Has Fallen in the River!"; Transliteration: "Shina naide! Eimī ga kawa ni ochita!" (Japanese: 死なないで！エイミーが川に落ちた!)	Skating on Thin Ice	August 9, 1987
Amy has been trying make up with Jo for a week, but she's not budging. So, she goes to the ice-skating lake with Jo and laurie, but falls when not knowing that the middle part was thin ice. She's rescued as soon as possible, but faints due to cold shock. But at least unconscious, she does Jo saying that she was forgiven.
30	"I Wish I Could Say I'm Sorry!"; Transliteration: "Kowagari Besu to otonari no rō shinshi" (Japanese: 怖がりベスとお隣の老紳士)	Forgive And Forget	August 16, 1987
Amy is recuperating from her sickness and Jo is at her home vehemently blaming her self for what happened. Marmee goes to her room, advises about controlling her temper and with that Jo and Amy make up for their differences. Later, meg leaves for a 2 week vacation to a friend's house called annie moffat.
31	"Meg is Not a Doll!"; Transliteration: "Meg wa kisekaeningyou ja nai!" (Japanese: メグはきせかえ人形じゃない！)	Out of Character	August 30, 1987
Meg is at the mofatt house just getting pampered endlessly and treated like a doll, just so they can get a establish a contact with Laurie through her. Then, the family hears about this through a letter of hers and laurie is urged to go there to see about her affairs. Laurie goes and doesn't like how meg is being presented, so protests about it. Though initially meg isn't down to it, she does understand how this change shouldn't be adopted by her and she should still remain down to earth.
32	"Aunt Martha is a Worrywart"; Transliteration: "Komata Māsa-obasan no seikaku" (Japanese: 困ったマーサおばさんの性格)	Jo's Spoiled Plans	September 6, 1987
Aunt march has gone for some mineral bath for 1 month, which leaves Jo with a whole month of vacation time. She was gonna have some grand time doing canoeing with laurie and seeing plays with anthony. But only after a rowing experience, she's told that aunt march had changed her plans and she would be coming home soon, thereby ruining Jo's plans.
33	"A Fun, Fun Outdoor Party!"; Transliteration: "Tanoshī tanoshī yagai pāti da!" (Japanese: 楽しい楽しい野外パーティだ！)	Laurie's Lake Party	September 13, 1987
With summer vacation upon them, the four sisters, laurie, Mr. Brooke, thomas(brooke's little brother) and also anthony go to day-long lake side party, where they have profound amount of fun.
34	"Amy Had a Bad Dream!"; Transliteration: "Eimī wa nikui yumewomita!" (Japanese: エイミーは悪い夢を見た！)	Amy's Nightmare	September 20, 1987
Amy has a nice time having a disappointing fishing excursion with lil' thomas all day, until, he's called back home.
35	"Meg, So That's Love!!"; Transliteration: "Megu, sore wa yappari koi na no yo!!" (Japanese: メグ、それはやっぱり恋なのよ！！)	Meg Falls In Love	September 27, 1987
Meg can't sleep and Jo knows the reason, which is, her elder sister has fallen in love John Brooke, who happens to be a not possessing of favourable financial situation. Jo keeps teasing her about but Meg can't put up with it. Later, Jo meets the ex-confederate army slave John Murphy more than a year back. Jo takes him to the newspaper office so he can get a job and also to deliver a surefire story that she thinks anthony would have to consider appropriate to be published.
36	"Jo's Story is in the Newspaper!"; Transliteration: "Jō no shōsetsu ga shinbunninota!" (Japanese: ジョオの小説が新聞にのった！)	Jo in Black and White	October 4, 1987
Jo's story finally gets published in the newspaper and she gives anthony, in appreciation, a big flying hug.
37	"Father is Dying... Jo Sells Her Hair!"; Transliteration: "Chichi kitoku... Jō ga kami wo utta!" (Japanese: チチキトク・・・ジョオが髪を売った！？)	A Small Price To Pay	October 11, 1987
A somber telegram comes from Washington saying that frederick march has fallen ill and marmee would need to go there immediately. Everyone decides to chip in to help. Mr. Brooke decides to go there as a companion for mama march. Lastly, along with many financial help, Jo decides to sell her own hair in exchange for 25$ so marmee's 1 month long stay can be most convenient.
38	"The Telegram of Bad News!"; Transliteration: "Warui shirase no denpo ga kita!" (Japanese: 悪い知らせの電報がきた！)	A Sign Of Hope	October 18, 1987
After some gloomy time of marmee being absent in the march's household finally news come from her that father march is fine. He was just suffering from mild typhoid fever after getting injured from shrapnel.
39	"Letters, Letters, Letters We All Wrote"; Transliteration: "Minna ga kaita tegami, tegami, tegami" (Japanese: みんなが書いた手紙、手紙、手紙)	Letters From Home	October 25, 1987
With Marmee gone and her warm touch also being receded, the only thing the March sisters can do now is to establish major mail correspondence with them, while they are away in Washington, with John Brooke, helping all the war wounded. As mentioned before, John Brooke has started writing slightly intimate and emotional letters to meg, 1 one of whom got mixed up with letters addressed to Mr. Lawrence. Knowing that, Jo and Laurie quickly fix up the whole trouble before any embarrassment could follow.
40	"Beth Caught the Scarlet Fever!"; Transliteration: "Besu ga shokonetsu ni kakatta!" (Japanese: ベスが猩紅熱にかかった！)	Scarlet Fever	November 1, 1987
Beth with her to be ever so unselfish caught scarlet fever from a dying baby in the hummel's house. To not alarm, her mother Jo decides to notify of beth's terrible illness. And she also decides to send amy to aunt marche's so herself doesn't catch the illness.
41	"Mother, Come Home Quickly!"; Transliteration: "Okāsama hayaku kaette ki te" (Japanese: お母さま早く帰ってきて！)	Marmee, Come Back!	November 8, 1987
Meg's condition has worsened to the point it has become a necessity to wire marmee immediately, informing her to come back.
42	"God, Please Save Beth!"; Transliteration: "Kamisama, dōka Besu o tasukete!" (Japanese: 神様、どうかベスを助けて！)	Shout For Joy	November 15, 1987
In beth's worsening condition, the doctor warns that if the fever doesn't subside by midnight, things could look dire for her. The fever does subside and marmee comes back from washington the very next day.
43	"Go to New York, Jo!"; Transliteration: "Daitokai Nyūyōku e ikō! Jō" (Japanese: 大都会ニューヨークへ行こう！ジョオ)	In Search Of A Dream	November 22, 1987
Beth is getting better gradually and also they get news that father march would be coming home around christmas time. Around that time, Jo gets a career rocketing proposal from anthony, in which he tells to Jo to go with her to new york so she can make a grand career of her writing ability. Jo finds this overwhelming and starts pondering.
44	"The Case of the Fake Letter - Who's the Culprit?"; Transliteration: "Nise tegami jiken - hannin wa dareka?" (Japanese: ニセ手紙事件・犯人は誰か？)	The Case Of The Forged Letter	November 29, 1987
Laurie actually tried to forge a love letter addressed to meg directly which he claimed john brooke hand delivered to him himself. He attempted to do it as that would make him the right one after having an argument regarding meg and john's rumoured mutual feelings. He does get caught and apologizes for that profusely.
45	"Grandfather Hit Laurie!"; Transliteration: "Ojisama ga Rōrī o nagutta!" (Japanese: おじいさまがローリーをなぐった！)	Laurie Pays the Price	December 6, 1987
Mr. Lawrecne has heard about the commotion regarding laurie with the forged letter. He wanted to ask laurie about it but he doesn't divulge any information regarding it. So, in anger, grandpa got to hit laurie and after that they both locked themselves in their rooms. Jo then goes there and makes peace between them before laurie did anything drastic.
46	"An Unexpected Christmas Present"; Transliteration: "Omoigakenai Kurisumasu puresento" (Japanese: 思いがけないクリスマスプレゼント)	A Very Merry Christmas	December 13, 1987
In the lead up to the christmas day, a couple of things happen aunt march gives 2 dollars to each of the march sisters. Jo and Laurie make an ice sculpture for beth and the piece de resistance, frederick march returns home 2&1/2 years later.
47	"Goodbye, Anthony!"; Transliteration: "Sayonara! Ansonī" (Japanese: さよなら！アンソニー)	The Proposal	December 20, 1987
The march's houses encounters one emotional experience after another. First, John Brooke asks for Meg's hand in marriage and although initially reluctant, she does cave in to her passion and with a kiss accepts the proposal. As he was much to both papa march and marmee, they also accept it. Aunt march meets her son-like-nephew frederick, after 20 years. Lastly, anthony leaves for new york, the publishing capital of the world and Jo tearfuly bids him goodbye.
48	"Springtime! Everyone Sets Out"; Transliteration: "Haru! Sorezore no tabidachi" (Japanese: 春！それぞれの旅立ち)	The End, And A Beginning	December 27, 1987
After making everyone agree and arranging her affairs in order, Jo has a big feast at the march with the whole family, accompanied by her soon-to-be brother on law, laurie, mr. lawrence and aunt march. The feast became more jolly with the news of the war ending and pictures taken of the whole family by none other than cousin david. After that is done, Laurie takes Jo to the station where Jo would depart for new york, soon to be embarking on a new chapter of her life.

== Alternative titles ==
- Ai no Wakakusa Monogatari (Japanese)
- As Mulherzinhas (Portuguese)
- Eine fröhliche Familie (German)
- Les Quatre Filles du Dr March (French)
- Love's Tale of Young Grass (English)
- Mujercitas (Spanish)
- נשים קטנות Nashim Ktanot (Hebrew)
- Onder Moeders Vleugels (Dutch)
- Piccole donne (Italian)
- Tale of Love's Young Shoots (English)
- Tales of the Little Women (English)
- Una per tutte, tutte per una (Italian)
- Маленькие женщины (Russian)
- زنان کوچک (Persian)
- نساء صغيرات (Arabic)
- 小婦人 (Chinese)
- 愛の若草物語 (Japanese)
- 작은 아씨들 Jag-eun Assideul (Korean)

== See also ==
- Little Women (1981 TV series), Toei Animation's adaptation of Louisa May Alcott's novel.
