= Issei Miyazaki =

Japanese voice actor

Issei Miyazaki (宮崎 一成, Miyazaki Issei, born May 31, 1971 in Asaminami, Hiroshima, Hiroshima) is a Japanese voice actor and kannushi. He is the member of TAB Production.

== Voice roles ==
- Gen in Barefoot Gen and Barefoot Gen 2
- Ogasawara Yuunosuke in Azuki-chan
- Takashi Yamazaki in Cardcaptor Sakura
- Kenji Ninomiya in Kamichu!
- Subaru Sumeragi in X/1999
- Jun Misugi in Captain Tsubasa (Road to 2002)
- Sin in Guilty Gear 2: Overture, Guilty Gear Xrd, Guilty Gear Strive, Guilty Gear Strive: Dual Rulers
- Ichirō Sumishiba in Dragon Drive
- Uchida Kazuhiro in Yomigaeru Sora – Rescue Wings

=== Drama CDs ===
- GENE Tenshi wa Sakareru (Raka)
- Love Mode (Naoya Shirakawa)
- Soshite Koi ga Hajimaru (Miki Tamura)
