= That's My Doc =

- Title card (only used at year 2007)
- Genre: Sitcom
- Created by: ABS-CBN Studios
- Written by: Rhandy Reyes
- Directed by: Danni Caparas
- Starring: Aga Muhlach
- Country of origin: Philippines
- Original language: Filipino
- No. of episodes: 61

Production
- Executive producers: Carlo Katigbak; Cory Vidanes; Laurenti Dyogi
- Producer: Mark Anthony Gile
- Running time: 45 minutes

Original release
- Network: ABS-CBN
- Release: July 29, 2007 – October 4, 2008

That's My Doc is a Philippine television sitcom series broadcast by ABS-CBN. It stars Aga Muhlach, it aired from July 29, 2007 to October 4, 2008, and was replaced by Banana Split. It served as a reboot of Oki Doki Doc.

== Synopsis ==
This time, Dr. Agaton will play as a pediatrician, who decided to seek greener pastures in the United States by becoming a nurse. As it is his personal mission to help other people, Agaton gradually made his way up, and soon, he was recognized as one of the best nurses in the hospital he's working in! However, it seems that fame and fortune are unable to fill the longing in Agaton's heart. A pang of homesickness sets in, and he eventually decides to go back to the Philippines, and take a vacation with his Tita Ocs, his childhood guardian, while his own parents were in the States. Will he find what he's looking for here in the country?

== Cast ==
=== Main Cast ===
- Aga Muhlach as Dr. Agaton "Doc Aga" Abogado - He is a pediatrician who sought greener pastures in the United States as a nurse but returned to the Philippines after a pang of homesickness and a quest for the true meaning of life hit him.

=== Supporting Cast ===
- Nova Villa as Octavella "Tita Ocs" Flores - She is Aga's aunt who is the community's "Jill of All Trades".
- Raffy De Lara as Osmundo Flores - He is Tita Ocs' husband.
- Roderick Paulate as Major Ret Retualo - He is Aga's nemesis in the neighborhood. He's a ex-military officer who stands as Tabuneknek's leader.
- Precious Lara Quigaman as Greta Retualo - She is the sister of Major Ret Retualo and the neighborhood's "Crush ng Bayan".
- Bayani Agbayani as Buddy - He is a pet shop owner in town.
- Pokwang as Cita - She is Buddy's unrequited love interest. They have an adopted pet chimp named Kokong.
- Eda Nolan as Eda - She is the town's fashionist.
- Jake Cuenca as Jake Retualo - He is the swoon-worthy son of Major Ret Retualo.
- Celine Lim as Butching
- Sophia Baars as Sofia
- Mikan Ong as Mikan
- Jairus Aquino as Jai
  - Rayver Cruz as Jai (10 years after)
- Carlo Balmaceda as Bronson
  - Ejay Falcon as Bronson (10 years after)

== Soundtrack ==
- Theme song was sung by Bayani Agbayani.

== See also ==
- Oki Doki Doc
- OK Fine, 'To ang Gusto Nyo!
- List of programs broadcast by ABS-CBN
