= Mars (talk show) =

Philippine television talk show

- Title card in 2019
- Also known as: Mars Pa More
- Genre: Talk show
- Written by: Stann Go; Haydee Bellen; Irish Mangubat; Dexter Mantes; Faith Monreal
- Directed by: Rommel Gacho
- Presented by: Camille Prats; Suzi Entrata; Iya Villania; Kim Atienza
- Country of origin: Philippines
- Original language: Tagalog

Production
- Production locations: Studio 1, GMA Network Center, Quezon City, Philippines
- Camera setup: Multiple-camera setup
- Running time: 20–27 minutes
- Production company: GMA Entertainment Group

Original release
- Network: GMA News TV (June 11, 2012 – May 31, 2019); GMA Network (July 8, 2019 – July 1, 2022)
- Release: June 11, 2012 – July 1, 2022

Mars Pa More, formerly Mars is a Philippine television talk show broadcast by GMA News TV and GMA Network. Originally hosted by Camille Prats and Suzi Entrata, it premiered on GMA News TV on June 11, 2012 on the network's evening line up as Mars. The show aired its final episode on GMA News TV on May 31, 2019. It moved to GMA Network on July 8, 2019 on the network's morning line up as Mars Pa More. The show concluded on July 1, 2022. Prats, Iya Villania and Kim Atienza served as the final hosts.

The show is streaming online on YouTube.

== Premise ==
Title card as Mars.

The shows introduces a roster of kids who have abilities to sing, dance and cook. The show also features discussions and activities such as home-cooked recipes, family-friendly games, crafts, musical segments, social media trend challenges, travel suggestions, tips for beauty and home living for mothers.

== Hosts ==
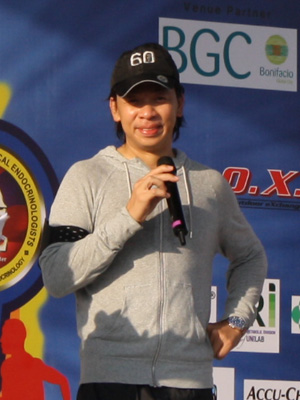
Kim Atienza served as a host.

- Camille Prats (2012–22)
- Suzi Entrata (2012–19)
- Iya Villania (2019–22)
- Kim Atienza (2021–22)

Guest host

- Chariz Solomon (2019)

== Production ==
In March 2020, the admission of a live audience in the studio and production were suspended due to the enhanced community quarantine in Luzon by the COVID-19 pandemic. The show resumed its programming on July 27, 2020.

== Accolades ==
Accolades received by Mars
| Year | Award | Category | Recipient | Result | Ref. |
|---|---|---|---|---|---|
| 2014 | Golden Screen TV Awards | Outstanding Celebrity Talk Program | Mars | Nominated | |
| 2014 | Golden Screen TV Awards | Outstanding Celebrity Talk Program Host | Camille Prats Suzi Entrata | Nominated | |
| 2016 | 30th PMPC Star Awards for Television | Best Celebrity Talk Show | Mars | Nominated | |
| 2016 | 30th PMPC Star Awards for Television | Best Celebrity Talk Show Hosts | Camille Prats Suzi Entrata | Nominated | |
| 2017 | 31st PMPC Star Awards for Television | Best Celebrity Talk Show | Mars | Nominated | |
| 2017 | 31st PMPC Star Awards for Television | Best Celebrity Talk Show Host | Camille Prats Suzi Entrata | Nominated | |
| 2018 | 32nd PMPC Star Awards for Television | Best Celebrity Talk Show | Mars | Nominated | |
| 2018 | 32nd PMPC Star Awards for Television | Best Celebrity Talk Show Host | Camille Prats Suzi Entrata | Nominated | |
| 2019 | Anak TV Seal Awards | | Mars | Won | |

Accolades received by Mars Pa More
| Year | Award | Category | Recipient | Result | Ref. |
|---|---|---|---|---|---|
| 2021 | 34th PMPC Star Awards for Television | Best Celebrity Talk Show | Mars Pa More | Nominated | |
| 2021 | 34th PMPC Star Awards for Television | Best Celebrity Talk Show Host | Camille Prats Iya Villania | Nominated | |
| 2023 | 35th PMPC Star Awards for Television | Best Celebrity Talk Show | Mars Pa More | Nominated | |
| 2023 | 35th PMPC Star Awards for Television | Best Celebrity Talk Show Host | Camille Prats Iya Villania | Nominated | |
