= Princess Sarah (TV series) =

2007 Philippine television series

- Title card
- Genre: Drama; Fantasy; Comedy
- Created by: ABS-CBN Studios
- Based on: A Little Princess by Frances Hodgson Burnett
- Developed by: ABS-CBN Studios; Roldeo T. Endrinal; Julie Anne R. Benitez
- Directed by: Don M. Cuaresma; Nuel C. Naval
- Starring: Sharlene San Pedro; Albert Martinez; Sheryl Cruz; Sophia Baars
- Opening theme: "Ngiti Ka Lang"
- Composer: Christian Martinez
- Country of origin: Philippines
- Original language: Filipino
- No. of episodes: 30

Production
- Executive producers: Eugenio G. Lopez III; Laurenti M. Dyogi; Roldeo T. Endrinal; Kylie Manalo-Balagtas; Carlina D. Dela Merced
- Production locations: Baguio, Philippines; Manila, Philippines
- Running time: 30-45 minutes
- Production company: Dreamscape Entertainment

Original release
- Network: ABS-CBN
- Release: November 12 – December 21, 2007

Princess Sarah is a 2007 Philippine television drama series broadcast by ABS-CBN. The series is loosely based on Frances Hodgson Burnett's novel A Little Princess and its Japanese anime adaption Princess Sara. Directed by Don M. Cuaresma and Nuel C. Naval, it stars Sharlene San Pedro. It aired on the network's Primetime Bida line up and worldwide on TFC from November 12 to December 21, 2007, replacing Kokey and was replaced by Spring Waltz.

The series was shot in Camp John Hay in Baguio and the Coconut Palace in Manila instead of India and London during the Late Victorian Era (including Second Boer War) and World War I. Unlike the 1995 Filipino film and the 1985 Japanese anime series it was based from, which in turn was based on Burnett's original novel, the teleserye adaptation took even more creative liberties from the original story, with Ram Dass being depicted as a female sorceress, Lavinia as Miss Minchin's daughter, and fantasy elements being introduced to the story.

This series was streaming on Jeepney TV YouTube channel.

== Plot ==
Sarah Crewe studies in a boarding school for rich girls. Although motherless, Sarah is rich in love showered by her father, Captain Christopher Crewe. One day her father has to leave for an expedition and is lost and presumed dead.

The sufferings of Sarah begin, as she was reduced to poverty and was forced to live a life as a servant in Miss Minchin's seminary.

== Cast and characters ==
=== Main characters ===
- Sharlene San Pedro as Sarah Crewe, a beautiful young girl who dreams of being a princess.
- Albert Martinez as Capt. Christopher Crewe - the father of Sarah. Envied by other pirates for his discovered treasure map, he is placed in a situation between life and death matters.
- Sheryl Cruz as Miss Maria Minchin - the owner and headmistress of the boarding school where Sarah stays. Miss Minchin has the strongest personality in the house, and she is blinded by the shine of richness. She was later revealed to be Lavinia's biological mother. In the end, she feels regret for her mistakes for Sarah until she was arrested by the police twice and sent back to jail.
- Ai-Ai delas Alas as Rama Dass (a female version of Ram Dass) - a native woman who often visits the city. She is of high ranking in her tribe and later came to Captain Crewe's side for help. Ram Dass is male in the original story.
- Candy Pangilinan as Miss Amelia Minchin - the kind-hearted sister of the cruel Miss Minchin. Her sister often bullies her, but at the end of the story, Amelia makes a stand against her dominating sister.
- Diether Ocampo as Master Brandon Crissford - a friend of Captain Crewe. Brandon lives next door to the boarding school where Sarah works as a maid.
- Sophia Baars as Lavinia Minchin Herbert - Sarah's rival in school. She does everything to make Sarah's life as miserable as possible. As the series progress, secrets about her family are revealed and her manners are justified. In the end, she reconciles with Sarah and Becky.
- Carlos Agassi as Phillip Burrows - deviant to the original story, the series' main villain role was shifted to Mr. Burrows - a play on Mr. Barrow from the original one. He keeps Captain Crewe captive for a long time for the latter to surrender a map the former failed to retrieve during their expedition. He blackmails the boarding school headmistress for the sake of money. On the other hand, Miss Minchin's character serves as a bit humorous and lighter form of a villain. He is killed by Captain Crewe.

=== Students ===
- Noemi Oineza as Lottie Leigh - the cry baby of the group.
- Khaycee Aboloc as Ermengarde St. John - Sarah's best friend.
- Divine Loraine Penaflor as Gertrude - one of Lavinia's friends who helps her with getting rid of Sarah's reputation.
- Bianca Pulmano as Jessie - another of Lavinia's friends who also helps her with getting rid of Sarah's reputation.
- Angel Sy as Eidelweiss - former student of the dormitory and now the school ghost. She befriended Sarah and Becky and is a great help to the two in times of distress, set aside when it comes to Miss Minchin.

=== Other characters ===
- Eunice Lagusad as Becky - one of the maids in the boarding school. Becky becomes friends with Sarah while she is still wealthy and continues to support her after she is relegated to the attic.
- Irish Fullerton as Miss Viola - the music teacher of the girls.
- Jaime Fabregas as Monsieur Dufarge - the French teacher. Fabregas previously played Mr. James, the chef, in Sarah, Ang Munting Prinsesa.
- Melissa Ricks as Mariette - one of the maids in the boarding school and the sister of Picolino. She falls in love with Paul, although she is not dismissed from her job like in the 1985 Japanese anime series.
- Matt Evans as Paul - Peter's eldest brother.
- Lui Villaruz as Piccolino - the resident chef of the boarding school, who is secretly in love with Amelia but he befriends Mariette, Sarah and Becky (unlike James from the 1985 Japanese anime series and 1995 live-action film).
- Bubbles Paraiso as Kalela - Brandon's partner.
- Julijo Pisk as Peter
- Helga Krapf as Antoinette - another maid in the boarding school. She openly seduces Paul in front of Mariette to gain attention and often diverts her frustrations at the young maids - Sarah and Becky as well as the bullied students Lottie and Ermengarde (similar to Mollie from the 1985 Japanese anime series and 1995 live-action film).
- France Bonnin as Matilda
- Lou Veloso as Captain Seaweed
- Lauren Novero as Orion
- Andrew Muhlach as Graham
- Precious Lara Quigaman - a cameo role as Sarah's mother where she was seen briefly in a lullaby scene and in Sarah's locket.
- Lassy Marquez

=== Animal characters ===
- Surya - a little monkey that belongs to Rama Dass and is very playful. Surya is the name of monkey in the anime version and also in the Philippine movie version.
- Jump - Sarah's own horse, given to her by her father. He is of good nature and lived a happy life with Peter attending to him, until he had to leave one day.
- Mr. Chester - a cat that was brought by Peter to the school.
- Pedro - an iguana that was brought by Sarah to the street.
- Carl - a snake that was brought by Peter to the mall.
- Izzy - a polar bear that lives in Pasig City.
- Nebo - an owl that lives in Malabon Zoo. He also appeared on Kulilits.
- John - a lion that lives in Malabon Zoo. He also appeared in a commercial for Lucky Me Noodles.
- Romeo - a tiger that belongs to Peter and is very ugly. Romeo's voice actor is Nash Aguas.
- Reno - a turtle that lives in Palawan.
- Julalay - an elephant that lives in Africa. Julalay's voice actor is Basty Alcances.
- Chris - a zebra that lives in Africa. Chris' voice actor is JJ Zamora.

== Promotion ==
This show has been developed following the success of Mga Anghel na Walang Langit as part of a lineup of Dreamscape Entertainment family and religious-oriented series since 2005. It was succeeded by May Bukas Pa in 2009.

== Reception ==
Princess Sarah replaced Kokey in its timeslot and was expected to follow its success. The pilot episode garnered a 27.1% ratings according to AGB Nielsen in Mega Manila. It ran for only a month during the Christmas season; the finale ratings were low, only able to reach a total of 22% ratings. The highest rating was 28.5% while the lowest was 20.6%.

== See also ==
- Sarah... Ang Munting Prinsesa
- List of programs broadcast by ABS-CBN
- List of ABS-CBN Studios original drama series
