= Sarah... Ang Munting Prinsesa =

- Theatrical release poster
- Directed by: Romy V. Suzara
- Written by: Shaira Mella Salvador
- Based on: A Little Princess by Frances Hodgson Burnett
- Produced by: Charo Santos-Concio; Lily Y. Monteverde; Malou N. Santos
- Starring: Camille Prats
- Cinematography: Ely Cruz
- Edited by: Edgardo Vinarao
- Music by: Nonong Buencamino
- Production company: Star Cinema
- Release date: June 7, 1995
- Running time: 127 minutes
- Country: Philippines
- Languages: Filipino; Spanish; Hindi

Sarah... Ang Munting Prinsesa (English: Sarah... The Little Princess) is a 1995 Filipino family drama film directed by Romy V. Suzara. The screenplay, written by Shaira Mella Salvador, was based on the 1985 Japanese anime Princess Sara, which in turn was based on the 1905 children's novel A Little Princess by British-American playwright and author Frances Hodgson Burnett. The film stars Camille Prats in the title role, with the cast including Rio Locsin, Mat Ranillo III, Angelica Panganiban, Romeo Rivera, and Jean Garcia.

Produced and distributed by Star Cinema, the film was theatrically released on June 7, 1995. This is the fourth film adaptation that was based on the programs transmitted by ABS-CBN (both network-produced and foreign).

== Plot ==
Sarah Crewe, a beautiful little girl who was born in India, is sent to a boarding school in England, leaving her life in India and her father, Captain Crewe. Life is rather hard for Sarah, so he bought her a doll named Emily.

Sarah quickly became the center of attention at school and befriended almost all students, even the school's scullery maid, Becky. The rich yet selfish Lavinia Herbert, once the most popular girl in school, grows jealous of Sarah.

Sarah is then informed during her birthday party that her father died in a mining accident. Out of greed, Miss Minchin locked Sarah away in the attic, taking her possessions and forcing her into servitude to make her earn her keep, telling people outside that the girl had disappeared. Upon the downfall of her perceived rival, a gloating Lavinia and her coterie of girls then torment Sarah and Becky.

In the end, her father's friend discovers that Sarah, the person they have been searching for a long time, lives just next door, and eventually adopts the girl to repay her father for saving him. Miss Minchin and Lavinia feel remorseful about their cruel actions and ask Sarah for forgiveness for all the cruelties they inflicted on her.

== Cast ==
=== Main cast ===
- Camille Prats as Sarah Crewe

=== Supporting cast ===
- Jean Garcia as Miss Minchin
- Rio Locsin as Miss Amelia
- Mat Ranillo III as Captain Ralph Crewe
- Angelica Panganiban as Becky
- Angelica Pedersen as Lavinia Herbert
- Paula Peralejo as Gertrude
- Romeo Rivera as Mr. Anthony Crisford (Note: Mr. Crisford was based on the original character, Mr. Carrisford.)
- Jaime Fábregas as James, the school cook
- Romy Romulo as Ram Dass, Mr. Crisford's Indian servant
- Tony Carreón as Señor Francisco, (Note: Señor Francisco was based on the original character, Monsieur Dufarge, who teaches French.) the Spanish language teacher
- Ramón Recto as Mr. Barrow
- Malou Crisólogo as Miss Mollie
- Kathleen Go Quien as Ermengarde St. John
- Ani Pearl Alonzo as Lottie Leigh
- Sara Polverini as Jessie
- Ryan de Vela as Peter
- Alex Symington as Peter's father
- Hilda Levantolia as Nuni Muni
- Fritz Franz Pinar as Elma Rebato
- Sarah Asher Geronimo as Sarah's classmate

== Production ==
After he finished Lagalag: The Eddie Fernandez Story and some television films, director Romy V. Suzara became inactive in directing for months before he was assigned to be the director of Sarah... Ang Munting Prinsesa. Most of the film was shot on location in Scotland, with other scenes shot on set in Baguio, Philippines. A departure from the original novel and the anime is that the girls studied Spanish as a foreign language instead of French.

Hundreds auditioned for the title role in the film. It was ultimately offered to Camille Prats, despite not auditioning for the role, because she bears a striking resemblance to the anime character, particularly with her hair and eyes. In 2022, Angelica Panganiban revealed that she was not initially cast for a specific role in the film. She was only picked on the spot as Becky by an assistant director during the filming.

== Reception ==
=== Accolades ===
Accolades received by Sarah... Ang Munting Prinsesa
Year	Award	Category	Recipient(s)	Result	Ref.
1996	Guillermo Mendoza Memorial Scholarship Foundation	Best Child Actress	Camille Prats	Won	
1996	FAMAS Awards	Best Child Actress	Camille Prats	Nominated	
1996	FAMAS Awards	Best Child Actress	Angelica Panganiban	Nominated	
1996	FAMAS Awards	Best Production Design	Manny Morfe	Nominated	
1996	PMPC Star Awards for Movies	Best Child Actress	Camille Prats	Nominated	
1996	PMPC Star Awards for Movies	Best Child Actress	Angelica Panganiban	Won	
1996	PMPC Star Awards for Movies	Best Screen Adaptation	Shaira Mella-Salvador	Won	

== See also ==
- A Little Princess - 1995 American film also based on the novel.
- Princess Sarah - live action TV adaptation of the film.
