= Oki Doki Doc =

1996 Filipino TV Show and Film

- Title card (only used at year 1993 until 1994)
- Genre: Sitcom
- Written by: Ipe Pelino; Divino Reyes; Rhandy Reyes; Woodrow Serafin
- Directed by: Johnny Manahan (1993–1994); Danni Caparas (1994–2000)
- Starring: Aga Muhlach
- Theme music composer: Homer Flores
- Opening theme: "Oki Doki Doc" by Oki Doki Doc barkada
- Ending theme: bit parts of "Oki Doki Doc" by Oki Doki Doc barkada
- Country of origin: Philippines
- Original language: Tagalog
- No. of episodes: 365

Production
- Executive producers: Linggit Tan; Loida Virina; Cynthia De Jesus
- Running time: 1 hour
- Production company: ABS-CBN Studios

Original release
- Network: ABS-CBN
- Release: October 9, 1993 – December 2, 2000

Related
- That's My Doc

Oki Doki Doc (also known as Oki Doki Dok) was a Philippine sitcom was broadcast by ABS-CBN. It aired on the network's Saturday afternoon line up from October 9, 1993 to December 2, 2000, replacing Mana-Mana and was replaced by Arriba, Arriba!.

This series is currently rerun on Jeepney TV Every Saturday at 5:15 p.m.

== Synopsis ==
This sitcom revolves around the adventures and misadventures in the life of Dr. Aga, a young veterinarian who has inherited his brother's children. Dr. Aga has just opened his animal clinic in a middle-class subdivision and plans on a successful career. He lives with his best friend and "kinakapatid" Godo in the duplex that is in a compound owned by Don Berto Makunatan a.k.a. Babsy. His duplex unit doubles up as his vet office while the other unit is used by Babsy and his three children, Paolo, Alex (Agot Isidro) and Toni (Claudine Barretto).

Aga was leading a normal single life and was quite enjoying his bachelorhood when his brother-in-law lost his job. Because of this unfortunate situation, his brother-in-law is forced to take on a job abroad which required him to bring his wife. Being the only relative who has a respectable status, Aga is stuck with the responsibility of caring for his sister's two children, Camille (Camille Prats) and Fonzie (Alfonso Martinez). This cuts short his life as a bachelor and catapults him into the status of a father and mother.

Few years later, Aga and his friends were forced to leave their former home due to the demolition and make way for the construction of a flyover. However, when they transferred to their new territory it was near the street market. In their new community, they are joined by their new neighbors, friends and acquaintances including Alfredo (Ching Arellano) and Dyords (Carmina Villarroel).

== Cast ==
=== Main cast ===
- Aga Muhlach as Dr. Agaton "Doc Aga" Villaluz - He is the typical "guy next door" kind of fellow. Women fall for him easily because of his boyish looks. He is what viewers perceive as truly "Pinoy." He is very practical in his approach to life and fervently hopes of finding the girl of his dreams and finally settling down. He is very well organized and clean. He loves having fun and once in a while plays jokes on friends. He has a well-balanced sense of humor and enjoys displaying this. Aga is very reliable and believes that a man's word is sacred. Aside from being a veterinarian, he loves to dance and engage in sports. He adores his "pamangkins" and takes very good care of them. He simply loves animals and this is why he's able to put up with his "kinakapatid", Godo.
- Babalu† (1993–1998) as Don Robert "Papsy/Mang Berto/Babsy" Makunatan - He is a millionaire don, rich but kuripot, since the death of his wife, Mamsy. He is a balut magnate, so to speak, but is a very shrewd and cunning businessman. In spite of his stinginess in business, he usually softens up once his daughters, Toni and Alex, makes endearments to him. He also has a son, Paolo, whom he expects to follow and take over his balut business. Popsy has an inherent hatred over Godo and dislikes Aga for his daughter Alex.
- Agot Isidro as Alexandra "Alex" Makunatan - She is the best girlfriend that Aga has. She is a flight attendant. She perceives herself as one of the boys but, as far as Aga is concerned, he has a secret crush on her, which eventually leads to a more serious relationship. She loves to travel and talk about her travels. She dreams of becoming a top executive in the airline company.

=== Supporting cast ===
- Claudine Barretto (1993-1998) as Antonia "Toni" Makunatan - She is our typical teenager of the 1990s. She is going through the most difficult stage of her life — puberty. She likes other boys and leads a normal life. She can sometimes be scheming, especially when there's something she really wants. She has a bright outlook at life and this can be seen in her aggressiveness. Her role model when it comes to womanhood is her sister, Alex.
- Jimmy Santos as Godo - He is the complete opposite of Aga. He is a slob, a hustler, and a wanton. He was once Aga's classmate in Vet Med but Aga continued on to become a full-fledged Vet, while Godo stayed on in his first year. a professional student by practice, his parents believed that he is now in his last few semester of Medicine Proper. Always out for an extra buck, he constantly invites conflict and trouble into their lives. He acts as Aga's assistant in the clinic and does most of the clean-up jobs. He pictures himself as God's gift to women, but seems to attract the homely types. He is in constant conflict with the land owner Babsy.
- Camille Prats as Camille — She is our typical "siga" little girl who is fond of doing boyish stuff and games. She loves kicking Godo in the shin and this makes him jump up and down She has tomboyish tendencies which Aga and Alex discourage. the thing with her is that only Godo catches her when she causes trouble but she takes on the persona of an angel when Aga or Alex arrive, therefore putting the blame on Godo.
- Rica Peralejo as Rica - She is Aga's cousin.
- Alfonso Martinez (1993-1995) as Fonzie
- Paolo Contis as Paolo Makunatan - He is the youngest son of Babsy. He is a regular "pilyo" and enjoys playing pranks on people. When he grows up, he intends to follow his father's footsteps by being a successful balut magnate. He idolizes his father to the point that he emulates his weird sense of fashion. he seems a lot smarter than Godo and makes Godo do all sorts of things for him. He also idolizes Aga.
- Katya Santos (1993-1995) as Katya - She is Doc Aga's niece.
- Antoinette Taus (1994-1995) as Antoinette - She is Fonzie's elder sister.
- Joy Viado† (1994-1995) as Joy - She is a fishball vendor who later worked as a helper for the Makunatan Household. She is also Godo's lover.
- Carmina Villarroel (1995-1998) as Dyords/George - She is one of the newest addition to the "family". George is the bigger version of Camille. She is the street-smart vendor who sells second hand clothes on the market. Being left alone by her parents to fend for herself, she has grown tougher and more independent. She looks at life one day at a time and is very practical about treating and looking at life's situations. George lives in the attic room where Aga and Godo lives. This set-up doesn't bother her since she considers Aga and Godo her brothers.
- Ching Arellano† (1995-1998) as SPO2 Alfredo Rin or "SPO" as people fondly call him - He is the guardian of the market. He sees to it that there is order in the community and he tries his very best to serve his constituents, and his very own small way. SPO is a dedicated police man. He does not engage in shadowy deals and never accepted a single bribe in his whole life. Because of his good-naturedness and being very accommodating, there are times when people take advantage of this. This leads him into very uncompromising situations, but, with the help of Aga and company, everything turns out for the best.
- Pia Serrano (1995) as Bettina
- Leah Scarnet Genlen (1995-2000) as Leklek
- Farrah Florer (1996-1998) as Krina
- Serena Dalrymple (1997) as Pie
- Roderick Paulate (1998-2000) as Dickson - He is the closeted butcher whose shop is across Doc Aga's clinic. Like George before him, Dickson lives in the attic room where Aga and Godo live. He has a crush on Doc Aga, who seems not to care or is oblivious to the fact. Dickson replaced Dyords/George after her departure.
- Don Pepot† (1998–2000) as Lolo Kap - He is Mang Berto's uncle who possess the same qualities as his late nephew. He replaced the character of Babalu after his death in 1998.
- Charlene Gonzales (1999–2000) as Marita - She is the granddaughter of Lolo Kap and Alex's cousin. She is also the female and 'bigger' version of Paolo (similar to who George is to Camille), who is also her nephew. She replaces Toni.
- Redford White (1999) as Bernie
- Lorena Garcia (1999-2000) as Guday
- Boboy Garrovillo (2000) as Joaquin "Jake" Makunatan - He is Babsy's long lost first son who was thought to have died but was revealed to be alive. He later reunite with his other siblings.
- Gina Pareño (2000) as Lola Baby - She is the mother of Cristine, the woman who Doc Aga had an affair with.
- Julio Pacheco (2000) as Jiggy Villaluz - He is Doc Aga's son from his affair to a woman named Cristine. Jiggy was raised alone by Cristine and Lola Baby. But when Cristine died, Lola Baby revealed the truth and introduced him to his father, Doc Aga which caused Alex to break up with him.
- Benjie Paras as Juancho
- Piolo Pascual as Pilo
- Melisa Henderson (2000)

=== Claudine Barretto's departure ===
Claudine Barretto left Oki Doki Doc during the later years due to her busy schedules in soap operas and films. She was too exhausted with the tight schedule of taping hours when she decided to leave. In 1999, she became a recurring guest star. But due to her soap opera commitments she later on decided to leave the show totally. She was then replaced by Charlene Gonzales.

== Film ==
Oki Doki Doc: The Movie
- Directed by: Efren 'Loging' Jarlego
- Screenplay by: Loida Viriña
- Produced by: Charo Santos-Concio; Malou N. Santos
- Starring: Aga Muhlach; Agot Isidro; Claudine Barreto; Carmina Villarroel; Babalu; Jimmy Santos; Camille Prats; Paolo Contis; Ricky Davao; Niño Muhlach
- Cinematography: Oscar Querijero
- Edited by: Edgardo 'Totoy' Jarlego
- Music by: Ramon del Rosario
- Production company: Star Cinema
- Release date: January 10, 1996
- Country: Philippines
- Language: Filipino

== Reboot ==
In 2007, rebooted of Oki Doki Doc titled That's My Doc premiered on ABS-CBN.
