= Camille Prats =

Filipino actress (born 1985)

Camille Prats-Yambao
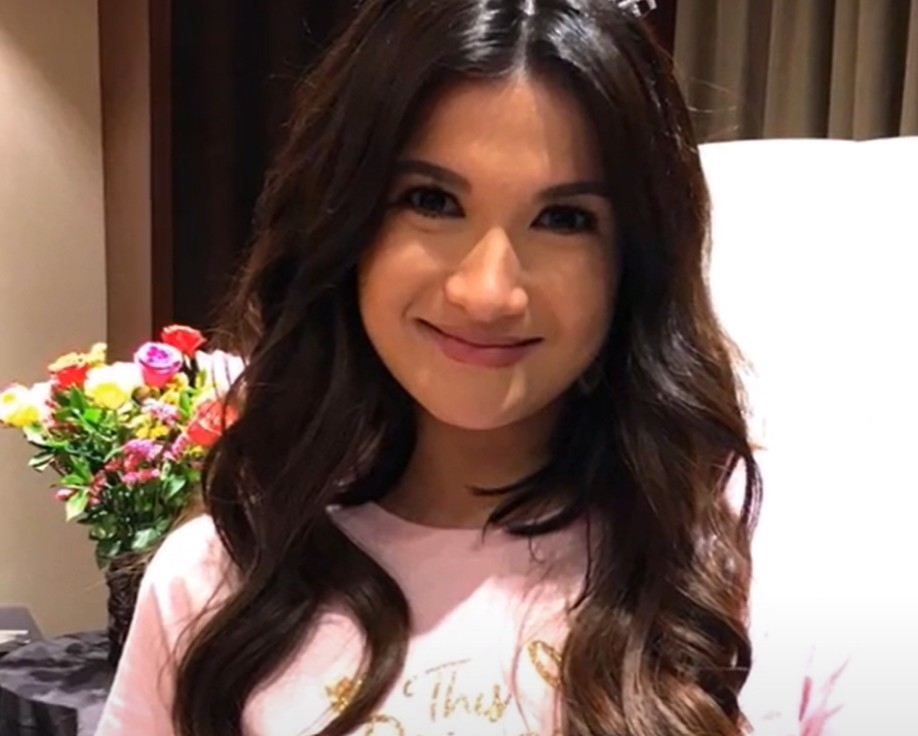
- Prats in 2016
- Born: Sheena Patricia Camille Quiambao Prats; June 20, 1985 (age 41); Manila, Philippines
- Other names: Princess Sarah, Cams
- Occupations: Actress; TV host; endorser; public speaker; businesswoman; director; president / school directress
- Years active: 1990–present
- Agents: Star Magic (1992–2004); ALV Talent Circuit (2004–2018); Sparkle GMA Artist Center (2005–present)
- Height: 1.58 m (5 ft 2 in)
- Spouses: Anthony Linsangan (m. 2008; died 2011); John Yambao (m. 2017)
- Children: 3
- Relatives: John Prats (brother); Isabel Oli (sister-in-law)

Sheena Patricia Camille Quiambao Prats-Yambao (Tagalog pronunciation: [kaˈmil pɾats]; born June 20, 1985), popularly known as Camille Prats, is a Filipino actress, TV host, public speaker, and businesswoman, who gained prominence for her title role in the 1995 film Sarah... Ang Munting Prinsesa (Philippine adaptation of A Little Princess).

== Career ==
Prats debuted in 1990 as a grand finalist in Little Miss Philippines, a segment of the variety show Eat Bulaga!. She later became a regular on the ABS-CBN children's program Ang TV. In 1993, she joined the cast of Oki Doki Doc, starring Aga Muhlach.

In 1995, Prats starred as Princess Sarah in the film Sarah... Ang Munting Prinsesa, a Philippine adaptation of the anime, A Little Princess.

At age 12, Prats was the youngest performer at the second anniversary concert for ASAP at the Araneta Coliseum. In 1999, Prats starred as the main lead in the youth-oriented show G-mik alongside Stefano Mori, Miko Samson, and Danilo Barrios. Her brother, John Prats, was also part of the cast. That same year, she appeared on the afternoon drama Marinella with Shaina Magdayao and Serena Dalrymple. During the early 2000s, Prats appeared on several ABS-CBN sitcoms, including Arriba, Arriba! (2000–2003) and Home Along Da Airport (2003–2005). She played her first villain role in the action-drama series Basta't Kasama Kita, starring Judy Ann Santos and Robin Padilla.

Prats left ABS-CBN in 2005 and transferred to GMA Network. She starred in her first series for the network, Kung Mamahalin Mo Lang Ako. The following year, she starred opposite Richard Gutierrez in Captain Barbell. In 2009, Prats appeared in the Star Cinema horror film T2. Although invited to appear on Kapamilya Deal or No Deal on ABS-CBN, Prats confirmed she would remain a GMA contract artist.

From 2012 to 2022, Prats hosted the talk show MARS. After the show ended, she renewed her contract with GMA Network and returned to television with the series AraBella in 2023.

In 2025, Prats played a dual role in the series Mommy Dearest. She portrayed Jade and her twin sister Olive, a character with Munchausen syndrome by proxy. She promoted the series on the variety show It's Showtime, marking her return to the ABS-CBN frequencies after 21 years.

== Public image and impact ==
"I'm so grateful that people still remember my character, Princess Sarah, even up to now. Before, I used to question it because my struggle growing up was to break free from that role. For a very long time, people saw me as Princess Sarah. [...] I made a lot of efforts to mature and did so many things to move away from being Princess Sarah. [...] I truly see it as a blessing because that was the turning point of my career. [...] I think Sarah will always have a special place in the hearts of those who grew up in the '90s."

— Part of Prats's address at the GMA Network Center to launch the Mommy Dearest drama series, 2025

Prats is known for her wholesome image and has often been cited as a role model due to her iconic role as Princess Sarah in the box-office hit movie Sarah... Ang Munting Prinsesa. Her portrayal as the kind-hearted Princess Sarah cemented her child superstar status and made the character synonymous with her.

Prats' success and the popularity of Sarah... Ang Munting Prinsesa have influenced the development of other child actors and Filipino cinema.

In 2015, Prats received a star on the Eastwood City Walk of Fame.

== Personal life ==
Camille Prats was born on June 20, 1985, in Manila and the second child of Daniel Rafael and Alma (née Quiambao) Prats, the latter of whom is from Macabebe, Pampanga. She is also the niece of former actress Mia Prats and Nadia Montenegro. She has a sister and three brothers, one of whom is a director and former actor, John Prats.

Prats attended OB Montessori for grade school and ABS-CBN Distance Learning Center for high school. She studied Marketing at Thames International Business School. In 2007, Prats went to the United States to finish her studies. Prats studied Early Childhood Education and Montessori teaching in Los Angeles, California.

Prats confirmed her civil marriage with childhood friend Anthony C. Linsangan on January 5, 2008, in Los Angeles, California at The Albertson Wedding Chapel. On January 24, 2008, Prats gave birth to her first child. On March 5, 2010, Prats and Linsangan married again in a church wedding at the Sanctuario de San Antonio in Forbes Park, Makati.

On September 23, 2011, Linsangan, died of nasopharyngeal carcinoma at the age of 31.

On January 7, 2017, Prats married her grade school classmate, Filipino-American businessman John "VJ" Yambao at the Prats-owned Nayomi Sanctuary Resort in Batangas. They have two children together and are co-parenting Yambao's son from a previous relationship.

Prats became a born-again Christian in 2013. Prats is a public speaker who travels all over the Philippines, Taiwan, and Japan to share a message about her faith in God.

== Other ventures ==
=== Endorsements ===
Prats is one of the country's leading celebrity endorsers.

PLDT Home, Unilab FortiD, CDO Holiday, Nestlé Puritan's Pride, Jollibee, Condura, Shinagawa, Baygon, Secosana, Physiogel, Beautederm, Universal Health Care, Lactum, KoolFever, RiteMed for Kids, Colgate, Sanosan, Joie, Plemex, Energen, Cheez Whiz, Jolly Claro Cooking Oil, Red Ribbon Bakeshop, Purefoods, Knorr, Goldilocks, Jetour AutoPH and Panasonic were some of the products that Prats collaborated with. Prats is the first celebrity endorser of the skin care brand, DermAid.

Prats was a longtime image model and media spokesperson for Banco Filipino's Happy Savers Club. In 2002, Prats was inducted as the first National President of the Happy Savers Club with more than 90,000 members.

=== Business ===
Prats is one of the board of directors of the DS Prats Group of Companies, a Prats-family owned company, that offers construction, property development, media and advertising, large format prints, events management, production house, lights and sounds, hotel and resort, and school institution services.

In 2008, Prats opened her own school, Divine Angels Montessori of Cainta, Inc. (DAMCI) which is now Roots Academy Philippines. Prats serves as the president and school directress. Star Magic artist Belle Mariano is a notable alumna.

Prats owns the Japanese restaurant Asakusa Home of Tempura and Tito's Fil-Mex.

Prats co-owns an activewear brand, Moov Activ.

=== Advocacy ===
Prats is known for her advocacy on body positivity and environmental awareness. Additionally, Prats partnered with World Vision to promote their A Pursuit of Joy campaign, which focuses on child-focused humanitarian efforts.

In 2020, Prats has been involved in advocacy related to food waste and repurposing with WWF-Philippines through her participation in the Kawali-Kasan series, which aims to promote sustainable home-cooking and raise funds for the organization's partner communities. Prats along with other celebrity moms launched Project: Alalay Kay Nanay a fundraising project. It aims to help mothers of kids ages two and younger, whose livelihood has been gravely affected by the enhanced community quarantine (ECQ), and to also support children with special needs.

Prats is a Kythe Foundation advocate and celebrity sponsor. In 2023, Prats generously sponsored a Christmas party for pediatric patients of the National Children's Hospital.

In 2025, Prats participated in a fun run for the benefit of Save the Children Philippines.

== Filmography ==
=== Television series ===
Year	Title	Role
1992–1997	Ang TV	Herself
1993–2000	Oki Doki Doc	Camille
1996–1999	Kaybol: Ang Bagong TV	Herself
1999–2001	Marinella	Marie de Guzman / Marie Reynoso
1999–2002	G-mik	Ronalisa "Roni" Salcedo
2000–2003	Arriba, Arriba!	Biba Arriba
2001	Sa Dulo ng Walang Hanggan	Terry
2002–2003	Bituin	Lovelyn Gaston
2003	Tabing Ilog	Natasha
2003–2004	Basta't Kasama Kita	Diamante / Susan Catindig
2003–2005	Home Along Da Airport	Sam
2005–2006	Ganda ng Lola Ko	Dedeth
2005–2006	Kung Mamahalin Mo Lang Ako	Joyce Cardenal
2006–2007	Captain Barbell	Marikit "Kit" Salvacion
2007	Super Twins	Drew Barimor
2008	Sine Novela: Gaano Kadalas Ang Minsan?	Lily Medrano / Lily Cervantes
2009	Totoy Bato	Anna (young adult)
2010	Ikaw Sana	Giselle
2010	Pilyang Kerubin	Rosa
2010–2011	Bantatay	Daisy Razon
2011–2012	Munting Heredera	Sandra Santiago-Montereal / Susan Velasco
2012	Luna Blanca	Young Rowena Sandoval
2013	Bukod Kang Pinagpala	Bessilda "Bessie" Villerte-Alcuar
2014	The Borrowed Wife	Sophia Gonzales-Villaraza / Maria Carlotta "Maricar" Perez-Santos
2015	Second Chances	Rebecca "Reb / Becky" Villacorta
2016	Wish I May	Olivia "Ms. O" Pizarro-Gomez
2018	Ang Forever Ko'y Ikaw	Maria Virginia "Ginny Dyosabel" Peche-Capurian / Dimaigue
2020–2022	Makulay ang Buhay	Mom C
2021	Heartful Café	Bettina
2023	AraBella	Roselle Abad-Abarro (formerly Montecillo)
2024	Lilet Matias: Attorney-at-Law	Monica Umni
2025	Mommy Dearest	Dra. Olivia "Olive" Caparas / Jade
TBA	A Million Dreams	

=== Drama anthology ===
Year	Title	Role
1994–2006	Maalaala Mo Kaya: Chimes	Maan
1994–2006	Maalaala Mo Kaya: Kropeck	Patricia
1994–2006	Maalaala Mo Kaya: Paputok	Doray
1994–2006	Maalaala Mo Kaya: Liwanag	Young Caroline
1994–2006	Maalaala Mo Kaya: Desaparecidos	Young Militte
1994–2006	Maalaala Mo Kaya: Lollipop	
1994–2006	Maalaala Mo Kaya: Dyobus at Polbo	
1994–2006	Maalaala Mo Kaya: Ribbon	Katrina
1994–2006	Maalaala Mo Kaya: Cupcake	Louella
1994–2006	Maalaala Mo Kaya: Bato	Diana
1994–2006	Maalaala Mo Kaya: Kuwintas	Perla
1994–2006	Maalaala Mo Kaya: Medalyang Ginto	Sheila
1996-1998	Flames: Bisikleta	Mariel
1996-1998	Flames: I Hate Boys, I Hate Girls	Bibay
1996-1998	Flames: Dance With Me	Kim
1996-1998	Flames: The More You Hate	
1997	Star Drama Theater: Camille Manika ni Lorelie	Lorelie
1997	Star Drama Theater: Camille Takot	Juliet
1997	Star Drama Theater: Camille Ang Daya Mo	Peachy
1997	Star Drama Theater: Camille Umaga sa Langit	Michelle
1997–2005
1997–2005	Wansapanataym: Ang Hiwaga Ng Gintong Piseta	Joselle
1997–2005	Wansapanataym: Mighty Liling	Diday
1997–2005	Wansapanataym: Konsensya	Goma
1997–2005	Wansapanataym: Peyritels (First Anniversary Special)	Momay
1997–2005	Wansapanataym: Shoe-mayaw, Shoe-munod	Jessa
1997–2005	Wansapanataym: Kerubin Liit	
1997–2005	Wansapanataym: Mannequin-dat	Leila
1997–2005	Wansapanataym: Singsing Ni Ningning	Ningning
1997–2005	Wansapanataym: Mahiwagang Likido	Lizette
1997–2005	Wansapanataym: Lyko, Angel Ko	Cita
1997–2005	Wansapanataym: Kambing Alone	Karen
1997–2005	Wansapanataym: Ok Ka Fairy Tay	Anette
1997–2005	Wansapanataym: Washing Time Machine	Olivia
1997–2005	Wansapanataym: Dragonesa	Pamela
1997–2005	Wansapanataym: Clone-yari Lang	Kit
2005	Nginiiig!	
2005	Wag Kukurap: Ang Bata sa Itaas	Cecile
2006	Komiks: Bampy (Star Magic 14th Anniversary Special)	Vampire
2006–2016	Magpakailanman: Pag-iibigang Nakaukit Sa Langit: The Romnick Sarmenta and Harlene Bautista Love Story (Valentine's Day Special)	Harlene
2006–2016	Magpakailanman: Child for Sale: The Buboy Liit Story	Winnie
2006–2016	Magpakailanman: The Prolen Bonacua Story	Jane
2006–2016	Magpakailanman: Paano Na Ang Ating Anak: The Mark Anthony and Susan Bautista Story	Susan
2006–2016	Magpakailanman: Tiyahin ko, Karibal ko	Nina
2012	Spooky Nights: Premonisyon	Grace
2013	One Day Isang Araw	Arlene
2015–2016	Wagas: Matet & Mickey Love Story	Matet
2015–2016	Wagas: Ghost Stalker	Weng
2016	Dear Uge: Machong Make-up Artist	Melissa
2018	Tadhana: Tukso	Irma
2018	Daig Kayo ng Lola Ko: Alamat ng Pinya	Cora

=== Television shows ===
Year	Title	Role
1990	Eat Bulaga	Herself / Little Miss Philippines
1995–2005	ASAP	Herself
2000–2003	Magandang Tanghali Bayan	Herself / Co-host
2005–2006	SOP Gigsters	Herself / Co-host
2006	Pinoy Big Brother: Celebrity Edition 1	Herself
2009	Kapamilya Deal or No Deal	Herself / Guest Player
2012–2022	Mars / Mars Pa More	Herself / Host
2013	Party Pilipinas	Herself / Guest Performer
2013–2015	The Ryzza Mae Show	Herself / Guest
2013–2018	Celebrity Bluff	Herself / Guest Player
2014	Sunday All Stars	Herself / Guest
2016	Dream Home	Herself
2016	Laff Camera Action	Herself
2016–2018	Lip Sync Battle Philippines	Herself / Contestant
2017	Full House Tonight	Herself / Guest
2017	Sunday PinaSaya	Herself / Guest
2018	The Lolas' Beautiful Show	Herself / Guest
2018–2024	Sarap, 'Di Ba?	Herself / Guest
2019	Studio 7	Herself / Guest
2020–2025	All-Out Sundays	Herself / Guest
2022–2025	TiktoClock	Herself / Guest / Co-host
2023–2025	Family Feud	Herself / Guest Player
2023–2025	Fast Talk with Boy Abunda	Herself / Guest
2025	It's Showtime	Herself / Guest

=== Television special ===
Year	Title	Role
2003	Camille, Princess at 18	Herself

=== Concerts ===
Year	Title	Venue
1993	Ang TV Concert Part I	Greenhills Theater
1994	Merikrismas, Meriklamo	Meralco Theater
1994	Pasko Na, Ang TV Pa	Folk Arts Theater
1994	Ang TV Concert Part II	Ateneo Gym
1995	Mula sa Puso Ang TV Concert	Folk Arts Theater
1995	Aga Muhlach Birthday Live	Delta Theater
1995	Oki Doki Doc Christmas Concert	Delta Theater
1996	Oki Doki Doc Christmas Concert	Delta Theater
1997	ASAP 2nd Anniversary Show	Araneta Coliseum
1998	Krismakipaps	Folk Arts Theater
2000	G-mik! Nation Concert Tour	All over the Philippines
2004	TFC	California, USA

=== Film ===
Year	Title	Role
1994	Muntik Na Kitang Minahal	
1994	Eat All You Can	Cheska
1994	Hindi Pa Tapos Ang Labada Darling	Camille
1995	Eskapo	Roberta Lopez
1995	Sarah... Ang Munting Prinsesa	Princess Sarah
1996	Oki Doki Doc: The Movie	Camille
1996	Madrasta	Liza
1996	Ang TV Movie: The Adarna Adventure	Carla
1997	Shake, Rattle & Roll VI: Ang Telebisyon	Jennifer
1997	Pakners	Jessa
1997	Ang Pulubi at ang Prinsesa	Rosalie
1997	Wanted Perfect Murder	Lukay
1998	Haba-baba-doo! Puti-puti-poo!	Camille
1998	Hiling	Anna
2001	Yamashita: The Tiger's Treasure	Xyra
2002	Jologs	Cameo
2005	Dreamboy	Adjeng
2006	Mga Batang Bangketa	Clarissa
2009	T2	Tess
2011	Six Degrees of Separation from Lilia Cuntapay	Herself
2014	Third Eye	Susan

== Awards and nominations ==
=== Film ===
Year	Organization	Award	Movie	Remarks
1996	Guillermo Mendoza Memorial Scholarship Foundation	Best Child Actress	Sarah... Ang Munting Prinsesa (1995)	Won
1996	PMPC Star Awards for Movies	Best Child Actress	Sarah... Ang Munting Prinsesa (1995)	Nominated
1996	FAMAS Awards	Best Child Actress	Sarah... Ang Munting Prinsesa (1995)	Nominated
1997	Box Office Entertainment Awards	Most Popular Child Actress	Madrasta (1996)	Won
1997	9th Annual National Consumers Awards	Movie Child Performer of the Year	Madrasta (1996)	Won
1997	FAMAS Awards	Best Child Actress	Madrasta (1996)	Nominated
1998	PMPC Star Awards for Movies	Movies Popular Child Actress	Wanted Perfect Murder (1997)	Nominated
2019	Sine Sandaan: Celebrating the Luminaries of Philippine Cinema	Teen Star Ng Sentenaryo	Various Projects	Won

=== Television ===
Year	Organization	Award	TV show	Remarks
1996	PMPC Star Awards for Television	Most Popular Child Actress	"Ang TV" (1995)	Nominated
1997	PMPC Star Awards for Television	Most Popular Child Actress	"Oki Doki Doc" (1996)	Nominated
2006	Golden Screen Awards	Outstanding Lead Actress	"MMK: Bato" (2005)	Nominated
2006	Golden Screen Awards	Outstanding Supporting Actress	"MMK: Kuwintas" (2005)	Won
2010	Lingkod TV Awards		"Bantatay" (2010)	Won
2011	8th ENPRESS Golden Screen TV Awards		"Munting Heredera" (2011)	Nominated
2012	26th PMPC Star Awards for Television		"Munting Heredera" (2012)	Nominated
2013	10th ENPRESS Golden Screen TV Awards		"Munting Heredera" (2013)	Nominated
2014	Golden Screen Awards	Outstanding Celebrity Talk Program Host	"MARS" (2013)	Nominated
2015	Gawad Tanglaw Awards		"MARS" (2014)	Won
2016	30th PMPC Star Awards for Television	Best Celebrity Talk Show Host	"MARS" (2016)	Nominated
2016	Lip Sync Battle Philippines			Won
2017	31st PMPC Star Awards for Television	Best Celebrity Talk Show Host	"MARS" (2017)	Nominated
2018	32nd PMPC Star Awards for Television	Best Celebrity Talk Show Host	"MARS" (2018)	Nominated
2019	Anak TV Seal Awards		"MARS" (2019)	Won
2020	Rawr Awards	Favorite TV Host	"MARS" (2020)	Nominated
2021	34th PMPC Star Awards for Television	Best Celebrity Talk Show Host	"MARS" (2020)	Nominated
2022	Gintong Parangal	Mahusay Na Host Sa Telebisyon	"MARS" (2021)	Won
2023	35th PMPC Star Awards for Television	Best Celebrity Talk Show Host	"MARS" (2021)	Nominated
2026	6th TAG Victorious Awards Chicago	Best Actress	"Mommy Dearest" (2025)	Won
