= Seiko Nakano =

Japanese former voice actress (born 1952)

- 中野 聖子
- Born: 2 August 1952 (age 74); Hiroshima Prefecture, Japan
- Occupation: Voice actress
- Years active: 1974-1990

Seiko Nakano (中野 聖子, Nakano Seiko; born 2 August 1952) is a Japanese former voice actress. She has contributed to more than twenty films and television series since 1974 until 1990.

== Selected filmography ==
Anime television series
Year	Title	Role	Notes
1977–1978	Angie Girl	Frank	
1981–1986	Dr. Slump	Gatchan	
1983–1984	Creamy Mami, the Magic Angel	Pino Pino	
1984	Cream Lemon	Peruru	
1985	Princess Sarah	Jessie	

Film
Year	Title	Role	Notes
1981	Swan Lake	Princess Francine	
1983	Barefoot Gen	Eiko Nakaoka	
1986	Barefoot Gen 2	Eiko Nakaoka	Flashback
1987	Wicked City	Female Co-Worker	
1988	Dragon Ball: Mystical Adventure	Gatchan	

=== Dubbing ===
- Watership Down (Clover)
