= Arriba, Arriba! =

- Title card
- Genre: Sitcom
- Directed by: John-D Lazatin; Gilbert Perez
- Starring: Jolina Magdangal; Camille Prats; Edgar Mortiz; Sandy Andolong; Heart Evangelista
- Opening theme: "Arriba, Arriba!" by Jolina Magdangal (2000–2002)/Heart Evangelista (2002–2003)
- Country of origin: Philippines
- Original language: Filipino
- No. of episodes: 137

Production
- Executive producer: Nini Patricia S. Collada
- Running time: 1 hour

Original release
- Network: ABS-CBN
- Release: December 9, 2000 – August 9, 2003

Arriba, Arriba! (lit. 'up, up!') is a Philippine television situational comedy (SitCom) series broadcast by ABS-CBN. Directed by John D. Lazatin and Gilbert G. Perez, it stars Jolina Magdangal with Camille Prats, Sandy Andolong, Edgar Mortiz, Heart Evangelista, Rufa Mae Quinto, Ai-Ai delas Alas and Johnny Delgado. It aired on the network's Saturday afternoon line up from December 9, 2000 to August 9, 2003, replacing Oki Doki Doc and was replaced by Home Along Da Airport.

== Cast ==
- Jolina Magdangal as Winona Arriba (2000–2002)
- Camille Prats as Biba Arriba
- Edgar Mortiz as Solomon Divino "Sodi" Arriba
- Sandy Andolong as Isabel "Mamsi" Arriba
- Johnny Delgado as Yani Makalupa
- Heart Evangelista as Monina Arriba (2002–2003)
- John Lapus as Sweet
- Rufa Mae Quinto as Jenny
- Ai-Ai delas Alas as Venus Arriba
- Danilo Barrios as Tommy Gil Puyat
- Jean Saburit as Rosemarie Gil Puyat
- Don Laurel as Mark Gil Puyat
- Bentong as Steven
- Hyubs Azarcon as Atong

== See also ==
- List of programs broadcast by ABS-CBN
