= Mommy Dearest (TV series) =

2025 Philippine television drama series

- Title card
- Genre: Drama; Thriller
- Created by: Brylle Tabora
- Written by: Luningning Interino-Ribay; Jimuel Dela Cruz
- Directed by: Ralfh Manuel Malabunga
- Creative director: Aloy Adlawan
- Starring: Camille Prats; Shayne Sava; Katrina Halili
- Opening theme: "Patuloy Lang" by Jessica Villarubin
- Country of origin: Philippines
- Original language: Tagalog
- No. of episodes: 103

Production
- Camera setup: Multiple-camera setup
- Running time: 34 minutes
- Production company: GMA Entertainment Group

Original release
- Network: GMA Network
- Release: February 24 – July 18, 2025

Mommy Dearest is a 2025 Philippine television drama series broadcast by GMA Network. Directed by Ralfh Manuel Malabunga, it stars Camille Prats, Shayne Sava and Katrina Halili in the title role. It premiered on February 24, 2025 on the network's Afternoon Prime line up. The series concluded on July 18, 2025, with a total of 103 episodes.

The series is streaming online on YouTube.

== Premise ==
Olive takes care of her ill daughter Mookie. With the help of their maid, Emma – they both look after Mookie. Due to Emma losing her own offspring in the past, she will treat and love Mookie like her own biological daughter.

== Cast and characters ==
Lead cast

- Camille Prats as Olive Caparas / Jade Caparas
- Shayne Sava as Maria Angela "Mookie" Caparas / Kayla Joseco
- Katrina Halili as Emma Espiritu-Joseco

Supporting cast

- Dion Ignacio as Danilo Joseco
- Prince Carlos as Zayn Villanueva
- Amy Austria as Ligaya Espiritu
- Mel Martinez as Wiro Sales
- Viveika Ravanes as Kutsy Bernales
- Muriel Lomadilla as Flor Flores
- Winwyn Marquez as Astrid Zamora

Guest cast

- Rocco Nacino as Logan Alvarez
- Lito Pimentel as Ador

== Development ==
The series was announced by GMA Network on January 1, 2024. Philippine actress and director Gina Alajar was hired to direct the series. In 2025, Ralfh Malabunga replaces Alajar to direct the series.

=== Casting ===
On January 13, 2024, the cast was announced on the series' story conference and script reading. The cast announcement included Camille Prats, Shayne Sava, Katrina Halili, Dion Ignacio, Prince Carlos, Amy Austria, Mel Martinez, Viveika Ravanes and Riel Lomadilla.

== Ratings ==
According to AGB Nielsen Philippines' Nationwide Urban Television Audience Measurement People in television homes, the pilot episode of Mommy Dearest earned a 6.6% rating. The finale earned a 7.4% rating.
