= Fumio Kurokawa =

Japanese storyboard artist and director (1932–2024)

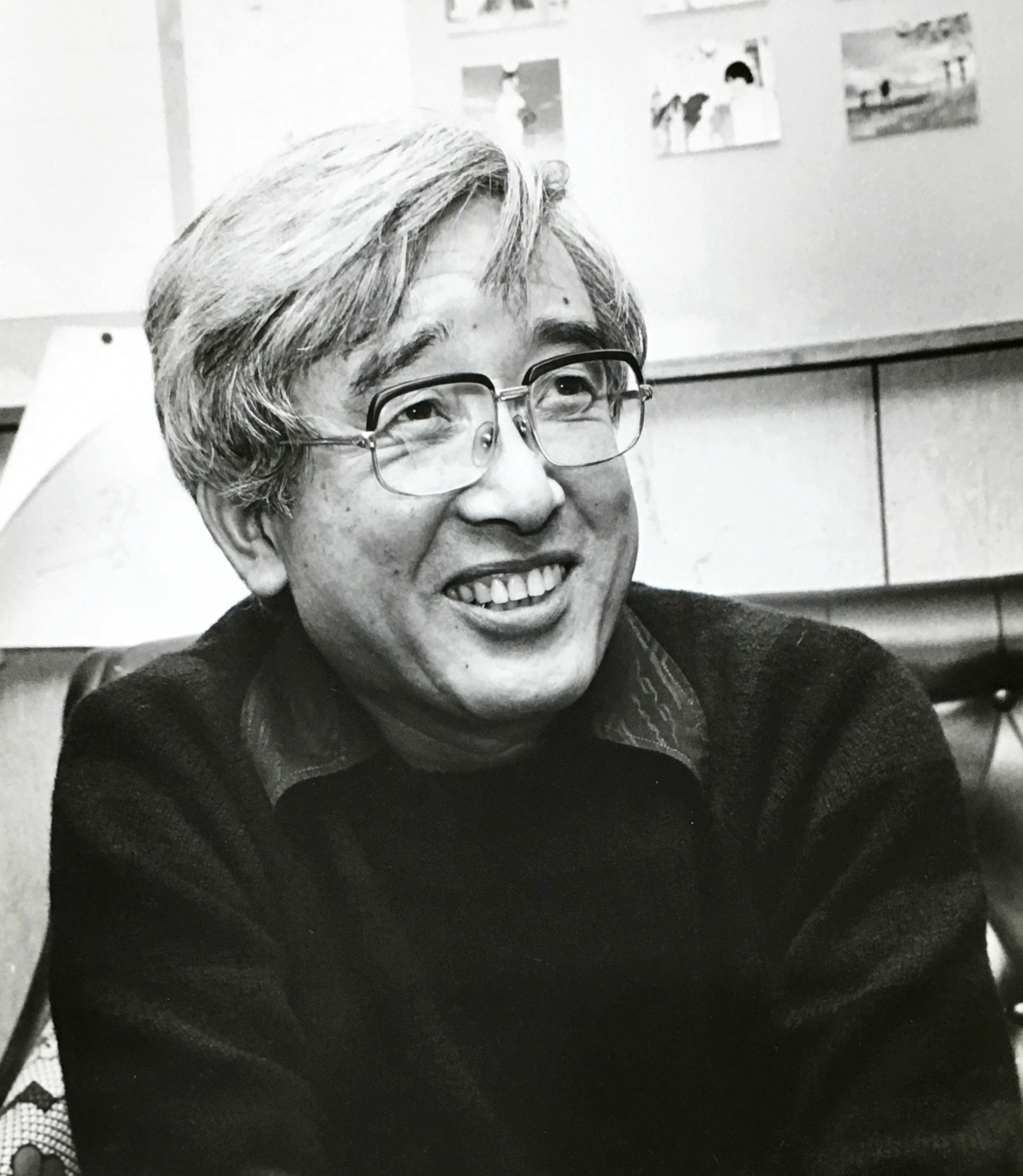

Fumio Kurokawa (黒川 文男, Kurokawa Fumio; October 20, 1932 – April 10, 2024) was a Japanese storyboard artist and animated film director. He directed a number of animated television series produced by Nippon Animation during the 1970s and 1980s. Kurokawa was the series director of Animated Classics of Japanese Literature, included among the "100 Must-See Japanese Animation Masterpieces" in the 2007 encyclopedia Anime Classics Zettai!. Kurokawa died on April 10, 2024, at the age of 91.

== Filmography ==
Year	TV series	Studio	Role	Reference
1992	Christopher Columbus	Nippon Animation	Director	
1989–1990	Jungle Book Shōnen Mowgli	Nippon Animation	Director	
1989	Celestial Prince or Utsunomiko (subtitled Earth Chapter)	Nippon Animation, Toei Animation	Director	
1987	Grimm Masterpiece Theatre	Nippon Animation	Director (1 episode)	
1987	Tales of Little Women	Nippon Animation	Director; with Kazumi Fukushima, Kōzō Kusuba, and Yugo Serikawa	
1986	The Story of Pollyanna, Girl of Love	Nippon Animation	Storyboard artist	
1986	Animated Classics of Japanese Literature	Nippon Animation	Director	
1985	Little Princess Sara	Nippon Animation, Aniplex	Director	
1984	Noozles	Nippon Animation	Storyboard artist	
1983	Aesop's Fables	Nippon Animation	Director; with Eiji Okabe and Jun Hagiwara	
1983	Story of the Alps: My Annette	Nippon Animation	Storyboard artist	
1981	Ai no Gakko Cuore Monogatari	Nippon Animation	Animator; with Iku Suzuki	
1981	Around the World with Willy Fog	BRB Internacional, Nippon Animation	Director; with Luis Ballester	
1981	Swiss Family Robinson	Nippon Animation	Storyboard artist	
1980	Tsurikichi Sanpei	Nippon Animation	Director (Episode)	
1980	Little El Cid no Boken	Nippon Animation	Director	
1977	Angie Girl (or The Casebook of Charlotte Holmes)	Nippon Animation	Director; with Shinya Yamada	
1977	Monarch: The Big Bear of Tallac (or Seton Animal Chronicle: Bearcub Jacky)	Nippon Animation	Director; with Yoshihiro Kuroda	
1976	Little Lulu and Her Little Friends	Nippon Animation	Director	
1975	Arabian Nights: Sinbad's Adventures	Nippon Animation	Director; with Kunihiko Okazaki	
1972–1974	Kagaku ninja tai Gatchaman or Battle of the Planets	Tatsunoko Production	Director (105 episodes); with Eiko Toriumi, Hiroshi Sasagawa, Jinzo Toriumi and Katsuhisa Yamada	
1971	Animentary Ketsudan or Animentary: Critical Moments	Tatsunoko Production	Director; with Hideo Makino and Ippei Kuri	
1969–1971	Attack No. 1	TMS Entertainment	Director (34 episodes)	
1968–1969	Sabu to Ichi Torimono Hikae	Mushi Production, Studio Zero, Toei Animation	Director (3 episodes)	
