= Michio Takeyama =

Japanese writer and German literary scholar (1903–1984)

- Takeyama Michio
- Born: July 17, 1903; Osaka, Japan
- Died: June 15, 1984 (aged 80); Kamakura, Kanagawa, Japan
- Occupations: Writer, literary critic, translator of German literature
- Writing career
- Genre: novels
- Notable work: Harp of Burma

Michio Takeyama (竹山 道雄, Takeyama Michio; 17 July 1903 – 15 June 1984) was a Japanese writer, literary critic and scholar of German literature, active in Shōwa period Japan.

== Early life ==
Takeyama was born in Osaka, but moved frequently as his father, a bank employee, was often transferred. From 1907 to 1913, he lived in Keijō (modern Seoul), Korea, then under Japanese rule. After graduating from Tokyo Imperial University's Department of German Literature, he was sent by Ministry of Education to Europe, where he studied for three years in Paris and Berlin.

== Literary career ==
On returning home in 1932, Takeyama taught German language as a professor at the First Higher School, and also translated works of German literature into Japanese. Among the works he translated were Goethe's An Anthology, Nietzsche's Thus Spoke Zarathustra and Out of My Life and Thought: An Autobiography by Albert Schweitzer.

However, despite his close connections with Germany, he was very leery of the Tripartite Alliance between Japan, Nazi Germany and Fascist Italy, and published an editorial called Doitsu, atarashiki chūsei? ('Germany, the medieval age refurbished?'), in which he was critical of foreign totalitarianism.

In 1944, Takeyama relocated to Kamakura, Kanagawa prefecture after his home in Tokyo was destroyed in the air raids. He lived in Kamakura until his death in 1984. After World War II, Takeyama became famous for his novel, Biruma no Tategoto ("Harp of Burma"), which was serialized in Akatonbo ('The Red Dragonfly'), a literary magazine aimed primarily at children, over 1947–1948, before being published in book format in October 1948. An award-winning novel, it was subsequently translated into English under UNESCO sponsorship, and made into a well-known 1956 movie. In 1948, he wrote Scars, set in northern China, which Takeyama had visited in 1931 and 1938.

In 1950, during the height of the popularity of socialism in Japanese politics, Takeyama again spoke out, this time against Stalinism, and warned that totalitarianism can come from the left end of the political spectrum, as well as the right.

In 1951, Takeyama resigned his teaching position in favor of literary criticism, publishing Shōwa no Seishin-shi ("A Psychological History of the Shōwa period") and Ningen ni Tsuite ("On Human Beings"); however, throughout his career, Takeyama had a very diverse range of interests.

In 1959, Takeyama created a literary magazine, Jiyu ("Freedom"), together with fellow novelist Hirabayashi Taiko. He also started to write travelogues. His works Koto Henreki: Nara (Pilgrimage to the ancient capital, Nara), and Nihonjin to Bi (The Japanese and Beauty) combine his broad and deep understanding of the classic arts of Japan and his sensitivity to European literature. He also wrote Yoroppa no Tabi ("Travels in Europe") and Maboroshi to Shinjitsu: Watashi no Sobieto Kembun ("Fantasy and Truth: My Observations of the Soviet Union"), in which he analyzed Western civilization and his perception of the failure of the communist system in the Soviet Union.

Takeyama became a member of the Japan Art Academy in 1983, and in the same year he was awarded the Kikuchi Kan Prize for an anthology of eight of his most notable works. He died in 1984, and his grave is at the Kamakura Reien Cemetery.

== See also ==
- Japanese literature
- List of Japanese authors
