= The Burmese Harp =

1948 children's novel by Michio Takeyama

- Japanese edition
- Author: Michio Takeyama
- Genre: children's novel
- Publication date: 1948
- Publication place: Japan
- ISBN: 0-8048-0232-7

The Burmese Harp (ビルマの竪琴, Biruma no tategoto), also known as Harp of Burma, is a children's novel by Michio Takeyama. It was first published in 1948 and was the basis of two films by Kon Ichikawa – one released in 1956 and a color remake in 1985. Both films were major successes. A translation of the novel into English by Howard Hibbett was published in 1966 by Charles E. Tuttle Company in cooperation with UNESCO (ISBN 0-8048-0232-7).

== Plot ==
Takeyama wrote the story wanting to give young readers hope after defeat in WWII by emphasizing the traditional Buddhist ideal of altruism, embodied in a soldier hero, Mizushima. Captured by the British led Indian forces, following the surrender of Japan in July 1945, Mizushima is a harp-playing Japanese prisoner of war who volunteers to persuade a resisting Japanese unit to surrender. His attempt fails and in the ensuing battle he is left behind, assumed dead. Mizushima takes the clothes of a Buddhist monk, but then reappears as the monk to his former comrades. His comrades, led by Captain Inouye, gift the monk a blue parakeet trained to say "Mizushima come home", but Mizushima elects to stay behind in Burma to bury the dead. The title of the book comes from the saung, the musical instrument adopted by the soldier. The novel is more open than the 1956 film about Japan's responsibility for the war. In Takeyama's novel one of the soldiers talks of the "terrible trouble" which Japan has brought to Burma, and the hero soldier-become monk Mizushima criticizes Japan's colonial ambitions as "wasteful desires" and the Japanese having "forgotten the most important things in life", a perspective which is downplayed in the film.

== Adaptations ==
There are two film adaptations and an animated television version (all with the same title as the novel in Japanese):

- The Burmese Harp (1956), a black-and-white Japanese film by Kon Ichikawa – a critical success nominated for the Academy Award for Best Foreign Language Film of 1956
- The Burmese Harp (1985), a color Japanese film, also by Kon Ichikawa – the number one Japanese film on the domestic market in 1985 and the second largest Japanese box office hit up to that time
- The Harp of Burma (1986), a Japanese animated television adaptation by Nippon Animation as part of Animated Classics of Japanese Literature
