= Taeko Nakanishi =

Japanese voice actress (born 1931)

- 中西 妙子
- Born: February 11, 1931 (age 95); Hiroshima, Hiroshima Prefecture, Japan
- Occupation: Voice actress
- Years active: 1950–2007

Taeko Nakanishi (中西 妙子, Nakanishi Taeko; born February 11, 1931) is a Japanese actress who specializes in voice acting and previously worked for Aoni Production. She is best known as the voices of the various Panther Claw villains in Cutie Honey, and the Hell Tree in the first arc of the Sailor Moon R series. She also voiced Chris MacNeil in the original Japanese dub of The Exorcist.

== Filmography ==
=== Television animation ===
- GeGeGe no Kitarō (1971) as Hone-onna
- Cutie Honey (1973) as Tomohawk Panther, Iron Shadow, Jumbo Panther, Breast Claw, Blade Panther and Snake Pather
- Alps no Shōjo Heidi (1974) as Mrs. Dete
- Vicke Viking (1974) as Irba
- Dog of Flanders (1975) as Ellina Cogez
- Candy Candy (1976) as Sister Pony, Grandaunt Elory, Narrator
- Galaxy Express 999 (1978) as Narrator
- Akai Tori (1979) as Narrator
- King Arthur (1979) as Yulliens, Ashura
- Little Women (1981) as Narrator
- Lady Georgie (1983) as Barbara ( episode 19)
- Glass Mask (1984) as Chigusa Tsukikage
- Princess Sarah (1985) as Miss Minchin
- Little Women (1987) as Mary "Marmee" March
- Kiteretsu Daihyakka (1991) as Aiko
- Sailor Moon R (1993) as Hell Tree
- Emma - A Victorian Romance (2005) as Kelly Stowner
- Emma - A Victorian Romance: Second Act (2007) as Kelly Stowner

=== OVA ===
- 2001 Nights (1987) as the narrator
- Sohryuden: Legend of the Dragon Kings (1993) as Xi Wangmu
- Master Keaton (1998) as Sachiko Shiratori

=== Movies ===
- Ringing Bell (1978) as Chirin's Mother
- Swan Lake (1981) as Queen
- The Fantastic Adventures of Unico (1981) as Grandmother
- The Wizard of Oz (1982) as Aunt Em and Servant
- Papa Mama Bye bye (1984) as Aunt
- Penguin's Memory: Shiawase Monogatari (1985) as Helen
- The Five Star Stories (1989) as Narrator

=== Video games ===
- Clock Tower II: The Struggle Within (1998) as Yayoi Takano, Atsumi Kishi

=== Dubbing ===
- The Andromeda Strain (1974 TV Asahi edition) as Dr. Ruth Leavitt (Kate Reid)
- Ben-Hur (1981 TV Asahi edition) as Miriam (Martha Scott)
- Cocoon (1988 TV Asahi edition) as Bess McCarthy (Gwen Verdon)
- Death Wish (1980 TV Asahi edition) as Joanna Kersey (Hope Lange)
- The Diary of Anne Frank as Petronella Van Daan (Shelley Winters)
- The Exorcist (1980 TBS edition) as Chris MacNeil (Ellen Burstyn)
- Flesh for Frankenstein as Baroness Katrin Frankenstein (Monique van Vooren)
- The Good Son as Alice Davenport (Jacqueline Brookes)
- The Miracle Worker (1975 TV Asahi edition) as Anne Sullivan (Anne Bancroft)
- The Sound of Music as Mother Abbess (Peggy Wood)
- Star Wars Episode IV: A New Hope (1985 NTV edition) as Beru Lars (Shelagh Fraser)
