= Princess Sara =

Japanese anime series

- Title card
- 小公女セーラ
- Genre: Drama; Historical; Slice of life
- Based on: A Little Princess by Frances Hodgson Burnett
- Directed by: Fumio Kurokawa
- Music by: Yasuo Higuchi
- Country of origin: Japan
- Original language: Japanese
- No. of episodes: 46

Production
- Executive producer: Koichi Motohashi
- Producers: Junzo Nakajima; Taihei Ishikawa
- Production companies: Fuji Television; Nippon Animation

Original release
- Network: FNS (Fuji TV)
- Release: January 6 – December 29, 1985

Princess Sara (Japanese: 小公女(プリンセス)セーラ, Hepburn: Shōkōjo Sēra; lit. "Little Princess Sara"), also spelled as Princess Sarah for disambiguation purposes, is a Japanese anime television series that was based on the 1905 children's novel A Little Princess by Frances Hodgson Burnett. It aired on Fuji TV from January to December 1985, as part of Nippon Animation's World Masterpiece Theater. The series follows Sara Crewe, a young student of an all-girls boarding school who later becomes orphaned and is forced to work as a servant.

== Plot ==
In 1885, Captain Ralph Crewe, a wealthy English widower living in British-ruled India, enrolls his ten-year-old beautiful daughter Sara at the Miss Minchin's Select Seminary for Young Ladies in London. She excels in her studies and is loved deeply by her classmates and friends, but earns the hatred of class representative Lavinia Herbert and the grudge of the headmistress Miss Minchin. On her ninth birthday, Sara learns of her father's death and bankruptcy from an infuriated Miss Minchin, who decides to hire the orphaned girl as an unpaid maid in the school. Miss Minchin and Lavinia attempt to make Sara's life miserable and break her spirit, but with the help of her friends, Sara tries to endure all the hardships with her kindness and imagination.

== Characters ==
Sara Crewe as she appears in the series

- Sara Crewe (セーラ・クルー, Sēra Kurū)

Voiced by: Sumi Shimamoto (Japanese); Andrea Kwan (English)
The main protagonist of the series and a student of Miss Minchin's Select Seminary for Young Ladies, who is the daughter of Ralph Crewe, Sara is a kind-hearted, cute, beautiful, compassionate, brave, optimistic, imaginative, and intelligent girl.

- Captain Ralph Crewe (ラルフ・クルー, Rarufu Kurū)

Voiced by: Banjō Ginga
Sara's loving and devoted father, he died from his place India, leaving Sara to be poor and maiden by Miss Minchin.

- Miss Maria Minchin (マリア・ミンチン)

Voiced by: Taeko Nakanishi
The strict, cruel headmistress of Miss Minchin's Select Seminary for Young Ladies, and Amelia's older sister.

- Miss Amelia Minchin (アメリア・ミンチン, Ameria Minchin)

Voiced by: Yuri Nashiwa
Miss Minchin's kind but meek younger sister, who is a school teacher in Miss Minchin's Select Seminary for Young Ladies.

- Lavinia Herbert (ラビニア・ハーバート, Rabinia Hābāto)

Voiced by: Eiko Yamada
The oldest and the most beautiful student and of Miss Minchin's Select Seminary for Young Ladies and Sara's (former) rival, who is bitterly jealous of her wealth and popularity. Lavinia is prideful, sadistic, cynical, and manipulative. In the series finale, she has reformed and becomes a friend of Sara.

- Becky (ベッキー, Bekkī)

Voiced by: Mie Suzuki
A scullery maid in Miss Minchin's Select Seminary for Young Ladies and Sara's closest best friend, who lives in the attic of the school. Becky is an optimistic, clumsy, and hardworking girl who comes from the village of Ashfield.

- Peter (ピーター, Pītā)

Voiced by: Chika Sakamoto
A street-smart boy and Sara's loyal best friend, who greatly admires her. Cheerful and hardworking, Peter is good at driving a carriage and is also seen working at a market. He is also considered as a love interest to Sara.

- Ermengarde St. John (アーメンガード・セントジョン, Āmengādo Sentojon)

Voiced by: Maki Yaosaka
A student of Miss Minchin's Select Seminary for Young Ladies and Sara's schoolmate and best friend, Ermengarde is a plump girl who is slow at learning. She is also a victim of Lavinia's bullying.

- Lottie Legh (ロッティ・レイ, Rotti Rei)

Voiced by: Naoko Watanabe
The youngest student of Miss Minchin's Select Seminary for Young Ladies and Sara's schoolmate and daughter-figure, Lottie is a four-year-old girl who is prone to tantrums.

- Jessie (ジェシー, Jeshī) and Gertrude (ガートルード, Gātorūdo)

Voiced by: Seiko Nakano and Harumi Iizuka (as Jessie), Run Sasaki (as Gertrude)
Two students of Miss Minchin's Select Seminary for Young Ladies who are Lavinia's closest schoolmates.

- Molly (モーリー, Mōrī)

Voiced by: Asami Mukaidono
A resident maid of Miss Minchin's Select Seminary for Young Ladies and James' wife.

- James (ジェームス, Jēmusu)

Voiced by: Daisuke Gōri
A resident cook of Miss Minchin's Select Seminary for Young Ladies and Molly's husband.

- Mariette (マリエット, Marietto)

Voiced by: Sanae Takagi
A maid in Miss Minchin's Select Seminary for Young Ladies who is serving for Sara.

- Monsieur Dufarge (デュファルジュ先生, Dyufaruju sensei)

Voiced by: Toshiya Ueda
A French teacher at Miss Minchin's Select Seminary for Young Ladies.

- Mr. Tom Carrisford (トム・クリスフォード, Tomu Kurisufōdo)

Voiced by: Shūsei Nakamura
A kind old man who lives in another house next to Miss Minchin's seminary, Mr. Carrisford is Ralph Crewe's best friend.

- Ram Dass (ラムダス, Ramudasu)

Voiced by: Hideyuki Tanaka
An Indian lascar serving for Mr. Carrisford. Ram Dass has a pet monkey called Surya (スリャ, Surya). He is the only Indian who speaks English, unlike his two partners.

- Mr. Carmichael (カーマイケル弁護士, Kāmaikeru bengoshi)

Voiced by: Yusaku Yara
Mr. Carrisford's solicitor and confidant.

- Donald Carmichael (ドナルド・カーマイケル, Donarudo Kāmaikeru)

Voiced by: Mitsuko Horie
Mr. Carmichael's polite, generous son.

- Janet Carmichael (ジャネット・カーマイケル, Janetto Kāmaikeru)

Voiced by: Asami Mukaidono
Mr. Carmichael's daughter and Donald's sister.

- Mrs. Carmichael (カーマイケルさん, Kāmaikeru-san)

Mother of Janet and Donald.

=== Other characters ===
Mr. Barrow (バロー弁護士, Barō bengoshi)
Voiced by: Yuzuru Fujimoto
A solicitor who is invested into Ralph Crewe's business.
Lavinia's father (ラビニアの父, Rabinia no chichi)
Voiced by: Kazuhiko Kishino
Lavinia's father. Unlike his family members, he is angry with his daughter, and is the reason of the cruelty of his daughter against Sarah.
Lavinia's mother (ラビニアの母, Rabinia no haha)
Voiced by: Kumiko Takizawa
Lavinia's mother.
Anne (アンヌ, Annu)
Voiced by: Chieko Honda
An orphaned street child who meets Sara outside the bakery.
Teddy (テディ, Tedi)
Voiced by: Kazue Ikura
Becky's younger brother.
Martha (マーサ, Māsa)
Voiced by: Chie Kōjiro
Becky's younger sister.
Jim (ジム, Jimu)
Voiced by: Sanae Takagi
Peter's friend.
Dr. Wild (ワイルド医師, Wairudo ishi)
Voiced by: Ryūji Saikachi
An alcoholic doctor.
Old Priest (老司祭, Rō shisai)
Voiced by: Yasuo Muramatsu
A kind-hearted priest in a church in the city.
Soldier ((兵士, Heishi)
A soldier from London who helps Sara pick up the potatoes during a rainy day.
Baker's wife (パン屋の夫人, Pan-ya no fujin)
- Voiced by: Atsuko Mine
The owner of a bakery in the city. When she saw Sara giving bread to Anne, she described Anne as an "angelic child". Later, she took Anne to her bakery.
Florist owner (花屋の所有者, Hanaya no shoyū-sha)
- Voiced by: Sanae Takagi
An acquaintance of Peter, he runs a stall flower shop in the market. She remembers Sarah when she was a young lady and cares about her.
Clothes shop owner (洋服店のオーナー, Yōfuku-ten no ōnā)
- Voiced by: Takuzo Kamiyama
The original owner of the doll "Emily" at a clothes store in the city. Emily, which is the signboard of the store that is not for sale, is handed over to Sarah, and at the same time she receives an order for Sarah's clothes (measurement at this time will be a hint later). He has also saved a fallen Sarah.
The other two Indian servants (他の二人のインド人使用人, Hoka no ni-ri no Indo hito shiyō hito)
Ram Dass's two partners who don't speak English unlike Ram Dass.
Peter's Uncle (ピーターの叔父, Pītā no oji)
He is a vegetable merchant and he helps Sarah because of stealing money.
Peter's Father (ピーターの父, Pītā no chichi)
He is handicapped with his crutch.
Peter's Mother (ピーターの母親, Pītā no hahaoya)
She is contagious and weak.
Maggie (マギー, Magī)
She is responsible for the match factory.

=== Animals ===
Ceaser (シーザー, Sīzā)
- Voiced by: Eiko Yamada
A domestic cat of Miss Minchin's seminary.
Bonaparte (ボナパルト, Bonaparuto)
- Voiced by: Chika Sakamoto
A parrot that Sara brought from India at the time of admission. At the beginning, Sarah's father Crewe brought Bonaparte from India to Miss Minchin's seminary in London as a companion for Sarah. When Sarah faces the death of her father, it was taken away by Mr. Barrow as a mortgage of Crewe's "debt", until Sarah returned to her original life, and returned to Sarah's side with the help of Peter and Mr. Carmichael.
Jump (ジャンプ, Jampu)
A horse which has a white diamond-shaped spots on the forehead that Ralph kept in Minchin. At the beginning, when Sarah was a rich daughter, Captain Ralph bought it as an exclusive carriage for Sarah. When Sarah faces the death of her father, it was taken away by Mr. Barrow as a mortgage of Crewe's "debt", until Sarah returned to her original life, and returned to Sarah's side with the help of Peter and Mr. Carmichael.
Surya (スリャ, Surya)
Ram Dass' mischievous monkey.
Boris (ボリス, Boris)
Tom Carrisford's breed resembles a large long-haired Afghan hound, which in the original work is actually the dog raised by the Carmichael family.

== Production ==
Princess Sara, directed by Fumio Kurokawa and produced by Nippon Animation, being the eleventh entry in the World Masterpiece Theater, aired in Japan between January 6 and December 29, 1985, after 46 episodes on Fuji TV. Shunji Saida is the character designer for the anime series. Similar to other series in the franchise such as Heidi, Dog of Flanders, and 3000 Leagues in Search of Mother, the writers adapted the original novel by adding new characters and adventures to reach a total of 46 episodes, while still remaining faithful to the original storyline without drastically altering it.

The novel does not go much into detail about Sara's daily life at the school, focusing instead on her inner thoughts and how she finds resilience through her imagination. In contrast, the series takes a more realistic approach reminiscent of a Dickensian tale, depicting the hardships and mistreatments Sara endures every day after becoming poor. Both Becky and Lavinia are given more important roles, and an original character — the street boy Peter — is added among Sara's friends. Lavinia's role, in particular, emphasizes bullying. A backstory is also provided for Miss Minchin, who, having worked hard to succeed after a poor upbringing, despises Sara for having always had everything easily. Additionally, while Sara's character in the novel can be outspoken at times, in the series she becomes more obedient and submissive, never openly rebelling, in line with Japanese values that regard politeness and discretion as important virtues. Another difference is the time span of the story: about seven years in the novel, starting when Sara enters boarding school at age 7, whereas in the series it spans about one year, starting when Sara enters at age 10. The age differences between the characters are also different: in the book, the age gap between Sara and Lavinia is 6 years, compared to 3 years in the series, while the age difference between Sara and Becky is 5 years, whereas in the series they are the same age; in the novel, both Lavinia and Becky are older than Sara.

A Little Princess was already enormously popular in Japan at the time the series was produced, having been first introduced to Japanese readers in 1910. It had also previously been adapted into anime in 1978, as 11 episodes in the anthology series Manga Fairy Tales of the World. Some of the additions made to the plot of the series are reminiscent of those of the 1978 version: the emphasis on bullying and mistreatments, the introduction of a street boy as one of Sara's friends (in the 1978 version there are three boys), Sara's serious illness cured by her friends (which in the 1978 version affected Becky), Sara's expulsion from the boarding school, her forgiveness of Lavinia, and her return to the school after making a large donation.

== Music ==
The musical score is composed by Yasuo Higuchi. The series features two pieces of theme music, both performed by Satoko Shimonari: the opening theme is "Hana no Sasayaki" (花のささやき, lit. 'Whisper of a Flower'), and the ending theme is "Himawari" (ひまわり, lit. 'Sunflower').

== International broadcast ==
=== Italian version ===
In Italy, the series was broadcast on Italia 1 under the title Lovely Sara, starting on February 18, 1986, shortly after its original Japanese airing ended. The anime was highly successful in Italy, where it was re-run many times on Italia 1 and other channels. The Italian dubbing was produced by Studio P.V. in Milan and featured several name changes, such as Sara Crewe becoming Sara Morris, Maria Minchin becoming Gertrude Minci, Ermengarde becoming Margherita, Lottie becoming Lalla, Emily becoming Priscilla, and Gertrude becoming Barbara. The Italian opening and ending theme was sung by Cristina D'Avena. The HD remastered version was released for streaming by Yamato Video on Amazon Prime Video in 2022.

=== French version ===
The French dub was broadcast on La Cinq under the title Princesse Sarah, starting on March 1, 1987, and was based on the Italian version. This version also includes some name changes, such as Miss Minchin becoming Mademoiselle Mangin and Ermengarde becoming Marguerite, while other original names were restored. Cristina D'Avena also sang the French version of the Italian opening theme. The French version was also well received, with multiple reruns over the years, and has since been made available for streaming.

=== Filipino version ===
The Filipino dub of the series aired in the Philippines on ABS-CBN in the early 90s and became very popular. The HD remastered version aired on TV5 in 2025.

=== German version ===
The series was dubbed in German on RTL2 on March 8, 1993, then ORF1 on August 19, 1998, and tm3 on November 22, 1998.

=== English version ===
The series aired on Animax, who later broadcast the series across its respective networks worldwide, including its English language networks in South Asia and Southeast Asia, dubbing and translating the series into English under the title Princess Sarah. Animax's version was the series' only English translation, and the series has yet to be commercially released in the United States.

=== Arabic version ===
The series was dubbed in Arabic under the title Sally (سالي) and was a huge success in the Arab World and widely popular, spanning reruns in the 1990s and early 2000s and was subsequently added to Netflix MENA in November 2020.

=== Polish version ===
The Polish dub was broadcast on TVP 2 and then reruns on TVP Polonia and TVP Regionalna.

== Related media ==
=== Film ===
The success and popularity of the anime series in the Philippines inspired a live-action film adaptation. Sarah... Ang Munting Prinsesa (lit. "Sarah, The Little Princess"), produced by Star Cinema and directed by Romy Suzara, was released on June 7, 1995. The film stars Camille Prats as Sarah Crewe. In the mid-2010s, the film was digitally restored and remastered by the ABS-CBN Film Restoration Project, which to date are restoring old damaged classic Filipino films to a high-definition format.

=== Television drama ===
A Filipino television drama adaptation of the series, produced by ABS-CBN, aired from November 12 to December 21, 2007, on the Primetime Bida block. The series stars Sharlene San Pedro as Sarah Crewe. The story is loosely based on the anime series and took further creative liberties from the original source material, with fantasy elements being introduced in the story.

== Reception ==
Princess Sara has been selected as one of the best 100 Japanese anime series of all time by the viewers of TV Asahi.

== International titles ==
- 小公女セーラ (Japanese)
- Sarah: Ang Munting Princesa (Filipino)
- Die kleine Prinzessin Sara (German)
- Princesa Sara (Spanish)
- Little Princess (English)
- Lovely Sara (Italian)
- Mała księżniczka Sara (Polish)
- Princess Sara (English)
- Princesse Sarah (French)
- Sali سالي (Arabic and Sorani)
- Sarah, Ang Munting Prinsesa (Tagalog)
- Küçük Prenses (Turkish)
- سارا کرو (Persian)
- 莎拉公主 (Chinese)
- 소공녀 세라 Sogongnyeo Serra (Korean)

== See also ==
- Oshin
