= List of Anne of Green Gables (1979 TV series) episodes =

Anne of Green Gables (Japanese: 赤毛のアン, Hepburn: Akage no An; lit. 'Red-haired Anne') is a 1979 anime television series based on Lucy Maud Montgomery's 1908 novel. The series, produced by Nippon Animation, was written and directed by Isao Takahata, and premiered on 7 January 1979 on Fuji Television. The 50-episode series was the 5th of Nippon Animation's World Masterpiece Theater.

== Episodes ==
No.	Title	Directed by	Written by	Original release date
1	"Matthew Cuthbert Is Surprised" "Mashū Kasubāto Odoroku" (Japanese: マシュウ・カスバート驚く)	Isao Takahata	Isao Takahata; Shigeki Chiba	January 7, 1979
Anne Shirley, a beautiful little girl, arrives at a rural train station on Prince Edward Island. She meets Matthew Cuthbert who has come to collect her. He is confused and unsure what to do. Reluctantly, he decides to take her to Green Gables, the farm he owns with his younger sister Marilla in the village of Avonlea.
2	"Marilla Cuthbert Is Surprised" "Marira Kasubāto Odoroku" (Japanese: マリラ・カスバート驚く)	Isao Takahata	Isao Takahata; Shigeki Chiba	January 14, 1979
Matthew brings the little girl, Anne Shirley, to Green Gables, and she is blissfully happy at the thought of being able to live there. Marilla is less than pleased, but allows Anne to stay the night.
3	"Morning at Green Gables" "Gurīn Geiburuzu no Asa" (Japanese: グリーン・ゲイブルズの朝)	Isao Takahata	Isao Takahata; Aiko Isomura	January 21, 1979
Anne's first morning at Green Gables is marred by the knowledge that she will not be staying. Matthew expresses a desire to keep Anne, but Marilla decides to take her to Mrs. Spencer and inquire about the mistake.
4	"Anne's History" "An Oitachi o Kataru" (Japanese: アン・生い立ちを語る)	Isao Takahata	Isao Takahata	January 28, 1979
On the way to White Sands, Anne tells Marilla of her life so far. Marilla begins to feel pity for Anne, passed from home to home and starved for love.
5	"Marilla Makes Up Her Mind" "Marira Kesshinsuru" (Japanese: マリラ・決心する)	Isao Takahata	Seijirō Kōyama	February 4, 1979
Mrs. Spencer denies knowing the Cuthberts asked for a boy instead of a girl. While at the Spencers', a strict neighbor called Mrs Blewett visits and offers to take Anne.
6	"Anne of Green Gables" "Gurīn Geiburuzu no An" (Japanese: グリーン・ゲイブルズのアン)	Isao Takahata	Isao Takahata; Aiko Isomura	February 11, 1979
Matthew and Marilla decide to keep Anne at Green Gables. Anne goes for a walk, but comes back late. Marilla tells Anne about a possible best friend for her.
7	"Mrs. Rachel Lynde Is Properly Horrified" "Reicheru Fujin Osore o Nasu" (Japanese: レイチェル夫人恐れをなす)	Isao Takahata	Seijirō Kōyama	February 18, 1979
When Mrs. Lynde rudely speaks her mind on Anne's appearance, Anne gets so offended that she tells her off. Anne must learn to apologize for what she did even though Mrs. Lynde was not right.
8	"Anne's Impressions of Sunday School" "An Nichiyō Gakkō e Iku" (Japanese: アン・日曜学校へ行く)	Isao Takahata	Isao Takahata; Seijirō Kōyama	February 25, 1979
Anne is disappointed that her new Sunday clothes (made by Marilla) are so plain, so along the way to church she dresses up her hat with wildflowers. Afterward she talks about what she thinks of Sunday School.
9	"A Solemn Vow" "Ogosokana Chikai" (Japanese: おごそかな誓い)	Isao Takahata	Seijirō Kōyama	March 4, 1979
Anne and Diana meet and vow to be good best friends.
10	"Anne Plays with a Best Friend" "An Kokoro no Tomoto Asobu" (Japanese: アン・心の友と遊ぶ)	Isao Takahata	Isao Takahata; Seijirō Kōyama	March 11, 1979
Anne and Diana play together.
11	"Anne Loses Marilla's Brooch" "Marira Burōchi o Nakusu" (Japanese: マリラ・ブローチをなくす)	Isao Takahata	Seijirō Kōyama	March 18, 1979
Marilla's brooch that Anne was admiring goes missing, and Anne, who denies having anything to do with it, is punished and grounded until she confesses.
12	"Anne's Confession" "An Kokuhakusuru" (Japanese: アン・告白する)	Isao Takahata	Isao Takahata; Seijirō Kōyama	March 25, 1979
Marilla still thinks Anne is not telling her the truth, so she will not let her attend the picnic as punishment and grounded for hiding her brooch. The girl finally comes up with a confession to end her punishment.
13	"Anne Goes to School" "An Gakkō e Iku" (Japanese: アン・学校へ行く)	Isao Takahata	Isao Takahata; Seijirō Kōyama	April 1, 1979
Anne has her first day of school, and while she dislikes the teacher, has fun.
14	"A Tempest in Class" "Kyōshitsu Sōdō" (Japanese: 教室騒動)	Isao Takahata	Kaizō Kamiyama	April 8, 1979
The flirtatious and bold prankster Gilbert Blythe returns to town, but he goes too far when he jokingly calls Anne "Carrots", and she responds by breaking her slate over his head. When Mr. Phillips makes the two sit together, Anne quits school.
15	"Fall Is Coming" "Aki no Otozure" (Japanese: 秋の訪れ)	Isao Takahata	Seijirō Kōyama	April 15, 1979
Marilla teaches Anne how to make a cake, and Anne has a run-in with Gilbert Blythe.
16	"Diana Is Invited to Tea" "Daiana o Ocha ni Maneku" (Japanese: ダイアナをお茶に招く)	Isao Takahata	Takekuni Takano	April 22, 1979
Anne and Diana have a tea party, but Diana starts acting strangely after drinking a few glasses of raspberry cordial and this causes her mother to send her into her room and forbid to play with Anne as punishment for drinking of raspberry cordial. It turns out they actually got drunk from Marilla's red currant wine and mixed them up.
17	"Anne Returns to School" "An Gakkō e Modoru" (Japanese: アン・学校へもどる)	Isao Takahata	Isao Takahata; Seijirō Kōyama	May 6, 1979
After Diana is forbidden to play with Anne and her punishment by her mother, Anne decides to return to school.
18	"Anne Rescues Minnie May" "An, Minii Mei o Sukū" (Japanese: アン、ミニイ・メイを救う)	Isao Takahata	Isao Takahata; Seijirō Kōyama	May 13, 1979
Minnie May falls seriously ill while she and Diana are being babysat, and Anne is the only one who may know what to do.
19	"Diana's Birthday" "Daiana no Tanjōbi" (Japanese: ダイアナの誕生日)	Isao Takahata	Takekuni Takano	May 20, 1979
Anne has been invited to go to a concert and sleepover for Diana's birthday, but things go wrong for Diana when the girls get too boisterous during the sleepover.
20	"Spring Once Again" "Futatabi Haru ga Kite" (Japanese: 再び春が来て)	Isao Takahata	Isao Takahata; Takekuni Takano	May 27, 1979
Anne enjoys the spring atmosphere and takes over the chores when Marilla gets a headache.
21	"The New Minister's Wife" "Atarashii Bokushi Fusai" (Japanese: 新しい牧師夫妻)	Isao Takahata	Shigeki Chiba	June 3, 1979
Mr. Phillips leaves the school, and Anne meets the new minister and his wife.
22	"The Wrong Ingredient" "Kōryō Chigai" (Japanese: 香料ちがい)	Isao Takahata; Kazuyoshi Yokota	Shigeki Chiba	June 10, 1979
Anne catches a cold, and because she loses her sense of taste, mistakenly uses the wrong ingredient in a cake for Mrs. Allen.
23	"Anne Is Invited to Tea" "An Ocha ni Yobareru" (Japanese: アン・お茶によばれる)	Isao Takahata	Isao Takahata; Shigeki Chiba	June 17, 1979
Anne is invited to tea with the new minister and his wife.
24	"An Affair of Honour" "Menboku o Kaketa Daijiken" (Japanese: 面目をかけた大事件)	Isao Takahata	Shigeki Chiba	June 24, 1979
The "dare game" has taken on popularity with the girls of Avonlea, but to protect her pride from Josie Pye, Anne takes on an extremely dangerous dare: walk the ridgepole of the Barry's house.
25	"A Letter to Diana" "Daiana e no Tegami" (Japanese: ダイアナへの手紙)	Isao Takahata; Kazuyoshi Yokota	Isao Takahata; Takekuni Takano	July 1, 1979
When Diana takes ill in another town, Anne thinks back and realizes she has not been as good a friend as she should have.
26	"The Concert Plan" "Konsāto no Keikaku" (Japanese: コンサートの計画)	Isao Takahata	Isao Takahata; Shigeki Chiba	July 8, 1979
Anne returns to school. The new teacher is wonderful and fair and plans to have a concert to raise money to have a school flag made.
27	"Matthew and the Clothes Shop" "Mashū to Fukuranda Neko" (Japanese: マシュウとふくらんだ袖)	Isao Takahata	Isao Takahata; Takekuni Takano	July 15, 1979
Matthew, unlike Marilla, sees no problem with Anne having a nice dress with puffed sleeves like the other girls. He sets out to get one for her for Christmas, but his well-intentioned plan goes awry when the clerk at the store is female.
28	"The Christmas Concert" "Kurisumasu no Konsāto" (Japanese: クリスマスのコンサート)	Isao Takahata	Isao Takahata; Takekuni Takano	July 22, 1979
Anne receives her Christmas presents, and the eve of the concert arrives.
29	"Anne Starts the Story-telling Club" "An Monogatari-Kurabu o Tsukuru" (Japanese: アン・物語クラブを作る)	Isao Takahata; Kazuyoshi Yokota	Isao Takahata; Kazuyoshi Yokota	July 29, 1979
Anne finds it hard to settle back into mundane life after the concert, so she starts a creative writing club.
30	"Vanity and Heartache" "Kyoei to Shintsū" (Japanese: 虚栄と心痛)	Isao Takahata	Isao Takahata; Takekuni Takano	August 5, 1979
Anne buys black hair dye from a peddler, but she does not get the raven black hair she had hoped for.
31	"An Unfortunate Lily Maid" "Fūn na Shirayurihime" (Japanese: 不運な白百合姫)	Isao Takahata	Isao Takahata; Yoshihisa Araki	August 12, 1979
Anne and her friends act out the Lady of Shalott, but Anne soon finds herself in trouble, and her friends run to get Diana's parents.
32	"An Epoch in Anne's Life" "Shoogai no Ichidaiji" (Japanese: 生涯の一大事)	Isao Takahata	Isao Takahata; Shigeki Chiba	August 19, 1979
Anne and Diana are invited to Charlottetown by Aunt Josephine. Anne realizes that while city life and fancy things are a lot of fun once in a while, she prefers her country life and leaving things to the imagination.
33	"An Invitation to Queen's Class" "Kuiin-Gumi no Yobikake" (Japanese: クィーン組の呼びかけ)	Isao Takahata; Kazuyoshi Yokota	Isao Takahata; Shigeki Chiba	August 26, 1979
Anne and Diana quarrel about the future, primarily about marriage. Anne, looking for Matthew for comfort, eats a few apples from a barrel; Jerry claimed the apples were poisoned, a bad joke on his part. Later, Anne hears about the news for Queen's Class that begins the preparation required for the entrance exam. With Matthew's and Marilla's approval, Anne sets her sights towards the future where she dreams of becoming a teacher.
34	"Diana and the Students at Queens" "Daiana to Kuīn-Gumi no Nakama" (Japanese: ダイアナとクィーン組の仲間)	Isao Takahata	Isao Takahata; Shigeki Chiba	September 9, 1979
Anne learns what Diana wants to do in the future. After hearing what Marilla has to say, Anne realizes the importance of hearing other people's opinions and accepts Diana's decision as the two make a vow once again. At school during the extra class, Anne feels left out by Gilbert's circle, and when a heavy snowstorm hits the school, Anne cannot help but think pleasantly of Gilbert as he handles the situation well and brings the necessary help to evacuate everyone from the school.
35	"Longing for the Summer Holidays" "Natsuyasumi Mae no Omowaku" (Japanese: 夏休み前の思わく)	Isao Takahata	Isao Takahata; Yoshihisa Araki	September 16, 1979
For the holidays, Anne decides to spend her entire break having fun as she is tired of studying. Without realizing it herself, studying has taken its toll on Anne. The reason for why Matthew and Marilla wanted to adopt a boy is revealed.
36	"The Future of the Story Club" "Monogatari-Kurabu no Yukue" (Japanese: 物語クラブのゆくえ)	Isao Takahata; Kazuyoshi Yokota	Isao Takahata; Takekuni Takano	September 23, 1979
Aftering visiting Idlewild once again and seeing its current condition, Anne and Diana are filled with bittersweet memories. Throughout the episode, Anne cannot help but realize how things have started to change as she gets older; from the Story Club to Marilla wearing glasses, many things have already changed.
37	"A 15-Year-Old's Spring" "Jūgo-sai no Haru" (Japanese: 十五歳の春)	Isao Takahata	Kōzō Kusuba; Takekuni Takano	September 30, 1979
Marilla constantly thinks back to the old times when Anne would talk. With the arrival of the new train station at Carmody, Aunt Josephine visits Green Gables and offers to let Anne stay with her when Anne is in Charlottetown.
38	"My Number Is 13" "Jukenbangō wa Jūsan-ban" (Japanese: 受験番号は13番)	Isao Takahata	Isao Takahata; Shigeki Chiba	October 7, 1979
It is time to attend the Entrance exams in Charlottetown, and all the Avonlea students are anxious to pass, but Anne feels a twinge of worry when she finds out her number is thirteen.
39	"The Results" "Gōkakuhappyō" (Japanese: 合格発表)	Isao Takahata	Isao Takahata; Shigeki Chiba	October 14, 1979
Anne, Jane, Gilbert and everyone else wait restlessly for the exam results. Seeing how tense Anne is, Marilla lets her help Matthew out which puts her at ease. The results come, and Diana runs up the hill to Green Gables.
40	"The Concert Hotel" "Hoteru no Konsāto" (Japanese: ホテルのコンサート)	Isao Takahata; Kazuyoshi Yokota	Isao Takahata; Yoshihisa Araki	October 21, 1979
Anne is invited to recite at a concert to help earn funds to give to a hospital in Charlottetown.
41	"Off to Queen's College" "Kuīn Gakuin e no Tabidachi" (Japanese: クィーン学院への旅立ち)	Isao Takahata; Kōzō Kusuba	Isao Takahata; Yoshihisa Araki	October 28, 1979
Mrs. Spencer comes to Green Gables with a new adoption offer made by an American couple, but Anne listens to it as if she were hearing a story. Marilla decides to get a gown made for Anne. Thoughts fill the house as the bittersweet moment finally approaches for Anne to go to Queen's.
42	"Life on a New Campus" "Atarashii Gakuenseikatsu" (Japanese: 新しい学園生活)	Isao Takahata; Kenichi Baba	Isao Takahata; Yoshihisa Araki	November 4, 1979
A wave of sadness hits Marilla, Matthew and Anne as they face the first night of a new lifestyle. Anne, initially saddened, is visited by Jane, Josie and Ruby in her room where they mention a scholarship to a university. The idea helps fire Anne's ambition: she aims to get the scholarship and earn a Bachelor of Literature.
43	"Home for the Weekends" "Shūmatsu no Kyūka" (Japanese: 週末の休暇)	Isao Takahata; Shigeo Koshi	Isao Takahata; Seijirō Kōyama	November 11, 1979
Anne is unable to tell Marilla and Matthew of her future plans for further studies. At Green Gables and throughout the Avonlea area, Anne spends some quality time with the two of them.
44	"The Winter at Queen's" "Kuīn Gakuin no Fuyu" (Japanese: クィーン学院の冬)	Isao Takahata; Kazuyoshi Yokota	Isao Takahata; Seijirō Kōyama	November 18, 1979
Hearing Matthew's condition from Miss Barry, Anne immediately departs for Green Gables and walks through a snowstorm. After a warming visit at Green Gables, Anne returns to Queen's with an even stronger passion to succeed in her own way by balancing her love of the countryside and her studies.
45	"The Glory and the Dream" "Eikō to Yume" (Japanese: 栄光と夢)	Isao Takahata; Kōzō Kusuba	Shigeki Chiba; Nanako Shiraishi	November 25, 1979
Anne is afraid of seeing the results, and is in a moment of despair when everyone is cheering for Gilbert. Then she hears cheering starting for her. She starts to cry, but is then overwhelmed by happiness at winning the scholarship, while Gil wins the medal; both are awarded at the graduation ceremony. Anne eagerly heads home with Marilla and Matthew to where Diana awaits at Green Gables. Diana tells Anne how Gilbert will not be heading into university right after Queen's but instead will have to work to be able to afford his tuition.
46	"Matthew's Love" "Mashū no Ai" (Japanese: マシュウの愛)	Isao Takahata; Kenichi Baba	Shigeki Chiba; Nanako Shiraishi	December 2, 1979
Anne is stuck between a rock and a hard place while thinking of her future: should she stay at Green Gables and help out, seeing how old Matthew and Marilla have gotten, or should she continue her education. Matthew's condition makes Anne especially worried and she wishes she'd been born a boy so she could help out. Matthew assures her, however, that even a dozen boys would not compare to Anne, and for the first time Matthew calls Anne his daughter.
47	"The Reaper Whose Name Is Death" "Shi to Yobareru Kariirebito" (Japanese: 死と呼ばれる刈入れ人)	Isao Takahata; Shigeo Koshi	Isao Takahata; Yoshihisa Araki	December 9, 1979
The sudden news of Abbey's Bank going bankrupt is a huge shock to Matthew's already fragile heart, and it kills him instantly. Marilla is seen performing present-day CPR on Matthew, but to no avail. Everyone in Avonlea goes to Green Gables to mourn, but Anne is the only one unable to cry. The two who cared for Matthew the most seek comfort from each other, as no other person had loved Matthew as profoundly as they did. While crying together, Marilla tells Anne how happy she has been since Anne came to Green Gables, and how it would have been intolerable if she would have had to go through this alone.
48	"Matthew's Farewell" "Mashū Wagaya o Saru" (Japanese: マシュウ我が家を去る)	Isao Takahata; Kazuyoshi Yokota	Isao Takahata; Yoshihisa Araki	December 16, 1979
The funeral ends with Matthew's burial. Anne plants Matthew's favourite flowers right beside his tombstone. As life moves on, Anne feels guilty that she can still have fun and laugh despite Matthew's death; this holds her back but she learns to accept it. Marilla talks about Gilbert, how his looks remind her of his father, John, who had once been in love with Marilla. Marilla tells Anne how this situation was similar to Anne's and Gilbert's: after a quarrel, Marilla was unable to forgive John, and this broke the two lovers apart. John never came back.
49	"The Bend in the Road" "Magarikado" (Japanese: 曲り角)	Isao Takahata; Kōzō Kusuba	Isao Takahata; Yoshihisa Araki	December 23, 1979
Marilla learns the fate of her eyes from the eye specialist and now has to change her lifestyle entirely to help ease the strain on her eyes. Anne, seeing Marilla's situation, changes her dream and turns the current predicament into something pleasant. When Marilla mentions her intention to sell Green Gables, as she can no longer maintain it and cannot handle living alone, Anne takes this chance to tell Marilla how she will no longer be going to university, but instead will teach and stay close to Marilla as much as possible. Nothing else, Anne says, matters as much to her as being able to stay by Marilla's side in her time of need.
50	"All Is Well on Earth" "Kami wa Ten ni Imashi, Subete Yo wa Koto mo Nashi" (Japanese: 神は天にいまし すべて世は事もなし)	Isao Takahata; Kenichi Baba	Isao Takahata; Yoshihisa Araki	December 30, 1979
News of Anne no longer going to university spreads while Anne gets used to a new life where she helps Marilla out a lot. Ms. Lynde tells Anne about Gilbert's withdrawal from teaching in Avonlea (where he recommended that Anne be the teacher) in favor of teaching at a different school. Anne meets Gilbert on the road, and after they talk and understand each other a little more, they finally become friends. In letters to Stella and Miss Stacy, Anne writes "no matter how narrow my road is, I can still find flowers blooming".
