= Anne of Green Gables (1979 TV series) =

Japanese anime television series

- Title card
- 赤毛のアン
- Genre: Drama, historical, slice of life
- Based on: Anne of Green Gables by Lucy Maud Montgomery
- Directed by: Isao Takahata
- Music by: Kurōdo Mōri
- Country of origin: Japan
- Original language: Japanese
- No. of episodes: 50

Production
- Executive producer: Kōichi Motohashi
- Producers: Junzo Nakajima; Shigeo Endo
- Production companies: Nippon Animation; Fuji Television

Original release
- Network: FNS (Fuji TV)
- Release: January 7 – December 30, 1979

Related
- Anime film

Anne of Green Gables: Road to Green Gables
- Directed by: Isao Takahata
- Written by: Isao Takahata
- Music by: Akira Miyoshi; Kurōdo Mōri
- Studio: Nippon Animation
- Licensed by: AUS: Madman Entertainment
- Released: July 17, 2010
- Runtime: 100 minutes

Anne of Green Gables (Japanese: 赤毛のアン, Hepburn: Akage no An; lit. 'Red-haired Anne') is a Japanese animated television series and the fifth entry in Nippon Animation's World Masterpiece Theater franchise. It was adapted from the 1908 novel Anne of Green Gables by Lucy Maud Montgomery. The series was first broadcast on Fuji Television and its affiliates from January 7 to December 30, 1979. Fifty episodes were produced in total. The first six episodes were later edited into a compilation film released in 2010.

As with the novels, the animated version of Anne is beloved in Japan to this day. An anime series that serves as a prequel to the series, Kon'nichiwa Anne: Before Green Gables, premiered on April 5, 2009, in Japan.

== Plot ==
Anne Shirley is a 11-year-old girl raised in an orphanage. Anne is accidentally sent to Miss Marilla Cuthbert and Mr. Matthew Cuthbert, who had originally requested a boy. Miss Marilla is surprised at first. After Marilla learns of Anne's sad past, Anne gradually becomes an irreplaceable member of the Cuthbert family.

== Cast and characters ==
Anne Shirley as she appears in the series

Character	Japanese	English
Anne Shirley (アン・シャーリー, An Shārī)	Eiko Yamada	Belinda Richardson Fraser
Marilla Cuthbert (マリラ・カスバート, Marira Kasubāto)	Fumie Kitahara	Diane Appleby
Matthew Cuthbert (マシュウ・カスバート, Mashū Kasubāto)	Ryūji Saikachi	Ron Smerczak
Diana Barry (ダイアナ・バリー, Daiana Barī)	Gara Takashima	
Gilbert Blythe (ギルバート・ブライス, Girubāto Buraisu)	Kazuhiko Inoue	
Mrs. Rachel Lynde (レイチェル・リンド夫人, Reicheru Rindo fujin)	Miyoko Asō	
Mrs. Alexandra Spencer (アレキサンダー・スペンサー夫人, Arekisandā Supensā fujin)	Akiko Tsuboi	
Mrs. Barry (バリー夫人, Barī fujin)	Reiko Mutō	
Minnie May Barry (ミニー・メイ・バリー, Minī Mei Barī)	Mami Koyama	
Ruby Gillis (ルビー・ギリス, Rubī Girisu)	Mami Koyama Makoto Kōsaka (from ep. 34)	
Mr. Teddy Phillips (テディ・フィリップス先生, Tedi Firippusu sensei)	Motomu Kiyokawa	
Josie Pye (ジョーシー・パイ, Jōshī Pai)	Junko Hori	
Josephine Barry (ジョセフィン・バリー, Josefin Barī)	Natsuko Kawaji	
Jane Andrews (ジェーン・アンドリュース, Jēn Andoryūsu)	Sanae Takagi	
Reverend Allan (アラン牧師, Aran bokushi)	Kazuyuki Sogabe	
Mrs. Allan (アラン夫人, Aran fujin)	Yoko Egawa	
Miss Muriel Stacy (ミュウリエル・ステイシー先生, Myuurieru Suteishī sensei)	Hiroko Suzuki	
Mr. Barry (バリー氏, Barī-shi)	Eisuke Yoda	
Narrator	Michio Hazama	James White

== Production ==
The anime was directed by Isao Takahata. He chose to hold this version true to the original source material, although his two previous works (Heidi, Girl of the Alps and 3000 Leagues in Search of Mother) had been adapted and altered.

Montgomery's novel was already extremely popular in Japan at the time of production, having been first introduced to Japanese readers in 1952 through Hanako Muraoka's translation. However, the screenwriters decided to use Taeko Kamiyama's 1973 translation, as it was considered more faithful to the original text.

By the late 1970s, Anne of Green Gables was widely seen in Japan as a "girls' book," a perception shared by Isao Takahata when first approached to adapt it. Initially uninterested and doubtful about its suitability for animation due to its dialogue-heavy and uneventful nature, Takahata reluctantly accepted the project, partly due to internal studio politics. However, as he delved deeper into the novel, he grew to appreciate its subtlety and found it an engaging creative challenge. This contrasted with other staff members—like Masahiro Ioka and Yoshifumi Kondō—who were already fans of the book.

In July 1978, Isao Takahata, Yoshifumi Kondō, and the production team traveled to Prince Edward Island, Canada, to conduct research for Anne of Green Gables. They visited key locations like the Green Gables house and Orwell Corner Historic Village, taking photos, sketches, and notes to capture the landscape, architecture, and atmosphere of the late 19th century. Soil samples were even brought back to Japan to ensure accurate color reproduction. This trip provided essential visual reference material, contributing significantly to the historical authenticity of the anime.

Hayao Miyazaki did the scene setting and layout. Previously, he had worked on 3000 Leagues in Search of Mother, although he left the production and Nippon Animation after the first 15 episodes. Miyazaki noticed a difference in Takahata's philosophy of animation; Takahata stuck to controlled, realistic acting at the time, similar to his former work. Miyazaki had not intended to do other work with Takahata, but he had also not planned on becoming independent at this stage of his career.

Miyazaki, who was also unfamiliar with the novel and unimpressed by it, contributed to the adaptation in its early episodes but remained detached from the story's tone and themes. Takahata aimed to stay true to the novel's realistic and everyday-life tone, focusing on sober direction and delicate animation. Miyazaki, on the other hand, favored a highly expressive and dynamic animation style, as seen in Future Boy Conan, which led to clashes between his layouts and Takahata's storyboards. Moreover, Anne's character—unidealized in appearance, impulsive in personality, and lacking a male point of view—contrasted sharply with the idealized, "protective" image of girls that Miyazaki was beginning to shape in his works. Anne thus stood in opposition not only to characters like Fiorina and Heidi, but also to Miyazaki's own emerging vision of female protagonists. After Miyazaki's departure, the production rapidly declined, with the following episodes marked by more static animation and the use of still frames, and the reduction of the series from 52 to 50 episodes due to delays.

Yoshifumi Kondō was selected for character design and animation director over Yoichi Kotabe, who had stopped work with Takahata after 3000 Leagues in Search of Mother of the previous work. Kondo went on to work with Takahata on the films Grave of the Fireflies and Only Yesterday. After the Canada trip, Kondō and Takahata began designing Anne. Kondō initial shōjo-style drawings, based on the first 1952 translation of the novel, were rejected by Takahata, who preferred a more realistic look based on the 1973 translation and inspired by Mia Farrow's performance in Peyton Place. Anne's design was gradually refined to appear less stylized and to show her beauty developing naturally over time.

The voice of Anne was provided by Eiko Yamada, who would become a staple of World Masterpiece Theater anime, going on to play Lavinia in Princess Sara and Jo March in Tales of Little Women (the latter of which also featured character designs by Kondo). In her very first anime role, Yamada was personally chosen by Takahata to voice Anne, finding that her high-pitched, inexperienced delivery perfectly matched Anne's expressive and impulsive personality, despite other staff members—such as Miyazaki—preferring a cuter voice. Other notable cast members included Gara Takashima as Diana, in her first major role, and veteran Ryūji Saikachi as Matthew. Fumie Kitahara, voicing Marilla, had prior dubbing experience but no anime background. Unlike the tense atmosphere among animators, the recording sessions were positive, thanks to the support of recording director Yasuo Urakami and Saikachi, who helped guide Yamada's performance.

== Music ==
- Opening theme: "Kikoeru Kashira (I wonder if you can hear it)", lyrics written by Eriko Kishida, composed by Akira Miyoshi, sung by Ritsuko Ohwada
- Ending theme: "Samenai Yume", lyrics written by Eriko Kishida, composed by Akira Miyoshi, sung by Ritsuko Ohwada

== International broadcast ==
=== Italian version ===
In Italy, the anime was distributed by Doro TV Merchandising and broadcast on public television network Rai 1 starting on October 20, 1980. The dub was produced by Rome-based company Studioimmagine, with Anne voiced by 14-year-old actress Antonella Baldini. The series was imported before the novel had been published in Italian, so the title used was a direct translation of the Japanese one: Anna dai capelli rossi ("Red-haired Anna"). During the airing of the series, Montgomery's novel was published in Italy under the more faithful title Anna di Green Gables, but the anime became so popular that Anna dai capelli rossi became the most commonly used title in subsequent Italian editions. Since then, the series has been rebroadcast numerous times in Italy, where it is regarded as a classic of animation similarly to Heidi. The Italian opening theme also became a hit, and was the subject of discussion due to its resemblance to the Boney M. version of Rivers of Babylon.

=== German version ===
In Germany, the series was distributed by Apollo Films and broadcast by Sat.1 starting on October 6, 1988. The German dialogue was written and directed by Andreas Wagner, with Inez Günther voicing Anne. The anime became a classic in Germany, achieving a status comparable to that of Heidi and Pinocchio.

=== English version ===
An English dub was produced in South Africa by the European licensor, Apollo Films. It was recorded at the Johannesburg-based Leephy Studios, and it was derived from the German version. The dub aired on SABC in the early 90s, and also on Jet TV in Asia, in 1998.

== Related media ==
=== Film ===
The first six episodes were edited together by Takahata into a 100-minute theatrical film in 1989. A theatrical release was scheduled, but it received instead a limited release in selected cities between July and August 1990. A VHS of the film was also released in 1992. It was released by the Ghibli Museum as Anne of Green Gables: Road to Green Gables (赤毛のアン グリーンゲーブルズへの道, Akage no An: Green Gables e no Michi; lit. 'Red-haired Anne: Road to Green Gables') on July 17, 2010.

=== Prequel ===
An adaptation of Budge Wilson's 2008 prequel novel Before Green Gables, Kon'nichiwa Anne: Before Green Gables, premiered on April 5, 2009, on Fuji TV.

== Home video releases ==
Both the theatrical release and the entire original series are available on DVD Blu-ray. The "DVD Memorial BOX set" for Region 2 was released on August 22, 2008, and a Blu-Ray of the series was released in Japan on March 26, 2014.

== Reception ==
The show was well received upon its Japanese debut, helping lift the profile of the source material. It has subsequently appeared on best-anime lists conducted by TV Asahi's audience polls and those produced by outlets like Animage.

Shigeto Mori has received two posthumous JASRAC International Awards for his work on the series, first in 2003 and then in 2010.

== See also ==
- Anne Shirley (2025 TV series)
