= Metaphor (disambiguation) =

A metaphor is an analogy between two objects or ideas, conveyed by using a word instead of another word.

Metaphor may also refer to:

- Conceptual metaphor, metaphors in cognitive linguistics, understanding one idea or conceptual domain in terms of another
- Interface metaphor, metaphors in computer science, for example an icon of a filing cabinet for "filestore"
- Metaphor: ReFantazio, 2024 video game
- Metaphor: The Tree of Utah, a sculpture
- "Metaphor", a song by In Flames from their album Reroute to Remain
- "Metaphors", a poem by Sylvia Plath
- "The Metaphor", a short story by Budge Wilson
- Metaphor (designers), a London-based design firm founded in 2000
- Metaphor Computer Systems, producer of an advanced combined hardware/software offering
