= Tico and Friends =

Japanese anime television series

- Cover art from Bandai Visual's DVD release of the re-edited footage film of the series
- 七つの海のティコ
- Created by: Akira Hiroo
- Directed by: Jun Takagi
- Music by: Michiru Ōshima
- Opening theme: "Sea loves you" by Mayumi Shinozuka
- Ending theme: "Twinkle Talk" by Mayumi Shinozuka
- Country of origin: Japan
- Original language: Japanese
- No. of episodes: 39

Production
- Executive producer: Kōichi Motohashi
- Producers: Yoshihiro Suzuki (Fuji TV); Akio Yogo
- Running time: 25 minutes
- Production companies: Fuji Television; Nippon Animation

Original release
- Network: FNS (Fuji TV)
- Release: January 16 – December 18, 1994

Tico and Friends (Japanese: 七つの海のティコ, Hepburn: Nanatsu no Umi no Tiko), also known as Tico of the Seven Seas, is a Japanese original anime television series produced by Nippon Animation that aired on Fuji Television and its affiliates from January to December 1994 as the 20th entry in the World Masterpiece Theater series, made in commemoration of the series' 20th anniversary as well as Nippon Animation's 20th anniversary. The story follows the adventures of an 11-year-old girl named Nanami Simpson as she travels the world with her father and her best friend Tico, a female orca.

Unlike other entries in the series, Tico of the Seven Seas is an entirely original story. A novelization of the series, written by Akira Hiroo, the author of the original concept, was eventually published in 3 volumes by Kadokawa Sneaker Bunko in conjunction with the broadcast.

An English dub of the series, entitled Tico & Friends, was produced by Ocean Studios in 1999. The dubbed series omits major character deaths and also edits out some violent, bloody and death scenes; one episode from the original version, which focuses on the aftermath of a major character death, is even omitted completely and replaced with a makeshift clip show episode (although some scenes from the omitted episode are included in the replacement).

== Plot ==
Nanami Simpson is a young Japanese-American girl. Having lost her mother when she was young, she now lives with her marine biologist father, Scott Simpson, on board his research vessel, the Peperonchino. Scott has been in search of a creature known as the Luminous Whale, a whale that can glow brightly underwater, for many years and is determined to eventually see it and preserve its existence. Nanami also is close friends with an orca named Tico, who was rescued as a baby just before Nanami was born. The two have an unbreakable bond and swim with each other every day. As a result, Nanami gradually learns to hold her breath longer and swim deeper than other humans can.

Scott's search from the Luminous Whale soon puts him at odds with the Gaiatron Corporation, a greedy research conglomerate led by the ruthless and ambitious Adrienne Benex, who wishes to exploit the creature for a rare element it seemingly carries in its body. Aiding Benex are her right-hand man, Gaulois, and Dr. Charles LeConte, an old acquaintance of Scott's who is obsessed with the Luminous Whale.

Together, Nanami, Scott, and Tico, along with Scott's first-mate and right-hand man, Al Andretti, seek to locate the Luminous Whale before Benex and Gaiatron can. Over time, they are joined by a few new crew members:

- Cheryl Melville, an English-American heiress looking for adventure.
- James McIntyre, Cheryl's loyal butler.
- Thomas LeConte, Dr. LeConte's introverted and lonely, but intelligent son, who wishes to prove himself capable in the real world.
- Junior, Tico's calf, born nearly halfway through the series.

As their journey goes on, the crew of Peperonchino encounter and make both new friends and enemies, and form bonds with each other, as they race against the corrupt Benex and Gaiatron to find the Luminous Whale first.

== Characters ==
=== Main ===
Nanami Simpson
Voiced by Megumi Hayashibara; Chantal Strand in the English dub
Nanami is the main protagonist in the series. At 11 years old, she claims all creatures from the sea are her friends. She has been friends with Tico ever since she was a baby, and has a close relationship with her father Scott, and friendships with all of their crew members throughout the series.
Tico
A killer whale who is a life-long friend to Nanami. In the Japanese version, she dies freeing Al's submersible from an iceberg crevice, which mortally injures her, and her body sinks to the depths of the sea, while Nanami looks on helplessly. In the last episode, "The Shining Circle" her spirit reunites with Nanami and her son via the Luminous Whale. In the English dub, she is still injured, but survives and the crew is forced to leave her behind to let her recover. She returns a few episodes later, shortly after her son Junior leaves the crew to join a super-pod of killer whales. In the final episode, the spirit that Tico reunites with turns out to be her own long-lost mother.
Junior
Junior is Tico's calf. In the Japanese original series, he takes Tico's place as Nanami's companion, along with her name, after the former sacrifices herself to save Al. He meets his mother again the series finale, "The Shining Circle". In the English dub, his mother survives, and is left behind to recover, returning not long after he leaves to join a super-pod of killer whales.
Scott Simpson
Voiced by Shuuichi Ikeda; David Kaye in the English dub
Nanami's father, who is a marine biologist, and captain of the Peperoncino. He has been searching for the Luminous Whale for seven years. He is a dedicated father to his daughter and is often the level-headed one for his crew. Scott is also protective of his research of the Luminous Whale, refusing to let it or the creature itself fall into the wrong hands.
Alfonso "Al" Andretti
A fat Italian man who works with Scott, and always on the lookout for treasure. He is the chef and engineer of Peperoncino and often comes up with get-rich quick schemes in order to make the crew money. He serves as something of an uncle and mentor to Nanami and later to Thomas as well. A scene where he punches Professor LeConte in the stomach is removed.
Cheryl Christina Melville
Voiced by Venus Terzo in the English dub
An English-American woman who comes from a wealthy family and craves adventure. She initially has a frosty relationship with the crew, particularly Nanami and Al (due to her joining the crew on a whim, and her initial reluctance to do any actual work), but they all soon warm up to her, and she ends up becoming a valued member and even something of a big sister to Nanami and Thomas. Due to her wealth, she often serves as the source for emergency funds when the crew needs them. Initially, she relies on her butler James to do the crew work for her, but later starts contributing by herself following his brief departure from the crew in the seventh episode, and becomes more independent as a result.
James McIntyre
Voiced by David Kaye in the English dub
Cheryl's loyal butler. Born near the Cliffs of Dover, he has served the Melville family faithfully for many years, and is charged with looking after Cheryl while she attends college in New York. James joins the crew of the Peperoncino at the same time as Cheryl, but leaves in the seventh episode and joins the crew of the Gaiatron ship Scorpio, after switching places with Thomas LeConte. He returns to the Peperoncino ten episodes later, and remains with the crew up to the series finale.
Thomas LeConte
An 11-year-old boy the Peperoncino crew met in the Bahamas and the son of scientist Dr. Charles LeConte. Intelligent and computer-savvy, but also introverted, lonely, and somewhat cautious, he craves attention from his father, but is often pushed aside and neglected due to Dr. LeConte's research regarding the Luminous Whale. In his first appearance in the second episode, he cons Nanami and Al in helping him return to his ship in return for a treasure map that turns out to be fake. Several episodes later, the crew meets him again on his father's ship, and after being rescued after getting trapped underwater in the Peperoncino's mini-sub, he decides to join their crew to go out into the world and become more extroverted, becoming Al's unofficial apprentice and Nanami's closest human friend. By the end of the series, he manages to patch things up with his father.

=== Other characters ===
Nagisa Suzuki
Nanami's aunt from her mother, Yuko's side of the family.
Gayle
A con-man with a heart of gold, and a crush on Cheryl. He also has a fear of fish.
Richard
A free-lance photographer who informs the Peperoncino crew about Metal Claw's activities.
Lolo
Richard's pet parrot.
Metal Claw
Voiced by Daisuke Gouri; Scott McNeil in the English dub
A villain from the earlier part in the series, he is a man who has a metal hand in place of his right hand. He is a captain of the Mentil.
Professor Charles LeConte
A scientist who is an old acquaintance of Scott Simpson, and Thomas's father. Obsessed with the Luminous Whale, LeConte's determination to find it causes him to ally himself with the corrupt Gaiatron Corporation, and neglect his son. By the end of the series, however, he learns the error of his ways and reconciles with Thomas. A scene where he slaps his son is edited out in the English Dub.
Stephen
A member of the crew on the Scorpio.
Topia
Voiced by Akiko Yajima
Enrico Andretti
Voiced by Bin Shimada
A cousin of Al's, who lives with their grandmother.
Don Gould (Mr. Krang in the English dub)
Head of the Rio Connection.
Rozalint Andretti
Voiced by Hisako Kyōda; Kathleen Barr in the English dub
Al's 94-year-old grandmother who lives in Italy.
Adrienne Benex
Voiced by Chiyoko Kawashima
The main villain of the series. Professor LeConte's superior, she owns the Gaiatron Corporation. She wants the luminous whale due to an element it is said to have, called trontium. In the Japanese series, she is killed when seagulls attack and incapacitate the pilots of her escape helicopter, causing it to crash into her Antarctic Base, The Iron City, with her in it. The seagulls were summoned, along with other animals, by the luminous whale to attack the base. This is edited out in the English dub.
Gaulois
Voiced by Keisuke Yamashita
Benex's underling.
Terry Taft
Voiced by Yumi Tōma
A boy Nanami meets who uses a wheelchair. He lost the use of his legs at the same time he lost his sister, Maggie.
Opiac
A young girl of the north Arctic whose grandfather is a descendant of one of has seen the luminous whale.
Luminous whale
A whale whose body glows yellow. It is semi-supernatural, as it summoned animals to attack the iron city base, showed Nanami her future, and brought the Ghost of Tico for a final Goodbye to her friend and Son. It can still die though, as evidence by its fossils being found by Scott Simpson, and it almost drying up when hoisted out of the Ocean by Adrienne Bennex's men.

== Episodes ==
1. Nanami, A Little Adventurer (The Girl With the Killer Whale! Adventurer Nanami)
2. Thomas And The Treasure Map (The Caribbean Pirates are After Children!?)
3. Trouble In The Atlantic (The Arrival of the Atlantic Ocean Gang!?)
4. Flight On The High Seas (Run, Run, and Run Some More!!)
5. Saving The Seals (Rio de Janeiro Never Sleeps)
6. The Blue Whale (The Day We Met the Blue Whale)
7. Crisis Beneath The Sea! (At the Bottom of the Atlantic! Thomas Alone!)
8. Al's Treasure Hunt (The Sunken Ship of the Zaire River The Mystery of Treasure)
9. The Secret Of The Cave (The ship that floats in the phantom underground lake)
10. Overland To The Nile (Tico takes the road)
11. Princess Nanami (Nanami, Princess of the Ocean)
12. Friends Of The Family
13. Beware Of The Giant Toys
14. Al Comes Home
15. Nanami Saves the Island
16. Tico's Baby
17. Junior's First Breath
18. Cheryl Gets Engaged
19. Panic In The Oilfield
20. Growing Pains
21. The Legend Of The Northern Lights
22. The Mystery Of The Iceberg
23. The Heart Of The Ice Mountain
24. A Trip To Japan
25. Nanami Remembers
26. A Letter To Grandma (clip show)
27. The Ghost Ship
28. The Deep-Sea Sub
29. Island Of The Butterflies
30. The Miracle Egg
31. Cheryl And Scott Get Stranded
32. New Leads On The Luminous Whale
33. Another Luminous Creature
34. A Close Encounter
35. Discovery!
36. Operation: Capture!
37. The Antarctic Foundation
38. Nature To The Rescue
39. The Shining Circle

== CG film ==
A CG-animated film titled Nanami and the Quest for Atlantis based on the series is currently in production. Unlike the series, the film will take place in 1850 during the Gold Rush era.

== Reception ==
The series was described in The Anime Encyclopedia: "Beautiful designs and a plot combining adventure with ecological correctness make a charming children's series."
