= Masako Ikeda =

Japanese actress (1939–2026)

- 池田 昌子
- Born: January 1, 1939; Tokyo, Japan
- Died: March 3, 2026 (aged 87); Tokyo, Japan
- Occupations: Actress; voice actress; narrator
- Years active: 1948–2026
- Agent: Haikyō
- Website: Official profile

Masako Ikeda (池田 昌子, Ikeda Masako; January 1, 1939 – March 3, 2026) was a Japanese actress, voice actress and narrator from Tokyo, last affiliated with Haikyō.

She is most known for the roles of Reika "Madame Butterfly" Ryuuzaki in Aim for the Ace!, Nodoka Saotome in Ranma ½, Maetel in Galaxy Express 999, Michiko Azuma in Harmagedon, and for being the Japanese dubbing actress of Audrey Hepburn.

Ikeda died from an intracerebral hemorrhage on March 3, 2026, at the age of 87.

== Filmography ==
=== Television animation ===
1960s

- Princess Knight (1967) – Eros
- Judo Boy (1969) – Narieta
- Kamui the Ninja (1969) – Nene

1970s

- Pinocchio: The Series (1972) – The Blue Fairy
- Aim for the Ace! (1973) – Reika "Madame Butterfly" Ryuuzaki
- 3000 Leagues in Search of Mother (1976) – Cipriana
- Galaxy Express 999 (1978) – Maetel
- The Story of Perrine (1978) – Marie Paindavoine

1980s

- Patalliro! (1982) – Etrange, Patalliro's mother
- Aura Battler Dunbine (1983) – Silkey Mau
- Stop!! Hibari-kun! (1983) – Harue
- Bagi, the Monster of Mighty Nature (1984) – Ryo's mother
- The Story of Pollyanna, Girl of Love (1986) – Ruth Carew

1990s

- Sunset on Third Street (1990) – Tomoe Suzuki
- Ranma ½ (1992) – Nodoka Saotome
- Romeo's Blue Skies (1995) – Narrator
- Weiß Kreuz (1998) – Kaoruko Amamiya
- Kindaichi Case Files (1999) – Hazuki Asaki

2000s

- Sakura Wars (2000) – Wakana Shinguji
- Monster (2004) – Leia
- Nagasarete Airantou (2007) – Suzuran
- Kon'nichiwa Anne: Before Green Gables (2009) – Narrator

2010s

- Katanagatari (2010) – Narrator

=== OVA ===
- Devilman: The birth (1987) – Sumiko Fudo
- Vampire Princess Miyu (1988) – Miyu's mother
- Legend of the Galactic Heroes: The Gaiden (1998) – Johanna von Basel
- Yukikaze (2002) – Lynn Jackson

=== Theatrical animation ===
- Queen Millennia (1982) – Cleopatra
- Genma Taisen (1983) – Michiko Azuma
- Dorami & Doraemons: Robot School's Seven Mysteries!? (1996) – Mommy No.14
- X (1996) – Tōru Shirō
- Mobile Suit Gundam Special Edition (2000) – Kamaria Ray

=== Tokusatsu ===
- Ultraman Story (1984) – Mother of Ultra
- Ultraman Mebius (2006) – Mother of Ultra

=== Video games ===
- Lunar 2: Eternal Blue Complete (1998) – Luna
- Dissidia Final Fantasy (2008) – Cloud of Darkness
- Kingdom Hearts Birth by Sleep (2010) – Kairi's grandmother
- Final Fantasy Type-0 (2011) – Cadetmaster
- Final Fantasy XIV: A Realm Reborn (2013) – Hydaelyn

=== Dubbing ===
==== Live-action ====
- Audrey Hepburn
  - Roman Holiday (1972 Fuji TV and 1979 TV Asahi edition) – Princess Ann
  - Sabrina – Sabrina Fairchild
  - War and Peace – Natasha Rostova
  - Funny Face – Jo Stockton
  - Love in the Afternoon – Ariane Chavasse
  - The Nun's Story (1974 TV Asahi edition) – Sister Luke
  - The Unforgiven – Rachel Zachary
  - Breakfast at Tiffany's – Holly Golightly / Lula Mae Barnes
  - The Children's Hour – Karen Wright
  - Charade – Regina "Reggie" Lampert
  - My Fair Lady – Eliza Doolittle
  - Paris When It Sizzles – Gabrielle Simpson
  - How to Steal a Million – Nicole Bonnet
  - Two for the Road – Joanna 'Jo' Wallace
  - Wait Until Dark (1975 TV Asahi edition) – Susy Hendrix
  - Robin and Marian – Lady Marian
  - Bloodline – Elizabeth Roffe
  - Always (1995 NTV edition) – Hap
  - Audrey – Audrey Hepburn
- Airport 1975 (1977 Fuji TV edition) - Sister Ruth (Helen Reddy)
- Amélie – Madeleine Wallace (Yolande Moreau)
- Armour of God II: Operation Condor – Momoko
- Back to the Future Part III (1993 TV Asahi edition) – Clara Clayton (Mary Steenburgen)
- The Chronicles of Riddick – Aereon (Judi Dench)
- Glee – Patti LuPone
- Kramer vs. Kramer – Joanna Kramer (Meryl Streep)
- La Piscine (1978 TV Asahi edition) – Marianne (Romy Schneider)
- The Manchurian Candidate – Senator Eleanor Prentiss Shaw (Meryl Streep)
- Marnie (1969 TV Asahi edition) – Lil Mainwaring (Diane Baker)
- The Plague of the Zombies – Sylvia Forbes (Diane Clare)
- The Reptile – Valerie Spalding (Jennifer Daniel)
- The River Wild – Gail Hartman (Meryl Streep)
- Singin' in the Rain – Kathy Selden (Debbie Reynolds)
- Smash – Liza Minnelli
- The Towering Inferno (1989 TBS edition) – Susan Franklin (Faye Dunaway)

==== Animation ====
- Charlotte's Web – Charlotte A. Cavatica
- Hercules – Hera

== Other roles ==
- Izumi e no michi (1955, film) – Misako Ogawa
- Haromoni@ (2007–08, variety show) – Narrator
- Aoi Honō (2014, TV drama) – Maetel (voice)

== Awards ==
Year	Award	Category	Result	Ref.
2007	1st Seiyu Awards	Achievement Award	Won	
2020	Tokyo Anime Awards 2020	Merit Award	Won	
