= Eiko Yamada =

Japanese actress (born 1953)

- 山田 栄子
- Born: Eiko Hisamura (久村 栄子) née Eiko Yamada (山田 栄子); June 13, 1953 (age 73); Koyasu, Kanagawa Ward, Yokohama, Kanagawa Prefecture, Japan
- Other name: Kuri-chan (クリちゃん)
- Occupations: Voice actress; actress
- Years active: 1977–present
- Agent: 81 Produce
- Notable credits: Anne of Green Gables as Anne; Little Women as Jo; Little Princess Sara as Lavinia; Dragon Ball as Mai; Ginga: Nagareboshi Gin as Gin

Eiko Hisamura (久村 栄子, Hisamura Eiko; born June 13, 1953) née Eiko Yamada (山田 栄子, Yamada Eiko) is a Japanese actress and voice actress from Yokohama, Kanagawa Prefecture, Japan affiliated with 81 Produce.

Hisamura worked under her maiden name before her marriage and for a long time afterwards, so that name is still often used, even among her fans.

She has voiced many characters in the World Masterpiece Theater anime series from Nippon Animation, including lead roles Anne from Anne of Green Gables, Jo from Little Women and supporting role Lavinia in Little Princess Sara. She is also well-known for her roles as Mai in Dragon Ball and as Gin in Ginga: Nagareboshi Gin.

== Filmography ==
=== Television animation ===
- Anime Sanjūshi (Aramis)
- Bikkuriman (Rojin Hood, Shintei Hood)
- Biriken (Gariken)
- Biriken Nan demo Shōkai (Gariken)
- Bōkensha (Queen Isabel)
- Captain Tsubasa (Tarō Misaki (young), Kaori Matsumoto, Yuzo Morisaki)
- City Hunter (Aya (ep.40))
- DNA^2 (Oharu)
- Cybot Robotchi (Sachiko aka "Sgt. Sally" in English version)
- Dragon Ball (Mai)
- Fang of the Sun Dougram (Canary Donetto)
- Game Center Arashi (Satoru Daimonji)
- Ganbare, Kikka-zu! (Hikaru Uesugi)
- Ginga: Nagareboshi Gin (Gin)
- Ginga Sengoku Gunyūden Rai (Rōjin)
- Ginga Shippū Sraiger (Petite Rojji)
- Harukana Receive (Sora Higa)
- Highschool! Kimen-gumi (Mei Undō)
- Igano Kabamaru (Ran Ōkubo, young Hayate Kirino)
- The Kabocha Wine (Kozue)
- Kimagure Orange Road (Yukari)
- Lady Georgie (Abel Butman (young), Jessica)
- Kon'nichiwa Anne 〜 Before Green Gables (Narrator)
- Mīmu Iro Iro Yume no Tabi (Satoru)
- Mission: Yozakura Family (Keiko Yozakura)
- Nagagutsu o Haita Neko no Bōken (Hans)
- Kaibutsu-kun (Demokin)
- Ninja Hattori-kun (Kagechiyo)
- Ninja Senshi Tobikage (Sharumu Baker)
- Oyoneko Būnyan (Maron Kurikōji)
- Parasol Henbē (Kanbē)
- Ranma ½ (Tsubasa Kurenai)
- Robotan (Kan-chan)
- Six God Combination Godmars (Namida Akashi)
- Space Runaway Ideon (Banda Rotta)
- Tetsujin 28-go (Shōtarō Kaneda)
- Those Who Hunt Elves (Garbella, Fortune Teller)
- Video Senshi Laserion (Sahara)
- Wan Wan Sanjūshi (Queen Anne)
- World Masterpiece Theater series:
  - Anne of Green Gables (Anne Shirley)
  - My Daddy Long Legs (Sadi)
  - Little Lord Fauntleroy (Jane Hurt)
  - A Little Princess (Lavinia Herbert, Caesar)
  - Little Women II: Jo's Boys (Jo)
  - Pollyanna (Jimmy Bean)
  - Porphy's Long Journey (Iralia)
  - Sans Famille (Mrs. Milligan)
  - The Sound of Music (Yvonne)
  - Story of the Alps: My Annette (Lucien Morel)
  - Tales of Little Women (Josephine March (Jo))

=== Theatrical animation ===
- Anime Sanjūshi: Aramis no Bōken (Aramis)
- Candy Candy (1992 version) (Eliza Leagan)
- Choro Q Dougram (Canary Donetto)
- Document: Fang of the Sun Dougram (Canary Donetto)
- Dragon Ball Z: Battle of Gods (Mai)
- Galaga (Paula)
- Locke the Superman (Kim)
- Running Boy: Star Soldier no Himitsu (Kenta Shinoyama)
- Space Runaway Ideon series (Banda Rotta)
- Umeboshi Denka: Uchū no Hate kara Panparopan! (Denka)
- Utsunomiko (Kagami)
- Yu-Gi-Oh! The Movie (Shōgo Aoyama)

=== Original video animation (OVA) ===
- 8 Man After (Samu)
- Ace o Nerae! 2 (Ranko Midorikawa)
- Ace o Nerae! Final Stage (Ranko Midorikawa)
- Ai Monogatari (Kyōko)
- Shin Captain Tsubasa (Tarō Misaki)
- Carol (Domosu)
- Chō Robot Seimeitai Transformer Z (Kain)
- Cool Cool Bye (Shiriru Soko)
- Dancougar - Super Beast Machine God: Hakunetsu no Shūshō (Tiore)
- Domain of Murder (Kaoru Kaze)
- Legend of Lemnear (Lemnear)
- Mini 4 Soldier Rin! (Waka)
- Kaibutsu-kun (Demokin)
- Ninja Hattori-kun (Kagechiyo)
- Otohime Connection (Himeko Kamikiba)
- Soratobu Usagi no Yūkai Bōshi Boku Iya da yo! (Mimisuke)
- Unkai no Meikyū Zegay (Himiko)
- Urban Square: Kohaku no Tsugeki (Yuki Tamura)
- Utsunomiko Tenjōhen (Kagami)
- Waragutsu no Naka no Kami-sama (Narration)
- Watto Pō to Bokura no Ohanashi (Nikkusu)
- Yajikita Gakuen Dōchūki series (Reiko Shinokita)
- Yamatarō Kaeru (Yamatarō)

=== Video games ===
- Captain Tsubasa 5: Hasha no Shogo Campione (Taro Misaki)
- Metal Gear Solid (Nastasha Romanenko)
- Super Robot Wars series (Sharumu Baker, Tiore, Shoutarou Kaneda)
- Tengai Makyou II: Manjimaru (Gozen Fubuki, Yoshinobu Fubumi))
- Vasteel 2 (Boyce's mother, female soldier)
- Ys I & II (Tarufu Hadaru)

=== Dubbing ===
- Aliens (1988 TBS edition) (Vasquez (Jenette Goldstein))
- Dances with Wolves (Stands With A Fist (Mary McDonnell))
- Edward Scissorhands (Marge (Caroline Aaron))
- Family Ties (Ellen Reed (Tracy Pollan))
- Highlander (Heather MacLeod (Beatie Edney))
- Jingle All the Way (Liz Langston (Rita Wilson))
- A Little Princess (Lavinia Herbert (Taylor Fry))
- Nine Months (Gail Dwyer (Joan Cusack))
- Oyayubi Kozō Nils Carlsson (Mother)
- Parenthood (1994 TV Tokyo edition) (Karen Buckman (Mary Steenburgen))
- The Shining (Wendy Torrance (Shelley Duvall)
- The Survivor (1983 TV Tokyo edition) (Beth (Angela Punch McGregor))
- Suspiria (Pat Hingle (Eva Axén))
- Terrahawks (Captain Kate Kestrel)
- Teito Monogatari (various)
- The Unseen (Karen Fast (Karen Lamm))
- Zoku Akage no Anne: Anne no Seishun (Pauline)

=== Radio ===
- Hamaraji (FM Yokohama)

=== CD and cassette ===
- Amefuri Hana Saita
- Ares: Shinwa no Seizakyū (Rea)
- Gaia Gear (Marissa Najis)
- Hisaka Fūjin: Hoshi no Musume, Mezameru
- Kai no Hi, Yodaka no Hoshi
- Ningen Club (Elaine)
- Onban Totsuzen Daishūkai
- Oshare Kozō wa Hanamaru
- Petenshi ga Yuku (Caroline)
- Ranma ½ (Tsubasa Kurenai)
- Saint Elza Crusaders (Eri Otoshima)
- Saint Elza Crusaders Bangaihen: Elza Debut!? (Eri Otoshima)

=== Other ===
NHK Education

- 3rd Grade Science Classroom (1984) (Gō-kun)
- Atsumare Jan-Ken-Pon (Hitsuji hara muku, Ralph, Kon-chan, Karasu Medengu, others)
- Bakeruno Shōgakkō Hyūdoro-gumi (Karasu Medengu)
- Zawazawa Mori no Ganko-chan (Mother, School Ghost, Mushroom Witch)

=== Other ===
- Fuji TV 7-nin no Hot Medame (Narration)

== Accolades ==
- Merit Award at the 18th Seiyu Awards (2024)
