= The World Masterpiece Theater =

Japanese anime series

DVD release of Anne of Green Gables (1979), the first series under the World Masterpiece Theater title

The World Masterpiece Theater (世界名作劇場, Sekai Meisaku Gekijō), commonly abbreviated to Meigeki (名劇, Meigeki), was a Japanese prime time television programming block produced by Nippon Animation. The timeslot showcased a different classical book or story from European or North American children's literature each year. It aired at 19:30 to 20:00 on Sunday on Fuji Television and its affiliates. The series ran from 1975 to 1997 with a revival on BS Fuji from 2007 to 2009.

Preceding The World Masterpiece Theater was Calpis Comic Theater, which ran from 1969 to 1974. The programming block aired as Calpis Children's Theater from its official establishment in 1975 to 1977 and as Calpis Family Theater in 1978. The first series aired under the The World Masterpiece Theater title was Anne of Green Gables in 1979.

== History ==
The first several series were produced by Mushi Production and sometimes Tokyo Movie, often commissioned by Zuiyo Enterprise, and then by Zuiyo itself. The series was then continued by Nippon Animation, which was officially established in June 1975 during the run of A Dog of Flanders. In both cases, the series originally aired primarily on Fuji TV. Hayao Miyazaki and Isao Takahata both worked on several of the series. World Masterpiece Theater as produced by Nippon Animation lasted for 23 seasons, from A Dog of Flanders in 1975 to Remi, Nobody's Girl (家なき子レミ, Ie Naki Ko Remi, Sans Famille) in 1997. Nippon Animation restarted the series in 2007 with the release of Les Misérables: Shōjo Cosette, which premiered on BS Fuji on 7 January, with Porufi no Nagai Tabi (The Long Journey of Porphy) subsequently airing on the same network beginning on 6 January 2008, making it the 25th World Masterpiece Theater series. The most recent and 26th series is Kon'nichiwa Anne: Before Green Gables (lit. Hello Anne ~ Before Green Gables).

To date, only seven series were ever dubbed in English for the North American market: Fables of the Green Forest (1973), Tom Sawyer (1980), Swiss Family Robinson (1981), Little Women (1987), The Adventures of Peter Pan (1989), The Bush Baby (1992), and Tico and Friends (1994). The anime satellite television network, Animax, who also aired numerous installments of the series across Japan, later translated and dubbed many of the series' installments into English for broadcast across its English-language networks in Southeast Asia and South Asia, such as Princess Sarah (小公女セーラ, Shōkōjo Sēra), Remi, Nobody's Girl (家なき子レミ, Ie Naki Ko Remi), Little Women (愛の若草物語, Ai no Wakakusa Monogatari), and others. The serials also found success in Europe, with Anne of Green Gables (1979), Heidi, Girl of the Alps, as well as the aforementioned Princess Sarah.

The series has been known by various names over the years, but "the World Masterpiece Theater" is the name most commonly used by viewers. Nippon Animation's official English name for the series is "The Classic Family Theater Series".

The sponsorship of this series has changed several times; the first was Calpis alone (1969–1978), while the second was House Foods alone (1986–1993, 2007–2008).

Starting in 2017 Amazon Prime Video made various series available in HD quality, but cropped for 16:9 displays in the US and UK markets. Amazon did not use the "World Masterpiece Theater" label and only kept the subtitle for each series.

In 2023, Capcom teamed up with Nippon Animation to promote Resident Evil 4 with a mini-series called Resident Evil Masterpiece Theater: Leon and the Mysterious Village (バイオ名作劇場 ふしぎの村のレオン, Baio Meisaku Gekijō: Fushigi no Mura no Reon), with voices provided by the game's development team.

== Companion volume ==
Apart from Fuji TV, there was also a companion volume of the World Masterpiece Theater, which was broadcast on TV Tokyo from 19:30 to 20:00 on Thursday. This is sponsored by Sumitomo Electric Industries alone, but it is characterized by the theme of a specific field rather than the family. Moero! Top Striker (1991) and Jeanie with the Light Brown Hair (1992) are works of this companion volume.

== Recurring casts ==
The following people frequently appeared in the World Masterpiece Theater, including the companion volume on TV Tokyo.

Director

- Kōzō Kusuba
- Yoshio Kuroda: Other than the director, he also worked on storyboards and series composition, for example.

Sound director

- Etsuji Yamada

Voice actor

- Eiko Yamada
- Mitsuko Horie
- Keiko Han
- Rihoko Yoshida
- Taeko Nakanishi
- Yoshiko Matsuo
- Ai Orikasa
- Kazue Ikura
- Kenichi Ogata

== Productions ==
=== Before Nippon Animation – Calpis Comic Theater (1969–1974) ===
Note: These are the only series that are not included into the World Masterpiece Theater franchise.

- Dororo/Dororo and Hyakkimaru (どろろと百鬼丸, Dororo to Hyakimaru; 1969), 26 episodes: Adapted from the manga Dororo by the Japanese manga artist Osamu Tezuka. Produced by Mushi Production. The only series in black and white.
- Moomin (ムーミン, Mūmin; 1969–1970), 65 episodes: Adapted from the Moomin books by the Finnish author Tove Jansson. Produced by Zuiyo and animated by Tokyo Movie Shinsha.
- Andersen Stories (アンデルセン物語, Anderusen Monogatari; 1971), 52 episodes: Adapted from several stories by Hans Christian Andersen, the Danish fairy tale writer. Produced by Zuiyo and animated by Mushi Production.
- New Moomin (新 ムーミン, Shin Mūmin; 1972), 52 episodes: A remake of the 1969–1970 Moomin series, based more closely on the books. Produced by Zuiyo and animated by Mushi Production.
- Fables of the Green Forest (山ねずみ ロッキーチャック, Yama Nezumi Rokkī Chakku; 1973), 52 episodes: Adapted from the stories of animal-themed children's writer, Thornton Burgess. Produced by Zuiyo and animated by Mushi Production.
- Heidi, Girl of the Alps (アルプスの少女ハイジ, Arupusu no Shōjo Haiji; 1974), 52 episodes: Adapted from Heidi by Johanna Spyri. Produced and animated by Zuiyo.

=== Nippon Animation – Calpis Children's Theater (1975–1977) ===
Note: These are the 26 official entries of the World Masterpiece Theater franchise.

- A Dog of Flanders (フランダースの犬, Furandāsu no Inu; 1975), 52 episodes: Adapted from the novel of the same name by Maria Louise Ramé (aka Ouida). First series produced by Nippon Animation but still credited to Zuiyo and broadcast in the Calpis Comic Theater only in episodes 1 to 20 and 24 to 26.
- Marco, 3000 Leagues in Search for Mother (母をたずねて三千里, Haha o Tazunete Sanzen Ri; 1976), 52 episodes: Adapted from a small part of Heart, the chapter named "From the Apennines to the Andes", written by Italian author Edmondo De Amicis.
- Rascal the Raccoon (あらいぐまラスカル, Araiguma Rasukaru; 1977), 52 episodes: Adapted from Rascal by Sterling North.

=== Calpis Family Theater (1978) ===
- The Story of Perrine (ペリーヌ物語, Perīnu Monogatari; 1978), 53 episodes: Adapted from En Famille by Hector Malot.

=== The World Masterpiece Theater (1979–1985; no title sponsor) ===
- Anne of Green Gables (赤毛のアン, Akage no An; 1979), 50 episodes: Adapted from the novel of the same name by Lucy Maud Montgomery.
- The Adventures of Tom Sawyer (トム・ソーヤーの冒険, Tomu Sōyā no Bōken; 1980), 49 episodes: Adapted from the novel of the same name by Mark Twain.
- The Swiss Family Robinson: Flone of the Mysterious Island (家族ロビンソン漂流記 ふしぎな島のフローネ, Kazoku Robinson Hyōryūki: Fushigi na Shima no Furōne; 1981), 50 episodes: Adapted from The Swiss Family Robinson by Johann David Wyss.
- Lucy-May of the Southern Rainbow (南の虹のルーシー, Minami no Niji no Rūshī; 1982), 50 episodes: Adapted from the Australian novel Southern Rainbow by Phyllis Piddington.
- Story of the Alps: My Annette (アルプス物語 わたしのアンネット, Arupusu Monogatari: Watashi no Annetto; 1983), 48 episodes: Adapted from the English children book, Treasures of the Snow by Patricia St. John.
- Katri, Girl of the Meadows (牧場の少女カトリ, Makiba no Shōjo Katori; 1984), 49 episodes: Adapted from the Finnish novel Paimen, piika ja emäntä by Auni Nuolivaara.
- Princess Sara (小公女セーラ, Shōkōjo Sēra; 1985), 46 episodes: Adapted from A Little Princess by Frances Hodgson Burnett.

=== The House Foods World Masterpiece Theater (1986–1994) ===
- The Story of Pollyanna, Girl of Love (愛少女ポリアンナ物語, Ai Shōjo Porianna Monogatari; 1986), 51 episodes: Adapted from Pollyanna and Pollyanna Grows Up, by Eleanor H. Porter.
- Tales of Little Women (愛の若草物語, Ai no Wakakusa Monogatari; 1987), 48 episodes: Adapted from Little Women by Louisa May Alcott.
- Little Prince Cedie (小公子セディ, Shōkōshi Sedi; 1988), 43 episodes: Adapted from Frances Hodgson Burnett's novel, Little Lord Fauntleroy.
- The Adventures of Peter Pan (ピーターパンの冒険, Pītā Pan no Bōken; 1989), 41 episodes: Adapted from J. M. Barrie's novel, Peter and Wendy.
- My Daddy Long Legs (私のあしながおじさん, Watashi no Ashinaga Ojisan; 1990), 40 episodes: Adapted from Daddy-Long-Legs by Jean Webster.
- Trapp Family Story (トラップ一家物語, Torappu Ikka Monogatari; 1991), 40 episodes: Adapted from the real lives of the von Trapp Family, which also inspired the musical The Sound of Music and its film version.
- The Bush Baby (大草原の小さな天使 ブッシュベイビー, Daisōgen no Chiisana Tenshi Busshu Beibī; 1992), 40 episodes: Adapted from The Bushbabies by William Stevenson.
- Little Women II: Jo's Boys (若草物語 ナンとジョー先生, Wakakusa Monogatari: Nan to Jōsensei; 1993), 40 episodes: Adapted from Little Women's sequel, Little Men by Louisa May Alcott.
- Tico and Friends (七つの海のティコ, Nanatsu no Umi no Tiko; 1994), 39 episodes: An original story. (Note: The first ten episodes were solely sponsored by House Foods on Fuji TV and its affiliates until episode 11 when other sponsors were introduced in the timeslot.)

=== The World Masterpiece Theater (1995–1997; no title sponsor) ===
- Romeo's Blue Skies (ロミオの青い空, Romio no Aoi Sora; 1995), 33 episodes: Adapted from Die schwarzen Brüder by Kurt Held (published under the name of his wife Lisa Tetzner).
- Famous Dog Lassie (名犬ラッシー, Meiken Rasshī; 1996), 26 episodes: Adapted from the short story Lassie Come-Home by Eric Knight.
- Remi, Nobody's Girl (家なき子レミ, Ie Naki Ko Remi; 1996–1997), 26 episodes: Adapted from Sans Famille by Hector Malot.

=== The House Foods World Masterpiece Theater (2007–2008) ===
- Les Misérables: Little Girl Cosette (レ・ミゼラブル 少女コゼット, Re Mizeraburu Shōjo Kozetto; 2007), 52 episodes: Adapted from Les Misérables by Victor Hugo.
- The Long Journey of Porphy (ポルフィの長い旅, Porufi no Nagai Tabi; 2008), 52 episodes: Adapted from The Orphans of Simitra by Paul-Jacques Bonzon.

=== The World Masterpiece Theater (2009) ===
- Hello Anne: Before Green Gables (こんにちは アン 〜Before Green Gables, Konnichiwa An 〜Bifō Guriin Gēburusu; 2009), 39 episodes: Adapted from the Anne of Green Gables prequel, Before Green Gables by Budge Wilson.

== Feature films ==
Two additional theatrical feature film remakes were produced as part of the franchise:

- The Dog of Flanders: The Movie (劇場版 フランダースの犬, Gekijōban Furandāsu no Inu, 1997)
- Marco: 3000 Leagues in Search of Mother (Marco 母をたずねて三千里, Maruko Haha o Tazunete Sanzenri, 1999)

Re-edited footage films of Heidi, Girl of the Alps, 3000 Leagues in Search of Mother, The Story of Perrine and Anne of Green Gables were also released in theater in Japan over the years. Subsequently, every series of the franchise received a re-edited footage OVA released on DVD by Bandai and later broadcast as TV specials.

== See also ==
- Masterpiece Theater, an unrelated yet similar anthology series produced by GBH Boston for PBS
- Animated Classics of Japanese Literature
- Hallmark Hall of Fame
