= Kon'nichiwa Anne: Before Green Gables =

Japanese anime television series

- こんにちは アン 〜Before Green Gables
- Genre: Adventure, slice of life, drama
- Based on: Before Green Gables by Budge Wilson
- Written by: Michiru Shimada
- Directed by: Katsuyoshi Yatabe
- Voices of: Rina Hidaka; Seiko Tamura; Setsuji Satō; Rika Wakusawa; Yumiko Kobayashi; Chiaki Shimogana; Taeko Kawata; Satomi Kōrogi; Nana Yamaguchi; Hiroki Tanaka; Maya Okamoto; Harumi Suga; U-ko Tachibana; Masayo Fujita; Mitsuko Horie
- Narrated by: Masako Ikeda
- Music by: Yasuharu Takanashi; Hiromi Mizutani; Kenji Fujisawa
- Country of origin: Japan
- Original language: Japanese
- No. of episodes: 39

Production
- Executive producer: Kōichi Motohashi
- Producers: Masashi Yamamoto; Nobuaki Tanaka
- Production company: Nippon Animation

Original release
- Network: BS Fuji
- Release: April 5 – December 27, 2009

Konnichiwa Anne: Before Green Gables (Japanese: こんにちは アン 〜Before Green Gables, Hepburn: Konnichiwa An 〜Bifō Guriin Gēburusu; lit. 'Hello Anne: Before Green Gables') is a Japanese anime television series; it is the 26th entry in Nippon Animation's World Masterpiece Theater franchise. The series is an adaptation of Canadian children's literature author Budge Wilson's 2008 prequel novel Before Green Gables, which was translated into Japanese as Konnichiwa Anne (こんにちは アン) by Akiko Usagawa. It chronicles the early years of main character Anne Shirley as she loses both her parents and is adopted by Matthew and Marilla Cuthbert.

It aired on BS Fuji from April to December 2009 as well as Animax starting a month later.

== Production and development ==
Introduced in Lucy Maud Montgomery's 1908 novel Anne of Green Gables, the series marks the 100th anniversary of the original novel's release and the 30th anniversary of its anime adaptation, Akage no Anne, also produced by Nippon Animation and one of the first pioneering World Masterpiece Theater series. The announcement trailer was narrated by Eiko Hisamura, who portrayed Anne in the original Akage no Anne.

While developing the series, Nippon Animation's staff undertook research by visiting a historical village in southeastern Canada which formed the inspiration for Avonlea in the novel, going to historical houses preserved from the era in which the novel is set and taking photographs, with core staff members and character designer and chief animation director Takayo Nishimura (previously chief animation director and character designer for 5 Centimeters Per Second), basing the characters, props and settings on them and also from historical books that he bought there. Nippon Animation's staff have followed this format of contextual research while producing other World Masterpiece Theater series.

The series premiered on April 5, 2009, and aired every Sunday from 19:30 to 20:00 JST on BS Fuji. From May 2009, it also aired on Animax. Online streaming on Biglobe was announced, but was eventually suspended.

== Staff ==
- Director: Katsuyoshi Yatabe
- Series composition and screenplay: Michiru Shimada
- Original character design: Yoshiharu Satō
- Character designs and chief animation director: Takayo Nishimura
- Music: Yasuharu Takanashi, Hiromi Mizutani, Kenji Fujisawa
- Art director: Shigeru Morimoto
- Colour design: Tomoko Komatsubara
- Production: Nippon Animation

== Characters ==
Anne Shirley
Voiced by: Rina Hidaka
A red hair little girl who is orphaned after her parents' death.
Joanna (Harrigan) Thomas
Voiced by: Seiko Tamura
Anne's maternal aunt, wife to Bert and mother to Eliza, Horace, Edward, Harry and Noah. She is constantly trying the make ends meet, and as such is often in a bad mood.
Bert Thomas
Voiced by: Setsuji Satō
Joanna's husband and father to her children. Due to his laziness and alcoholism, he is unable to hold down a job, usually spending whatever money he earns from the oddjobs he does on cheap liquor.
Eliza Thomas
Voiced by: Rika Wakusawa
First born daughter of Thomas family and primary income of the household. She cares for Anne like her own child, but later marries Roger Emerson and leaves Anne behind.
Horace Thomas
Voiced by: Yumiko Kobayashi
First son of the Thomas family.
Edward Thomas
Voiced by: Chiaki Shimogama
Second son of the Thomas family.
Harry Thomas
Voiced by: Taeko Kawata
Third son of the Thomas family.
Noah Thomas
Voiced by: Satomi Kōrogi
Fourth son of the Thomas family.
Jessie (MacIntyre) Gleeson
Voiced by: Mitsuko Horie
An old widower with high standing.
Lochinvar
Anne's companion cat. His name is taken from a line of the poem "Marmion" by Walter Scott.
Narration
Voiced by: Masako Ikeda
