= Anne of Green Gables =

1908 novel by Lucy Maud Montgomery

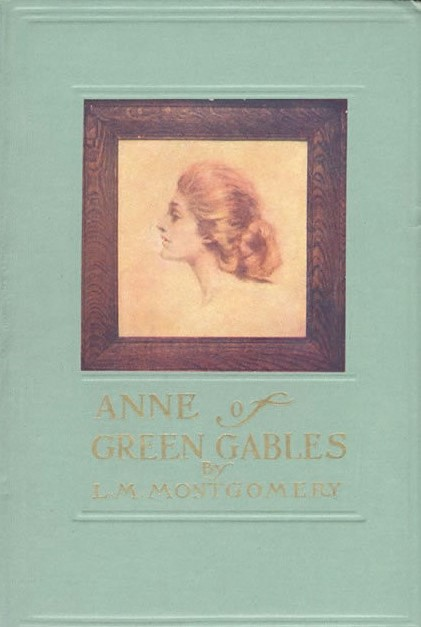
- Cover art of the first edition
- Author: Lucy Maud Montgomery
- Illustrator: M. A. and W. A. J. Claus
- Cover artist: George Gibbs
- Language: English
- Series: Anne of Green Gables
- Genre: Novel
- Set in: Prince Edward Island
- Published: June 13, 1908
- Publisher: L.C. Page & Co.
- Publication place: Written and set in Canada, published in the United States
- Pages: 429
- Followed by: Anne of Avonlea
- Text: Anne of Green Gables at Wikisource

Anne of Green Gables is a 1908 novel by the Canadian author Lucy Maud Montgomery (published as L. M. Montgomery). Written for all ages, it has been considered a classic children's novel since the mid-20th century. Set in the late 19th century, the novel recounts the adventures of an 11-year-old orphan girl Anne Shirley sent by mistake to two middle-aged siblings, Matthew and Marilla Cuthbert, who had originally intended to adopt a boy to help them on their farm in the fictional town of Avonlea in Prince Edward Island, Canada. The novel recounts how Anne makes her way through life with the Cuthberts, in school, and within the town.

Anne of Green Gables has been translated into at least 36 languages and has sold more than 50 million copies, making it one of the best-selling books worldwide to date in any language, and is taught to students around the world. It was the first of many novels; Montgomery wrote numerous sequels. In 2008, an authorized prequel, Before Green Gables by Budge Wilson was published on the occasion of the 100th anniversary of the series.

The book has been adapted as films, television film, and animated and live-action television series. Musicals and plays have also been created, with productions annually in Canada, Europe, and Japan.

== Source ==
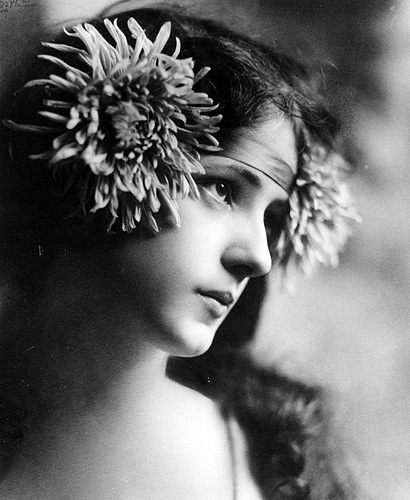
The portrait of Evelyn Nesbit by Rudolf Eickemeyer Jr. which inspired Montgomery

In writing the novel, Montgomery was inspired by notes she had made as a young girl about two siblings who were mistakenly sent an orphan girl instead of the boy they had requested, yet decided to keep her. She drew upon her childhood experiences in rural Prince Edward Island, Canada. Montgomery used a photograph of Evelyn Nesbit, which she had clipped from New York's Metropolitan Magazine and put on the wall of her bedroom, as the model for the face of Anne Shirley and a reminder of her "youthful idealism and spirituality."

Montgomery was inspired by the formula stories (called such because they followed such a predictable formula) that were popular at the time, featuring orphans, and often girls with the name Ann; however, she distinguished her character by spelling her name with an extra "e". She based other characters, such as Gilbert Blythe, in part on people she knew. She said she wrote the novel in the twilight of the day while sitting at her window and overlooking the fields of Cavendish.

== Summary ==
Anne Shirley, a young orphan from the fictional community of Bolingbroke, Nova Scotia (based upon the real community of New London, Prince Edward Island), is sent to live with Marilla and Matthew Cuthbert, unmarried siblings in their fifties and sixties, after a childhood spent in strangers' homes and orphanages. Marilla and Matthew had originally sought to adopt a boy from the orphanage to help Matthew run their farm at Green Gables, which is set in the fictional town of Avonlea (based on Cavendish, Prince Edward Island). Through a misunderstanding, the orphanage sends Anne instead.

Anne is fanciful, imaginative, eager to please, and dramatic. She is also adamant her name should always be spelled with an "e" at the end. However, she is defensive about her appearance, despising her red hair, freckles, and pale, thin frame, but liking her nose. She is talkative, especially when it comes to describing her fantasies and dreams. At first, stern Marilla says Anne must return to the orphanage, but after much observation and consideration, along with kind, quiet Matthew's encouragement, Marilla decides to let her stay.

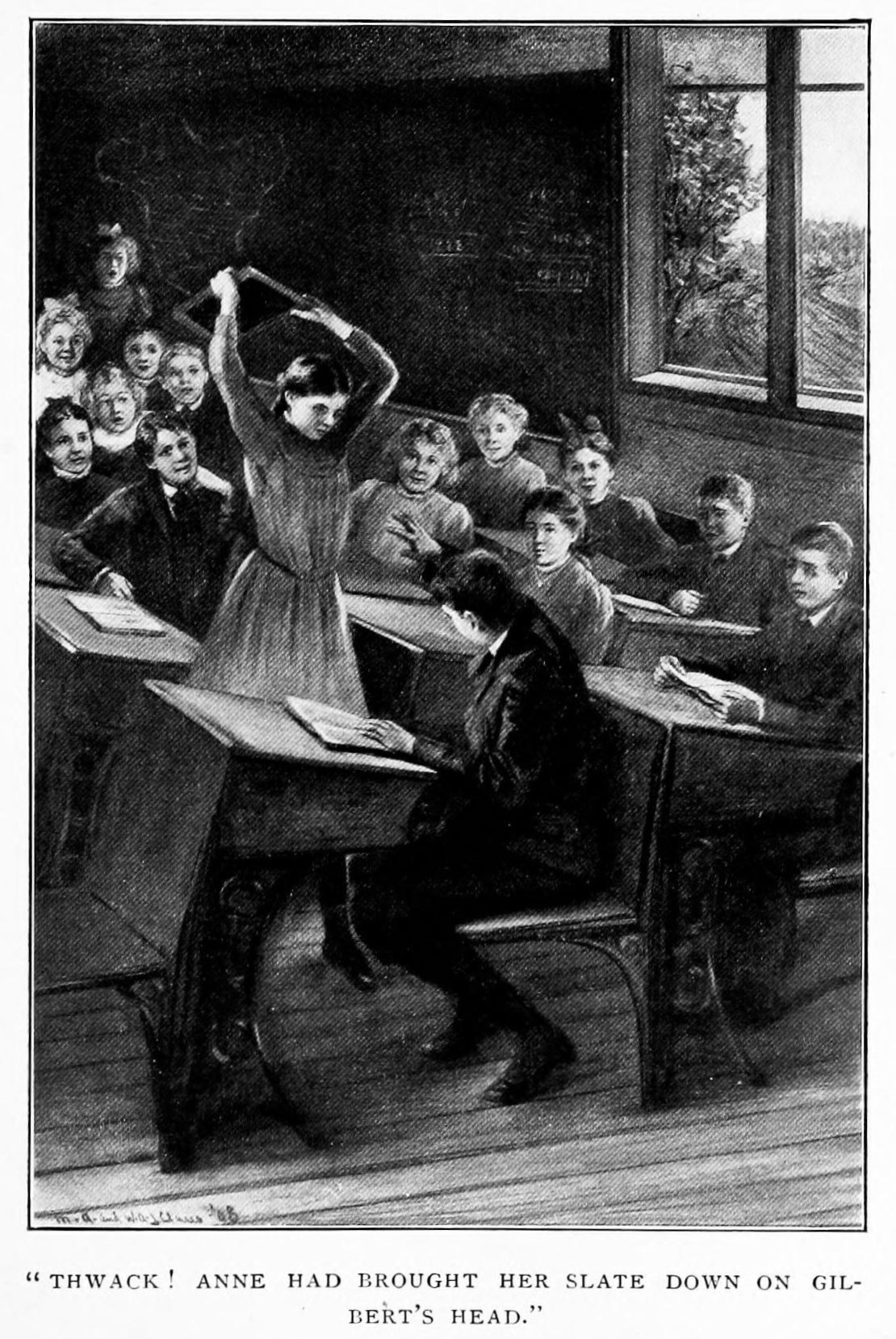
Anne smashes her slate on Gilbert's head after being called 'carrots'

The book recounts Anne's struggles and joys in settling into Green Gables (the first real home she's ever known): the country school where she quickly excels in her studies; her friendship with Diana Barry, the girl living next door (her best or "bosom friend" as Anne fondly calls her); her budding literary ambitions; and her rivalry with her classmate Gilbert Blythe, who teases her about her red hair. For that, he earns her instant hatred, although he apologizes several times. As time passes, however, Anne realizes she no longer hates Gilbert, but her pride and stubbornness keep her from speaking to him.

The book also follows Anne's adventures in Avonlea. Episodes include playtime with her friends Diana, calm, placid Jane Andrews, and beautiful, boy-crazy Ruby Gillis. She has run-ins with the unpleasant Pye sisters, Gertie and Josie, and frequent domestic "scrapes" such as dyeing her hair green while intending to dye it black, and accidentally getting Diana drunk by giving her what she thinks is raspberry cordial but which turns out to be currant wine.

At sixteen, Anne goes to Queen's Academy to earn a teaching license, along with Gilbert, Ruby, Josie, Jane, and several other students, excluding Diana, much to Anne's dismay. She obtains her license in one year instead of the usual two and wins the Avery Scholarship awarded to the top student in English. This scholarship would allow her to pursue a Bachelor of Arts (B.A.) degree at the fictional Redmond College (based on the real Dalhousie College) on the mainland in Nova Scotia.

Near the end of the book, however, tragedy strikes when Matthew dies of a heart attack after learning that all of his and Marilla's money has been lost in a bank failure. Out of devotion to Marilla and Green Gables, Anne gives up the scholarship to stay at home and help Marilla, whose eyesight is failing. She plans to teach at the Carmody school, the nearest school available, and return to Green Gables on weekends. In an act of friendship, Gilbert Blythe gives up his teaching position at the Avonlea School in favor of Anne, to work at the White Sands School instead, knowing that Anne wants to stay close to Marilla after Matthew's death. After this kind act, Anne and Gilbert's friendship is cemented, and Anne looks forward to what life will bring next.

== Characters ==
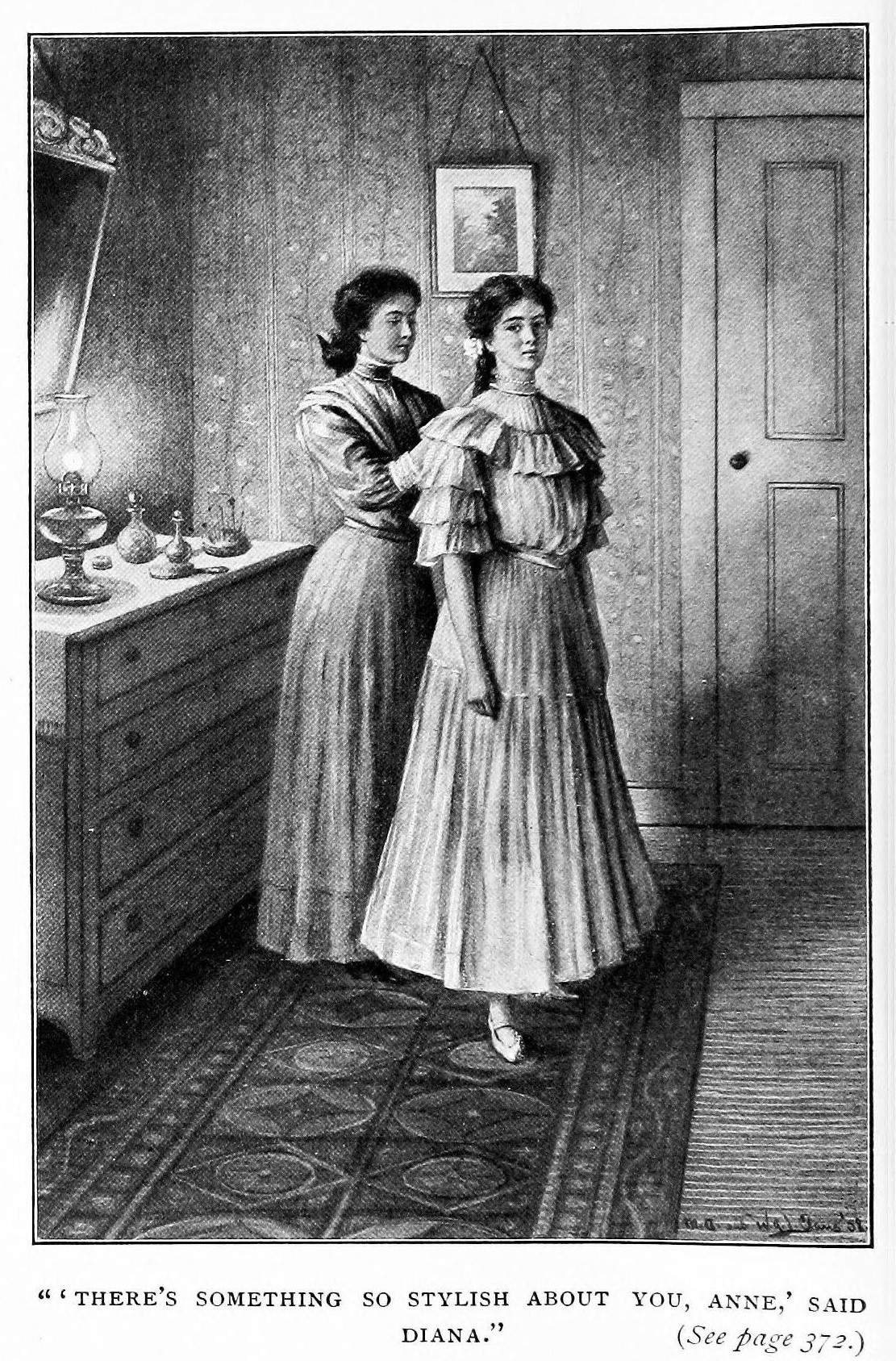
Diana and Anne

=== The Green Gables household ===
- Anne Shirley: An imaginative, talkative, red-haired orphan who comes to live with Matthew and Marilla Cuthbert at age 11. Anne is highly sensitive and dislikes the colour of her hair. Anne's bleak early childhood was spent being shuttled from orphanage to foster homes, caring for younger children. She is excited to finally have a real home at Green Gables.
- Marilla Cuthbert: Matthew's sister, an austere but fair woman who has the "glimmerings of a sense of humour." Her life has been colourless and without joy until the arrival of Anne. She tries to instill discipline in the child but grows to love Anne's vivacity and joy.
- Matthew Cuthbert: Marilla's brother, a shy, kind man who takes a liking to Anne from the start. The two become fast friends and he is the first person to ever show Anne unconditional love. Although Marilla has primary responsibility for rearing Anne, Matthew has no qualms about "spoiling" her and indulging her with pretty clothes and fancy shoes.

=== Anne's friends/classmates ===
- Diana Barry: Anne's best friend and a kindred spirit. Anne and Diana become best friends from the moment they meet. She is the only girl of Anne's age who lives close to Green Gables. Anne admires Diana for being pretty with black hair and flawless complexion and for her amiable disposition. Diana lacks Anne's vivid imagination but is a loyal friend.
- Gilbert Blythe: A handsome, smart, and witty classmate, two years older than Anne, who has a crush on her. Unaware of Anne's sensitivity about her red hair, he tries to get her attention by holding her braid and calling her "Carrots" in the classroom, and she breaks a slate over his head. Despite his attempts at an apology, Anne's anger and stubbornness prevent her from speaking to him for several years. By the end of the book, however, they apologise and become good friends.
- Ruby Gillis: Another of Anne's friends. Having several "grown-up" sisters, Ruby loves to share her knowledge of beaux with her friends. She is pretty and blonde, but rather empty-headed and prone to hysterics.
- Jane Andrews: One of Anne's good friends from school, she is plain and sensible. She does well enough academically to join Anne's class at Queen's.
- Josie Pye: A classmate generally disliked by the other girls (as are her siblings), Josie is vain, dishonest, sharp-tongued, and jealous of Anne's popularity.
- Prissy Andrews: Another school companion of Anne's, who is assumed to be in a relationship with the teacher, Mr. Phillips.

=== Avonlea's locals ===
- Mrs. Rachel Lynde: A neighbour of Matthew and Marilla, Mrs. Lynde is a noted busybody but is also industrious and charitable. Although she and Anne start off on the wrong foot due to Mrs. Lynde's blunt criticism and Anne's short temper, they soon become quite close. Mrs. Lynde is married to Thomas Lynde, who is mentioned several times but never appears, and has raised ten children.
- Mr. Teddy Phillips: Anne's first teacher at Avonlea, Mr. Phillips is unpopular with students. In Anne's case, he continually misspells her name (without the "E") and punishes only her among the twelve pupils who arrive late, resulting in Anne's refusal to attend school for several weeks. Once, he punished Anne for losing her temper with Gilbert Blythe. He is described as lacking discipline, and "courts" one of his older pupils, Prissy Andrews, openly.
- Miss Muriel Stacy: Anne's loveable, energetic replacement teacher, who loves wildlife almost as much as Anne herself. Her warm and sympathetic nature appeals to her students, but some of Avonlea's more old-fashioned parents disapprove of her teaching methods. Miss Stacy is another "kindred spirit," whom Anne views as a mentor. Miss Stacy encourages Anne to develop her character and intellect and helps prepare her for the entrance exam at Queen's Academy.
- Reverend and Mrs. Allan: The minister and his wife also befriend Anne, with Mrs. Allan becoming particularly close. She is described as pretty and is a "kindred spirit."
- Mr. George Barry and Mrs. Barry: Diana's parents. Mr. Barry is unseen save for late in the book when he drives Anne and Diana to Charlottetown. He is a farmer. Near the end of the book, he offers to rent some tracts to help out Anne and Marilla, after Matthew's death. Mrs. Barry is a strict parent. After Anne accidentally gets Diana drunk, Mrs. Barry forbids Diana to have anything to do with Anne. This sanction is repealed after Anne saves Diana's younger sister, Minnie May.
- Minnie May Barry: Diana's baby sister, whose life is saved by Anne when she becomes infected with croup.

=== Others ===
- Bertha & Walter Shirley: Anne's biological parents. Both are young and poor when they have Anne, both were under 21 when Anne was born. Both were school teachers in Bolingbroke. Bertha loved Anne very much, and thinking her very beautiful and sweet. Bertha died of fever when Anne was three months old, Walter died four days afterwards from fever as well.
- Mrs. Thomas: After Anne's parents die when she is around 3 months of age, Mrs. Thomas takes her in. She and her husband move away from Bolingbroke to Marysville, and Anne lived with them until she is eight years old. Anne helps them take care of the four younger Thomas children. Mr. Thomas, who is a drunk, died after falling under a train and Mrs. Thomas move in with her mother in law, but Anne is not brought with them. Instead she is sent to stay with the Hammonds.
- Mrs. Hammond: Anne lives with her for a portion of her pre–Green Gables life and cares for Mrs. Hammond's three sets of twins. Anne is sent to the Hopetown orphan asylum when Mrs. Hammond is forced to break up her home after her husband's sudden death.
- Mrs. Spencer: A house wife and mother who mistakenly brought Anne from the orphan asylum to PEI. She went the asylum to adopt a little girl, Lily Jones, for herself and had been tasked by Matthew and Marilla to bring them a boy of about 10-11 years of age. Matthew and Marilla sent word to Mrs. Spencer through her brother Robert, who in turn tasked his daughter Nancy to give the message to Mrs. Spencer. There was a miscommunication during this passing of the message and Mrs. Spencer was told to bring them a girl of 10-11 years old.
- Miss Josephine Barry: Diana's wealthy great-aunt from Charlottetown. She is initially severe, but is quickly charmed and entertained by Anne's imagination, and invites her and Diana to tea. She refers to Anne as "the Anne-girl" and even sends Anne beaded slippers as a Christmas present.

== Reception ==
The New York Times Book Review delivered a scathing review of the book in 1908:

[I]n spite of her tender years, and in spite of the fact that she had passed all of her life with illiterate folks and had almost no schooling, Anne talked to the farmer and his sister as though she had borrowed Bernard Shaw’s dictionary, Alfred Austin’s sentimentality, and the reasoning powers of a justice of the Supreme Court. She knew so much that she spoiled the author’s plan at the very outset and greatly marred a story that had in it quaint and charming possibilities.”

The Times reconsidered its early assessment in 1996, acknowledging that it may have "slipped up badly."

== Publication history ==
Anne of Green Gables was first published by L.C. Page & Co. of Boston on June 13, 1908. The book quickly became a best-seller, selling over 19,000 copies in the first five months. Since then, over 50 million copies have been sold worldwide. A full scan of the first edition, first impression is provided by the L. M. Montgomery Institute.

Montgomery's original manuscript is preserved by the Confederation Centre of the Arts, in Charlottetown, Prince Edward Island. Since 2022, the Centre has hosted a project in which digital images of the entire manuscript can be examined online. A transcript of the manuscript was published by Nimbus Publishing in 2019.

Montgomery's original typescript and the corrected proofs are lost.

In 2019, Canadian publishing company Bradan Press crowdfunded a Scottish-Gaelic translation of Anne of Green Gables, titled Anna Ruadh, through the crowdfunding website Kickstarter. The book, released in 2020, is the first Scottish-Gaelic translation of Anne of Green Gables.

== Related works ==
Based on the popularity of her first book, Montgomery wrote a series of sequels to continue the story of her heroine Anne Shirley.

Lucy Maud Montgomery's books on Anne Shirley:
№	Book	Date published	Timeline year
1	Anne of Green Gables	1908	11–16
2	Anne of Avonlea	1909	16–18
3	Anne of the Island	1915	18–22
4	Anne of Windy Poplars (Canada and USA); Anne of Windy Willows (UK and Australia)	1936	22–25
5	Anne's House of Dreams	1917	25–27
6	Anne of Ingleside	1939	34–40
The following books focus on Anne's children, or on other family friends. Anne appears in these volumes, but plays a lesser part.
№	Book	Date published	Timeline year
7	Rainbow Valley	1919	41–43
8	Rilla of Ingleside	1921	49–53
9	The Blythes Are Quoted	2009	40–75
Anne Shirley features in one story (and is referenced in other stories) in each of the following collections:
№	Book	Date published	Timeline year
—	Chronicles of Avonlea	1912	approx. 20
—	Further Chronicles of Avonlea	1920	approx. 20

The prequel, Before Green Gables (2008), was written by Budge Wilson with the authorization of the heirs of L. M. Montgomery.

== Tourism and merchandising ==
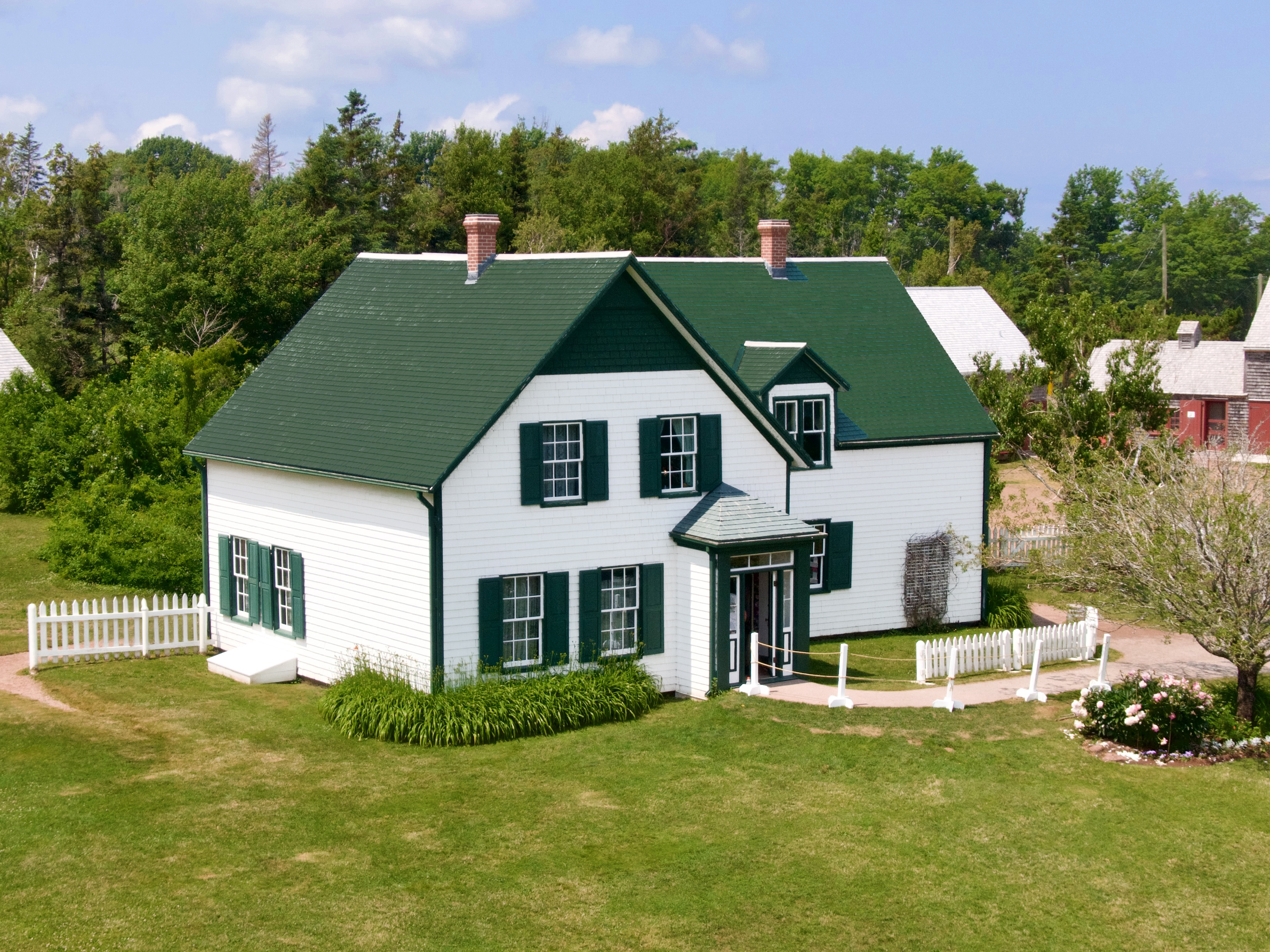
The Green Gables farmhouse located in Cavendish

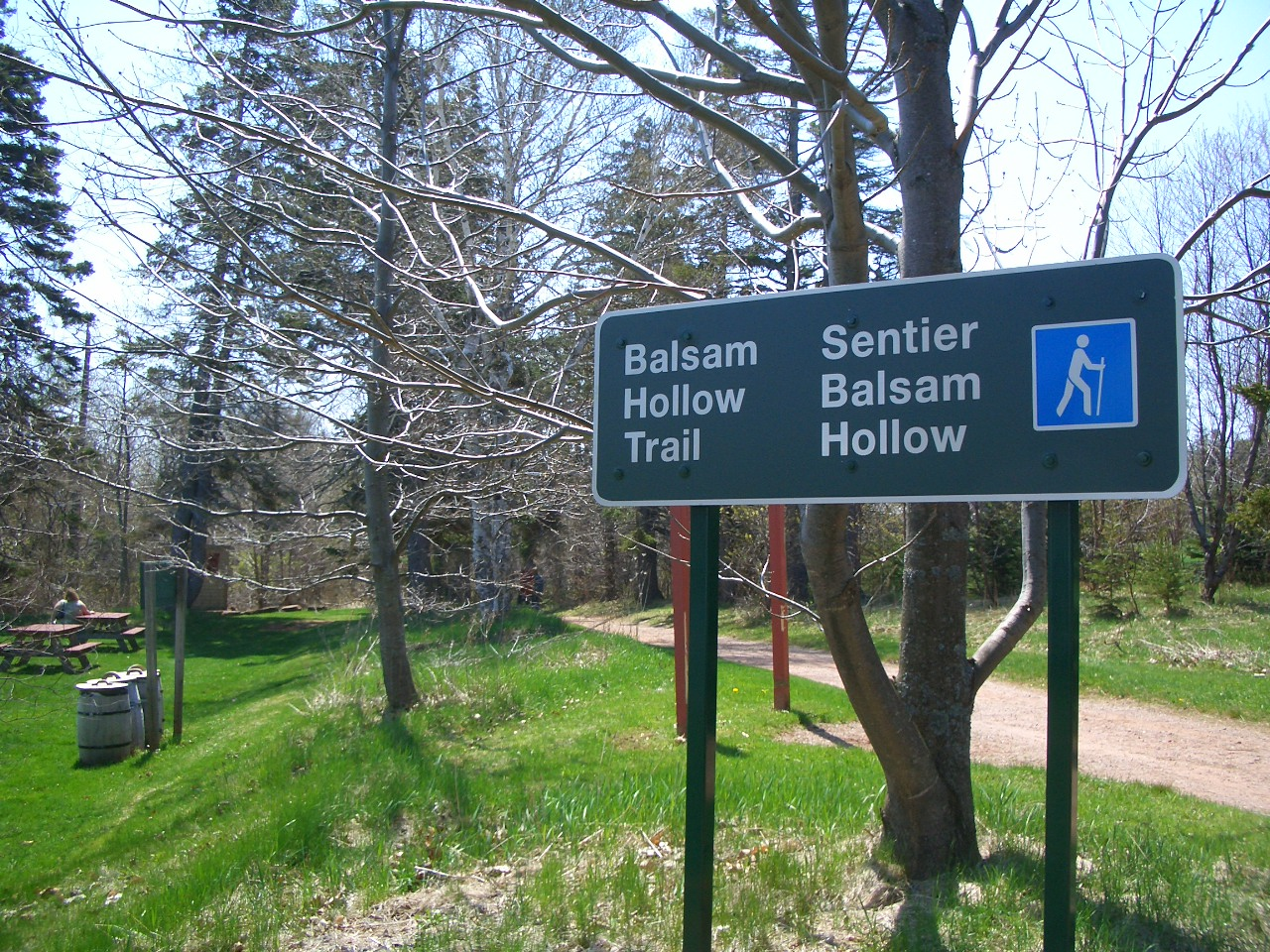
Sign marking trail through Balsam Hollow

The Green Gables farmhouse is located in Cavendish, Prince Edward Island. Many tourist attractions on Prince Edward Island have been developed based on the fictional Anne, and provincial license plates once bore her image. Balsam Hollow, the forest that inspired the Haunted Woods and Campbell Pond, the body of water which inspired The Lake of Shining Waters, both described in the book, are located in the vicinity. The Anne of Green Gables Museum is located in Park Corner, PEI, in a home that inspired L. M. Montgomery.

The province and tourist facilities have highlighted the local connections to the internationally popular novels. Anne of Green Gables has been translated into 36 languages. According to the Canadian Broadcasting Corporation, "tourism by Anne fans is an important part of the Island economy".

The novel has been popular in Japan, where it is known as Red-haired Anne (赤毛のアン (Akage no An)), and where it has been included in the national school curriculum since 1952. 'Anne' is revered as "an icon" in Japan, especially since 1979 when this story was broadcast as an anime, Anne of Green Gables. Japanese couples travel to Prince Edward Island to have civil wedding ceremonies on the grounds of the Green Gables farm. Some Japanese girls arrive as tourists with red-dyed hair styled in pigtails, to look like Anne.

A replica of the Green Gables house in Cavendish is located in the theme park Canadian World in Ashibetsu, Hokkaido, Japan. The park was a less expensive alternative for Japanese tourists instead of traveling to P.E.I. The park hosted performances featuring actresses playing Anne and Diana. The theme park is open during the summer season with free admission, though there are no longer staff or interpreters.

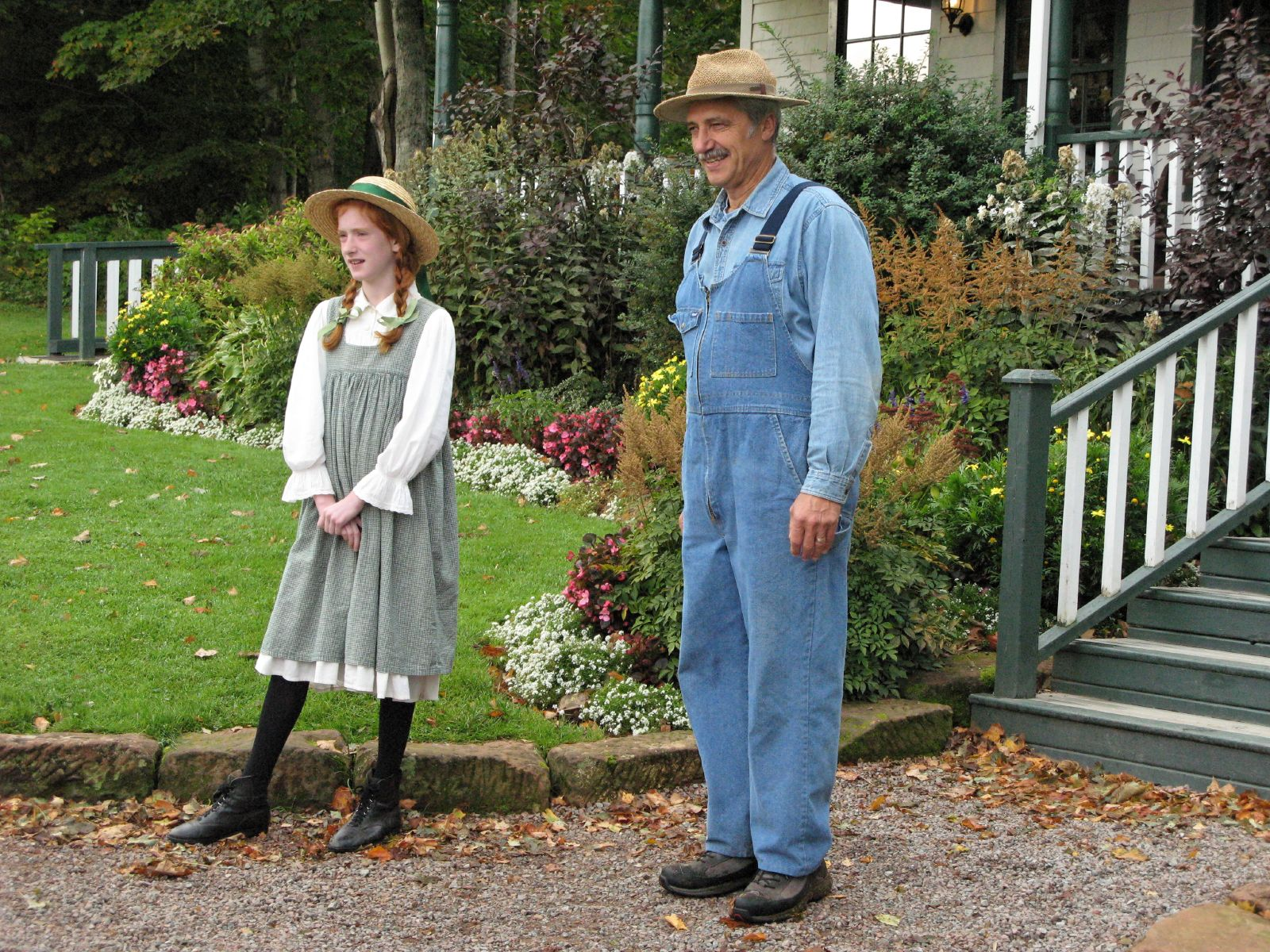
An actress as Anne

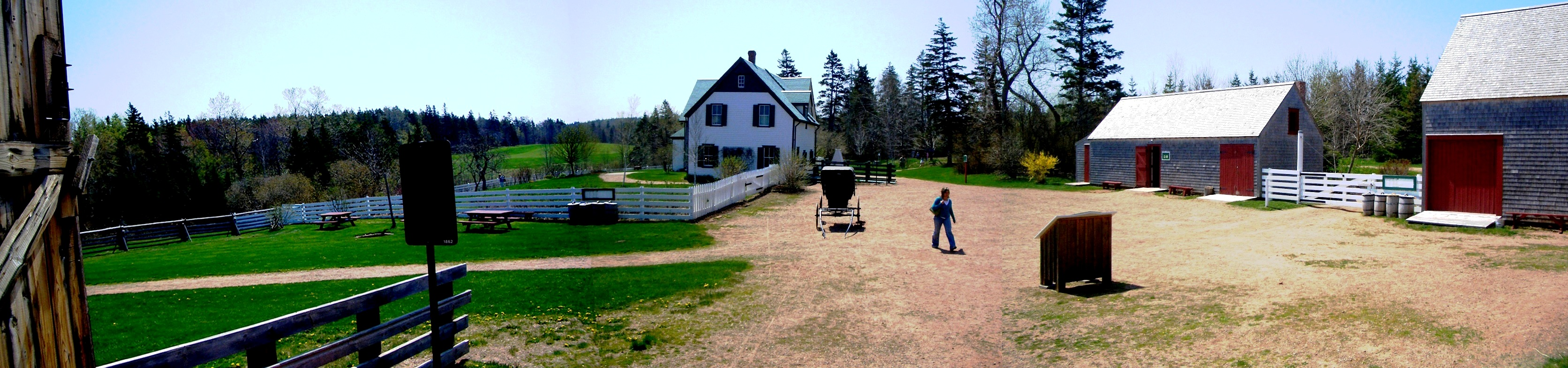
Panorama of Green Gable farmhouse and grounds in Cavendish
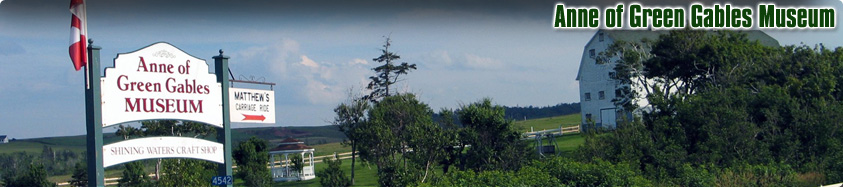
Entrance to Anne of Green Gables Museum in Park Corner

== Legal status ==
=== Copyright and trademark status ===
As the original novel Anne of Green Gables was first published in 1908, it has entered the public domain in many countries following the expiration of its copyright term. However, the commercial use of the title, characters and related imagery remains subject to trademark protection in some jurisdictions.

The Anne of Green Gables Licensing Authority Inc. (AGGLA), jointly owned by the Province of Prince Edward Island and the Heirs of L. M. Montgomery Inc., administers and licenses trademarks associated with the franchise. According to the organization, it controls the use of the Anne of Green Gables name and related trademarks, as well as words and images depicting the fictional characters, places and events described in Montgomery's novels.

The name Anne of Green Gables is also registered as a trademark in several jurisdictions by the AGGLA, including registrations covering entertainment services and merchandising.

=== Trademark dispute in Japan ===
In 2001, Sullivan Entertainment International Inc. held a Japanese trademark registration for "Anne of Green Gables", the original English title of Montgomery's novel. In 2004, the Province of Prince Edward Island petitioned the Japan Patent Office (JPO) to invalidate the registration for certain classes of goods, and the JPO subsequently declared the registration invalid in part. Sullivan sought judicial review of the decision before the Intellectual Property High Court of Japan.

In 2006, the Intellectual Property High Court dismissed Sullivan's appeal and upheld the JPO's decision. The court found that the trademark registration had been obtained without the consent of the Province of Prince Edward Island, the author's heirs and the AGGLA, and concluded that maintaining the registration would be contrary to the principle of good faith and to international comity between Japan and Canada under Article 4(1)(vii) of the Japanese Trademark Act.

== Legacy and honours ==
Buildings

- The popularity of the books and subsequent film adaptations is credited with inspiring the design and naming of buildings "Green Gables". An example still standing is an apartment block called "Green Gables" built in the 1930s, in New Farm, Queensland, Australia.

Museum

- Bala's Museum, located in Bala, Ontario, Canada, is a house museum established in 1992 and dedicated to Lucy M. Montgomery information and heritage. The house was a tourist home owned by Fanny Pike when Montgomery and her family stayed there on a summer vacation in 1922. That visit to the region inspired the novel The Blue Castle (1926). The town is named Deerwood in the novel; this was Montgomery's only narrative setting outside Atlantic Canada.

Postage stamps

- On May 15, 1975, Canada Post issued Lucy Maud Montgomery, Anne of Green Gables designed by Peter Swan and typographed by Bernard N.J. Reilander. The 8¢ stamps are perforated 13 and were printed by Ashton-Potter Limited.
- In 2008, Canada Post issued two postage stamps and a souvenir sheet honouring Anne and the "Green Gables" house.

Reading lists

- In 2003, Anne of Green Gables was ranked number 41 in The Big Read, a BBC survey of the British public to determine the "nation's best-loved novel" (not children's novel).
- In 2012, it was ranked number nine among all-time children's novels in a survey published by School Library Journal, a monthly with primarily U.S. audience.

== Adaptations ==
=== Films ===
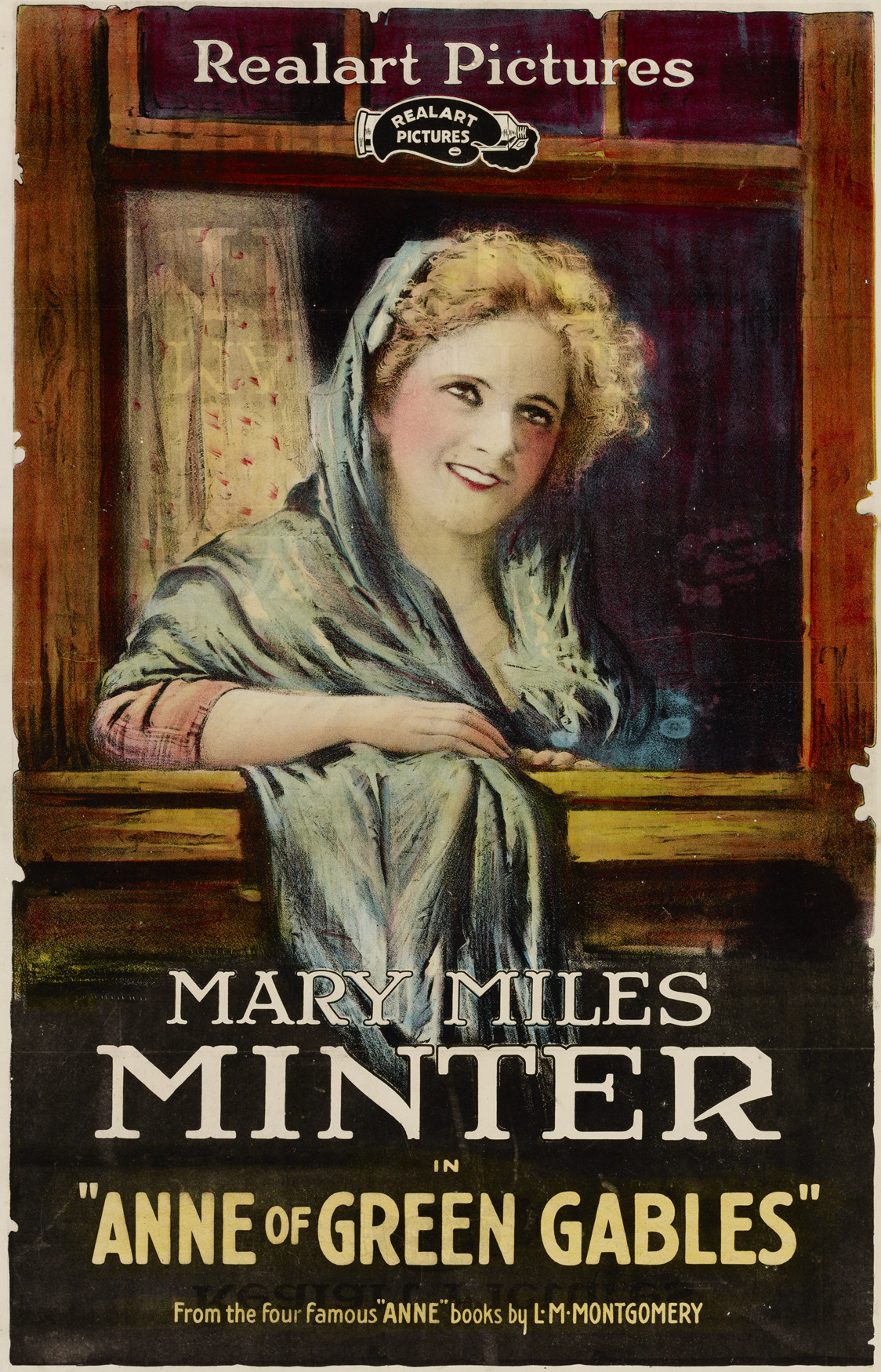
Anne of Green Gables (1919)

The first filmed appearance of Anne Shirley was in the 1919 silent film, Anne of Green Gables, in which the role was played by Mary Miles Minter. The film was directed by William Desmond Taylor. As of 2011, no prints of this silent film adaptation are known to survive. The 1919 film version moved the story from Prince Edward Island to New England, which one American critic—unaware that the novel was set in Canada—praised for "the genuine New England atmosphere called for by the story". Montgomery herself was infuriated with the film for changing Anne from a Canadian to an American, writing in her diary:

It was a pretty little play well photographed, but I think if I hadn't already known it was from my book, that I would never had recognized it. The landscape and folks were 'New England', never P.E Island...A skunk and an American flag were introduced - both equally unknown in PE Island. I could have shrieked with rage over the latter. Such crass, blatant Yankeeism!.

Montgomery disapproved of Minter's performance, writing she had portrayed "a sweet, sugary heroine utterly unlike my gingerly Anne", and complained about a scene where Shirley waved about a shotgun as something that her Anne would never do.

In the 1934 adaptation of the novel, Anne was portrayed by Dawn O'Day, who legally changed her name to "Anne Shirley." She reprised the role in Anne of Windy Poplars, a 1940 film adaptation. Montgomery liked the 1934 film more than the 1919 film, not least because now the book's dialogue could be portrayed on the silver screen and that two scenes were filmed on location in Prince Edward Island (though the rest of the film was shot in California), but still charged that neither the 1919 nor 1934 versions of Anne of Green Gables quite got her book right. Writing about the 1934 version of Anne of Green Gables, Montgomery wrote in her diary that it was a "thousand times" better than the 1919 version, but still it: "was so entirely different from my vision of the scenes and the people that it did not seem like my book at all". The British scholar Faye Hammill wrote that 1934 film version stripped Anne of the "Canadian and feminist" aspects that the Anne of the books possessed, stating that there was something about Anne that Hollywood cannot get right. Hammill observed that the idea that Anne was entirely cheerful is a product of the film and television versions as the Anne of the books has to deal with loss, rejection, cruel authority figures, and loneliness.

==== List ====
- Anne of Green Gables (1919), a silent film adapted to the screen by Frances Marion, directed by William Desmond Taylor, and starring Mary Miles Minter as Anne; this is considered a lost film.
- Anne of Green Gables (1934), directed by George Nichols Jr. and starring Dawn O'Day as Anne Shirley; after filming, O'Day changed her screen name to Anne Shirley.
- Anne of Windy Poplars (1940), directed by Jack Hively, is a black & white "talkie" starring Dawn O'Day as Anne Shirley, now billed as "Anne Shirley".
- Akage no An: Green Gables e no Michi (1989, released in 2010) Red-haired Anne: Road to Green Gables - anime, directed by Isao Takahata. A 100-minute theatrical movie compilation of the first six episodes of the animated television series Akage no An, edited together by Takahata in 1989. The film went unreleased until July 17, 2010, when it was screened at the Ghibli Museum.

=== Radio productions ===
- Anne of Green Gables (1941), a British radio drama produced and broadcast by BBC Home Service Basic, adapted into four parts by Muriel Levy, and starring Cherry Cottrell as Anne.
- Anne of Green Gables (1944), a recreation of the 1941 BBC Radio drama, produced and broadcast by BBC Home Service Basic.
- Anne of Green Gables (1954), a Canadian radio drama produced and broadcast by CBC Radio, adapted into 13 parts by Andrew Allen and starring Toby Tarnow as Anne.
- Anna zo Zeleného domu (1966), a Slovak radio drama produced and broadcast by Czechoslovak Radio, starring Anna Bučinská as Anne.
- Anne of Green Gables (1971), a British radio drama produced and broadcast by BBC Radio 4, adapted into 13 parts by Cristina Sellors, and read by Ann Murray.
- Anne of Green Gables (1997), a British radio drama produced and broadcast by BBC Radio 4, dramatized into five parts by Marcy Kahan and starred Barbara Barnes as Anne.
- Anne of Green Gables (2004), an American radio drama produced for Focus on the Family Radio Theatre and starring Mae Whitman as Anne.

=== Stage productions ===
- Anne of Green Gables: The Musical, performed annually in the summer, at Charlottetown Festival, since 1965, this is Canada's longest-running main stage musical production, and has had a total audience of more than 2 million. Anne of Green Gables – The Musical was composed by Canadians Don Harron and Norman Campbell, with lyrics by Elaine Campbell and Mavor Moore. The production has been performed before Queen Elizabeth II and it has toured across Canada, the United States, Europe, and Japan. In 1969, it had a run in London's West End. The Charlottetown Festival production performed at the 1970 World's Fair in Osaka, Japan. Walter Learning directed and organized a successful national tour of the musical in Japan in 1991.
- The Guild in Charlottetown, Prince Edward Island, hosts Anne and Gilbert, The Musical. Written by Nancy White, Bob Johnston, and Jeff Hochhauser, the production is based on Montgomery's sequels featuring Anne Shirley.
- Theatreworks USA, a New York-based children's theatre company, produced an Anne of Green Gables musical in 2006 at the Lucille Lortel Theatre. A revived production, with musical contributions from Gretchen Cryer, is planned to tour grade-schools.
- Anne and Gilbert is a musical adaptation of the books Anne of Avonlea and Anne of the Island. It depicts the relationship of Anne and Gilbert during their years as teachers and college students, and their return to Avonlea.
- A "folk-rock" adaptation entitled Anne of Green Gables by Matte O'Brien and Matt Vinson was premiered at the 2018 Finger Lakes Musical Theatre Festival, with a subsequent 2020 concept album and a 2022 production at Goodspeed Opera House.

=== Television films and episodic series (animated) ===
- Akage no An (1979; Red-Haired Anne), an animated television series, part of Nippon Animation's World Masterpiece Theater, produced in Japan and directed by Isao Takahata.
- Anne of Green Gables: The Animated Series (2001), a PBS Kids animated series for older children ages eight to twelve, created by Sullivan Entertainment Inc.
- Anne: Journey to Green Gables (2005), an animated video film produced by Sullivan Entertainment and the prequel to Anne of Green Gables: The Animated Series (2001–2002)
- Kon'nichiwa Anne: Before Green Gables (2009), part of the World Masterpiece Theater, this prequel to Akage no An is based on Budge Wilson's authorized prequel Before Green Gables (2008).
- Anne Shirley (2025), an animated television series adaptation produced in Japan by The Answer Studio and directed by Hiroshi Kawamata, adapts the novel for the first ten episodes.

=== Television films and miniseries ===
- Anne of Green Gables (1952), a BBC television series starring Carole Lorimer as Anne. Broadcast live, no recordings are thought to have ever existed, as it was made before telerecording was practiced by the BBC.
- Anne of Green Gables (1956), a made-for-television musical version directed by Norman Campbell and starring Toby Tarnow as Anne.
- Anne de Green Gables (1957), a French-Canadian television film directed by Jacques Gauthier, starring Mireille Lachance as Anne Shirley.
- Anne of Green Gables (1958), a recreation of the 1956 film directed by Don Harron, starring Kathy Willard as Anne.
- Anne of Green Gables (1972), a British made-for-television 5-part mini-series directed by Joan Craft, starring Kim Braden as Anne.
  - Anne of Avonlea (1975), a British made-for-television 4-part mini-series sequel directed by Joan Craft, starring Kim Braden as Anne.
- Anne of Green Gables (1985), a CBC four-hour television mini series directed by Kevin Sullivan with Megan Follows as Anne; widely considered the definitive version to date.
  - Anne of Green Gables: The Sequel (1987), a sequel to the 1985 miniseries which aired on CBC and the Disney Channel as Anne of Avonlea: The Continuing Story of Anne of Green Gables. Follows reprises her role.
  - Road to Avonlea (1990–1996) shown on CBC, a live-action television spin-off series based upon characters and episodes from several of L.M. Montgomery's other books. Anne herself never appears but other characters from the previous two films are included, and the series is set within the same continuity as Sullivan's 1980s miniseries.
  - Anne of Green Gables: The Continuing Story (2000), a sequel to the 1985 television miniseries not based on the novels. Follows reprises Anne Shirley once again.
  - Anne of Green Gables: A New Beginning (2008), a prequel to the 1985 television miniseries not based on the novels. Hannah Endicott-Douglas plays young Anne, and Barbara Hershey plays Anne as an adult.
- L.M. Montgomery's Anne of Green Gables (2016), a 90-minute made-for-television adaptation of the book by Breakthrough Films & Television, adapted by Susan Coyne, directed by John Kent Harrison, and stars Ella Ballentine as Anne, Sara Botsford as Marilla Cuthbert, and Martin Sheen as Matthew Cuthbert. It was followed by Anne of Green Gables: The Good Stars and Anne of Green Gables: Fire & Dew (both in 2017).
- Anne with an E (2017–2019), a Canadian joint CBC-Netflix episodic drama that developed the subtext of trauma in the novel through original storylines. It was adapted by Moira Walley-Beckett, and stars Amybeth McNulty as Anne Shirley, Geraldine James as Marilla Cuthbert, R. H. Thomson as Matthew Cuthbert, and Lucas Jade Zumann as Gilbert Blythe.

=== Web productions ===
- Green Gables Fables (2014–2016), an American-Canadian web series which adapts the story in the form of vlogs and social media posts. It is a modern adaptation of Anne of Green Gables and Anne of the Island, featuring Mandy Harmon as Anne.
- Project Green Gables (2015–2018), an English-spoken Finnish web series which adapts and modernises Anne of Green Gables, Anne of Avonlea and Anne of the Island. It presents the story in the form of vlogs and social media posts, with Laura Eklund Nhaga playing Anne.

=== Comics ===
- Akage no An (1984), a three volume manga adaptation of the original novel by Keiko Sugimoto and published by Kodansha
- Akage no An (1985) an adaptation by mangaka Akemi Matsuzaki.
- Yumiko Igarashi adapted the first three novels across five volumes in 1997-1998 for Kumon Publishing.
- Rainbow Valley (2003), a two volume manga adaptation of the seventh novel in the series by Chieko Hara for Kodansha.
- Anne of Green Gables (2013), a manga adaptation of the original novel was created by Mako Takami and published by Shogakukan in Japan as part of their World Masterpiece Collection.
- Anne of Green Gables (2010-2014), a four-issue adaptation by CW Cooke and Giancarlo Malagutti was published by TidalWave Productions. It was later collected in a trade paperback in 2014.
- Anne Shirley (2025), a manga adaptation of the anime series by The Answer Studio illustrated by Akane Hoshikubo began serialization in Enterbrain's B's Log Comic online magazine on January 5, 2025.

== Sources ==
- Bollick, Kate. 2008. “Chick-Lit Pioneer” New York Times, August 15, 2008. https://www.nytimes.com/2008/08/17/books/review/Bolick-t.html Accessed 15 August, 2026.
- Jordan, Tina and Qasim, Noor, 2021, in New York Times Book Review: 125 of Literary History. Tina Jordan with Noor Qasim, editors. p. 66 Clarkson Potter Publishers, New York. Random House. ISBN 978-0-593-23461-7

== Bibliography ==
- Bustard, Ned (January 2009). Anne of Green Gables Comprehension Guide. Veritas Press. ISBN 978-1-932168-79-2.
- Campbell, Norman (1972). Anne of Green Gables. Samuel French, Inc. ISBN 978-0-573-68002-1.
- Gammel, Irene (2008). Looking for Anne of Green Gables: The Story of L.M. Montgomery and her Literary Classic. authorized by the heirs of L. M. Montgomery.
- Gammel, Irene; Benjamin Lefebvre (May 30, 2010). Anne's World: A New Century of Anne of Green Gables. University of Toronto Press. ISBN 978-1-4426-1106-1.
- Montgomery, Lucy Maud (June 3, 2008). The Green Gables Collection. Doubleday Canada. ISBN 978-0-385-66599-5.
- Montgomery, L. M. (1997). The Annotated Anne of Green Gables. Oxford University Press. ISBN 978-0-195-10428-8. Critical edition, edited by Wendy E. Barry, Margaret Anne Doody, and Mary E. Doody Jones.
- Montgomery, L. M. (2004). Anne of Green Gables. Broadview Press. ISBN 978-1-551-11362-3. Critical edition, edited by Cecily Devereux.
- Montgomery, L. M. (2007). Anne of Green Gables. W. W. Norton. ISBN 978-0-393-92695-8. Critical edition, edited by Elizabeth Waterston and Mary Henley Rubio.
- Montgomery, L. M. (2017). Anne of Green Gables. Penguin Classics. ISBN 978-0-195-10428-8. Critical edition, edited by Benjamin Lefebvre.
- Montgomery, L. M. (2019). Anne of Green Gables: The Original Manuscript. Nimbus Publishing. ISBN 978-1-771-08721-6. Edited by Carolyn Strom Collins.
- Russell, Russell, Wilmshurst (1986). Lucy Maud Montgomery: A Preliminary Bibliography. University of Waterloo Library. ISBN 9780920834428.
- Teran, Andi (June 2015). Ana of California. Penguin Books. ISBN 978-0-14-312649-2.
