= The Metaphor =

Short story by Budge Wilson

- Short story by Budge Wilson
- Language: English
- Genre: Short story

Publication
- Published in: Chatelaine (1st release), Inside Stories II, The Leaving, Close Ups: Best Stories for Teens, Fractures: Family Stories
- Publication place: Canada
- Media type: Magazine (1st release)

"The Metaphor" is a short story by Budge Wilson. It was originally published in the October 1983 issue of Chatelaine magazine.

The story has appeared in numerous collection books. First, it appeared in the 1987 collection Inside Stories II. Next, it appeared in Wilson's own 1990 collection, The Leaving (also known by the name The Leaving and Other Stories for some reprints). It was also included in the 2000 collection Close Ups: Best Stories for Teens. Lastly, it was featured in another one of Wilson's collections, her 2002 book Fractures: Family Stories.

== Plot summary ==
The story begins in 1965, following Charlotte and her seventh-grade class. Their teacher, Miss Hancock, enthuses the class and encourages Charlotte to develop her writing. After being taught how to create metaphors, Charlotte compares her mother to an office building: efficient but unfriendly. Charlotte's mother disapproves of Miss Hancock for her flamboyancy.

Once Charlotte is in the tenth grade, she again has Miss Hancock as a teacher. However, this new class does not respect Miss Hancock, and Charlotte distances herself from the teacher. Several months later, Miss Hancock is killed by a school bus. Believing this death to be a suicide, Charlotte is overcome with grief, feeling that she is partly responsible.

Receiving no sympathy from her mother, Charlotte returns to an old notebook. She creates a metaphor that compares Miss Hancock to a birthday cake filled with useful party favors; the contents of the cake are valuable, but they're overlooked by adults who only see the garish exterior.

== Interpretations ==
Dr. John Noell Moore said of the story:

Wilson's story reminds me that we are daily challenged to nurture, to mother, our students in the love of words, to help them understand how language enables them to read the existing world as well as write new worlds of their own. [...] Wilson's story gives us moments to pause and reflect on the significance of the lessons we teach.

Janice Kulyk Keefer asserts the story draws connections "between language and sexuality," contending that Charlotte's mother is a critique of puritan attitudes, and Miss Hancock embodies sensuous pleasure; thus, Charlotte's metaphors represents her blossoming independence and, more broadly, reenforce how language can be a tool for liberation.

== Reception ==
"The Metaphor" appeared in Chatelaine because it placed second in a competition hosted by the magazine.

The story is considered to be among Wilson's most noteworthy, and it is often incorporated into teaching curricula.
