= Before Green Gables =

2008 novel by Budge Wilson

- Cover of Viking Canada 2008 Hardcover
- Author: Budge Wilson
- Language: English
- Series: Anne of Green Gables
- Genre: Children's novel
- Publisher: Viking Press
- Publication date: February 5, 2008
- Publication place: Canada
- Media type: Print (Hardcover)
- Pages: 400
- ISBN: 0-425-22576-3
- OCLC: 312933557
- Preceded by: Anne of Ingleside

Before Green Gables is the title of a prequel to Anne of Green Gables. The book was published in 2008 by Puffin, a division of Penguin Books, as part of Puffin's celebration of Anne of Green Gables centennial anniversary.

The author of the prequel is Canadian children's author Budge Wilson. In the official press release, Budge Wilson wrote: "I will, of course, try to be true to the astonishing character that Lucy Maud Montgomery created… But I would not – in fact, could not – presume to tell my part of Anne's history in Montgomery's voice. I will do this in my own voice, hoping that she would approve of the project if she were alive today."

== Synopsis ==
This book describes Anne's difficult childhood, including the death of her parents, her subsequent life with the Thomas and Hammond families, and her time in an orphanage.

== Publisher ==
Three editions are available from different publishers:

- Canada: Viking Canada (AHC), February 5, 2008, ISBN 978-0-670-06721-3
- US: Putnam Pub Group, February 21, 2008, ISBN 978-0-399-15468-3
- UK: Penguin Books, March 6, 2008, ISBN 978-0-14-138412-2

== Translation ==
Before Green Gables was translated into Japanese as Kon'nichiwa Anne (meaning "Hello, Anne") and sold by Shinchosha and Polish as Droga do Zielonego Wzgórza (meaning "Road/Way to Green Gables"), published by Wydawnictwo Literackie. The book was also translated in French with the title Anne... : Avant la maison aux pignons verts (meaning "Anne : Before Green Gables..."), published by Trécarré. An Italian translation was published by Kappa Edizioni with the title Sorridi, piccola Anna dai capelli rossi (meaning "Smile, Little Red-Haired Anna").

== Reception ==
Benjamin Lefebvre, co-chairman of the L.M. Montgomery Research Group wrote, "while the links to Montgomery’s series are not always seamless, Before Green Gables is nevertheless a captivating story in its own right."

The book garnered positive reviews from both The Guardian and Publishers Weekly, which praised its emotional storytelling and compelling characters.

Kirkus Reviews delivered an opposing review predicting "[t]his drab, unappealing story probably won’t please Anne’s many admirers, nor will it inspire a new audience for Anne of Green Gables."

== Adaptation ==
The series was adapted into an anime, Kon'nichiwa Anne: Before Green Gables, the latest entry in Nippon Animation's World Masterpiece Theater series. It aired in Japan from April 5, 2009 to December 27, 2009.

== See also ==
- Anne of Green Gables: A New Beginning, a prequel television film released in 2008.
