= Budge Wilson =

Canadian writer (1927–2021)

Budge Wilson CM ONS
- Born: Budge Marjorie Archibald; May 2, 1927; Halifax, Nova Scotia, Canada
- Died: March 19, 2021 (aged 93); Halifax, Nova Scotia, Canada
- Education: Dalhousie University
- Writing career
- Language: English
- Notable works: Before Green Gables, The Metaphor

Budge Marjorie Wilson CM ONS (née Archibald; May 2, 1927 – March 19, 2021) was a Canadian writer. She was noted for her work in children's literature.

Wilson started her career in writing in her fifties. Her first book was published in 1984, when she was 56. In total she wrote more than thirty books, mostly children's books, won several awards, and was a recipient of the Order of Canada and the Order of Nova Scotia.

== Early life ==
Wilson was born in Halifax, Nova Scotia, on May 2, 1927. Her father, Maynard Brown Archibald, was a judge; her mother was Helen MacGregor Archibald. Wilson studied philosophy and psychology at Dalhousie University, graduating with a Bachelor of Arts in 1949. She then undertook postgraduate studies at the University of Toronto from 1949 to 1951. She obtained a Diploma of Education in 1953, as well as a certificate in physical education.

== Career ==
Wilson's first job was as a teacher of English and art at Halifax Ladies' College for one year starting in 1951. She was subsequently employed by the Institute of Child Study at the University of Toronto from 1953 until 1957. There, she was responsible for filing, editing, and art work. After stints at the Toronto Public Library and Acadia University nursing school, Wilson went back to teaching in 1968. She became a fitness instructor at the Peterborough County Board of Education and Young Women’s Association in Peterborough, working in that capacity until 1987.

Wilson delved into writing full time starting in 1978. She published her first book, The Best/Worst Christmas Present Ever, in 1984 at the age of 56. She recounted that writing during the six-year interval was a challenge, describing how she was "getting pretty discouraged" by the fifth year. As of 2011 she had written 33 books. These include the prequel Before Green Gables, a celebratory centennial release to the Anne of Green Gables series. It became the largest-ever foreign rights sale for Penguin Canada, and was eventually adapted into an animated series in Japan titled Kon'nichiwa Anne: Before Green Gables. Wilson also authored The Leaving, a collection of short stories that won first prize in the Canadian Broadcasting Corporation's Literary Competition for Adult Short Story in 1991. It won the Canadian Library Association Young Adult Book Award and the City of Dartmouth Book Award for Fiction that same year, and went on to be listed as one of "The 75 best children's books of the last 25 years" by the American Library Association in 1994. It was also shortlisted for the Commonwealth Writers’ Prize for Best Book in the Canada–Caribbean Region.

Other noted works of Wilson's include Lorinda's Diary and Thirteen Never Changes (1991). She dedicated her book Fractures (2002) to both her eleventh grade teacher and her English professor at Dalhousie. One of her final works was After Swissair (2016), a poetry collection chronicling the aftermath of the crash of Swissair Flight 111 off the coast of Nova Scotia on September 2, 1998.

== Honours and awards ==
Wilson received numerous awards for her work that include: 23 Canadian Children's Book Centre "Our Choice" selections, a Marianna Dempster Award, two Ann Connor Brimer Awards, a Canadian Authors Association Lilla Stirling Award, a National IODE (Imperial Order Daughters of the Empire) Violet Downey Award, an Atlantic Independent Booksellers Award, and an IBBY (International Board on Books for Young People) Honour Award. She was appointed a Member of the Order of Canada in 2004, and received the Order of Nova Scotia in 2011. One year later, Wilson received the Queen Elizabeth II Diamond Jubilee Medal.

Wilson received honorary degrees from Dalhousie University (2010) and Mount Saint Vincent University (2012).

== Personal life ==
Wilson married Alan Wilson in 1953. They met while studying at Dalhousie together. He was the founding chair of the Departments of History and Canadian Studies at Trent University. They had two children.

After living in Peterborough, Ontario, for 33 years, Wilson and her husband went back to Nova Scotia in 1989 and resided in Northwest Cove on St. Margarets Bay. During her later years, they moved into a retirement facility in Halifax.

Wilson died on March 19, 2021, at a hospital in Halifax. She was 93, and suffered from complications from a fall earlier that month.

== Selected works ==
- The best/worst Christmas present ever. Richmond Hill: Scholastic. 1984. ISBN 9780590714303. OCLC 70423980.
- A house far from home. Richmond Hill: Scholastic-TAB. 1986. ISBN 9780590716796. OCLC 16056445.
- Mr. John Bertrand Nijinsky and Charlie. Illustrated by Terry Roscoe Boucher. Halifax: Nimbus. 1986. ISBN 9780920852576. OCLC 16049024.
- Thirteen never changes. New York: Scholastic. 1989. ISBN 9780590434881. OCLC 25072715.
- The leaving. Toronto: Anansi. 1990. ISBN 9780887841590. OCLC 21152651.
- Oliver's wars. Toronto: Stoddart. 1992. ISBN 9780773755086. OCLC 25203030.
- Cordelia Clark. Toronto: Stoddart. 1994. ISBN 9780773674233. OCLC 32857017.
- The courtship. Concord: Anansi. 1994. ISBN 9780887845505. OCLC 29597583.
- The dandelion garden and other stories. New York: Philomel Books. 1995. ISBN 9780399227684. OCLC 30893737.
- Mothers and other strangers. San Diego: Harcourt Brace. 1996. ISBN 9780152003128. OCLC 32465206.
- Duff the giant killer. Illustrated by Kim LaFave. Halifax: Formac. 1997. ISBN 9780887803826. OCLC 36188074.
- Sharla. Toronto: Stoddart Kids. 1997. ISBN 9780773674677. OCLC 37981812.
- The long wait. Illustrated by Eugenie Fernandes. Toronto; Buffalo: Stoddart Kids. 1997. ISBN 9780773730212. OCLC 35934927.
- Duff's monkey business. Illustrated by Kim LaFave. Based on Going bananas by Max Dann. Halifax: Formac Pub. 2000. ISBN 9780887804984. OCLC 43277535.
- The fear of Angelina Domino. Illustrated by Eugenie Fernandes. Toronto; New York: Stoddart Kids. 2000. ISBN 9780773732179. OCLC 43283669.
- A fiddle for Angus. Illustrated by Susan Tooke. Toronto; Plattsburgh: Tundra Books. 2001. ISBN 9780887765001. OCLC 46616474.
- Fractures. Toronto: Penguin. 2002. ISBN 9780143312017. OCLC 49305435.
- Izzie : the Christmas that almost wasn't. Toronto: Penguin. 2002. ISBN 9780141002729. OCLC 49305361.
- Friendships. Toronto: Penguin. 2006. ISBN 9780143017660. OCLC 62227631.
- Before Green Gables. New York: G.P. Putnam's Sons. 2008. ISBN 9780399154683. OCLC 233173795. (IODE Violet Downey Book Award, 2009).
