= Beyblade: Fierce Battle =

- US DVD Cover

Japanese name
- Kanji: 爆転シュート ベイブレード The Movie 激闘!!タカオ VS大地
Transcriptions
- Revised Hepburn: Bakuten Shoot Beyblade The Movie: Gekitō!! Takao vs Daichi
- Directed by: Tetsuo Yasumi
- Written by: Yoshio Takeuchi; Kouji Miura; Yoshifumi Fukushima
- Based on: Beyblade by Takao Aoki
- Produced by: Hiroya Nishimura; Takao Murakami
- Music by: Hiroyuki Hayase
- Production company: Nippon Animedia
- Distributed by: Toho
- Release date: August 17, 2002
- Running time: 70 minutes
- Country: Japan
- Language: Japanese
- Box office: $3.2 million

Beyblade: Fierce Battle (爆転シュート ベイブレード The Movie 激闘!!タカオ VS大地, Bakuten Shūto Beiburēdo za Mūbī Gekitō!! Takao VS Daichi) is a 2002 Japanese animated action adventure film directed by Tetsuo Yasumi, based on the Beyblade manga series by Takao Aoki. It was released theatrically in Japan on August 17, 2002.

== Plot ==
The movie begins with the battle of Tyson with a boy in BBA Final Tournament of World Championships. Just as the battle ends, a mysterious boy named Daichi enters the stadium, challenging Tyson to battle with him. Tyson reluctantly agrees, and both launch their blades. On the other hand, a man named Professor Tengai takes his students to a trip in an ancient ruins where he explains to them - which are hidden dark bit beasts sealed to rest by an ancient king. Back in the fight, Tyson starts to defeat Daichi who, in rage, starts empowering his blade and a scar on his forehead lightens up. In the ancient ruins, because of that scar's mysterious light, a rock breaks to reveal a secret chamber. Daichi is defeated back at the stadium but another story has begun in the ruins. The Professor and his students enter the hidden cave in awe and reach a mysterious hall with a stone table in the middle. They reach it and suddenly the bit beast which were sealed in the walls of the hall become free and enslave the four children. They become evil and imprison the Professor because their memory is lost. Tyson soon realize throughout the movie that those dark bit beasts now want to seal the light bit beasts of the four Blade Breakers, and that those bit beasts are actually the dark versions of the four sacred bit beasts. Finally, a great battle takes place in which the Blade Breakers are victorious. The dark beasts are once again put to rest with the whole ruins collapsing in the end.

== Voice cast ==
Character	Japanese voice actor	English dubbing actor
Tyson Granger (Takao Kinomiya)	Motoko Kumai	Marlowe Gardiner-Heslin
Max Tate (Max Mizuhara)	Ai Orikasa	Gage Knox
Ray Kon (Rei Kon)	Aya Hisakawa	Daniel DeSanto
Kai Hiwatari	Urara Takano	David Reale
Kenny (Kyoujyu)	Houko Kuwashima	Alex Hood
Daichi Sumeragi	Nao Nagasawa	Mary Long
Hilary (Hiromi Tachibana)	Shiho Kikuchi	Caitriona Murphy
Steven (Satoru)	Yuko Tachibana	Craig Lauzon
Ashley (Ayaka)	Mio Takeuchi	Katie Griffin
Daniel (Shingou)	Chiharu Tezuka	Shannon Perreault
Henry (Hiroshi)	Chisa Yokoyama	Jonathan Potts
Professor Tengai	Toru Okawa	Chris Marren
Miss Kincaid (Keiko-sensei)	Aya Hisakawa	Julie Lemieux

== Release ==
Toho released the film in Japan alongside Ape Escape The Movie: Battle for the Golden Pippo Helmet on August 17, 2002. The film grossed $3,216,050 at the box office to rank as the 68th highest-grossing film in the country that year. To promote the movie, Takao Aoki drew a partial adaptation that ran in CoroCoro Comic, which was later republished in the final tankōbon of the Beyblade manga released by Shogakukan and Viz Media. VAP released the film on VHS and DVD in Japan on March 21, 2003. Takara produced movie specific tops that were released via ticket purchase campaigns, preorders for the home video release and through Beyblade blind boxes. Warner Music Japan published a 21-song soundtrack CD on August 7, 2002.

An English version, co-produced by Nelvana Limited, was released as direct-to-video by Miramax Family in North America on March 22, 2005. Citication Needed The original score was replaced with reused music from the English dub of the TV series, and the film is presented in a 1.33:1 pan and scan format, instead of the Japanese release's 1.78:1 format. The release includes a bonus featurette on the production of the English dub alongside highlights of the 2004 Beyblade World Championship. Echo Bridge Home Entertainment later reissued the DVD in 2012 and 2013. The film premiered in Canada on YTV on March 4, 2006, and in the United States on Cartoon Network on November 21, 2009.

Unlike the other Disney-era content of the Miramax library, an English version has not been reissued by Paramount Home Entertainment via Miramax Family.

It also aired in Hindi dub in India on Hungama TV.
