= Mio Takeuchi =

Japanese actress (born 1985)

- 竹内 実生
- Born: March 8, 1985 (age 40); Tokushima Prefecture, Japan
- Occupation: Actress
- Years active: 2001–2011; 2021
- Height: 155 cm (5 ft 1 in)

Mio Takeuchi (竹内 実生, Takeuchi Mio; born March 8, 1985, in Tokushima Prefecture, Japan) is a Japanese actress who is affiliated with Suns Entertainment. She played the role of Sae Taiga (Gao White) in the 2001 Super Sentai series Hyakujuu Sentai Gaoranger.

== Biography ==
In 2001, Takeuchi appeared in Hyakujuu Sentai Gaoranger as Sae Taiga/Gao White.

In 2002, she appeared in Oha Suta and other activities such as gravure and television drama. Takeuchi also had carried out activities of such as serve their leader and have formed an idol unit Strawberry with Saki Seto, in 2003 they pause their entertainment activities, and virtually retired. In 2011, she was currently working in the apparel company she was one member of a society, and sometimes face in the event that the co-star of Gaoranger Kazuyoshi Sakai like to preside over.

For background and reason for pause the entertainment activities person in question, in the 2006 issue of the magazine Toei Heroine MAX, with Takemi and Rei Saito, they talk about pressure from around to expect success in the gravure relationship after the end of Gaoranger, it has commented that they were anxious going to do in the future of entertainment life. It was also revealed that they were in the school of Este relationship at the same time.

In May 2008, Takeuchi was in charge of the moderator in the air guitar Japan tournament 1st Tokyo qualifying was held at Shinjuku Loft Plus One.

In April 2011, she appeared in 340 Presents ga hoe jūnensai.

From 2011 to 2021, She had been inactive in the entertainment industry.

After 10 years of being inactive in the entertainment industry, Takeuchi returned to the Super Sentai franchise briefly to reprise her role as Sae Taiga / Gao White in Kikai Sentai Zenkaiger vs. Hyakujuu Sentai Gaoranger Special Battle Stage alongside her fellow Gaoranger co-stars Noboru Kaneko, Kei Horie, Takeru Shibaki and Kazuyoshi Sakai.

== Filmography ==
Television
Year	Title	Role	Network	Notes
2001	Mirai Sentai Timeranger	Gao White (Voice)	TV Asahi	"Super Sentai Big Gathering (Special Compilation)"
2001–2002	Hyakujuu Sentai Gaoranger	Sae Taiga/Gao White	TV Asahi	Main role

Movies
Year	Title	Role	Notes
2001	Hyakujuu Sentai Gaoranger vs. Super Sentai	Sae Taiga/Gao White	Main role
2001	Hyakujuu Sentai Gaoranger: The Fire Mountain Roars	Sae Taiga/Gao White	Main role
2003	Ninpuu Sentai Hurricaneger vs. Gaoranger	Sae Taiga/Gao White	Main role

Stage shows
Year	Title	Role	Notes
2021	Kikai Sentai Zenkaiger vs. Hyakujuu Sentai Gaoranger Special Battle Stage	Sae Taiga/Gao White	Main role
