= Fūsen no Doratarō =

Japanese animated television series

Fūsen no Doratarō (フーセンのドラ太郎, transl: Dorataro's Balloon) is a Japanese-animated television series produced by Nippon Animation . The show was first broadcast from April 11, 1981 to August 1, 1981 on Fuji Television.

== Overview ==
Dorataro and his sister Sakura, were raised by Chuzo and his wife, who ran a dumpling shop called "Nenojiya" on Cat Island. When Dorataro grew up, he grew tired of the island's constraints and ran away from his hometown, but he returned 10 years later to the island he grew up in. There, he fell in love at first sight with Haruko, a sailor on a pleasure boat, which led to a series of troubles .。

== Characters ==
- Doratarou (ドラ太郎) - Kenichi Nagira
- Sakura (さくら) - Emiko Watanabe
- Tadazo (忠造) - Ryuji Sakachi
- Fumi (フミ) - Tomie Kataoka
- Resident (駐在) - Hiroo Oikawa
- Komakichi (駒) - Shigeru Tsuji
- Meiko (メイコ) - Mariko Mukai
- Stubborn Teacher (頑固先) - Koji Yada
- Ishi (イシ) - Seiko Nakano
- Kinuyo (絹代) - Taeko Nakanishi
- Haruko (春子) - Tamagawa Sakiko

== Episode list ==
Episode	Date	Episode title	Script	Director
1	1981 April 11	Dora taro returns to his hometown(ドラ太郎・故郷へ帰る)	高野丈邦 楠葉宏三	小川隆雄
2	April 18	Dora-taro enjoys cherry blossom viewing (ドラ太郎・花見を楽しむ)	千葉茂樹	古佐小吉重
3	April 25	ドラ太郎・兄貴と呼ばれる	中村宏	小川隆雄
4	May 2	ドラ太郎・春風を呼ぶ	千葉茂樹	小川隆雄
5	May 30	ドラ太郎・子守唄をうたう	杉山卓	小川隆雄
6	June 6	ドラ太郎・涙の鯉のぼり	中野顕彰	小川隆雄
7	June 13	ドラ太郎・大志をいだく	神山槐三	小川隆雄
8	6月20日	ドラ太郎・さくらの誕生日を祝う	神山槐三	竹内留吉
9	6月27日	ドラ太郎・夜空に故郷を想う	神山槐三	小川隆雄
10	7月11日	ドラ太郎・荒波にのまれる	中野顕彰	鈴木満
11	7月18日	ドラ太郎・まごころの相合い傘	胡桃哲	大坂竹志
12	7月25日	ドラ太郎・夫婦ちゃわんを買う	中野顕彰	小川隆雄
13	8月1日	ドラ太郎・親孝行をする	中野顕彰	小川隆雄
