= Nippon Animation =

Japanese animation studio

Nippon Animation Co., Ltd.
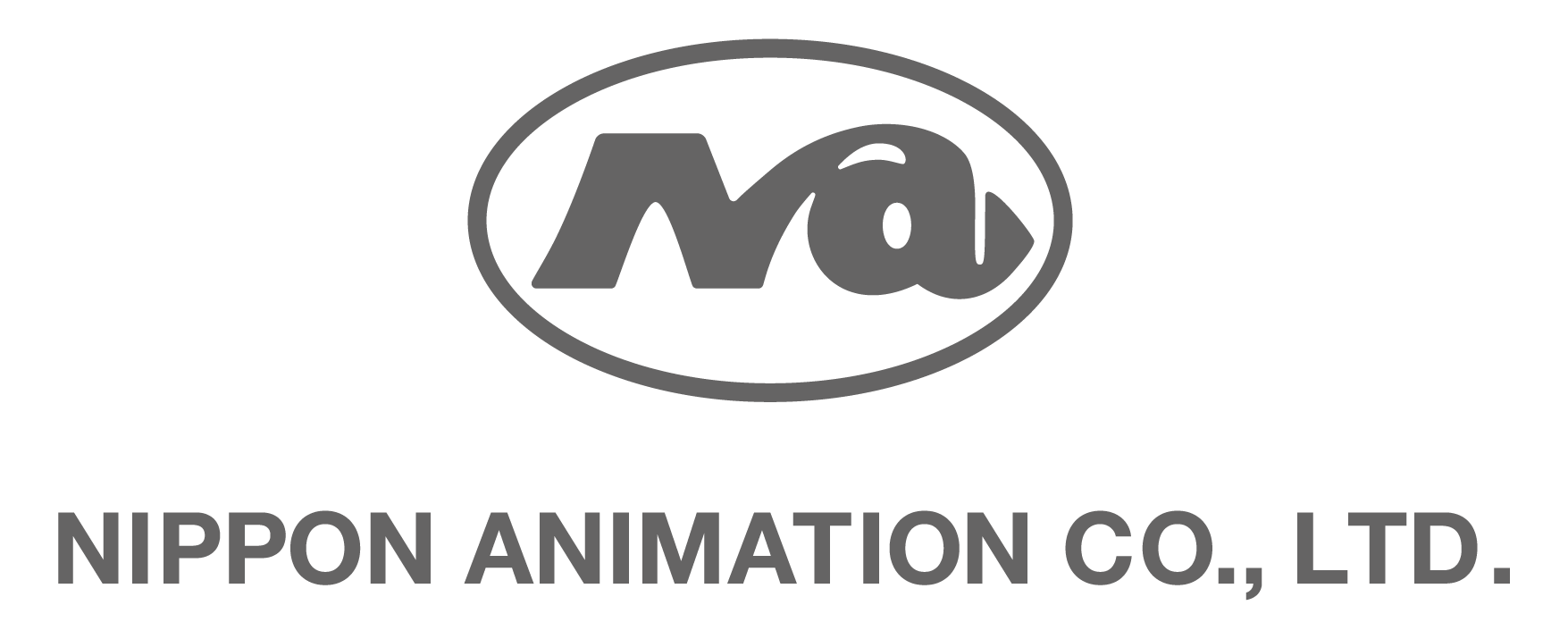

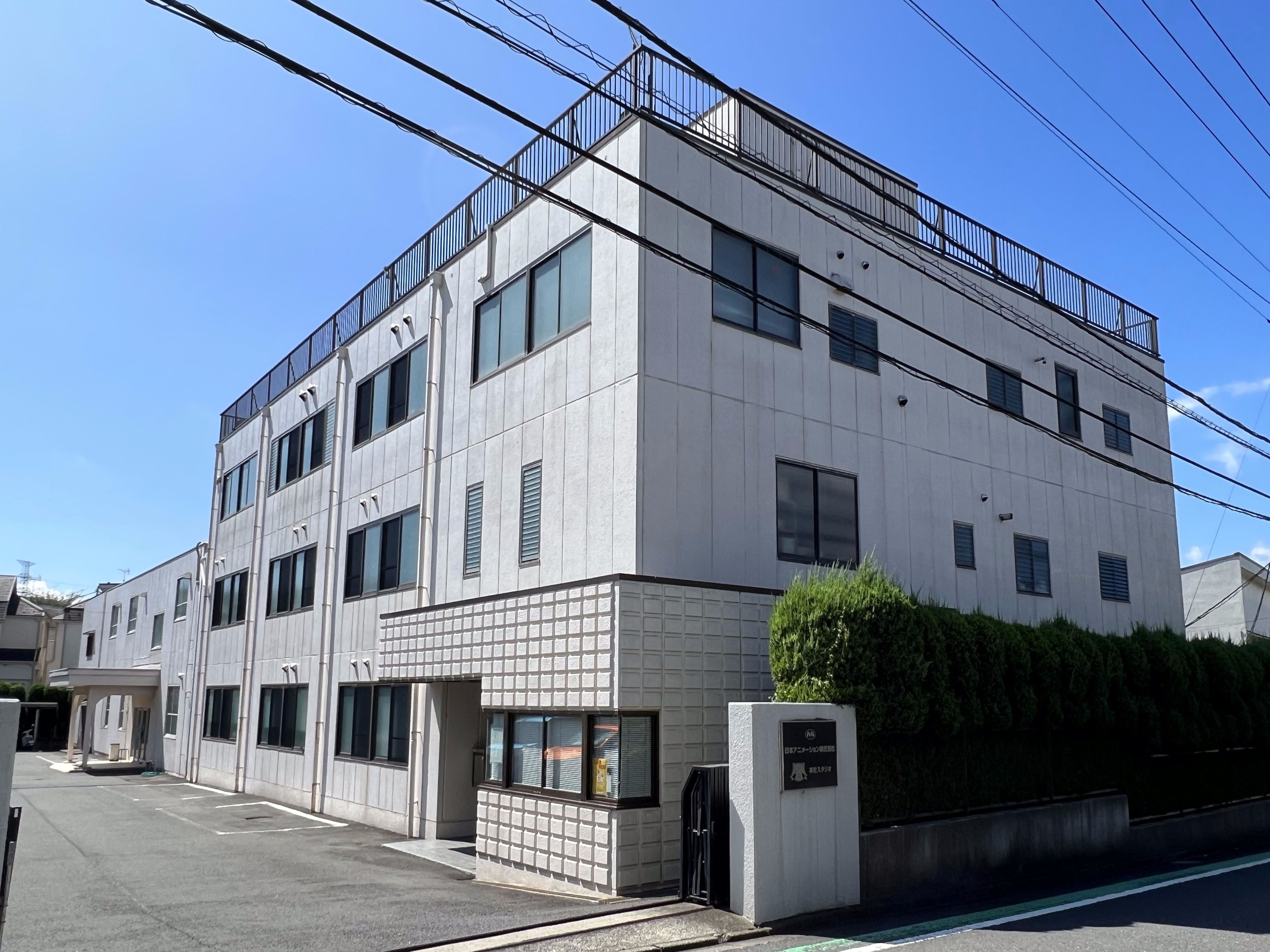
- Headquarters in Tama, Tokyo, Japan
- Native name: 日本アニメーション株式会社
- Romanized name: Nippon Animēshon Kabushiki-gaisha
- Type: Kabushiki gaisha
- Industry: Japanese animation; Licensing
- Predecessor: Zuiyō Eizō
- Founded: June 3, 1975; 51 years ago
- Founder: Kōichi Motohashi
- Headquarters: Wada, Tama, Tokyo (Note: Headquarters and studio), Japan
- Number of locations: Ginza, Chūō, Tokyo (Note: Administrative office), Japan
- Key people: Kazuko Ishikawa (president)
- Number of employees: 76 (as of July 2025)
- Subsidiaries: Nippon Animation International; Nippon Anime Licensing; Nippon Anime Ongaku Shupan; Janime.com; Sun Onkyo
- Website: www.nippon-animation.co.jp; www.nipponanimation.com
- Footnotes; Full member of the Association of Japanese Animations.

Nippon Animation Co., Ltd. (Note: Japanese: 日本アニメーション株式会社, Hepburn: Nippon Animēshon Kabushiki-gaisha) is a Japanese animation studio founded on June 3, 1975. The company is headquartered in Tokyo, with its headquarters in their Tama City studio and an administrative head office in the Ginza district of Chūō.

Nippon Animation is known for producing numerous anime series adapted from works of Western literature as well as original works and manga adaptations such as the World Masterpiece Theater series with entries such as Rascal the Raccoon, Anne of Green Gables, The Adventures of Tom Sawyer, Tales of Little Women, Romeo's Blue Skies among others as well as Maya the Bee, Papuwa, Uchūsen Sagittarius and Chibi Maruko-chan which has become a major hit for the studio in Japan and globally. Amongst many of its past and present staffers include Hayao Miyazaki and Isao Takahata, co-founders of Studio Ghibli. Aside from animation production, the company also handles character licensing.

The titular protagonist from Rascal the Raccoon serves as the studio's mascot.

== History ==
=== Early history (as Zuiyo Eizo) ===
What is now Nippon Animation is descended from Zuiyo Eizo (or Zuiyo Enterprise), an animation studio and planning and production company founded in April 1969 by TCJ former manager Shigeto Takahashi.

Zuiyo Enterprise (瑞鷹エンタープライズ, Zuiyō Entrāpraizu) was the former sales division of the animation studio, TCJ before it spun off in March and was formally established the following month.

The studio has been involved in the planning and production series based on Western literature in the early and mid-1970s such as Moomin, Vicky the Viking and 1974's Heidi, Girl of the Alps, an adaptation of Johanna Spyri's popular children's book Heidi. The Heidi anime was enormously popular in Japan (and later in Europe, and the feature-length edit of the TV series saw a U.S. VHS release in 1985). Zuiyo Enterprise soon found itself in financial trouble because of the high production costs of a series (presumably Maya the Honey Bee) it was attempting to sell to the European market.

The company was involved in the production of animated series for the TV anime staple Calpis Comic Theater (カルピスまんが劇場, Karupisu manga gekijō), later known as World Masterpiece Theater, broadcast on Fuji TV. These series were based on children's literature such as Moomin and Andersen Stories. These earlier series' animation were commissioned to two other studios: Mushi Production and Tokyo Movie Shinsha, while Zuiyo was mainly involved in the planning.

In 1972, after changing its headquarters, Zuiyo Enterprise formed an animation studio division known as Zuiyo Eizo (ズイヨー映像, Zuiyō Eizō). By this time, Zuiyo was working on its first independent production based on Johanna Spyri's Heidi, an ambitious project on which Isao Takahata and Hayao Miyazaki also worked on. In 1967 Takahashi had already produced a short pilot for a Heidi series with TCJ, but the project was shelved. In the meantime Zuiyo also worked on Vicky the Viking, a German co-production with ZDF and ORF, based on Runer Jonsson's eponymous book series. In 1974 Heidi, Girl of the Alps and Vicky the Viking were broadcast in Japan, soon gaining a huge success also in Europe. Nevertheless, Zuiyo Eizo found itself in financial difficulties due to the high production costs of its series, not enough repaid by the selling of its properties to European market. In 1975, Zuiyo Eizo was split into two entities: Zuiyo Co., Ltd., which absorbed the debt and the rights to the Heidi anime and other previous series, and Nippon Animation, which was essentially Zuiyo Eizo's production staff (including Miyazaki and Takahata), which would continue to produce World Masterpiece Theater, retaining the rights of other series on which the studio was working on, such as A Dog of Flanders and Maya the Honey Bee.

=== Modern History (as Nippon Animation) ===
In 1975, Zuiyo Eizo's staff spun off its studio into a separate company known as Nippon Animation, which was essentially Zuiyo Eizo's production staff (including Miyazaki and Takahata). Officially, Nippon Animation Co., Ltd. was established on 3 June 1975 by company president Kōichi Motohashi. The newly rechristened Nippon Animation found success right away with Maya the Honey Bee and A Dog of Flanders (both of which began as Zuiyō Eizō productions), which became the first entry in the World Masterpiece Theater series to be produced under the Nippon Animation name. Hayao Miyazaki left Nippon Animation in 1979 in the middle of the production of Anne of Green Gables to make the Lupin III feature The Castle of Cagliostro. As a result, Zuiyo Enterprise absorbed the debt and the rights to the Heidi and Vicky the Viking television series and continued operations until 1988, when due to its debt, the copyrights for the Zuiyo Enterprise programs moved to a separate company under the Zuiyo name.

A lawsuit by 361 voice actors was filed against Nippon Animation and its recording production subsidiary Onkyo Eizo System in demand of unpaid royalties from DVD releases of the studio's series. After four years, a judge ruled in 2003 that Onkyo Eizo owed 87 million yen (US$796,000) to the actors, but dismissed the case against Nippon Animation as they deemed actor compensation to be the responsibility of the recording studio. Both parties appealed the decision. On 25 August 2004, the Tokyo High Court upheld the ruling against Onkyo Eizo and also found Nippon Animation liable, ordering both companies to pay the 87 million yen. The Supreme Court of Japan upheld the ruling in 2005.

== Body of work ==
In addition to the World Masterpiece Theater series, Nippon Animation has also produced many other series based on Western works of literature, as well as original works and adaptations of Japanese manga. Especially, until Jeanie with the Light Brown Hair (1992), its peak of productions based on Western works of literature. Many of these are included in the list of the studio's works below.

Of the studio's productions not based on Western literature, the most popular is undoubtedly Chibi Maruko-chan (1990) and its 1995 revival, based on the popular manga by Momoko Sakura. At its peak, this slice-of-life anime about an unusually intelligent elementary-school-aged girl and her family and friends managed an audience rating of nearly 40%, making it one of the highest-rated anime series ever (and the highest-rated anime program in Japanese history at the time).

== Works adapted from Western literature ==
=== Other TV series ===
- Vicky the Viking (小さなバイキング ビッケ, Chiisana Viking Vikke) – 1974–1975 (eps. 53-78, property of Zuiyo Eizo)
- Maya the Honey Bee (みつばちマーヤの冒険, Mitsubachi Māya no Bōken) – 1975–1976 (began as Zuiyo Eizo production)
- Laura, The Prairie Girl (草原の少女ローラ, Sōgen no shōjo Rōra (Laura, Girl of the Prairies)) – 1975
- Arabian Nights: Sinbad's Adventures (Arabian Naitsu: Shinbaddo No Bôken) – 1975
- The Adventures of Piccolino (Pikorīno no Bōken) – 1976
- Little Lulu and Her Little Friends (Little Lulu to Chicchai Nakama) – 1976
- Monarch: The Big Bear of Tallac (Kuma no Ko Jacky) – 1977
- Future Boy Conan (Mirai Shonen Conan) – 1978, a Hayao Miyazaki work
- Bannertail: The Story of Gray Squirrel – 1979
- Ruy, the Little Cid (Little El Cid no Bouken) – 1980, co-production with BRB Internacional
- Heart (Cuore): An Italian Schoolboy's Journal (Ai no Gakko Cuore Monogatari) – 1981
- Dogtanian and the Three Muskehounds (Wanwan Sanjushi, The Three Musketeers) – 1981; co-production with BRB Internacional (Madrid, Spain)
- The New Adventures of Maya the Bee (Shin Mitsubachi Maaya no Boken) – 1982
- Alice's Adventures in Wonderland (Fushigi no Kuni no Arisu) – 1983
- Around the World with Willy Fog (Anime 80 Sekai Isshu) – 1983 (In Spain), 1987 (In Japan); co-production with BRB Internacional
- Manga Aesop's Fables – 1983
- Bosco Adventure (Bosco Daiboken) – 1986
- Grimm's Fairy Tale Classics (Grimm Meisaku Gekijo) – 1987–1988
- New Grimm's Fairy Tale Classics (Shin Grimm Meisaku Gekijo) – 1988–1989
- Jungle Book Shōnen Mowgli (2 October 1989 – 29 October 1990)
- Jeanie with the Light Brown Hair (Kaze no Naka no Shojo Kinptasu no Jeannie) – 1992

=== TV specials ===
- Manxmouse (Tondemo Nezumi Daikatsuyaku) (30 June 1979)
- Anne's Diary: The Story of Anne Frank (Anne no Nikki: Anne Frank Monogatari) (28 September 1979)
- Back to the Forest (Nodoka Mori no Dobutsu Daisakusen, English titles: Peter of Placid Forest, Back to the Forest) (3 February 1980)
- The Story of Fifteen Boys (Hitomi no Naka no Shonen Jugo Shonen Hyoryuki) (19 October 1987)

== Other works ==
=== TV series ===
- Dokaben (6 October 1976 – 26 December 1979)
- Attack on Tomorrow (4 April 1977 – 5 September 1977)
- Blocker Gundan 4 Machine Blaster – 1977 (co-production with Ashi Productions)
- Ginguiser (Chogattai Majutsu Robot Ginguiser) (co-production with Ashi Productions) – 1977
- I'm Teppei (Ore wa Teppei) – 1977
- Charlotte (Wakakusa no Charlotte) – 1977
- The Casebook of Charlotte Holmes (Angie Girl, Jouo Heika no Petite Angie) – 1977
- Poetry of the Baseball Enthusiasts (Yakyū-kyō no Uta) (23 December 1977 – 26 March 1979)
- Haikara-san ga Tōru (Smart-san, Mademoiselle Anne) – 1978
- Highschool Baseball Ninja (Ikkyu-san) – 1978
- Misha the Bear Cub (Koguma no Misha) – 1979
- Sanpei the Fisherman (Fisherman Sanpei) – 1980
- Dora-tarō's Balloon - 1981
- Fútbol en acción – 1981 (co-production with Estudio Equip, BRB Internacional and Televisión Española)
- The Many Dream Journeys of Meme – 1983
- Noozles (Fushigi na Koara Burinkii, Blinky and Pinky) – 1984
- Elves of the Forest (Mori no Tonto Tachi) – 1984 (co-production with Shaft)
- Bumpety Boo (Hey! Bumboo) – 1985
- Spaceship Sagittarius (Uchuusen Sagittarius) – 1986
- Animated Classics of Japanese Literature (Seishun Anime Zenshū) (25 April 1986 – 26 December 1986)
- Topo Gigio – 1988
- Dagon in the Land of Weeds – 1988
- Chibi Maruko-chan – 1990
- Pygmalio – 1990
- Top Striker (Moero! Top Striker) – 1991
- Christopher Columbus – 1992 (co-production with Mondo TV)
- Mikan's Picture Diary (Mikan Enikki) – 1992
- Papuwa-kun (Nangoku Shonen Papuwa-kun) – 1992
- Bow: Modern Dog Tales (Heisei Inu Monogatari Bau) (14 October 1993 – 22 September 1994)
- Dragon League – 1993
- Muka Muka Paradise – 1993
- Miracle Girls – 1993 (as Japan Taps)
- Mahojin Guru Guru – 1994
- Pig Girl of Love and Courage: Tonde Burin – 1994
- Yamato Takeru – 1994
- Romeo's Blue Skies – 1995
- Mama Loves the Poyopoyo-Saurus – 1995
- Grander Musashi – 1997
- Duck Caen – 1997
- Cooking Master Boy (Chūka Ichiban!) – 1997
- Coji-Coji (Sakura Momoko Gekijo: Koji-Koji) – 1997; from the creator of Chibi Maruko-chan, Momoko Sakura
- Ten-Ten-Kun (Hanasaki Tenshi Ten-Ten-kun) – 1998
- Inventor Boy Kanipan (Hatsumei Boy Kanipan) – 1998
- Xenon Football Sign – 1999
- Shuukan! Story Land – 1999
- Hunter × Hunter – 1999
- Corrector Yui – 1999
- Bikkuriman 2000 – 1999
- Taiga Adventure (Mirai Shonen Conan II: Taiga no Daiboken) – 1999; a remake of Future Boy Conan directed by Hayao Miyazaki's former assistant, Keiji Hayakawa, but featuring a new cast of characters
- Marcelino Pan y Vino – 2000 (Japan-Spain co-production; title is Spanish for "Marcelino, bread and wine")
- Mahōjin Guru Guru – April 2000, TV Tokyo
- Princess Comet (Cosmic Baton Girl Comet-san) – 2001; based on a manga by Mitsuteru Yokoyama, creator of Tetsujin 28-go and Sally, the Witch
- Dennou Boukenki Webdiver – 2001 (co-production with Radix)
- Daigunder – 2002 (co-production with Brains Base)
- Hungry Heart: Wild Striker – 2002–2003, Animax
- Papuwa – September 2003, TV Tokyo
- Sore Ike! Zukkoke Sannin Gumi – April 2004, TV Tokyo
- Fantastic Children – October 2004, TV Tokyo
- Pokapoka Mori no Rascal – 2006, remake of Rascal the Raccoon
- Yamato Nadeshiko Shichi Henge – 2006
- Antique Bakery – 2008
- Hyakko – 2008
- Meitantei Rascal – 2014, spin-off of Rascal the Raccoon
- Genie Family 2020 – 2020 (co-production with Tatsunoko Production)
- Let's Make a Mug Too – 2021
- Love All Play – 2022 (co-production with OLM)
- Blue Orchestra – 2023–2026
- Araiguma Calcal-dan – 2025, second spin-off of Rascal the Raccoon
- Omae, Tanuki ni Naranē ka? – TBA

=== Films ===
- Future Boy Conan (Mirai Shōnen Konan) (15 September 1979)
- Yakyū-kyō no Uta: Kita no Ōkami Minami no Tora (15 September 1979)
- 3000 Leagues in Search of Mother (19 July 1980)
- Future Boy Conan: The Revival of the Giant Machine (Mirai Shōnen Konan: Tokubetsu Hen-Kyodaiki Gigant no Fukkatsu) (11 March 1984)
- Locke the Superman (Chōjin Rokku) (14 April 1984)
- Chibi Maruko-chan (15 December 1990)
- Chibi Maruko-chan: Watashi no Suki na Uta (19 December 1992)
- Tottoi (AKA "Secret of the Seal") (22 August 1992)
- Heisei Inu Monogatari Bau: Genshi Inu Monogatari Bau (20 August 1994) – short film
- Mahōjin Guru Guru – (20 April 1996) – short film
- Violinist of Hameln (20 April 1996) – short film
- The Dog of Flanders: The Movie (15 March 1997)
- Marco: 3000 Leagues in Search of Mother (2 April 1999)
- Tensai Bakavon: Yomigaeru Flanders no Inu (23 May 2015)
- Sinbad: Sora Tobu Hime to Himitsu no Shima – 2015
- Chibi Maruko-chan: A Boy from Italy – 2015
- Haikara-San: Here Comes Miss Modern – 2017–18

=== TV specials ===
- King Fang (Oyuki Yama no Yuusha Haou) (23 September 1978)
- Our Hit and Run (18 February 1979)
- Preface Taro (Maegami Taro) (29 April 1979)
- Coral Reef Legend: Elfie of the Blue Sea (Sango-shō Densetsu: Aoi Umi no Elfie) (22 August 1986)
- On-chan, Dream Power Big Adventure! (5 August 2003)
- Miyori's Forest (Miyori no Mori) (25 August 2007)

=== Original video animations ===
- Locke the Superman: Lord Leon – 1989
- Bucchigiri – 1989
- Bucchigiri 2 – 1990
- Bucchigiri 3 – 1991
- Locke the Superman: New World Command – 1991
- Bucchigiri 4 – 1991
- Jungle Wars – 1991
- Boku wa Ō-sama – 1996
- Hunter x Hunter – 2002
- Shiritsu Araiso Koutougakkou Seitokai Shikkoubu – 2002
- Hunter x Hunter: Greed Island – 2003
- Pink Crayons – 2004
- Hunter x Hunter: G.I. Final – 2004
- Resident Evil 4: Resident Evil Masterpiece Theater: Leon and the Mysterious Village – 2023

== Nippon Animedia ==
It was a subsidiary of Nippon Animation.

Works

- 2002: Beyblade: V-Force (TV)
- 2002: Beyblade: Fierce Battle (film)
- 2003: Beyblade G Revolution (TV)
- 2004: Battle B-Daman (TV)
- 2005: Battle B-Daman: Fire Spirits (TV)
- 2005: Mix Master (TV) – co-production with Sunwoo Entertainment
- 2007: Zero Duel Masters (TV) – with SynergySP
- 2007: Duel Masters Zero (TV)
- 2008: Ikuze! Gen-san (ONA)
