= Anne no Nikki: Anne Frank Monogatari =

1979 Japanese anime film

- Genre: Drama, biographical film
- Anime television film
- Directed by: Eiji Okabe
- Produced by: Yoshihiro Ōba
- Written by: Ryūzō Nakanishi
- Music by: Kōichi Sakata
- Studio: Nippon Animation
- Original network: ANN (ABC, TV Asahi)
- Released: 28 September 1979
- Runtime: 82 minutes

Anne no Nikki: Anne Frank Monogatari (アンネの日記 アンネ·フランク物語, Anne no nikki: Anne Furanku monogatari; lit. "Anne's Diary: The Story of Anne Frank"), is a 1979 Japanese anime television film directed by Eiji Okabe. The film is also sometime listed as Anne Frank Monogatari: Anne no Nikki to Douwa yori (アンネ・フランク物語 -アンネの日記と童話より- lit. "The Story of Anne Frank - From Anne's Diary and Fairy Tales-").

The film is notable for being the first animated adaptation of Anne Frank's The Diary of a Young Girl (1942–1944) and was co-produced by Nippon Animation and Asahi Broadcasting Corporation to commemorate Anne's 50th birthday. The film uses four of Anne's short fantasy stories as interludes to her confinement. It also features an interview with Anne's father Otto Frank, and real live action footage from Nazi concentration camps and Netherlands landscapes. It aired on TV Asahi on 28 September 1979. It is said to have started the subgenre of child-focused anime about war such as Barefoot Gen and Grave of the Fireflies. The film is currently unavailable, having never been re-broadcast or released to home video.

== Plot ==
The story follows the life of a 13-year-old jewish girl named Anne Frank, hiding with her family and some friends in an Amsterdam attic to escape the Nazis during World War II.

== Cast ==
Character	Japanese voice actor
Anne Frank	Mariko Fuji
Margot Frank	Miyuki Ueda
Edith Frank	Noriko Nakamura
Otto Frank	Tooru Abe
Hermann Van Daan	Kōichi Kitamura
Petronella Van Daan	Hisako Kyouda
Peter Van Daan	Katsuji Mori
Miep Gies	Saiko Egawa
Albert Düssel	Eisuke Yoda
Narrator	Fumie Kashiyama

== Music ==
Opening theme

- "There is a Tomorrow with Love" (愛がある明日がある, Ai ga aru ashitagāru)

Sung by Seagulls, lyrics by Tokiko Iwatani, music and arrangement by Kōichi Sakata.

Ending theme

- "The Girl who Became a Seagull" (かもめになった少女, Kamome ni natta shōjo)

Sung by Seagulls, lyrics by Tokiko Iwatani, music and arrangement by Kōichi Sakata.

== See also ==
- List of animated feature films
