= Yukio Yamagata =

Japanese singer and actor (1957–2026)

Yukio Yamagata 山形 ユキオ

Background information
- Born: March 11, 1957; Wakamatsu, Fukuoka, Japan
- Died: November, 2026 (aged 69)
- Genres: J-Rock, Anison
- Years active: 1979–2026
- Label: King Records
- Formerly of: TUSH

Yukio Yamagata (山形 ユキオ, Yamagata Yukio; March 11, 1957 – November 2026) was a Japanese singer, actor and voice actor.

== Early life ==
Yamagata was born in Wakamatsu, Fukuoka, but moved to Hiroshima during his second year of Junior high school. Although he had played soccer at his previous school, he had started playing baseball due to there being no soccer team. He had wanted to be a professional baseball player, although he had quit in senior year due to frustration.

During senior year, he had auditioned for a television music program, but was rejected. Wanting to be a singer, he later moved to Tokyo after school, and studied at Tokyo College of Music. After graduating, he joined the rock group TUSH and performed at an American military camp in Yokosuka for one year.

== Career ==
In 1981, Yamagata performed the opening for the anime series Yattodetaman with TUSH, which launched his career into singing for multiple anime and tokusatsu series.

In 1982, Yamagata, alongside Satoru Sakabe, sang the opening theme for the anime series Galactic Gale Baxingar. In 1996, he performed the opening for Let's & Go!!, and in 2001, performed the opening for the tokusatsu series Hyakujuu Sentai Gaoranger.

In 1984, Yamagata joined 81 Produce and started performing in theater productions. He made his debut with the show Fly! Keihin Dracula.

== Death ==
On November 7, 2026, Yamagata was to perform at the Super Sentai Soul XX 2026 concert in Tokyo, however, was not able to appear due to an illness.

On November 16, nine days later, BIRTHDAY SONG, the planning company for the concert, had announced that he had died days after the concert. The day of death and cause were not revealed. A private funeral was held among family members.

== Discography ==
=== Albums ===
- Twilight Shadow (1984)

=== Singles ===
- Acrobunch: The Legend Of The Demon Lands (1982)
- Abayo Fly Bye / Kamen Kamen (1982)
- Galactic Gale Baxingar (1982)
- Time Shadow ~Sugata Naku, Oto mo Naku~ (June 21, 2000)
- Burn, Super Sentai Spirit! (September 21, 2001)

=== Insert songs ===
- Saikyou! Super GalaxyMega (Denji Sentai Megaranger)
- Misetsukero Seiju Damashii! (Seiju Sentai Gingaman)
- Juusouken! Seigi Yo Kagayake (Seiju Sentai Gingaman)
- Kinkyuu Gattai! Victory Robo (KyuKyu Sentai GoGoFive)
- Time Shadow ~Sugata Naku, Oto mo Naku~ (Mirai Sentai Timeranger)
- Kakusei! V-Rex Robo!! (Mirai Sentai Timeranger)
- Gaoranger Hoero!! (Hyakujuu Sentai Gaoranger)
- Sono Tsubasa De... (Hyakujuu Sentai Gaoranger)
- HOT! HOT! GaoMuscle!! (Hyakujuu Sentai Gaoranger)
- Kizuna ~Spirit of Gaoranger~ (Hyakujuu Sentai Gaoranger)
- Buster Machine, Hasshin se yo! (Tokumei Sentai Go-Busters)
- Doubutsu Sentai Go-Busters (Tokumei Sentai Go-Busters Returns vs. Doubutsu Sentai Go-Busters)
- Akibaranger Season Tsuu! (Hikonin Sentai Akibaranger)
- Super Sentai☆Hikonin Ouenka (Hikonin Sentai Akibaranger)
- ToQ Sou Shingeki!!! (Ressha Sentai ToQger)
- Chozetsu Lion Ha-Oh (Shuriken Sentai Ninninger)
- Death Death Deathgalien (Doubutsu Sentai Zyuohger)
- NEVER GIVE UP! Super ZenkaiOh Juran (Kikai Sentai Zenkaiger)

== Filmography ==
Year	Series	Role	Notes
2001	Hyakujuu Sentai Gaoranger	Ayanosuke Yajima	Cameo in Episode 6
2012	Hikonin Sentai Akibaranger	Himself	Cameo in Season 1, Episode 9 and Season 2, Episode 3
2015	Shuriken Sentai Nininnger	Shishi-Oh	
