= Mīmu Iro Iro Yume no Tabi =

Japanese anime television series

- Screenshot of the TV series displaying Meme on the keyboard
- ミームいろいろ夢の旅
- Genre: Drama, adventure, science fiction, educational
- Written by: Akira Nakahara; Hiroshi Ootsuka; Kensyo Nakano; Naoko Miyake; Nobuyuki Isshiki; Shōzō Matsuda; Toshiyuki Kashiwakura; Yoshihisa Araki; Yoshio Kuroda
- Directed by: Kazuyoshi Yokota
- Music by: Takeo Watanabe
- Country of origin: Japan
- Original language: Japanese
- No. of episodes: 127

Production
- Producers: Masashi Tadakuma; Shoji Sato; Takaji Matsudo
- Production companies: Nippon Animation; TBS

Original release
- Network: JNN (TBS)
- Release: April 3, 1983 – September 29, 1985

The Many Dream Journeys of Meme (ミームいろいろ夢の旅, Miimu Iro Iro Yume no Tabi; also translated as Mimu, the Traveller of Many Dreams and Discoveries Unlimited) is a Japanese anime television series created by Nippon Animation. The show originally aired from 1983 to 1985 and was primarily educational. Episodes usually dealt with scientific discoveries and inventions, though there were also a few futuristic and science fiction stories and situations.

== Content ==
Episodes are 30 minutes long and generally present an important discovery in the history of sciences.

=== Notable persons presented in the show ===
- Albert Einstein
- Alexander Fleming
- Alexander Graham Bell
- Alfred Wegener
- Charles Darwin
- Galileo Galilei
- George Stephenson
- Isaac Newton
- James Watt
- Jean-Henri Fabre
- Jean-François Champollion
- Johannes Kepler
- Louis Pasteur
- Nicéphore Niépce
- Thomas Edison
- Wright brothers

== International broadcast ==
The series has been translated into many languages, including Spanish (as Los mil viajes en los sueños de Mimi), French (as Ordy ou les Grandes Découvertes), Portuguese (as Descobertas sem limite), Vietnamese (as Ordy - Những phát kiến vĩ đại); Dimi Following the great discoveries or Dimi Be'Iqvot HaTagliot HaGdolot), Arabic (as اسألوا لبيبة; Ask Labeebah or Is'aloo Labeebah), Serbo-Croatian (as Otkrića bez granica; Discoveries without limits), Macedonian (as Откритија без граници), Persian (as "ماجراهای دانی‌"; Adventure of Dani), Dutch (as Eindeloze Ontdekkingen) and Cantonese (as 小豆丁).
