= Bow (manga) =

Japanese manga series

- First tankōbon volume cover

バウ (Bau)
- Genre: Comedy
- Manga
- Written by: Terry Yamamoto
- Published by: Shogakukan
- Magazine: Big Comic Superior
- Original run: May 1992 – November 1999
- Volumes: 11
- Anime television series
- Directed by: Takeshi Kaga
- Produced by: Kenji Ota (TV Asahi); Yasuyuki Watanabe (DIK); Shigeo Endo
- Music by: Toshiyuki Watanabe
- Studio: Nippon Animation
- Original network: ANN (TV Asahi)
- Original run: October 14, 1993 – September 22, 1994
- Episodes: 40 (80 segments)
- Video game

Heisei Inu Monogatari Bow Pop'n Smash!!
- Publisher: Takara
- Platform: Super Famicom
- Released: April 28, 1994
- Anime film

Heisei Inu Monogatari Bow Genshi Inu Monogatari Bow
- Directed by: Takeshi Kaga
- Studio: Nippon Animation
- Released: August 20, 1994
- Runtime: 22 minutes
- icon

Bow (Japanese: バウ, Hepburn: Bau), also known as Bow Wow, is a Japanese manga series written and illustrated by Terry Yamamoto. It was serialized in Shogakukan's seinen manga magazine Big Comic Superior from 1992 to 1999, with its chapters collected in 11 tankōbon volumes. A 40-episode anime television series adaptation by Nippon Animation was broadcast on TV Asahi from 1993 to 1994; a short film was also released in 1994.

== Synopsis ==
The series follows Bow, a Bull Terrier that, starting out as a stray dog, lounges in with a struggling manga artist for a while before being adopted by Sayaka, a third grader and the daughter of a yakuza family. Initially the father is unwilling to take the dog in, especially as he is extremely accident-prone, but changes his mind after Bow saves the life of his gang's boss.

The rest of the story follows Bow's mishaps with Sayaka, her family (particularly her father, who shares an antagonistic relationship with him) and pets, along with the rest of the neighborhood.

== Media ==
=== Manga ===
Written and illustrated by Terry Yamamoto, Bow was serialized in Shogakukan's seinen manga magazine Big Comic Superior from May 1992 to November 1999. Shogakukan collected its chapters in 11 tankōbon volumes, released from March 30, 1993, to March 30, 2000.

=== Anime ===
A 40-episode anime television series (containing two segments each), titled Heisei Inu Monogatari Bow (平成イヌ物語バウ, Heisei Inu Monogatari Bau; lit. 'The Heisei Dog Story: Bow'), was broadcast on TV Asahi from October 14, 1993, to September 22, 1994. Lindberg performed the opening theme song, "Daikirai!" (大キライ!; lit. 'I Really Hate It!'), and the first ending theme "Futarikiri de Ikōyo" (二人きりで行こうよ; lit. 'Let's Go, Just the Two of Us'); the second ending theme is "Nengara Noutenki" (年がらノー天気; lit. 'Carefree All Year Round'), performed by Ed Yamaguchi and Bow.

A 22-minute film, titled Heisei Inu Monogatari Bow: Genshi Inu Monogatari Bow (平成イヌ物語バウ 原始イヌ物語バウ, Heisei Inu Monogatari Bau Genshi Inu Monogatari Bau) was released by Toei Company on August 20, 1994.

=== Video game ===
A video game developed by Takara, titled Heisei Inu Monogatari Bow Pop'n Smash!! (平成イヌ物語バウ ポップンスマッシュ!!, Heisei Inu Monogatari Bau Poppun Sumasshu!!) was released in Japan for the Super Famicom on April 28, 1994.
