= Uchūsen Sagittarius =

Japanese anime television series

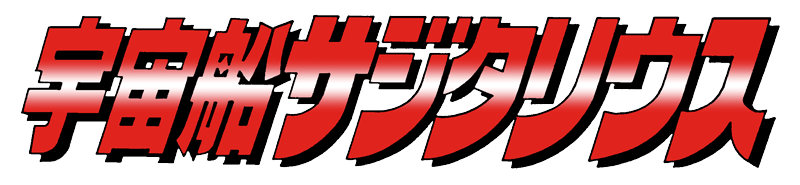
- 宇宙船サジタリウス
- Genre: Science fiction, comedy, adventure
- Based on: Altri Mondi by Andrea Romoli
- Directed by: Kazuyoshi Yokota
- Music by: Haruki Mino
- Country of origin: Japan
- Original language: Japanese
- No. of episodes: 77

Production
- Executive producer: Koichi Motohashi
- Producers: Kyōzō Utsunomiya (TV Asahi); Takaji Matsudo (Nippon Animation)
- Production companies: TV Asahi; Nippon Animation

Original release
- Network: ANN (TV Asahi)
- Release: January 10, 1986 – October 3, 1987

Uchūsen Sagittarius (宇宙船サジタリウス, Uchūsen Sajitariusu; lit. Spaceship Sagittarius) is a 77-episode Japanese science fiction anime television series directed by Kazuyoshi Yokota and created by Nippon Animation and TV Asahi. It aired between January 10, 1986, and October 3, 1987. The series is based on comics created by Italian physicist Andrea Romoli. The series was a huge success in Japan and even won the Osamu Tezuka's Atom Award at the Tokyo Film Festival.

== Story ==
The series depicts the adventures of four astronauts who travel through space and visit many planets. On each planet they have an adventure. Each adventure seems to have a moral, such as the value of friendship or the protection of endangered species.

== Setting ==
The series takes place in a seemingly not so distant future. The world greatly resembles the world of the late 20th century, but there is a considerable amount of futuristic technology: interstellar travel is common place (the spatial agency which employs the characters is a modest private agency not related to the government), laser weapons exist, etc. There isn't any mention of the Internet (the series was created before the internet became really common) and the characters use outdated technology such as floppy disks (instead of CDs or DVDs) for data storage.

At the beginning of the series the characters are mostly on Earth, but as the series progress the characters travel through space on board of their spaceship called "The Sagittarius". The characters visit many planets on which they have many adventures. Although the Sagittarius is an old spaceship which uses a sort of oil as fuel, the spaceship is able to leave Earth and reach planets sometimes in as little time as a few hours. The characters do not require artificial respiratory systems and are able to breathe on each of the planets which they visit.

== Themes ==
The show was full of humor, but it also incorporated dark and mature themes. Many episodes talked about subjects such as: friendship, war in general, the danger of nuclear warfare or nuclear explosion (Japan was the victim of the atomic bombings of Hiroshima and Nagasaki), protection of the environment and of endangered species, slavery (Sebeep was the personal singer of a taxidermist in one episode), alcoholism (there was an adventure in which Tope had become an alcoholic and abandoned his family), pirates, virtual reality (in one adventure there was a complete world which was an illusion entirely controlled by a computer). the series also doesn't shy away from the harsh reality of adult life as it tackles themes of financial stability, the work force, work culture (which could be seen as a critique to the Japanese work culture.)

== Characters ==
Members of the team. From left to right: Toppy, Rana, Sebeep, Giraffe, and Anne. In the background is the spaceship Sagittarius.

=== Main characters ===
Tope (トッピー, Toppī)
Voiced by: Bin Shimada

Toppy is the leader of the group. He is a young father with a wife and a baby daughter. He is usually the group's strategist and gives instructions to his crew. He is sometimes in conflict with Rana. In the beginning of the series he was a pilot employed by a spatial agency. The "Sagittarius", which is the spatial ship in which the heroes travel through space, comes from that agency. In the comics, his name is Tope.

Rana (ラナ)
Voiced by: Kenichi Ogata

He resembles an anthropomorphic green frog. He is married to an obese woman. He has seven children who love him dearly. When unemployed by the Sagittarius crew, he has difficulty to find a job he likes, often forced to work in bad conditions in factories, waiting for the next travel with the Sagittarius. He is the most aggressive of the group and has a short temper. He also likes to flirt with women. He adores lasagna.

Giraffe (ジラフ, Jirafu)
Voiced by: Yoku Shioya

A giant yellow guy, he is the taller of the group. After Toppy he is the most wise member of the crew. He is a scientist and knows a lot about subjects such as chemistry and botany. He is completely in love with Professor Anne, though they are not married during the most part of the show. Rana has a tendency to irritate him. Giraffe and Toppy are really the brains of the team and as such their role in the show is crucial.

Sebeep (シビップ, Shibippu)
Voiced by: Mitsuko Horie

An anthropomorphic plant which resembles a cactus. Sebeep was found by Toppy, Rana and Giraffe on a planet in one of their adventures and he became a member of the team. Sebeep is always happy and smiling. He is the group's guitarist and singer, always seen with a guitar attached on his back. He likes to both sing and dance. The episodes in which Sebeep is the star are very emotional episodes and almost always involve singing at some point.

Professor Anne (アン教授, An-kyōju)
Voiced by: Maya Okamoto

A scientist, Professor Anne is the most regularly seen woman in the show. She has pink hair and her face resembles Toppy's a lot. She loves Giraffe, although she sometimes reacts with rudeness to him.

=== Other characters ===
Beat (ピート, Pīto)
Voiced by: Gara Takashima
Libu (リブ, Ribu)
Voiced by: Mayumi Shō, Kumiko Watanabe
Nala (ナラ, Nara)
Voiced by: Atsuko Mine
Tora (トラ)
Voiced by: Chika Sakamoto
Tara (タラ)
Voiced by: Miki Narahashi
Runa (ルナ)
Voiced by: Kumiko Watanabe
Lala (ララ, Rara)
Voiced by: Kazue Ikura
Karin (カリン)
Voiced by: Eriko Hara
Company President (社長, Shachō)
Voiced by: Yasuo Muramatsu

== Songs ==
Stardust Boys (スターダスト ボーイズ)

Opening theme sung by: Hironobu Kageyama & Koorogi '73

Dream Light Years (夢光年)

Ending theme sung by: Hironobu Kageyama & Koorogi '73

Soul Brother (ソウルブラザー)

Image Song sung by: Hironobu Kageyama & Koorogi '73

LIVING IN THE LIFE

Image Song sung by: Hironobu Kageyama & Koorogi '73
