= Beyblade (manga) =

Japanese manga series

- Cover of the fifth tankōbon volume, featuring Tyson (Takao) (center), Ray (Rei) (left), Kai (top) and Max (right)

爆転シュートベイブレード (Bakuten Shūto Beiburēdo)
- Genre: Adventure; Sports
- Manga
- Written by: Takao Aoki
- Published by: Shogakukan
- English publisher: AUS: Chuang Yi; NA: Viz Media; SG: Chuang Yi
- Magazine: CoroCoro Comic
- Original run: August 10, 1999 – June 15, 2004
- Volumes: 14
- Anime television series
- Directed by: Toshifumi Kawase
- Produced by: Masao Maruyama; Jae-Young Kim; Eun-Mi Lee
- Written by: Kazuhiko Soma; Tatsuhiko Urahata
- Music by: Yoshihisa Hirano
- Studio: Madhouse
- Licensed by: NA: Discotek Media
- Original network: TXN (TV Tokyo)
- English network: AU: Network Ten, Fox Kids; BI: Cartoon Network, Toonami, Pop; CA: YTV, Teletoon; US: Toon Disney, ABC Family
- Original run: January 8, 2001 – December 24, 2001
- Episodes: 51
Further information
Anime television series
Beyblade V-Force
Directed by	Yoshio Takeuchi
Produced by	Shin'ichi Ikeda; Susumu Matsuyama; Kanehide Sai
Written by	Yoshifumi Fukushima
Music by	Hiruyuki Hayase
Studio	Nippon Animedia
Licensed by	NA: Discotek Media
Original network	TXN (TV Tokyo)
English network	AU: Network Ten, Fox Kids; US: Jetix, Toon Disney, ABC Family
Original run	January 7, 2002 – December 30, 2002
Episodes	51
Film
Beyblade: Fierce Battle (2002)
Anime television series
Beyblade G-Revolution
Directed by	Mitsuo Hashimoto
Produced by	Shin'ichi Ikeda; Susumu Matsuyama; Mamiko Aoki; Shunju Aoki
Written by	Jiro Takayama
Music by	Yasuharu Takanashi
Studio	Nippon Animedia
Licensed by	NA: Discotek Media
Original network	TXN (TV Tokyo)
English network	AU: Network Ten; AUS: Cartoon Network; UK: Jetix; US: Toon Disney, ABC Family
Original run	January 6, 2003 – December 29, 2003
Episodes	52
Manga
Bakuten Shoot Beyblade: Rising
Written by	Takao Aoki
Published by	Shogakukan
Magazine	CoroCoro Aniki (July 15, 2016 – March 15, 2021); CoroCoro online (June 15–25, 2021)
Original run	July 15, 2016 – June 25, 2021
Volumes	4
- Related manga
- Metal Fight Beyblade; Metal Fight Beyblade Zero-G; Beyblade Burst; Beyblade X
- Related
- Beyblade: Metal Fusion; BeyWheelz; BeyWarriors: BeyRaiderz; BeyWarriors: Cyborg; Beyblade Burst; Beyblade X
- icon

Beyblade, known in Japan as Bakuten Shoot Beyblade (Japanese: 爆転シュートベイブレード, Hepburn: Bakuten Shūto Beiburēdo; lit. 'Explosive-Spin Shoot Beyblade'), is a Japanese manga series written and illustrated by Takao Aoki, created to promote Takara's Beyblade spinning tops. The series focuses on a group of kids who form teams, which battle one another using Beyblades. It was serialized in Shogakukan's children's manga magazine CoroCoro Comic from August 1999 to June 2004, with its chapters collected and published in 14 tankōbon volumes. It was licensed for English release in North America by Viz Media and in Singapore, Australia and New Zealand by Chuang Yi.

An anime adaptation by Madhouse aired in Japan on TV Tokyo from January to December 2001 and was followed by two sequel series, Beyblade V-Force and Beyblade G-Revolution, and the 2002 film Beyblade: Fierce Battle all three by Nippon Animedia, a partnership between Nippon Animation, Takara, Agatsuma and Epoch. Nelvana licensed and produced English-language adaptations of the anime series and the film.

== Plot ==
=== Beyblade ===
Tyson Granger is a passionate boy who begins his Beyblade journey after defeating Carlos, a local gang leader, and attracting the rivalrous attention of the formidable Kai Hiwatari. This rivalry leads Tyson to discover his Beyblade contains a Bit-Beast named Dragoon. He enters the Japanese Regional Qualifying Tournament, where he befriends fellow bladers Ray Kon and Max Tate, both of whom also possess Bit-Beasts. After winning, they form a team with Kai called the Bladebreakers, managed by their friend Kenny.

The team travels to China, where they defeat Ray's former team, the White Tigers, and win the tournament. They proceed to America and triumph over the All Starz. Subsequently stranded in Europe, they overcome another team, the Majestics, before arriving in Russia for the world championships. There, Kai rediscovers his past with the Demolition Boys, a ruthless team led by Boris. He acquires a powerful new Beyblade, Black Dranzer, and abandons the Bladebreakers to rejoin them.

Kai later challenges his former teammates to steal their Bit-Beasts. He is ultimately defeated when Tyson wields Kai's own discarded Beyblade, Dranzer, against Black Dranzer. After being rescued from a fall through ice by his friends, Kai realizes the error of his ways and rejoins the team. Tyson then wins the final match against Tala, becoming the Beyblade World Champion.

=== Beyblade V-Force ===
A new threat emerges when Team Psykick and the Saint Shields begin attacking the former members of the Bladebreakers to steal their Bit-Beasts, forcing the team to reunite. They are joined by Hilary Tachibana, a skeptical classmate who learns to appreciate the depth of the sport. Team Psykick creates four cybernetic Bit-Beast copies and recruits bladers named Kane, Salima, Goki, and Jim, whose minds are corrupted by the artificial entities. The Bladebreakers defeat them, destroying the cyber beasts and freeing the possessed bladers.

The conflict deepens as the teams' motives are revealed. The Saint Shields aim to seal the Bit-Beasts within a sacred rock, fearing their uncontrollable power, and temporarily succeed in imprisoning Ray's Driger before being defeated. Meanwhile, Team Psykick's leader, Dr. Zagart, seeks the Bit-Beasts to empower his android son, Zeo—a replica of his deceased child—and make him human. Unaware of his own nature, Zeo befriends Tyson before learning the truth. Accepting his father's mission, he is given the powerful Bit-Beast Cerberus.

Zeo enters a world tournament, defeats Kai and Max, and steals their Bit-Beasts. In the final match, Tyson defeats Zeo, winning the tournament and causing the stolen Dranzer and Draciel to return to their original owners.

=== Beyblade G-Revolution ===
After the World Championship, Kai, Ray, and Max depart to rejoin their former teams, leaving Tyson with only Kenny and Hilary for support. Their roster is soon bolstered by the arrival of the energetic Daichi Sumeragi and Tyson's older brother, Hiro Granger, forming a new team to challenge others like the Barthez Battalion and F-Dynasty. This regrouping is swiftly followed by the return of the antagonist Boris, who establishes the Beyblade Entertainment Global Association (BEGA) under the false pretense of reform. BEGA quickly supplants the former BBA as Boris secretly plots to dominate all global Beyblade activity, enforcing a monopoly on equipment sales to suppress non-affiliated bladers.

Facing a critical parts shortage, the team's manager, Kenny, innovates by developing a new line of Hard Metal System Beyblades. Now operating as G Revolutions, the team requires one final member, which is fulfilled by Kai after his own attempt to join BEGA ends in a severe loss to the blader Brooklyn and the dissolution of his temporary team. In the ensuing five-on-five tournament against BEGA, the team suffers early losses before Kai achieves a pivotal victory over the previously undefeated Brooklyn, and Tyson defeats the powerful Garland.

The final confrontation is a tie-breaker match between Tyson and an enraged Brooklyn, who merges with his Bit-Beast, Zeus, unleashing a catastrophic power that threatens universal destruction. Tyson manages to absorb the energy of every Bit-Beast to neutralize this threat, returning Brooklyn to normal and causing the collapse of the BEGA corporation. The saga concludes with Tyson and Kai preparing for a final, personal match.

=== Beyblade Rising ===
Upon returning to Japan, Kai abandons Beyblade to manage his grandfather Voltaire's corporation, believing it is his duty. Tyson locates him and convinces him that he is sacrificing his true passion for obligation, which in turn leads Voltaire to recognize his mistake and release Kai from this responsibility. To celebrate his friend's return, Tyson challenges him to a match, which concludes with Kai utilizing his refined skills to achieve a surprising victory, delighting Tyson and signaling his official comeback to the sport.

== Media ==
=== Manga ===
Written and illustrated by Takao Aoki, Beyblade was serialized in Shogakukan's children's manga magazine CoroCoro Comic from August 10, 1999, to June 15, 2004. A gaiden, titled Shoot Gaiden Beyblade Daichi (シュート外伝 ベイブレード大地), was in parallel serialized in Bessatsu CoroCoro Comic from June 30, 2001, to December 29, 2003. Shogakukan collected both stories chapters in fourteen tankōbon volumes, released from January 20, 2000, to July 28, 2004.

The manga was licensed for English release in North America by Viz Media, with the fourteen volumes released from October 20, 2004, to December 12, 2006. Chuang Yi published the series in English, with one edition in Singapore and a separate edition in Australia and New Zealand.

A second series by Aoki, titled Beyblade Rising (爆転SHOOT ベイブレード RISING, Bakuten Shūto Beiburēdo Rising), was serialized in Shogakukan's seinen manga magazine CoroCoro Aniki from July 15, 2016, until March 15, 2021, when the magazine ceased its publication; the series continued on the CoroCoro Online website, with two chapters published on June 15 and 25, respectively. Shogakukan collected its chapters in four tankōbon volumes, released from December 12, 2017, to August 11, 2021.

=== Anime ===
The series was adapted in a television anime series produced by Madhouse, making it the studio's first use of digital ink and paint. Spanning 51 episodes, the series aired in Japan on TV Tokyo from January 8, 2001, to December 24, 2001. A sequel series produced by Nihon Animedia titled Beyblade V-Force ran for another 51 episodes from January 7, 2002, until December 30, 2002. The third series, Beyblade G-Revolution, ran for 52 episodes from January 6 to December 29, 2003.

All three seasons were licensed for English adaptation, broadcast, and release by Nelvana. The series was broadcast on the sibling cable channel YTV in Canada and ABC Family in the United States in 2002. Reruns were also seen on Toon Disney, as part of Jetix from 2004–2005, and again in 2006, as part of Jetix's "Anime Invasion Sundays" block. The series was distributed by Geneon Entertainment for its first two seasons and Funimation for the third season. The license for all three seasons were acquired by Discotek Media on November 30, 2018. They released all three on English dub-only standard definition Blu-ray; the first season on January 29, V-Force on February 26, and G-Revolution on March 26, 2019.

Several spin-off series have since been produced, including Beyblade: Metal Saga, the BeyWheelz series, Beyblade Burst, and Beyblade X.

=== Live-action film ===
A Deadline Hollywood piece in May 2015 reported that Paramount Pictures had acquired the rights to make a live action film based on Beyblade after the box office success of Hasbro's Transformers and G.I. Joe film series. The film was announced to be produced by Mary Parent through her Disruption Entertainment (later Legendary Entertainment) banner. In February 2022, it was reported that Jerry Bruckheimer would be producing the film.

== Reception ==
Common Sense Media described the series as a "formulaic toy-inspired series [that] has some good messages." Don Houston of DVD Talk wrote, "The show is just one long repetitive commercial, and not a well made commercial at that."
