= Hyakujuu Sentai Gaoranger =

Television series

- The title card for Hyakujuu Sentai Gaoranger
- Genre: Tokusatsu; Superhero fiction Fantasy fiction
- Created by: Saburo Yatsude
- Developed by: Junki Takegami
- Starring: Noboru Kaneko; Kei Horie; Takeru Shibaki; Kazuyoshi Sakai; Mio Takeuchi; Tetsuji Tamayama; Takemi; Rei Saito
- Narrated by: Hiroshi Masuoka
- Opening theme: "Gaoranger Hoero!!" by Yukio Yamagata
- Ending theme: "Healin' You" by Salia (1–44, 46–50) "Gaoranger Roar!!" by the Gaorangers & Yukio Yamagata (45) "Stairway to the Sky" by the Gaorangers (51)
- Composer: Kōtarō Nakagawa
- Country of origin: Japan
- Original language: Japanese
- No. of episodes: 51 (list of episodes)

Production
- Producers: Jun Hikasa (TV Asahi); Kenji Ōta (TV Asahi); Yuka Takahashi (Toei); Kōichi Yada (Toei Advertising)
- Production location: Tokyo, Japan (Greater Tokyo Area)
- Running time: 25 minutes
- Production companies: TV Asahi; Toei Company; Toei Advertising

Original release
- Network: ANN (TV Asahi)
- Release: February 18, 2001 – February 10, 2002

Related
- Mirai Sentai Timeranger; Ninpuu Sentai Hurricaneger

Hyakujuu Sentai Gaoranger (百獣戦隊ガオレンジャー, Hyakujū Sentai Gaorenjā; Hundred Beasts Squadron Gaoranger) (Note: Gao (ガオ) is the Japanese onomatopoeia equivalent to a roaring sound. The Gaoranger roll call uses the kanji for "fang" (牙, kiba) and "howl" (吠, hoe) which are read together as "Gao" (牙吠).) is a Japanese Tokusatsu television series and Toei's 25th production of the Super Sentai metaseries airing in 2001 and celebrated the franchise's 25th anniversary. After Toei Company filed a trademark on October 25, 2000, it aired from February 18, 2001, to February 10, 2002, replacing Mirai Sentai Timeranger, and was replaced by Ninpuu Sentai Hurricaneger. Footage from this show was used in the 2002 American series Power Rangers Wild Force and was later dubbed in 2010 as the retitled Power Rangers: Jungle Force for South Korean television in place of Samurai Sentai Shinkenger. Gaoranger aired alongside Kamen Rider Agito.

On May 14, 2018, it was announced that Shout! Factory had licensed Gaoranger for release in North America and it was released on December 18, 2018. This is the 11th Super Sentai to be released in North America on DVD in Region 1 format as Jetman was released before Gaoranger.

== Plot ==
A millennium ago, humans fought a war against demon ogres known as the Orgs. With the help of the Power Animals, the ancient Gao Warriors were able to defeat the Orgs' leader Hyakkimaru, sealing the Orgs away along with one of their own. When the seal wanes, the Power Animals select a new generation of Gao Warriors to fight the freed Orgs and protect all life on Earth. The current Gao Warriors, the Gaorangers, are recruited to abandon their civilian lives and names while traveling to find the other Power Animals that were in hiding.

== Characters ==
=== Gaorangers ===
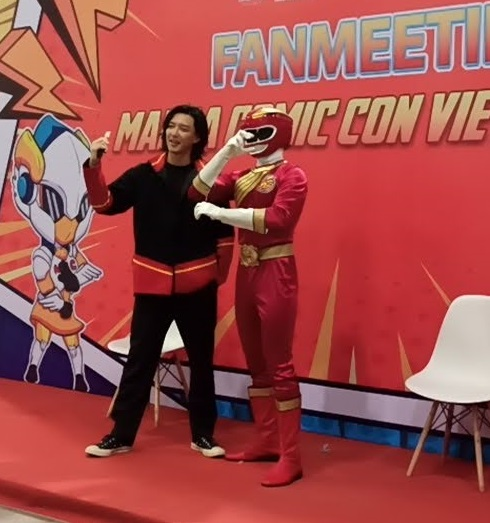
Kakeru Shishi's actor, Noboru Kaneko, posing with a Gao Red cosplayer at a comic con in Vietnam.

The primary members of the eponymous Gaorangers each carry a G-Phone (Gフォン, Jī Fon) as their transformation device along with a Beast King Sword (獣皇剣, Jūōken) as their sidearm. By combining their personal weapons, they form the Evil-Crushing Hyakuju Sword (破邪百獣剣, Haja Hyakujū Ken) to destroy human-sized Orgs.

Kakeru Shishi (獅子 走, Shishi Kakeru)
Kakeru was a veterinarian before he was chosen by Gao Lion to become Gao Red (ガオレッド, Gao Reddo). He was the last chosen of the Gaorangers, but is made their leader due to his affinity for animals.

As the "Blazing Lion" (灼熱の獅子, Shakunetsu no Shishi), Gao Red, Kakeru wields the Lion Fang (ライオンファング, Raion Fangu) cestus, which can either separate into a pair of claws that allow him to perform the Blazing Fire (ブレイジングファイヤー, Bureijingu Faiyā) attack or transform into the Gao Mane Buster (ガオメインバスター, Gao Mein Basutā) Gatling gun. Later in the series, he acquires the Falcon Summoner (ファルコンサモナー, Farukon Samonā) bow, which can switch between Gun Mode (ガンモード, Gan Mōdo) and Arrow Mode (アローモード, Arō Mōdo). He can also combine the Falcon Summoner and a Beast King Sword to access the former's Summoner Mode (サモナーモード, Samonā Mōdo), which allows him to summon Gao Falcon.

Gaku Washio (鷲尾 岳, Washio Gaku)
Gaku was an airforce pilot before he was chosen by Gao Eagle to become Gao Yellow (ガオイエロー, Gao Ierō). He is serious and regimental, deciding that the Gaorangers should refer to each other by color instead of name.

As the "Noble Eagle" (孤高の荒鷲, Kokō no Arawashi), Gao Yellow, Gaku wields the Eagle Sword (イーグルソード, Īguru Sōdo), which allows him to perform the Noble Slash (ノーブルスラッシュ, Nōburu Surasshu) attack.

Kai Samezu (鮫津 海, Samezu Kai)
Kai was a freeter before he was chosen by Gao Shark to become Gao Blue (ガオブルー, Gao Burū). He is the most immature of the team.

As the "Surging Shark" (怒涛の鮫, Dotō no Same), Gao Blue, Kai dual wields the twin bladed Shark Cutter (シャークカッター, Shāku Kattā) tonfa, which allow him to perform the Surging Chopper (サージングチョッパー, Sājingu Choppā) attack.

Soutarou Ushigome (牛込 草太郎, Ushigome Sōtarō)
Soutarou was a sumo wrestler who was forced to quit due to an injury and was working as a florist before he was chosen by Gao Bison to become Gao Black (ガオブラック, Gao Burakku), utilizing his sumo wrestling skills and style to fight. He is physically the strongest yet shyest of the team.

As the "Iron Bison" (鋼の猛牛, Hagane no Mōgyū), Gao Black, Soutarou wields the Bison Axe (バイソンアックス, Baison Akkusu), which allows him to perform the Iron Broken (アイアンブロークン, Aian Burōkun) attack.

Sae Taiga (大河 冴, Taiga Sae)
Sae was a martial arts student under her father before she was chosen by Gao Tiger to be Gao White (ガオホワイト, Gao Howaito). She is the youngest member of the team with a deep admiration for Kakeru.

As the "Belle Tiger" (麗しの白虎, Uruwashi no Byakko), Gao White, Sae wields the Tiger Baton (タイガーバトン, Taigā Baton), which allows her to perform the Belle Crisis (ベルクライシス, Beru Kuraishisu) attack.

Tsukumaro "Shirogane" Oogami (大神 "シロガネ" 月麿, Ōgami "Shirogane" Tsukumaro)
Tsukumaro was a Gao Warrior from the Heian period over 1,000 years ago. He used the power of the Dark Wolf Mask to defeat the evil Hyakkimaru (百鬼丸). However, he was turned into Duke Org Rouki (デュークオルグ狼鬼, Dyūku Orugu Rōki) and got the other Gao Warriors to entomb him so he could not do any more harm. He was later awakened as Rouki in the present age, but is freed of his curse by the Gaorangers before he is chosen by Gao Wolf to become Gao Silver (ガオシルバー, Gao Shirubā).

As the "Sparkling Wolf" (閃烈の銀狼, Senretsu no Ginrō), Gao Silver, Tsukumaro utilizes the G-Brace Phone (Ｇブレスフォン, Jī-Buresu Fon) to transform. He also wields the Gao Hustler Rod (ガオハスラーロッド, Gao Hasurā Roddo) sidearm, which can switch between its rapier-like Saber Mode (サーベルモード, Sāberu Mōdo), its rifle-like Sniper Mode (スナイパーモード, Sunaipā Mōdo), and its cue stick-like Break Mode (ブレイクモード, Bureiku Mōdo).

=== Power Animals ===
The Power Animals (パワーアニマル, Pawā Animaru) are the Gaorangers' sentient mecha that can be summoned from the Animarium by utilizing their corresponding Gao Jewel (ガオの宝珠, Gao no Hōju) orbs in conjunction with a Beast King Sword and/or the Gao Hustler Rod.

- Gao Lion (ガオライオン, Gao Raion): Gao Red's personal Power Animal who forms the torso of Gao King (ガオキング, Gao Kingu). When enlarged, it can form the lower body of Gao Kentaurus (ガオケンタウロス, Gao Kentaurosu).
- Gao Eagle (ガオイーグル, Gao Īguru): Gao Yellow's personal Power Animal who forms the head of Gao King and the waist of Gao Muscle (ガオマッスル, Gao Massuru) and Gao Knight (ガオナイト, Gao Naito).
- Gao Shark (ガオシャーク, Gao Shāku): Gao Blue's personal Power Animal who forms the right arm of Gao King, Gao Kentaurus, and Gao Knight.
- Gao Bison (ガオバイソン, Gao Baison): Gao Black's personal Power Animal who forms the hips and legs of Gao King, Gao Muscle, and Gao Knight.
- Gao Tiger (ガオタイガー, Gao Taigā): Gao White's personal Power Animal who forms the left arm of Gao King, Gao Kentarus, and Gao Knight.
- Gao Wolf (ガオウルフ, Gao Urufu): Gao Silver's personal Power Animal who forms the left arm of Gao Hunter (ガオハンター, Gao Hantā). It can also transform into the Wolf Roader (ウルフローダー, Urufu Rōdā) motorcycle for Tsukumaro to ride into battle.
- Gao Elephant (ガオエレファント, Gao Erefanto): Gao White's turquoise-colored secondary Power Animal who separates into a sword and shield to be wielded by Gao King, Gao Kentaurus, and Gao Knight.
- Gao Giraffe (ガオジュラフ, Gao Jurafu): Gao Blue's orange-colored secondary Power Animal who forms the right arm of Gao Icarus (ガオイカロス, Gao Ikarosu).
- Gao Bear (ガオベアー, Gao Beā): Gao Yellow's black-colored pyrokinetic secondary Power Animal who forms the left arm of Gao Muscle.
- Gao Polar (ガオポーラー, Gao Pōrā): Gao Yellow's white-colored cryokinetic secondary Power Animal who forms the right arm of Gao Muscle.
- Gao Gorilla (ガオゴリラ, Gao Gorira): Gao Red's green-colored secondary Power Animal who forms the head and torso of Gao Muscle.
- Gao Hammerhead (ガオハンマーヘッド, Gao Hanmāheddo): Gao Silver's purple-colored secondary Power Animal who forms the right arm of Gao Hunter. It is a redesigned version of Gao Shark.
- Gao Ligator (ガオリゲーター, Gao Rigātā): Gao Silver's dark green-colored secondary Power Animal who forms the head, torso, and legs of Gao Hunter.
- Gao Rhinos (ガオライノス, Gao Rainosu): Gao Black's deep sky blue-colored secondary Power Animal who forms the hips and legs of Gao Icarus.
- Gao Madillo (ガオマジロ, Gao Majiro): Gao Black's lavender-colored secondary Power Animal who attaches to the right foot of Gao Icarus.
- Gao Deers (ガオディアス, Gao Diasu): Gao White's lime green-colored secondary Power Animal who forms the left arm of Gao Icarus.
- Gao Falcon (ガオファルコン, Gao Farukon): Gao Red's scarlet-colored secondary Power Animal who forms the head, torso, and wings of Gao Icarus and Gao Kentaurus. Unlike the other Power Animals, it is summoned from a volcano via the Falcon Summoner.

==== God Power Animals ====
The God Power Animals (ゴッドパワーアニマル, Goddo Pawā Animaru) are the five individual components of Gao God (ガオゴッド, Gao Goddo), a recolored and redesigned version of Gao King who can assume the form of a boy named Futaro (風太郎, Fūtarō).

- Gao Leon (ガオレオン, Gao Reon): A gunmetal-colored God Power Animal who forms the torso of Gao God. It is a recolored version of Gao Lion.
- Gao Condor (ガオコンドル, Gao Kondoru): A blue-colored God Power Animal who forms the head of Gao God. It is a recolored and redesigned version of Gao Eagle.
- Gao Sawshark (ガオソーシャーク, Gao Sōshāku): A maroon-colored God Power Animal who forms the right arm of Gao God. It is a recolored and redesigned version of Gao Shark.
- Gao Buffalo (ガオバッファロー, Gao Baffarō): A brown-colored God Power Animal who forms the hips and legs of Gao God. It is a recolored and redesigned version of Gao Bison.
- Gao Jaguar (ガオジャガー, Gao Jagā): A yellow-colored God Power Animal who forms the left arm of Gao God. It is a recolored version of Gao Tiger.

==== Other Power Animals ====
- Gao Kong (ガオコング, Gao Kongu): A red-colored version of Gao Gorilla who forms the head and torso of Gao Knight. This Power Animal appears exclusively in the film Hyakujuu Sentai Gaoranger the Movie: The Fire Mountain Roars.
- Gao Panda (ガオパンダ): A recolored version of Gao Bear and/or Gao Polar who can perform the Bamboo Hurricane (バンブーハリケーン, Banbū Harikēn) attack. This Power Animal appears exclusively in the drama CD Hyakujuu Sentai Gaoranger Gao Access CD: Gao Panda Appears!!.

The remaining Power Animals were mapped out by Toei with some of them having their toys slowly realized as their way to celebrate the 25th anniversary of Hyakuju Sentai Gaoranger and to celebrate the 10th anniversary of the Shokugan Modeling Project.

- Gao Peacock (ガオピーコック, Gao Pīkokku): A blue/yellow-colored Power Animal who forms the torso of Gao Guardian (ガオガーディアン, Gao Gādian). Its sphere makes a cameo in the final episode.
- Gao Wallaby (ガオワラビー, Gao Warabī): A navy blue-colored Power Animal who forms the legs of Gao Guardian.
  - Ko Wallaby (子ワラビー, Ko Warabī): Gao Wallaby's joey who rides in its pouch and forms the head of Gao Guardian.
- Gao Toppy (ガオトッピー, Gao Toppī): A yellow-colored Power Animal who forms the right arm of Gao Guardian.
- Gao Turtle (ガオタートル, Gao Tātoru): A lime green-colored Power Animal who forms the left arm of Gao Guardian.
- Gao Cobra (ガオコブラ, Gao Kobura): A purple-colored Power Animal who rides around in a golden pot-like vessel.
- Gao Crow (ガオクローン, Gao Kurōn)
- Gao Stingray (ガオスティングレイ, Gao Sutinguri): Its sphere makes a cameo in the final episode.
- Gao Horse (ガオホース, Gao Hōsu): Its sphere makes a cameo in the final episode.
- Gao Camel (ガオキャメル, Gao Kyameru)
- Gao Mouse (ガオマウス, Gao Mausu): Its sphere makes a cameo in the final episode.
- Gao Tortoise (ガオトータス, Gao Tōtasu)
- Gao Manta (ガオマンタ, Gao Manta): A Power Animal who forms the torso and legs of Gao Triple (ガオトリプル, Gao Toripuru).
  - Mini Manta (ミニマンタ, Mini Manta): Gao Manta's miniature companion who forms the chest plate of Gao Triple.
- Gao Boar (ガオボアー, Gao Boā): A Power Animal who pulls a cart with two cannons on it. Gao Boar forms the left arm of Gao Triple while the cart forms its head, back, and cannons.
- Gao Bat (ガオバット, Gao Batto): A Power Animal with two versions of itself. The good version forms the right arm and wings of Gao Triple while the evil version forms the head and chest armor of Gao Devil (ガオデビル, Gao Debiru).
- Gao Mammoth (ガオマンモス, Gao Manmosu): A Power Animal who drags around a platform and can assume a centaur-like form.
- Gao Hawk (ガオホーク, Gao Hōku)
- Gao Vulture (ガオヴァルチャー, Gao Varuchā)
- Gao Owl (ガオオウル, Gao Ōru)
- Gao Swallow (ガオスワロー, Gao Suwarō): A Power Animal who forms the head, torso, and arms of Gao Mercury (ガオマーキュリー, Gao Mākyurī).
- Gao Mole (ガオモール, Gao Mōru): A Power Animal who forms the right leg of Gao Mercury.
- Gao Penguin (ガオペンギン, Gao Pengin): A Power Animal who forms the left leg of Gao Mercury.
- Gao Swan (ガオスワン, Gao Suwan)
- Gao Koala (ガオコアラ, Gao Koara)
- Gao Fox (ガオフォックス, Gao Fokkusu)
- Gao Hedgehog (ガオヘッジホッグ, Gao Hejjihoggu)
- Gao Mingo (ガオミンゴ, Gao Mingo)
- Gao Cougar (ガオクーガー, Gao Kūgā)
- Gao Wombat (ガオウォンバット, Gao Wonbatto)
- Gao Glider (ガオグライダー, Gao Guraidā)
- Gao Kangaroo (ガオカンガルー, Gao Kangarū)
- Gao Fangolin (ガオファンゴリオン, Gao Fangorion)
- Gao Sloth (ガオスロウス, Gao Surousu)
- Gao Rabbit (ガオラビット, Gao Rabitto)
- Gao Utan (ガオウータン, Gao Ūtan)
- Gao Prairie (ガオプレーリー, Gao Purērī)
- Gao Ape (ガオエイプ, Gao Eipu): A Power Animal of indeterminate species. A limited edition mail-order toy version of this Power Animal was released where it was depicted as a gray-colored version of Gao Kong.
- Gao Howl (ガオハウル, Gao Hauru)
- Gao Crescent (ガオクレッセント, Gao Kuressento)
- Gao Toad (ガオトード, Gao Tōdo)
- Gao Kark (ガオカーク, Gao Kāku)
- Gao Beaver (ガオビーバー, Gao Bībā)
- Gao Hamster (ガオハムスター, Gao Hamusutā)
- Gao Lynx (ガオリンクス, Gao Rinkusu)
- Gao Whale (ガオホエール, Gao Hoēru)
- Gao Dolphin (ガオドルフィン, Gao Dorufin)
- Gao Grampus (ガオグランパス, Gao Guranpasu)
- Gao Pelican (ガオペリカン, Gao Perikan)
- Gao Lesser (ガオレッサー, Gao Ressā)
- Gao Raccoon (ガオラクーン, Gao Rakūn)
- Gao Mink (ガオミンク, Gao Minku)
- Gao Skunk (ガオスカンク, Gao Sukanku)
- Gao Mongoose (ガオマングース, Gao Mangūsu)
- Gao Panther (ガオパンサー, Gao Pansā)
- Gao Cheetah (ガオチーター, Gao Chītā)
- Gao Dugong (ガオジュゴン, Gao Jugon)
- Gao Goat (ガオゴート, Gao Gōto)
- Gao Sheep (ガオシープ, Gao Shīpu)
- Gao Seal (ガオシール, Gao Shīru)
- Gao Donkey (ガオドンキ, Gao Donki)
- Gao Hound (ガオハウンド, Gao Haundo)
- Gao Potamus (ガオポタマス, Gao Potamasu)
- Gao Rednose (ガオレッドノーズ, Gao Reddonōzu)
- Gao Dile (ガオダイル, Gao Dairu): A Power Animal who forms the torso, legs, and shoulder cannons of Gao Devil.
- Gao Jaws (ガオジョーズ, Gao Jōzu): A Power Animal who forms the left arm of Gao Devil. It is a redesigned version of Gao Shark.
- Gao Lizard (ガオリザード, Gao Rizādo)
- Gao Chameleon (ガオカメレオン, Gao Kamereon)
- Gao Coyote (ガオコヨーテ, Gao Koyōte)
- Gao Zebra (ガオゼブラ, Gao Zebura)
- Gao Gaur (ガオガウル, Gao Gauru)
- Gao Eel (ガオイール, Gao Īru)
- Gao Serpent (ガオサーペント, Gao Sāpento)
- Gao Jackal (ガオジャッカル, Gao Jakkaru)
- Gao Ryx (ガオリックス, Gao Rikkusu)
- Gao Carp (ガオカープ, Gao Kāpu)
- Gao Salamander (ガオサラマンダー, Gao Saramandā)
- Gao Snake (ガオスネーク, Gao Sunēku)

=== Ogre Tribe Org ===
The Ogre Tribe Org (鬼族オルグ, Onizoku Orugu) is a race of Oni born from the sadness and madness of humans. They operate in a cavern known as the Matrix.

Ultimate Org Hyakkimaru (究極オルグ百鬼丸, Kyūkyoku Orugu Hyakkimaru)
Ultimate Org Hyakkimaru is seen in flashbacks and was the Org that was responsible for destroying Gao God one thousand years earlier before he himself was killed by Gao Hunter, which was powered by Rouki's evil energy. As by its name, Hyakkimaru was created by many Highness Duke Orgs joining into a single form. His shadowy silhouette resembles Rakushaasa.

Ultimate Org Senki (究極オルグセンキ, Kyūkyoku Orugu Senki)
The source of the Orgs' power after the Org Master was sealed. Senki was created when the Org Heart merges the remnants of the three Highness Dukes, fulfilling the prophecy of the "Last Org Advent". Stronger than Hyakkimaru was, Senki overpowers the Gaorangers, destroying all the Power Animals and bringing the Animarium down. He then attacked the city, but the Power Animals are all revived and countless others arrive to help. All the Power Animals are able to destroy Senki's physical body, while the Gaorangers contributed their energy to Hyakujuuken and used it to destroy Senki's heart so he could not revive himself. The Highness Dukes' combined weapon, which is also Senki's default weapon, is the All-Carnage Ogre Blade (修羅百鬼剣, Shura Hyakkiken). This weapon is the Highness Dukes' own version of the Gaoranger's Hyakujuuken, which is a combination of Shuten's axe, Ura's fan, and Rasetsu's fork and knife.

Orgets (オルゲット, Orugetto)
The minions of the Ogre Tribe Org created from a pink liquid. Considered the lowest class of Orgs because of their small, undeveloped horns. Armed with clubs that also function as flamethrowers. A different class of red-skinned colored Orgets were responsible for Muraki losing her voice, because she saved Tsukumaro from their attack thousands of years ago. They were all destroyed when the 100 Power Animals gathered to battle Senki.

==== Highness Duke Orgs ====
The Highness Duke Orgs (ハイネスデュークオルグ, Hainesu Dyūku Orugu) are the rulers of the Ogre Tribe Org.

Highness Duke Org Shuten (ハイネスデュークオルグ シュテン, Hainesu Dūku Orugu Shuten)
The first of the Highness Dukes to be awakened, this cyclops-like (he had one main eye) multi-eyed Org wants to take over the world. Short-tempered, he wields the Highness Axe (ハイネスアックス, Hainesu Akkusu) and can stretch his arms. He once attempted to obtain Gao Elephant's Gao Jewel while it was dormant, but is forced to leave both it and the scroll behind when the orb left painful scars on his palms. He attempts to have the Dukes find ideal Orgs with his detached eye, only to anger the Org Master with his repeated failure. Seeking to redeem himself, Shuten attempts to destroy the Gaorangers by blocking the Gao Soul, knocking them around in human form while the Dukes take their Gao Jewels. But at the last second, Pyochan restores the Gao Souls, with Gao Red defeating Shuten with Gao Mane Buster. Refusing to accept defeat, Shuten takes TsueTsue's staff to perform the Highness Duke secret technique to enlarge at full power. But Shuten was not much for the Soul Bird-powered Gao Muscle and Gao King. Though he survives the Super Animal Heart, Shuten is killed by the newly awakened Highness Duke Org Ura, who drains and absorbs all his power. Shuten is later resurrected, fighting Gao Red and Gao Yellow in a vain attempt to protect the red idol on the mountain that powers the barrier protecting the Matrix. Though he was killed, TsueTsue uses the Org Heart to fuse him with the others to create Senki.
Highness Duke Org Ura (ハイネスデュークオルグ ウラ, Hainesu Dūku Orugu Ura)
The second Highness Duke to be awakened, in response to Shuten's failure, he was effeminate with a nose-like face and ear-like projections on his back. Obsessed with collecting beautiful items, he is the one who awakens Rouki. He uses a magic mirror to see things at a distance and carries a fan as his weapon. Through Rouki, Ura gains the four Power Animal orbs that Rouki had stolen and uses them to create Chimera Org. However, the Org is beaten by the newly transformed Gao Silver, who also kills Ura. But Ura's crown survived and, after TsueTsue used it to briefly become Onihime, Ura regenerates himself from it. From there, Ura cultivates the displaced Thousand-Year Evil, making it stronger with each host he creates for it. Soon enough, Ura captures Gao Silver to have him reabsorb the evil power. However, after Gao Silver rejects it, Ura is able to absorb it to evolve into a more powerful form called Ultimate Form Ura (ウラ究極体, Ura Kyūkyokutai) which was his actual plan from the beginning. With his new power, Ura kills the Gaorangers with only Kakeru and Tsukumaro the sole survivors of the first attack. The two Gaorangers try to fight Ura on their own until the others provide Gao Red with the Falcon Summoner and Gao Falcon as Gao God revives them to aid in forming Gao Icarus, engaging in a dogfight before purging his body of the Thousand-Year Evil with Icarus Dynamite. Restored to normal, Ura is wounded by Gao Silver who destroys his crown so Ura would be killed for good by the Gaorangers' Hyakuujuuken. Ura was later resurrected, fighting Gao Silver and Gao White in a vain attempt to protect the green idol in the forest that powers the barrier protecting the Matrix. Though he was killed, TsueTsue uses the Org Heart to fuse him with the others to create Senki.
Highness Duke Org Rasetsu (ハイネスデュークオルグ ラセツ, Hainesu Dūku Orugu Rasetsu)
The final Highness Duke to be awakened, a hermaphrodite with a mass of mouths with both male and female voices who referred himself as the "Prince of Despair". He is ravenous with an appetite for anything within reach, using a knife and fork as his weapons. He treats the Duke Orgs like dirt, painfully transferring their powers to certain Orgs. His very plan from the beginning was severing the ties between the Gaorangers and the Power Animals, using Kurushimemas Org to obtain Kakeru's G-Phone to implant a bug-extension of him into it to pinpoint Gao's Rock. But he had an alternate motive in getting Tetomu, whose cooking he obsessed for. He almost got Tetomu as his chef, sacrificing TsueTsue in the process while removing the Gaorangers from the picture, if the Power Animals hadn't drove him away. Refusing to accept defeat, Rasetsu decides to complete his plan on Christmas, with his bug destroying the G-Phones prior to the fight while he smashes the G-Brace Phone. Rasetsu then ingests his creation to assume giant size to destroy Gao's Rock. But before Rasetsu can eat the gang, the Power Animals arrive, with Gao Deers restoring the Gaorangers' transformation devices. Gao Muscle and Gao Hunter managed to wound the Highness Duke Org enough for Gao Kentarus to land the deathblow. Rasetsu is later resurrected as the leader of the other Highness Duke Orgs, fighting Gao Black and Gao Blue in a vain attempt to protect the blue idol within the lake that powers the barrier protecting the Matrix. Though he was killed, TsueTsue uses the Org Heart to fuse him with the others to create Senki.

==== Duke Orgs ====
The Duke Orgs (デュークオルグ, Dyūku Orugu) oversee the Baron Org attacks.

Duke Org Yabaiba (デュークオルグ ヤバイバ, Dyūku Orugu Yabaiba)
A crazed pierrot-like master of knives who claimed himself to Gao Yellow's greatest rival. He commonly blurts out "That's yabai-bad" (これはヤバイバ, Kore wa yabai-ba!) whenever things got wrong for him and the other Orgs. While affected by residual energy from the Thousand-Year Evil, Yabaiba became Armored Yabaiba (装甲ヤバイバ, Sōkō Yabaiba), which lasted until Ura was killed for good. While attempting to impress Rasetsu, Yabaiba enlisted the aid of his brother Juggling Org, forming Team Circus to kill the Gaorangers. When his brother was overwhelmed by Gao King, Yabaiba eats the Org Seeds to grow large and fight alongside Juggling Org, until he died while the seeds' effect wore off and restored Yabaiba to normal size. Though he failed to impress Rasetsu, Yabaiba earned TsueTsue's respect and fell in love with TsueTsue over the course of the series, devastated by her death. After Yabaiba managed to conceal the Matrix's whereabouts with massive landscaping, he receives a message from beyond the grave, provided the means to revive TsueTsue: Using a fishing rod and her horn energized with the power that killed her. Using Steam Engine Org as a sacrificial lamb, Yabaiba succeeds in reeling TsueTsue out of hell, only to find the Highnesses were revived as a result. Though he began to question the intention of their masters', he followed TsueTsue out of love. After surviving the cave-in of their base, Yabaiba followed TsueTsue as they teamed up with the Jakanja in Hurricaneger vs. Gaoranger. He was finally killed by the two teams' Victory Gadget/Hyakujuuken combo along with TsueTsue.
Duke Org TsueTsue (デュークオルグ ツエツエ, Dyūku Orugu Tsuetsue)
An arrogant Org priestess whose magic is as great as her devotion to the Highnesses. She developed an instant hatred of Gao White for calling her "Grandma". TsueTsue is in charge of reviving and enlarging the minor Orgs by using special soybeans called Org Seeds (オルグシード, Orugu Shīdo) fired from her staff and chanting "Org Seeds, please allow the fallen to regain their enormous wicked power! Ogres Come in! Blessings go out!" (オルグシードよ、消えゆかんとする邪悪に再び巨大なる力を！鬼は内！福は外！, Orugu Shīdo yo, kiyukan to suru jaaku ni futatabi kyodai naru chikara o! Oni wa uchi! Fuku wa soto!). When Ura was seemingly dead, she temporarily used his crown to become the Highness Duchess Org Onihime (ハイネスデュークオルグ オニヒメ, Hainesu Dūku Orugu Onihime). While affected by residual energy from the Thousand-Year Evil, TsueTsue became Armored TsueTsue (装甲ツエツエ, Sōkō Tsuetsue). Her obsession for praise from the Highness Dukes led to her being tricked by Dorodoro into cutting off her horn in order to capture Tetomu without being affected by the sacred spring, even saying that it would grow back. Though she was near-death, TsueTsue couldn't see that she was only a pawn as she then was used by Rasetsu as a shield from the Hyakujuuken. But she was soon revived when Yabaiba energized TsueTsue's severed horn with the Hyakujuuken's power, and used it as a fishing lure to bring her back from hell. As she was reeled out of hell, she carried the three Highness Dukes with her, rewarded her loyalty with the title of Org Shaman TsueTsue (オルグの巫女 ツエツエ, Orugu no Miko Tsuetsue; 47-51) and a new staff. Afterwards, she was even more insane and driven even more for one purpose, serving the Highness Dukes to the point of creating the Org Heart that fused the Highness Dukes into Senki. After surviving the cave-in of their base, TsueTsue teamed up with the Jakenja in Hurricaneger vs. Gaoranger to get her revenge on the Gaorangers. Though she was killed by the two teams' Victory Gadget/Hyakujuuken combo, TsueTsue was resurrected a second time in GoGo Sentai Boukenger vs. Super Sentai by a combination of a Gōdom Engine and Chronos' magic (strangely, though she was destroyed on the battlefield, Chronos revived her in the Matrix) and assisted Chronos, Gajah, and Meemy, only to be used in the end as an ingredient to create a new Precious, the Staff of the Three Philosophers (３賢者の杖, Sankenja no Tsue), that powered Chronos up. After Chronos was destroyed by Burning Legend DaiVoyager, so too was the staff, and TsueTsue along with it.
Duke Org Rouki (デュークオルグ 狼鬼, Dūku Orugu Rōki)
An werewolf-like Org born from the mass of evil energy contained inside the Dark Mask, the Thousand-Year Evil (千年邪鬼, Sennen Jaki), called himself the most powerful warrior of the Orgs. Rouki wields the Crescent Moon Blade (三日月剣, Mikazukiken) which can perform the Crescent Wave (クレセントウェーブ, Kuresento Wēbu) and Moonlight Sonic (ムーンライトソニック, Mūnraito Sonikku) attacks, and like TsueTsue, he has his own Wolf Seeds (ウルフシード, Urufu Shīdo) that can enlarge Orgs by the command "Wolf Seeds, allow the fallen to regain their enormous wicked power!". Long ago, Tsukumaro used the mask to evoke his three Power Animals' combination at the cost of becoming Rouki himself. Vainly attempting to control himself, Tsukumaro had his allies seal him away into a stone coffin. But once released by Ura, Rouki is bent on exacting his 1,000 year grudge on the Gaorangers with no memory of his human life. In the process, while taking the Gao Jewels of Gao Elephant, Gao Giraffe, Gao Bear, and Gao Polar, Rouki begins to recover his memory as Tsukumaro. When the time of the full moon came, when his power is at its zenith, Ura implants a special grasshopper to modify Rouki's memory and willingly give the Gao Jewels to the Highness Duke. By then, the Gaorangers learned the truth and Tsukumaro was finally freed from the evil energy when the Gaorangers used Gao King Striker to force Gao Hunter apart and break the curse. However, Rouki was then released from his imprisonment and he attempted to kill Silver for using him and his power. Rouki was eventually defeated when Gao Silver joined forces with the other Gaorangers and Rouki was finally killed by Gao Hunter with the Dark Wolf Mask destroyed. But the Thousand-Year Evil Rouki was made of escaped and scattered, with Ura cultivating it in various Orgs. Each time an Org is killed, the evil energy become even stronger. When Gao Deers sealed the energy, Ura had the Dukes capture Tsukumaro, who forced him to reabsorb the stronger evil energy, and become Rouki again but he was able to reject the power, unaware that it was all part of Ura's plan. But thanks to Gao Icarus, the Thousand-Year Evil was finally destroyed for good.
Duke Org Kyurara & Propela (デュークオルグ キュララ＆プロプラ, Dūku Orugu Kyurara to Puropura)
A tank-based Org and a helicopter-based Org respectively, both are Rasetsu's two personal Duke Orgs. On Rasetsu's order, Kyurara and Propla start systematically destroying Tokyo to soothe their master's ravenous urges to "eat human dreams". The Gaorangers managed to pinpoint their next attack to be at Shinweiya. Though defeated, Rasetsu transfers some of TsueTsue and Yabaiba's energy into the Duke Orgs to boost his power, turning them into berserkers. Gao Red managed to destroy Propela with the Falcon Summoner, and then he and the other Gaorangers managed to destroy Kyurara with Hyakujuuken. But, Kyurara and Propela were quickly revived and overpowered Gao King and Gao Hunter, though they were both destroyed by Gao Icarus. Kyurara is voiced by Yutaka Asukai while Propla is voiced by Hideo Ishikawa.
Duke Org DoroDoro (デュークオルグ ドロドロ, Dūku Orugu Dorodoro)
A ninja Duke Org who appeared seemingly out of nowhere to aid Rasets, bent on achieving his master's goal no matter the cost. A master of Org Ninpo, he created illusions of Shrine Bell Org, Tire Org, Clock Org, Magic Flute Org, and Animal-Tamer Org to distract the Gaorangers while he had TsueTsue capture Tetomu for him. Later, DoroDoro then uses his Shadow Clone Ninpo to create the Kage Rangers (影レンジャー, Kagerenjā), shadow-clones of the Gaorangers, whom they could not destroy without killing themselves in the process. But it was by dumb luck while following Rasets' order to punish Yabaiba that his Ninpo backfired on him, creating "Kage DoroDoro" that the Rangers destroyed with the Falcon Summoner, the Kage Rangers died along with him. Yabaiba made one final attempt to please Rasets order by revive Dorodoro. On Rasets' order, DoroDoro takes the Rangers in another dimension where the spirits of dead Orgs reside. With Tetomu's help, Gao Lion evoked the formation of Gao Kentaurus who destroys DoroDoro to bring the gang back to the real world. DoroDoro is voiced by Yasunori Masutani.

===== Three Org Brothers =====
The Three Org Brothers (オルグ三兄弟, Orugu Sankyōdai; Movie) showed up on a peaceful island a year before the Gaorangers were transported there. They captured a group of natives and forced them to dig for a ruby. Their base is Demon's Castle.

Zeus Org (ゼウスオルグ, Zeusu Orugu)
The oldest brother with power over thunder (while in the actual myths, Zeus was the youngest brother). In battled, he wields a thunderbolt-shaped sword, which allows him to perform the Devil's Thunder attack. Zeus Org was the leader of the Orgs on an island in another dimension and forced the natives to mine for a special ruby that contained Gao Kong's power. Zeus was successful in slaying Kaito who was attempting to protect the Princess and then fought Gao Silver, who fended him off until the rest of the Gaorangers arrived and defeated him, causing his flaming body to fall into the ocean below. Zeus resurrected as a giant and revived his brothers just in time for the eclipse to summon Gao Kong occurred. He is destroyed by Gao Knight. Voiced by Kenta Miyake.
Poseidon Org (ポセイドンオルグ, Poseidon Orugu)
The middle brother with power over water. In battle, he wields a trident. When the Orgets kidnapped Tetomu, Poseidon wanted her as a companion and invited her to a drinking game at dinner with his brothers. Having won the contest, Tetomu was awarded half of the ruby by Poseidon. When Gao Red and Kaito attempted to rescue Tetomu, Poseidon attempted to fend them off and despite being drunk, was an effective fighter. It wasn't until Gao Yellow joined them that he was bested. He later joined his brothers in fighting the Gaorangers and the islanders and was destroyed, along with his brother Hades, by the Gaorangers before being resurrected as a giant by Zeus. He was the first to attempt to attack Gao Knight, but is destroyed by a quick stroke of its sword. Voiced by Ichiro Mizuki.
Hades Org (ハデスオルグ, Hadesu Orugu)
The youngest brother with power over wind. In battle, he wields a scythe. He is destroyed by Gao God. Voiced by Yukio Yamagata.

==== Baron Orgs ====
An Org Spirit can acquire a physical form by fusing with an inanimate object, transforming into a Baron Org (バロンオルグ, Baron Orugu) based on the object and can assume its original form for disguise. The Baron Orgs are multi-horned & desire to become Duke Orgs themselves, usually accepting the offer a Duke Org gives them in return for their own desires coming true. Whenever a Baron Org is killed, TsueTsue would point her staff at the oozy remnants, chanting as the Org Seeds shoot out of the staff and onto the puddle, recreating the Org as a giant.

Turbine Org (タービンオルグ, Tābin Orugu; 1 & Gaoranger vs. Super Sentai)
Turbine Org was capable of generating strong gusts of wind from his eyes. The first Org encountered in the series, he was pursued by the Gaoranger until he was aided by Plugma Org. Voiced by Bunkou Ogata.
Plugma Org (プラグマオルグ, Puraguma Orugu; 1, Gaoranger vs. Super Sentai)
Able to generate electric current, Plugma Org appeared to aid Turbine Org in fighting off the Gaoranger before Gao Red was found. He is the first to be killed by the Hyakujuuken. Voiced by Kaoru Saito.
Barbwire Org (ハリガネオルグ, Harigane Orugu; 2)
The result of an Org Spirit entering barbed wire, Barbwire Org terrorized people until the Dukes Orgs found him, offering him aid in his destructive urges. Voiced by Hiroshi Iida.
Camera Org (カメラオルグ, Kamera Orugu; 3)
The result of an Org Spirit entering a camera, any picture Camera Org took caused the photographed person to turn invisible and die over time, their life force sucked into his film. Voiced by Yuji Kishi.
Shrine Bell Org (ツリガネオルグ, Tsurigane Orugu; 4, 42 & 43)
The result of an Org Spirit entering a temple bell at the Laiwen Shrine, Shrine-Bell Org enjoys the sound of banging himself with his mallet and is able to trap anyone inside the large bells he creates. Voiced by Ryōichi Tanaka.
Tire Org (タイヤオルグ, Taiya Orugu; 5, Gaoranger vs. Super Sentai, 42 & 43)
An Org Spirit entering a tire, Tire Org loves traveling and can turn into a giant tire. Voiced by Bin Shimada.
Wedding Dress Org (ウェディングドレスオルグ, Wedingu Doresu Orugu; 6 & Gaoranger vs. Super Sentai)
An Org Spirit entering a wedding dress, Wedding Dress Org was stealing brides and turning them into wedding mannequins as his base with the aid of Saori Shimada in return of giving her youth. Voiced by Hisao Egawa.
Boat Org (帆船オルグ, Hansen Orugu; 7, Gaoranger vs. Super Sentai & 43)
An Org Spirit from the sea finding a sunken boat. Voiced by Hidenari Ugaki.
Signal Org (シグナルオルグ, Shigunaru Orugu; 8 & Gaoranger vs. Super Sentai)
An Org Spirit entering a signal light in Higahiku, Signal Org can use three beam attacks: Green for memory-erasing, Yellow for slow-mo, and Red for explosive attacks. Voiced by Norikazu Shimizu.
Cell Phone Org (携帯電話オルグ, Keitai Denwa Orugu; 9 & Gaoranger vs. Super Sentai)
An Org Spirit entering a cell phone, Cell Phone Org can use his Super Electro-Magnetic Wave (超電磁波, Choudenjiha) to negate even the G-Phones, which he wanted. Voiced by Kyousei Tsukui.
Bulldozer Org (ブルドーザーオルグ, Burudōzā Orugu; 10 & Gaoranger vs. Super Sentai)
An Org Spirit entering a bulldozer, Bulldozer Org possessed great physical strength and a strong liking for deforestation, wandering aimlessly through the Sacred Forest until the Dukes ran into him by accident. Voiced by Dai Matsumoto.
Samurai Doll Org (武者人形オルグ, Mushuningyō Orugu; 11)
As a result of Shuten transferring the Dukes' powers into a samurai doll, Samurai Doll Org is stronger than previous Orgs with a knowledge in the fighting arts, using his Orgken katana for his "Full Moon Cut" attack and a pistol. Voiced by Kiyoyuki Yanada.
Copy Org (コピーオルグ, Kopī Orugu; 12)
An Org Spirit entering a copy machine, Copy Org is able to assume the forms of other people with his scanner. Voiced by Yasuhiro Takato.
Freezer Org (フリーザーオルグ, Furīzā Orugu; 13)
An Org Spirit entering a freezer, Freezer Org was found by the Duke Orgs, bringing him to aid Shuten in fighting the Gaorangers with his freezing attacks. Voiced by Kazunari Tanaka.
Vacuum Cleaner Org (掃除機オルグ, Sōjiki Orugu; 15)
He was recruited by TsueTsue and Yabaiba to suck in lovely things they wanted to give to Ura. Voiced by Kōzō Shioya.
Bus Org (バスオルグ, Basu Orugu; 17)
Acquiring a tour bus as his vessel, TsueTsue and Yabaiba enlisted Bus Org to help them capture Gao Jewels by setting up news on Gao Elephant's whereabouts as bait. Voiced by Yukimasa Kishino.
Clock Org (時計オルグ, Tokei Orugu; 18, 42 & 43)
A wandering nobody who entered a longcase clock, Clock Org is able to stop/alter time around him. Voiced by Taiki Matsuno.
Glasses Org (メガネオルグ, Megane Orugu; 19)
Entering a pair of glasses, Glasses Org can possess the women's bodies. Voiced by Keiko Konno.
Bike Org (バイクオルグ, Baiku Orugu; 20)
The first Baron Org that Gao Yellow fought, the Org was originally called Scooter Org (原付きオルグ, Gentsuki Orugu), who was sealed after Gaku was unable to kill him in his first mission. A year later, Rouki found the released Org, who had evolved into a stronger version. Seeing Bike Org as a kindred spirit, Rouki recruits him to his cause. Voiced by Daisuke Sakaguchi.
Human Body Specimen Org (人体標本オルグ, Jintai Hyōhon Orugu; 21)
Though a loser Org who acquired a skeleton specimen, TsueTsue decide to use him in a scheme to win Ura's favor by setting up a haunted house to lure the Gaorangers into their trap. Voiced by Daisuke Sakaguchi.
Lawnmower Org (芝刈り機オルグ, Shibakariki Orugu; 22)
As a result of an Org Spirit entering a lawnmower, Lawnmower Org can disguise himself as a riding lawnmower and takes pride in his soccer field lawn. Voiced by Tetsuo Sakaguchi.
Chimera Org (キマイラオルグ, Kimaira Orugu; 24)
Created by Ura from a mud puppet infused with the Gao Elephant, Gao Giraffe, Gao Bear, and Gao Polar jewels he obtained. Chimera Org is made up of the traits from these four Power Animals.
Karaoke Org (カラオケオルグ, Karaoke Orugu; 25)
As a result of Onihime having an Org Spirit enter a karaoke machine, Karaoke Org can steal people's speaking abilities and replace them with cat sounds. Voiced by Hideyuki Umezu.
Blacksmith Org (カジヤオルグ, Kajiya Orugu; 35)
An Org Spirit fusing with various blacksmith materials, Blacksmith Org raided Tsubakuro City for ideal metal to create tableware for Rasetsu. Voiced by Kazuhiko Kishino.
Magic-Flute Org (魔笛オルグ, Mateki Orugu; 36, 42 & 43)
An Org Spirit entering a flute, its body is shaped like an ocarina. Voiced by Hironori Miyata.
Juggling Org (ジャグリングオルグ, Jaguringu Orugu; 37)
The younger brother of Yabaiba whose aid he enlists to gain praise from Rasetsu, forming Team Circus. Voiced by Toshiyuki Hayase.
Animal Tamer Org (猛獣使いオルグ, Mōjūtsukai Orugu; 38 & 42)
An Org with no backstory who refers to himself as a master beast tamer, recruited by the Duke Orgs at northern Kanto for his abilities, so Yabaiba can avenge his brother's death. Voiced by Naoki Imamura.
Monitor Org (モニターオルグ, Monitā Orugu; 39)
An Org Spirit fusing with a monitor and various pieces of garbage, Monitor Org was able to trap people in any monitor as part of Rasetsu's plan to make an ally out of Futaro. Voiced by Naoki Yanagi.
Tinplate Org (ブリキオルグ, Buriki Orugu; 40)
An Org Spirit entering a toy robot, Tinplate Org can shoot fire from its hands or use its toy-themed weapons.
Kurushimemas Org (クルシメマスオルグ, Kurushimemasu Orugu; 41)
The greatest actor among the Org, Rasetsu enlisted him in a plan to turn children into his favorite drink, Dream Juice. To accomplish that, Kurushimemas Org assumes the guise of Christmas Org (クリスマスオルグ, Kurisumasu Orugu), giving presents to children as a sign of good will, but actually giving them the stockings that would trap the children to begin the process. Furthermore, he tricked Kakeru into thinking the Orgs are tired of fighting. As a result, Kakeru befriends the Org by giving him his G-Phone. Once the trap is sprung, Kurushimemas Org assumes his true form and attacks the other Gaorangers until Kakeru manages to break free before using the Hyakujuuken with extreme prejudice on the Org. TsueTsue revives Kurushimemas Org, who died at the hands of Gao Icarus in spite of aiding Rasetsu in his master plan. Voiced by Keiichi Noda.
New Year's Org (正月オルグ, Shōkatsu Orugu; 46)
A strange Org that Yabaiba encounters two weeks after Rasetsu's death. Though he saw the Org too useless to help him, he decided to use the Org to protect the location of the Matrix. Killed by Gao Muscle and Gao Hunter Justice. Voiced by Naoki Tatsuta.
Steam Engine Org (蒸気機関オルグ, Jōkikikan Orugu; 47)
An Org that was created near a train station at Sakitomo and was the strongest Org, overpowering the Gaorangers as he withstood their attacks without breaking a sweat. At the last second, Yabaiba attacks Steam Engine Org and holds him for the Hyakujuuken to kill him. Getting the energy he needed, Yabaiba revives Steam Engine Org who wanted to kill him when the Power Animals arrive to fight. But like before, Steam Engine Org proves too powerful and cripples most of the Power Animals in the process. The remaining Powers Animals combine into Gao Icarus Another Foot & Arm, who succeed in killing Steam Engine Org with Icarus Breaker. Voiced by Masanobu Kariya.

===== Thousand-Year Evil Orgs =====
The Thousand-Year Evil Orgs (Sennen Jaki Orugu; 27-29) are three Baron Orgs that Ura creates using the Thousand-Year Evil of Rouki.

Vase Org (ツボオルグ, Tsubo Orugu; 27)
Created by Ura from a mud puppet infused with the Thousand-Year Evil, Vase Org could suck anything he marks with seal paper into his vase. Voiced by Yasuhiko Kawazu.
Bowling Org (ボウリングオルグ, Bōringu Orugu; 28)
Created by Ura from a mud puppet infused with the Thousand-Year Evil, Bowling Org was sent to "bowl" the city down with his Striker Ball until the Gaorangers intervene. Voiced by Kōichi Tōchika.
Tombstone Org (墓石オルグ, Hekaishi Orugu; 29 & 43)
As a result of Ura infusing the tombstone he made for the Gaorangers with the Thousand-Year Evil, Tombstone Org possessed a harden body. Voiced by Keiichi Sonobe.

===== Other Baron Orgs =====
Snowman Org (雪ダルマオルグ, Yukidaruma Orugu; EX)
Appeared on the Gao Access CD. After some help from Gao Panda, it was killed by Gao King.
Charcoal Grill Org (炭火焼オルグ, Sumibiyaki Orugu; 34)
A Org born fifty years ago, he caused great damage with his powers. However, he found no pleasure in his work until he found something worth grilling and took on human form to be a traveling chef. The Gaorangers find Charcoal-Grill Org when he was teaching two punks a lesson, for insulting his food though he evaded both them and the Dukes, who Highness Duke Org Rasetsu sent to get him for him. The Gaorangers find him, unaware that he was an Org as they enjoyed his food. By the next time they meet, Soutaro realizes the truth and attempts to help Charcoal-Grill Org with Gaku's help. But the Dukes managed to enrage Charcoal-Grill Org into terrorizing an industrial site. GaoBlack & GaoYellow attempt to snap Charcoal-Grill Org out of it, reminding him of his dream. Though he calmed down, Rasetsu kills the traitor. Tsuetsue then revives Charcoal-Grill Org, purging him of his humanity. Though seemingly killed by GaoIcarus, Charcoal-Grill Org was revealed to be alive and back to normal, cooking for Futaro. Voice & human form is portrayed by Taro Suwa.

== Episodes ==
1. The Lion Roars!! (獅子、吼える!!, Shishi, Hoeru!!)
2. The Spirit-King Rises!! (精霊王、起(た)つ!!, Seireiō, Tatsu!!)
3. The Eagle Vanishes!! (荒鷲が消える!!, Arawashi ga Kieru!!)
4. The Two Who Never Give Up!! (二人でネバギバ!!, Futari de Nebagiba!!)
5. The Mountain Moves!! (山が動く!!, Yama ga Ugoku!!)
6. Bison in Love!! (牛、焦がれる!!, Ushi, Kogareru!!)
7. The Dream Talks!! (夢が語る!!, Yume ga Kataru!!)
8. The Dog, Runs!! (犬、走る!!, Inu, Hashiru!!)
9. The Twins Smile (双子が微笑む, Futago ga Hohoemu)
10. The Moon Beckons!! (月が招く!!, Tsuki ga Maneku!!)
11. Father, Proceeds (父親、上京。, Chichioya, Jōkyō)
12. Which is the Real One!? (本物はどっち!?, Honmono wa Dotchi!?)
13. The Baby's First Cry Freezes (産声が凍る, Ubugoe ga Kōru)
14. The Soul Bird Cries (魂の鳥が叫ぶ, Tamashii no Tori ga Sakebu)
15. The Ogre, Howls!! (鬼、吼える!!, Oni, Hoeru!!)
16. The Magic Flute Roars!! (魔笛、轟く!!, Mateki, Todoroku!!)
17. The Elephant Vanishes... (象が消えて..., Zō ga Kiete...)
18. The Demon Beast, Armament!! (魔獣、武装!!, Majū, Busō!!)
19. The Bison, Retires!? (猛牛、脱退!?, Mōgyū, Dattai!?)
20. The Maiden is Captured!! (巫女囚わる!!, Miko Torawaru!!)
21. Rouki, Perplexed (狼鬼、惑う, Rōki, Madou)
22. The Giant Bison is Broken!! (巨牛、壊れる!!, Kyogyū, Kowareru!!)
23. Rouki, Dies!? (狼鬼、死す!?, Rōki, Shisu!?)
24. The Silver Wolf, Flashes!! (銀狼、閃く!!, Ginrō, Hirameku!!)
25. The Third Ogre Princess Arrives (三代目鬼姫参上, Sandaime Oni Hime Sanjō)
26. Rouki, Again (狼鬼、ふたたび, Rōki, Futatabi)
27. The Chick Pouts (雛がすねる, Hina ga Suneru)
28. Secrets, Handed Down!! (奥義、伝承!!, Ougi, Denshō!!)
29. The Deer Heals (鹿が癒す, Shika ga Iyasu)
30. The Full Moon Kills the Wolf! (満月が狼を殺す!, Mangetsu ga Ōkami o Korosu!)
31. The Hyakujuu Sentai, Defeated!! (百獣戦隊、全滅!!, Hyakujū Sentai, Zenmetsu!!)
32. Three Creatures Eat!! (三匹が喰う!!, Sanbiki ga Kuu!!)
33. A Boy Prays. (少年が祈る。, Shōnen ga Inoru.)
34. The Mighty Org Weeps!? (鉄人鬼(オルグ)、泣く!?, Tetsujin Orugu, Naku!)
35. The Juuou Swords, Plundered (獣皇剣、強奪, Jūōken, Gōdatsu)
36. The Warriors Dance (戦士踊る, Senshi Odoru)
37. Yabaiba Burns (ヤバイバ燃える, Yabaiba Moeru)
38. The Divine Spirit-King's Peak Decisive Battle (精霊王頂上決戦, Seireiō Chōjō Kessen)
39. The God Takes Away (神が連れ去る, Kami ga Tsuresaru)
40. Sky Island, Destroyed (天空島、滅ぶ, Tenkūjima, Horobu)
41. Santa Came (サンタが来た, Santa ga Kita)
42. The Org Ninja Invasion! (鬼(オルグ)忍者侵略!, Orugu Ninja Shinryaku!)
43. The Lion, Burning Hot (獅子、灼熱する, Shishi, Shakunetsu Suru)
44. Gao's Rock Falls (亀岩(ガオズロック)、落ちる, Gaozu Rokku, Ochiru)
45. Fighting Until the End (闘い終わらず, Tatakai Owarazu)
46. The New Year Attacks (正月が襲う, Shōgatsu ga Osou)
47. The Steam Engine Roars! (蒸気機関、爆走!, Jōkikikan, Bakusō)
48. Those Guys Return to Life (奴らが蘇る, Yatsura ga Yomigaeru)
49. The Matrix Closes (鬼洞窟(マトリックス)、閉じる, Matorikkusu, Tojiru)
50. The Hundred Beasts Die (百獣、死す, Hyakujū, Shisu)
51. The Hundred Beasts Roar!! (百獣、吼える!!, Hyakujū, Hoeru!!)

== Films ==
=== The Fire Mountain Roars ===
Hyakujuu Sentai Gaoranger the Movie: The Fire Mountain Roars (劇場版 百獣戦隊ガオレンジャー 火の山、吼える, Gekijōban Hyakujū Sentai Gaorenjā Hi no Yama, Hoeru) is the theatrical adaptation of Gaoranger that was a double bill with the Kamen Rider Series film Kamen Rider Agito the Movie: Project G4. The film features Gao Kong and Gao Knight. The events of the movie takes place between Quests 40 and 41.

=== Home media releases ===
- Hyakujuu Sentai Gaoranger Super Video: Showdown! Gaoranger vs. Gao Silver: Flame Piyo Is Born! (百獣戦隊ガオレンジャー スーパービデオ 対決!ガオレンジャーVSガオシルバー 炎のピヨちゃんたんじょう!, Hyakujū Sentai Gaorenjā Sūpā Bideo Taiketsu! Gaorenjā Tai Gao Shirubā Honō no Piyo-chan Tanjō!; 2001)

==== Gaoranger vs. Super Sentai ====
Hyakujuu Sentai Gaoranger vs. Super Sentai (百獣戦隊ガオレンジャーVSスーパー戦隊, Hyakujū Sentai Gaorenjā Tai Sūpā Sentai) aired in 2001. The plot revolves around the Gaorangers meeting up with previous sentai members. Each sentai teaches each one about their Super Sentai past. Past Sentai Heroes included Sokichi Banba/Big One from J.A.K.Q. Dengekitai, Yusuke Amamiya/Red Falcon from Choujyu Sentai Liveman, Miku Imamura/Mega Pink from Denji Sentai Megaranger, Gouki/Ginga Blue from Seijuu Sentai Gingaman and Daimon Tatsumi/Go Yellow from Kyuukyuu Sentai GoGoFive. All the prior Red Rangers from Himitsu Sentai Gorenger to Mirai Sentai Timeranger also make a cameo appearance at the end of the film. The events of the movie takes place between Quests 14 and 15.

==== Hurricaneger vs. Gaoranger ====
Ninpuu Sentai Hurricaneger vs. Gaoranger (忍風戦隊ハリケンジャーVSガオレンジャー, Ninpū Sentai Harikenjā Tai Gaorenjā; 2003) (Takes place between Episodes 30 and 31 of Ninpuu Sentai Hurricaneger)

==== Drama CD ====
A drama CD titled Hyakujuu Sentai Gaoranger Gao Access CD: Gao Panda Appears!! (百獣戦隊ガオレンジャー ガオアクセスCD 「ガオパンダあらわる!!」, Hyakujū Sentai Gaorenjā Gao Akusesu Shī Dī Gao Panda Arawaru!!) introduces Gao Panda.

==== Manga ====
A manga adaptation crossover with Himitsu Sentai Gorenger titled Hyakujuu Sentai Gaoranger vs. Himitsu Sentai Gorenger (百獣戦隊ガオレンジャーVS秘密戦隊ゴレンジャー, Hyakujū Sentai Gaorenjā Bāsasu Himitsu Sentai Gorenjā) was released in September 2001.

== Cast ==
- Kakeru Shishi: Noboru Kaneko (金子 昇, Kaneko Noboru)
- Gaku Washio: Kei Horie (堀江 慶, Horie Kei)
- Kai Samezu: Takeru Shibaki (柴木 丈瑠, Shibaki Takeru)
- Soutaro Ushigome: Kazuyoshi Sakai (酒井 一圭, Sakai Kazuyoshi)
- Sae Taiga: Mio Takeuchi (竹内 実生, Takeuchi Mio)
- Tsukumaro Oogami: Tetsuji Tamayama (玉山 鉄二, Tamayama Tetsuji)
- Tetomu (テトム), Murasaki (ムラサキ): Takemi (岳美)
- Futaro: Daiki Arioka (有岡 大貴, Arioka Daiki)
- TsueTsue: Rei Saito (斉藤 レイ, Saitō Rei)

=== Voice cast ===
- Gao Madillo: Chiaki Maeda (前田 千亜紀, Maeda Chiaki)
- Piyo (ピヨちゃん, Piyo-chan), Yo (ヨーちゃん, Yō-chan): Hiromi Konno (今野 宏美, Kon'no Hiromi)
- Gao God: Hiroshi Masuoka (増岡 弘, Masuoka Hiroshi)
- Yabaiba: Kōichi Sakaguchi (坂口 候一, Sakaguchi Kōichi)
- Rouki: Eiji Takemoto (竹本 英史, Takemoto Eiji)
- Highness Duke Org Shuten: Tetsu Inada (稲田 徹, Inada Tetsu)
- Highness Duke Org Ura: Tamotsu Nishiwaki (西脇 保, Nishiwaki Tamotsu)
- Highness Duke Org Rasetsu: Hiromi Nishikawa (西川 宏美, Nishikawa Hiromi; Upper mouth), Hidekatsu Shibata (柴田 秀勝, Shibata Hidekatsu; Lower mouth)
- Ultimate Org Senki: Daisuke Gōri (郷里 大輔, Gōri Daisuke)
- Narrator: Hiroshi Masuoka (増岡 弘, Masuoka Hiroshi)

== International broadcast and Home Video ==
- The series was limited to only airing in Asian regions outside of Japan, as most international regions have aired the Power Rangers adaptation, Power Rangers Wild Force instead. This is also the first Super Sentai season to be released on DVD in its home country of Japan. Originally released on Rental DVDs starting on October 12, 2001, it would also later be commercially released for sale on DVDs from December 8, 2001, to November 21, 2002, where all 12 volumes had all episodes with the first 10 volumes holding 4 episodes, and the last two volumes holding 5. It was also released on VHS from January till December 2002 with those same volumes. On September 8, 2021, to commemorate the 20th anniversary of the series' premiere, a collection set to spread through two volumes was released with the first volume having 25 episodes, and the second having 26.
  - This was the very first Super Sentai series to be released in Vietnam and was given a Vietnamese dub by Phuong Nam Film Studio, where it was released as "5 anh em siêu nhân Gaoranger" around 2003–2004. It has seen unprecedented success, paving the way for more Super Sentai seasons to be released in the country. Although the "Hyakujuu Sentai Gaoranger vs. Super Sentai" film was released as "Anh em chiến binh Gao."
  - The series was released on home video in Thailand with a Thai dub by Rose Home Entertainment (formerly Rose Video) and it was very popular with consumers. It also used to air on Channel 5 during 2003, with distribution by First Entertainment Company.
  - This was the first Super Sentai series since Ninja Sentai Kakuranger to air with both Mandarin (Taiwan dialect) and Cantonese dubs. However, this time both were shown at once and premiered within the same year in 2003.
    - In Taiwan, the series aired with a Taiwanese Mandarin dub on October 3, 2003, until September 26, 2004, with all episodes dubbed, airing on GTV.
    - In Hong Kong, the series aired with a Cantonese Chinese dub on November 9, 2003 (a month after Taiwan aired the Taiwanese Mandarin dub) on TVB Jade until October 24, 2004, with all episodes covered.
  - In Philippines, this series was aired as Power Rangers adaptation of Sentai series called Power Rangers Wild Force. It was aired on ABS-CBN in 2004 until 2005 dubbed in Tagalog. This is the reason that Power Rangers series in 2000's airs on RPN-9 until it returns on ABS-CBN. After sometime, Gaoranger was aired on ABC 5 with names changed and also dubbed in Tagalog.
  - In Malaysia, the series aired with a Malay dub produced by FKN Dubbing on TV2 around 2008 and finished around 2009. It was marketed under Leo Ranger.
  - In South Korea, the series was dubbed in Korean and aired in 2010 under Power Rangers Jungle Force. (파워레인저 정글포스) They have previously dubbed for its Power Rangers adaptation that was Wild Force in 2003, although aired under Power Force Rangers. (파워포스레인저) This series was picked up for broadcast after the Korean dub for Engine Sentai Go-Onger in 2009. The reason why they decided to go backwards and dub an earlier Sentai season was because they skipped Samurai Sentai Shinkenger due to the series having heavy use of elements involving Japanese culture. This is currently the only series to have both itself and its American adaptation dubbed for South Korea titled as separate shows.
  - In North America, including the United States and Canada, the series would receive a DVD release by Shout! Factory on January 30, 2018, in the original Japanese audio with English subtitles. It is the eleventh Super Sentai series to be officially released in the region.

== Songs ==
Opening theme

- "Gaoranger Roar!!" (ガオレンジャー吼えろ!!, Gaorenjā Hoero!!)
  - Lyrics: Nagae Kuwabara
  - Composition & Arrangement: Kōtarō Nakagawa
  - Artist: Yukio Yamagata
- "Gaoranger Roar!! (All Cast Version)" (ガオレンジャー吼えろ!!(オール・キャスト・ヴァージョン), Gaorenjā Hoero!! (Ōru Kyasto Vājon))
  - Lyrics: Nagae Kuwabara
  - Composition & Arrangement: Kōtarō Nakagawa
  - Artist: The Gaorangers
  - Used as movie opening and the ending of the Quest 45

Ending themes

- "Healing You" (ヒーリン'ユー, Hīrin' Yū) (1–44, 46–50)
  - Lyrics: Nagae Kuwabara
  - Composition & Arrangement: Keiichi Oku
  - Artist: Salia
- "The Stairway to the Sky" (大空への階段, Ōzora e no Kaidan) (51)
  - Lyrics: Chieko Suzaki (洲崎 千恵子, Suzaki Chieko)
  - Composition & Arrangement: Kōichirō Kameyama
  - Artist: The Gaorangers
  - Finale Ending
