= Kazuyoshi Yokota =

Japanese anime director

Kazuyoshi Yokota (横田 和善, Yokota Kazuyoshi) (died September 7, 2011) was a Japanese anime director. His death was announced by screenwriter Nobuyuki Isshiki via Twitter. Isshiki had previously worked with Yokota on Uchūsen Sagittarius.

== Work ==
- Osomatsu-kun (episode director, 1966)
- Samurai Giants (assistant episode director, 1973)
- Heidi, Girl of the Alps (storyboards, 1974)
- Dog of Flanders (storyboards and assistant director, 1975)
- 3000 Leagues in Search of Mother (assistant director, 1976)
- Monarch: The Big Bear of Tallac (storyboards, 1977)
- Rascal the Raccoon (assistant director, 1977)
- Haikara-san ga Tōru (director and episode director, 1978)
- Anne of Green Gables (storyboards, 1979)
- The Adventures of Tom Sawyer (storyboards, 1980)
- Jarinko Chie (episode director, 1981)
- Swiss Family Robinson (storyboards, 1981)
- Manga Aesop Monogatari (storyboards, 1983)
- Manga Nihonshi (storyboards, 1983)
- Mīmu Iro Iro Yume no Tabi (director, 1983)
- Uchūsen Sagittarius (director, storyboards, 1986)
- Grimm's Fairy Tale Classics (storyboards, animation director, 1987)
- Dagon in the Lands of Weeds (director, 1988)
- Osomatsu-kun 2 (storyboards and unit director, 1988)
- My Daddy Long Legs (director, 1990)
- The Mischievous Twins (storyboards, 1991)
- Jeanie with the Light Brown Hair (storyboards, 1992)
- Yamato Takeru (episode director, 1994)
- Devil Lady (storyboard, 1998)
- Super Doll Licca-chan (episode director, 1999)
- Cosmo Warrior Zero (director and storyboard, 2001)
- Sonic X (storyboards and episode director, 2003)
- Zoids Fuzors (episode director, 2003)
- Peach Girl (episode director, 2005)
- To Heart 2 (storyboard, unit director, 2005)
- Happiness! (episode director, 2006)
