= Noboru Kaneko =

Japanese actor

- 金子 昇
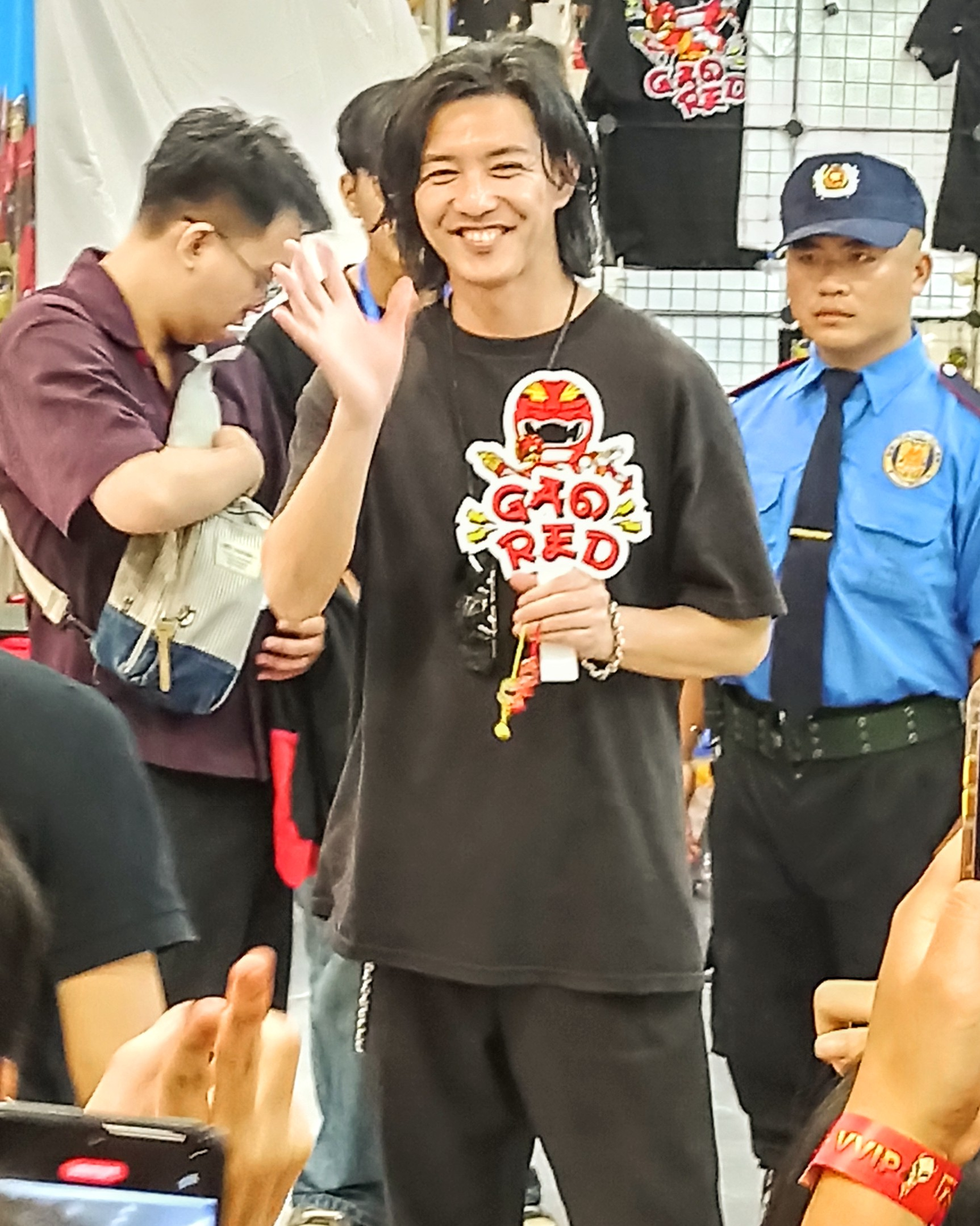
- Kaneko in July 2023 in a comic con in Ho Chi Minh City, Vietnam
- Born: October 18, 1974 (age 51); Nagasaki, Nagasaki Prefecture, Japan
- Occupation: Actor
- Years active: 1999–present
- Known for: Kakeru Shishi / Gao Red in Hyakujuu Sentai Gaoranger
- Height: 178 cm (5 ft 10 in)
- Children: 3
- Website: Kaneko on Instagram

Noboru Kaneko (金子 昇, Kaneko Noboru; born October 18, 1974, in Nagasaki, Nagasaki Prefecture, Japan) is a Japanese actor who is previously affiliated with Oscar Promotion. He graduated from the Nagasaki Institute of Applied Science University High School and then from the Department of Architecture in the Faculty of Engineering of the Nagasaki Institute of Applied Science. He is best known for his role as Kakeru Shishi / Gao Red in Hyakujuu Sentai Gaoranger.

== Personal life ==
Kaneko has been married since 2001 during the airing period of Gaoranger and became a father of three children.

== Filmography ==
=== Television ===
Year	Title	Role	Network	Notes	Ref.
1999	Woman Doctor		Yomiuri TV		
2001	Mirai Sentai Timeranger	Gao Red (Voice)	TV Asahi	"Super Sentai Big Gathering (Special Compilation)"	
2001–2002	Hyakujuu Sentai Gaoranger	Kakeru Shishi / Gao Red	TV Asahi	Lead role	
2002	You're Under Arrest	Shunsuke Okabayashi	TV Asahi		
2004	Ōoku	Hayato Nakarai	Fuji TV	First chapter	
2004	Wonderful Life	Koji Kusakabe	Fuji TV		
2004	Stained Glass	Masato Tani	SBS		
2005	Jōō	Tatsuya Nishizaki	TV Tokyo		
2005	Ruri no Shima	Tatsuya Kawashima	NTV		
2011	Kaizoku Sentai Gokaiger	Kakeru Shishi	TV Asahi	Episode: "The Lion, Runs"	
2019	4 Week Continuous Special Super Sentai Strongest Battle!!	Kakeru Shishi / Gao Red	TV Asahi	Guest star (Episodes 1 & 2)	
2022	Short Program	Mr. Komiyama	Amazon Prime Video	Episode: "Subject - Wakaba"	
2023	AIBOU: Tokyo Detective Duo	Kosuke Yazaki	TV Asahi	Episode: "The Light and Shadow of Youth"	
2024	Bakuage Sentai Boonboomger	Jyo's father	TV Asahi	Episode: "The Immeasurable Man"	

=== Film ===
Year	Title	Role	Notes	Ref.
2001	Hyakujuu Sentai Gaoranger vs. Super Sentai	Kakeru Shishi / Gao Red	Lead role	
2001	Hyakujuu Sentai Gaoranger: The Fire Mountain Roars	Kakeru Shishi / Gao Red	Lead role	
2002	Muscle Heat	Ken Ishibashi		
2003	Ninpuu Sentai Hurricaneger vs. Gaoranger	Kakeru Shishi / Gao Red	Lead role	
2003	Godzilla: Tokyo S.O.S.	Yoshito Chujo	Lead role	
2005	Cromartie High School	Hokuto		
2015	125 Years Memory	Yamamoto		
2016	Tenshi ni I'm Fine			
2018	Usuke Boys			
2022	Haiiro no Kabe	Sawamura		

=== Stage shows ===
Year	Title	Role	Notes	Ref.
2021	Kikai Sentai Zenkaiger vs. Hyakujuu Sentai Gaoranger Special Battle Stage	Kakeru Shishi / Gao Red	Lead role	
