= Takeru Shibaki =

Japanese actor and voice actor

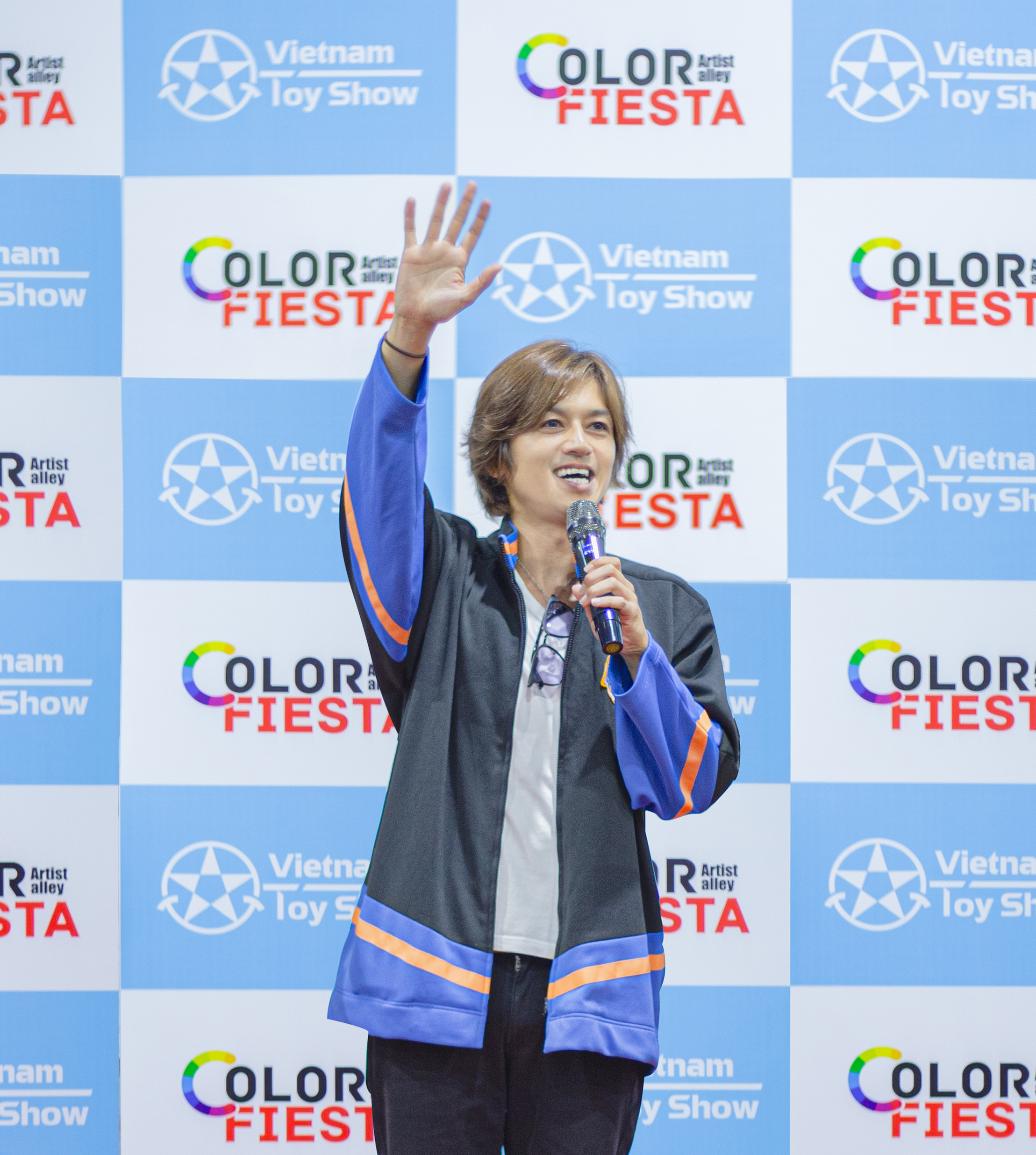
- Takeru Shibaki at Vietnam Toy Show
- Born: Tokyo, Japan
- Occupations: Actor, voice actor
- Years active: 2000–present
- Height: 174 cm (5 ft 9 in)

Takeru Shibaki (柴木 丈瑠, Shibaki Takeru) is a Japanese actor and voice actor from Tokyo. He is best known for his role as Kai Samezu/GaoBlue in the Super Sentai series Hyakujuu Sentai Gaoranger.

== Filmography ==
=== Television ===
- Hyakujuu Sentai Gaoranger (2001–2002) (Kai Samezu/Gao Blue)
- GoGo Sentai Boukenger (Ragi)
- Denace (2006)

=== Video games ===
- Grandia 3 (Ull/Ulf)

=== Film ===
- Boogiepop and Others (2000)
- Hyakujuu Sentai Gaoranger vs. Super Sentai (2001) (Kai Samezu/Gao Blue)
- Hyakujuu Sentai Gaoranger Fire Mountain Roars (2001) (Kai Samezu/Gao Blue)
- Battle Royale II: Requiem (2003) (Shugo Urabe)
- Hirakata (Takahito Murata)
- Reflections (2005)
- Boku no Kanojo tosono Kareshi ~Drop In Ghost~ (2007) (Ryo Fuuma)

=== Stage shows ===
- Kikai Sentai Zenkaiger vs. Hyakujuu Sentai Gaoranger Special Battle Stage (2021) (Kai Samezu/Gao Blue)
