= Anne of Windy Poplars =

1936 novel by Lucy Maud Montgomery

- First edition
- Author: Lucy Maud Montgomery
- Language: English
- Series: Anne of Green Gables
- Genre: Children's novel
- Publisher: McClelland and Stewart (Canada); Frederick A. Stokes Company (US)
- Publication date: August, 1936
- Publication place: Canada
- Media type: Print (Hardcover)
- Preceded by: Rilla of Ingleside
- Followed by: Anne of Ingleside
- Text: Anne of Windy Poplars online

Anne of Windy Poplars—published as Anne of Windy Willows in the UK, Australia and Japan—is an epistolary novel by Canadian author L. M. Montgomery. First published in 1936 by McClelland and Stewart, it details Anne Shirley's experiences while serving as principal of a high school in Summerside, Prince Edward Island over three years. A large portion of the novel is presented through letters Anne writes to her fiancé, Gilbert Blythe. Chronologically, the book is fourth in the series, but it was the seventh book written.

The book's United States copyright was renewed in 1963.

== Plot ==
The novel takes place over the three years between Anne's graduation from Redmond College and her courtship to Gilbert Blythe. While Gilbert is in medical school, Anne takes a job as the principal of Summerside High School, where she also teaches. She lives in a beautiful house called Windy Poplars with two elderly widows, Aunt Kate and Aunt Chatty, their housekeeper, Rebecca Dew, and their cat, Dusty Miller.

During this time, Anne must win over the clannish Pringle family, as well as her icy vice-principal, Katherine Brooke. Along the way, she meets many of Summerside's more eccentric residents and becomes involved in helping many romances, which do not always turn out as planned. She also befriends the lonely Elizabeth Grayson, a motherless member of the Pringle family who lives next door to Windy Poplars. She frequently visits Marilla Cuthbert at Green Gables.

At the end of the novel, Anne departs Summerside to return to Avonlea for her wedding to Gilbert. Many of the town's residents express their appreciation for how she has helped them over the years, including Katherine Brooke and Elizabeth Grayson.

== Characters ==
- Anne Shirley - Moving from Green Gables in Avonlea to Windy Poplars in Summerside, Anne takes a job as principal of Summerside High School while her fiancé Gilbert finishes medical school. Over three years, she must win over the snobbish Pringles who rule the town, befriend the resentful vice-principal, and help the lonely girl who lives next door.
- Aunt Kate MacComber - The owner of Windy Poplars who was previously married to a splendid sea captain. Aunt Kate is the sort of woman like Marilla Cuthbert: austere, solemn, proper. She disapproves of reading novels and playing cards, both of which Aunt Chatty particularly enjoyed.
- Aunt Charlotte "Chatty" MacLean - A sweet and frivolous old widow at Windy Poplars who likes to read novels and play cards. Aunt Chatty had once been a very pretty woman, but her bloom vanished as soon as she grew old. She is excessively sensitive, easily moved to tears over trivial matters.
- Rebecca Dew - The housekeeper at Windy Poplars. She is industrious and responsible as her priority is keeping the house clean. Despite her lacking in academic study, Rebecca is very experienced in housekeeping and giving household advice. She is also generous-hearted as she prepared voluntary meals for a poor student every Sunday and brought up Dusty Miller.
- Elizabeth Grayson - A lonely and unhappy 8-year-old girl who lives next door to Windy Poplars. Her mother died when she was born and her father works abroad. Little Elizabeth dreams about "Tomorrow" and changes her name based on her mood.
- Mrs. Campbell - Little Elizabeth's cold and unloving great-grandmother.
- Martha Monkman - Mrs. Campbell's elderly maid. Better known as "the Woman", she is just as strict and cruel as her employer, telling Elizabeth that "Tomorrow" will never come.
- Katherine Brooke - The sarcastic and bitter vice-principal of Summerside High School. She wanted the principal job and resents Anne for getting it. However, she was eventually won over by Anne’s kindness and sympathy. After that, she became an ambitious, genteel woman.
- Jen Pringle - A student at Summerside High School who is highly intelligent but dislikes Anne and causes trouble in class.
- Sophy Sinclair - A non-Pringle student in Anne's class. She is a plain and quiet girl who longs to play Mary, Queen of Scots in the school play.
- Lewis Allen - An orphaned pupil who does housework to pay for his board.
- Ellen Pringle - An elegant and sweet-looking woman who lives with her sister in a mansion called Maplehurst.
- Sarah Pringle - Miss Ellen's sister who bosses the entire Pringle clan.
- Pierce Grayson - Little Elizabeth's distant father who moved to Paris after his wife died.
- Valentine Courtaloe - The local dressmaker who knows everything about everyone in Summerside, living and dead.
- Trix Taylor - A jolly twenty-year-old who seeks Anne's help when her father's attitude threatens her sister's engagement.
- Esme Taylor - Trix's sweet, timid sister who is madly in love with a college professor and fears he will not propose because of her family.
- Cyrus Taylor- The father of Trix and Esme who is prone to sulky fits.
- Dr. Lennox Carter - A modern languages professor at Redmond College and the object of Esme's affection.
- Mrs. Gibson - A demanding eighty-year-old who is waited on hand and foot by her timid, middle-aged daughter Pauline.
- Pauline Gibson - Mrs. Gibson's daughter who takes care of her and dares not do anything without asking her mother.
- Nora Nelson - The last of six sisters to be single who fought with one of her former sweethearts and fears she may never marry.
- Jim Wilcox - Nora's suitor whom she has dated on and off for four years.
- Hazel Marr - A newcomer in Summerside who does not love her wealthy beau enough to marry him.
- Terry Garland - Hazel's beau who considers their engagement to be nothing more than childish nonsense.
- Mrs. Raymond - The mother of Gerald and Geraldine, eight-year-old twins whom Anne looks after while Mrs. Raymond attends a funeral.
- Geraldine Raymond - The daughter of Mrs. Raymond and Gerald's twin sister.
- Gerald Raymond - The son of Mrs. Raymond and Geraldine's twin brother.
- Ivy Trent - A girl whom the Raymond twins dislike. She never does wrong and loves to show off her immaculate clothes.
- Sibyl "Dovie" Westcott - A pretty, likeable 19-year-old girl whom Anne convinces to elope against her father's wishes.
- Jarvis Morrow - A successful young lawyer and Dovie's fiancé who cannot win her father's approval.
- Franklin Westcott - Dovie's somber, widowed father who has never allowed his daughter to have any suitors.
- Minerva Tomgallon- The last remaining member of her family who lives alone and rarely goes out except to church. She invites Anne over for dinner and tells her the tragic lives of her relatives.

== Series ==
Montgomery continued the story of Anne Shirley in a series of sequels. They are listed in the order of Anne's age in each novel.

Lucy Maud Montgomery's books featuring Anne Shirley
#	Book	Date published	Anne Shirley's age
1	Anne of Green Gables	1908	11-16
2	Anne of Avonlea	1909	16-18
3	Anne of the Island	1915	18-22
4	Anne of Windy Poplars	1936	22-25
5	Anne's House of Dreams	1917	25-27
6	Anne of Ingleside	1939	34-40
7	Rainbow Valley	1919	41
8	Rilla of Ingleside	1921	49-53

Related books in which Anne Shirley plays a lesser part
#	Book	Date published	Anne Shirley's age
—	Chronicles of Avonlea	1912	-
—	Further Chronicles of Avonlea	1920	-
—	The Blythes Are Quoted	2009	-

== Windy Poplars vs Windy Willows ==
Montgomery's original title for the book was Anne of Windy Willows, but her US publisher requested that she change the title because of the title's similarities to The Wind in the Willows. Additionally, her publisher requested some cuts to the book, mainly for perceived gory or terrifying content. Montgomery complied, and the edited novel was published in the United States and Canada as Anne of Windy Poplars. Her UK publisher, however, did not see the need for the edits and published the unabridged version under the original title, Anne of Windy Willows.

== Adaptations ==
A film version of the novel, the sequel to the 1934 film Anne of Green Gables, was released in 1940 with the return of Anne Shirley (formerly billed as Dawn O'Day). The film recorded a loss of $176,000.

This novel also serves as the primary source for the television mini-series Anne of Green Gables: The Sequel (1987).
