= Anne & Gilbert =

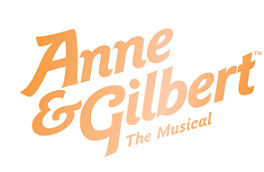
- Music: Jeff Hochhauser; Nancy White; Bob Johnston
- Lyrics: Jeff Hochhauser; Nancy White; Bob Johnston
- Book: Jeff Hochhauser; Nancy White; Bob Johnston
- Basis: Anne of Avonlea and Anne of the Island by Lucy Maud Montgomery
- Productions: 2005 Victoria–by-the-Sea; 2006–2012 Summerside; 2007 Thousand Islands Playhouse; 2013–present Charlottetown; 2015 National Arts Centre

Anne & Gilbert is a musical based on Lucy Maud Montgomery's books Anne of Avonlea (1909) and Anne of the Island (1915), the second and third books in the Anne of Green Gables series. The musical is adapted by Jeff Hochhauser, Nancy White, and Bob Johnston.

== Plot ==
The show closely follows the plot of the books, with only a few alterations and cuts for length. The first act is based on Anne of Avonlea, and the second on Anne of the Island.

During the course of the first act, Gilbert Blythe gives up the position of Avonlea Schoolmaster for Anne Shirley, allowing her to stay close to home to care for her adoptive mother, Marilla Cuthbert. It is revealed that almost all of Avonlea knows that Gilbert is deeply in love with Anne, and she with him, although Anne will not admit it. In return for the kindness he has done her, Anne agrees to a wager with Gil; he will propose to her at some day of his choosing, and if she says no he will never ask again. After some time, Anne's best friend Diana Barry becomes engaged to her beau, Fred Wright and at the end of the first act, marries him. Gilbert takes advantage of his wager with Anne and proposes to her following the wedding, but she rejects him. He vows never to propose again. Through a series of fortuitous events, Anne is finally able to follow her dreams and go to Redmond University.

The second act opens with Anne of the Island, introducing several new friends for Anne. Meanwhile, Anne falls in love with a millionaire named Royal Gardner much to the dismay of Marilla and Diana back home in Avonlea. Although she toys with the idea of marrying Roy, she finally decides that she does not truly love him and rejects his proposal. Roy storms off and is not seen again. Gilbert, who is paying his way through University with odd jobs, happens to be working as a waiter at the restaurant where Anne and Roy are. He gives Anne an early birthday gift in the form of three letters her parents left behind before they died. As she reads the letters she begins to realize that she truly can love somebody, and finally finds the love she has had for Gilbert all along.

The show ends with Anne proposing to Gilbert back home in Avonlea for the summer, as the entire town and several friends from Redmond look on.

== Songs ==
The original musical comprised twenty eight songs over two acts, but is most often sold and performed today in fifteen. The complete list of songs is as follows:

Act 1

1. Mr. Blythe*
2. Gilbert Loves Anne of Green Gables*
3. Averil's Ideal*
4. Carried Away By Love*
5. You're Island Through and Through*
6. Polishing Silver
7. Saturday Morning*
8. Hello, Gilbert!*
9. All You Can Do Is Wait*
10. A Jonah Day
11. Our Duty*
12. Averil's Ideal (Reprise)*
13. Someone Handed Me the Moon*
14. Blessed Be the Avonlea Bride
15. Carried Away By Love (Reprise)

Act 2

1. The Days Ahead*
2. Seesaw Girl
3. When He Was My Beau*
4. May I Offer My Umbrella?
5. Gilbert Would Never Compose A Sonnet To My Eyes*
6. You're Never Safe From Surprises Till You're Dead
7. Hello Gilbert (Reprise) - DISCONTINUTED SONG
8. Hothouse Flower*
9. Just When I'd Given Up Hope
10. You're Island Through and Through (Reprise)
11. That Little Fiddle Player
12. Forever In My Life
13. Finale

== Performances ==
Anne & Gilbert opened in August 2005 at the Victoria Playhouse in Victoria–By-the-Sea, Prince Edward Island, directed and choreographed by Duncan MacIntosh. In 2006, the production moved to the Harbourfront Theatre in Summerside, maintaining much of the original cast. The show continued to run at the Harbourfront each summer season until 2012, entering its seventh season with returning actors Amy Reitsma and Aaron Kyte in the title roles. The original production continues to run in Charlottetown, having moved to the Guild Theatre starting in 2013. A scaled-down production was staged during the COVID-19 pandemic, with a limited cast performing songs from the musical. The musical is performed regularly on the Island to this day.

The production played for the first time outside of Prince Edward Island and for the first time by an amateur troupe at Catholic Central High School in Lethbridge, Alberta in early 2007.

A second professional production at The Thousand Islands Playhouse in July–August 2007 was directed by Greg Wanless, music-directed by Sandy Thorburn, and choreographed by Kiri-Lyn Muir. A tour of Ontario took place in 2008.

In December 2015, Anne & Gilbert was performed at Canada's National Arts Centre in Ottawa. Ellen Denny returned to her role as Anne Shirley, and Gilbert Blythe was played by Alex Furber. The production was very successful, with an additional two productions added to the initial run.

Anne & Gilbert has been performed at the Florence Simmons Performance Hall in Charlottetown since 2022, with Rebekah Brown and Greysen LaPointe as the lead roles, and with direction under Wade Lynch and choreography under MacKenzie Cutcliffe.
