= Rainbow Valley =

1919 novel by Lucy Maud Montgomery

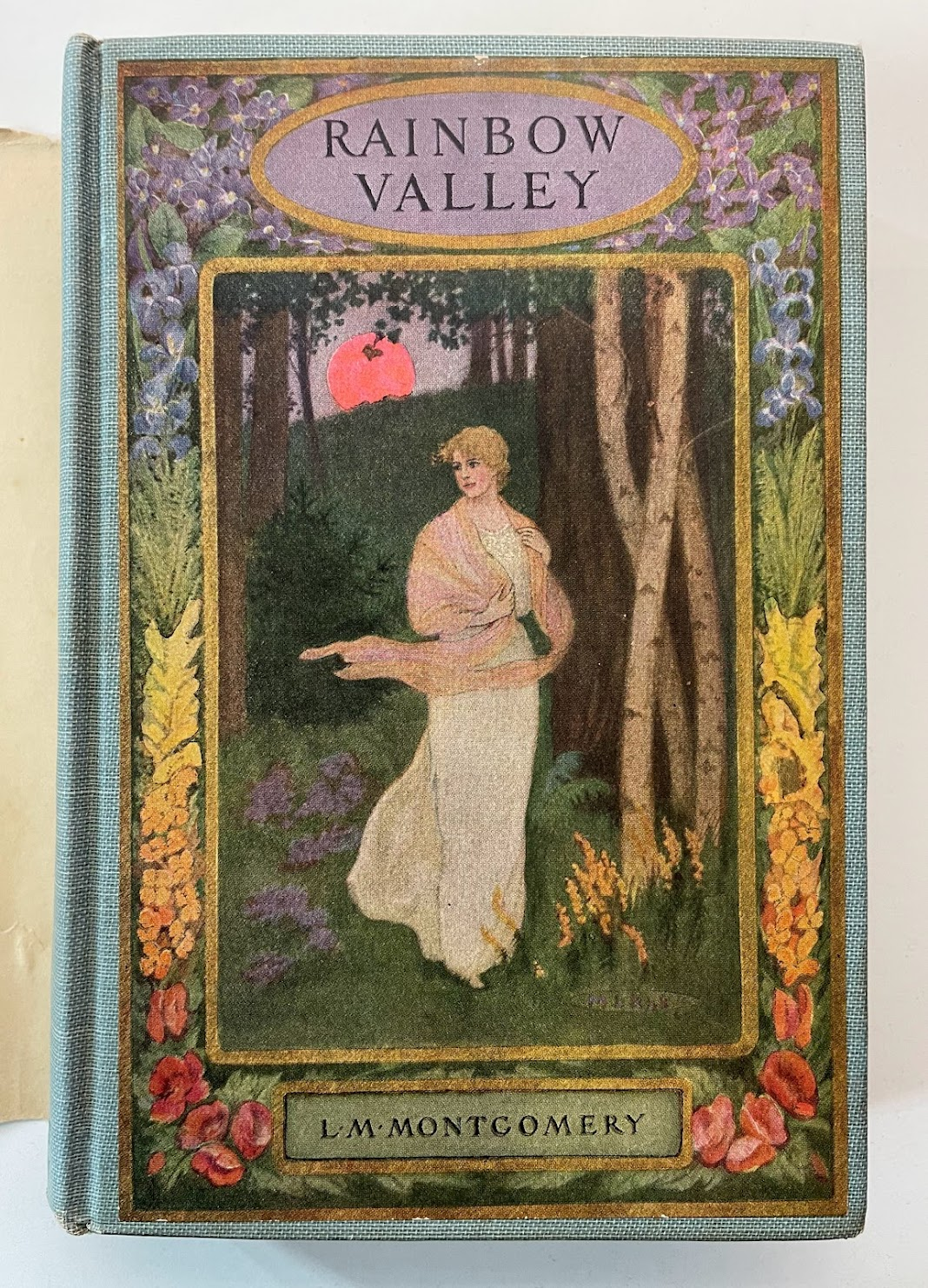
- First edition
- Author: Lucy Maud Montgomery
- Illustrator: M. L. Kirk
- Language: English
- Series: Anne of Green Gables
- Genre: Children's Literature
- Publisher: McClelland & Stewart (Canada); Frederick A. Stokes (US)
- Publication date: August, 1919
- Publication place: Canada
- Media type: Print (hardback & paperback)
- Preceded by: Anne's House of Dreams
- Followed by: Rilla of Ingleside
- Text: Rainbow Valley at Wikisource

Rainbow Valley is the seventh book in the chronology of the Anne of Green Gables series of novels by Lucy Maud Montgomery published in 1919, although it was the fifth book published. Whereas Anne Shirley was the main protagonist of the previous books, this novel focuses more on her six children and their interactions with the children of Anne's new neighbour and Presbyterian minister John Meredith. The work draws heavily on Montgomery's own life in the Leaskdale Manse, where she wrote a large number of her books.

The book is dedicated: "To the memory of Goldwin Lapp, Robert Brookes and Morley Shier who made the supreme sacrifice that the happy valleys of their home land might be kept sacred from the ravage of the invader." This refers to World War I, which is the main theme of the next and final book in the series, Rilla of Ingleside.

== Plot summary ==
Anne Shirley has now been married to Gilbert Blythe for 15 years, and the couple have six children: Jem, Walter, Nan, Di, Shirley, and Rilla.

After a trip to London, Anne returns to the news that a new minister has arrived in Glen St. Mary. John Meredith is a widower with four young children: Gerald (Jerry), Faith, Una, and Thomas Carlyle (Carl). The children have not been properly brought up since the death of their mother, with only their father (who is easily absorbed by matters of theology) to parent them. The children are considered wild and mischievous by many of the families in the village (who tend only to hear about the Meredith children when they have got into some kind of scrape), causing them to question Mr. Meredith's parenting skills and his suitability as a minister.

For most of the book, only the Blythes know of the Meredith children's loyalty and kindness. They rescue an orphaned girl, Mary Vance, from starvation, and Una finds a home for her with Mrs. Marshall Elliott (Miss Cornelia Bryant). When the children get into trouble, Faith sometimes tries to explain their behaviour to the townsfolk, which generally causes an even bigger scandal.

The Merediths, Blythes, and Mary Vance often play in a hollow called Rainbow Valley, which becomes a gathering place for the children in the book. Jem Blythe tries to help the Merediths behave better by forming the "Good-Conduct Club," in which the Merediths punish themselves for misdeeds. Their self-imposed punishments lead to Carl becoming very ill with pneumonia after spending hours in a graveyard on a wet night, and to Una fainting in church after fasting all day. When this happens, John Meredith is wracked with guilt over his failings as a father.

Mr. Meredith realizes that he should marry again and give the children a mother, though he has always thought he will never love anyone again as he did his late wife. He is surprised to find that he has fallen in love with Rosemary West, a woman in her late thirties who lives with her sister Ellen, who is ten years older. John proposes marriage to Rosemary, but Ellen forbids Rosemary from accepting, as years earlier they had promised each other never to leave the other following the deaths of their parents. However, Ellen eventually reunites with her childhood beau, Norman Douglas, who asks Rosemary to release Ellen from her promise so she can marry Norman. Rosemary agrees, but now thinks that John Meredith hates her.

Una overhears her father expressing feelings for Rosemary and goes to ask Rosemary to marry her father despite her misgivings about stepmothers, who Mary Vance has told her are always mean. Rosemary sets her mind at ease and agrees to speak to John Meredith again. They become engaged, and Rosemary and Ellen plan a double wedding in the autumn.

== Characters ==
=== The Ingleside children ===
James Matthew "Jem" Blythe: Jem is named for Captain Jim and Anne's foster parent Matthew Cuthbert, or as Anne puts it, "The two finest gentlemen [she knows], not even saving Gilbert's presence." The only one of Anne's children born in the House of Dreams, Jem has curly red hair, frank hazel eyes, his mother's nose and his father's mouth. Jem is also the only one with ears nice enough to please Susan. He is sturdy and reliable, not a great talker but a good all-round student. Jem likes to investigate things through, and constantly experiments and observes. This leads him to know a lot about nature, people and the little world the children live in. He is a "chieftain" at school and brought about the 'Good-Conduct Club' with the Manse children. Towards the end of the book, Jem is studying for the entrance to Queen's and, being almost fifteen, does not have as much enthusiasm for playing in Rainbow Valley anymore. However, he likes to fraternize with Faith Meredith. Jem is Marilla's favourite of Anne's children and seems to be closest to Nan.

Walter Cuthbert Blythe: Walter is named after Anne's late birth father and adoptive family, Cuthbert, and is considered the most handsome of the children. He has straight black hair and finely modeled features. Walter is thought of by the Glen St. Mary boys as girly and milky-soppish, because he never fights and rarely plays sports, preferring to read books alone. The Meredith children like Walter well, but Mary Vance finds him odd. Walter has all his mother's vivid imagination and love for beauty, and dreams of becoming a poet someday, choosing Paul Irving, one of his mother's pupils, as a model. He shares many of his verses to his sister-chum, Di. The boys at school respect Walter because of his "book talk", and all the more when he fights Dan Reese after Dan insulted Walter, his mother and his friend Faith. At the close of the book he has a vision of 'The Piper' on the hill, piping away, making young men follow him from around the world. This vision is fulfilled in the following book as World War One breaks out.

Anne "Nan" Blythe: One of the Ingleside twins, Nan is "Blythe by name and blithe by nature", being a dainty little maiden with velvety nut-brown eyes and silky nut-brown hair. Her complexion is almost flawless, and she is well aware of this. She has many friends, but is thought to be stuck up and proud by the Glen St. Mary ladies because she imitates her mother's tricks, graces and poses. Nan also inherited her mother's imagination, which makes life more interesting, and also gets her into numerous scrapes. "Nan" is named after her mother. She seems to have her eyes on Jerry Meredith, of the Manse. Nan looks like her Grandmother Blythe.

Diana "Di" Blythe: Diana is the other Ingleside twin, named after Anne's childhood friend, Diana. She looks a lot like her mother, with red hair and gray-green eyes. She is special chums with her brother Walter, who tells her his secrets and lets her read his poetry. Di is like her father, with similar qualities and personality, having his practical bent and common sense, as well as his twinkling sense of humour. Diana, like her mother before her, regrets her hair colour and wishes her hair was like Nan's. She is very chummy and likes to have a named best friend, which causes several unfortunate events, but she is also quite loyal to her brothers and sisters. As her nickname comes from "Diana", it is pronounced "Die", not "Dee".

Shirley Blythe: Anne was very sick after giving birth to Shirley, so the Blythe housekeeper, Susan Baker, took care of him until Anne was well. Shirley goes to Susan to have his bruises kissed and his cuts washed. Shirley is quiet and doesn't like to be forced to talk, preferring to play on his own. He is known as the little brown boy, because he has brown eyes, hair and skin. He is also seen as taking after Gilbert's father, John, in personality. Shirley was named for Anne's maiden name.

Bertha Marilla "Rilla" Blythe: The youngest of the Ingleside children, Rilla is named after Anne's late birth mother Bertha and her deceased adoptive "mother" Marilla Cuthbert. She was born a roly-poly plump baby, and remained so until she was seven. She has red hair like her mother and maternal grandfather, which turns a ruddy-brown color when she grows older, and hazel eyes like her father. Rilla is very proud, hates to be teased or to be grouped with lower-class people. She has had a crush on Kenneth Ford since age six. Rilla has childish beliefs and ideas, and a fear of being unladylike. She has a lisp, which her mother believes she will grow out of. Later in life, the lisp only comes back when Rilla is nervous or emotional. In her teens, Rilla resents her nickname, wishing that everyone would use her respectable and "dignified" first name, Bertha, instead of Rilla or even worse "Spider" (which her brothers invented because she had a significant growth spurt in her early teens, leaving her with long arms and legs). Rilla isn't ambitious like the rest of Anne's children, and at the beginning of Rilla of Ingleside she states that her only intention is to have a good time. At the end of the book, however, Rilla has matured into a practical, accomplished young woman through helping her mother and Susan with the war effort.

=== The Manse children ===
Gerald "Jerry" Meredith - Jerry is twelve in the beginning of the book and has his father's black hair and large black eyes, but in him they are flashing instead of dreamy. He has a great sense of self-judgment and is described as being very smart, 'the brightest of all the children in the Glen school'. He is good friends with Jem and Walter. He seems to have a crush on Nan. He is very close to Faith.

Faith Meredith - She is eleven when the book begins. Faith is described as wearing her beauty like a rose, careless and glowing. She has golden-brown curls, crimson cheeks, and golden-brown eyes. She is optimistic, laughs a lot, and has a rather different way of thinking. Faith had a pet rooster named Adam, but he was killed by old aunt Martha and eaten at a special dinner with another minister that night. The bird was eventually replaced by a canary, given to her by Rosemary West. She seems to have a crush on Jem and is great friends with Nan. Faith is also very heedless, and when the Merediths start their 'Good-Conduct Club', Faith seems to be the one who has to be punished most frequently. The Good Conduct Club was a program the children made to punish themselves for any of their actions that could either hurt them, hurt others, or make their family look bad at church. The club eventually died out because the Manse children began to punish themselves in unreasonable ways for actions that weren't very unreasonable (e.g. Carl was afraid of a "ghost" and he had to sit out in the rainy graveyard until 12:00 p.m.) She is known for previously wearing no stockings to church after having given her good pair to a poor girl, and refusing to wear her hideous red-and-blue striped ones as a punishment from the club. She is closest to Jerry.

Una Meredith - Una is ten when the book begins. She is little and dreamy, like her father. She has straight pure black hair and almond-shaped dark blue eyes, with something sad about them. Her mouth sometimes falls open to reveal tiny square teeth and sometimes a shy smile creeps over her face. She is sensitive to public opinion, and is the only one who tries to keep the house clean and neat. Una is said to have an uneasy consciousness that there was something strange about her way of living, and longs to put it right, but doesn't know how. She misses her mother more than her siblings do and seems to have a little fancy for Walter. She is for sure the most thoughtful and caring of the Manse children. She is very frail and weak, and once fainted in church.

Thomas Carlyle "Carl" Meredith - Carl has the fearless, direct, clear blue eyes of his dead mother and brown hair with glints of gold. He is nine at the beginning of the book, and has a fancy for and curiosity towards bugs and animals. He often takes these to his bed or puts them in his pockets. Anne says she believes he will be an environmentalist. Carl has been known to be seriously ill many times, once on the brink of death.

Mary Vance - Mary is a cheeky girl, with tow-colored hair and light blue eyes which the Meredith children call 'white eyes'. Found by the Meredith children in a barn, they take her home and look after her. She is later adopted by Miss Cornelia. Mary is about twelve when she is introduced in the book. She had previously lived with a horrid Mrs. Wiley who whipped her until she ran away. The Manse and Blythe children don't have a terribly strong liking for her, but they 'can't help being nice to her'. They are very much in awe of her boasting and swearing frequently.

== Series ==
Montgomery continued the story of Anne Shirley in a series of sequels. They are listed in the order of Anne's age in each novel.

Lucy Maud Montgomery's books on Anne Shirley
#	Book	Date published	Anne Shirley's age
1	Anne of Green Gables	1908	11 — 16
2	Anne of Avonlea	1909	16 — 18
3	Anne of the Island	1915	18 — 22
4	Anne of Windy Poplars	1936	22 — 25
5	Anne's House of Dreams	1917	25 — 27
6	Anne of Ingleside	1939	34 — 40
7	Rainbow Valley	1919	40 — 42
8	Rilla of Ingleside	1921	48 — 52

Related books in which Anne Shirley plays a lesser part
#	Book	Date published	Anne Shirley's age
—	Chronicles of Avonlea	1912	—
—	Further Chronicles of Avonlea	1920	—
—	The Blythes Are Quoted	2009	—
