= Anne's House of Dreams =

1917 novel by Lucy Maud Montgomery

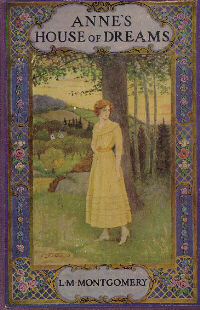
- First edition
- Author: Lucy Maud Montgomery
- Illustrator: M. L. Kirk
- Language: English
- Series: Anne of Green Gables
- Publisher: McClelland, Goodchild and Stewart (Canada); Frederick A. Stokes Company (US)
- Publication date: August, 1917
- Publication place: Canada
- Media type: Print (Hardcover)
- Preceded by: Anne of the Island
- Followed by: Rainbow Valley
- Text: Anne's House of Dreams at Wikisource

Anne's House of Dreams is a novel by Canadian author Lucy Maud Montgomery. It was first published in 1917 by McClelland, Goodchild and Stewart. The fifth in a series of eight, the book chronicles Anne Shirley's early married life as she and her sweetheart, Gilbert Blythe, begin to build their life together in Four Winds, Prince Edward Island.

== Plot summary ==
The book begins with Anne and Gilbert's wedding, which takes place in the Green Gables orchard. After the wedding, they move to their first home together, which Anne calls their "house of dreams". Gilbert finds them a small house on the seashore at Four Winds Point, an area near the village of Glen St. Mary, where he is to take over his uncle's medical practice.

In Four Winds, Anne and Gilbert meet many interesting people, such as Captain Jim, a former sailor who is now the keeper of the lighthouse, and Miss Cornelia Bryant, an unmarried woman in her 40s who lives alone in an emerald-green house and deems the Blythes part of "the race that knows Joseph". Anne also meets her new neighbour, Leslie Moore, who lost her beloved brother at the age of 12 and her father at 14, and then was forced by her mother to marry the mean-spirited and unscrupulous Dick Moore at 16. She felt free for a year or so after Dick disappeared on a sea voyage, but Captain Jim happened upon him in Cuba and brought him home, amnesiac, brain-damaged and generally helpless, and now dependent on Leslie like a "big baby". Leslie becomes friends with Anne, but is sometimes bitter towards her because she is so happy and free, when Leslie can never have that.

Anne's former guardian Marilla Cuthbert visits her occasionally and still plays an important role in her life. Marilla is present when Anne gives birth to her first child, Joyce, who dies shortly after birth (as Montgomery's second son did). After the baby's death, Anne and Leslie become closer as Leslie feels that Anne now understands tragedy and pain—as Leslie puts it, her happiness, although still great, is no longer perfect, so there is less of a gulf between them.

Later in the story, Leslie rents a room in her house to a writer named Owen Ford, who is the grandson of the former owners of Anne's House of Dreams, the Selwyns. Owen, who is looking to write the Great Canadian Novel, finds the inspiration he was looking for in Captain Jim's shipboard diary, and transforms it into "The Life-Book of Captain Jim". While Owen is finishing the novel, he and Leslie independently realize they have feelings for each other, but both know they cannot do anything about them. Owen leaves the Island and Leslie is even more miserable being trapped in her marriage to Dick.

Gilbert examines Dick Moore and suspects that if Dick underwent surgery on his skull, he might recover his faculties. Anne and Miss Cornelia are both opposed to the surgery, fearing that Leslie's life will become infinitely harder if Dick returns to himself, but Gilbert feels obligated to let Leslie know there is a chance for Dick. Leslie consents, and Dick undergoes the surgery in Montreal; when he awakens, he reveals that he is actually Dick's cousin George, who accompanied Dick to Cuba and was with him when Dick died of yellow fever twelve years before. George resembles Dick strongly because their fathers were brothers and their mothers were sisters, and both had the same peculiar eye colouring abnormality (heterochromia) by which Captain Jim recognized "Dick" in Cuba years before.

Leslie, abruptly set free by this news, returns home, and considers taking a nursing course to get on with her life. Owen Ford returns to the Island to court Leslie after Miss Cornelia informs him of what has happened, and they become engaged. While this is going on, Anne gives birth to her second child, a healthy son. He is named James Matthew, for Anne's guardian Matthew Cuthbert and for Captain Jim.

At the end of the book, Owen Ford's book is published, and Captain Jim dies with a smile on his face after reading his advance copy. Miss Cornelia, thought to be a confirmed spinster, announces that she has decided to marry Marshall Elliott, who may be a Grit but at least is a Presbyterian; she says she could have had him at any time but refused to marry him until he cut his long hair and shaved his long beard off, which he had refused to do for twenty years until the Grits came into power. Finally, Anne, Gilbert, Jem and their housekeeper, Susan Baker, move to the old Morgan house in the Glen, later to be named Ingleside. Anne is greatly saddened to leave the House of Dreams, but knows that the little house is outgrown and Gilbert's work as a doctor requires him to live closer to town.

This book introduces Susan Baker, the elderly spinster who is the Blythes' maid-of-all-work.

== Characters ==
- Anne Blythe (née Shirley) — The heroine. She marries Gilbert and moves in with him at the House of Dreams.
- Gilbert Blythe — A doctor who marries Anne before they move into the House of Dreams, from which he commutes for work.
- James Matthew "Jem" Blythe — Anne and Gilbert's young son, named for Captain Jim and for Matthew Cuthbert.
- James "Captain Jim" Boyd — A former sailor who minds the nearby lighthouse. He loves Leslie Moore like a daughter.
- Miss Cornelia Bryant — Anne's neighbor who despises men. Outspoken and independent middle-aged woman, who has strong and deep rooted opinions. Fervent Presbyterian. She has a warm heart and takes care of the well-being of the children of the poor families. Excellent cook, industrious sewer and skilled embroiderer.
- Marshall Elliot — A Grit that refused to shave his beard and cut his hair until the Grits became powerful in politics again. He ends up marrying Miss Cornelia, the sweetheart of his youth.
- Owen Ford — A young writer who rents Leslie Moore's extra room for one summer and falls in love with her.
- Leslie Moore (née West) — A quiet member of the town. When she was 16, her mother pressured her to marry an unpleasant man and Leslie acquiesced because her mother was to die soon. Her husband, Dick, was a drunken louse who treated everyone poorly until he went on a trip to Cuba and came back with crippling brain damage that reduced him to the capacity of a child. Forced to continue caring for him for more than a decade before the beginning of the novel, Leslie has given up on the ambitions of her childhood and resigned herself to her depressed existence. Leslie is remarkably beautiful with long golden locks well into her knees and very intelligent, but never had the opportunity to study.
- Susan Baker — Anne and Gilbert's housekeeper.

== Series ==
Montgomery continued the story of Anne Shirley in a series of sequels. They are listed in the order of Anne's age in each novel.

Lucy Maud Montgomery's books on Anne Shirley
#	Book	Date published	Anne Shirley's age
1	Anne of Green Gables	1908	11 —16
2	Anne of Avonlea	1909	16 —18
3	Anne of the Island	1915	18 —22
4	Anne of Windy Poplars	1936	22 —25
5	Anne's House of Dreams	1917	25 —27
6	Anne of Ingleside	1939	34 —40
7	Rainbow Valley	1919	41
8	Rilla of Ingleside	1921	49 —53

Related books in which Anne Shirley plays a lesser part
#	Book	Date published	Anne Shirley's age
—	Chronicles of Avonlea	1912	—
—	Further Chronicles of Avonlea	1920	—
—	The Blythes Are Quoted	2009	—
