= Anne of Ingleside =

1939 novel by Lucy Maud Montgomery

- First edition (Canada)
- Author: Lucy Maud Montgomery
- Language: English
- Series: Anne of Green Gables
- Publisher: McClelland and Stewart (Canada); George G. Harrap & Co. (UK); Frederick A. Stokes Company/Grosset & Dunlap (US)
- Publication date: July 1939
- Publication place: Canada
- Media type: Print (Hardcover)
- Preceded by: Anne of Windy Poplars
- Text: Anne of Ingleside online

Anne of Ingleside is a children's novel by Canadian author Lucy Maud Montgomery. It was first published in July 1939 by McClelland and Stewart (Toronto) and the Frederick A. Stokes Company (New York). It is the tenth of eleven books that feature the character of Anne Shirley, and Montgomery's final published novel.

Chronologically, Anne of Ingleside precedes Rainbow Valley, which was published years earlier. In addition, a short story collection The Blythes Are Quoted, written in 1941-42 but published in 2009, concludes the Anne stories.

The book's United States copyright was renewed in 1967.

== Plot summary ==
Seven years after Anne's House of Dreams, Anne visits Diana Wright and her daughter, Anne Cordelia, in Avonlea following the funeral of Gilbert's father. When she returns home to the old Morgan house, now named "Ingleside", she is greeted by her five children: James Matthew ('Jem'), the eldest, now aged seven; Walter Cuthbert, who is about six and often thought to be a bit of a 'sissy' because of his love for poetry; fraternal twins Anne ('Nan') and Diana ('Di'), who are five and look nothing alike, Nan with brown hair and hazel eyes, and Di with red hair and green eyes; and finally Shirley, two years old and Susan Baker's favourite, as she took care of him as an infant while Anne was very sick following his birth.

The book includes the dreadful, seemingly eternal visit of Gilbert's disagreeable, oversensitive aunt Mary Maria Blythe, who was only supposed to stay two weeks but lingers on for months and only leaves, much to the relief of the family, when Anne unintentionally offends her by arranging a surprise birthday party.

During the novel, which spans a period of about six years, Anne and Gilbert's youngest child is born and is named Bertha Marilla Blythe. She is also called Roly-Poly, or, generally, 'Rilla'. The novel includes a series of adventures which spotlight one of Anne's children at a time as they engage in the misunderstandings and mishaps of youth. In many of the adventures, the honest Ingleside children are taken in by children who tell lies in order to seem more interesting: Nan is deceived by a lying schoolchild into thinking that she was actually switched at birth; Walter is convinced by an older boy that his mother is dying; and Di gets two stories, in both of which she makes friends with schoolgirls who deceive her. In other stories, oldest child Jem deals with the loss of a pet, and youngest child Rilla somehow gets the idea that it is shameful to be seen carrying a cake, and goes to great lengths to avoid doing so. The Blythes' third son Shirley is present in the book, but oddly gets no solo "spotlight" story of his own, which is also the case in Rainbow Valley, the next volume in the series.

At the end of the book, Anne worries that Gilbert has grown distant and possibly doesn't love her anymore. She and Gilbert spend a disagreeable evening with the widowed and childless Christine Stuart, who was once Anne's rival (or so she thought) for Gilbert's love. Suddenly realizing how tired Gilbert looks, Anne begins to wonder if she has been taking Gilbert for granted. At the end she is proven wrong, as Gilbert's lack of attention was caused by worry over one of his patients. He surprises Anne with an anniversary gift and a promise of a trip to Europe for a medical congress.

== Series ==
Montgomery continued the story of Anne Shirley in a series of sequels. They are listed in the order of Anne's age in each novel.

Lucy Maud Montgomery's books on Anne Shirley
#	Book	Date published	Anne Shirley's age
1	Anne of Green Gables	1908	11 — 16
2	Anne of Avonlea	1909	16 — 18
3	Anne of the Island	1915	18 — 22
4	Anne of Windy Poplars	1936	22 — 25
5	Anne's House of Dreams	1917	25 — 27
6	Anne of Ingleside	1939	34 — 40
7	Rainbow Valley	1919	41
8	Rilla of Ingleside	1921	49 — 53

Related books in which Anne Shirley plays a lesser part
#	Book	Date published	Anne Shirley's age
—	Chronicles of Avonlea	1912	—
—	Further Chronicles of Avonlea	1920	—
—	The Blythes Are Quoted	2009	—

== Editions ==
- ISBN 0-553-21315-6 (paperback, 1992)
- ISBN 0-14-036801-9 (paperback, 2005)
