= A Tangled Web (Montgomery novel) =

1931 novel by L. M. Montgomery

- First edition
- Author: L. M. Montgomery
- Language: English
- Publisher: McClelland and Stewart (Canada); Frederick A. Stokes (US)
- Publication date: 1931
- Publication place: Canada
- Media type: Print (Hardback & Paperback)
- Pages: 324 pp
- Text: A Tangled Web online

A Tangled Web is a novel by L. M. Montgomery. It was published in late 1931 by McClelland and Stewart (Canada), Frederick A. Stokes Company (USA), and Hodder and Stoughton (UK) under the title Aunt Becky Began It. It centres on a community consisting mainly of two families, the Penhallows and the Darks. Over three generations, sixty members of the Penhallow family have married sixty members of the Dark family, creating a tangled web of relationships and emotions.

The book was not as financially successful as Montgomery's earlier works, most notably the Canadian author's highly popular Anne of Green Gables series, as it was released after the Wall Street crash of 1929. Parts of the book were adapted from a short story that Montgomery had released earlier: "A House Divided Against Itself" which appeared in The Canadian Home Journal in March 1930. A story concerning members of the Penhallow family is also detailed in "The Winning of Lucinda" from Chronicles of Avonlea (1912), although this would appear to be a different branch of the family.

The United States copyright of A Tangled Web was renewed in 1958.

== Plot ==
Rebecca Dark (née Penhallow) learns she is dying. A widow with no surviving children, she has been considered the unofficial head of the clan (the extended Dark & Penhallow families) for some time and is known to all of them as Aunt Becky. She has held periodic afternoon gatherings of her clan, which she calls levees, at her home over the years. The clan have a love-hate relationship with her levees, because they fear her sharp tongue, but derive a perverse enjoyment of seeing other members writhing under her digs and slams. She decides to hold a final levee where the reader meets the rest of the characters and learns a bit about them. She reads her self-written obituary to them, to their horror, followed by her will, which disposes of her possessions. Many of them are coveted by at least one member present, but very few of the announced recipients of each item are appreciative. The last item mentioned is the old Dark jug, an antique and prized family heirloom, although not of any great monetary value or artistic merit. She reveals the recipient will not be named now, but in a year's time and produces a heavily sealed envelope which has either a named person or a description of a person who best exemplifies what she feels are worthy qualities.

In the year that follows, Aunt Becky has died and the family members try their best to live up to what Aunt Becky would have wanted in an attempt to win the heirloom, and in the process, many achieve self-discovery. There are several intertwining stories, but the most important ones involve the following characters:

Young Gay Penhallow's fiancé, the shallow Noel Gibson, dumps her for Nan Penhallow, a devious and deceptive girl. Although she still pines for Noel, Gay's friendship with Dr. Roger Penhallow, 14 years her senior, deepens as Gay is matured by her grief. When Noel attempts to return to Gay, she realizes that her infatuation with him pales next to her love for Roger.

Donna Dark and Peter Penhallow, who have despised each other since childhood, suddenly fall in love. They immediately make plans to get married, but their rival families soon discover their relationship. Although Donna and Peter resist attempts to break them up, they argue while they are eloping and part in anger. Peter leaves for South America. The couple remain estranged until Peter, who has returned at the end of a year, saves Donna from a fire. They then get married and leave for Africa.

Joscelyn and Hugh Dark separated on their wedding night, when Joscelyn confessed that she was in love with Hugh's best man, Frank Dark. They remain separated for ten years until Frank returns and Joscelyn realizes that he was not worth the passion she felt for him. She regrets her decision to leave Hugh and is sure that he must despise her. After a confrontation with Hugh's mother, Joscelyn realizes that Hugh still loves her and she returns to him.

Margaret Penhallow, the family dressmaker and an old maid, agrees to marry Penny Dark in order to improve both of their chances of getting the jug. Although she is not very fond of Penny, Margaret longs for a home of her own. Penny, similarly, has doubts about the match as he enjoys being a bachelor. He eventually decides to break the engagement, and is surprised and chagrined by Margaret's joy over her "jilting". Margaret then sells a first edition of The Pilgrim's Progress that she inherited from Aunt Becky and uses the money to buy a house for herself and to adopt Brian, an illegitimate and lonely orphan who is largely neglected by the family.

In the end, Dandy Dark, the person in charge of the jug, confesses that his pigs have eaten Aunt Becky's final instructions. As the family prepares to argue over the jug, the Moon Man, the eccentric Oswald Dark, destroys it.
