= Anne of Windy Poplars (film) =

1940 film by Jack Hively

- Directed by: Jack Hively
- Based on: Anne of Windy Poplars by L.M. Montgomery
- Produced by: Cliff Reid
- Starring: Anne Shirley; James Ellison; Patric Knowles; Slim Summerville
- Cinematography: Frank Redman
- Music by: Roy Webb
- Production company: RKO Radio Pictures
- Release date: June 28, 1940
- Running time: 82 minutes
- Country: United States
- Language: English

Anne of Windy Poplars is a 1940 film based on the novel of the same name by Lucy Maud Montgomery. A sequel to the 1934 film Anne of Green Gables, it features Anne Shirley (previously billed as Dawn O'Day) returning from the first film in the title role.

== Plot ==
Anne Shirley arrives in the town of Pringleton, where she will be vice-principal of the local school until her marriage to Gilbert Blythe. At the train station, Mrs. Stephen Pringle tells Anne that she cannot board with her as expected. Left to fend for herself, she gets a ride from the school janitor, Jabez Monkman. He takes her around town hoping to find boarding with one of the other Pringle families, but they all turn her down. She eventually finds a place to live at Windy Poplars, a lovely house owned by Kate, her brother Matey, and their housekeeper Rebecca. Anne learns that Hester Pringle, the bitter old widow of Pringleton's founder, is the one blackballing her in town. She also meets Betty Grayson, an orphaned girl who lives next door with her cruel aunt Ernestine Pringle, and who changes her name depending on how she feels.

Meanwhile at Maplehurst, the grim mansion where Hester Pringle lives, the determined matriarch gathers the Pringles to discuss how to remove Anne from her job. Tony Pringle wants nothing to do with it and leaves. Hester wants her adopted daughter Catherine to have Anne's position, despite Catherine's assertion that she would rather continue teaching. When she finds out Anne is living at Windy Poplars, Hester is furious.

The school principal, Mr. Gibson, tells Anne that she will teach an English class, direct the Dramatic Club, and instruct girls' gymnastics, in addition to vice-principal duties. She finds teaching difficult on account of Jen Pringle, who does what she pleases and is a bad influence on the other students. Jabez and Anne eavesdrop on Jen through the school's air vents and find out she is drawing a caricature of Anne on the blackboard. Anne shocks Jen by knowing who is responsible, which she credits to being psychic, and the class agree to behave themselves. Anne also tries to be friends with Catherine Pringle, but Catherine brushes her off and claims Anne hates all the Pringles.

Anne talks with Betty Grayson, who says she prays for "Tomorrow", when her parents will come and take her away, but her aunt tells her tomorrow never comes. Back at Windy Poplars, Matey shows Anne a log book from his days of sailing with Captain Isaac Pringle, the founder of Pringleton and Hester's late husband. Anne realizes the diary is why Hester fears the residents of Windy Poplars, as it shows that Isaac was a smuggler and pirate. She takes the diaries to Maplehurst, where Hester plays innocent about turning the town against her. Anne insists she could make the Pringles like her if they gave her a chance and storms off. She runs into Tony Pringle, who insists that she would get along with Catherine, but Anne does not know why Catherine dislikes her. Tony deduces that it is because she received the dramatic society, a job which Catherine loved. Anne requests Catherine's help with producing a play for Christmas, and Catherine suggests that they do Cinderella. Anne picks Jen to play the lead, and convinces Ernestine to let her take Betty to see the show. Gilbert returns and takes Kate, Matey, and Rebecca to the school while Anne goes to get Betty. She finds out that Betty is sick, but Ernestine believes it to be a tantrum and refuses to call a doctor. Anne puts Betty to bed and promises to visit in the morning and tell her all about the play.

Tony reveals to Catherine that Hester has Jen locked up at Maplehurst to ruin the play, so Catherine heads there to free her. Hester is being treated for a heart condition but she ignores the doctor's orders and throws her medication away while Catherine takes Jen's place in her bedroom. Meanwhile, Anne discovers that Ernestine has left Betty alone and rushes to her side. Jen arrives and the play goes on successfully. At the same time, Gilbert diagnoses Betty with pneumonia, so Anne tries to boost the girl's spirits by acting out the entire show just for her. The effort pays off and Betty's fever breaks.

Hester finds Catherine in Jen's place. Outraged, she locks Catherine in the room before suffering a heart attack and falling down the stairs. She drops a lantern which sets the house ablaze. Anne and the others hurry to Maplehurst, where Tony runs into the house and rescues Catherine. Hester was taken out of the house earlier, but later it is too late for her. With no way to put out the fire, the residents of Pringleton watch in silence as Maplehurst burns to the ground.

In the spring, a picnic brings the town together the day before Anne and Gilbert's wedding. Anne and Gilbert tell Betty that "Tomorrow" has come because they plan to adopt her. She is overjoyed that her parents have finally arrived and now she can be "Betty", her happy name, forever.

== Cast ==
- Anne Shirley as Anne Shirley
- James Ellison as Tony Pringle
- Henry Travers as Matey
- Patric Knowles as Gilbert Blythe
- Slim Summerville as Jabez Monkman
- Elizabeth Patterson as Rebecca
- Louise Campbell as Catherine Pringle
- Joan Carroll as Betty Grayson
- Katharine Alexander as Ernestine Pringle
- Minnie Dupree as Kate
- Alma Kruger as Mrs. Stephen Pringle
- Marcia Mae Jones as Jen Pringle
- Ethel Griffies as Hester Pringle
- Clara Blandick as Mrs. Morton Pringle
- Gilbert Emery as Stephen Pringle
- Wright Kramer as Morton Pringle
- Jackie Moran as Boy

== Reception ==
In a contemporary review in The New York Times, critic Theodore Strauss concluded: "It is, simply, the story of the little school marm, full of sweetness and light, who descends upon a small town dominated by as unpleasant a family tribe as Hollywood has ever gathered under one roof. How she ultimately wins them over is told in dialogue so laced with bromidic beatitudes and with so much nonsensical gush that one observer at least came away feeling as though he had eaten a box of marshmallows. Don't blame the actors, for Anne Shirley is pleasantly sincere and the others do their best. The fault lies with the script and the direction. As drama, Anne of Windy Poplars is just so much pink lemonade."

The film recorded a loss of $176,000.
