= Gilbert Blythe =

- Anne of Green Gables character
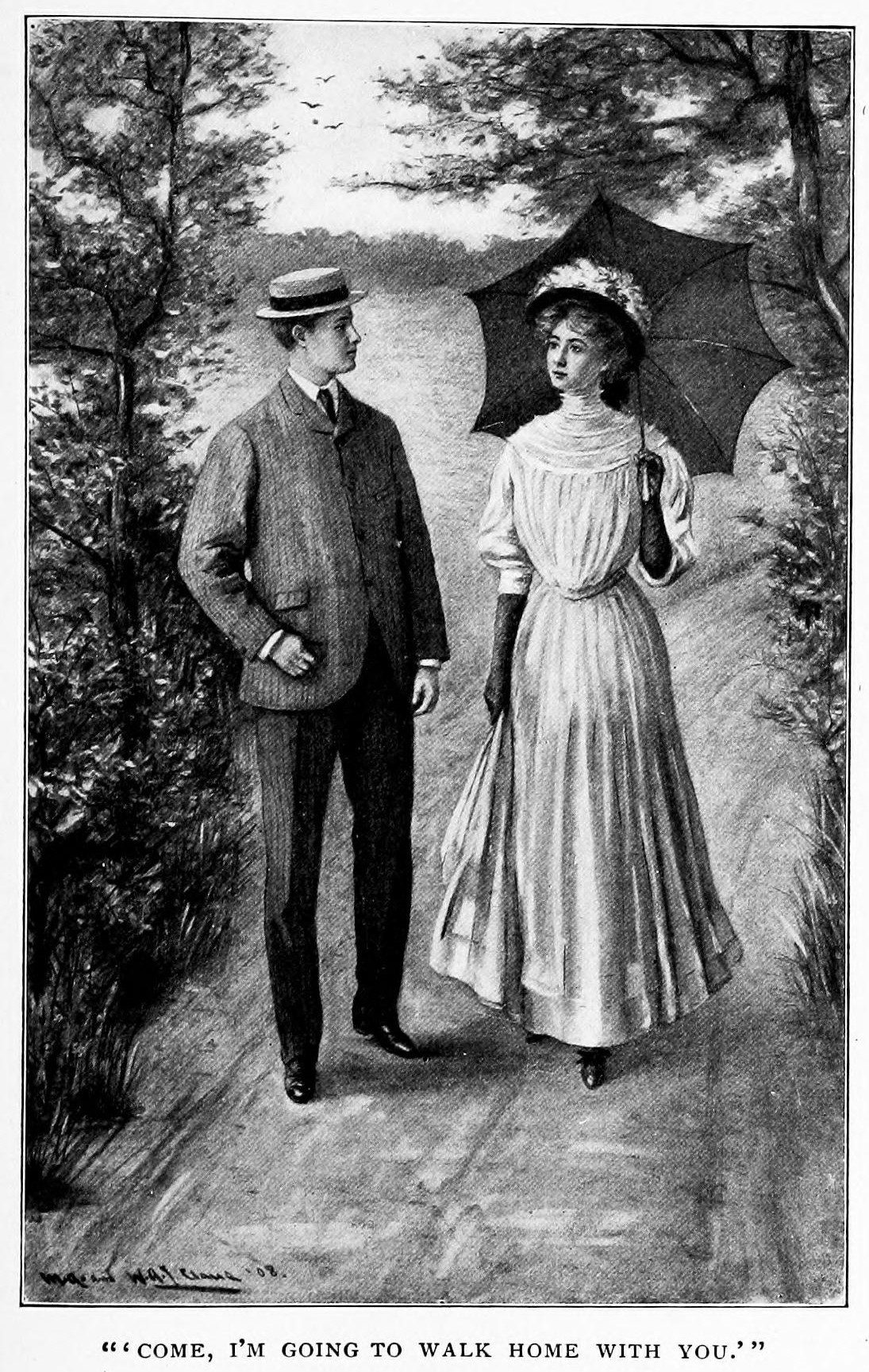
- Gilbert Blythe (left) as shown in a 1908 illustration
- First appearance: Anne of Green Gables
- Last appearance: Rilla of Ingleside
- Created by: L. M. Montgomery
- Portrayed by: Paul Kelly; Tom Brown; Patric Knowles; Robin Halstead; Christopher Blake; Jonathan Crombie; Drew Haytaoglu; Dylan Duff; Lucas Jade Zumann

In-universe information
- Full name: Gilbert Blythe
- Nickname: Gil
- Title: Doctor Blythe
- Occupation: Doctor; Teacher (formerly)
- Family: John Blythe (father); Mrs. Blythe (mother); Anne Shirley (wife); Joyce Blythe (daughter, deceased); James Matthew Blythe (son); Walter Cuthbert Blythe (son, deceased); Anne Blythe (daughter); Diana Blythe (daughter); Shirley Blythe (son); Bertha Marilla Blythe (daughter); Walter Shirley (father-in-law, deceased); Bertha Willis (mother-in-law, deceased)
- Religion: Presbyterian
- Nationality: Canadian

Gilbert Blythe is a character in Canadian author Lucy Maud Montgomery's Anne of Green Gables series of novels.

== Character description ==
Gilbert is described in the books as being very handsome with brown, curly hair and hazel eyes. He is tall with a lean build and used to wear an Aegean hat.

In his youth, he seems aware of his good looks and popularity with the girls; perhaps because of this, he sometimes tends to look them up and down, making them blush. The dismissal of his affections toward the eponymous Anne Shirley, however, seems to ground him, and he matures and is well-liked by many. Throughout the series, Gilbert is depicted as a fair, practical and reliable man, who is inclined to have a "common sense" view of things. Keenly intelligent, he has a strong wit and sense of humour.

As Gilbert matures, he becomes less headstrong and demonstrates a sense of patience and devotion. He eventually becomes a highly respected doctor in the fictional town of Glen St Mary, Prince Edward Island, where he lives with his wife Anne, their children and the family's spinster housekeeper, Susan. He is a practical and easy going guy and provides gravity to Anne's wandering mind.

== Series overview ==
Gilbert Blythe takes an immediate interest in Anne upon their first meeting and tries to gain her attention; however, when Anne ignores him, he teasingly calls her "Carrots" because of her red hair, unaware of her sensitivity about it. In response, Anne smashes her slate over his head in anger, and despite his attempts to apologize, she refuses to forgive him for several years. Throughout the entire first book, Gilbert repeatedly shows admiration for Anne, but she coldly rebuffs him. She continues her grudge even after he rescues her from the pond after a near-disastrous reenactment of Tennyson's "Lancelot and Elaine." When Anne refuses his offer of friendship after the incident, Gilbert decides to respond in kind and stops openly trying to gain her attention. They develop a strong academic rivalry instead (though the competition is entirely good-natured on Gilbert's side), and Anne gradually acknowledges Gilbert as an intellectual equal; they eventually compete to win scholarships at Queens Academy.

Following his time at Queens, Gilbert decides to teach at the Avonlea school to finance his future college education. When one of Anne's guardians, Matthew, dies of a heart attack, Anne chooses to give up the Avery Scholarship to stay at Green Gables and support Marilla. After learning of Anne's predicament, Gilbert, who has always loved Anne, gives up his position so Anne can teach in Avonlea and live at Green Gables with Marilla. Gilbert teaches at the White Sands School and Anne, after learning of his noble act, finally forgives him.

During the two years Anne teaches in Avonlea, Gilbert and Anne become very close. At the end of their teaching "chapter in life," Anne starts to have stronger feelings towards him but does not recognize them as love. Gilbert aspires to become a doctor and goes on to study at Redmond College, where he is joined by Anne, freed of personal obligations after the widowed Rachel Lynde moves to Green Gables to keep Marilla company, in Anne of the Island.

Gilbert's feelings for Anne become increasingly apparent during their first year of college, while Anne becomes uncomfortable around him because she believes her feelings for Gilbert are entirely platonic as he does not match her idealized notion of true love, which requires a dark, proud, melancholy and over-romanticized hero. However, Anne's jealousy of Gilbert's other potential love interests, her moments of physical attraction to him, and her deep respect and devotion to their friendship suggest that she may be falling in love with him without realizing it.

In their second year of college, Gilbert proposes but Anne refuses him, saying she doesn't care for him "in that way" and that she only wants to be his friend. Disappointed, Gilbert states that "your friendship can't satisfy me, Anne. I want your love -- and you tell me I can never have that". Their relationship becomes awkward, especially after Anne meets and is courted by fellow Redmond student Roy Gardner, a man who at first seems to personify her "ideal," although Anne secretly admits to herself that Roy lacks certain qualities and that she and Roy do not share a sense of humor. Gilbert seems to concede defeat and Anne believes that he has become involved with another student, Christine Stuart, who is later revealed to be only a friend. Instead, he focuses his attention on obtaining the Cooper Prize, a prestigious scholarship that will allow him to attend medical school.

Not long after graduation, Gilbert contracts typhoid fever as a result of physically exhausting himself during school. Anne, who has recently refused a proposal of marriage from Roy Gardner after realizing that she does not love him, is shocked to learn that Gilbert may die. She realizes that she loves and has always loved him; that "she belonged to him and he to her," and recognizes at last that she mistook her "bond" to Gilbert for strong friendship instead of love, while her relationship with Roy was merely "flattered fancy." Gilbert also admits that he never loved Christine Stuart; she was already engaged and he had been asked to look after her while she was at college.

Gilbert recovers from his illness and resumes his friendship with Anne after learning she refused Roy Gardner. He proposes to her again and she accepts. However, they remain engaged for three years, as Gilbert intends to finish his medical course before marrying her; they correspond regularly in their time apart (Anne of Windy Poplars), while Anne works as a principal at Summerside High School.

The two marry in Anne's House of Dreams and move to the town of Glen St. Mary, where Gilbert takes over his uncle's medical practice. He proves to be an excellent and well-respected doctor. Their married life is very happy and they have seven children: Joyce (also called Joy; died as an infant), James Matthew (Jem), Walter Cuthbert (who dies during the First World War), Anne and Diana (twins; also called Nan and Di), Shirley (the youngest boy), and Bertha Marilla (called Rilla).

Within Montgomery's lifetime, the series ends in 1919 and Anne and Gilbert are happy; Gilbert is 55 and still sincerely in love with Anne of Green Gables. Montgomery subsequently submitted the short story collection The Blythes Are Quoted to her publisher very shortly before her death in 1942, although it was not published until the 21st century. In this collection, in which the Blythe family appears often as secondary characters, the series is extended into the very early 1940s. Still living in Glen St. Mary, Gilbert and Anne are the grandparents of at least five children, several of whom are off to fight in World War II.

== Screen portrayals ==
In the 1919 film adaptation, Gilbert was portrayed by Paul Kelly. In the 1934 film adaptation, Gilbert was portrayed by Tom Brown. In the 1940 sequel Anne of Windy Poplars, Gilbert was portrayed by Patric Knowles. In the 1972 BBC TV adaptation, the young Gilbert was played by Robin Halstead, and in the follow-up series, Anne of Avonlea, the adult Gilbert was played by Christopher Blake.

Gilbert was portrayed by Jonathan Crombie in the CBC Television film adaptations of 1985, 1987, and 2000. In the Japanese anime adaptation of Anne of Green Gables, he is voiced by Kazuhiko Inoue. The CD recording of the musical that has run for more than 40 years at the Charlottetown Festival, focusing on Anne and Gilbert's relationship, features Andrew MacBean as Gilbert. Gilbert was portrayed by Drew Haytaoglu in the 2016 film L.M. Montgomery's Anne of Green Gables. Gilbert is portrayed by Lucas Jade Zumann in the 2017 CBC and Netflix series Anne with an E. Gilbert was also portrayed by Dylan Duff in the 2019 play/film Anne of Green Gables.
