= Anne of Green Gables: The Sequel =

1987 film

- DVD cover
- Genre: Drama; Family
- Based on: Anne of Avonlea; Anne of the Island; Anne of Windy Poplars by Lucy Maud Montgomery
- Written by: Kevin Sullivan
- Directed by: Kevin Sullivan
- Starring: Megan Follows; Colleen Dewhurst; Wendy Hiller; Frank Converse; Jonathan Crombie; Marilyn Lightstone; Schuyler Grant; Rosemary Dunsmore; Kate Lynch; Geneviève Appleton; James O'Regan
- Music by: Hagood Hardy
- Country of origin: Canada
- Original language: English
- No. of episodes: 4

Production
- Producers: Kevin Sullivan; Trudy Grant
- Cinematography: Marc Champion
- Editors: James Lahti; Mairin Wilkinson
- Running time: 57 minutes (approx.) per episode 228 minutes total
- Production company: Kevin Sullivan Entertainment
- Budget: US$4.8 million

Original release
- Network: Disney Channel
- Release: 19 May – 9 June 1987

Related
- Anne of Green Gables (1985); Road to Avonlea (1990–1996)

Anne of Green Gables: The Sequel (also known as Anne of Avonlea) is a 1987 Canadian television miniseries film. A sequel to the 1985 miniseries Anne of Green Gables, it is based on Lucy Maud Montgomery's novels Anne of Avonlea, Anne of the Island, and Anne of Windy Poplars. The story follows Anne Shirley as she leaves Green Gables in Avonlea, Prince Edward Island, to teach at a prestigious ladies' college in New Brunswick. The main cast from the original film reprised their roles, including Megan Follows, Jonathan Crombie, Colleen Dewhurst, Patricia Hamilton, and Schuyler Grant.

The miniseries aired on the Disney Channel as Anne of Avonlea: The Continuing Story of Anne of Green Gables and on CBC as Anne of Green Gables: The Sequel; it was released theatrically in Israel, Japan, and Europe. In 2017, the miniseries was officially retitled Anne of Avonlea for all subsequent Blu-Ray releases and online streaming.

The film was followed by two sequels, Anne of Green Gables: The Continuing Story in 2000 and Anne of Green Gables: A New Beginning in 2008.

== Plot ==
After two years of teaching at the Avonlea school, Anne Shirley dreams of being a writer, but her story "Averil's Atonement" is rejected by a magazine. Her best friend Diana Barry has become engaged. Marilla's eyesight has also improved, opening an opportunity for Anne to follow her ambitions, which have been on hold since giving up the Avery Scholarship.

Anne's misadventures in Avonlea continue. Unbeknownst to her, Diana submitted "Averil's Atonement" into a contest to introduce the new Rollings Reliable baking powder to the public, and it wins first prize. Anne is grateful to her friend for trying to boost her spirits, but finds the widespread recognition humiliating. She later sees her jersey cow Dolly in Rachel Lynde's field, which she had promised would never happen again. After unsuccessfully trying to get Dolly back to her field, Anne sells the cow to Gilbert Blythe and his father. She laments about her "Jonah day" to Marilla, who offers encouragement and plum puffs, only to discover she had actually sold Rachel's cow instead of her own. When she and Marilla pay a visit to the Lyndes to explain her mistake, Rachel's ailing husband Thomas passes away, which Rachel fears will force her to sell her farm and leave Avonlea.

At a clambake for Diana's engagement, Gilbert proposes to Anne, but she rejects his offer, convinced that their marriage would be unhappy and unsuccessful. At Diana's wedding, she sees Gilbert with a young woman named Christine Stuart. Gilbert insists they are just friends, and offers to wait for Anne, but she affirms she will never marry. Back at Green Gables, Marilla reveals that Rachel will be moving in with her. Anne decides to accept a job offer from her former teacher Miss Stacey as an English literature teacher at Kingsport Ladies' College in New Brunswick.

Anne initially finds her job difficult. Kingsport is dominated by the wealthy Pringle family, who resent that she received the position over one of their own. The students in her class, led by Jen Pringle, delight in causing trouble to make Anne look like a bad teacher. Anne must also endure the cold and sarcastic principal of Kingsport Ladies' College, Katherine Brooke. She grows close to Emmeline Harris, a bright student whose widowed father, Morgan Harris, Anne had encountered previously. After Anne and Emmeline cause a disturbance, angering Katherine, Morgan withdraws both his daughter and his financial support from K.L.C. and confines Emmeline with her stern grandmother Margaret Harris and repressed aunt Pauline at their mansion, Maplehurst. Anne convinces Mrs. Harris to let her tutor Emmeline at home, and let Pauline attend a friend's wedding anniversary overnight. Meanwhile, Anne and Miss Stacey organize a play to raise money for the school, with Jen Pringle playing the lead role of Mary, Queen of Scots. When Jen calls off sick on the day of the show, Anne convinces Morgan to let Emmeline star in the play, which they have been rehearsing during tutoring sessions. The show is a success and Anne finally wins the Pringles' support. After returning from a trip to Boston with the Harris family, she runs into Gilbert and finds out that he is engaged to Christine Stuart. Encouraged by Gilbert to try writing about her home town, she publishes a series of short stories entitled Avonlea Vignettes. During a hospital benefit ball, Morgan asks her to marry him, which she declines.

After Mrs. Harris dies, Pauline accepts a marriage proposal and Morgan decides to sell Maplehurst and return to Boston with Emmeline. Anne resigns from K.L.C. and persuades Katherine to come back to Avonlea with her for the summer holidays. Upon arriving at Green Gables and meeting Diana's new baby, Anne discovers that Gilbert has fallen ill with scarlet fever, which he contracted at medical school in Halifax. Finally realizing her true feelings for Gilbert, Anne rushes to his bedside, where he tells her that he has called off his engagement to Christine because Anne is the only one for him. After recovering, he proposes once more, and Anne accepts him with a kiss.

== Timeline of events (1902–1903) ==
- Late spring 1902 – Anne, now 18, finishes teaching at Avonlea school after 2 years.
- Summer 1902 – Diana marries Fred, Anne takes a teaching position at Kingsport Ladies College.
- September 1902 – Anne begins teaching at Kingsport Ladies College.
- November 26, 1902 – Production date of Anne's play at Kingsport Ladies College.
- Summer 1903 – Katherine Brooke spends summer break with Anne at Green Gables. Anne commits to Gilbert.

== Cast ==
- Megan Follows - Anne Shirley
- Colleen Dewhurst - Marilla Cuthbert
- Jonathan Crombie - Gilbert Blythe
- Richard Farnsworth - Matthew Cuthbert
- Schuyler Grant - Diana Barry
- Patricia Hamilton - Rachel Lynde
- Marilyn Lightstone - Miss Stacey
- Wendy Hiller - Mrs. Margaret Harris
- Frank Converse - Morgan Harris
- Kate Lynch - Pauline Harris
- Genevieve Appleton - Emmeline Harris
- Rosemary Dunsmore - Katherine Brooke
- Susannah Hoffman - Jen Pringle
- Nuala Fitzgerald - Mrs. Tom Pringle
- Molly MacNeil - Myra Pringle
- Fiona McGillivray - Hattie Pringle
- London Juno - Jimsie Pringle
- Bruce McCulloch - Fred Wright
- Sheila Harcourt - Christine Stuart
- Kathryn Trainor - Essie
- Rosemary Radcliffe - Mrs. Barry
- Charmion King - Aunt Josephine Barry
- Robert Collins - Mr. Barry
- Kay Hawtrey - Mabel Sloane
- Jacqueline Blais - Mrs. Harrison
- Anna Ferguson - Mrs. Boulter
- Trish Nettleton - Jane Andrews
- Jennifer Inch - Ruby Gillis
- Brigit Wilson - Tillie Boulter
- Miranda de Pencier - Josie Pye (uncredited)
- Ian Heath - Anthony Pye
- Mag Ruffman - Alice Lawson
- Dave Foley - Lewis Allen

== Production ==
When Kevin Sullivan was commissioned by CBC, PBS and The Disney Channel to create a sequel he started by combining many different elements of Montgomery's first three sequel books: Anne of Avonlea (1909), Anne of the Island (1915), and Anne of Windy Poplars (1936) into a cohesive screen story. Sullivan invented his own plot line relying on several of Montgomery's episodic storylines spread across the three sequels, he also looked at numerous other nineteenth century female authors for inspiration in fleshing out the screen story.

The film succeeded in re-popularizing Megan Follows and Colleen Dewhurst in their original roles. Sullivan also cast British veteran actress and Oscar winner, Wendy Hiller, in the role of the impossible Mrs. Harris whom Sullivan created based on a composite of several matriarchs found in the series of novels.

In Canada, the film became the highest rated drama to air on network television in Canadian broadcasting history. This Sequel became known as Anne of Green Gables - The Sequel when shown around the world, and as Anne of Avonlea - the Continuing Story of Anne of Green Gables when it premiered on The Disney Channel.

== Broadcast and Homevideo ==
The Disney Channel was the first television station to broadcast the miniseries in four hour-long installments, giving the world premiere of the series in May and June 1987, using the title Anne of Avonlea: The Continuing Story of Anne of Green Gables. This was the same title used in March 1988 when the series was broadcast on the PBS anthology series WonderWorks. Disney later shortened the title in television syndication and for VHS and DVD sales to simply Anne of Avonlea. The airing rights and video rights to the program in the United States were initially purchased by PBS under the title Anne of Avonlea, and the rights to broadcast the series and sell the series for home video under that title were purchased by the Walt Disney Company from PBS in 1987.

The series debuted in Canada using the title Anne of Green Gables: The Sequel in two 150-minute installments, in December 1987, on CBC (Canadian Broadcasting Corporation). The miniseries has used various names in international markets, depending on the distribution rights in that given market with Disney using the title Anne of Avonlea and Sullivan Films of Toronto using the title Anne of Green Gables: The Sequel in European and Asian markets.

== Awards and nominations ==
Megan Follows was nominated for an ACE Award in 1988 by the National Academy of Cable Programing in the Ninth Annual System Awards for Cable Excellence for Disney's "Anne of Avonlea".

- 2 Cable Ace Awards: Best Costume, Best Supporting Actress (Colleen Dewhurst), 1987
- 6 Gemini Awards: Best Dramatic Miniseries, Best Photography (Marc Champion), Best Art Direction, Best Costume Design, Best Performance by Lead Actress (Megan Follows), Best Performance by a Supporting Actress (Colleen Dewhurst), 1988
- Silver Award - International Film and Television Festival, New York, 1987
- Best Family Series - TV Guide, 1987
- CFTA Award - Best New TV Production, 1987
- Chris Award - Columbus International Film Festival, 1987
- Honourable Mention - International San Francisco Film Festival, 1988
- Crystal Apple Award - National Education Film and Video Festival, 1988
- ACT Award - Achievement in Children's TV, 1988
- Golden Hugo Award - Chicago International Film Festival, 1987
- Gold Award - Houston International Film Festival, 1987

== Sequels and spinoffs ==
Road to Avonlea is a television series which was first broadcast in Canada and the United States between 1990 and 1996. It was inspired by a series of short stories and two novels by Lucy Maud Montgomery. Many of the actors in the Anne of Green Gables movies also appear in storylines crossing over into the long-running Emmy award-winning series, including Patricia Hamilton as Rachel Lynde, Colleen Dewhurst as Marilla Cuthbert until her death in 1991, and Marilyn Lightstone as Muriel Stacy. Jonathan Crombie returned as Gilbert Blythe in a one-time guest appearance in the finale episode of season three, which dealt with Marilla's death. Other actors from the first two Anne films portrayed different characters in Road to Avonlea, including Rosemary Dunsmore, who played Katherine Brooke in this film but returned as "Abigail MacEwan" in the television series.

Anne of Green Gables: The Continuing Story was released in 2000. Many cast members from the first two movies returned, including Megan Follows, Jonathan Crombie, and Schuyler Grant. Taking place in the midst of World War I, the movie follows Anne (now in her twenties) as she embarks on a new journey, taking her from her home in Prince Edward Island to New York City, London, and into war-ravaged Europe. This film is an original story not based on any of Montgomery's novels, nor does it align with the chronology of the books. Montgomery's Rilla of Ingleside, which also takes place during the first World War, focuses on Anne's teenage daughter and depicts Anne and Gilbert as a middle-aged couple who witness the effects of the war from the home front while their adult sons fight in Europe.

Anne of Green Gables: A New Beginning was released in fall 2008 (the 100th anniversary of the original novel) as both a sequel and prequel to the previous films. Set near the end of World War II in 1945, the story follows a middle-aged Anne (Barbara Hershey) looking back on her life before Green Gables. Hannah Endicott-Douglas played the role of young Anne.
