= Chronicles of Avonlea =

Short-story collection by L. M. Montgomery

- First US edition
- Author: Lucy Maud Montgomery
- Language: English
- Series: Anne of Green Gables
- Genre: Short stories
- Publisher: McClelland & Stewart (Canada); L.C. Page (US)
- Publication date: 1912
- Publication place: Canada
- Media type: Print (hardback & paperback)
- Pages: 236 pp
- Followed by: Further Chronicles of Avonlea
- Text: Chronicles of Avonlea at Wikisource

Chronicles of Avonlea is a collection of short stories by Canadian author L. M. Montgomery, related to the Anne of Green Gables series. It features an abundance of stories relating to the fictional Canadian village of Avonlea and was first published in 1912. Sometimes marketed as a book in the Anne Shirley series, Anne plays only a minor role in the book: Out of the 12 stories in the collection, she stars in only one ("The Hurrying of Ludovic") and has a small supporting role in another ("The Courting of Prissy Strong"). She is otherwise only briefly mentioned in passing in five other stories: "Each in His Own Tongue", "Little Joscelyn", "The Winning of Lucinda", "Quarantine at Alexander Abraham's", and "The End of a Quarrel".

Other Avonlea residents from the Anne series are also referenced in passing, including Marilla Cuthbert and Mrs. Rachel Lynde. As well, there are brief appearances made by Diana Barry, the Reverend Mr. Allan, and his wife. Alice Penhallow from "The Winning of Lucinda" would be mentioned later in Anne of the Island; in fact, the wedding of Alice Penhallow that Anne mentions she will be attending in chapter XLI of Anne of the Island is the setting for the story "The Winning of Lucinda". The Penhallow family are also the central characters of Montgomery's later novel A Tangled Web, though these Penhallows would appear to be a different branch of the family.

The majority of stories, though, are about residents of Avonlea (and surrounding towns) who are never mentioned in the Anne novels. One reason for this is that most of the short stories in this volume were written and published by Montgomery in various magazines before Anne of Green Gables was even conceived. With the great success of Anne of Green Gables in 1908 and the sequel Anne of Avonlea in 1909, Montgomery was under pressure from her publisher to deliver more stories about Anne. Accordingly, she reworked the settings of several previously published non-Avonlea stories to incorporate references to Avonlea, as well as inserting several references to Anne Shirley and some of the town's other characters. The whole was then marketed as a new companion book to the Anne series.

The book is dedicated "To the memory of MRS WILLIAM A. HOUSTON, a dear friend who has gone beyond."

== Stories ==
1. "The Hurrying of Ludovic": Anne Shirley is behind Ludovic Speed's proposal to Theodora Dix after their very long courtship.
2. "Old Lady Lloyd": Old Lady Lloyd, thought to be very rich, encounters the daughter of her former beau and tries to help her.
3. "Each in His Own Tongue": Reverend Stephen Leonard attempts to stifle his grandson Felix's gifted violin-playing, which he sees as unholy.
4. "Little Joscelyn": Aunty Nan hears of Joscelyn Burnett's return to Prince Edward Island and greatly desires to hear her old friend sing.
5. "The Winning of Lucinda": Lucinda and Romney Penhallow's longtime feud is resolved.
6. "Old Man Shaw's Girl": Mrs Peter Blewett attempts to destroy Old Man Shaw's hopes regarding the return of his beloved daughter Sara ("Blossom").
7. "Aunt Olivia's Beau": Olivia Sterling is courted by Malcolm McPherson.
8. "Quarantine at Alexander Abraham's": Severe man-hater Angelina "Peter" MacPherson is quarantined for smallpox with Alexander Abraham Bennett, a misogynist who has not allowed a woman in his house for years.
9. "Pa Sloane's Purchase": Pa Sloane rashly buys a baby at an auction and must deal with the consequences.
10. "The Courting of Prissy Strong": Stephen Clark courts Prissy Strong despite her sister Emmeline's strong opposition.
11. "The Miracle at Carmody": Avowed atheist Judith Marsh and her sister Salome attempt to raise young Lionel Hezekiah.
12. "The End of a Quarrel": Peter Wright and Nancy Rogerson meet again, many years after a quarrel over his grammar broke them up.

== Sequels and adaptations ==
Chronicles of Avonlea was followed, in 1920, by Further Chronicles of Avonlea, which also dealt with numerous families from the fictional Avonlea district and included one story with Anne Shirley. It was compiled without Montgomery's permission, from stories passed over for this first book, resulting in a legal battle. Some of its stories were used as a base for the successful television series Road to Avonlea.

== Series ==
Montgomery continued the story of Anne Shirley in a series of sequels. They are listed in the order of Anne's age in each novel.

Lucy Maud Montgomery's books on Anne Shirley
#	Book	Date published	Anne Shirley's age
1	Anne of Green Gables	1908	11 – 16
2	Anne of Avonlea	1909	16 – 18
3	Anne of the Island	1915	18 – 22
4	Anne of Windy Poplars/Anne of Windy Willows	1936	22 – 25
5	Anne's House of Dreams	1917	25 – 27
6	Anne of Ingleside	1939	34 – 40
7	Rainbow Valley	1919	41
8	Rilla of Ingleside	1921	49 – 53

Related books in which Anne Shirley plays a lesser part
#	Book	Date published	Anne Shirley's age
—	Chronicles of Avonlea	1912	—
—	Further Chronicles of Avonlea	1920	—
—	The Blythes Are Quoted	2009	—
