= Pocket Magazine =

American literary magazine

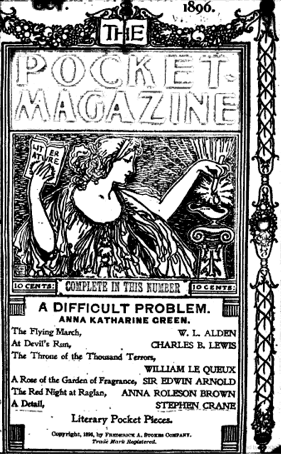
The Pocket Magazine, 1896

The Pocket Magazine (1895–1901) was an American literary magazine published by the Frederick A. Stokes Company in New York. It was edited by Irving Bacheller from its inception until June 1898, and by Abbot Frederic (a pseudonym for the publisher, Frederick A(bbot) Stokes) from August 1898 to the end of the run. At the end of 1901, the magazine was merged into Frank Leslie's Popular Monthly. The magazine printed work by Stephen Crane, Arthur Conan Doyle, Beatrice Harraden, Max Pemberton, Edmund C. Stedman and others.
