= Further Chronicles of Avonlea =

1920 short story collection by Lucy Maud Montgomery

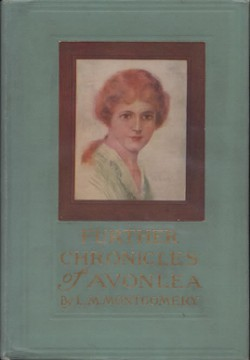
- First edition
- Author: Lucy Maud Montgomery
- Language: English
- Series: Anne of Green Gables
- Genre: Short stories
- Publisher: McClelland & Stewart
- Publication date: 1920
- Publication place: Canada
- Media type: Print (hardback & paperback)
- Pages: 220 pp
- Preceded by: Chronicles of Avonlea
- Followed by: The Blythes Are Quoted
- Text: Further Chronicles of Avonlea at Wikisource

Further Chronicles of Avonlea is a collection of short stories by Canadian author L. M. Montgomery and is a sequel to Chronicles of Avonlea. Published in 1920, it includes a number of stories relating to the inhabitants of the fictional Canadian village of Avonlea and its region, located on Prince Edward Island. Sometimes marketed as a book in the Anne Shirley series, Anne plays only a minor role in the book: out of the 15 stories in the collection, she narrates and stars in only one ("The Little Brown Book of Miss Emily"), and is briefly mentioned in passing in two others ("Aunt Cynthia's Persian Cat" and "The Return of Hester"). Three other characters from the Anne books are seen in brief secondary roles: Diana Barry and Marilla Cuthbert in "The Little Brown Book of Miss Emily", and Rachel Lynde in "Sara's Way". As well, Matthew Cuthbert is mentioned in passing in "The Conscience Case of David Bell".

== Stories ==
1. "Aunt Cynthia's Persian Cat": Aunt Cynthia leaves her beloved Persian cat Fatima in the care of her unwilling nieces Sue and Ismay Meade. When Fatima disappears, Sue must call on desperate measures to avoid wealthy Aunt Cynthia's wrath.
2. "The Materializing of Cecil": Unwilling to admit that she has never had a suitor, Miss Charlotte Holmes invents the dashing Cecil Fenwick of Blakely, New Brunswick to keep the Avonlea gossips at bay. When the real Cecil appears, Miss Charlotte fears the truth will emerge.
3. "Her Father's Daughter": Rachel Spencer invites her estranged father to her wedding, to the fury of her mother Isabella.
4. "Jane's Baby": When Jane Roberts dies, her cousins Miss Rosetta Ellis and Mrs. Charlotte Wheeler feud over her child.
5. "The Dream-Child": A mysterious wailing calls grieving mother Josie to the seaside; she believes it is the cry of the ghost of her and David's first baby.
6. "The Brother Who Failed": During the Monroes' reunion at the family home in Avonlea, Aunt Isabel tactlessly remarks that Robert is "the only failure," and his siblings initiate a scheme to restore his self-esteem.
7. "The Return of Hester": Dying Hester Meredith forces her sister Margaret to promise she won't marry Hugh Blair, but when Margaret and Hugh fall desperately in love, Hester herself intervenes to facilitate their union.
8. "The Little Brown Book of Miss Emily": Anne Shirley and her friend Diana Barry become acquainted with irritating old maid Miss Emily Leith while they are staying at Echo Lodge in Grafton; upon Miss Emily's death, Anne receives a mysterious parcel. Narrated by Anne Shirley.
9. "Sara's Way": Mrs. Eben Andrews discusses her daughter Sara and Sara's suitor Lige Baxter with Mrs. Jonas Andrews. When Lige's brother's business is ruined, everyone involved has a different view of the situation.
10. "The Son of his Mother": Thyra Carewe learns that her beloved son Chester has bestowed his affections on the beautiful Damaris Garland.
11. "The Education of Betty": Newly widowed Sara Churchill arranges for a former beau to tutor her untamed daughter Betty.
12. "In Her Selfless Mood": Eunice Carr devotes her life to granting her mother Naomi Holland's deathbed request that she look after Christopher Holland, Naomi's son and Eunice's half-brother.
13. "The Conscience Case of David Bell": David Bell refuses to testify in the name of Jesus Christ, to the horror of Avonlea society.
14. "Only a Common Fellow": Story of the Mark Foster/Phillippa Clark/Owen Blair love triangle.
15. "Tannis of the Flats": Jerome Carey, telegraph officer in "The Flats," a trading station in the Canadian Northwest, becomes the object of beautiful "half-breed" Tannis Dumont's affections, but he falls in love with Elinor Blair of Avonlea.

== Controversy ==
The book was published without the permission of L.M. Montgomery, and was formed from stories she had decided not to publish in the earlier Chronicles of Avonlea. Montgomery sued her publishers, L.C. Page & Co, and won $18,000 in damages after a legal battle lasting nearly nine years. Nevertheless it has been officially republished alongside her other works on many occasions, although neither it, nor the authorized Chronicles collection, are considered part of the Anne series proper.

== Series ==
Montgomery continued the story of Anne Shirley in a series of sequels. They are listed in the order of Anne's age in each novel.

Lucy Maud Montgomery's books on Anne Shirley
#	Book	Date published	Anne Shirley's age
1	Anne of Green Gables	1908	11 — 16
2	Anne of Avonlea	1909	16 — 18
3	Anne of the Island	1915	18 — 22
4	Anne of Windy Poplars	1936	22 — 25
5	Anne's House of Dreams	1917	25 — 27
6	Anne of Ingleside	1939	34 — 40
7	Rainbow Valley	1919	41
8	Rilla of Ingleside	1921	49 — 53

Related books in which Anne Shirley plays a lesser part
#	Book	Date published	Anne Shirley's age
—	Chronicles of Avonlea	1912	—
—	Further Chronicles of Avonlea	1920	—
—	The Blythes Are Quoted	2009	—
