= Maria Louise Kirk =

American illustrator

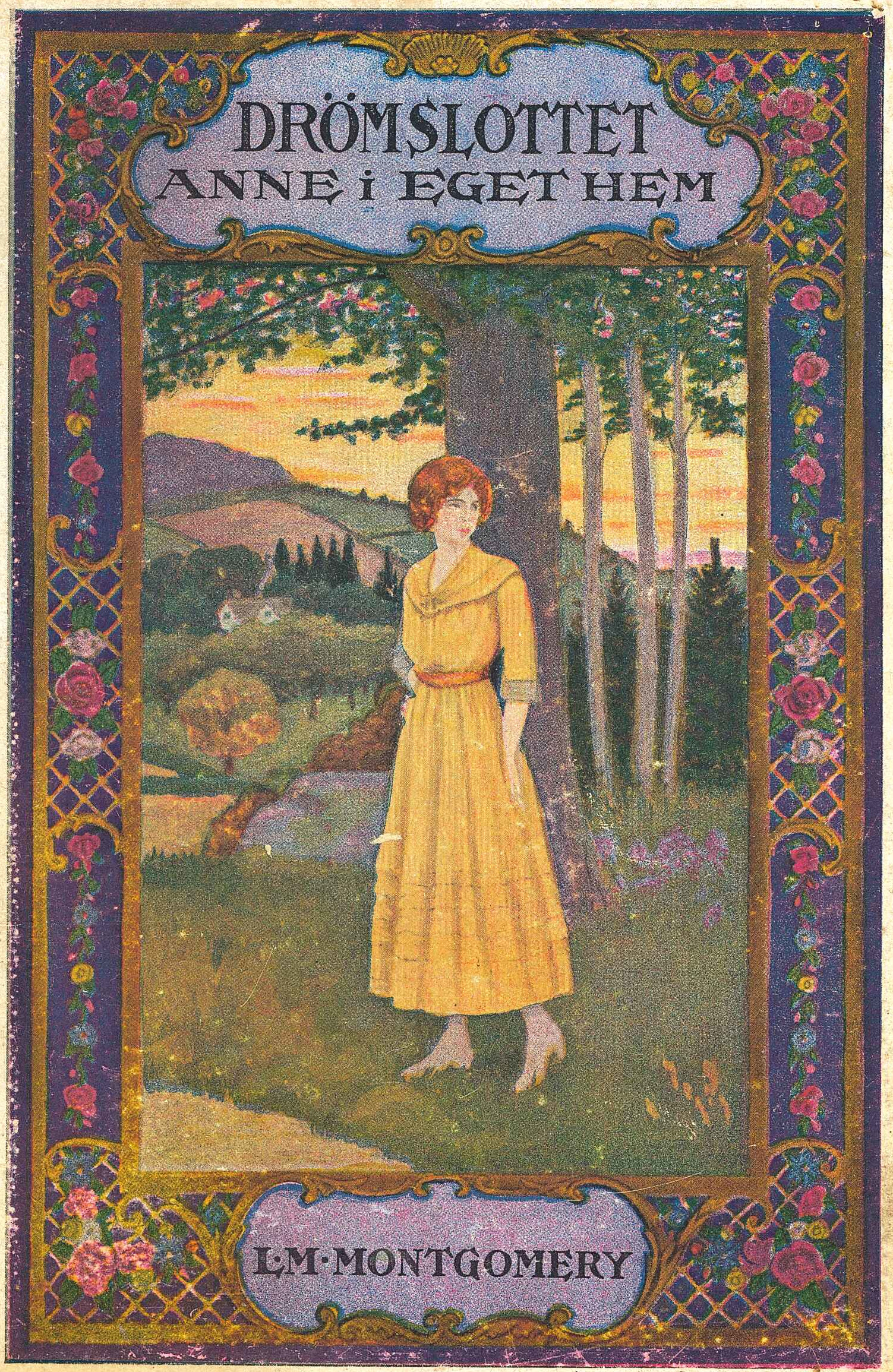
Cover of Swedish edition of Anne's House of Dreams

Maria Louise Kirk (21 June 1860 – 21 June 1938), usually credited as M. L. Kirk or Maria L. Kirk, was an American painter and illustrator of more than fifty books, most of them for children.

Her notable work includes illustrations for a US edition of Alice's Adventures in Wonderland in 1904, for the first edition of The Secret Garden, and for several books by L. M. Montgomery and Johanna Spyri.

== Life and work ==
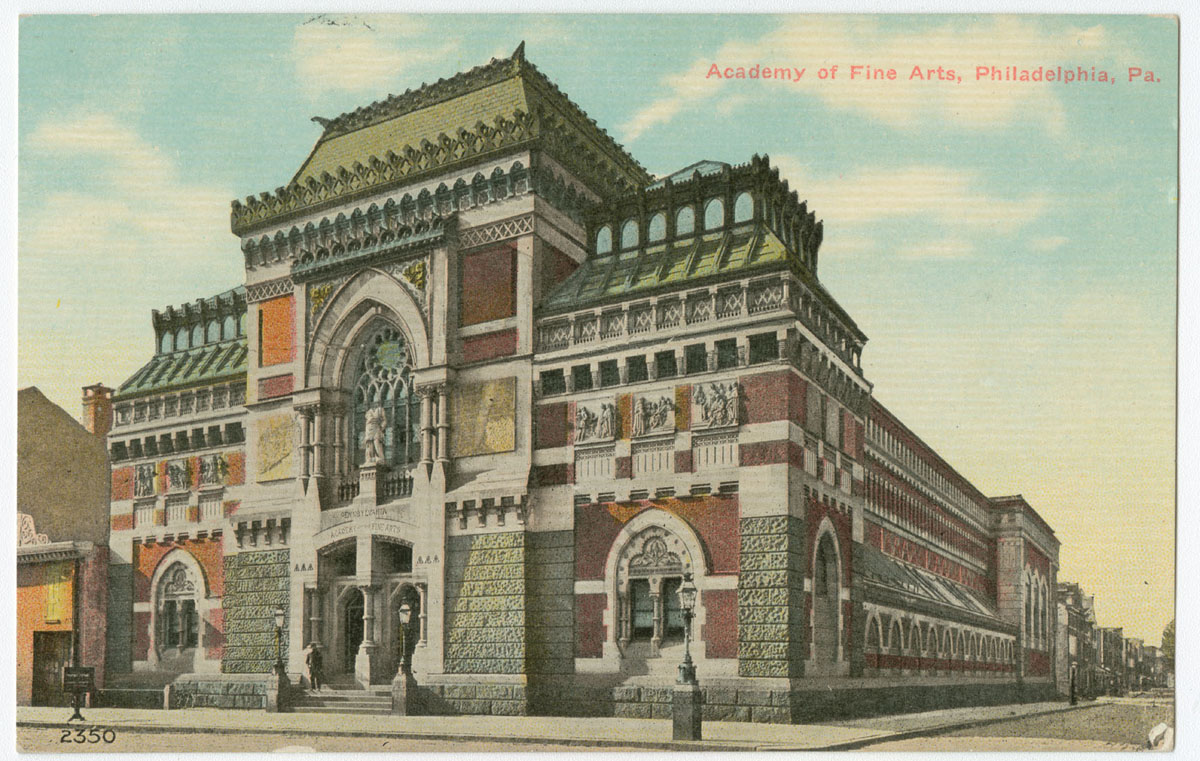
The Academy of Fine Arts

Born in Lancaster, Pennsylvania, Kirk studied art in Philadelphia at the School of Design for Women and then at the Pennsylvania Academy of the Fine Arts, She had exhibitions around Pennsylvania and won awards in Philadelphia and Chicago.

In the 1890s, she went on to study at the Art Institute of Chicago and in 1894 won the Mary Smith Prize of the Pennsylvania Academy of the Fine Arts, for a portrait.

During her career, Kirk illustrated more than fifty books, including an American edition of Alice's Adventures in Wonderland in 1904. Her style is individual, little influenced by the Jugendstil or Art Deco movements.

Although she was a talented artist, with so much published work, little is known about Kirk's life. She died on her 78th birthday in 1938.

In 2009, the Folio Society of London used Kirk's illustrations for its new edition of At the Back of the North Wind.

== Reception ==
A review of Alice's Adventures in Wonderland (1904) in The Advance magazine said of it "Fifty-seven illustrations by M. L. Kirk and John Tenniel will keep the small reader at fever heat."

== List of books illustrated ==
- Kate Upson Clark, That Mary Ann: the Story of a Country Summer (Boston: D. Lothrop Co., 1893)
- Theodora R. Jenness, Piokee and Her People (Boston: D. Lothrop Co., 1894)
- "Pansy", Pansy's Sunday Book: For afternoon readers :gems of literature and art, with numerous illustrations (Boston: Lothrop Publishing Co., 1896)
- Lewis Carroll, Alice's Adventures in Wonderland (New York: Frederick A. Stokes Co., 1904)
- George MacDonald, At the Back of the North Wind (Philadelphia: J. B. Lippincott & Co., 1904)
- Mother Goose Favorites, M.A. Donohue & Co, No. 800, Linennear, Early 1900s, undated cloth book
- Ouida, A Dog of Flanders, the Nürnberg Stove, and Other Stories (Philadelphia: J. B. Lippincott & Co., 1909)
- George Daulton, The Helter Skelters (New York: Frederick A. Stokes Co., 1909)
- Adelheid Wette, translated Norreys J. O’Conor, Hänsel and Gretel: a fairy opera adapted from the libretto (New York: Frederick A. Stokes Co., 1909)
- Jean Ingelow, Mopsa the Fairy (Philadelphia: J. B. Lippincott & Co., 1910)
- Favorite Rhymes of Mother Goose (New York: Cupples & Leon, 1910)
- Winston Stokes, The Story of Hiawatha, Adapted from Longfellow by Winston Stokes (New York: Frederick A. Stokes Co., 1910)
- Hans Christian Andersen, Tales from Hans Andersen (Philadelphia & London: J. B. Lippincott & Co., 1911)
- Frances Hodgson Burnett, The Secret Garden (New York: Frederick A. Stokes Co., 1911)
- Fergus Hume, Chronicles of Fairyland (Philadelphia & London: J. B. Lippincott & Co., 1911)
- Sara Tawney Lefferts, ed., Land of Play: Verses, Rhymes and Stories (Cupples & Leon Co., 1911)
- All Shakespeare's Tales: Tales from Shakespeare by Charles and Mary Lamb, and Tales from Shakespeare by Winston Stokes (New York: Frederick A. Stokes Co., 1911)
- Inez N. McFee, The Story of Idylls of the King, adapted from Tennyson, by Inez N. McFee, with the original poem (New York: Frederick A. Stokes Co., 1912)
- Clayton Edwards, The Story of Evangeline, Adapted from Longfellow. With the Original Poem (New York: The Hampton Publishing Co., 1913)
- Mrs Molesworth, The Cuckoo Clock (J. B. Lippincott & Co., 1914)
- F. J. Harvey Darton, The Story of the Canterbury Pilgrims Retold from Chaucer and Others (J. B. Lippincott & Co., 1914)
- George MacDonald, The Princess and Curdie (1914)
- Johanna Spyri, Heidi (Philadelphia: J. B. Lippincott & Co., 1915)
- Emma C. Dowd, DOODLES the Sunshine Boy (Grosset & Dunlap, 1915)
- Lucy Maud Montgomery, Anne's House of Dreams (Toronto: McClelland, Goodchild, & Stewart, 1917)
- Stella George Stern Perry, The Angel of Christmas: a vision of to-day (New York: Frederick A. Stokes Co., 1917)
- Charles Kingsley, The Water Babies (J. B. Lippincott & Co., 1918)
- Miss Mulock, The Adventures of a Brownie (Philadelphia: J. B. Lippincott & Co., 1918)
- Emma C. Dowd, Polly and the Princess (Boston: Houghton Mifflin, 1917)
- Lucy Maud Montgomery, Rainbow Valley (Toronto: McClelland & Stewart, 1919; New York: Frederick A. Stokes Co., 1919)
- Robert Louis Stevenson, A Child's Garden of Verses (Philadelphia & London: J. B. Lippincott Co., 1919)
- Carlo Collodi, Pinocchio: The Story of a Puppet (Philadelphia & London: J. B. Lippincott & Co., 1919)
- Johanna Spyri, Cornelli (Philadelphia & London: J. B. Lippincott & Co., 1920)
- John Ruskin, The King of the Golden River, and Dame Wiggins of Lee and her seven wonderful cats (Philadelphia: J. B. Lippincott & Co., 1921)
- Lucy Maud Montgomery, Rilla of Ingleside (Toronto: McClelland & Stewart, 1921)
- Johanna Spyri, Mäzli : a story of the Swiss valleys (New York, 1921)
- Johanna Spyri, Vinzi: a Story of the Swiss Alps (J. B. Lippincott & Co., 1923)
- Lucy Maud Montgomery, Emily of New Moon (Toronto: McClelland & Stewart, 1923; New York: Frederick A. Stokes Co., 1923)
- Johanna Spyri, Dora (Philadelphia & London: J. B. Lippincott & Co., 1924)
- Lucy Maud Montgomery, Emily Climbs (New York: Frederick A. Stokes Co., 1925)
- Lucy Maud Montgomery, Emily's Quest (New York: Frederick A. Stokes Co., 1927)
- Johanna Spyri, Moni, the Goat Boy (Philadelphia: J. B. Lippincott & Co., 1927)
- A. C. Darby, Skip-come-a-Lou (New York: Frederick A. Stokes Co., 1928)
- George MacDonald, At the Back of the North Wind, illustrated by Maria L. Kirk (London: Folio Society, 2009)

== Other works illustrated ==
- Wide Awake, Volume 36, Issue 5 (Boston, April 1893)

== Gallery ==
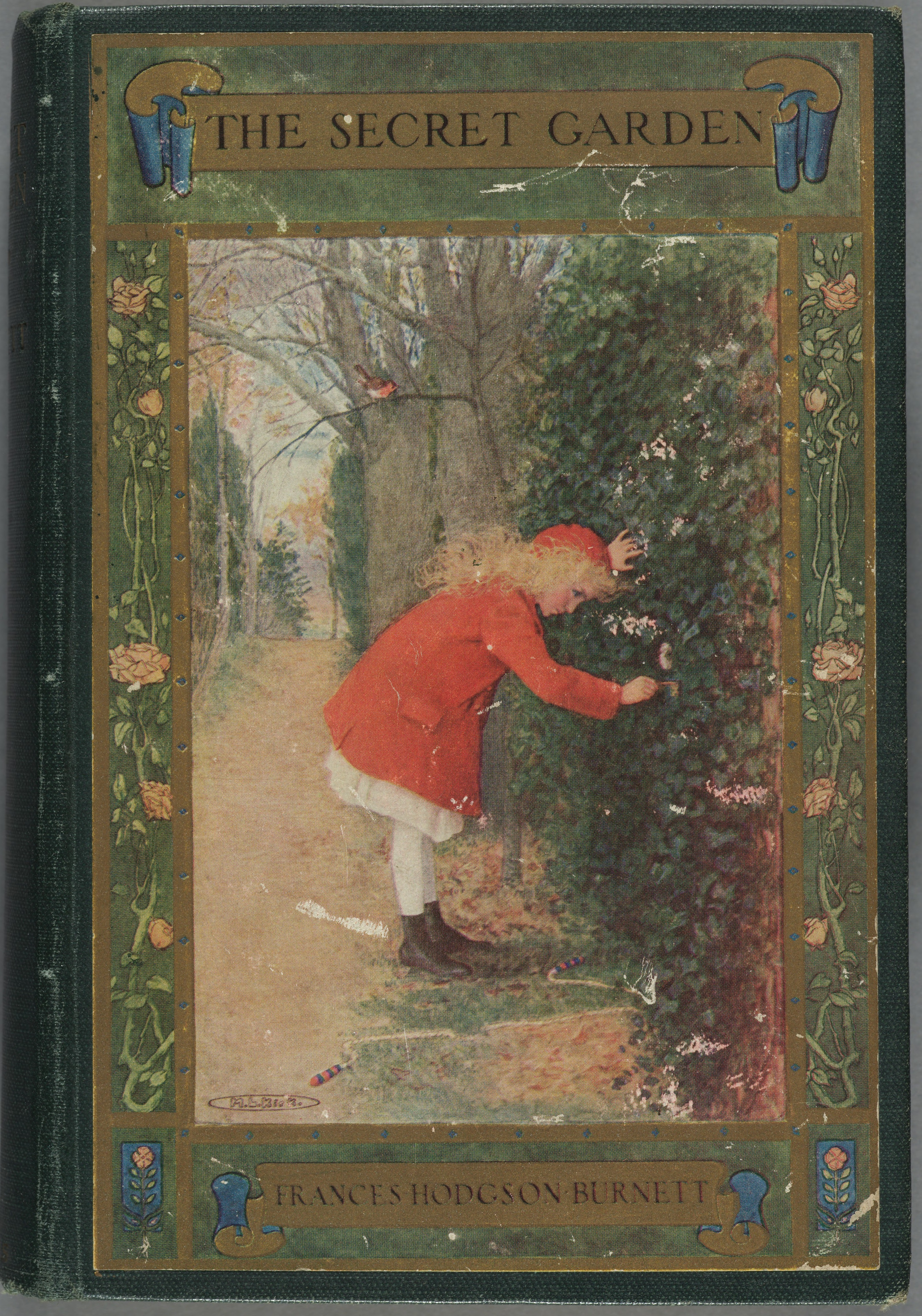
Cover of American edition of The Secret Garden

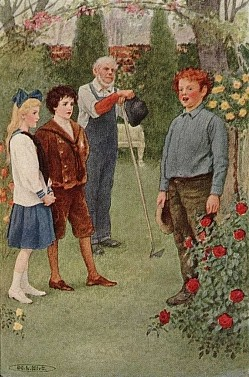
from The Secret Garden

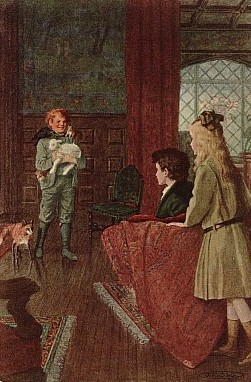
from The Secret Garden

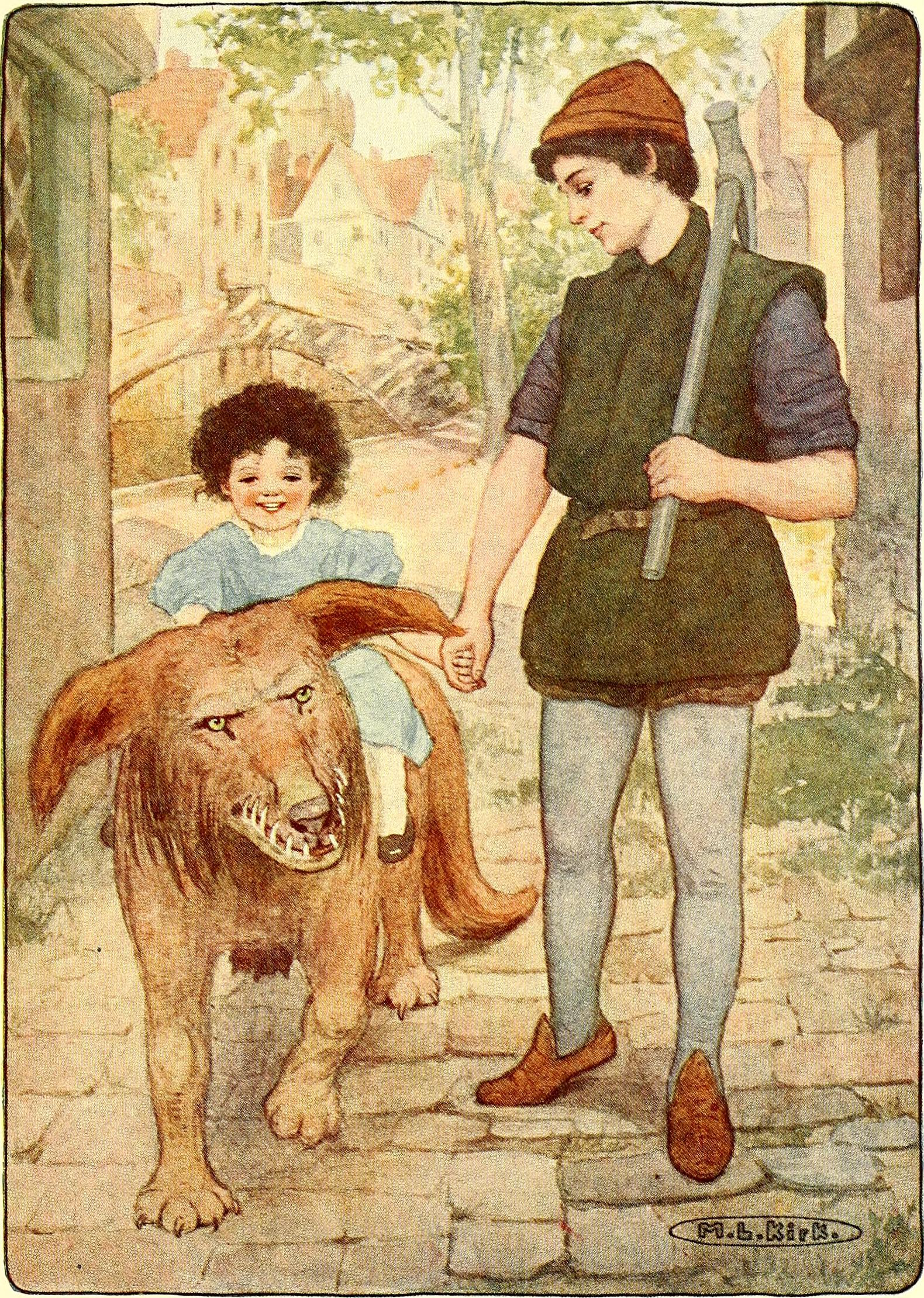
"So he set her on Lina's back" from The Princess and Curdie

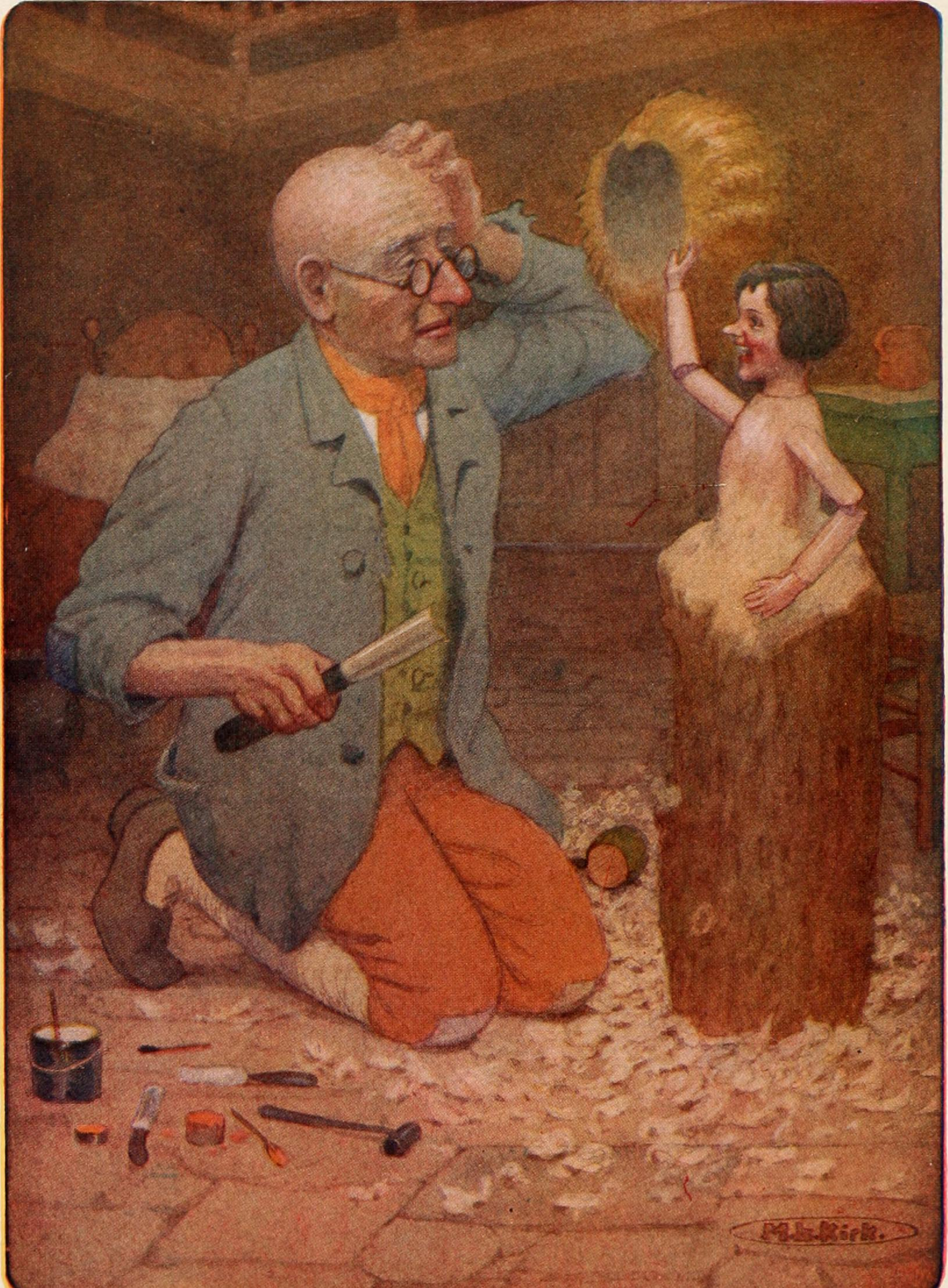
from Pinocchio

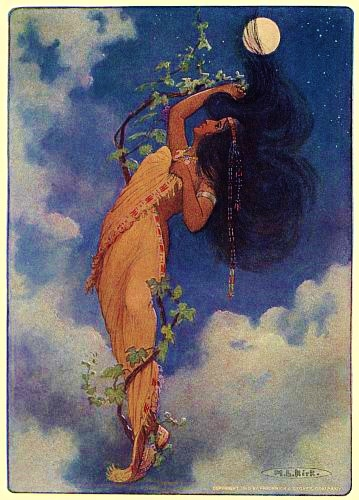
from The Story of Hiawatha

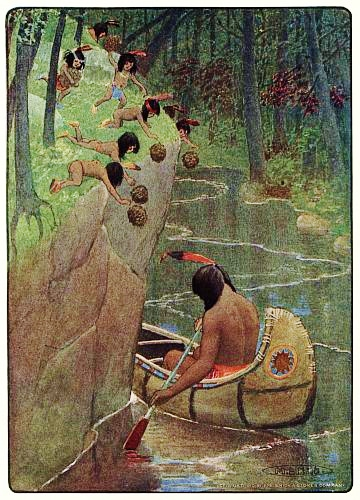
from The Story of Hiawatha

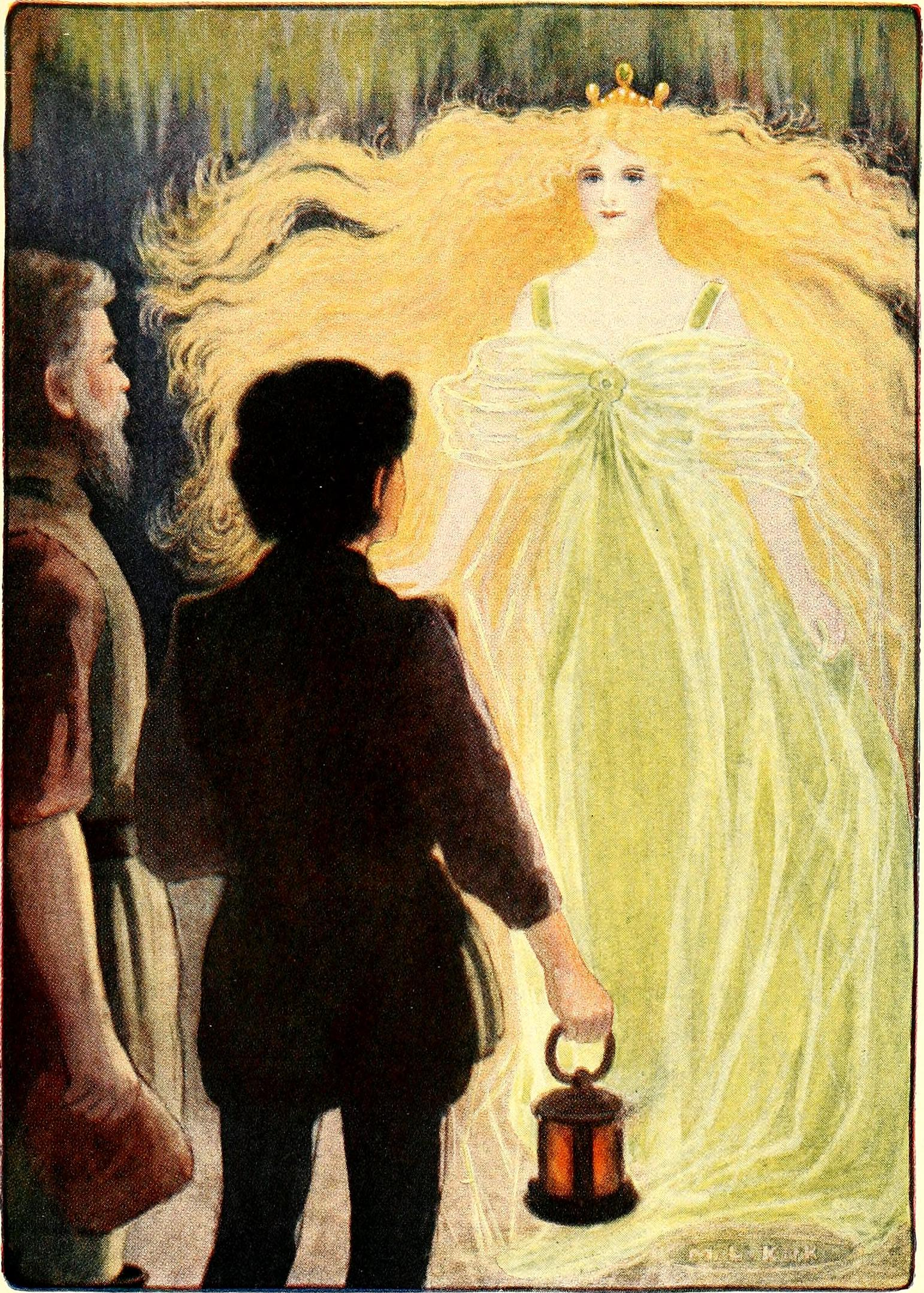
from The Princess and Curdie
