= Rilla of Ingleside =

1921 novel by Lucy Maud Montgomery

- First edition
- Author: Lucy Maud Montgomery
- Illustrator: Maria Louise Kirk
- Language: English
- Series: Anne of Green Gables
- Genre: Canadian literature
- Publisher: McClelland & Stewart (Canada); Frederick A. Stokes Company (US)
- Publication date: 1921
- Publication place: Canada
- Media type: Print (hardback & paperback)
- Preceded by: Rainbow Valley
- Followed by: Anne of Windy Poplars
- Text: Rilla of Ingleside at Wikisource

Rilla of Ingleside is the eighth and last novel in the Anne of Green Gables series by Lucy Maud Montgomery, published in 1921, but was the sixth "Anne" novel in publication order. This book draws the focus back onto a single character, Anne and Gilbert's youngest daughter Bertha Marilla "Rilla" Blythe. It has a more serious tone, as it takes place during World War I and the three Blythe boys—Jem, Walter, and Shirley—along with Rilla's sweetheart Ken Ford, playmates Jerry Meredith and Carl Meredith—end up fighting in Europe with the Canadian Expeditionary Force.

The book is dedicated: "To the memory of FREDERICA CAMPBELL MACFARLANE who went away from me when the dawn broke on January 25, 1919—a true friend, a rare personality, a loyal and courageous soul." Frederica, Maud's cousin and best friend, grew up in Park Corner, PEI, but died in the Spanish flu. Frederica may have been the model for Diana Barry, Anne of Green Gables' "bosom friend": both had unusual, non-Christian first names, and the fictional Diana's husband was named, perhaps not coincidentally, Fred.

Rilla of Ingleside is the only Canadian novel written from a woman's perspective about the First World War by a contemporary. The novel is also groundbreaking as it is one of the first non-Australian texts to mention the Gallipoli campaign and the sacrifice made by the ANZACs.

At some point after Montgomery's death in 1942, publishers quietly trimmed Rilla of Ingleside of a few thousand words, removing among other things passages containing historically accurate but now offensive anti-German sentiment. The trimmed version was the only available "in print" version for decades, until a new, restored and annotated edition of Rilla of Ingleside, edited by Benjamin Lefebvre (editor of Montgomery's The Blythes Are Quoted) and Andrea McKenzie, was published by Viking Canada in October 2010.

== Plot summary ==
Set almost a decade after Rainbow Valley, Europe is on the brink of the First World War, and Anne's youngest daughter Rilla is an irrepressible almost-15-year-old, excited about her first adult party and blissfully unaware of the chaos that the Western world is about to enter. Her parents worry because Rilla seems not to have any ambition, is not interested in attending college, and is more concerned with having fun. Rilla was needlessly worried whether any boy would dance with her. Kenneth Ford dances with her, and they spend time together away from the crowd.

Once the Continent descends into war, Jem Blythe and Jerry Meredith promptly enlist, upsetting Anne, Nan, and Faith Meredith (who Rilla suspects is engaged to Jem). Rilla's brother Walter, who is of age, does not enlist, ostensibly due to a recent bout with typhoid but truly because he fears the ugliness of war and death. He confides in Rilla that he feels he is a coward. Rilla was a bit happy because she was closer to Walter than to her brother Jem.

The enlisted boys report to Kingsport for training. Jem's dog, Dog Monday, takes up a vigil at the Glen train station waiting for Jem to come back. Rilla's siblings Nan, Di, and Walter return to Redmond College, and Shirley returns to Queen's Academy, leaving Rilla anxiously alone at home with her parents, their spinster housekeeper Susan Baker, and Gertrude Oliver, a teacher who is boarding with the Blythes while her fiancé reports to the front.

As the war drags on, Rilla matures, organizing the Junior Red Cross in her village. While collecting donations for the war effort, she comes across a house where a young mother has just died with her husband away at war, leaving no one to care for her two-week-old son. Rilla takes the sickly little boy back to Ingleside in a soup tureen, naming him "James Kitchener Anderson" after his father and, on the insistence of Susan, Lord Kitchener, the British Secretary of State for War. Rilla's father Gilbert challenges her to raise the war orphan, and although she doesn't like babies at all, she rises to the occasion, eventually coming to love "Jims" as her own. She also assists in the elopement of a soldier whose beloved is Miranda Pryor, the daughter of the town's only vocal pacifist; the pacifist's attempts to oppose fund-raising for the war effort or to criticize the war while leading prayers are a recurring minor storyline.

Rilla and her family pay anxious attention to all the war news as the conflict spreads and thousands die. Rilla grows much closer to Walter, who some townsfolk and fellow students have branded a slacker, an insult he feels deeply. Rilla feels that Walter finally regards her as a chum, not just as his little sister. Walter eventually does enlist, as does Rilla's newfound love interest, Kenneth Ford (the son of Owen and Leslie Ford, who met in Anne's House of Dreams), who kisses her before leaving and asks her to promise she will not kiss anyone else until he returns. She keeps this a secret for much of the book, unsure what it means about his feelings for her. Her mother later tells her that "If Leslie Ford's son asked you to keep your lips for him, I think you may consider yourself engaged to him."

As the war continues, one night Dog Monday begins to howl inconsolably, leading the family to fear something terrible has happened to Jem. Instead, they receive news that Walter was killed in action at Courcelette. (In Anne of Ingleside, published in 1939 but set many years before Rilla of Ingleside, Montgomery foreshadows Walter's death; Anne sees the shadow of a cross cast from the window over sleeping Walter's head.) In Walter's last letter to Rilla, written the day before his death, he tells her that he is no longer afraid and believes it may be better for him to die than to go on living with his memories of war forever spoiling life's beauty. Rilla gives the letter to Una Meredith, as she has long believed Una had been in love with Walter, though she had never spoken of it to either of them. After Rilla had gone back to Ingleside that night, Una swore that she would not let love enter her life again.

Anne's youngest son, Shirley, comes of age and immediately joins the flying corps. Susan was deeply touched when Shirley called her "Mother Susan" before he went. Jerry Meredith is wounded at Vimy Ridge, and in early May 1918, Jem is reported wounded and missing following a trench raid. The Blythes spend nearly five months not knowing Jem's fate, but are encouraged by Dog Monday's continued presence at the train station, as Susan reasons a dog so troubled by the death of his master's brother surely would sense a tragedy involving his master. Finally the family receives a telegram: Jem had been taken prisoner in Germany, but eventually escaped to Holland and is now proceeding to England for medical treatment.

When the war finally ends, the rest of the boys from Glen St. Mary return home. Mary Vance and Miller Douglas announce plans to marry, with Miller deciding to pursue a career in Mr. Flagg's store after losing a leg in the war. Jem returns on an afternoon train and is met by a joyful Dog Monday. Jims' father returns with a young merry English bride and takes Jims to live with them nearby; Rilla is glad she can still remain part of Jims' life.

Life after war resumes. Jem plans to return to college, since he and Faith cannot be married until he finishes studying medicine. Faith, Nan, and Diana plan to teach school, while Jerry, Carl, and Shirley will return to Redmond, along with Una, who plans to take a Household Science course. Noting that Kenneth Ford has survived the war but has not contacted her, Rilla concludes that his interest must have faded and she should consider joining the college-bound group. Una and Walter share a romantic bond that Montgomery hints at, but their story is cut short by his death.

Finally, Kenneth returns home and proposes to Rilla with the question "Is it Rilla-my-Rilla?"—to which Rilla lisps, "Yeth," a rare slip into her childhood habit.

== Series ==
Montgomery continued the story of Anne Shirley in a series of sequels. They are listed in the order of Anne's age in each novel.

Lucy Maud Montgomery's books on Anne Shirley
#	Book	Date published	Anne Shirley's age
1	Anne of Green Gables	1908	11 — 16
2	Anne of Avonlea	1909	16 — 18
3	Anne of the Island	1915	18 — 22
4	Anne of Windy Poplars	1936	22 — 25
5	Anne's House of Dreams	1917	25 — 27
6	Anne of Ingleside	1939	34 — 40
7	Rainbow Valley	1919	41
8	Rilla of Ingleside	1921	49 — 53

Related books in which Anne Shirley plays a lesser part
#	Book	Date published	Anne Shirley's age
—	Chronicles of Avonlea	1912	—
—	Further Chronicles of Avonlea	1920	—
—	The Blythes Are Quoted	2009	—

== See also ==
- White Feather Campaign
