= Anne of Avonlea =

1909 novel by Lucy Maud Montgomery

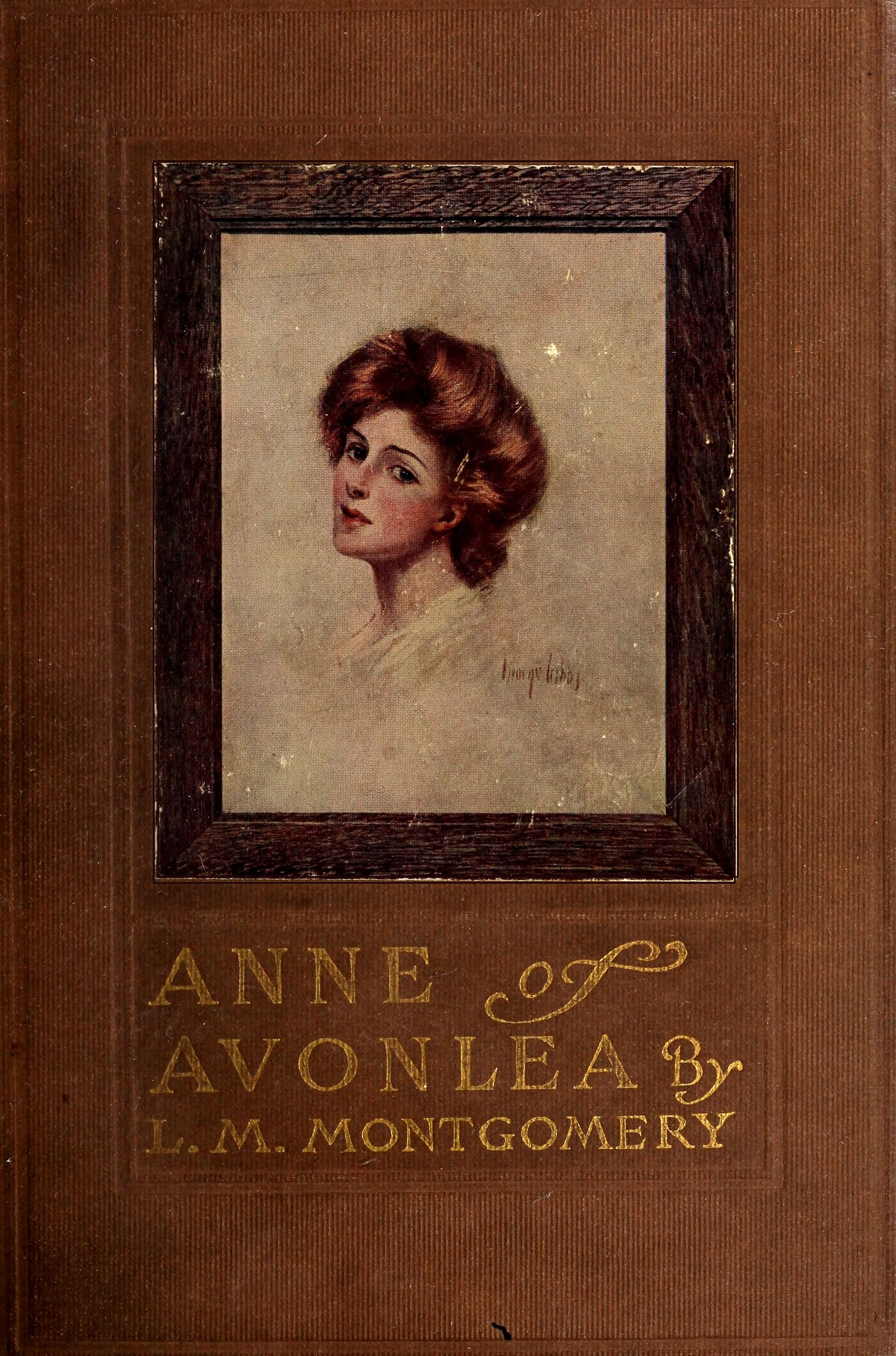
- First edition
- Author: Lucy Maud Montgomery
- Language: English
- Series: Anne of Green Gables
- Genre: Canadian literature, children's literature
- Publisher: L. C. Page & Co.
- Publication date: September, 1909
- Publication place: Boston
- Preceded by: Anne of Green Gables
- Followed by: Anne of the Island
- Text: Anne of Avonlea at Wikisource

Anne of Avonlea is a 1909 novel by the Canadian author Lucy Maud Montgomery, who published as L. M. Montgomery. The first sequel to Montgomery's Anne of Green Gables (1908), the book covers the second chapter in the life of Anne Shirley, from the age of 16 to 18, during the two years that she teaches at the Avonlea school on Prince Edward Island.

== Title ==
Anne takes her place among the "important" and "grown up" people of Avonlea society, as its only schoolteacher. She is also a founding member of the Avonlea Village Improvement Society (A.V.I.S.), which tries to improve (with questionable results) the Avonlea landscape.

== Themes ==
Montgomery was brought up with a traditional Scots Presbyterian education. John Knox's famous dictum "A school in every village, a college in every town" had been embraced by the Presbyterian church, and Montgomery was brought up in a culture that greatly valued education. At the same time, Montgomery's education had been extremely disciplinarian. Montgomery had followed the theories of educational reformers like John Dewey, and this tension between traditional education vs. the new theories was reflected in Anne of Avonlea as Anne spends much time arguing about the merits of whipping students vs persuasion as teaching methods. In the book, Anne has her students write essays about their thoughts and feelings in place of rote learning.

== Plot summary ==
Anne is about to start her first term teaching at the Avonlea school, although she will still continue her studies at home with Gilbert, who is teaching at the nearby White Sands School. The book soon introduces Anne's new and problematic neighbour, Mr. Harrison, and his foul-mouthed parrot, as well as the twins, Davy and Dora. They are the children of Marilla Cuthbert's third cousin and she takes them in when their mother dies while their uncle is out of the country. Dora is a nice, well-behaved girl, somewhat boring in her perfect behaviour. Davy is Dora's exact opposite, much more of a handful and constantly getting into many scrapes. They are initially meant to stay only a short time, but the twins' uncle postpones his return to collect the twins and then eventually dies. Both Anne and Marilla are relieved (Marilla inwardly) to know the twins will remain with them.

Other characters introduced are some of Anne's new pupils, such as Paul Irving, an American boy living with his grandmother in Avonlea while his widower father works in the States. He delights Anne with his imagination and whimsical ways, which are reminiscent of Anne's in her childhood. Later in the book, Anne and her friends meet Miss Lavendar Lewis, a sweet but lonely lady in her 40s who had been engaged to Paul's father 25 years before, but parted from him after a disagreement. At the end of the book, Mr. Irving returns and he and Miss Lavendar marry.

In the chapter entitled, "An Adventure on the Tory Road," Anne and Diana discuss the eponymous " 'Tory' Road," constructed and landscaped by " 'the Tory government'," provincial "Conservatives...'when they were in power just to show they were doing something.' " A resident also reminisces about adolescent courtship in her father's roadside home "twenty years ago." The Conservative majority dissolved amidst the 1867 Land Question politics of the Tenant League and regained the provincial government between 1870-91. 1896 Dominion elections similarly inspired author L.M. Montgomery to fictionalize "Conservative" reactions to Liberal "Grit" ascension in the 1917 Anne's House of Dreams. Both novels traverse multiple temporalities and timelines in a politics of post-Confederation memory.

Anne discovers the delights and troubles of being a teacher, takes part in the raising of Davy and Dora, and organizes the A.V.I.S. (Avonlea Village Improvement Society) together with Gilbert, Diana, and Fred Wright, though their efforts to improve the town are not always successful. The Society takes up a subscription to repaint an old town hall, only to have the painter provide the wrong colour of paint, turning the hall into a bright blue eyesore. The trials and travails of the A.V.I.S. further represented the lackluster results of an imagined bipartisan effort to interweave "Liberal" notions of rural "secularization" with "Conservative" temporal ideas on urban "modernities."

Towards the end of the book, Mrs. Rachel Lynde's husband dies and Mrs. Lynde moves in with Marilla at Green Gables, allowing Anne to go to college at last. She and Gilbert make plans to attend Redmond College in the Autumn.

This book sees Anne maturing slightly, even though she still cannot avoid getting into a number of her familiar scrapes, including selling Mr. Harrison's cow after mistaking it for her own, accidentally rubbing red dye on her nose before meeting a famous author, and getting stuck in a duck house roof while peeping into a pantry window.

== Characters ==
Anne Shirley - Once an impetuous and awkward orphan, Anne has matured and now serves as the teacher of the Avonlea school. She is described as being slim and lithe, having starry grey eyes and hair that charitable friends describe as auburn. She still has not lost her imaginative, creative spirit and charms nearly everyone she meets.

Marilla Cuthbert - The woman who took Anne in five years before, along with her late brother Matthew. To the outsider, she may still seem austere, but Marilla has become more emotionally demonstrative, and what was once described as the "glimmerings" has developed into a fuller sense of humour.

Gilbert Blythe - Anne's childhood enemy and now good friend. Gilbert is also a teacher at the nearby White Sands School. He is in love with Anne but does not yet admit it to her.

Diana Barry - Anne's bosom friend since childhood. Diana is described as having beautiful black hair and a rosy complexion. She is less imaginative than Anne, but remains a completely loyal friend.

Rachel Lynde - Marilla's best friend and neighbour, an outspoken and opinionated, but well-intentioned woman. Though she still argues with Anne, she is genuinely fond of her.

Davy Keith - One of the twins whom Marilla takes in. Davy is mischievous, naughty, loves to eat sweets and rarely does what he is told. He has blonde hair in ringlets all over his head, one dimple, roguish hazel eyes, a snub nose and is often smiling.

Dora Keith - Dora, Davy's sister, is his opposite. She does everything she is told without mistake and is very docile. She has fair, long, sleek curls, mild hazel eyes, a straight nose and "prunes and prisms" mouth.

Jane Andrews - Anne's childhood friend, also a teacher at the Newbridge School.

Fred Wright - A friend of Gilbert's, who plans to follow in his father's footsteps as a farmer. Fred and Diana become engaged, although he falls short of Anne's romantic vision of a dashing dream husband.

Mr. J.A. Harrison - Anne and Marilla's bad-tempered new neighbour. Anne wins him over and they become good friends. He has a grounded, practical attitude and blunt, sometimes hurtful, manners. He inherited a foul-mouthed parrot named Ginger who comes between Mr. Harrison and those he holds dearest even, at times, Anne, who it persists in referring to as a "red-headed snippet."

Paul Irving - One of Anne's students, an imaginative young boy and a fast friend for Anne. He was raised in the United States and has come to Avonlea to live with his paternal grandmother.

Anthony Pye - another of Anne's students, and initially her most difficult. He tests Anne's patience, by releasing a mouse in class, to the point that she finally snaps and gives him a whipping. Although she is horrified at herself afterwards, she does win his respect, and his behaviour improves.

Miss Lavendar Lewis - An imaginative, attractive, old maid with snow white hair who Anne and Diana come across on their way to a friend's place. She lives in Echo Lodge. She also becomes good friends with Anne.

Charlotta the Fourth - Miss Lavendar's maid. Her real name is Leonora and she is the youngest of four girls who have all been employed by Miss Lavendar. Her eldest sister was named Charlotta and Miss Lavendar kept referring to Charlotta's three sisters as "Charlotta" as well. Charlotta is well-meaning, but a bit awkward, and addresses everyone as either "Sir" or "Ma'am".

Stephen Irving - Paul's father and Miss Lavendar's sweetheart from her youth. The two had an argument before Paul was born and Mr. Irving left for the States and married Paul's mother. They are once again reconciled by Anne many years after Mr. Irving's first wife's death.

Priscilla Grant - An old classmate of Anne's from Queens Academy.

== Series ==
Montgomery continued the story of Anne Shirley in a series of sequels. They are listed in the order of Anne's age in each novel.

Lucy Maud Montgomery's books on Anne Shirley
| # | Book | Date published | Anne Shirley's age |
| 1 | Anne of Green Gables | 1908 | 11 – 16 |
| 2 | Anne of Avonlea | 1909 | 16 – 18 |
| 3 | Anne of the Island | 1915 | 18 – 22 |
| 4 | Anne of Windy Poplars | 1936 | 22 – 25 |
| 5 | Anne's House of Dreams | 1917 | 25 – 27 |
| 6 | Anne of Ingleside | 1939 | 34 – 40 |
| 7 | Rainbow Valley | 1919 | 41 – 48 |
| 8 | Rilla of Ingleside | 1921 | 49 – 53 |

Related books in which Anne Shirley plays a lesser part
| # | Book | Date published | Anne Shirley's age |
| — | Chronicles of Avonlea | 1912 | — |
| — | Further Chronicles of Avonlea | 1920 | — |
| — | The Blythes Are Quoted | 2009 | — |

== Adaptations ==
The 1975 miniseries Anne of Avonlea, a sequel to the lost 1972 miniseries Anne of Green Gables starring Kim Braden as Anne, is based on this novel as well as the following book, Anne of the Island.

The book formed the basis for the 1987 CBC Television miniseries Anne of Green Gables: The Sequel, which aired as Anne of Avonlea on the Disney Channel in the United States, as the sequel to the 1985 film Anne of Green Gables.

The first act of the 2005 musical Anne & Gilbert is based on this novel, with the second act based on Anne of the Island.

The 2025 animated television series Anne Shirley, produced in Japan by The Answer Studio and directed by Hiroshi Kawamata, adapts the novel in episodes 11–15.
