= Anne of the Island =

1915 novel by Lucy Maud Montgomery

- First edition
- Author: Lucy Maud Montgomery
- Cover artist: H. Weston Taylor
- Language: English
- Series: Anne of Green Gables
- Genre: Canadian literature
- Publisher: L. C. Page & Co.
- Publication date: 1915
- Publication place: Canada
- Media type: Print (hardcover)
- Preceded by: Anne of Avonlea
- Followed by: Anne's House of Dreams
- Text: Anne of the Island at Wikisource

Anne of the Island is the third novel in the Anne of Green Gables series by Lucy Maud Montgomery, published in 1915. The plot sees Anne Shirley leave Green Gables in Avonlea, Prince Edward Island, for the first time to attend Redmond College in Kingsport, Nova Scotia.

== Title ==
While studying away from Prince Edward Island, and in particular when visiting the place of her birth, Anne finds herself identifying the Island as her true home. When meeting Philippa Gordon, who is from Anne's birthplace of Bolingbroke, she denies being a "Bluenose" (a nickname for someone from Nova Scotia) and considers herself an Islander to the core.

== Plot summary ==
Anne leaves Green Gables and her work as a teacher in Avonlea to pursue her original dream (which she had given up in Anne of Green Gables) of taking further education at Redmond College in Kingsport, Nova Scotia. Gilbert Blythe and Charlie Sloane enroll as well, as does Anne's friend from Queen's Academy, Priscilla Grant. During her first week of school, Anne befriends Philippa "Phil" Gordon, a beautiful girl whose frivolous ways charm her. Phil also happens to be from Anne's birthplace in Bolingbroke, Nova Scotia.

The girls spend their first year in boardinghouses and decide to set up house thereafter in a lovely cottage called Patty's Place, near campus. Meanwhile, Anne's childhood friend Ruby Gillis dies of consumption (tuberculosis) very soon after finding her own true love. The girls enter their second year at Redmond happily ensconced at Patty's Place, along with Queen's classmate Stella Maynard and her "Aunt Jimsie" (their chaperone), while life continues in Avonlea. Diana Barry marries Fred Wright and Davy and Dora continue to keep Marilla busy.

Midway through their college years, Gilbert Blythe, who has always loved Anne, proposes to her but Anne rejects him; although she and Gilbert are very close, she holds sentimental fantasies about true love (all featuring a tall, dark, handsome, inscrutable hero) and does not recognize her true feelings for Gilbert. Gilbert leaves, his heart broken, and the two drift apart.

Anne later welcomes the courtship of Roy Gardner, a darkly handsome Redmond student who showers her with attention and poetic gestures. However, when he proposes after two years, Anne abruptly realizes that Roy does not really belong in her life, and that she had only been in love with the idea of him as the embodiment of her childhood ideal.

Anne is so ashamed of her treatment of Roy that she fears having wasted her entire Redmond experience. She returns to Green Gables, a "full-fledged B.A.", but finds herself a bit lonely. Diana gives birth to her first child, and Jane Andrews, an old school friend, marries a Winnipeg millionaire. Having received an offer to be the principal of the Summerside school in the autumn, Anne is keeping herself occupied over the summer when she learns that Gilbert is gravely ill with typhoid fever. With shock, Anne finally realizes the depth of her true feelings for Gilbert, and endures a terrifying night of fearing that he will die without knowing her feelings. In the morning, Anne gratefully learns that Gilbert will survive. Gilbert recovers over the summer, bolstered by a letter from Phil assuring him that there is really nothing between Anne and Roy. After several visits to Green Gables, Gilbert and Anne take a late summer walk in Hester Gray's garden, and finally become engaged.

== Characters ==
- Anne Shirley - Now a student at Redmond College, Anne has become an elegant, smart young woman.
- Marilla Cuthbert - The stern, upright woman who took Anne in when she was just a girl. She lives at Green Gables with Davy and Dora Keith, her deceased third cousin's twins.
- Gilbert Blythe - Anne's childhood rival and now good friend. Gilbert is now studying at Redmond College and is in Anne's class. After many years, he finally admits his love for Anne and proposes to her. He is rejected the first time but after a near-fatal illness, he proposes again, and Anne accepts him.
- Charlie Sloane - An old schoolmate who has feelings for Anne, but who Anne has always felt indifferent towards and is now in her class at Redmond College. He proposes to Anne but is rejected.
- Priscilla Grant - Anne's friend from Queen's Academy, Priscilla is one of Anne's roommates at Patty's Place.
- Stella Maynard - Anne's friend from Queen's Academy, Stella is one of Anne's roommates at Patty's Place.
- Philippa Gordon - Anne's new friend from Redmond College, Philippa (or Phil for short) is playful and charming and can't choose between her beaus. However, she is also a loyal friend and plays an essential role in bringing Anne and Gilbert together at the end.
- Aunt Jamesina - Stella Maynard's aunt, who lives with the girls as housekeeper at Patty's Place.
- Roy Gardner - A handsome Redmond student whom Anne at first thinks is her dream man having become friends after he shared his umbrella with her. He courts Anne for two years. Anne is at first enamoured by his romantic gestures, but eventually finds him rather dull and humourless and rejects his proposal.
- Diana Barry - Anne's kindred spirit since childhood. The two remain best friends, even as Diana marries and starts a family.
- Davy Keith - One of the twins whom Marilla took in, Davy is mischievous but sweet at heart, and idolizes Anne. He has fair, fuzzy ringlets all over his head, one dimple, roguish hazel eyes, a snub nose and is often smiling.
- Dora Keith - Davy's sister. Completely the contrary of her brother, Dora meekly obeys every instruction carefully. She has sleek curls, hazel eyes, a straight nose and "prunes and prisms" mouth.
- Rachel Lynde - Formerly Marilla and Anne's neighbour, who has since moved to Green Gables after the death of her husband Thomas. Although outspoken and demanding, she is well-intentioned and kindhearted.
- Ruby Gillis - Anne's childhood friend. Ruby is fair and beautiful and prepared to marry when she discovers that she is gravely ill and dies later in the book.
- Jane Andrews - Anne's childhood friend. Jane is a teacher who meets and marries an older millionaire, much to Mrs. Andrews' delight.
- Billy Andrews - Jane's slow-witted brother, who is Anne's first proposal. Too bashful to go courting, he uses his sister as an intermediary. Anne is disappointed but amused by the situation's lack of romance and rejects him.

== Series ==
Montgomery continued the story of Anne Shirley in a series of sequels. They are listed in the order of Anne's age in each novel.

Lucy Maud Montgomery's books on Anne Shirley
#	Book	Date published	Anne Shirley's age
1	Anne of Green Gables	1908	11 — 16
2	Anne of Avonlea	1909	16 — 18
3	Anne of the Island	1915	18 — 22
4	Anne of Windy Poplars	1936	22 — 25
5	Anne's House of Dreams	1917	25 — 27
6	Anne of Ingleside	1939	34 — 40
7	Rainbow Valley	1919	41
8	Rilla of Ingleside	1921	49 — 53

Related books in which Anne Shirley plays a lesser part
#	Book	Date published	Anne Shirley's age
—	Chronicles of Avonlea	1912	—
—	Further Chronicles of Avonlea	1920	—
—	The Blythes Are Quoted	2009	—

== Adaptations ==
The last two episodes of the six-part miniseries Anne of Avonlea (1975), starring Kim Braden, are based on Anne of the Island.

The television mini-series Anne of Green Gables: The Sequel (1987), starring Megan Follows, was largely inspired by this book.

The second act of the musical Anne & Gilbert (2005) is based on Anne of the Island. The first act is based on Anne of Avonlea.

The animated television series Anne Shirley (2025), produced in Japan by The Answer Studio and directed by Hiroshi Kawamata, adapts the novel in episodes 16–24.
