= Anne of Green Gables (1934 film) =

1934 film by George Nicholls, Jr.

- Theatrical release poster
- Directed by: George Nicholls, Jr.
- Written by: Sam Mintz
- Based on: Anne of Green Gables; 1908 novel by Lucy Maud Montgomery
- Produced by: Kenneth Macgowan
- Starring: Anne Shirley; Helen Westley; Tom Brown; Sara Haden; Charley Grapewin; Bonita Granville; Ben Hall; Ann Miller; Paul Stanton
- Cinematography: Lucien Andriot
- Edited by: Arthur P. Schmidt
- Music by: Alberto Colombo; Max Steiner; Roy Webb
- Production company: RKO Radio Pictures
- Distributed by: RKO Radio Pictures
- Release date: November 23, 1934
- Running time: 78 minutes
- Country: United States
- Language: English
- Budget: $226,000
- Box office: $793,000

Anne of Green Gables is a 1934 American comedy drama film directed by George Nicholls, Jr., based upon the 1908 novel Anne of Green Gables by Canadian author Lucy Maud Montgomery. Dawn O'Day, who portrayed the title character in the film, changed her stage name to Anne Shirley, which she was billed as for this and all subsequent roles. The film was a surprise hit, becoming one of four top-grossing films RKO made that year as noted in The R.K.O. Story, published by Arlington House.

A sequel, Anne of Windy Poplars, was released in 1940.

== Plot ==
Anne Shirley is an orphan who has been adopted by farmer Matthew Cuthbert (O.P. Heggie) and his sister, Marilla (Helen Westley). Although the pair had originally asked to adopt an orphaned young boy to help on their farm, Anne endears herself to them and to the local villagers. She befriends Diana Barry and most of the children at her school, except for Gilbert Blythe after he calls her "carrots" (for her red hair) and she smashes her slate over his head. She and Diana have a bet that Anne can flirt with Gilbert, and he will fall head over heels in love with her. Little do they know Gilbert overheard them and has already fallen in love with Anne. Anne's flirtation remains unsuccessful, and Diana wins the bet. Anne lies to Gilbert that she has a boyfriend to make him jealous, but she only ends up embarrassing herself.

Shortly after, Anne is playing the Lady of Shalott when she realizes her boat is sinking, and Gilbert sees her and saves her life. She then decides to forgive him and give him a reward (a kiss) for saving her; Gilbert is surprised. Anne thinks he doesn't want to claim his reward, but he says he does and that he wants her to be his girl. For three years they have a secret courtship, but Mrs. Barry spies on them and tells Marilla, who does not want Anne to even talk to Gilbert because his mother broke Matthew's heart. Anne and Gilbert are both devastated, and Matthew is upset with Marilla because it wasn't she who got her heart broken.

Anne goes to college. Diana, who had gotten married, visits Anne and tells her Matthew is ill. Anne returns to Green Gables, finding out it's for sale to save Matthew because he needs the best doctor in Halifax. She remembers Gilbert is studying with a doctor, so she goes to see Gilbert. He tries flirting with her, and she eventually gives in and finds out Gilbert heard about Matthew and begged the doctor to save him for free, which he did. After Marilla finds out what he had done, she forgives the Blythes and lets Anne and Gilbert see each other again.

== Cast ==
- Anne Shirley as Anne Shirley
- Tom Brown as Gilbert Blythe
- Helen Westley as Marilla Cuthbert
- O.P. Heggie as Matthew Cuthbert
- Sara Haden as Mrs. Rachel Barry
- Murray Kinnell as Mr. Phillips, the teacher
- Gertrude Messinger as Diana Barry
- Charley Grapewin as Dr. Tatum
- Hilda Vaughn as Mrs. Blewett
- June Preston as Mrs. Blewett's daughter
- George Offerman Jr. as Herbert Root (uncredited)
- Paul Stanton as Dr. Terry (uncredited)

== Reception ==
The film made a profit of $272,000. The film is preserved with a copy at the Library of Congress.
