= Frederick A. Stokes =

American publisher

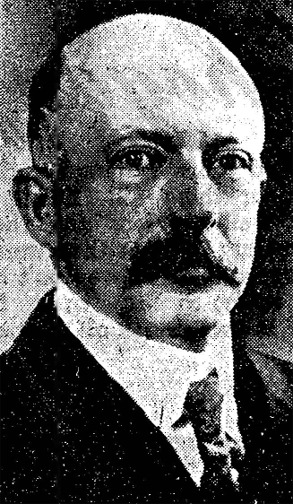
- Publicity photo portrait, 1932
- Born: November 4, 1857; Brooklyn, New York, U.S.
- Died: November 15, 1939 (aged 82); Manhattan, New York City
- Occupation: Publisher
- Known for: Publishing Frank Buck and James Branch Cabell
- Spouse: Ellen Colby Stokes

Frederick Abbott Stokes (November 4, 1857 – November 15, 1939) was an American publisher, founder and long-time head of the eponymous Frederick A. Stokes Company.

== Biography ==
Stokes graduated from Yale Law School in 1879. He worked at Dodd, Mead and Company for a year and in 1881 established White & Stokes, a partnership that became the Frederick A. Stokes Company in 1890. The Stokes businesses published more than 3,000 books in his 58 years, 1881 to 1939.

Stokes published established writers such as Frances Hodgson Burnett, Frank Buck, and Stephen Crane. He also published beginning writers such as James Branch Cabell, Maria Montessori, and Percival Wren. Best sellers included: The Story of Ferdinand, On Jungle Trails, Doctor Dolittle, When Worlds Collide, Guys and Dolls, and The Story of Little Black Sambo. Stokes was also known for publishing high quality art and children's books, such as "The Glue Series", a popular 17-volume series beginning with The House That Glue Built in 1905.

Stokes was an opponent of the new Book Clubs of the 1920s, and of modern advertising methods such as billboards and radio ads.

Stokes died in 1939, at age 82, in his home at 344 West 72nd Street, Manhattan. Many prominent people from the book industry attended his funeral service at the Church of the Incarnation (Episcopal). He was buried at Green-Wood Cemetery in Brooklyn.

Stokes left the publishing company to his sons Horace Winston and Frederick Brett, who were then the company treasurer and secretary. J. B. Lippincott acquired it in 1943.

== Authors ==
Authors' names are followed by dates of their known association with Frederick A. Stokes.

=== Writers ===
- Helen Bannerman, 1900
- Louis Bromfield, 1926
- Frank Buck, 1936
- Frances Hodgson Burnett, 1901
- James Branch Cabell
- Stephen Crane, 1899
- Edward S. Curtis, 1912
- Glenn Curtiss, 1912
- Ferrin Fraser, 1936
- Susan Glaspell, 1909–1931
- Owen Johnson. 1912–1915
- Munro Leaf, 1934–1942
- Lois Lenski, 1929–1943
- J. Thomas Looney, 1870 – 1944
- Sinclair Lewis, 1910–1912
- Hugh Lofting, 1920–1936
- Mary MacLane, 1917
- Elizabeth Cooper, 1914-1927
- Maria Montessori, 1912–1917
- L. M. Montgomery, 1917–1939
- Richard F. Outcault, 1904–1914
- Robert E. Peary, 1898–1912
- John J. Pershing, 1931
- Olive Higgins Prouty, 1919
- Ivana Brlić-Mažuranić, 1922
- Ellery Queen, 1929–1940
- Edward V. Rickenbacker, 1919
- W. Heath Robinson, 1925
- Damon Runyon, 1931–1938
- Walter C. Sweeney, Sr., 1924
- William M. Timlin, 1923
- Clara Andrews Williams, 1905–1926
- Percival Wren, 1925–1933
- Lee Wulff, 1939
- Philip Wylie, 1933–1934
- Isabel Briggs Myers, 1930-1934

=== Illustrators ===
- Joseph M. Gleeson, c. 1893
- Maria Louise Kirk, 1904–1927
- George Alfred Williams, 1905–1926

== Book series ==
- The Augustan Books of English Poetry
- The Augustan Books of Modern Poetry
- British Artists
- Collectors
- Distinguished American Artists
- The Glue Series (AKA The Glue Books)
- Library of Fiction
- Library of Irish Literature
- Masterpieces on Color
- Nations of the Modern World (jointly published with Ernest Benn, London)
- Nautilus Library
- Rescue Series
- Romance of Reality
- Thistle Library
- Twentieth Century Series
- Vignette Edition

== See also ==
- Pocket Magazine, published by Stokes
