= Christopher Blake =

British actor

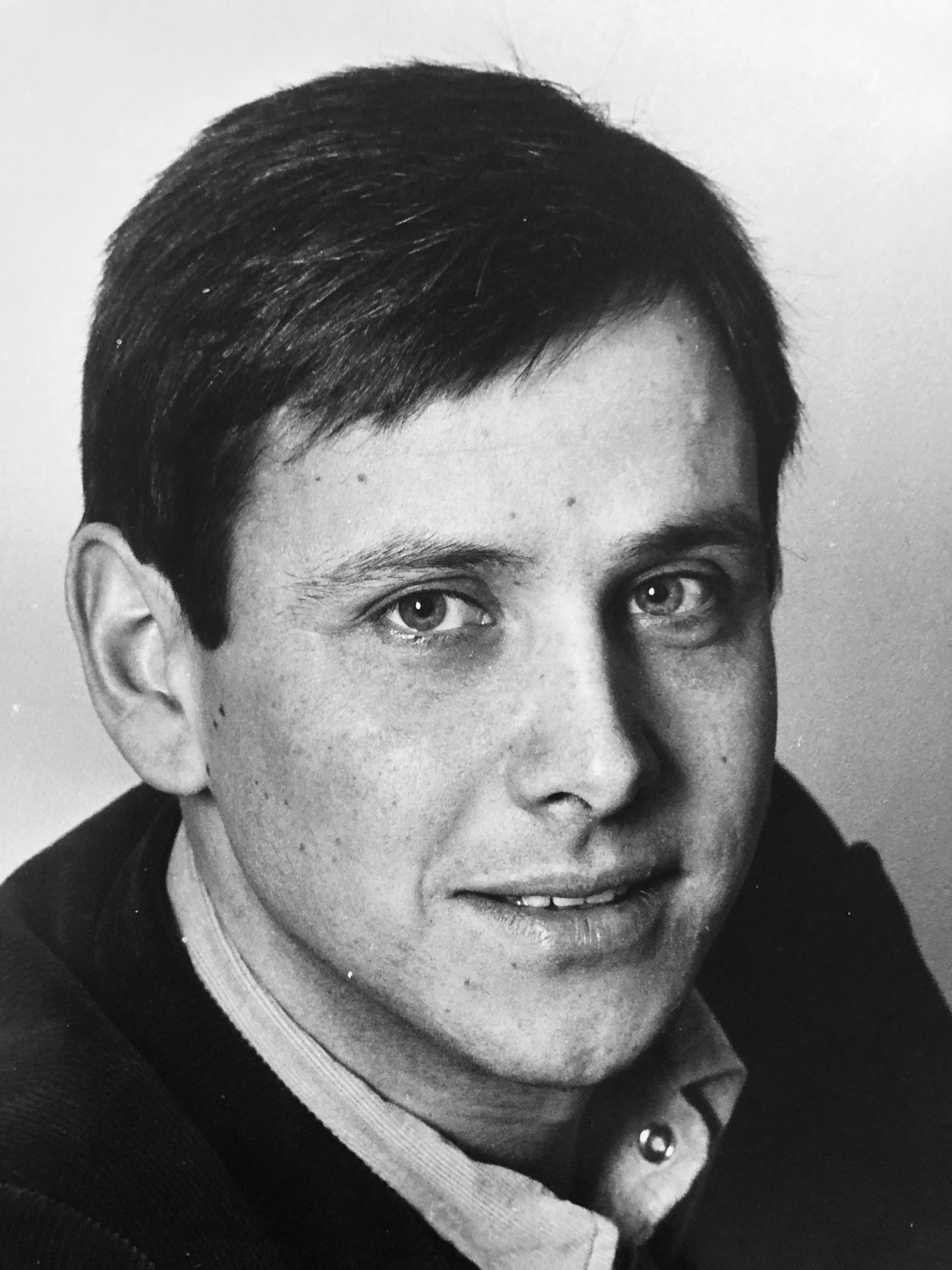
- Born: Peter Ronald Gray; 23 August 1949; Chingford, Essex, England
- Died: 11 December 2004 (aged 55); London, England
- Education: Royal Central School of Speech and Drama
- Occupations: Actor, screenwriter
- Years active: 1971–2004
- Spouse: Victoria Little

Christopher Blake (born Peter Ronald Gray, 23 August 1949 – 11 December 2004) was an English actor and screenwriter. He is perhaps best remembered for starring in the British sitcoms Mixed Blessings (1978–80) and That's My Boy (1981–86).

== Early life ==
He was born Peter Ronald Gray on 23 August 1949, the eldest of three boys, in Chingford, London, England. His father, Charles (known as Harry), was a plasterer and his mother, Elizabeth, a dressmaker and housewife. They went on to have two more sons. The family emigrated to Australia in the late 1950s but returned in 1966 and he attended the Fitzherbert Secondary Modern School, Brighton, Sussex. He then trained at the Central School of Speech and Drama and changed his name to Christopher Blake, because there was another Peter Gray registered with the actors' union, Equity. He chose the surname Blake from the telephone directory.

== Career ==
Blake first came to the attention of television audiences in 1972 when he was cast as Gilbert Blythe in the 1972 BBC adaptation of Anne of Green Gables. He would later reprise the role in 1975 in Anne of Avonlea. Blake later had roles in the LWT serial Love for Lydia (1977), and then a starring role in the ITV sitcom Mixed Blessings (1978–80) for which he also sang the theme tune. Although Blake remained busy as an actor in various stage and television roles, his next truly successful venture was the ITV sitcom That's My Boy (1981–86) in which he played Robert Price, a middle-class doctor who hires a live-in housekeeper (played by Mollie Sugden) who turns out to be his biological mother. After That's My Boy, Blake continued in character parts in episodic television, but never managed to land the more prominent roles that he had enjoyed earlier in his career. He appeared in Brookside as a love interest for Sammy Rogers in 1991.

In 2000, he guest-starred in the Doctor Who audio adventure The Mutant Phase which featured the Daleks.

In later years Christopher Blake turned to screenwriting, writing several episodes of Channel 5's short-lived soap Family Affairs. He wrote two episodes ("Dancing in the Dark" and "Endangered Species") of the ITV crime serial A Touch of Frost with his writing partner Tony Charles.

On the 26 February 1970 edition of Top of the Pops, Blake is seen as an audience member dancing to a Dave Clark Five performance of Everybody Get Together, the official video of the song shot with members of his acting school class.

== Personal life, illness and death ==
He was married twice and had three children from his first marriage; two daughters and a son. A talented all-round cricketer since his youth in Australia, he played the game throughout his life, including for The Lord's Taverners and William Franklyn's team, the Sargentmen, which raised money for the Malcolm Sargent Cancer Fund for Children. One of his other great passions was supporting Arsenal F.C. and he dropped references to Arsenal into scripts whenever the opportunity arose.

In early 2004 after an aggressive and rare form of Non-Hodgkin lymphoma was diagnosed, Blake received treatment at the Royal Marsden Hospital in Surrey. He died on 11 December 2004 in London, England, aged 55. He is buried at the East London Cemetery and Crematorium.

== Television credits ==
- Casualty .... Alan / ... (2 episodes, 1990, 2001)
- Doctors .... Dan Armstrong (1 episode, 2001)
- Birds of a Feather .... David Kane (1 episode, 1997)
- Down to Earth (1995) TV Series .... Chris Fairfax (7 episodes)
- To Be the Best (1992) (TV) .... Sandy
- So Haunt Me (1992) .... Chris Longford (1 episode, 1992)
- Brookside TV Series .... Tim Derby (1991)
- Young Charlie Chaplin (1989) .... Asylum Doctor (2 episodes, 1989)
- That's My Boy (1981–1986) TV Series .... Dr. Robert Price (37 episodes)
- Love's Labour's Lost (1985) (TV) .... Longaville
- Alexa (1982) TV Series .... Paul
- Tales of the Unexpected .... Israeli Officer (1 episode, 1981)
- The Mill on the Floss (1979) TV Miniseries .... Tom Tulliver
- The Lost Boys (1978) TV Series .... George
- Mixed Blessings (1978–80) TV Series .... Thomas Simpson (22 episodes)
- A Ghost Story For Christmas: Stigma (1977) (TV) .... Richard
- Love For Lydia (1977) TV Series .... Richardson
- Anne of Avonlea (1975) TV Series .... Gilbert Blythe
- Warship .... Sg. Lt. Newcombe (1 episode, 1974)
- Death or Glory Boy (1974) (TV) .... David Parker
- Anne of Green Gables (1972) TV Series .... Gilbert Blythe

== Film credits ==
- Child 2 Man (2000) .... Dabdu's Sidekick
- La Passione (1996) .... John MacIlroy
- To be the best (1990) .... Sandy
- Aces High (1976) .... Lieutenant Roberts
- Hennessy (1975) .... Young Soldier
- Because of the Cats (1973) .... Frank Kieft
