= Anne of Avonlea (1975 film) =

1975 British TV miniseries

- Genre: Drama
- Based on: Anne of Avonlea and Anne of the Island by Lucy Maud Montgomery
- Written by: Elaine Morgan
- Directed by: Joan Craft
- Starring: Kim Braden; Barbara Hamilton; Madge Ryan; Christopher Blake; a young Nicholas Lyndhurst
- Country of origin: United Kingdom
- Original language: English
- No. of episodes: 6

Production
- Producer: John McRae
- Running time: 30 minutes
- Production company: BBC

Original release
- Network: BBC1
- Release: 26 January – 2 March 1975

Related
- Anne of Green Gables

Anne of Avonlea is a 1975 British television miniseries, produced by the BBC as a sequel to the 1972 miniseries Anne of Green Gables. It is based on the novels Anne of Avonlea (1909) and Anne of the Island (1915) by Lucy Maud Montgomery, both sequels to Montgomery's 1908 novel Anne of Green Gables. This version was directed by Joan Craft, with Kim Braden in the role of Anne. Both had previously worked on the 1972 adaptation of the preceding novel.

== Plot ==
Anne begins a new job as a teacher at the local school. While working there, she continues to pursue her dream of becoming a published writer by winning a baking soda company's essay contest; fends off several suitors; and returns to Green Gables whenever she can to visit her adoptive mother, Marilla.

== Cast ==
- Kim Braden as Anne Shirley
- Barbara Hamilton as Marilla Cuthbert
- Madge Ryan as Rachel Lynde
- Nicholas Lyndhurst

== Archive status ==
Although the preceding Anne of Green Gables is considered lost, Anne of Avonlea has survived intact and is available on DVD.

== See also ==
- Anne of Green Gables
- Anne of Green Gables: The Sequel (1987 film)
