= Bosom Friends affair =

Controversy concerning Anne of Green Gables

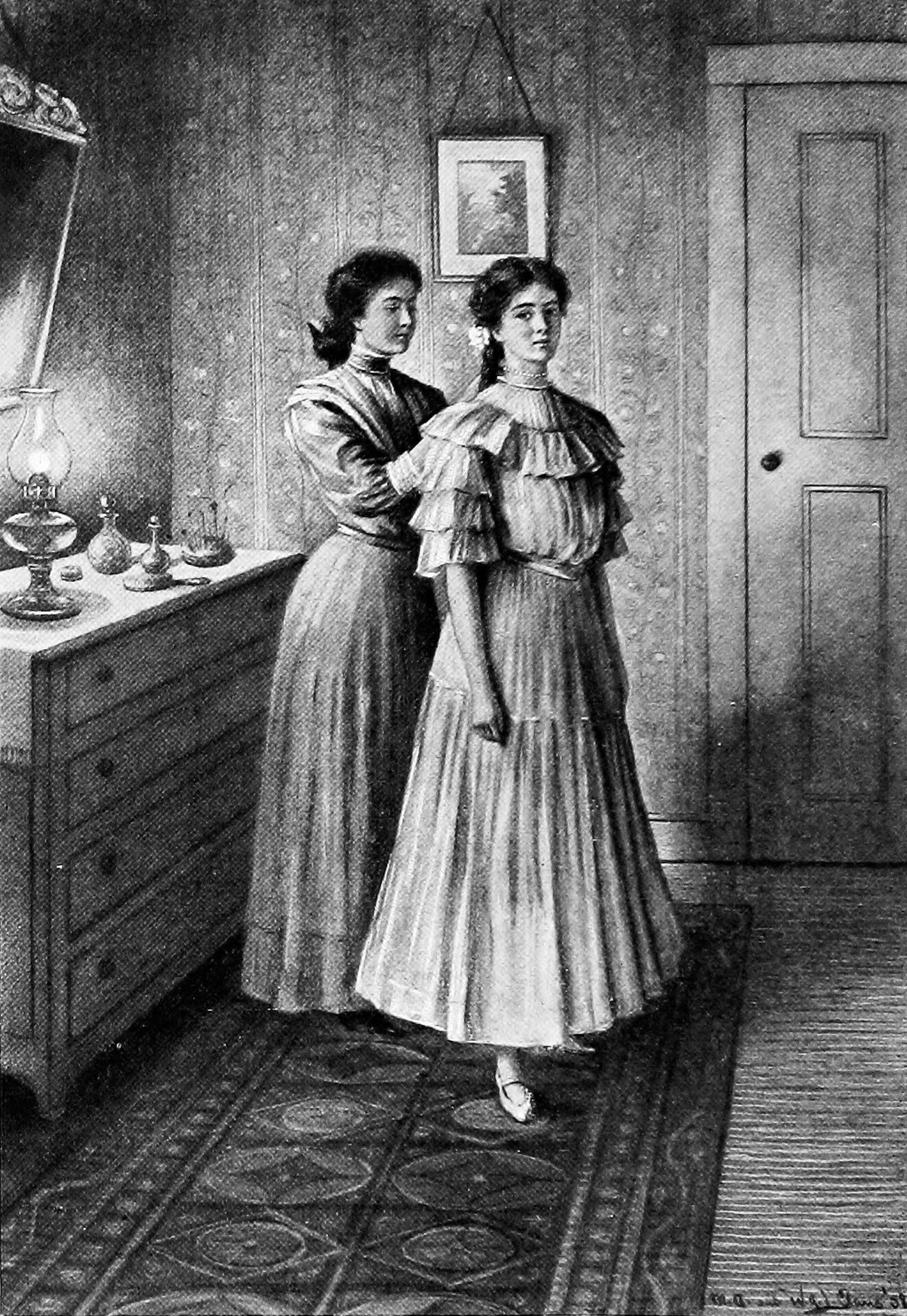
Illustration of Anne Shirley and Diana Barry, from the first edition of Anne of Green Gables (1908).

The "Bosom Friends" affair was an academic and popular controversy sparked when professor Laura Robinson speculated that Anne Shirley of the popular Anne of Green Gables series expressed lesbian desires. The proposal, part of a May 2000 presentation at the Congress of the Social Sciences and Humanities, sparked a media furor.

In a paper entitled "Bosom Friends: Lesbian Desire in L. M. Montgomery's Anne Books", Robinson postulated that, though Anne eventually married a male character, she was more frequently involved in expressing repressed desires for female characters, particularly her "bosom friend" Diana Barry. Reporter Tom Spears of the Ottawa Citizen published a report based on Robinson's paper suggesting that Anne of Green Gables was "full of homo-erotic, sado-masochistic references", and that children had been exposed to said references without the knowledge of their parents in the guise of a wholesome children's story. Based on Spears' report, Robinson was the subject of extensive media criticism. The national newspaper The Globe and Mail presented a front-page report on the story on 31 May speculating on the possible impact of the revelation on the Prince Edward Island tourist industry, a large component of which is "Green Gables" tourism.

The controversy has been compared to the 1998 Tinky-Winky crisis, a debate about the supposed homosexuality of Teletubbies character Tinky-Winky. It has been suggested that the magnitude of the controversy is reflective of Anne Shirley's status as a Canadian national icon. The international response to the affair made it "a cultural phenomenon in its own right". The creation of the cabaret Anne Made Me Gay was partially inspired by the debate.

== See also ==
- Gay agenda
- Homophobia
