= Walter Blythe =

Fictional character

- Born: Walter Cuthbert Blythe; 1893; Glen St. Mary, P.E.I., Canada
- Died: September 1916 (aged 22–23); Courcelette, France
- Known for: Poetry
- Notable work: The Piper
- Awards: Distinguished Conduct Medal

Walter Cuthbert Blythe is a fictional character in Lucy Maud Montgomery's Anne of Green Gables series of novels. He appears as a major character in three books; within the series chronology, they are Anne of Ingleside (book 6, published in 1939), Rainbow Valley (book 7, pub. 1919) and Rilla of Ingleside (book 8, pub. 1921). Walter appears briefly and is also frequently alluded to in the final volume of the series, The Blythes Are Quoted (book 9, completed in 1942 but not published until 2009), in which several of his poems are printed in full and discussed by members of his family.

== Biography ==
Walter Cuthbert Blythe was the second son of Gilbert and Anne Blythe, and was born in 1893 at their home "Ingleside" in Glen St. Mary, Prince Edward Island, Canada. He was named after his maternal grandfather, Walter Shirley; his middle name honours siblings Matthew and Marilla Cuthbert, who had adopted his mother. Walter had six siblings: eldest sister Joyce (who died soon after birth), older brother James Matthew (nicknamed "Jem", named after their neighbour Captain Jim from Anne's House Dreams), younger sisters Anne and Diana (named for their mother, Anne, and their mother's adolescent "bosom friend", Diana Barry, and known as "Nan" and "Di", respectively), younger brother Shirley (the family name of his mother); and youngest sister Bertha Marilla (from her maternal grandmother's first name and the late Marilla Cuthbert), also known as "Rilla".

Even as a child, Walter loved poetry and aspired to one day become a famous poet. In this, he took after his mother, who also dreamed of being a writer, and who did make at least one professional sale. While of a more sensitive nature than some of his school friends, and occasionally branded a "milksop", Walter was generally respected by his school mates for his intelligence and compassion. He also won some admiration after winning a fight with a school bully (Dan Reese) who had insulted his mother and Faith Meredith (second oldest of the Meredith clan).

Walter and his siblings (along with the Meredith children who lived in the neighbouring house) spent many hours playing in a hollow called Rainbow Valley, which was located near Ingleside. It was there that Walter had a prophetic vision of World War I, daydreaming of (and later insisting that he actually saw) a Piper who used the call of his pipe to sweep the children away. The idea of the piper calling the boys to war is introduced in Chapter 8 of Rainbow Valley:

"Some day," said Walter dreamily, looking afar into the sky, "the Pied Piper will come over the hill up there and down Rainbow Valley, piping merrily and sweetly. And I will follow him — follow him down to the shore — down to the sea — away from you all. I don't think I'll want to go — Jem will want to go — it will be such an adventure — but I won't. Only I'll HAVE to — the music will call and call and call me until I MUST follow."

Unbeknownst to him, Walter's vision would prove entirely accurate, as he would later fight and die in one of the world's most terrible wars.

Like most of his siblings, Walter attended Queen's College in nearby Charlottetown, which offered the equivalent to a high school education. He later survived a serious bout with typhoid that left him in a weakened state; after he recovered, he spent two years as a school teacher in the village of Lowbridge, P.E.I. He resigned from this position in the spring of 1914, with the intention of pursuing a bachelor's degree at Redmond College in Kingsport, Nova Scotia.

When war was declared in August, 1914, Walter's older brother Jem immediately volunteered to become a member of the Canadian army. However, even though he was of age, Walter did not do so, ostensibly over concerns that he was still in a weakened state from having had typhoid. Instead, he enrolled at Redmond, and spent an academic year there in 1914/15. While there, Walter increasingly felt pressure from all sides to enroll in the army, and was anonymously sent a white feather (a symbol of cowardice) by someone at the college. Eventually, in the summer of 1915, Walter felt he was completely over the effects of typhoid, and succumbed to the Piper's call, volunteering for duty. Though his status as a college man may have made it possible for him to enroll as an officer, he, like his college-educated brother Jem, joined as a regular serviceman and was assigned the rank of private.

After training in Canada, and returning to Ingleside for one last visit in July 1915, Walter was shipped to France and fought in the trenches there. In the spring of 1916, at great risk to himself, he carried a wounded fellow soldier out of No Man's Land and back to safety; for this action, he was awarded the Distinguished Conduct Medal, the second-highest honour awarded to Canadian soldiers at the time.

Around the same time, while in the trenches, Walter wrote the poem for which he would become famous. Entitled "The Piper", and drawing in part upon his prophetic vision of World War I, Walter wrote his younger sister Rilla that "I didn't feel as if I were writing it – something seemed to use me as an instrument." Walter sent the poem to the London Spectator, and events blossomed from there:

"The poem was a short, poignant little thing. In a month it had carried Walter's name to every corner of the globe. Everywhere it was copied -- in metropolitan dailies and little village weeklies, in profound reviews and "agony columns," in Red Cross appeals and Government recruiting propaganda. Mothers and sisters wept over it, young lads thrilled to it, the whole great heart of humanity caught it up as an epitome of all the pain and hope and pity and purpose of the mighty conflict, crystallized in three brief immortal verses. A Canadian lad in the Flanders trenches had written the one great poem of the war. "The Piper," by Pte. Walter Blythe, was a classic from its first printing."

Only a few months after the poem was published, Walter died at the Battle of Courcelette, in September 1916. The night before his death, he wrote his sister Rilla that he had another vision of The Piper, whom he would be forced to follow the next day. Again, his vision was accurate, as Walter went into battle the following morning and was killed by a bullet during the charge, dying instantly.

Walter's death was "foreshadowed" in Chapter 41 of Anne of Ingleside, published 18 years after the book in which he dies. Set in the early 1900s, when Walter was still a child, near the very end of the book, his mother Anne looks in on him as he is sleeping:

"Walter was smiling in his sleep as someone who knew a charming secret. The moon was shining on his pillow through the bars of the leaded window... casting the shadow of a clearly defined cross on the wall above his head. In long years after, Anne was to remember that and wonder if it were an omen of Courcelette... of a cross-marked grave "somewhere in France." "

== "The Piper" ==
The circumstances surrounding the composition of Walter's poem "The Piper", as well as the poem's message, its almost instant recognition as a classic, and the tragic wartime demise of its author, is very similar to the story of the real-life poem "In Flanders Fields" by Canadian John McCrae. Though never fully written out in Rilla of Ingleside, "The Piper" is implied to mimic "In Flanders Fields" in content and form.

L.M. Montgomery eventually wrote a poem called "The Piper"; it was the last poem she completed. Submitted to the Canadian magazine Saturday Night in April, 1942, "The Piper" ran on May 2, 1942, less than two weeks after Montgomery's death. The piece included a brief explanatory note from Montgomery, stating that people had been asking for copies of the poem for years (Rilla of Ingleside, in which the poem was discussed, was originally published in 1921), but that the poem did not exist at the time the book was published. Instead, the poem was written many years later about another war: World War II.

"One day the Piper came down the Glen…

Sweet and long and low played he!

The children followed from door to door,

No matter how those who loved might implore,

So willing the song of his melody

As the song of a woodland rill.

Someday the Piper will come again

To pipe to the sons of the maple tree!

You and I will follow from door to door,

Many of us will come back no more…

What matter that if freedom still

Be the crown of each native hill?"

Although the general tenor of the actual published poem is similar to what is described in Rilla of Ingleside, this version of '"The Piper" differs in some respects from Montgomery's earlier description of Walter's poem. Notably, Montgomery's version has two stanzas, not three, and makes no mention of "keeping faith" as was said to be a central portion of Walter's poem.

Montgomery included the poem as a sort of preface to The Blythes Are Quoted, the intended ninth book in the Anne series. This book was submitted to her publishers on the day of her death (April 24, 1942), but was not issued in its full form until 2009. A severely cut version of the book, The Road to Yesterday, was issued in 1974; "The Piper" was amongst the nearly 100 pages of material that was cut. The last book of the series is Rilla of Ingleside which is the book about the youngest of the Blythe children Rilla. This is the book in which Walter dies at war.
