= B-And-B =

Television series

- Genre: Sitcom
- Created by: Michael Pertwee
- Starring: Bernard Braden; Barbara Kelly; Kim Braden; Mark Griffith
- Country of origin: United Kingdom
- No. of episodes: 8

Production
- Running time: 30 minutes

Original release
- Network: BBC1
- Release: 7 June – 18 December 1968

B-And-B is a British television sitcom starring Bernard Braden, his wife Barbara Kelly and their daughter Kim Braden. It was written by Michael Pertwee, and aired for a pilot and one series in 1968.

== Cast ==
- Bernard Braden – Bernie
- Barbara Kelly – Barbara
- Kim Braden – Sally
- Mark Griffith – Johnny
- Pauline Collins – Chantal (pilot)

== Plot ==
This domestic sitcom stars married couple Bernard Braden and Barbara Kelly as a married couple who both have successful showbusiness careers, and clearly there was an ounce of realism in the programme. In the pilot, Bernie falls for Chantal, their French au pair. Bernie thinks his wife is having an affair, they both think their children are taking drugs and in the final episode the couple contemplate divorce.

== Episodes ==
=== Pilot (1968) ===
- Pilot (7 June 1968) (part of Comedy Playhouse)

=== Series One (1968) ===
1. "No Son of Mine" (6 November 1968)
2. "In Times of Crisis" (13 November 1968)
3. "Baby Talk" (20 November 1968)
4. "Roger" (27 November 1968)
5. "Come to the Aid of the Party" (4 December 1968)
6. "Pryde and Prejudice" (11 December 1968)
7. "Anniversary Schmaltz" (18 December 1968)
