= John McRae =

John McRae may refer to:

- John J. McRae, American politician in Mississippi
- John Rodney McRae, American murderer and suspected serial killer
- John Duncan McRae, member of the Legislative Assembly of British Columbia, 1949–1952
- John McRae (British Columbia politician), member of the Legislative Assembly of British Columbia, 1920–1924
- John McRae (bowls)

== See also ==
- John McCrae, Canadian poet, physician, author, artist and soldier
- John McCrea (disambiguation)
- John MacRae (disambiguation)
