= Jet Storm =

1959 British film by Cy Endfield

- Lobby card
- Directed by: Cy Endfield
- Written by: Cy Endfield; Sigmund Miller
- Produced by: Steven Pallos
- Starring: Richard Attenborough; Stanley Baker; Hermione Baddeley; Bernard Braden
- Cinematography: Jack Hildyard
- Edited by: Oswald Hafenrichter
- Music by: Thomas Rajna
- Production company: Pendennis Pictures
- Distributed by: United Producers Releasing Organization
- Release date: 16 September 1959 (UK)
- Running time: 88 minutes
- Country: United Kingdom
- Language: English

Jet Storm (also known as Jet Stream or Killing Urge) is a 1959 British thriller film directed and co-written by Cy Endfield. Richard Attenborough stars with Stanley Baker, Hermione Baddeley and Diane Cilento. The film is a precursor to the later aviation disaster film genre such as Airport (1970).

== Plot ==
Ernest Tilley, a former scientist who lost his daughter two years earlier in a hit-and-run accident, tracks down James Brock, the man he believes is responsible for the accident and boards the same airliner on a transatlantic flight, flying from London to New York.

Tilley has hidden a bomb on board and threatens to blow it up in an act of vengeance, not only killing Brock but also all passengers and crew. The passengers include his second wife, Carol, whom he met after his daughter's death, and the subsequent breakdown of his first marriage.

When Captain Bardow and the passengers realise that he is serious, and they cannot find the bomb (which Tilley had attached to the underside of the airliner's left wing), they begin to panic. Some want to pressure him into revealing the location of the bomb, while others such as Doctor Bergstein try to reason with the now silent Tilley. Mulliner, a terrified passenger, attempts to kill Brock to stop Tilley from setting off the bomb.

Acting out of fear, Brock is killed when he smashes a window and is blown out of the airliner. Tilley comes to his senses when a young boy passenger, Jeremy Tracer, soothes him. He then disconnects the remote control for the bomb, and commits suicide by poison. As the airliner approaches New York, the passengers realise that they will survive.

== Cast ==
- Richard Attenborough as Ernest Tilley
- Stanley Baker as Capt. Bardow
- Hermione Baddeley as Mrs Satterly
- Bernard Braden as Otis Randolf
- Diane Cilento as Angelica Como
- Barbara Kelly as Edwina Randolf
- David Kossoff as Dr Bergstein
- Virginia Maskell as Pam Leyton
- Harry Secombe as Binky Meadows
- Elizabeth Sellars as Inez Barrington
- Dame Sybil Thorndike as Emma Morgan
- Mai Zetterling as Carol Tilley
- Patrick Allen as Mulliner
- Paul Carpenter as George Towers
- Megs Jenkins as Rose Brock
- Jocelyn Lane as Clara Forrester
- Cec Linder as Col Coe
- Neil McCallum as "Gil" Gilbert
- Lana Morris as Jane Tracer
- George Rose as James Brock
- Peter Bayliss as Bentley
- John Crewdson as Whitman
- Paul Eddington as Victor Tracer
- Glyn Houston as Michaels
- Peter Illing as Gelderen
- Irene Prador as Sophia Gelderen
- Marty Wilde as Billy Forrester
- Jeremy Judge as Jeremy Tracer
- George Murcell as Saunders
- Alun Owen as Green

== Production ==
The type of aircraft depicted is a Soviet-built Tupolev Tu-104. Although the airline and its crew are clearly British, having departed from London and a BEA Vickers Viscount is also seen, the aircraft shown at the beginning is sporting the Soviet Union's flag on the tail. This twin-jet airliner was only used by airlines in the Soviet bloc. A medium-range airliner, the Tu-104 also could not have been used on transatlantic routes. (Note: The Tupolev Tu-104 is a single hull airliner; it did not have a lower deck as depicted in the film.)

It was the fourth collaboration between Baker and Cy Endfield.

== Reception ==
In the Time Out review, John Pym saw Jet Storm as, "A British prototype for the Airport disaster movies of the '60s and '70s." He went on to note, "... like its later supersonic counterparts, Endfield's film is naive and contrived, but not without interest as the alarmed passengers soon divide into groups: reactionary (advocating torture) and liberal (patience and persuasion)."

The TV Guide critic wrote, "... thanks to an outstanding cast, this air-disaster film manages to limp to a landing with its 'thriller' status intact." The Radio Times applauded "... a star turn for Attenborough, who brings a convincing complexity to the role of bomber and bereft father."

== Bibliography ==
- Pym, John, ed. "Jet Storm." Time Out Film Guide. London: Time Out Guides Limited, 2004. ISBN 978-0-14101-354-1.
