= The Man with Two Lives =

1942 film by Phil Rosen

Man with Two Lives
- Directed by: Phil Rosen
- Written by: Joseph Hoffman
- Produced by: A.W. Hackel (producer)
- Starring: See below
- Cinematography: Harry Neumann
- Music by: Frank Sanucci
- Distributed by: Monogram Pictures
- Release date: 1942
- Running time: 65 minutes
- Country: United States
- Language: English

Man with Two Lives is a 1942 American film directed by Phil Rosen and written by Joseph Hoffman.

== Plot ==
The story is of a man who is brought back from the dead and whose body is hijacked by the soul of an executed gangster, consequently making the deceased man a high-ranking criminal.

At the beginning of the story, the happy couple Phillip Bennett and Louise Hammond are engaged to be married. A major bump on their planned road to the future emerges when sadly Phillip is killed in a traffic accident as they are driving back from their engagement party.

The dubious Dr. Clarke, who apparently is known for being able to revive deceased animals, is called on for the purpose of bringing Phillip back to life. By midnight on that very same night as Phillip's demise, the infamous criminal Panino is to receive his capital punishment for his crimes: execution via electrocution.

Just minutes before midnight Dr. Clarke performs his resuscitation operation and it is a successful one, but when Panino dies moments later his soul enters Phillip's body. The soul change goes unnoticed however, and Phillip's body is brought home to his hopeful wife to be. At first it appears Phillip suffers from severe amnesia, and he is uncapable of recognizing any of the persons previously known to him, which is of course an unpleasant surprise.

Phillip instantly starts roaming Panino's old hoods, and it doesn't take long before he once again is supreme commander of his old gang, running the business as usual, but in the shape of Phillip. The people around Phillip, including his father Hobart Bennet is worried by the development and this new personality of Phillip's. They become even more worried when they start noticing that he is more and more absent from his home. Soon a crime wave hits the city and there is an outbreak of gang wars, throwing the city into chaos as gang members are killed on every side. Accompanied by Dr. Clarke, Phillip's father Hobart visits the gang's headquarters and meets with the gangsters, to tell them who Panino/Phillip really is. They ask the gang members about Phillip's relation to the gang and its business, and the gang members find out that Phillip, a respectable citizen, is the son of Hobart Bennet. Phillip/Panino finds out about this and feels threatened by the fact that some of the gang members know about his "secret identity". He murders all of the potentially dangerous gang members, but fails to kill one person, a brother to one of the murdered gang members, who knows his secret.

This remaining man becomes the key to catching Panino/Phillip and stop him from going through with his planned robbery. He tips the police of Panino/Phillip's plans and a trap is laid to catch the felon, but he escapes and decides to take revenge on the detective in charge of hunting him down. He ends up killing the detective, but is in turn killed by Dr. Clarke.

== Cast ==
- Edward Norris as Philip Bennett
- Marlo Dwyer as Helen Lengel
- Eleanor Lawson as Louise Hammond
- Frederick Burton as Hobart Bennett
- Addison Richards as Lt. Detective George Bradley
- Edward Keane as Dr. Richard Clark
- Hugh Sothern as Prof. Toller
- Tom Seidel as Reginald "Reg" Bennett
- Elliott Sullivan as Eric
- Anthony Warde as Hugo
- Ernie Adams as Gimpy
- Kenne Duncan as Jess Fowler
- George Dobbs as Tim Martin
- Lois Landon as Aunt Margaret
- Frances Richards as Nurse
- Jack Buckley as Mitch Larsen
- Jack Ingram as Ed. Sporady
- George Kirby as The Bennett Butler
