= John MacRae =

John MacRae may refer to:

- John Chester MacRae (1912–1997), Canadian school teacher, soldier and Canadian Member of Parliament from New Brunswick
- John David MacRae (1876–1967), Canadian member of parliament from Ontario
- John MacRae-Gilstrap (1861–1937), British army officer and restorer of Eilean Donan Castle
- John Macrae (priest), dean of Brechin, 1936–1947
- John Macrae (diplomat) (1932–2025), British diplomat

== See also ==
- John Mecray (1937–2017), American realist artist specialising in Marine Art
- John J. McRae (1815–1868), governor of Mississippi
- John McCrae (1872–1918), Canadian poet and surgeon, author of the war poem "In Flanders Fields"
- John McCrea (disambiguation)
