= Elliott Sullivan =

American actor

- Born: July 4, 1907; San Antonio, Texas, U.S.
- Died: June 2, 1974 (aged 66); Los Angeles, California, U.S.
- Occupation: Actor
- Spouse: Norma
- Children: 2

Elliott Sullivan (July 4, 1907 – June 2, 1974) was an American actor.

Sullivan was born in San Antonio, Texas, the son of Rabbi Solomon Solomon.

He got his first Broadway walk‐on role in 1929 in Morris Gest's presentation of “The Passion Play”. Broadway plays in which Sullivan appeared included Hamlet (1961), The Octoroon (1961), The Plough and the Stars (1960), She Stoops to Conquer (1960), Henry IV, Part II (1960), Henry IV, Part I (1960), Peer Gynt (1960), Lysistrata (1959), The Great God Brown (1959), The Power and the Glory (1958), Compulsion (1957), Brigadoon (1957), Small War on Murray Hill (1957), Brigadoon (1947), Skydrift (1945), Winged Victory (1943), Lysistrata (1930), and Red Rust (1929).

Sullivan appeared in numerous films.

In 1956, Sullivan was indicted for contempt of Congress after he appeared as an unfriendly witness before the House Un-American Activities Committee. He was acquitted of that charge in 1961.

Sullivan moved to London in 1962, joined British Actors Equity, and acted in productions in Europe.

Sullivan died on June 2, 1974, in Los Angeles, California at age 66.

== Selected filmography ==
- Fury Below (1936) - Coal Miner
- San Quentin (1937) - Convict (uncredited)
- Kid Galahad (1937) - Photographer in Nightclub (uncredited)
- They Won't Forget (1937) - Luther Clay
- Mr. Dodd Takes the Air (1937) - Taxi Driver (uncredited)
- Love Is on the Air (1937) - First Henchman (uncredited)
- Alcatraz Island (1937) - First Convict in Cell (uncredited)
- Submarine D-1 (1937) - Man from S-62 (uncredited)
- Missing Witnesses (1937) - 2nd Aviator (uncredited)
- Wells Fargo (1937) - Minor Role (uncredited)
- A Slight Case of Murder (1938) - Beer Salesman (uncredited)
- Over the Wall (1938) - Chic Metzer - Henchman (uncredited)
- Accidents Will Happen (1938) - Burley Thorne
- Gangs of New York (1938) - Hopkins
- Racket Busters (1938) - Charlie Smith
- The Sisters (1938) - Second Sailor (uncredited)
- Angels with Dirty Faces (1938) - Cop (uncredited)
- Next Time I Marry (1938) - Red
- Devil's Island (1939) - Gate Guard (uncredited)
- King of the Underworld (1939) - Mugsy
- The Great Man Votes (1939) - Cement Man (uncredited)
- They Made Me a Criminal (1939) - Mel - Hoodlum Stealing $50 (uncredited)
- Nancy Drew... Reporter (1939) - Pedestrian (uncredited)
- The Oklahoma Kid (1939) - McCord's Henchman (uncredited)
- The Man Who Dared (1939) - Slug (uncredited)
- Bachelor Mother (1939) - Bouncer at 'The Pink Slipper' (uncredited)
- They All Come Out (1939) - Sheriff (uncredited)
- Indianapolis Speedway (1939) - Jimmy, Ted's Mechanic (uncredited)
- Waterfront (1939) - Committee Man (uncredited)
- Each Dawn I Die (1939) - Convict (uncredited)
- The Spellbinder (1939) - Harry 'Ice Box' Swinnerty
- Smashing the Money Ring (1939) - Danny Galloway
- On Dress Parade (1939) - Leader at Position H4 (uncredited)
- The Roaring Twenties (1939) - Eddie's Cellmate (uncredited)
- That's Right—You're Wrong (1939) - Hood (uncredited)
- Brother Rat and a Baby (1940) - Garage Man with Invoice (uncredited)
- The Saint's Double Trouble (1940) - Monk
- An Angel from Texas (1940) - Garvey - Davis Henchman (uncredited)
- The Man Who Talked Too Much (1940) - Bill
- Millionaires in Prison (1940) - Tony Brody
- Calling All Husbands (1940) - Chunky
- City for Conquest (1940) - Photographer (uncredited)
- Behind the News (1940) - Thug (uncredited)
- Where Did You Get That Girl? (1941) - Cab Driver (uncredited)
- Flight from Destiny (1941) - Cab Driver #2 (uncredited)
- Father's Son (1941) - Gus' Pal (uncredited)
- Andy Hardy's Private Secretary (1941) - Service Station Man #2 (uncredited)
- Knockout (1941) - East Side Pug (uncredited)
- Sis Hopkins (1941) - Attendant (uncredited)
- Ziegfeld Girl (1941) - Second Truck Driver (uncredited)
- The People vs. Dr. Kildare (1941) - Taxi Driver at Mike's (uncredited)
- Blossoms in the Dust (1941) - Note Collector (uncredited)
- Manpower (1941) - Lineman at Cafe Counter (uncredited)
- Navy Blues (1941) - Shore Patrolman #2 (uncredited)
- Honky Tonk (1941) - Candy's Man (uncredited)
- Blues in the Night (1941) - Waiter #2 at The Jungle (uncredited)
- Unholy Partners (1941) - Eddie - in Miami (uncredited)
- Johnny Eager (1941) - Ed Nolan (uncredited)
- Mr. District Attorney (1941) - Detective (uncredited)
- Wild Bill Hickok Rides (1942) - Bart Hanna (Credits) / Mr. Harris
- A Tragedy at Midnight (1942) - Cop (uncredited)
- The Man with Two Lives (1942) - Eric
- In This Our Life (1942) - Worker (uncredited)
- This Gun for Hire (1942) - Officer Glennon (uncredited)
- Yankee Doodle Dandy (1942) - Army Recruiter Examiner (uncredited)
- Escape from Crime (1942) - Prison Clerk with Prison Number (uncredited)
- You Can't Escape Forever (1942) - Mooch - Greer's Henchman (uncredited)
- Lucky Jordan (1942) - 1st Soldier (uncredited)
- G-Men vs. the Black Dragon (1943, Serial) - Turner (uncredited)
- Calaboose (1943) - Henchman (uncredited)
- Taxi, Mister (1943) - Man Slapped Around by Louie (uncredited)
- A Gentle Gangster (1943) - Lefty
- Action in the North Atlantic (1943) - Hennessy (uncredited)
- Crime Doctor (1943) - Detective with Hat (uncredited)
- Whistling in Brooklyn (1943) - Henchman Dutch (uncredited)
- The Story of Dr. Wassell (1944) - Naval Officer (uncredited)
- The Last Ride (1944) - Tire Expert (uncredited)
- An American Romance (1944) - Auto Workers' Spokesman (uncredited)
- The Naked City (1948) - Wrestlers' Trainer (uncredited)
- The Lady Gambles (1949) - Barky
- Guilty Bystander (1950) - Stitch
- So Young So Bad (1950) - Guard (uncredited)
- Taxi (1953) - Delivery Man (uncredited)
- Crowded Paradise (1956)
- The Joker Is Wild (1957) - Nightclub Patron (uncredited)
- Frozen Flashes (1967) - US General
- The Dirty Dozen (1967) - Army officer at briefing (uncredited)
- Ice Station Zebra (1968) - Bartender (uncredited)
- The Sergeant (1968) - Pop Henneken
- The Desperados (1969) - Jennison
- On Her Majesty's Secret Service (1969) - American Guest (uncredited)
- Tropic of Cancer (1970) - Peckover
- The Revolutionary (1970)
- Anne of Green Gables (1972) - Matthew Cuthbert
- Fear Is the Key (1972) - Judge Mollison
- The Great Gatsby (1974) - Wilson's Friend
- The Spikes Gang (1974) - Billy
- Vampyres (1974) - American Man
