= John McCrea =

John McCrea may refer to:

- John McCrea (actor) (born 1992), British actor and singer
- John McCrea (musician) (born 1964), lead singer of the band Cake
- John Frederick McCrea (1854–1894), South African Victoria Cross recipient
- John L. McCrea (1891–1990), American naval officer
- John McCrea (Royal Navy officer) (1829–1883), British admiral
- John McCrea (comics) (born 1966), Northern Irish comic book artist

== See also ==
- John McCrae (1872–1918), Canadian poet, physician, author, artist and soldier
- John Mecray (1937–2017), American realist painter
- John Macrae (disambiguation)
