= Kim Braden =

British actress

- Born: November 21, 1948 (age 77); London, England
- Occupation: Actress
- Years active: 1960–1994
- Spouse: David Carson (m. 1981)
- Children: 2
- Parent(s): Bernard Braden; Barbara Kelly

Kim Braden (born 21 November 1948) is a British-born U.S.-based former actress.

== Biography ==
Braden is a daughter of the actor and broadcaster Bernard Braden and the actress Barbara Kelly, both originally from Canada.

Braden came to prominence in the title role of the popular BBC television series Anne of Green Gables (1972), although this adaptation was lost after the master videotapes were wiped and it is unknown if any copies exist. She reprised her role in the 1975 sequel, Anne of Avonlea, which has survived in the BBC's archive.

In 1981, Braden married David Carson. They have two children.

In 1988, Braden was nominated for a Gemini Award (Best Performance by a Lead Actress in a Single Dramatic Program or Mini-Series) for her role in Spearfield's Daughter.

== Acting credits ==
- The Rolling Stones (1960) TV Series
- B-And-B (1968) TV Series
- Wolfshead: The Legend of Robin Hood (1969)... as Alice
- Trog (1970)... as Anne Brockton
- Anne of Green Gables (1972) TV Series... as Anne Shirley
- That'll Be the Day (1973)... as Charlotte
- Z-Cars - ep. "The Cinder Path" (1973) TV Series ... as Jill
- Anne of Avonlea (1975) TV Mini-Series... as Anne Shirley
- Billyboy (1979)
- Nobody's Perfect (1980) TV Series... as Liz Parker
- To Serve Them All My Days (1980) TV Series ... as Julia Darbyshire
- Have I Got You ... Where You Want Me? (1981)... as Valerie
- Spearfield's Daughter (1986) TV Mini-Series... as Cleo Spearfield
- Alien Nation - eps. "Green Eyes" & "Gimme, Gimme" (1990) TV Series... as Marilyn Houston
- Star Trek: The Next Generation - ep. "The Loss" (1990) TV Series... as Ensign Janet Brooks
- Perry Mason: The Case of the Glass Coffin (1991) TV movie... as Judy Katz
- Murder, She Wrote - ep. "Tinker, Tailor, Liar, Thief" (1992) TV Series... as Daisy Collins
- Silent Cries (1993) ... as Mrs. Webber
- Star Trek Generations (1994) ... as Elise Picard

== Awards and nominations ==
Year	Award	Category	Title of work	Result
1988	Gemini Award	Best Performance by a Lead Actress in a Single Dramatic Program or Mini-Series	Spearfield's Daughter	Nominated
