= Museum of Yachting =

Non-profit organization and museum in Newport, Rhode Island, U.S.

Coordinates: 41.480962°N 71.314974°W

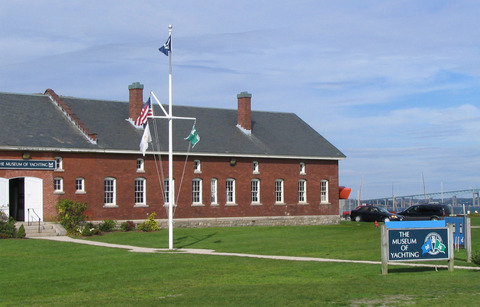
Museum of Yachting, Newport, RI

The Museum of Yachting was a not-for-profit organization in Newport, Rhode Island which worked to preserve the culture and heritage of yachting.

== History ==
The Museum was founded in 1979 by John Mecray and a small group of friends and was first housed at Fort Adams. In 2007, the International Yacht Restoration School acquired the museum and, in 2008, relocated its collection to the Edward W. Kane and James Gubelmann Library located in the restored John Mecray Aquidneck Mill Building.

== Exhibits ==
The Museum was home to two permanent exhibits: The America’s Cup – The Newport Years, and Coronet: The Long Life and Revival of an Historic American Schooner Yacht, the story of Coronet. It was also home to the now defunct American Sailboat Hall of Fame which honored sailboats built-in the United States and the Single-Handed Sailors' Hall of Fame which honored achievements of outstanding solo sailors throughout the world. This hall of fame has been succeeded by the National Sailing Hall of Fame at the Sailing Museum, also in Newport, Rhode Island; and the America's Cup Hall of Fame, located in Bristol, Rhode Island.

== Classic Yacht Regatta ==
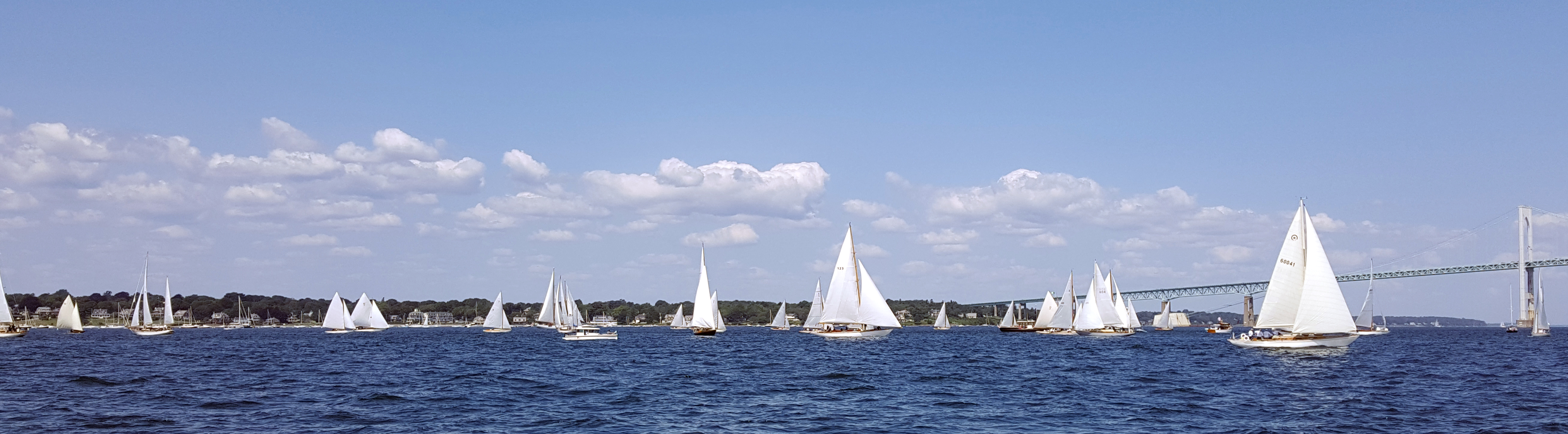
Newport RI Classic Yacht Regatta by Don Ramey Logan

Starting in 1980, the Museum organized and hosted the annual Classic Yacht Regatta to raise awareness of and showcase vintage sailing yachts. The IYRS School of Technology & Trades has since taken over organizational duties of the Regatta.
