= Spearfield's Daughter (miniseries) =

- Written by: Jon Cleary
- Directed by: Gilbert M. Shilton
- Starring: Kim Braden; Christopher Plummer; Nancy Marchand; Chris Wiggins
- Music by: Irwin Fisch
- Countries of origin: Canada; Australia
- Original language: English

Production
- Producers: Pieter Kroonenburg; David J. Patterson; Altman E. Robert
- Cinematography: Mark Irwin; John R. McLean
- Editor: Debra Karen
- Running time: 284 minutes
- Production companies: 20th Century Fox Television; Seven Network; Forum Films

Original release
- Network: Global Television Network; Seven Network
- Release: May 25 – May 27, 1986

Spearfield's Daughter is an Australian-Canadian television miniseries, directed by Gilbert Shilton and released in 1986. Adapted from Jon Cleary's 1982 novel Spearfield's Daughter, the series stars Kim Braden as Cleo Spearfield, a woman attempting to make a name for herself as a journalist in the still largely-sexist world of media.

The cast also includes Chris Wiggins as Cleo's father Sylvester, Christopher Plummer as British aristocrat Lord Jack Cruze, and Nancy Marchand as newspaper publisher Claudine Roux, as well as Steve Railsback, Céline Lomez, Bronwen Mantel, John Novak, Ross Petty, Michael Sinelnikoff, Jill Frappier, Anthony Sherwood, Richard Carter, Walter Massey, Ron Lea, Jack Creley, Jack Duffy, Vlasta Vrána and Stephanie Morgenstern in supporting roles.

The series was broadcast by Global Television Network in Canada in May 1986, and by Seven Network in Australia in August.

== Awards ==
Award	Date of ceremony	Category	Recipient(s)	Result	Ref(s)
Gemini Awards	December 4, 1986	Best Dramatic Miniseries	David Patterson	Nominated	
Gemini Awards	December 4, 1986	Best Performance by a Lead Actress in a Single Dramatic Program or Mini-Series	Kim Braden	Nominated	
