= Mixed Blessings (British TV series) =

British sitcom

- Genre: Sitcom
- Created by: Sid Green
- Starring: Christopher Blake; Muriel Odunton; Joan Sanderson
- Country of origin: United Kingdom
- Original language: English
- No. of series: 3
- No. of episodes: 23

Production
- Running time: 30 minutes
- Production company: London Weekend Television

Original release
- Network: ITV
- Release: 3 March 1978 – 7 June 1980

Mixed Blessings is a British sitcom starring Christopher Blake and Muriel Odunton that aired on ITV from 3 March 1978 to 7 June 1980. It was created by comedy writer Sid Green and produced for the ITV network by LWT.

== Premise and reception ==
The show starred Christopher Blake (later of That's My Boy fame) and Muriel Odunton as newlyweds Thomas Simpson, who was white, and Susan Lambert, who was black. Most plots revolved around both families' disapproval of their inter-racial marriage.

According to a review on the BFI screenonline website, the series "was, superficially, more progressive" than earlier sitcoms centred on 'race' such as Curry and Chips (1969), Love Thy Neighbour (1972–76) and Mind Your Language (1977–79). While "the two main characters were sympathetically played... the series [itself] was critically undermined by presenting their relationship as a problem". The review also asserted: "While its set-up points to its integrationist intentions, one only has to look at the title to note the writer's own ambiguous feelings".

== Cast ==
- Christopher Blake – Thomas Simpson
- Muriel Odunton – Susan Lambert
- George Waring – Edward Simpson
- Sylvia Kay – Annie Simpson
- Stefan Kalipha – William Lambert
- Pauline Delaney – Mrs Beasley
- Carmen Munroe – Matilda Lambert
- Joan Sanderson – Aunt Dorothy
- Gregory Munroe – Winston Lambert

=== Guest cast ===
- John Abbott – Clerk of the Court
- Ernest Clark – Mr Huntley
- Luan Peters – Deirdre
- Alma Yang Tuk – Rosemary
- Jumoke Debayo – L'ena

== Episodes ==
=== Series 1 (1978) ===
- "Welcome to the Family" (3 March 1978)
- "Your Place Or Mine?" (10 March 1978)
- "You Haven't Got Much, Have You?" (17 March 1978)
- "Jobs for the Boys" (24 March 1978)
- "Happy Birthday, Dear Fathers" (31 March 1978)
- "We're Only Trying To Help" (7 April 1978)
- "The Housewarming" (14 April 1978)

=== Series 2 (1978) ===
- "A Leg From The Past" (6 October 1978)
- "The Loneliness of the Long Distance Unemployed" (13 October 1978)
- "My Chap's Got Work" (20 October 1978)
- "Thou Shalt Deny Me" (27 October 1978)
- "Your Money Or Your Life" (3 November 1978)
- "You're Going To Have A What!!" (10 November 1978)

=== Series 3 (1980) ===
- "Raising The Roof" (26 October 1979)
- "Away From It All" (12 April 1980)
- "Up in the World" (19 April 1980)
- "The Anniversary Wars" (26 April 1980)
- "The Law And Mr Lambert" (3 May 1980)
- "Goodbye Charlie" (10 May 1980)
- "Your Turn For Grandad" (17 May 1980)
- "Practice Makes Perfect" (24 May 1980)
- "Survival" (31 May 1980)
- "Onto Us A Child" (7 June 1980)

Production of this series was interrupted after the recording of episode 1 by the ITV technicians' strike of 1979. The remaining nine episodes were recorded as soon as a studio became available, after higher-priority productions had been completed first. The first episode was transmitted two days after the strike ended, as schedules were very much ad hoc at this time as a result of such a long strike.

== DVD release ==
DVD	Release date
The Complete Series 1	12 March 2012
The Complete Series 2	28 May 2012
The Complete Series 3	2 July 2012
The Complete Series 1 to 3 Box Set	2022
