= Bernard Braden Reads Stephen Leacock =

Live album by Bernard Braden
- Released: 1969
- Genre: Spoken Word
- Label: Capitol

Bernard Braden Reads Stephen Leacock is a spoken word record, performed by Bernard Braden, and was recorded in front of a live audience at the Oxford Union Society. John Drainie was another performer noted for his similar one-man show as Canadian humorist Stephen Leacock.

== Personnel ==
- Bernard Braden

== Track listing ==
1. "Insurance Up to Date"
2. "We Have With Us Tonight"
3. "The Conjurer's Revenge"
4. "Impressions of London"
5. "My Financial Career"
6. "A Model Dialogue"
7. "Oxford as I See It"
8. "Save Me From My Friends"
