= Love in Pawn =

1953 British film by Charles Saunders

- Directed by: Charles Saunders
- Written by: Humphrey Knight; Guy Morgan; Frank Muir; Denis Norden
- Produced by: Robert S. Baker; Monty Berman
- Starring: Bernard Braden; Barbara Kelly; Jeannie Carson
- Cinematography: Monty Berman
- Edited by: Gordon Pilkington
- Music by: Temple Abady
- Production company: Tempean Films
- Distributed by: Eros Films
- Release date: November 23, 1953
- Running time: 82 minutes
- Country: United Kingdom
- Language: English

Love in Pawn is a 1953 British comedy film directed by Charles Saunders and starring Bernard Braden, Barbara Kelly and Jeannie Carson. It was written by Humphrey Knight, Guy Morgan, Frank Muir and Denis Nordern.

== Cast ==
- Bernard Braden as Roger Fox
- Barbara Kelly as Jean Fox
- Reg Dixon as Albert Trusslove
- Jeannie Carson as Amber Trusslove
- John Laurie as Mr. McCutcheon
- Laurence Naismith as Uncle Amos
- Walter Crisham as Hilary Stitfall
- Avice Landone as Amelia Trusslove
- Dorothy Gordon as Marlene
- Alan Robinson as Arnold Bibcock
- Tom Gill as Fred Pollock
- Hal Osmond as burglar
- Ronnie Stevens as grocer
- Kathleen Stuart as Natalie
- Michael Balfour as Alaric
- Sam Kydd as uncredited

== Critical reception ==
The Monthly Film Bulletin wrote: "This film has an amusing basic idea for its plot, but fails to be really funny. The script seems far more suitable for radio (the numerous puns and pauses make the pace wrong for a screen comedy) and the characterisation is, on the whole, weak."

The Radio Times Guide to Films gave the film 1/5 stars, writing: "Britain's popular radio (and later TV) imports from Canada, Bernard Braden and his wife Barbara Kelly, star in this indescribably puerile and unfunny comedy ... Best forgotten, which it was."

In British Sound Films: The Studio Years 1928–1959 David Quinlan rated the film as "mediocre", writing: "Popular radio husband-and-wife team in comedy that is just silly, not funny."
