= Anne Shirley =

Fictional character Anne Cuthbert

- Anne character
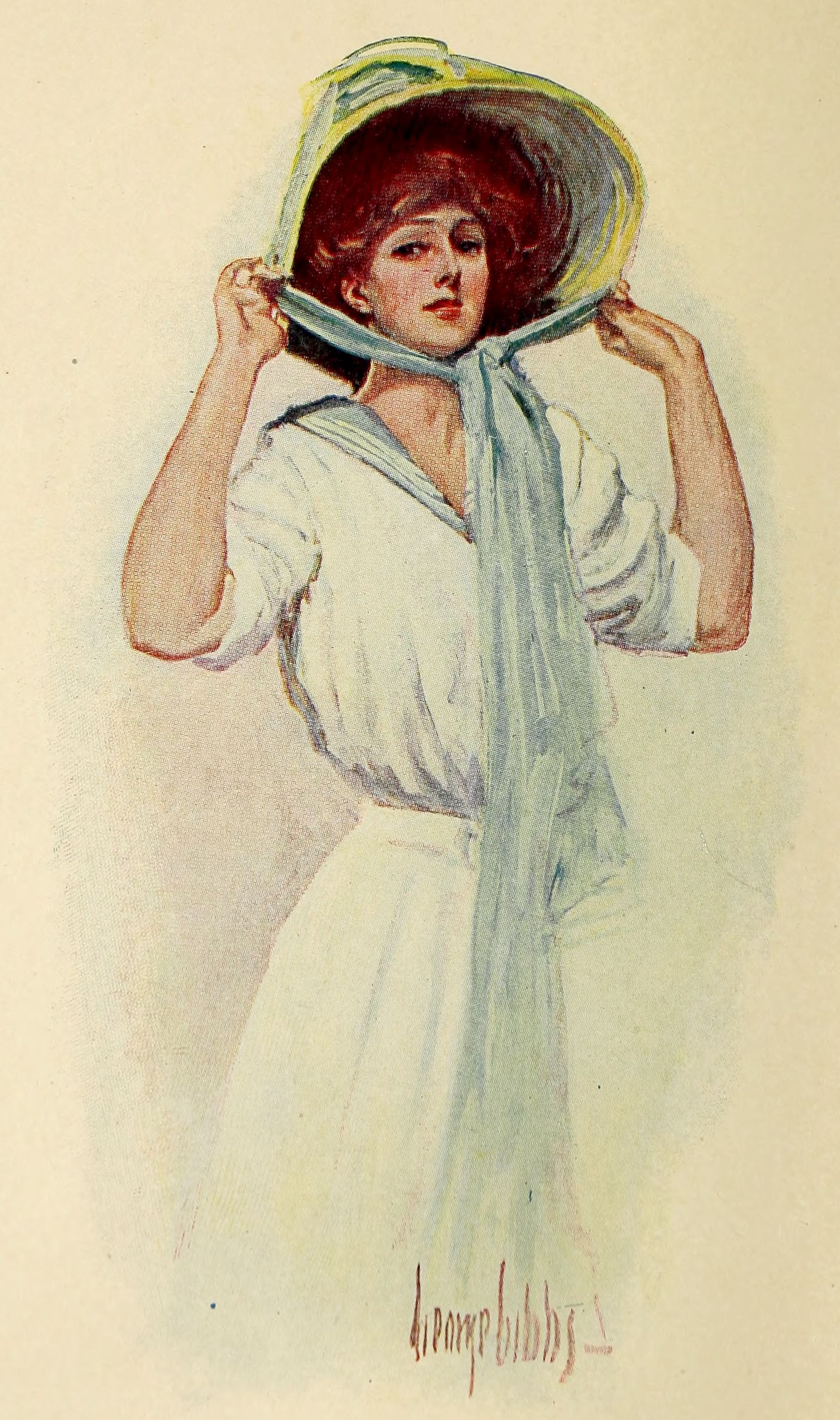
- Illustration from Anne of Avonlea
- Created by: L. M. Montgomery
- Portrayed by: Mary Miles Minter (1919); Dawn O'Day (1934); Kim Braden (1972); Megan Follows (1985); Barbara Hershey (2008); Ella Ballentine (2016); Amybeth McNulty (2017)

In-universe information
- Gender: Female
- Family: Walter Shirley (father, deceased); Bertha Willis (mother, deceased); Matthew Cuthbert (adoptive father); Marilla Cuthbert (adoptive mother)
- Spouse: Gilbert Blythe (husband)
- Children: Joyce Blythe (daughter, deceased); James Matthew Blythe (son); Walter Cuthbert Blythe (son, deceased); Anne Blythe (daughter); Diana Blythe (daughter); Shirley Blythe (son); Bertha Marilla Blythe (daughter)
- Relatives: John Blythe (father-in-law); Mrs. Blythe (mother-in-law)
- Nationality: Canadian

Anne Shirley is a fictional character introduced in the 1908 novel Anne of Green Gables by L. M. Montgomery. Shirley is featured throughout the classic book series, which revolves around her life and family in 19th century Prince Edward Island, in Canada, including the eventual adoption of a new surname.

== Conception ==
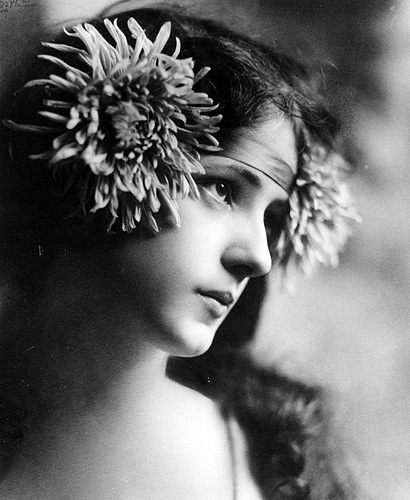
The portrait of model Evelyn Nesbit by Rudolf Eickemeyer Jr. which inspired Montgomery.

During the conception of Anne of Green Gables, Montgomery was inspired by notes she had made as a young girl about a man and a woman who were mistakenly sent an orphan girl instead of the boy they had requested, yet decided to keep her. She drew upon her own childhood experiences in rural Prince Edward Island.

These experiences included her multiple stays in the house across the street, owned by Pierce and Rachael Macneill who had applied to adopt a boy from England but by mistake were sent (on September 22, 1892) a three-year-old girl named Ellen; by the age of six, Ellen Macneill had "long... shiny, reddish hair". Montgomery noted in her journal, "The idea of getting a child from an orphan asylum was suggested to me years ago as a possible germ for a story by the fact that Pierce Macneill got a little girl from one, and I jotted it down in my notebook."

Montgomery also used a photograph of Evelyn Nesbit, which she had clipped from New York's Metropolitan Magazine and put on the wall of her bedroom, as the model for the face of Anne Shirley and a reminder of her "youthful idealism and spirituality."

== Fictional character biography ==
=== Anne's early life ===
Anne Shirley was born in the fictional town of Bolingbroke, Nova Scotia to schoolteachers Walter and Bertha Shirley (née Willis). No specific birthdate is given, but references in later works suggest her date of birth is 5 March 1865. Anne was orphaned as an infant of three months, when her parents died of typhoid fever. Without any other relations, Anne was taken in by the Shirleys' housekeeper, Mrs. Thomas. After the death of her husband, Mr. Thomas, Anne lived with the troubled Hammond family for some years and was treated as little more than a servant until Mr. Hammond died, whereupon Mrs. Hammond divided her children amongst relatives and Anne was sent to the orphanage at Hopetown. She considered herself as "cursed" by twins — Mrs. Hammond had three sets of twins whom Anne helped raise.

=== Arrival at Green Gables, Avonlea ===
At the age of 11, Anne was taken from the Hopetown orphanage to the neighbouring province of Prince Edward Island, which she regarded as her true home ever after. Unfortunately, she arrived by mistake — her sponsors, the siblings Matthew and Marilla Cuthbert, wanted to adopt a boy to help them on their farm, but the neighbour with whom they had sent the message was certain they had requested a girl instead. Matthew quickly became fascinated by the girl's good-hearted spirit, charming enthusiasm, and lively imagination, and wanted her to stay at Green Gables from the very first. Marilla's reaction was to send her back to the orphanage, but she was eventually won over by Anne's quirky joie de vivre — and by the fact that another woman, much harder than herself, was set to take Anne should Marilla decline to keep her. The American scholar Joseph Brennan noted that for Anne "all things are alive", as she imagines trees by the roadside welcoming her to Green Gables while a leaning plum tree makes her think that it is offering a veil just for her. Anne at one point says "Maples are such social things" and likes Lover's Lane because "... you can think out loud there without people calling you crazy."

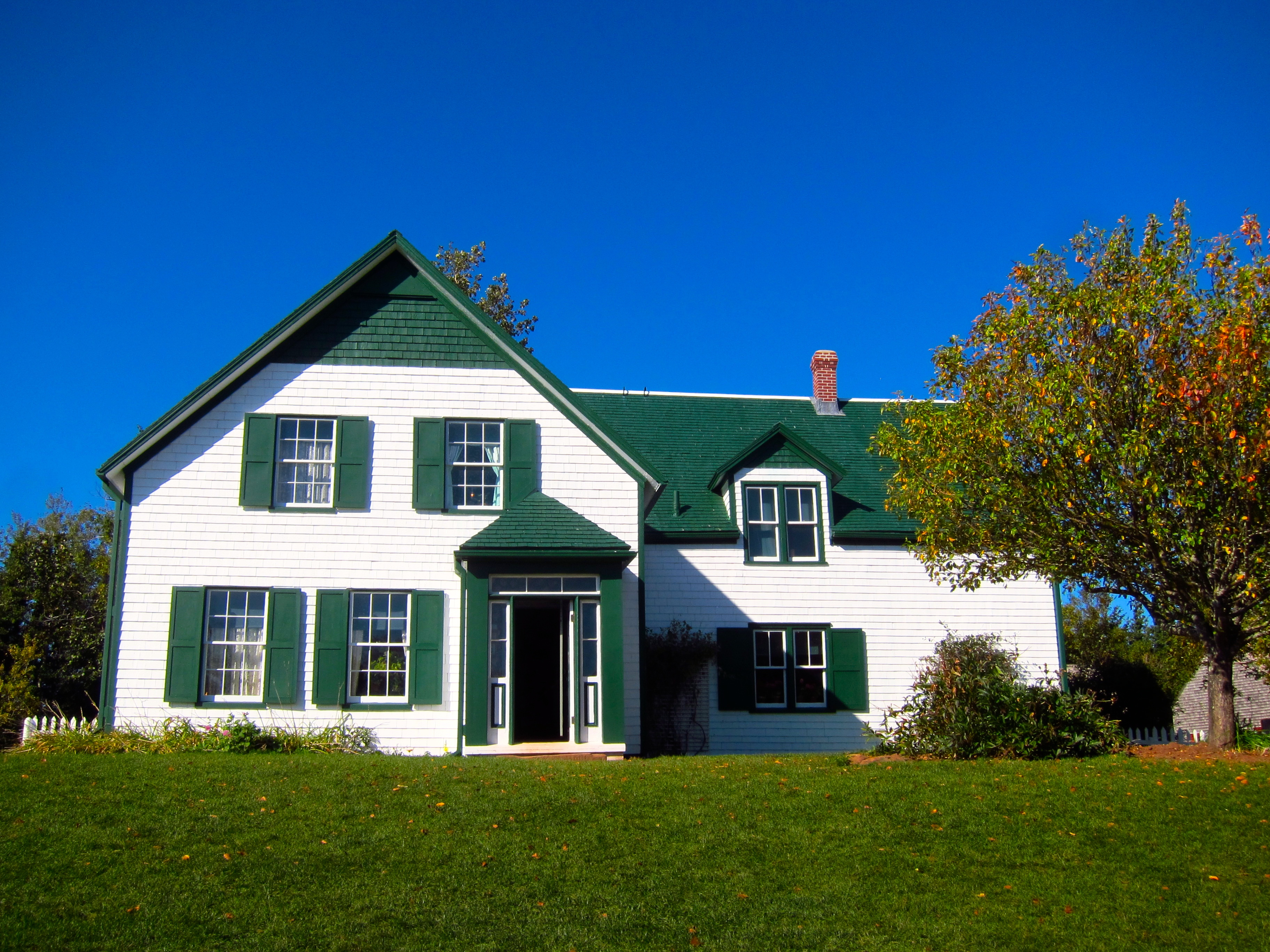
Green Gables, where Anne is raised by her adoptive parents.

Anne has great powers of imagination, fed by books of poetry and romance, and a passion for "romantic" and beautiful names and places. When she sees a road lined with apple trees in bloom, she falls silent for a moment before naming the road the "White Way of Delight"; when spying a pond at the Barry homestead, she christens it the "Lake of Shining Waters." Anne had been starved of love at the orphanages she has lived at, and for her, Green Gables is the only true home she has ever known. Anne's imaginative nature matches well with her passionate, warm side, full of bubbly optimism and enthusiasm. Her impulsive nature leads her into all sorts of "scrapes", and she alternates between being carried away with enthusiasm and being in the "depths of despair". One scholar Elizabeth Watson has observed a recurring theme, noting Anne's observations of sunsets mirror her own development. Under the White Way of Delight, Anne watches the sun set which is to her a glory where "a painted sunset sky shone like a great rose window at the end of a cathedral aisle". By the end of the novel, when Anne watches the sun set, it set across a backdrop of "flowers of quiet happiness", as Anne is slowly falling in love with Gilbert.

Anne initially made a poor impression on the townsfolk of Avonlea with an outburst at the Cuthberts' neighbour, the outspoken gossip Mrs. Rachel Lynde, but this was amended by an equally impassioned apology. Anne soon became 'bosom friends' with a girl from a neighbouring farm, Diana Barry. Together with Matthew, Diana is Anne's "kindred spirit". The friendship was disrupted by the temporary enmity of Diana's mother, after Anne mistakenly made Diana drunk with Marilla's homemade currant wine, mistaking it for raspberry cordial. Anne was soon restored to Mrs. Barry's good graces by saving the life of Diana's little sister, Minnie May. Minnie May had an attack of the croup, which Anne was able to cure with a bottle of ipecac and knowledge acquired while caring for the numerous Hammond twins. Throughout her childhood, Anne continued to find herself in similar "scrapes", often through mistakes and misunderstandings, and no fault of her own. At one point Anne "admires to the point of nuttiness" an amethyst brooch, which she is falsely accused of stealing, a crime she has to confess to in order to attend a picnic. Anne tends to define herself in opposition to older people via humour, and forges a relationship with Marilla Cuthbert via humour. The dreamy and imaginative Anne asks that Marilla call her "Cordelia" and "Geraldine" as Anne likes to imagine herself as somebody that she is not.

Anne also formed a complex relationship with Gilbert Blythe, who was two years older than Anne but studying at her level, having had his schooling interrupted when his father became ill. On their first meeting as schoolmates, Gilbert teased Anne with the nickname "Carrots". Anne, perceiving it as a personal insult due to sensitivity over her hair colour, became so angry that she broke her slate over his head. When her teacher punished her by making her stand in front of the class, and then later punishes her for tardiness by making her sit with "the boys", specifically Gilbert Blythe, Anne forms a long-lasting hatred of Gilbert Blythe. Anne tells Diana that "Gilbert Blythe has hurt me excruciatingly". Throughout Anne of Green Gables, Gilbert repeatedly displays admiration for Anne, but she coldly rebuffs him. Her grudge persisted even after he saved her from a near-disastrous reenactment of Tennyson's "Lancelot and Elaine" when her leaky boat sank into the pond. After this almost fatal accident, Gilbert pleaded with Anne to become his friend but she hesitated and refused, although she soon came to regret it. For the rest of their school years in Avonlea, they competed as intellectual rivals for the top of the class, although the competition was entirely good-natured on Gilbert's side. However, Anne forms the "Story Club" at the age of 13, which she tells the story of two girls named Cordelia and Geraldine (both of which were aliases she had adopted earlier) who both love Bertram - a variant of Gilbert. The story ends with Cordelia pushing Geraldine into a river to drown with Bertram, which suggests subconsciously Anne is attracted to Gilbert. Near the end, Anne and Gilbert walk together to Green Gables, where Gilbert only-jokingly says: "You've thwarted destiny long enough." At the end of Anne of Green Gables, Anne looks out of her window admiring Avonlea as an "ideal world of dreams", through she sees a "bend in the road" thanks to Gilbert. Mrs. Lynde at the beginning of the book was the self-important busybody of Avonlea who dominated the community; at the end, the book hints that Anne will play the same role, but only much better in the years to come.

=== Avonlea schoolteacher years ===
Immediately after graduating from Avonlea's public school, Anne and Gilbert both went to Queen's Academy in Charlottetown, which trained them for teaching and university studies. They split the most prestigious prizes between themselves, and remained "enemies" all through their studies at Queen's. Anne's grades, especially in English, won her a scholarship to Redmond College, but Matthew's death and Marilla's failing eyesight near the end of Anne of Green Gables led Anne to defer her enrollment at Redmond so that she could stay to help at Green Gables. Gilbert had been appointed as the Avonlea schoolteacher for the following year, but as an act of kindness, he instead took the position at White Sands School and gave the Avonlea position to Anne. She thanked him for the sacrifice and they made amends, becoming friends at last after five years of intense rivalry. Anne reads some poetry by Virgil, but abandons the book as the beauty of sun-kissed summer day and her coming career as a teacher inspire a sense of happiness and unity with nature.

In Anne of Avonlea, Marilla decided to take in her third cousin's twin children, Davy and Dora (continuing Anne's "curse of twins"). However, Anne took to them, especially Davy, immediately. Anne learns to manage the twins via a mixture of good humour and understanding. Besides teaching, Anne joins the Village Improvement Society that works to demolish ugly abandoned houses, repaint the village and plant a garden at the crossroads. The mean-spirited neighbour Mr. Harrison attacks Anne as a "red-headed snippet" who sits around "reading yellow-covered novels". When a famous author Mrs. Morgan visits Avonlea, Anne greets her with a nose turned red owing to her mistakes in applying the wrong skin lotion as Anne goes to absurd lengths to be prepared to meet the world-famous Mrs. Morgan, which results in chaos, though all works out well in the end. Meeting Mrs. Morgan inspires Anne to try writing, where trapped in an abandoned hen-house, she writes out a dialogue between flowers and the birds in the garden. Another scrape occurs at her school, where Anne forces a student to throw a package into the school stove, unaware that the offending package were firecrackers. The following year, Rachel Lynde's husband Thomas died and Rachel moved in with Marilla at Green Gables, leaving Anne free to continue her education at Redmond College (based on Dalhousie College) in Kingsport, Nova Scotia. Anne was pleased because Gilbert would also be going to Redmond the following year. After the wedding of her friend Miss Lavendar, Anne first realized that there was a possibility that Gilbert felt more for her than friendship, and "The page of girlhood had been turned, as by an unseen finger, and the page of womanhood was before her with all its charm and mystery, its pain and gladness." Anne once again walks with Gilbert while the narrator notes, "Behind them the little stone house brooded among the shadows. It was lonely but not forsaken. It had not yet done with dreams and laughter and joy of life".

=== Redmond College ===
In Anne of the Island, Anne's academic and social life blossom at Redmond. Anne says at the beginning "I'm going to study and grow and learn about things". Anne visits the house where she was born, in Bolingbroke, and ponders deeply how her mother died young, but at least knew the joys of love. During her time at Redmond, Anne writes two stories, one of which is rejected, but turned by Diana into a successful story, and another which is dismissed because it has no plot. Anne's story "Averil's Atonement" is edited by Diana into a successful story that sells well, but Anne sees the final published version as a travesty that mangles her artistic vision. Seeking poetical inspiration, Anne spends her time alone on Victoria Island (significantly named after the queen-empress whose empire stretched around the world), Anne withdraws into her own world of fantasies amid a landscape "curtained with fine-spun, moonlit gloom, while the water laughed around her in a duet of brook and water".

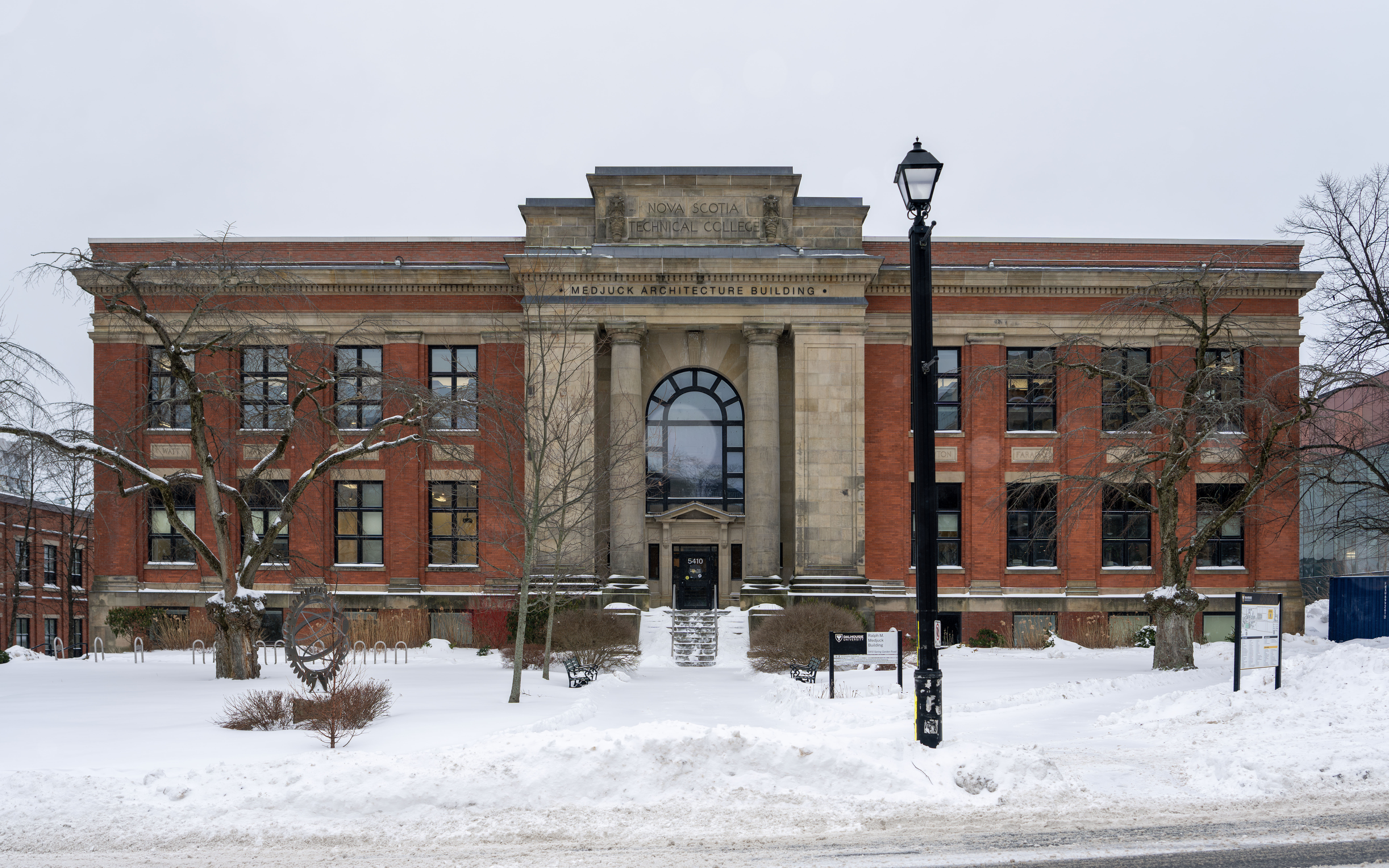
Dalhousie University (then Dalhousie College), the institution on which Montgomery based Redmond College

At the beginning of the novel, Anne and Gilbert, looking forward to a "splendid four years at Redmond," wander around to the Haunted Wood to taste the "delicious apples" where "under tawny skin was white, white flesh, faintly veined with red; and besides their own proper apple taste, they had a certain wild, delightful tang". The Canadian scholar Elizabeth Waterson noted the "erotic" overtones to the scene of the apple tasting in the Haunted Wood, as sign of Anne's attraction to Gilbert of which she herself is not entirely aware. Anne's favourite hangout is Patty's Place, where she and her three best friends spent their evenings by a fireplace with three cats, two china dogs and a pot full of chrysanthemums that light up "through the golden gloom like creamy moons".

Gilbert, who has always loved Anne, proposes to her, but she rejects him; at that time, Anne's vision of love is rooted deeply in sentimental fantasies and she does not recognize her closeness to Gilbert as love. Anne calls Gilbert's marriage proposal "grotesque or horrible". She believes that she will fall in love with her "prince," who would fit her childhood ideal of "tall, dark, and handsome". Feeling deeply disappointed, Gilbert distances himself from Anne. Anne "haughtily" refuses Charlie Sloane's offer of marriage. Anne later welcomes the courtship of the darkly handsome Roy Gardner whom she meets one rainy afternoon in the November of her junior year. After about a year and a half of courtship, he proposes in the park where they met, but Anne ends their relationship instead, realizing that she does not truly love him and he does not belong in her life. Anne reacts "wildly," "miserably," and "desperately" to his proposal. Anne quotes from a poem by Tennyson: "Love in sequel works with Fate, and draws the veil from hidden worth".

After graduating from Redmond College with a B.A., Anne, now 22, returns to Avonlea and finds that life has moved on— her childhood friend Jane married a millionaire, and her best friend Diana Barry (now Diana Wright) has given birth to her firstborn. Anne still does not believe she is in love with Gilbert, but she is disappointed at the end of their friendship, and confused over her reaction to gossip that he is in love with Christine Stuart, a fellow Redmond student.

=== Engagement to Gilbert ===
Upon her return to Avonlea after staying with her friends Paul, Stephen, and Lavendar Irving at Echo Lodge, Anne learns that Gilbert is deathly ill with typhoid fever. Anne holds vigil in her room at Green Gables the night Gilbert's fever breaks, realizing that she had always loved Gilbert only when faced with the prospect of losing him. Once Gilbert recovers from his illness, he proposes again to Anne, and she accepts. Gilbert offers her an autumnal fantasy "of a home with a hearth-fire in it, a cat and a dog, the footsteps of friends -- and you!". It is explained that Christine had been engaged to someone else all along and Gilbert was only being friendly, having been asked by Christine's brother to watch over her. Anne's friend Phil Blake had written Gilbert, telling him to "try again," and he rapidly recovered in order to take that advice. Anne and Gilbert once again walk in the "haunted woods" as "king and queen in the bridal realm of love".

Their engagement lasts for three years. Her engagement ring is noted to be a circlet of pearls rather than a diamond, a stone which Anne said always disappointed her because it wasn't the lovely purple she had dreamed of. Anne takes a job as a principal at Prince Edward Island's second-largest town, Summerside, while Gilbert completes his three-year medical school course. During this time, Anne interacts with various eccentrics at both work and around the town. Significantly, Anne rises up to become the principal of the Summerside school, making her an equal with Gilbert. As both principal and a teacher, Anne has to deal with the difficult vice-principal Katherine Brooke, who goes out of her way to be rude to her. Brooke openly envies Anne's ability to have a "jolie vie," and tries to drag her down at every chance. A mature Anne has now risen above her youthful "scrapes" and is motivated by a desire to help others, realizing that Brooke's nastiness is due to her own low self-esteem, and helps her find a job that suits her better than teaching.

=== Marriage and motherhood ===
Anne and Gilbert finally marry at Green Gables, the house Anne grew up in, and move to the village of Four Winds, P.E.I. There, they take up residence in a small house Anne dubs the "House of Dreams", and Gilbert takes over his uncle's medical practice in the nearby town of Glen St. Mary. Anne praises her "house of dreams" as "like a creamy seashell stranded on the harbour shore", which is surrounded by fir trees "enfolding secrets" while the lane leading to the house is full of blossoming trees.The house looks up to a harbour on one side and a shining brook in the valley below. Anne's major problem at the House of Dreams is helping her neighbour Leslie Moore, whose husband was left with brain damage after an accident, and who is as emotionally damaged as her husband is brain-damaged.

Anne's first two children (one of whom dies in infancy) are born in the House of Dreams, before Anne and Gilbert and their growing family reluctantly move to larger quarters. In a moment of theological reflection, Anne questions if the death of her child is the "will of God", using phrases exploring the theodical question of death and pain in a universe presided by a just God that are identical to those Montgomery used in her diary after her second son was stillborn. After Anne's loss, she and Leslie bond as the two women share their stories of pain as they "talk it out", leading them to hold hands and declare: "We are both women—and friends forever". Anne and Gilbert live the rest of their lives in Glen St. Mary, in a large house they name Ingleside. They have a total of seven children between approximately 1895-1900: Joyce (or "Joy") (who dies very soon after her birth at the House of Dreams), James Matthew ("Jem"), Walter Cuthbert, twin girls Anne ("Nan") and Diana ("Di"), Shirley (the youngest son), and Bertha Marilla ("Rilla"). Anne is quite ill after the births of both Joyce and Shirley, but recovers both times. A major problem for Anne emerges when Gilbert's obnoxious Aunt Mary Maria visits and refuses to leave, tormenting Anne in various ways.

Anne's children enjoy a happy, even idyllic childhood, spending much of their time playing and adventuring in a nearby hollow they name Rainbow Valley. Anne is a permissive mother who is never harsh on her children and does not object when they play hide-and-seek with the new minister's children in the cemetery. When a friend objects, Anne replies: "Why did they ever build that manse beside the graveyard in the first place?". Anne's children are often bullied by nasty children, requiring their mother to provide much consolation. When Shirley reads about the theory of a Jocasta complex in one of Gilbert's medical journals together with a warning about mothers kissing their children, she says: "A man of course! No woman would ever write anything so silly and wicked". At one point, Anne tries to resume her writing career, publishing a very poetical obituary for a neighbour that is mocked as an "obitchery" by an ignorant, rude newspaper editor, though it is well received by everyone else. Anne herself has a comfortable life, with a live-in maid (Susan Baker) who effectively runs the household and is also Shirley's primary caregiver after Anne falls ill giving birth to him. Upon recovering, Anne says: "I find I go on living". After Anne recovers, she is involved in various ladies' committees in town, and travels to Europe with Gilbert for an extended tour of the European continent at one point, circa 1906.

But the spectre of World War I in 1914 changes things, and all three Blythe boys (as well as the fiancés of Nan and Rilla) eventually volunteer to fight in the war. The Blythe family, which follows the war closely, soon becomes familiar with far-away places such as Calais, Mons, Lodz, Ypres, Belgrade, Amiens, Prezemysl, Gallipoli, Antwerp and Kut al Amara. The sensitive and poetic Walter, the second of Anne's sons to volunteer, is killed at Courcelette in 1916. Jem is listed as missing at the war's conclusion, but after an agonizing five months, eventually emerges alive, having escaped from a POW camp. Montgomery knew John McCrae, the author of the poem In Flanders Fields, and she modelled Walter partly on him.

=== Anne the grandmother ===
Anne's final appearance occurs in the collection The Blythes Are Quoted. In this work, which is somewhat darker in tone than the previous Anne books, we see brief glimpses of Anne in a number of short stories that are primarily about other inhabitants of Glen St. Mary, and are set from the pre-World War I era through to the beginning of World War II. The book also features a number of poems, which are separately credited to Anne and her son Walter (plus one that was started by Walter and completed by Anne after his death).

We last see an older and wiser Anne, now in her mid-seventies, in the early days of World War II. "Mrs. Dr. Blythe", as she is often referred to, is a well-known, oft-discussed figure in Glen St. Mary, who is loved by some, though other residents express small-minded jealousy or envy of both Anne and her family. While Anne has mellowed from the days of her youth, she and Gilbert still engage in sly, good-natured teasing of each other. She has continued to indulge in her love of matchmaking, and also writes poetry. She is still married to Gilbert and is now a grandmother to at least five, three of whom are old enough to be enlist to fight in the war: Jem's sons Jem Jr. and Walter Jr., and Rilla's son Gilbert. Also mentioned are Nan's daughter Diana, Rilla's daughter Rilla, and a granddaughter named "Anne Blythe", who might be either Jem or Shirley's child.

Though Anne gives up writing short stories shortly after becoming a mother, she continues to write poems throughout her life. These poems are regularly shared with the rest of the family, who offer comments, criticism and encouragement. Anne's later work expressed deep difficulties with coming to terms with Walter's demise, and with the idea of war; several characters comment that neither Anne nor Gilbert were ever quite the same after Walter's death. Still, the couple are utterly devoted to each other and their family, and as the saga concludes, circa 1940, the Blythes remain pillars of their community who have enjoyed a 50-year marriage.

== Literary appearances ==
After Anne of Green Gables (1908), Anne is the central character of subsequent novels by Montgomery: Anne of Avonlea (1909), Anne of the Island (1915), Anne's House of Dreams (1917), Anne of Windy Poplars (1936; UK title Anne of Windy Willows), and Anne of Ingleside (1939). Other books in the Anne series include Rainbow Valley (1919), which focuses on Anne's children during their childhood, and Rilla of Ingleside (1921), which focuses on Anne's youngest daughter during World War I.

Anne also appears and is mentioned in Chronicles of Avonlea and Further Chronicles of Avonlea, though the bulk of the stories in these volumes are about other characters. In The Blythes Are Quoted (published in an abridged format as The Road to Yesterday and in a restored, unabridged edition in 2009), Anne is a peripheral character as a grandmother with several grandchildren, at least three of whom are preparing to enlist in the Canadian army during the opening days of World War II. These were among the last stories Montgomery wrote before her death in 1942.

Anne Shirley also appears in Budge Wilson's Before Green Gables, a prequel to Anne of Green Gables authorized by the heirs of L.M. Montgomery. Based on background information from the original series, the book tells of the first 11 years of Anne Shirley's childhood, beginning with the brief happiness of Bertha and Walter Shirley's marriage before their early deaths.

== Film and television ==
Anne Shirley has been portrayed by many actresses in numerous film, television, radio, and theatrical versions since 1919. She was played by Mary Miles Minter in Anne of Green Gables (1919) a silent film directed by William Desmond Taylor and released by Paramount Pictures. The film was heavily panned by Montgomery, who dismissed the Americanization of the story. Dawn O'Day starred in the subsequent RKO remake, Anne of Green Gables (1934), which garnered such commercial success that O'Day became permanently billed as Anne Shirley in the 1940 sequel and her future works.

On television, Toby Tarnow starred in a musical adaption of Anne of Green Gables (1956) which aired on CBC Television. The BBC serial Anne of Green Gables (1972) and its sequel, Anne of Avonlea (1975), featured Kim Braden as the titular character. Megan Follows starred in the television film Anne of Green Gables (1985), directed by Kevin Sullivan and produced by the CBC. Follows reprised her role in Anne of Green Gables: The Sequel (1987) and Anne of Green Gables: The Continuing Story (2000). The series garnered critical acclaim, its accolades including a Peabody Award and Emmy Award for Outstanding Children's Program.

Both Hannah Endicott-Douglas and Barbara Hershey starred Anne of Green Gables: A New Beginning (2008), also directed by Sullivan. Ella Ballentine portrayed Anne in L.M. Montgomery's Anne of Green Gables (2016) and its two sequels, Anne of Green Gables: The Good Stars (2017) and Anne of Green Gables: Fire & Dew (2017) which aired on YTV. Amybeth McNulty starred in the CBC/Netflix episodic drama Anne with an E (2017–2019), which garnered the Canadian Screen Award for Best Dramatic Series twice, and won McNulty the accolade for Best Lead Actress.

== Reception and legacy ==
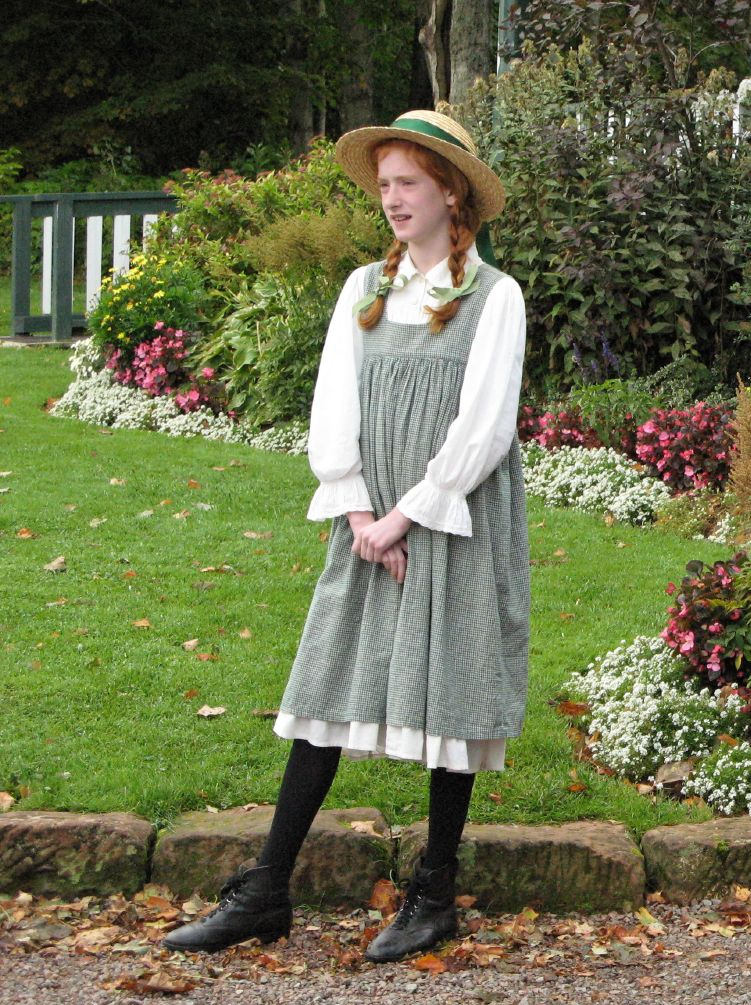
An actress as Anne Shirley, at the Anne of Green Gables Museum in Cavendish, Prince Edward Island

Lennie Goodings, a publisher for Virago Press, chose Anne as her favourite fictional character, stating, "The feisty, funny and above all unabashedly passionate Anne of Green Gables...[she] faces the world with absolutely nothing but the sheer force of her personality. I love her." Actress Christina Hendricks cites the character as the reason for dyeing her naturally blonde hair red since the age of 10.

The British scholar Faye Hammill observed that such is the popularity of Shirley that she has overshadowed her creator, L.M. Montgomery, as license plates in Prince Edward Island bear the slogan "P.E.I Home of Anne of Green Gables" rather than "P.E.I Birthplace of L.M Montgomery".

The actress Mary Miles Minter, who played Shirley in the 1919 film adaption of Anne of Green Gables, later had her career ruined when the film director William Desmond Taylor was murdered in 1922, and her name came up as a suspect, though she was never charged. When Minter attempted a comeback as an advice columnist later in the 1920s, she used the pen-name Anne Shirley in an attempt to restore her wholesome image, which had been ruined by the Taylor murder scandal.

The actress Dawn O'Day, who played Shirley in the 1934 film adaption of Anne of Green Gables, liked the character so much she legally changed her name to Anne Shirley.

Montgomery during her youth had experiences of what she called "the flash"-moments of quiet contemplation of the beauty of nature when she was walking alone that gave her emotional ecstasy and what she regarded as the awareness of a higher spiritual power running through nature and her. Despite Montgomery's claim that Shirley was not autobiographical, the moments when Shirley experienced moments of a mystical communion with nature are almost word for word the same as Montgomery's descriptions of "the flash" in her diary.

Much of the appeal of the Anne books was due to increased urbanization and industrialization in the early 20th century, which led many people to look back nostalgically to a romanticized rural idyll when people still lived the "simple life", which was precisely how publishers marketed the Anne books at the time. In Canada itself, many intellectuals tended to see modernity as a threatening phenomenon, and in turn linked the more unpleasant aspects of modernity to the United States, which was viewed at the time as a rapacious, bullying nation intent upon devouring its neighbours. Much of the appeal of the character of Anne to Canadian critics at the time was as a symbol of the wholesome, friendly quality of Canadian life, where people still retained traditional values, unlike American writers with their obsession with violence and sex in stories set in a depersonalized urban environment. Hammill observed that when some of the younger Canadian writers in the 1920s-30s attempted to ape American writers with unpleasant "realistic" stories focusing on sex and violence in the cities, they were denounced by the critics for their "American" stories with the obvious implication that such stories were not "Canadian". As urbanization gathered pace in the early 20th century, "regional literature" depicting life in rural regions gained popularity in the English-speaking world, and in the United States, Canadian literature was seen as a type of "regional literature" as Canada with its vast tracts of forests and farmland together with its British heritage, where the people were proud to be part of the British empire, which gave Canada a rather quaint image in the United States as a backward, rustic place, where the traditional values lived on. Having won their independence in the Revolutionary War, for Americans in the early 20th century it was almost incomprehensible that people in English-Canada should want to be part of the British empire, which gave Canada the image of a very conservative society in the United States in this era. Given these views of Canada, many Americans were inclined to share the Canadian view of Shirley as an iconic symbol of Canada.

Brennan wrote the Anne books are determinedly Anglo-Canadian as French-Canadians hardly ever appear in the books. Brennan wrote: "Anne's dreams knew more of Tennyson's Camelot than of the rich culture of New France, of its voyageurs, its habitants, of heroines such as Maria Chapdelaine who appeared in Canadian letters (thanks to a young wander from France) when Montgomery's Anne had already firmly settled in home and motherhood. Avonlea was not Péribonka. Yet an artist in words-and Montgomery was that-should not be held at fault for silence about a culture so unlike her own". Brennan noted that the Anne books reflected the "quiet conservative society" that was Prince Edward Island in the Victorian age with the characters being Protestants of English and/or Scottish extraction, and Anne supporting the Conservatives "simply because her beloved Matthew voted Conservative".

In 1912, Anne of Green Gables was translated into Polish and published in a pirate edition in Warsaw with the book being credited to "Anne Montgomery". The book was extremely popular in Poland and during the Second World War; the Armia Krajowa (AK) resistance group issued editions of the book to remind its members what they were fighting for. Even through there is nothing about Poland in the Anne books, the AK still saw her as a symbol of the humanist values that they were defending. For a time, Anne of Green Gables was banned in Communist Poland, and the book circulated in samizdat editions, as Anne was seen as a symbol of individualism and an unwillingness to submit to authority, making her a popular heroine for those struggling against the Communist dictatorship. The Canadian scholar Mary Henley Rubio mentioned when visiting Warsaw in 1984, where she saw a version of Anne of Green Gables being performed in a local theatre, and that when the audience learned she was from Canada, she found herself mobbed by the audience who all wanted her autograph as she came from the same land as their beloved Anne.

Akage no An (Red Haired Anne), as Shirley is known in Japan, is an extremely popular cultural icon in that country. From the time of the Meiji Restoration until 1945, the Japanese educational system (which was run jointly by the Army and Navy ministries) was designed to indoctrinate the students into Bushido ("the way of the warrior"), the fierce warrior code of the Samurai, as the purpose of schools in Japan at the time was to train the boys to be soldiers. The Japanese educational system unabashedly glorified war as the highest form of human activity, and taught the idea that the Emperor of Japan was a living god; the boys being taught it was the greatest honour to die for the Emperor, while the girls were taught it was the greatest honour to have sons to die for the Emperor. Alongside the militarism of the educational system went a mood of marked xenophobia and outright racism, with Japanese teachers during World War II telling their students that the Anglo-American "white devils" were cannibals whose favourite food was Asians. As part of the educational reforms during the American occupation (1945–52), it was decided that Japanese students needed something somewhat less militaristic and xenophobic to read than texts glorifying Bushido and Anne of Green Gables was made mandatory reading in Japanese schools in 1952. Additionally, as part of the educational reforms in Japan, there was an effort to reduce the previous rampant xenophobia that characterized Japanese teaching until 1945, and it was felt the wholesome, lovable character of Anne Shirley would provide Japanese students with an example of how people in the West were not "white devils" as their government had told them during the war. As there were many orphans left over from World War II in 1952 Japan, the character of Shirley instantly caught on in Japan, and she has been one of the most loved characters in Japan since that time. Much of the appeal of Akage no An lies in her ability to rise above any situation due to her pluck and her willingness to challenge "that most formidable of Japanese dragons, the bossy older matron."

Shirley is so popular in Japan that there is a school called The Anne Academy in Fukuoka, which teaches girls how to speak English with a Maritime accent, while in Okayama there is The School of Green Gables, a nursing school that teaches young women how to behave like Shirley. Hanako Muraoka, the Japanese woman who translated Anne of Green Gables into Japanese, has become a celebrity in her own right solely for translating the book, and in 2014 NHK aired a television mini-series titled Hanako to Anne about Muraoka's life and her struggle to get Anne of Green Gables translated and published in Japan. Muraoka read Anne of Green Gables in 1939 and started translating the book the same year, but it wasn't until 1952 that her translation of Anne of Green Gables was finally published in Japan. Hanako to Anne, which aired in 2014, was a great rating success, getting an average of 22% viewership in the Kanto region (the most populous part of Japan), and caused a doubling of Japanese tourists to Prince Edward Island. The series, which starred Yuriko Yoshitaka as Muraoka, suggested that there were many parallels between Muraoka's life and Anne's, and thus was a sort of retelling of Anne's life in the late Meiji, Taishō and early Shōwa periods of Japanese history. In 1993, a theme park called Canadian World opened in Hokkaido whose most popular attraction was a reproduction of Green Gables. In 2010, the Globe and Mail wrote: "It could almost be declared that Anne's true home isn't rural Prince Edward Island any more. It's Japan, where Lucy Maud Montgomery's tale of Anne and her pigtailed innocence remains so popular that it has become ingrained in the national consciousness since the book's original Japanese translation as Red-Haired Anne in 1952." In 2014, the Japanese diplomat Eiji Yamamoto told a journalist from the Toronto Star: "Even though she's an orphan, Anne is a free spirit, she says anything she wants. In the years after World War II, the Japanese people were poor. There were many orphans. And people had lost hope. They were anxious. Anne is an optimist. She helped people get courage."

The Canadian scholar Janice Kulyk Keefer noted the character of Shirley as depicted in film and television is sanitised compared to the book, writing:

Death, the bloody laws of nature, the tyranny of adults, violence-all poison the sweetness of ... Arcadia. And yet the idyllic vision is undercut by what we might call call 'meta-idylls', realized through the forces of magic, fantasy, mass-cultural cliche and language itself. Together, 'menace' and 'meta-idyll' produce subversive subtexts to each idyll.

In 2019, Canadian publishing company Bradan Press crowdfunded Anna Ruadh, a Scottish-Gaelic translation of Anne of Green Gables through the crowdfunding website Kickstarter. It was released in 2020.
