= Anne of Green Gables (miniseries) =

1972 British TV series

- Based on: Anne of Green Gables by Lucy Maud Montgomery
- Written by: Julia Jones
- Directed by: Joan Craft
- Starring: Kim Braden; Elliott Sullivan; Barbara Hamilton; Avis Bunnage
- Country of origin: United Kingdom
- Original language: English

Production
- Producer: John McRae
- Running time: 280 minutes

Original release
- Release: 20 February 1972

Anne of Green Gables is a 1972 British television miniseries directed by Joan Craft, based on the 1908 novel Anne of Green Gables by Lucy Maud Montgomery.

Despite many of the BBC's costume drama serials made during the 1970s surviving, all five episodes of this serial were wiped and it is effectively considered lost.

== Cast ==
- Kim Braden – Anne Shirley
- Robin Halstead – Gilbert Blythe
- Barbara Hamilton – Marilla Cuthbert
- Elliott Sullivan – Matthew Cuthbert
- Jan Francis – Diana Barry
- Avis Bunnage – Rachel Lynde

== Episodes ==
No.	Title	Directed by	Written by	Original release date
1	TBA	Joan Craft	Julia Jones	February 20, 1972
2	TBA	Unknown	Unknown	February 27, 1972
3	TBA	TBA	TBA	TBA
4	TBA	TBA	TBA	TBA
5	TBA	TBA	TBA	TBA

== Reception ==
Writing in The Daily Telegraph, Sean Day-Lewis said that Sullivan and Hamilton were "marvellously right" as Anne's foster parents. He praised Braden for capturing the "extrovert, chatterbox quality" of Anne, but said her crying was not believable.

== Sequel ==
Joan Craft returned to direct the 1975 sequel Anne of Avonlea, also starring Kim Braden. It is based on the second and third books of the series, Anne of Avonlea and Anne of the Island.
