= Bernard Braden =

British actor (1916–1993)

- Born: 16 May 1916; Vancouver, British Columbia, Canada
- Died: 2 February 1993 (aged 76); London, England
- Occupations: Actor, comedian
- Years active: 1951–1989
- Known for: On the Braden Beat
- Spouse: Barbara Kelly (m. 1942)
- Children: 3, including Kim Braden

Bernard Chastey Braden (16 May 1916 – 2 February 1993) was a Canadian-born British actor and comedian, who is best known for his appearances in UK television and radio shows.

== Life ==
Braden was born in Vancouver, British Columbia, and educated at Magee Secondary School, Kerrisdale, Vancouver. He produced plays on CJOR Vancouver in the late 1930s and early 1940s. He married Barbara Kelly in 1942, and they moved to Toronto the same year. They had two children, Christopher and Kelly Braden. Seven years later, he, his wife and two children moved to England. A third child, Kim, was born in London in 1949.

He was the subject of This Is Your Life in 1991, when he was surprised by Michael Aspel outside the Aldwych Theatre.

Braden died in Camden, London, aged 76, following a series of strokes.

== Career ==
=== Radio ===
In Breakfast with Braden (for the BBC, from January 1950) he played American serviceman "Brandon Marlow" (a caricature of Marlon Brando in A Streetcar Named Desire). Other cast members acted as stooges, including Pearl Carr ("Sing, Pearl"), Benny Lee and bandleader Nat Temple ("Play, Nat!").

Other BBC radio shows followed: Bedtime with Braden (from September 1950), which included his signature sign-out song "Lullaby of Birdland"; Between Time; Bathtime; and Bedlam with Braden. Ronald Fletcher, the announcer, was drawn into the script which added to the ingenuity and enjoyment.

Braden also appeared in 1951 alongside his wife in An Evening at Home with Bernard Braden and Barbara Kelly.

=== Television ===
In 1960, Braden interviewed Orson Welles in Allen King's documentary, "Orson Welles: The Paris Interview," produced for the Canadian Broadcasting Corporation.

Braden presented On the Braden Beat, a popular consumer affairs programme made for ITV by Associated Television, which ran from 1962 to 1967. Jock Watson and, later, Francis Coleman produced this Saturday late-night show, which also examined current political issues affecting the British public. The show was interspersed with lighthearted sketches and music, and helped a number of actors to get a start on television. Performers frequently featured included Peter Cook, Jake Thackray and Tim Brooke-Taylor.

A successor with essentially the same format, Braden's Week, appeared when he transferred to the BBC from 1967 to 1972. This show may have been cancelled because he advertised margarine on the BBC's commercial rival ITV; the BBC felt this was inconsistent with his role as the consumers' spokesman. Esther Rantzen, one of the researcher/presenters, went on to front a similar consumer-focused show, That's Life!. In 1974, Braden also hosted a short-lived Canadian edition of The Braden Beat for Canada's fledgling Global Television Network.

Braden hosted a quiz show for London Weekend Television in 1976, The Sweepstakes Game. Two contestants decided which of six star guests were most likely to help them to win cash and prizes.

He later (1987-1989) presented episodes of the show All Our Yesterdays.

Braden independently produced and shot in 1967-68 an extended series of interviews of public figures, conducted by himself (and sometimes by his wife), for a series called Now and Then but the series was never completed or sold to a broadcaster. The series was re-edited in 2008 as Sex Drugs and Rock 'n' Roll: The 60s Revealed, in which the original interviewees saw their 1968 interviews for the first time.

=== Film and stage ===
His few film appearances included Love in Pawn (1953), Jet Storm (1959), The Full Treatment (1960), The Day the Earth Caught Fire (1961) (as the news editor of the Daily Express), and the 1962 films Two and Two Make Six and All Night Long. In the same year he played Flight Surgeon Randall in the British film The War Lover, alongside Steve McQueen, Robert Wagner and a young Michael Crawford.

He also narrated the 20-minute British Transport Films short The Coasts of Clyde, in which he announces himself as a Canadian traveller arriving in Scotland in pursuit of an ancestor in the land of his parents.

On the stage he appeared in two Tennessee Williams plays, as Mitch in the London premiere of A Streetcar Named Desire alongside Vivien Leigh, and later as the lead in Period of Adjustment.

=== Book ===
Braden published an autobiography, The Kindness of Strangers; the title is an allusion to A Streetcar Named Desire.

=== Discography ===
- Bernard Braden Reads Stephen Leacock (1969), Capitol ST-6335
