= Barbara Kelly =

Canadian-British actress (1923–2007)

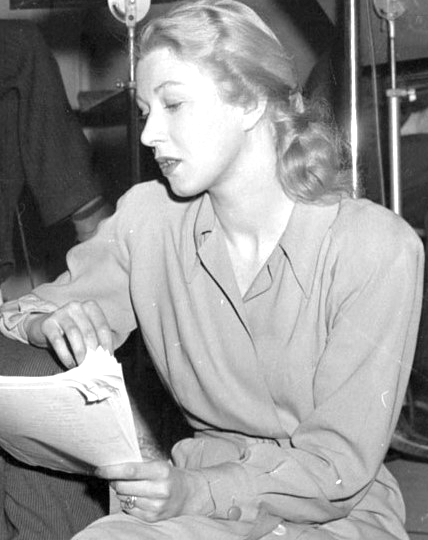
- Kelly c. 1946
- Born: 5 October 1923; Vancouver, British Columbia, Canada
- Died: 15 January 2007 (aged 83); Hampstead, London, England
- Years active: 1949–1987
- Spouse: Bernard Braden (m. 1942; died 1993)
- Children: 3, including Kim Braden

Barbara Kelly (5 October 1923 – 15 January 2007) was a Canadian-British actress, best known for her television roles in the United Kingdom opposite her husband Bernard Braden in the 1950s and 1960s, and for many appearances as a panelist on the British version of What's My Line?

== Early years ==
Barbara Kelly was born in Vancouver, British Columbia in 1923. As a child, she was given elocution lessons, and while Kelly hated the stage her mother was a frustrated actress. Kelly's first professional role was playing the Virgin Mary in a nativity play. Her father, an Irishman, was a lorry driver in Vancouver. Her mother, who was from Manchester, forced ballet classes and elocution lessons on her.

Deeply unhappy at home, in 1942 she escaped to marry the actor and broadcaster Bernard Braden, and she soon did much radio work and toured across Canada in a stage show. Kelly also made her television debut at this time, appearing in The Stage Show. In 1949, she and her husband moved to the United Kingdom with their two children. A third child, Kim, was born in November 1948 in London.

== Career ==
Kelly made regular appearances on her husband's show, Bedtime with Braden, in 1950. The next year (1951) she got equal billing with Braden in An Evening at Home with Bernard Braden and Barbara Kelly. She continued to star in her husband's shows throughout the 1950s and 1960s, and in 1968 appeared in the sitcom B-And-B, along with her husband and daughter.

In the early 1950s, Kelly appeared in a few films including The Desert Hawk, A Tale of Five Cities, Castle in the Air, and Love in Pawn. She may have been best known for her frequent appearances as a panelist on the television show What's My Line? (1951–63), transmitted by the BBC on Sunday evenings, which was very popular, although, as Kelly reflected in later years, it had no competition: "it was the only programme on the air!"

From 1964 to 1967, she introduced Criss Cross Quiz, a general knowledge game based on noughts and crosses.

Kelly was the subject of This Is Your Life in 1978 when she was surprised by Eamonn Andrews at the Tower Hotel, London.

== Braden's departure from the BBC ==
In 1972, the BBC terminated Bernard Braden's late night show, Braden's Week, replacing it with a similar programme, That's Life!, introduced by Esther Rantzen, who had worked with Braden. The reasons seem a little complicated and may have had something to do with Braden's contract to advertise margarine on ITV. However, although Braden himself was publicly circumspect about the decision, Kelly was forthright in condemning it and was plainly hostile towards Rantzen.

Almost thirty years later Kelly told Alice Pitman of The Oldie that she was "very bitter at the time, very, very bitter" and recalled that Braden's producer, Desmond Wilcox, who subsequently married Rantzen, had brought together Kelly, Rantzen and newsreader Angela Rippon for a pilot of an afternoon show, although, in Kelly's view, "it was just a front - he wanted Esther, and Angela and I were sort of left dangling".

At the turn of the 21st century, Kelly weighed into a spat in the press between Rantzen and her stepdaughter Cassandra Wilcox, as a result of which she received a large number of supportive letters from members of the public, who recalled her husband's usurpation by Rantzen. Kelly placed these in a folder marked "Hate Rancid File".

== Later years ==
After B-And-B, Kelly had few television roles although she did appear in episodes of Hawaii Five-O, Pearl, the 1977 film Lust of a Eunuch and an episode of Magnum, P.I. in 1981. In 1984 she took part in a revival of What's My Line? This ran for six years, although Kelly, who thought that the original show was never the same after the death of Gilbert Harding in 1960, felt that the revival did not match it either.

During the 1970s, the Bradens ran Adanac Productions, a company they had set up 20 years before which specialised in presentations at business conferences. After retiring from show business, Kelly established a show business agency called 'Prime Performers', which offered many actors and people from public life, including Barbara Windsor, Joan Collins, Raymond Baxter, Norman Tebbit, and Sir John Harvey-Jones, for the after-dinner speaking circuit. In 2000, Kelly founded 'Speakerpower', a company that employed broadcasters and actors such as David Jacobs and Sylvia Syms, to train corporate managers how to speak publicly.

== Death ==
Braden died in 1993, and Kelly died from cancer in 2007, aged 83, at a hospice in Hampstead, London. Their son, Christopher predeceased her, also having died from cancer.

== Selected filmography ==
- Glad Tidings (1953)
