= The Blythes Are Quoted =

Book by Lucy Maud Montgomery

- First edition
- Author: L. M. Montgomery
- Language: English
- Series: Anne of Green Gables
- Genre: Canadian literature
- Publisher: Viking Canada
- Publication date: 2009
- Publication place: Canada
- Media type: Print (hardcover)
- Pages: xiv + 527 pp.
- ISBN: 978-0-670-06391-8
- OCLC: 427676496
- Preceded by: Further Chronicles of Avonlea

The Blythes Are Quoted is a book completed by Canadian author L. M. Montgomery (1874–1942) near the end of her life but not published in its entirety until 2009. It is her eleventh book to feature Anne Shirley Blythe, who first appears in her first and best-known novel, Anne of Green Gables (1908), and then in Anne of Avonlea (1909), Chronicles of Avonlea (1912), Anne of the Island (1915), Anne's House of Dreams (1917), Rainbow Valley (1919), Further Chronicles of Avonlea (1920), Rilla of Ingleside (1921), Anne of Windy Poplars (1936), and Anne of Ingleside (1939). It consists of an experimental blend of fifteen short stories, forty-one poems, and numerous vignettes featuring Anne and members of her family discussing her poetry. The book focuses on small-town life in Glen St. Mary, Prince Edward Island, and is divided into two halves: one preceding the events of the First World War and one relating incidents after the war, up to and including the beginning of the Second World War.

== Background ==
The Blythes Are Quoted employs an unusual structure. Short stories about residents of Glen St. Mary are interspersed with vignettes of Anne Shirley Blythe and her family discussing her poetry over a series of evenings. Before or after each of these vignettes, one or more of Anne's poems (and, later in the book, the poems of her son Walter) are presented in their entirety.

The stories themselves are not primarily about Anne or her family, though Anne and her husband, Gilbert, are at least mentioned (and often quoted) by other characters in every single story. Other members of Anne's family are also discussed upon occasion. As well, Anne has a small supporting role in one story, and Gilbert similarly has a supporting role in another. Other than the connection through Anne, however, the short stories do not narratively tie in with the poems or vignettes in any way.

The short stories, most of which were originally published in periodicals throughout the 1930s, focus on characters that live in or near Glen St. Mary, the village that Anne lives in as an adult. These previously published stories initially had no connection to Anne or to Glen St. Mary, but in compiling this volume, Montgomery rewrote the stories to change the settings and include mentions and appearances of Anne and her family, mostly in incidental roles. (Montgomery had used a similar tactic some thirty years earlier in compiling the collection Chronicles of Avonlea. In that volume, previously published stories were rewritten to mention and occasionally feature characters and settings from Anne of Green Gables.) The poems, most of which were likewise published under Montgomery's name in previous years, were now attributed to Anne and to Anne's son Walter for the purposes of this collection. The only completely new material specifically composed for this volume are the brief vignettes, which consist solely of dialogue between Anne, her family, and her housekeeper, Susan Baker.

The book returns to the characters and setting that are known to readers all around the world, but there is a noticeable shift in tone and topic, given that the book frequently deals with such matters as "adultery, illegitimacy, despair, misogyny, murder, revenge, bitterness, hatred, aging, and death."

The book was delivered to Montgomery's Canadian publisher on the day of her death in 1942, but for reasons unexplained, the publisher declined to issue the book at the time. Montgomery scholar Elizabeth Rollins Epperly speculates that the book's dark tone and anti-war message (Anne speaks very bitterly of the Second World War in one passage) may have made the volume unpublishable in the midst of the patriotic fervour surrounding the ongoing war.

== Publication history ==
An abridged version of this book was published as a collection of short stories called The Road to Yesterday in 1974, more than thirty years after the original work had been submitted. The Road to Yesterday shortened and reorganized the stories (dropping one story entirely) and omitted all the vignettes and all but one of the poems. A paperback edition of The Road to Yesterday was published in both Canada and the U.S. in 1993.

On 8 April 2009, Montgomery scholar Benjamin Lefebvre announced that his edition of The Blythes Are Quoted, would be published by Viking Canada in October 2009, sixty-seven years after it had been completed. This edition contained the full text of Montgomery's final typescript and made only minimal changes to spelling and punctuation for clarity. Lefebvre also contributed an afterword to the volume, which also includes a foreword by Elizabeth Rollins Epperly. A paperback edition appeared in October 2010.

The volume has likewise appeared in translation. A Finnish edition, Annan jäähyväiset (literally Anne's Farewell), translated by Marja Helanen-Ahtola, was published by Werner Söderström Osakeyhtiö in September 2010. A Polish edition, Ania z Wyspy Ksiecia Edwarda (literally Anne of Prince Edward Island), translated by Pawel Ciemniewski, was published by Wydawnictwo Literackie in May 2011. A Japanese translation, An no Omoide no Hibi (literally Anne's Days of Remembrance), translated by Mie Muraoka, was published in two volumes by Shinchosha in October 2012.

On 7 February 2017, Lefebvre announced on the website for L. M. Montgomery Online that a new Penguin Modern Classics Edition of The Blythes Are Quoted would be published by Penguin Canada in October 2017. The publication date was first moved to January 9, 2018, and then to April 24, 2018, to coincide with the seventy-sixth anniversary of Montgomery's death on 24 April 1942; it was then published on July 3, 2018.

=== Errors ===
In the original text, Montgomery made several errors. She wrote that Anne and Gilbert only had five children, when they had six. She made character name errors such as Charlie Pye, Rosamund West, and Roy Gardiner. The editor left these in to preserve the originality of her work.

== Contents ==
=== Part 1 ===
- "The Piper" (poem by Walter Blythe)
- "Some Fools and a Saint" (short story)
- "Twilight at Ingleside" (vignette)
- "I Wish You" (poem by Anne Blythe)
- "The Old Path Round the Shore" (poem by Anne Blythe)
- "Guest Room in the Country" (poem by Anne Blythe)
- "An Afternoon with Mr. Jenkins" (short story)
- "The Second Evening" (vignette)
- "The New House" (poem by Anne Blythe)
- "Robin Vespers" (poem by Anne Blythe)
- "Night" (poem by Anne Blythe)
- "Man and Woman" (poem by Anne Blythe)
- "Retribution" (short story)
- "The Third Evening" (vignette)
- "There is a House I Love" (poem by Anne Blythe)
- "Sea Song" (poem by Anne Blythe)
- "The Twins Pretend" (short story)
- "The Fourth Evening" (vignette)
- "To a Desired Friend" (poem by Anne Blythe)
- "Fancy's Fool" (short story)
- "The Fifth Evening" (vignette)
- "Midsummer Day" (poem by Anne Blythe)
- "Remembered" (poem by Anne Blythe)
- "A Dream Comes True" (short story)
- "The Sixth Evening" (vignette)
- "Farewell to an Old Room" (poem by Anne Blythe)
- "The Haunted Room" (poem by Anne Blythe)
- "Song of Winter" (poem by Anne Blythe)
- "Penelope Struts Her Theories" (short story)
- "The Seventh Evening" (vignette)
- "Success" (poem by Anne Blythe)
- "The Gate of Dream" (poem by Anne Blythe)
- "An Old Face" (poem by Anne Blythe)
- "The Reconciliation" (short story)
- "The Cheated Child" (short story)
- "Fool's Errand" (short story)
- "The Pot and the Kettle" (short story)

=== Part 2 ===
- "Another Ingleside Twilight" (vignette)
- "Interlude" (poem by Walter Blythe)
- "Come, Let Us Go" (poem by Anne Blythe)
- "A June Day" (poem by Walter Blythe)
- "Wind of Autumn" (poem by Walter Blythe)
- "The Wild Places" (poem by Walter Blythe)
- "For Its Own Sake" (poem by Anne Blythe)
- "The Change" (poem by Anne Blythe)
- "I Know" (poem by Walter Blythe)
- "Brother Beware" (short story)
- "The Second Evening" (vignette)
- "The Wind" (poem by Anne Blythe)
- "The Bride Dreams" (poem by Anne Blythe)
- "May Song" (poem by Walter Blythe)
- "Here Comes the Bride" (short story)
- "The Third Evening" (vignette)
- "The Parting Soul" (poem by Walter and Anne Blythe)
- "My House" (poem by Walter Blythe)
- "Memories" (poem by Anne Blythe)
- "A Commonplace Woman" (short story)
- "The Fourth Evening" (vignette)
- "Canadian Twilight" (poem by Walter Blythe)
- "Oh, We Will Walk with Spring Today" (poem by Walter Blythe)
- "Grief" (poem by Anne Blythe)
- "The Room" (poem by Anne Blythe)
- "The Road to Yesterday" (short story)
- "Au Revoir" (vignette)
- "I Want" (poem by Walter Blythe)
- "The Pilgrim" (poem by Walter Blythe)
- "Spring Song" (poem by Walter Blythe)
- "The Aftermath" (poem by Walter and Anne Blythe)

== Series ==
Montgomery continued the story of Anne Shirley in a series of sequels. They are listed in the order of Anne's age in each novel.

L. M. Montgomery's books on Anne Shirley
#	Book	Date published	Anne Shirley's age
1	Anne of Green Gables	1908	11 — 16
2	Anne of Avonlea	1909	16 — 18
3	Anne of the Island	1915	18 — 22
4	Anne of Windy Poplars	1936	22 — 25
5	Anne's House of Dreams	1917	25 — 27
6	Anne of Ingleside	1939	34 — 40
7	Rainbow Valley	1919	41
8	Rilla of Ingleside	1921	49 — 53

Related books in which Anne Shirley plays a lesser part
#	Book	Date published	Anne Shirley's age
—	Chronicles of Avonlea	1912	approx. 20
—	Further Chronicles of Avonlea	1920	approx. 20
—	The Blythes Are Quoted	2009	53 — 75
