= John Mecray =

American painter (1937–2017)

John Marcy Mecray
- John Mecray in his studio 2002
- Born: February 13, 1937; Ridley Park, Pennsylvania
- Died: November 1, 2017 (aged 80); Jamestown, Rhode Island
- Known for: Painting, Publishing
- Movement: American Realism

John Marcy Mecray (February 13, 1937 – November 1, 2017) was an American realist painter best known for his marine art.

== Early life ==
He was raised in Cape May, New Jersey where family roots pre-date the 19th century. John's namesake was a Civil War soldier killed in action at Williamsburg, Virginia on May 5, 1862, and memorialized by the GAR with a ten-foot obelisk in the Cold Spring Presbyterian Cemetery, Lower Twp., New Jersey. John's grandfather, James E. Mecray, started one of the nation's first Ford agencies in Cape May in 1903.

He won a number of awards for his artwork in the Cape May public school system. In 1954 he was accepted at the Philadelphia College of Art (now the University of the Arts) where he majored in illustration under Henry Pitz and Joe Krush. After John's third year at PCA he fulfilled his military obligation and spent two and a half years in the US Army in Germany . He quickly transferred from the Second Armored Cavalry Regiment to become set and graphic designer for the Seventh Army Symphony Orchestra & Soldier Shows Company in Stuttgart. He then secured the position of illustrator for Seventh Army Headquarters' Psychological Warfare Company, designing leaflets and posters. During his two and a half years in Germany he had the opportunity to visit scores of museums throughout Europe.

After his tour of duty he returned to art college. While still in his senior year he obtained a commission to illustrate the Senior Girl Scout Handbook. He graduated in 1961, and was asked back to teach a drawing class one day a week.

== Career ==
After two years increasing freelance work brought an end to teaching. His early varied clients included Smith Kline & French Pharmaceuticals, Philadelphia Electric, the Franklin Mint, and a number of clients through Philadelphia's Bruno/Mease Studio and the N.W. Ayer Agency. He illustrated several books, mainly for the teen-age market.

Shamrock V - 1995 Artist's Proof Print by John Mecray from the painting of the same name.

Inspired by a number of offshore yacht deliveries to the Virgin Islands in the 1970s he gave up his Philadelphia-based illustration career to devote full-time to marine painting. In 1976 Mecray, his wife, young son and daughter, moved to Newport, RI where he set up a working studio on the third floor at 166 Thames Street, a block from Newport's harbor. He had purchased a weatherworn, ca. 1798, early Federal style house at 83 Division Street in Newport's 'Historic Hill' district and undertook a total restoration in addition to starting a new career.

His second painting completed in Newport in 1976/77 was the J-Class yacht Rainbow. 1977 was the year of the 23rd Defense of the America's Cup, and John's background in illustration served him well. He contacted Yachting magazine, which resulted in Rainbow being published as a two-page spread in Yachting's America's Cup Issue. That summer Ted Turner commissioned a painting of Courageous. Gary Jobson purchased the Rainbow painting and commissions from both Jobson and Turner followed over the years. In 2007 Turner commissioned another painting of Courageous, which he gifted to the New York Yacht Club on the occasion of the 30th anniversary of the Courageous's victory over the 12-metre yacht Australia in 1977.

In 1978 Mystic Seaport Museum Store became publisher of Mecray's limited edition prints. Mecray took over the publishing in 1987 and Mystic Seaport Wholesale has remained Mecray's print distributor ever since. Between 1976 and 2009, forty-six limited editions and six open editions have been published and distributed worldwide. Since 1981, Mecray's original paintings have been represented by the dealer Marguerite Riordan. She successfully presented his work to a wider audience more attuned to period American painting. Over the years she mounted several exhibits at her gallery in Stonington, CT, and she represented his work until she retired in 2008.

== Restoration Background ==
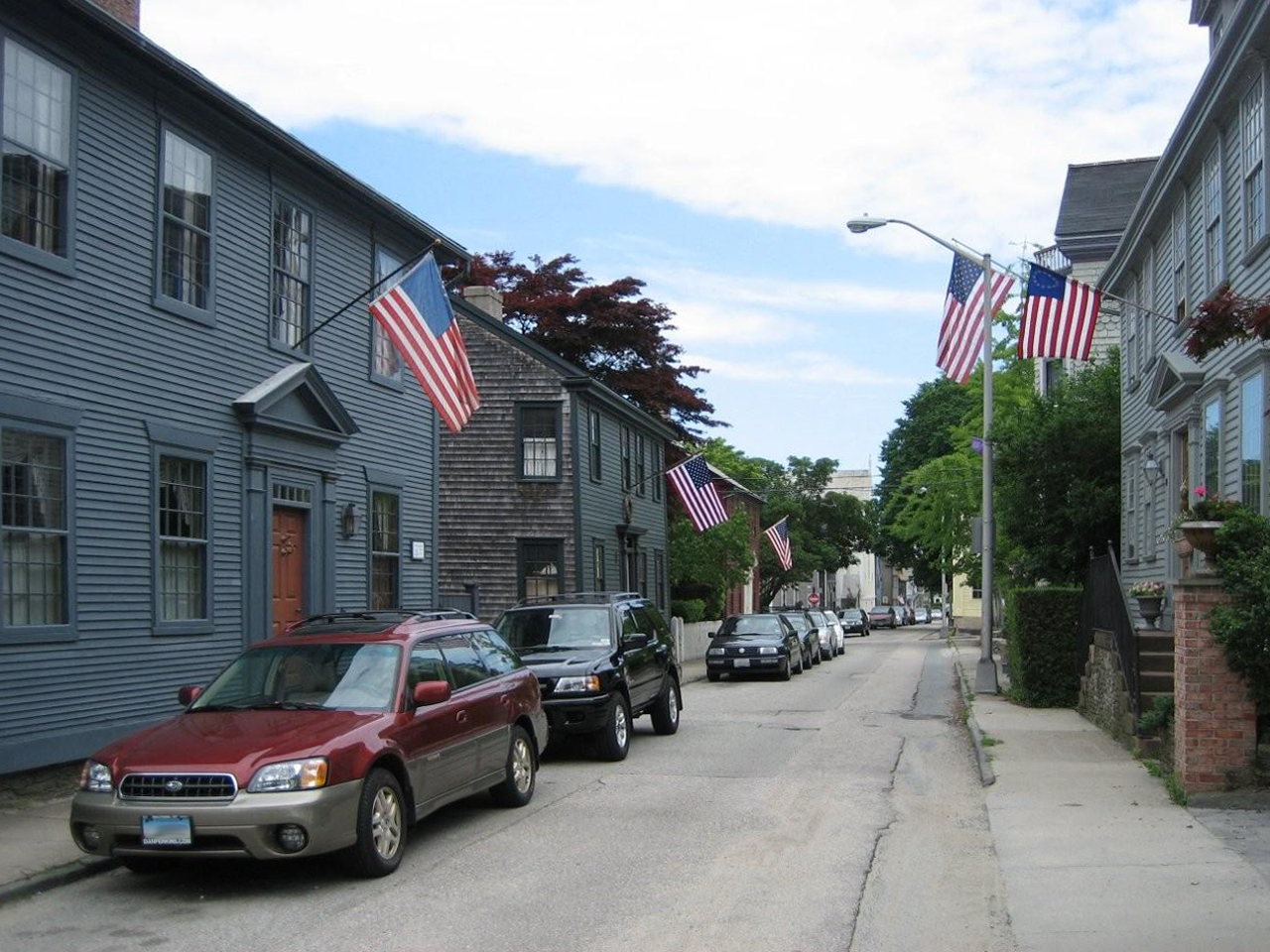
Division Street, Newport, RI 83 - restored by John Mecray - is the blue/gray house on the left.

John Mecray grew up in a restoration environment, beginning with Cape May's renaissance in the early 1950s. The restoration of that city's many Victorian houses left a lasting impression. In the 1970s Newport, RI was the epicenter for 18th century house restorations and John's Division Street Federal was one of them. More recent restorations include a 1936 race car, a 1958 sports car and a 1953 motorcycle, in addition to his involvement since its founding with the International Yacht Restoration School in Newport, RI.

== MOY & IYRS ==
In 1978 Mecray and a small group of friends met in his studio on several occasions to discuss the possibility of starting a museum. Discussions ultimately led to the founding of The Museum of Yachting in 1979. In March 1980 John convinced Tom Benson to take the position of executive director, which effectively brought the museum to life. On September 13–14 of that year the museum held its first annual Classic Yacht Regatta which is still a popular Labor Day weekend event for classic yachts.

In 1992 John resigned his trustee position with the museum to join with Elizabeth Meyer at the start of the International Yacht Restoration School. Shortly after its founding in 1993 IYRS acquired an historic waterfront site vacated by the Newport Electric Company, and within nine months one of its two buildings was rehabbed, and classes had begun. The accredited vocational school has gained recognition and respect worldwide.

In 2007 John was involved in negotiations that successfully merged the museum and the school.

== Schooner CORONET ==
In 1980 an article about the 1885 schooner yacht Coronet in WoodenBoat magazine caught the artist's eye. After visiting the yacht he explored options to see if the 133 foot schooner could be saved and restored. To this end he painted his first (1981) of three works of Coronet, then published a print using most of the proceeds to set up a museum fund to stabilize and help maintain the yacht. In 1995 the deteriorated vessel was accepted by the International Yacht Restoration School. The yacht was secured and documented in preparation for restoration. Coronet's importance has been recognized by the National Trust for Historic Preservation, and has been called America's Most Historic Yacht. Finally, in late 2008, a full restoration under the auspices of Dr. Robert McNeil, a noted restorer of classic yachts, commenced on the IYRS Waterfront campus.

== Recognition ==
On October 29, 2007, John was honored by the National Maritime Historical Society when it presented its 'Distinguished Service Award' during their Annual Awards Dinner held in the New York Yacht Club's model room on 44th Street in Manhattan.

It was an appropriate setting since John has utilized the model room on numerous occasions to sketch yacht models in preparing for a painting. The NMHS award said: "John Mecray [is] honored for using his considerable influence as America's preeminent artist of yachts and yachting to preserve our maritime heritage by working to restore the historic schooner Coronet."

John married Mary Gillette of Newport in 1995. The minister who performed the service was the Reverend Frank S. Murray, Captain for 36 years of the schooner yacht Coronet. He married the couple on the lawn of the Newport Art Museum.

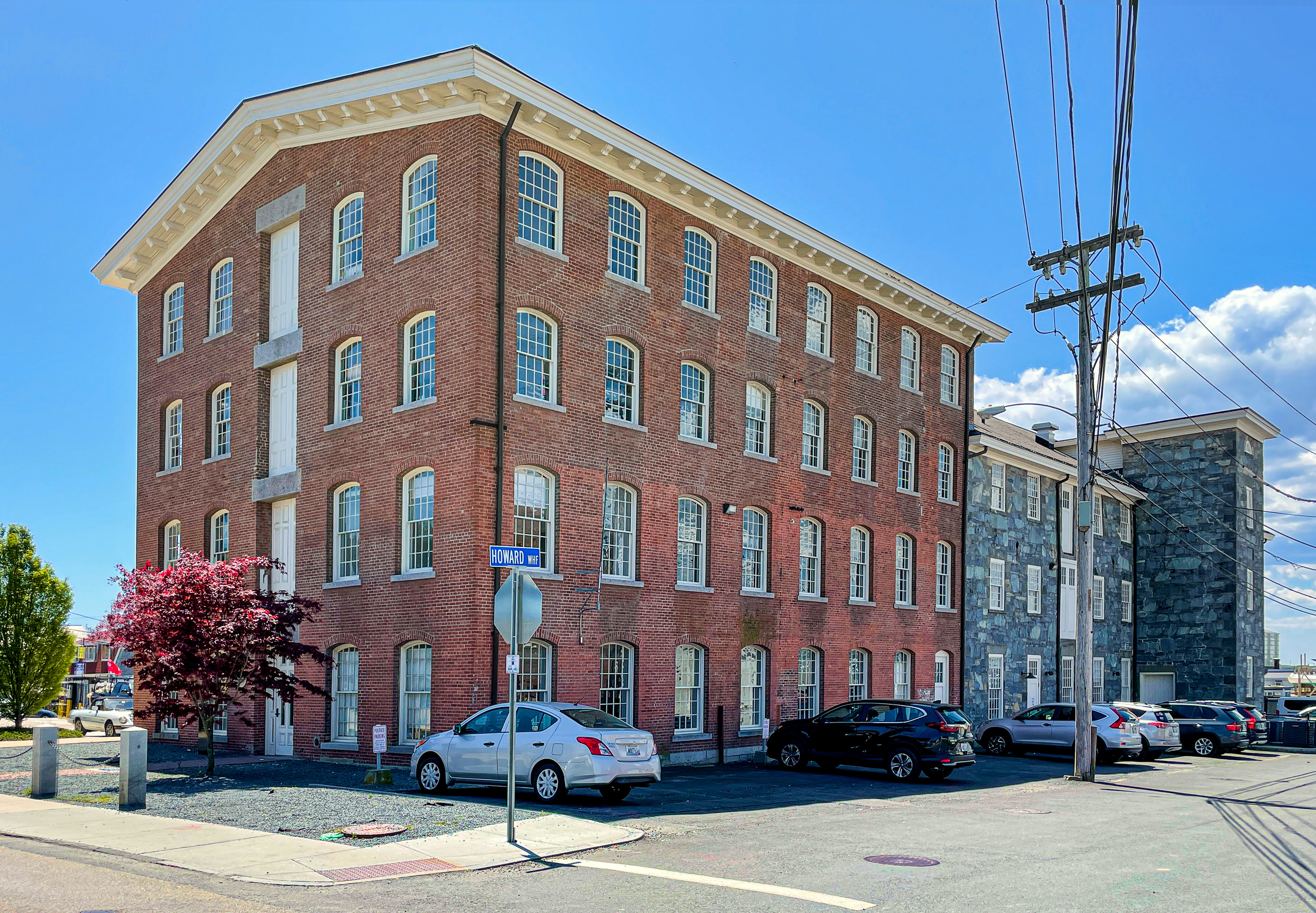
John Mecray Aquidneck Mill Building

At John's Memorial Service on Dec 1st, 2017 at the International Yacht Restoration School it was announced that the Restoration Hall would be renamed in his honor. Students also dedicated a Japanese Maple tree which will be planted in the grounds

== Death ==
Mecray was diagnosed with acute myeloid leukemia in 2015 and died November 1, 2017.
