= Pat of Silver Bush =

1933 novel by Lucy Maud Montgomery

- First edition
- Author: Lucy Maud Montgomery
- Language: English
- Genre: Children's novel
- Publisher: McClelland & Stewart (Canada); Frederick A. Stokes Company (US)
- Publication date: 1933
- Publication place: Canada
- Media type: Print (Paperback, Hardcover)
- Followed by: Mistress Pat
- Text: Pat of Silver Bush online

Pat of Silver Bush (1933) is a novel written by Canadian author Lucy Maud Montgomery, noted for her Anne of Green Gables series. The protagonist, Patricia Gardiner (called Pat), hates change of any kind and loves her home, Silver Bush, more than anything else in the world. She is very devoted to her family: her father and mother, her brothers Joe and Sid, her sisters Winnie and Rachel (who everyone in the family calls Cuddles), and the Gardiners' domestic servant Judy Plum. The book begins when Pat is 7 years old and ends when she is 18, detailing her family life and many of Judy's embellished stories.

Throughout the text, various members of Pat's family leave Silver Bush (Aunt Hazel marries, Joe runs away to become a sailor, and Winnie marries when Pat is a teenager). Pat is sustained through these losses due to her enduring love for her home. Pat insists on as little change at Silver Bush as possible, and even cries when damaged trees have to be cut down. She is "unlike other children" and chooses to have few close friends. She maintains a strong friendship with her long-time neighbor Hilary "Jingle" Gordon, a boy who lives with his frugal aunt and uncle, and Elizabeth "Bets" Wilcox, until Bets unexpectedly dies of the flu at sixteen.

During her teenage years, Pat has a number of beaus, but cannot bring herself to part with her home, and breaks off her romantic relationships at the slightest criticism of Silver Bush. She has no aspirations beyond caring for her family and Silver Bush, and is secretly glad when a near-fatal bout of scarlet fever prevents her from getting her teaching license.

Like most of Montgomery's texts, Pat is a domestic tale. Unlike Anne Shirley or Emily Starr, the only other Montgomery heroines whose stories are told in multiple texts, Pat is neither ambitious nor a writer. She also has a conventional family and home life, unlike the others, who are orphans.

The book's sequel, Mistress Pat, describes her later years, spanning over a decade.

The Pat of Silver Bush copyright in the United States was renewed in 1960.

== Characters ==
Patricia (Pat) Gardiner: The heroine of the novel. Loyal and loving, and overly sensitive to any perceived slight to her home.

Joe Gardiner: The oldest child. Joe is not interested in farming and ultimately runs off to sea.

Winnie Gardiner: The oldest girl. Winnie is a beauty. Pat has a difficult time dealing with her marriage and her leaving the family home.

Sid Gardiner: Pat's closest sibling both in age and relationship. He is interested in farming and has a childhood crush on Pat's friend Bets.

Rachel Gardiner (called "Cuddles"): The youngest child. She is born early in the novel and grows into an inquisitive child.

Aunt Hazel: Pat's beloved aunt, who marries early in the book.

Long Alec Gardiner: The father of all the Gardiner children.

Mrs. Gardiner: The mother of all the Gardiner children. Her health is never very good and is significantly affected by the birth of Cuddles.

Judy Plum: The family's live-in housekeeper who has lived at Silver Bush for years and is regarded almost as a second mother to all the children. She speaks with an Irish brogue and tells the children stories, feeds them well, and generally mothers all members of the household.

Elizabeth "Bets" Wilcox: Pat's best friend, who ultimately succumbs to the flu.

Hilary "Jingle" Gordon: A local boy who lives nearby with his not-very-loving aunt and uncle after his mother abandoned him. As they grow up together, Hilary grows to realize he loves Pat, but Pat does not believe she loves him.
