= The Selected Journals of L. M. Montgomery =

Volume 1

The Selected Journals of L. M. Montgomery, Vol. I–V, are the personal journals of famed Canadian author, Lucy Maud Montgomery (1874–1942).

Originally, Montgomery had bequeathed all of her journals and scrapbooks to her son, Dr. E. Stuart Macdonald. Macdonald held onto those journals and scrapbooks until 1981, when he donated them to the University of Guelph in Ontario, Canada. Mary Rubio, and Elizabeth Waterston, of the University of Guelph, co-edited all five volumes of these journals. Rubio and Waterston edited these volumes from 1985–2004.

== Summary ==
Until recently, Montgomery's readers had only a limited understanding of her personal life. Some surmised that Emily of New Moon was the closest to an autobiography that Montgomery's readers would ever get. Then, in 1985, the first edition of The Selected Journals of L.M. Montgomery Vol. I: 1889–1910 was published by the Oxford University Press in Canada. In 1987, Volume II: 1910–1921, and in 1992, Volume III: 1921–1929, was published. Volume IV: 1929–1935 was published in 1998, and Volume V: 1935–1942, was published in 2004.

== Publication ==
Volume	inclusive dates	ISBN (hardcover)	published	ISBN (paperback)	published
I	1889–1910	ISBN 0-19-540503-X	1985	ISBN 0-19-541512-4	2000
II	1910–1921	ISBN 0-19-540586-2	1987	ISBN 0-19-541801-8	2003
III	1921–1929	ISBN 0-19-540936-1	1992	ISBN 0-19-541802-6	2003
IV	1929–1935	ISBN 0-19-541381-4	1998	ISBN 0-19-542304-6	2005
V	1935–1942	ISBN 0-19-542116-7	2004	ISBN 0-19-542215-5	2004

== Unpublished journals ==
There are many omissions of her journal entries. Unpublished journals are archived in University of Guelph and Looking for Anne quotes from unpublished journal entries.
