= Kilmeny =

Kilmeny may refer to:

- Kilmeny (film), 1915 film
- Kilmeny, Islay, village on Islay, Argyll and Bute, Scotland
- Kilmeny (poem), James Hogg 1813, the best known part of The Queen's Wake

== Personal name ==
- Kilmeny Gordon, protagonist of Kilmeny of the Orchard, 1910 novel by Lucy Maud Montgomery
- Kilmeny Niland (1950–2009), Australian artist
