= Jane of Lantern Hill =

1937 novel by Lucy Maud Montgomery

- First edition
- Author: Lucy Maud Montgomery
- Language: English
- Genre: Children's novel
- Publisher: McClelland & Stewart (Canada); Frederick A. Stokes (US)
- Publication date: 1937
- Publication place: Canada
- Media type: Print (Paperback, Hardcover)
- Pages: 217
- OCLC: 35397190
- Text: Jane of Lantern Hill online

Jane of Lantern Hill is a novel by Canadian author L. M. Montgomery. The book was adapted into a 1990 telefilm, Lantern Hill, by Sullivan Films, the producer of the highly popular Anne of Green Gables television miniseries and the television series Road to Avonlea.

The book's United States copyright was renewed in 1965.

== Introduction ==
Montgomery began formulating the idea for the novel on May 11, 1936, began writing on August 21, and wrote the last chapter on February 3, 1937. She finished typing up the manuscript on February 25, as she could not hire a typist to do it for her. This novel was dedicated to "JL", her companion cat.

The novel was written at Montgomery's house, "Journey's End"; the environment influenced Montgomery's writing to create a positive setting for Jane in Toronto. The unusual episode in chapter 37 involving a lion was based on a similar incident Montgomery had been aware of that had occurred in Atlantic Canada several years before, which she detailed in a letter to GB MacMillan on February 23, 1938.

On April 17, 1939, she began working on a new Jane book, but the sequel was never completed.

== Plot summary ==
Jane Victoria Stuart, called Victoria by her family, lives in Toronto, Ontario, with her mother, grandmother, and aunt. Her grandmother is very strict and is jealous of anything that her daughter Robin (Jane's mother) loves. Jane does not like having to live with her grandmother and wishes she and her mother could escape, though she knows her mother will never have enough backbone to stand up to her grandmother and leave. Jane believes her father to be dead, but is eventually told he is alive and living far away on Prince Edward Island, her birthplace. Jane's only friend is Josephine Turner, Jody for short, an orphan who lives and works as a servant at the boardinghouse next door. Jane also likes to cook, but her grandmother will not allow her to practice. Jane's grandmother despises anything she considers 'common', including Jane herself.

One day, a letter from her estranged father arrives, asking that Jane stay with him for the summer on the Island. Jane is very reluctant about going, but one of her uncles says that it would be best if she went. Upon arriving at the island, Jane meets her Aunt Irene (her father's sister) and takes an instant dislike to her. The next morning, she meets her father for the first time and loves him from the start. The two buy a little house on Lantern Hill and Jane takes on the role of housekeeper. Jane soon becomes friends with all the neighbours, such as the Snowbeam family and the Jimmy Johns (so named to distinguish them from a James Garland and a John Garland who also live on the Island). Jane also gains self-possession and, upon her return to Toronto, is much less affected by her sour, disapproving grandmother.

Jane eagerly counts down the months until she can return to the Island the following summer and be reunited with her father and friends. Upon returning, she has many adventures, including finding a lion that had escaped from a circus and fearlessly locking it up in a barn. When Jody writes to say that she is about to be sent to an orphanage, Jane talks to the Titus ladies, a pair of sisters who want to adopt a child. Initially they say no, but after some consideration, they decide to adopt Jody. Upon her return to Toronto, Jane tells her the good news and Jody soon leaves for the Island, promising to see Jane in the summer. In the meantime, Jane finds out why her parents have separated. She discovers that her grandmother was against her parents' relationship from the start; when her mother returned home for a visit during a rough time in her parents' marriage, her grandmother convinced her to stay, then burned the letter Jane's father sent asking her to return home.

One day, Jane receives a letter from Aunt Irene saying that Jane's father is going to Boston, probably to get a divorce from her mother, and it is likely he will remarry. Jane is shocked by the news and sets out alone to see her father on the Island, over a thousand miles away. She uses her pocket-money to buy a train ticket, endures a sleepless journey of two days, then walks three miles from the station in the cold and wet to the house on Lantern Hill. Her father, astonished, assures her that he is not going to get a divorce or remarry; he is going to Boston to meet with publishers about a book of his that has been accepted. Jane then catches pneumonia and her father sends a telegram to her mother. Robin, ignoring her mother's command of staying in Toronto, goes to the island to be with Jane. Jane's father falls in love with her mother all over again on first sight, and when Jane awakens, her parents have reconciled. As the book ends, Jane is happily making plans for her reunited family who will spend half the year in Toronto and half on Lantern Hill.

== Reception ==
The Independent wrote "Some may find this heroine ... a little too keen on being good, too." and "Her relationship with her father, a writer whose waywardness is the opposite of the old world of her grandmother, is genuinely delightful to watch unfold."

== Adaptations ==
=== Television movies ===
1990: Lantern Hill - Directed by Kevin Sullivan. Also translated into French and Japanese. Currently available as DVD.
