= Wilmshurst =

Wilmshurst is a surname. Notable people with the surname include:

- Elizabeth Wilmshurst (born 1948), former legal adviser to the UK government.
- Ken Wilmshurst (1931–1992), English athlete.
- Rea Wilmshurst (1941–1996), editor of Lucy Maud Montgomery's short stories.
- Walter Leslie Wilmshurst (1867–1939), Freemason.

Lee Wilmshurst born 1983, Director of Steel Build Ltd
