= Mistress Pat =

1935 novel by Lucy Maud Montgomery

- First edition
- Author: Lucy Maud Montgomery
- Language: English
- Genre: Children's novel
- Publisher: McClelland & Stewart (Canada); Frederick A. Stokes Company (US)
- Publication date: 1935
- Publication place: Canada
- Media type: Print (Paperback, Hardcover)
- Preceded by: Pat of Silver Bush
- Text: Mistress Pat online

Mistress Pat (1935) is a novel written by Canadian author L. M. Montgomery, noted for her Anne of Green Gables series. Mistress Pat is the sequel to Pat of Silver Bush, and describes Patricia Gardiner's life in her twenties and early thirties, during which she remains unmarried and takes care of her beloved home, Silver Bush, on Prince Edward Island.

At twenty years old, Pat hates change as much as ever, and finds in Silver Bush a refuge where she is somewhat shielded from it, but changes happen nevertheless. In the course of eleven years, new servants, new neighbors, and new lovers come and go.

Pat's older brother, Sid, suddenly marries the loud and opinionated May Binnie after he is jilted by another woman. The Gardiners consider the Binnie family to be of a lower class, and Pat and May have had an ongoing feud since childhood. May and Sid live with the family at Silver Bush, with the equally inconsiderate Binnie family dropping in whenever they desire and making plans to take over Silver Bush. Sid and May's marriage is an extremely unhappy one, May making enemies of all her in-laws, alternately screaming, sulking, and throwing things. Pat's younger sister Rachel, aka Cuddles, demands that everyone call her Rae from now on, and leaves for college. Life at Silver Bush is no longer as pleasant as before, but Pat clings to her love of home desperately.

Pat often wonders whether anything in life, like marriage or children, could be worth leaving Silver Bush behind. Joe Gardiner returns briefly and finally marries his long-time fiancée, while Rae marries and moves to China. Donald Holmes asks Pat to marry him but she refuses, and a former beau turned widower from Pat's teen years also unsuccessfully asks for her hand. After finally deciding to visit her late friend Bets Wilcox's former home, Pat stumbles across new neighbors David and Suzanne Kirk, brother and sister. She takes solace in their easy friendship and becomes interested in David, an older widower. When he finally finds the chance to propose she accepts, contented with the thought of always watching over Silver Bush.

Unbeknownst to Pat, Rae has been sending letters to Pat's childhood friend Hilary, embellishing news of Pat's romantic conquests in hopes of making Hilary (whose boyhood love of Pat is unrequited) jealous enough to return. This has the opposite effect, and Hilary eventually stops sending any letters to Pat. Years pass, and Pat becomes comfortable with the idea of marrying David, until Hilary returns for a brief visit to Silver Bush. After Hilary leaves, David breaks the engagement and states (to Pat's protestations) that Hilary Gordon, who has been away studying architecture for ten years, is the reason he will never have Pat's affections. The Gardiner family is disappointed but unsurprised, having long ago assigned Pat to old-maidenhood.

Mrs. Gardiner's health begins to improve after many years, but Judy Plum's age begins to catch up with her. After sneaking out to milk the cows one night, Judy has a heart attack and is found unconscious the next day. One month later, Judy Plum dies, and Pat feels more alone than ever. When Silver Bush ultimately burns down due to May's negligence, Pat must resign herself to living elsewhere. May is delighted to have a new house built on the ashes of Silver Bush and makes no secret of it. The Gardiner family slowly resumes life at the Bay Shore, property inherited from Mrs. Gardiner's elderly aunt, but Pat is a shell of her former self. One night, as Pat is looking over the burned remains of Silver Bush, Hilary finally returns to the Island to claim Pat with a kiss. He reveals that Judy wrote to him of Pat's broken engagement on her deathbed and advised him to try again. Hilary, now the triumphant lover, tells Pat about the house he has built for her in Vancouver, BC.

The book's United States copyright was renewed in 1963.

== Characters ==
Patricia (Pat) Gardiner: The heroine of the novel. Loyal and loving, and overly sensitive to any perceived slight to her home. She believes nothing can ever take her away from Silver Bush and that love is something she is not suited for.

Sid Gardiner: Pat's older brother, who marries Pat's hated childhood acquaintance May Binnie, to the consternation of his family.

Rachel Gardiner (called "Cuddles" and later "Rae"): Pat's youngest sister, who attends Queen's Academy to get a teacher's licence, and continues to share Pat's room at Silver Bush until her marriage to Brook Hamilton. She and Pat are very close.

May Binnie: A local girl who Pat has never liked, but who marries Sid and moves into Silver Bush.

Long Alec Gardiner: The father of all the Gardiner children.

Mrs. Gardiner: The mother of all the Gardiner children. Her health steadily improves after an operation at the conclusion of the previous novel.

Judy Plum: The family's aging, live-in housekeeper who has been at Silver Bush for years.

Josiah Tillytuck: The family's new hired man, who fits right in at Silver Bush. He plays the fiddle and tells outrageous stories, much to the consternation of Judy Plum, though she holds him in enough affection to make him his favourite treats.

David Kirk: A widower, older than Pat, who buys the Long House (the former home of Pat's deceased best friend, Bets Wilcox) and comes to live there with his sister Suzanne. He and Pat become close friends and she enjoys his company and conversation, to the point that they become engaged, but he ultimately breaks the engagement.

Suzanne Kirk: She comes to live at the Long House to keep house for her brother David. She and Pat eventually become close friends.

Hilary "Jingle" Gordon: Pat's childhood friend, who for the majority of the novel is studying architecture at college and overseas. He loves Pat but Pat insists she feels he is like a brother to her. At the end of the novel, Pat realizes her feelings for him and they become engaged.
