= Rea Wilmshurst =

Canadian editor (1941–1996)

Rea Wilmshurst (10 August 1941 – 22 March 1996) was an editor for the author L. M. Montgomery.

She graduated from the University of Toronto with a degree in English in 1970. She went on to edit eight volumes of Lucy Maud Montgomery's previously unknown short stories and publish them through McClelland & Stewart. In 1985, she published a bibliography of Montgomery's short stories, poems, and articles.

Wilmshurst was also an editorial assistant for the projects that compiled the Collected Works of John Stuart Mill and the Collected Works of Samuel Taylor Coleridge.

She was a daughter of Mildred Rea and Harry Wilmshurst of Toronto, and granddaughter of Fred and Azilda Rea, of Reas Cigars, Toronto, Ontario, Canada.
