= The Alpine Path: The Story of My Career =

1917 autobiography by Lucy Maud Montgomery

The Alpine Path
- First book edition
- Author: Lucy Maud Montgomery
- Language: English
- Genre: Autobiography
- Publisher: University of Michigan Library
- Publication date: 1917 (magazine), 1974 (book)
- Publication place: Canada
- Media type: Print
- Pages: 104
- Text: The Alpine Path at Wikisource

The Alpine Path is an autobiography of Canadian Lucy Maud Montgomery, best known for her Anne of Green Gables series of novels. The Alpine Path was originally published as a series of autobiographical essays in the Toronto magazine Everywoman's World from June to November in 1917, and later separately published in 1974.
