= Leaskdale Manse =

Historic residence of Lucy Maud Montgomery

- Presbytère de Leaskdale
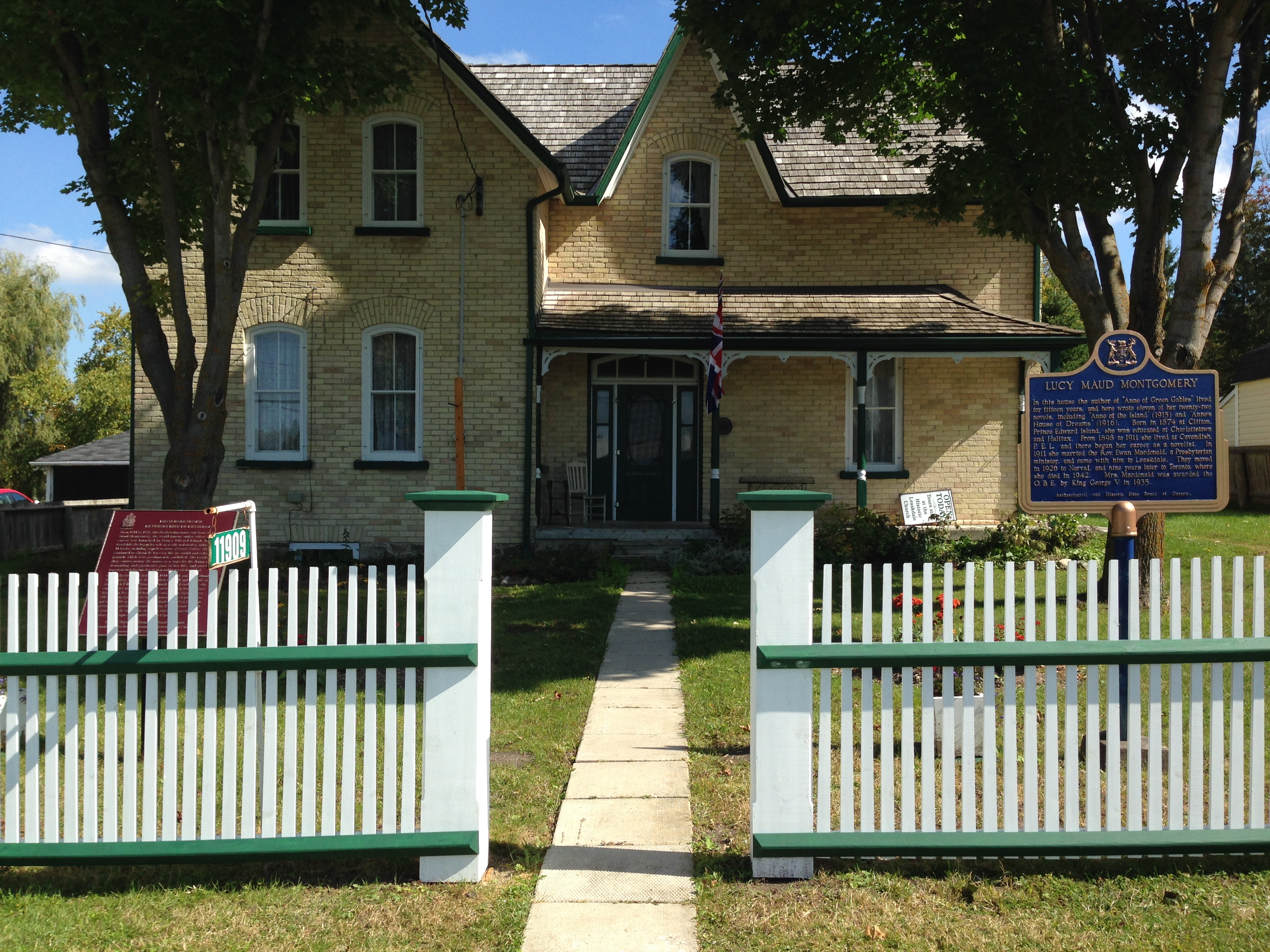
- Interactive map of Leaskdale Manse
- 44.2032°N 79.1604°W

History
- Built: 1886

Site notes
- Area: Uxbridge, Ontario, Canada
- Owner: Township of Uxbridge (1992–2013); Lucy Maud Montgomery Society of Ontario (2013–present)

National Historic Site of Canada
- Designated: 1994

The Leaskdale Manse, located in Uxbridge, Ontario, was the home of Lucy Maud Montgomery, author of the Anne of Green Gables series, and her husband Reverend Ewan Macdonald from 1911 to 1926. Montgomery wrote 11 of the 24 works published in her lifetime in the manse, as well as a series of journals that were published posthumously. The manse, constructed in 1886, was designated a National Historic Site of Canada in 1994 and is now a historic house museum.

== History ==
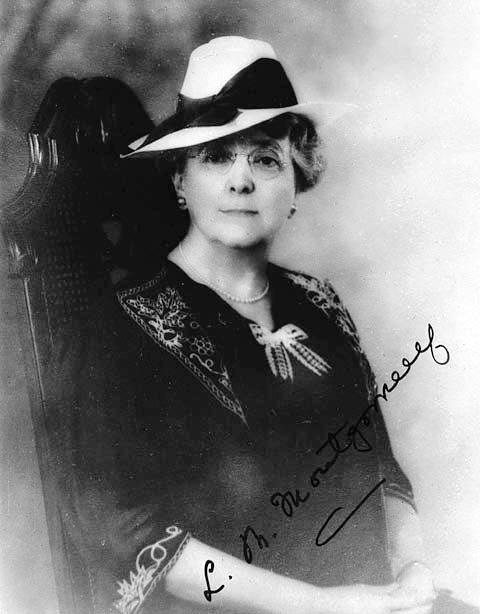
Lucy Maud Montgomery, circa 1920–1930

The manse was constructed in 1886, by carpenter William Gordon and bricklayer Valentine Brooks, to serve as a residence for the pastor of St. Paul's Presbyterian Church. In 1911, Montgomery and Macdonald, newly married, moved to the town of Leaskdale, Ontario (now part of Uxbridge). As Macdonald was the pastor of St. Paul's Church, they took up residence in the manse. In her journals, Montgomery wrote that she enjoyed the rural environment of Leaskdale, but complained of the house's "ugly" design and its lack of a bathroom and toilet.

Montgomery's three children, Chester, Hugh and Stuart, were born in the Leaskdale Manse between 1912 and 1915. Montgomery wrote 11 of the 24 works published in her lifetime in the manse, and Rainbow Valley, one of the books in the Anne of Green Gables series which tells the story of a Presbyterian minister and his children, draws heavily on Montgomery's life in Leaskdale. In her posthumously published journals, Montgomery wrote extensively of the manse and its surroundings. A 2010 restoration project used Montgomery's writings about the house's architecture and furnishings as a reference.

In 1926, the couple moved from Leaskdale to Norval, Ontario, when Macdonald became minister of two churches in Halton County. When Montgomery left the manse, she wrote of "The beautiful woods behind Mr. Leask's, the leaf-hung corner of the side road, the lovely hill field beyond with the elms on their crest. I love these things and grieve to leave them".

In 1965, the Ontario Historic Sites board commemorated the manse with a plaque. The Leaskdale Manse was designated a National Historic Site of Canada in 1994 for its significance in Lucy Maud Montgomery's life.

The Township of Uxbridge purchased the manse in 1992. In 2010, the Lucy Maud Montgomery Society of Ontario undertook a restoration project, and in 2013 they assumed ownership of the property. The manse is now operated as a museum.

== Building ==
The manse is located at 11,909 Durham Regional Road 1, north of St. Paul's Church and south of Leaskdale Creek. It is a two-storey house with a T-shaped layout, typical of middle-class residences of the time. The exterior is yellow brick; it was covered with white stucco in the 1970s, but the stucco was removed in 2001. The roof is cross-gabled, and the manse has a wooden porch decorated with simple gingerbread-style bracketing. The interior layout of the house has been preserved. Few original furnishings survive, as most were sold or donated by Montgomery's children, but the house contains some artifacts and letters from Montgomery's time in the manse. In 2010, the manse received a large donation of antique furniture from Parks Canada.
