= Mary Esther MacGregor =

Canadian author

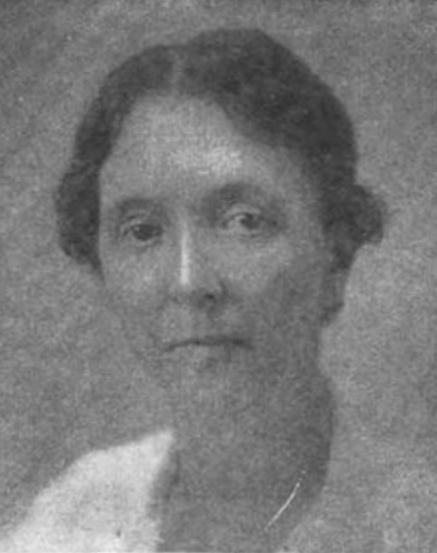
- MacGregor in 1922
- Born: August 27, 1872; Rugby, Oro Township, Simcoe, Ontario
- Died: February 10, 1961 (aged 88); Owen Sound, Ontario
- Occupation: Writer (novelist)
- Writing career
- Pen name: Marian Keith
- Period: 20th century
- Genres: History, fiction

Mary Esther Miller MacGregor (August 27, 1872 – February 10, 1961), also known as Marian Keith, was a Canadian author of fiction.

== Biography ==
MacGregor was born Mary Esther Miller in Rugby, Ontario in 1872. Her parents were John Miller, a schoolteacher, and Mary Brown Johnston. Both parents were of Scottish ancestry. She was the eldest of five children. She attended school in Edgar, Ontario, and the Orillia Collegiate Institute. She received her teacher's certificate from the Toronto Normal School in 1896. Beginning in 1899, she taught for seven years in Orillia.

She began writing in 1905. She contributed a column to Teacher’s Monthly and then worked on the editorial staff of the Presbyterian Church's Sunday School Publications. In 1906 when she tried to publish her first novel she learned that her own name was in use by another author (as Esther Miller), so she chose to write under the pen name Marian Keith. In 1909, she married Donald MacGregor, who was one of the founding members of the United Church of Canada. They moved several times to places in central Ontario to support her husband's ministerial career. She and her husband spent a fair amount of time in London, Ontario, where she wrote seven of her novels. While in London, she formed a Sunday school for girls called the Marian Keith Club.

In 1924, she wrote a book called A Gentleman Adventurer, which she based on the life of a neighbour, Thompson Smith. Canadian literary scholars have cited this as her best work. In many of her novels, MacGregor sought to portray her connection between religious thought and social conscience in order to improve life for the poor and uneducated. She also wrote about tensions produced between Scottish and Irish settlers and the effects of education and urbanization on rural society.

MacGregor authored more than a dozen novels and several biographies, including Courageous Women, which she co-authored with Lucy Maud Montgomery and Mabel Burns McKinley. MacGregor was a friend of Montgomery, who was also married to a minister. She has been grouped with Montgomery and Nellie McClung as contributors to the revival of Canadian writing by women. Her ability to capture regional attitudes and her use of social anecdotes using a style characterized by zest and humour earned her a strong local following.

She and Donald retired to a farm on Georgian Bay, but her husband was injured in a train accident and died in 1946. She spent the rest of her life living in Owen Sound, Ontario, with her sister and died there in 1961.

== Works ==
Most if not all were published as by Marian Keith.

- Duncan Polite: The Watchman of Glenoro (1906)
- The Silver Maple (1906)
- Treasure Valley (1908)
- 'Lizbeth of the Dale (1910)
- The Black-Bearded Barbarian: The Life of George Leslie Mackay of Formosa (1912) – about a Presbyterian Church of Canada missionary
- The End of the Rainbow (1913); also published as The Pot o' Gold at the End of the Rainbow (1914)
- Happy Heart Comes to Canada (1914), as Esther MacGregor, OCLC 221122846
- In Orchard Glen (1918)
- Little Miss Melody (1921)
- The Bells of St Stephen's (1922)
- A Gentleman Adventurer: A Story of the Hudson's Bay Company (1924)
- Under the Grey Olives (1927) – fictionalized account of a visit to the Holy Land
- The Forest Barrier: A Novel of Pioneer Days (1930)
- Don't Wake Me Up, When I'm Dreaming (1930)
- Courageous Women (1934), with L. M. Montgomery and Mabel Burns McKinley
- Glad Days in Galilee: A Story of the Boyhood of Jesus (1935); revised as Boy Of Nazareth (1950)
- Shining Towers: the revolving search-light flashes across the reports from home mission fields for 1935 (1936?), OCLC 71768416
- As a Watered Garden (1947)
- Yonder Shining Light (1948)
- Lilacs in the Dooryard (1952)
- The Grand Lady (1960)
