= St. Paul's Presbyterian Church (Leaskdale) =

St. Paul's Leaskdale Leaskdale, Ontario
- St. Paul's Leaskdale Leaskdale, Ontario
- 44.1622°N 79.1375°W
- Location: 12251 Regional Road 1, Leaskdale, Ontario
- Denomination: Presbyterian Church in Canada
- Website: http://www.saintpauls.ca/ St. Paul's Leaskdale

Administration
- Province: Canada
- Diocese: Presbyterian Church in Canada Diocese of Ontario
- Parish: Ontario

St. Paul's Leaskdale is a church in North Durham that serves the North GTA. The congregation is located in the community of Leaskdale, Ontario, part of Uxbridge Township, Ontario Canada. It was started in March 1862 with thirteen Charter members, as the Scott Township mission of the Canada Presbyterian Church.

The first building was opened in November 1864, on land given by George Leask.

After the Presbyterian Church in Canada was formed in 1875, the congregation was disjoined from Chalmer's in 1880. A preaching station was established in nearby Zephyr, Ontario, and they remained joined, until the Zephyr congregation disbanded and joined with St. Paul's in 1968.

In 1906, following a period of growth, the congregation built the previous structure, and paid off the building debts by 1908.

From 1910 to 1926, when both these congregations voted against (11–63 at St. Paul's) joining with Methodists and congregationalists to form the United Church of Canada, the minister was Rev. Ewan Macdonald, the husband of author Lucy Maud Montgomery. She wrote eleven of her twenty-two books as well as journals while living at the Leaskdale Manse, which was sold by the congregation in the 1990s, and is now a local museum.

The congregation has seen growth in recent years, with its proximity to the Greater Toronto Area. In 2005, permission was granted to construct a new building, complete with a large gymnasium, kitchen, offices, and school rooms. It was completed and dedicated in September 2006. The previous building is also part of the Museum complex.
