= Looking for Anne of Green Gables =

Book by Irene Gammel

- Cover of Key Porter Canada 2008 Hardcover
- Author: Irene Gammel
- Language: English
- Genre: Non-fiction
- Publication date: 2008
- Publication place: Canada
- Media type: Print (hardcover)
- ISBN: 978-1-55263-985-6

Looking for Anne of Green Gables: The Story of L. M. Montgomery and her Literary Classic is a dual biography of Anne Shirley and her creator L. M. Montgomery. Anne of Green Gables is a 1908 children's novel which has been read by over fifty million readers and translated into over thirty-five languages. The author reconstructs the development of Anne Shirley, the main character in Montgomery's novel.

The book is researched and written by biographer Irene Gammel.

== Publisher ==
- Canada: Key Porter. ISBN 978-1-55263-985-6
- US: St.Martin's Press. ISBN 978-0-312-38238-4
