= Kilmeny of the Orchard =

1910 novel by Lucy Maud Montgomery

- First edition
- Author: Lucy Maud Montgomery
- Language: English
- Genre: Romance novel
- Publication date: 1910
- Publication place: Canada
- Media type: Print (Paperback, Hardcover)
- Text: Kilmeny of the Orchard at Wikisource

Kilmeny of the Orchard is a novel by Canadian author Lucy Maud Montgomery, noted for her Anne of Green Gables series.

== Plot ==
A young man named Eric Marshall goes to teach at a school on Prince Edward Island and meets Kilmeny, a mute girl who has perfect hearing. He sees her when he is walking through an old orchard and hears her playing the violin. He visits her a number of times and gradually falls in love with her. Neil Gordon, Kilmeny’s cousin-in-law, also loves Kilmeny and hates Eric for this. When Eric proposes marriage she rejects him, even though she loves him, believing that her disability will only hinder his life if they were married, despite his protests that it would not matter at all.

Meanwhile, Eric's good friend David who is a renowned throat doctor, comes to the island and visits Eric. He examines Kilmeny, and says that nothing will cure her but an extreme psychological need to speak. Distraught, Eric wandered alone to the Connors' orchard and sat on a wooden bench. Kilmeny, deeply depressed at the time, arrived at the orchard and saw Neil Gordon swinging an axe behind Eric, poised to strike down his romantic rival. Overcome by fear, the first time in her life she screamed to warn Eric. Eric escaped, Neil fled, and Kilmeny found her voice. By the story's end, Kilmeny accepted Eric, and the two began making plans for their future marriage.

== Characters ==
- Eric Marshall: The male protagonist in the story. He is described as "one of those men regarding whom less-favoured mortals are tempted to wonder why all the gifts of fortune should be showered on one individual". His one fault seems to be extreme pragmatism. Eric lost his mother when he was ten, and has high ideals regarding a future wife.
- Kilmeny Gordon: Kilmeny is the main female protagonist, a sheltered, beautiful girl. Unfortunately, Kilmeny is mute, and expresses herself with the help of a slate and pencil, or her treasured violin. She is innocent and good-hearted, but can be very headstrong when determined. Kilmeny knows how to cook and sew, and is considered skilled at housekeeping by her aunt. She reads a great deal of books and newspapers.
- David Baker: Eric's older friend who owes David's father a debt of gratitude. He works as a throat specialist. David is very close to Eric and wishes he would get married.
- Neil Gordon: An Italian who was orphaned as a baby, Neil spent his life as an outsider. He was raised by the Gordons, and loves Kilmeny. He spent his life devoting to Kilmeny, who liked but did not love him. Neil is handsome, but he is quick-tempered and rash, and prone to violent outbursts.
- Larry West: A poor, hardworking student who used to go to school with Eric. He offers Eric a position as a teacher at a school in Lindsay, on PEI.
- Mr. Marshall, Sr.: Eric's father a "keen, shrewd, somewhat hard, although just and honest, man of business". He, like David, wishes Eric would marry.
- Mrs. Williamson: A quiet, motherly, country woman who is Eric's land-lady. Larry describes her as She-Who-Must-Be-Obeyed.
- Old Robert Williamson: Mrs. Williamson's husband, a talkative, gossipy man.
- Thomas Gordon: Kilmeny's uncle, who helped raise her after her mother's death three years back. He is well-read, and wins any argument he enters, although he becomes embarrassed for days after.
- Janet Gordon: Kilmeny's aunt, who helped raise her after her mother's death three years back. An intelligent woman. She stays in the woman's sphere, but enjoys seeing her brother bested.
- Margaret Gordon: Kilmeny's dead mother, whose stubbornness and influence last past the grave.
