= Lucy Maud Montgomery =

Canadian novelist (1874–1942)

Lucy Maud Montgomery OBE
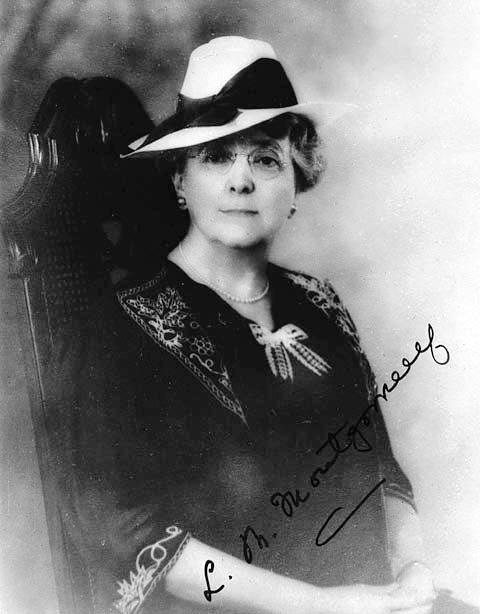
- Montgomery, c. 1935
- Born: November 30, 1874; New London, Prince Edward Island, Canada
- Died: April 24, 1942 (aged 67); Toronto, Ontario, Canada
- Education: Prince of Wales College, Dalhousie University
- Occupation: Fiction writer
- Spouse: Ewen MacDonald (m. 1911)
- Children: 3
- Writing career
- Period: 1890–1940
- Genres: Canadian literature, children's novels, short fiction, poetry
- Notable works: Anne of Green Gables; Rilla of Ingleside; Emily of New Moon

Lucy Maud Montgomery (November 30, 1874 – April 24, 1942), published as L. M. Montgomery, was a Canadian author best known for a collection of novels, essays, short stories, and poetry beginning in 1908 with Anne of Green Gables.

She published 20 novels and more than a thousand short stories and poems over the course of her career. She was also a prolific essayist. Anne of Green Gables was an immediate success; the title character, orphan Anne Shirley, made Montgomery famous in her lifetime and gave her an international following. Most of the novels were set on Prince Edward Island and those locations within Canada's smallest province became a literary landmark and popular tourist site—namely Green Gables farm, the genesis of Prince Edward Island National Park.

Montgomery's work, diaries, and letters have been read and studied by scholars and readers worldwide. The L. M. Montgomery Institute, University of Prince Edward Island, is responsible for the scholarly inquiry into the life, works, culture, and influence of Montgomery.

== Early life and education ==
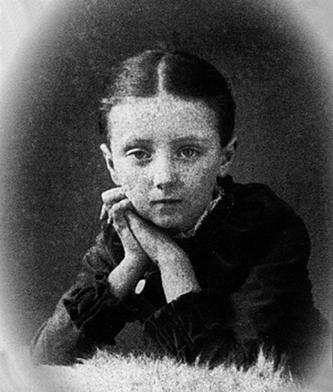
Montgomery at the age of eight

Montgomery was born in New London, Prince Edward Island, Canada, on November 30, 1874. Her mother, Clara Woolner (née Macneill) Montgomery (1853–1876), died of tuberculosis (TB) when Maud was 21 months old. Stricken with grief, her father, Hugh John Montgomery (1841–1900), placed Maud in her maternal grandparents' custody, though he remained in the vicinity. When Maud was seven, her father moved to Prince Albert, North-West Territories (now Prince Albert, Saskatchewan). From then on Maud was raised by her grandparents, Alexander Marquis Macneill and Lucy Woolner Macneill, in the community of Cavendish, Prince Edward Island.

Montgomery's early life in Cavendish was very lonely. Despite having relatives nearby, much of her childhood was spent alone. She created imaginary friends and worlds to cope with her loneliness, and Montgomery credited this time of her life with developing her creativity. Her imaginary friends were named Katie Maurice and Lucy Gray and lived in the "fairy room" behind the bookcase in the drawing room. During a church service, Montgomery asked her aunt where her dead mother was, leading her to point upwards. Montgomery saw a trap door in the church's ceiling, which led her to wonder why the minister did not just get a ladder to retrieve her mother from the church's ceiling.

In 1887, at age 13, Montgomery wrote in her diary that she had "early dreams of future fame." She submitted a poem for publication, writing, "I saw myself the wonder of my schoolmates— a little local celebrity." Upon rejection, Montgomery wrote, "Tears of disappointment would come in spite of myself, as I crept away to hide the poor crumpled manuscript in the depths of my trunk." She later wrote, "down, deep down under all the discouragement and rebuff, I knew I would 'arrive' someday."

After completing her education in Cavendish, Montgomery spent one year (1890) in Prince Albert with her father and her stepmother, Mary Ann McRae (1863–1910), who had married in 1887. While she was in Prince Albert, Montgomery's first work, a poem titled "On Cape LeForce", was published in the Charlottetown paper The Daily Patriot. She was as excited about this as she was about her return to Prince Edward Island in 1891. Before returning to Cavendish, Montgomery had another article published in the newspaper, describing her visit to a First Nations camp on the Great Plains. She often saw Blackfeet and Plains Cree in Prince Albert, writing that she saw many Indians on the Prairies who were much more handsome and attractive than those she had seen in the Maritimes.

Montgomery's return to Cavendish was a great relief to her. Her time in Prince Albert was unhappy, for she did not get along with her stepmother. According to Montgomery, her father's marriage was not a happy one.

In 1893, Montgomery attended Prince of Wales College in Charlottetown to obtain a teacher's license. She loved Prince Edward Island. During solitary walks through the peaceful island countryside, Montgomery started to experience what she called "the flash"—a moment of tranquility and clarity when she felt emotional ecstasy and was inspired by the awareness of a higher spiritual power running through nature. Montgomery's accounts of this "flash" were later given to the character Emily Byrd Starr in the Emily of New Moon trilogy, and also served as the basis for her descriptions of Anne Shirley's sense of emotional communion with nature. In 1905, Montgomery wrote in her journal, "amid the commonplaces of life, I was very near to a kingdom of ideal beauty. Between it and me hung only a thin veil. I could never quite draw it aside, but sometimes a wind fluttered it. I seemed to catch a glimpse of the enchanting realm beyond—only a glimpse—but those glimpses had always made life worthwhile." A deeply spiritual woman, Montgomery found the moments when she experienced "the flash" some of the most beautiful, moving and intense of her life.

Montgomery completed the two-year teaching program in Charlottetown in one year. In 1895 and 1896, she studied literature at Dalhousie University in Halifax, Nova Scotia.

== Writing career, romantic interests, and family life ==
=== Published books and suitors ===
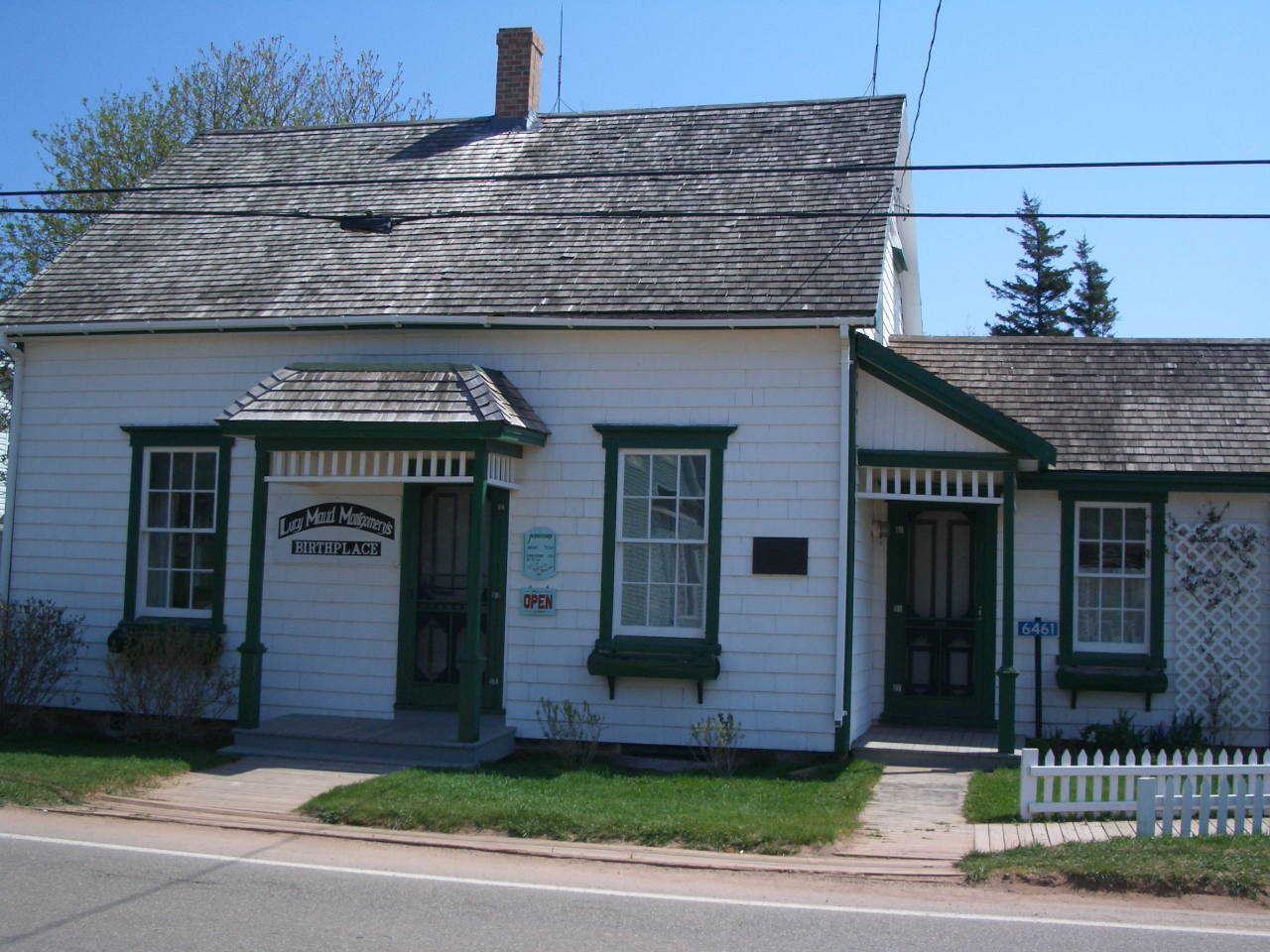
Birthplace of Lucy Maud Montgomery

Upon leaving Dalhousie, Montgomery worked as a teacher in various Prince Edward Island schools. Though she did not enjoy teaching, it afforded her time to write. Beginning in 1897, her short stories were published in magazines and newspapers. A prolific writer, Montgomery published over 100 stories between 1897 and 1907.

During her teaching years, Montgomery had numerous love interests. As a highly fashionable young woman, she had "slim, good looks" and won the attention of several young men. In 1889, Montgomery began a relationship with a Cavendish boy, Nate Lockhart. To her, the relationship was merely a humorous and witty friendship. It ended abruptly when Montgomery refused his marriage proposal.

The early 1890s brought unwelcome advances from John A. Mustard and Will Pritchard. Mustard, her teacher, quickly became her suitor; he tried to impress her with his knowledge of religious matters. His best topics of conversation were his thoughts on predestination and "other dry points of theology", which held little appeal for Montgomery. During the period when Mustard's interest became more pronounced, Montgomery found a new interest from the brother of her friend Laura Pritchard. This friendship was more amiable, but he too felt more for Montgomery than she did for him. When Pritchard sought to take their friendship further, Montgomery resisted. She refused both marriage proposals; Mustard was too narrow-minded, and she considered Pritchard merely a good chum. She ended the period of flirtation when she moved to Prince Edward Island. She and Pritchard continued to correspond for over six years, until he died of influenza in 1897.

In 1897, Montgomery received a proposal from Edwin Simpson, a student in French River near Cavendish. She wrote that she accepted his proposal out of a desire for "love and protection" and because she felt her prospects were rather poor. Montgomery came to dislike Simpson, whom she regarded as intolerably self-centred and vain to the point of feeling nauseated in his presence. While teaching in Lower Bedeque, she had a brief but passionate affair with Herman Leard, a member of the family with which she boarded. (Leard himself was engaged to neighbour Ettie Schurman while involved with Montgomery.) Of the men she loved, it was Leard she loved the most, writing in her diary:

Hermann suddenly bent his head and his lips touched my face. I cannot tell what possessed me—I seemed swayed by a power utterly beyond my control—I turned my head—our lips met in one long passionate pressure—a kiss of fire and rapture such I had never experienced or imagined. Ed's kisses at the best left me cold as ice—Hermann's sent flame through every fibre of my being.

On April 8, 1898, Montgomery wrote she had to stay faithful to Simpson: "for the sake of my self respect I must not stoop to any sort of an affair with another man". She then wrote:

If I had—or rather if I could have—kept this resolve I would have saved myself incalculable suffering. For it was but a few days later that I found myself face to face with the burning consciousness that I loved Herman Leard with a wild, passionate, unreasoning love that dominated my entire being and possessed me like a flame—a love I could neither quell nor control—a love that in its intensity seemed little short of absolute madness. Madness! Yes!

In Victorian Canada, premarital sex was rare for women, and Montgomery had been brought up in a strict Presbyterian household where she had been taught that all who "fornicated" were among the "damned" who burned in Hell forever, a message she had taken to heart. Despite this, she often invited Leard into her bedroom when everybody else was out, and though she refused to have sex with him, as she wanted to be a virgin bride, she and Leard engaged in kissing and "preliminary lovemaking". Montgomery called Leard in her diary only "a very nice, attractive young animal!", albeit one with "magnetic blue eyes".

Following objections from her family and friends that Leard was not "good enough" for her, Montgomery broke off her relationship with him. He died shortly afterwards of the flu. In 1898, after much unhappiness and disillusionment, Montgomery broke off her engagement to Simpson. She ceased to seek romantic love. Montgomery was greatly upset when she learned of Leard's death in June 1899, writing in her diary: "It is easier to think him as dead, mine, all mine in death, as he could never be in life, mine when no other women could ever lie on his heart or kiss his lips."

In 1898, Montgomery moved back to Cavendish to live with her widowed grandmother. For a nine-month period between 1901 and 1902, she worked in Halifax as a substitute proofreader for the newspapers Morning Chronicle and The Daily Echo. Montgomery was inspired to write her first books during this time. Until her grandmother's death in March 1911, Montgomery stayed in Cavendish to take care of her. This coincided with a period of considerable income from her publications.

=== Marriage and family ===
In 1908, Montgomery published her first book, Anne of Green Gables. An immediate success, it established Montgomery's career, and she wrote and published material, including numerous sequels to Anne, for the rest of her life. Anne of Green Gables was published in June 1908 and by November 1909 had gone through six printings. A sequel was published the following year. The Canadian press made much of Montgomery's roots on Prince Edward Island, which was portrayed as a charming part of Canada where the people retained old-fashioned values and everything moved at a much slower pace. The American press suggested that all of Canada was backward and slow, arguing that a book like Anne of Green Gables was only possible in a rustic country like Canada, where the people were nowhere near as advanced as in the U.S. Typical of the American coverage of Montgomery was a 1911 newspaper article in Boston, which asserted:

Recently a new and exceedingly brilliant star arose on the literacy horizon in the person of a previously unknown writer of "heart interest" stories, Miss Lucy M. Montgomery, and presently the astronomers located her in the latitude of Prince Edward Island. No one would ever imagine that such a remote and unassertive speck on the map would ever produce such a writer whose first three books should one and all be included in the "six best sellers." But it was on this unemotional island that Anne of Green Gables was born ... This story was the work of a modest young school teacher, who was doubtless as surprised as any of her neighbors when she found her sweetly simple tale of childish joys and sorrows of a diminutive red-haired girl who had made the literary hit of the season with the American public ...

Despite the success of the first two Anne novels, Montgomery did not have any desire to write more featuring the character, writing in a 1910 letter:

I have been flooded with letters entreating me to write a third Anne book ... but I feel as if I simply could not do it. The freshness has gone out of the Anne idea. It may return some day. But unless it does I shall never throw any further light on Anne's career.

Despite her feeling the story of Anne Shirley had run its course, in 1912 she would publish a short story collection set in Avonlea (with Anne featured in one), Chronicles of Avonlea, then in 1915 a third novel in the series, Anne of the Island, followed by numerous others over the remainder of her life.

In contrast to this publisher's ideal image of her, Montgomery wrote in a letter to a friend: "I am frankly in literature to make a living out of it." The British scholar Faye Hammill noted that in the books Anne is a tall girl and Montgomery was 37 at the time, which hardly made for a "young school teacher". Hammill also noted that the author of the piece chose to present Montgomery as the idealized female author, who was happiest in a domestic/rural environment and disliked fame and celebrity, which was seen at the time as conflicting with femininity. In emphasizing Montgomery's modesty and desire to remain anonymous, the author was portraying her as the ideal woman writer, who wanted to preserve her femininity by not embarking on a professional career, writing only a part-time job at best. At the same time, Hammill noted that the author was using the anachronistic French name for Prince Edward Island, to add to the picture of a romantic, mist-shrouded fantasy island where the old ways of life continued "unspoiled", just as Montgomery was portrayed as an "unspoiled" woman.

Shortly after her grandmother's death in 1911, Montgomery married Ewen (spelled in her notes and letters as "Ewan") Macdonald (1870–1943), a Presbyterian minister, and they moved to Ontario, where he had taken the position of minister of St. Paul's Presbyterian Church, Leaskdale in present-day Uxbridge Township, also affiliated with the congregation in nearby Zephyr. Montgomery wrote her next 11 books from the Leaskdale manse; she complained that it had neither a bathroom nor a toilet. The congregation later sold the structure, which is now the Leaskdale Manse National Historic Site. Macdonald was not especially intelligent, nor was he interested in literature. Montgomery wrote in her diary: "I would not want him for a lover but I hope at first that I might find a friend in him." After their marriage, they honeymooned in England and Scotland; the latter was a particular point of interest to her, as it was for her the "Old Country"—the romantic land of castles, rugged mountains, shining glens, lakes and waterfalls that was her ancestral homeland.

By contrast, Macdonald's parents had come to Canada after being evicted in the Highland Clearances, and he had no desire to visit the "Old Country". His wife had to drag him to the Isle of Skye, the home of the Clan Macdonald, where the Macdonalds had once reigned as the Lords of the Isles. The Macdonalds had been Scots-Gaelic-speaking Highlanders, while the Montgomerys and Macneils had been English-speaking Lowlanders, which might explain the differing attitudes the couple held toward Scotland, as Montgomery was more proud of her Scottish heritage than her husband. In England, Montgomery visited places associated with her favorite writers, going to the Lake District made famous by William Wordsworth, to William Shakespeare's house in Stratford-upon-Avon, and to the Haworth house in the Yorkshire moors where the Brontës (Anne, Charlotte, Emily and Branwell) had lived.

The Macdonalds had three sons; the second was stillborn. Montgomery believed it was her duty as a woman to make her marriage work, though, during a visit to Scotland, she quipped to a reporter, "Those women whom God wanted to destroy He would make into the wives of ministers." The great increase of Montgomery's writings in Leaskdale is the result of her need to escape the hardships of real life. In 1909–10, Montgomery drew upon her Scottish-Canadian heritage and her memories of her teenage years to write her 1911 novel The Story Girl. Her youth had been spent among a Scottish-Canadian family where Scottish tales, myths, and legends had often been recounted, and Montgomery used this background to create the character of 14-year-old Sara Stanley, a skilled storyteller who was an "idealized" version of her adolescent self. The character of Peter Craig in The Story Girl very much resembles Herman Leard, the great love of Montgomery's life, the man she wished she had married, but did not, right down to having curly hair. As with her relationship with Leard, the other characters object to the lower-class Craig as not being "good enough", but Felicity King chooses him anyway.

=== World War I ===
During the First World War, Montgomery, horrified by reports of the "Rape of Belgium" in 1914, was an intense supporter of the war effort, seeing the war as a crusade to save civilization, regularly writing articles urging men to volunteer for the Canadian Expeditionary Force and for people on the home front to buy victory bonds. Montgomery wrote in her diary on September 12, 1914, about the reports of the "Rape of Belgium":

But oh, there have been such hideous stories in the papers lately of their cutting off the hands of little children in Belgium. Can they be true? They have committed terrible outrages and crimes, that is too surely true, but I hope desperately that these stories of the mutilation of children are false. They harrow my soul. I walk the floor in my agony over them. I cry myself to sleep about them and wake again in the darkness to cringe with the horror of it. If it were Chester!

In Leaskdale, like everywhere else in Canada, recruiting meetings were held where ministers, such as the Reverend Macdonald, would speak of Kaiser Wilhelm II as the personification of evil, described the "Rape of Belgium" in graphic detail, and asked for young men to step up to volunteer to fight for Canada, the British Empire, and for justice, in what was described at the time as a crusade against evil. In a 1915 essay appealing for volunteers, Montgomery wrote: "I am not one of those who believe that this war will put an end to war. War is horrible, but there are things that are more horrible still, just as there are fates worse than death." Montgomery argued prior to the war that Canada had been slipping into atheism, materialism and "moral decay", and the war had brought about a welcome revival of Christianity, patriotism and moral strength as the Canadian people faced the challenge of the greatest war yet fought in history. Montgomery ended her essay by stating that women on the home front were playing a crucial role in the war effort, which led her to ask for women's suffrage. On October 7, 1915, Montgomery gave birth to her third child and was thrown into depression when she discovered she could not produce breast milk to feed her son, who was given cow's milk instead, which was a health risk in the days before pasteurization.

Montgomery identified very strongly with the Allied cause, leading her on March 10, 1916, to write in her diary: "All my misery seemed to centre around Verdun where the snow was no longer white. I seemed in my own soul to embrace all the anguish and strain of France." In the same diary entry, Montgomery wrote of a strange experience, "a great calm seemed to descend upon me and envelop me. I was at peace. The conviction seized upon me that Verdun was safe-that the Germans would not pass the grim barrier of desperate France. I was as a woman from whom some evil spirit had been driven-or can it be as a priestess of old, who out of depths of agony wins some strange foresight of the future?" Montgomery celebrated every Allied victory at her house, for instance running up the Russian flag when she heard that the Russians had captured the supposedly impregnable Ottoman city-fortress of Trebizond in April 1916. Every Allied defeat depressed her. When she heard of the fall of Kut-al-Amara, she wrote in her diary on May 1, 1916: "Kut-el-Amara has been compelled to surrender at last. We have expected it for some time, but that did not prevent us from feeling very blue over it all. It is an encouragement to the Germans and a blow to Britain's prestige. I feel too depressed tonight to do anything." Much to Montgomery's disgust, Ewen refused to preach about the war. As it went on, Maud wrote in her diary "it unsettles him and he cannot do his work properly." The Reverend Macdonald had developed doubts about the justice of the war as it went along, and had come to believe that by encouraging young men to enlist, he had sinned grievously.

Montgomery, a deeply religious woman, wrote in her diary: "I believe in a God who is good, but not omnipotent. I also believe in a principle of Evil, equal to God in power ... darkness to His light. I believe an infinite ceaseless struggle goes on between them." In a letter, Montgomery dismissed Kaiser Wilhelm II's claim that God was on the side of Germany, stating that the power responsible for the death of "little Hugh" (her stillborn son) was the same power responsible for the "Rape of Belgium", and for this reason she believed the Allies were destined to win the war. Montgomery had worked as a Sunday School teacher at her husband's church, and many of the men from Uxbridge county who were killed or wounded in the war had once been her students, causing her much emotional distress. Uxbridge county lost 21 men in the Great War from 1915, when Canadian troops first saw action at the Second Battle of Ypres, until the war's end in 1918. Montgomery's biographer Mary Henley Rubio observed: "Increasingly, the war was all that she thought of and wanted to talk about. Her journals show she was absolutely consumed by it, wracked by it, tortured by it, obsessed by it -- even addicted to it." Montgomery was sometimes annoyed if her husband did not buy a daily newspaper from the corner store because she always wanted to read the latest war news.

=== Battles with depression and the Spanish flu ===
Montgomery underwent several periods of depression while trying to cope with the duties of motherhood and church life and with her husband's attacks of religious melancholia (endogenous major depressive disorder) and deteriorating health: "For a woman who had given the world so much joy, life was mostly an unhappy one." In 1918, Montgomery was stricken with the Spanish flu. Bedridden for ten days, she almost died. The pandemic killed between 50 and 100 million people all over the world in 1918–1919. In her diary on December 1, 1918, Montgomery wrote after a visit to Toronto in November: "Toronto was then beginning to be panic stricken over the outbreak of the terrible 'Spanish flu'. The drug counters were besieged with frantic people seeking remedies and safeguards". Montgomery wrote, "I was in bed for ten days. I never felt so sick or weak in my life", going on to express thanks to God and her friends for helping her survive the ordeal. Montgomery's best friend, Frederica Campbell MacFarlane, was not so lucky and died after contracting the Spanish flu on January 20, 1919.

After the First World War, a recurring character in Montgomery's journal that was to obsess her for the rest of her life was "the Piper", who at first appeared as a heroic Highlander piper from Scotland, leading men into battle while playing traditional Highland tunes, but who turned out to be the Pied Piper of Hamelin, a trickster taking children away from their parents forever. The figure of "the Piper" reflected Montgomery's own disillusionment with World War I and her guilt at her ardent support for the war. To inspire men to volunteer for the war, a piper had marched through the centre of Leaskdale daily for all four years of World War I, playing Highland war tunes, which had given Montgomery the inspiration of the figure of "the Piper", "The Piper" first appears in the Anne books in Rainbow Valley (1919), inspiring the future grown children of Glen St. Mary with his courage. In Rilla of Ingleside (1921), "the Piper" returns as a more sinister figure, inspiring Anne's son Walter to enlist in the Canadian expeditionary force, while taking on the appearance and personality of the Pied Piper of Hamelin.

After the end of the Great War and the death of their mutual close friend, Frederica, Ewen Macdonald suffered a nervous breakdown and was never the person he had been before 1919. The Reverend Ewen Macdonald, a good Calvinist who believed in predestination, had become convinced that he was not one of "the Elect" chosen by God to go to Heaven, leading him to spend hours depressed and staring into space. The Reverend Macdonald told his wife that during his episodes of depression, he wished she and their children had never been born as they were also not of "the Elect", and all of them were going to Hell when they died as he believed that they were all predestined to be among the "damned." Macdonald refused to assist with raising the children or the housework, and was given over to erratic, reckless driving as if he was deliberately trying to get himself killed in a car crash, as perhaps he was. Montgomery herself was driven to depression by her husband's conduct, often writing that she wished she had married somebody else. Montgomery wrote in her diary that she could not stand looking at her husband's face, when he had that "horrible imbecile expression on his face" as he stared blankly into space for hours.

In February 1920, Montgomery wrote in her diary about having to deal with this:

A letter from some pathetic ten-year old in New York who implores me to send her my photo because she lies awake in her bed wondering what I look like. Well, if she had a picture of me in my old dress, wresting with the furniture this morning, "cussing" the ashes and clinkers, she would die of disillusionment. However, I shall send her a reprint of my last photo in which I sat in rapt inspiration—apparently—at my desk, with pen in my hand, in gown of lace and silk with hair so—Amen. A quite passable woman, of no kin whatever to the dusty, ash-covered Cinderella of the furnace-cellar.

For much of her life, writing was her one great solace. In 1920, Montgomery wrote in her diary a quotation from the South African writer Olive Schreiner's book The Story of an African Farm, which defined different types of love, including a "love without wisdom, sweet as life, bitter as death, lasting only a hour", leading her to write: "But it is worth having lived a whole life for that hour." (emphasis in the original). Montgomery concluded:

My love for Hermann Leard, though so incomplete, is ... a memory which I would not barter for anything save the lives of my children and the return of Frede [Frederica Campbell MacFarlane, her best friend].

Montgomery believed her spells of depression and the migraine headaches from which she suffered were both expressions of her suppressed romantic passions and Leard's ghost haunting her.

=== Publishing disputes and films ===
Starting in 1917, Montgomery was engaged in five bitter, costly, and burdensome lawsuits with Louis Coues Page, owner of the publishing house L.C. Page & Company, that continued until she finally won in 1928. Page had a well-deserved reputation as one of the most tyrannical figures in American publishing, a bully with a ferocious temper who signed his authors to exploitative contracts and in public, liked to humiliate his subordinates, including his mild-mannered younger brother George. Montgomery received 7 cents on the dollar on the sale of every one of the Anne books, instead of the 19 cents on the dollar that she was entitled to, which led her to switch publishers in 1917 when she finally discovered that Page was cheating her. When Montgomery left the firm of L.C. Page & Company, Page demanded she sign over the American rights to Anne's House of Dreams, and when she refused he cut off the royalties from the earlier Anne books. Even though he did not own the U.S. rights to Anne's House of Dreams, Page sold those rights to the disreputable publishing house of Grosset & Dunlap, as a way of creating more pressure on Montgomery to capitulate. Instead, Montgomery sued Grosset & Dunlap. Page was counting on the fact that he was a millionaire and Montgomery was not, and that the prospect of having to spend thousands in legal fees would force her to give in. Much to his surprise, she did not. Montgomery hired a lawyer in Boston and sued Page in the Massachusetts Court of Equity for illegally withholding royalties due her and for selling the U.S. rights to Anne's House of Dreams, which he did not possess.

In 1920, the house where Montgomery grew up in Cavendish was torn down by her uncle, who complained that too many tourists were coming on to the property to see the house that inspired that in which Anne was depicted as growing up. Montgomery was very sentimental about that house, and the news of its destruction caused her great pain. Between May and July 1920, Montgomery was in Boston to attend court sessions with Page, who taunted her by telling her the Anne books were still selling well, making him millions.

In 1920, Montgomery was infuriated with the 1919 film version of Anne of Green Gables for changing Anne from a Canadian to an American, writing in her diary:

It was a pretty little play well photographed, but I think if I hadn't already known it was from my book, that I would never have recognized it. The landscape and folks were 'New England', never P.E. Island ... A skunk and an American flag were introduced—both equally unknown in PE Island. I could have shrieked with rage over the latter. Such crass, blatant Yankeeism!

Reporting on the film's premiere in Los Angeles, one American journalist described Anne of Green Gables as written by a "Mr. Montgomery", who is only mentioned in passing, two-thirds of the way into the article with the major focus being on the film's star Mary Miles Minter, who was presented as the true embodiment of Anne. Montgomery disapproved of Minter's performance, writing she portrayed "a sweet, sugary heroine utterly unlike my gingery Anne" and complained about a scene in the film where Anne used a shotgun to threaten people with, writing that her Anne would never do such a thing. Montgomery had no say in either the 1919 or 1934 versions of Anne of Green Gables. The publisher, L.C. Page had acquired the film rights to the story in 1908, and as such, all of the royalties paid by Hollywood for both versions of Anne of Green Gables went to him, not Montgomery. Montgomery stopped writing about Anne in about 1920, writing in her journal that she had tired of the character. By February 1921, Montgomery estimated that she had made about $100,000 from the sales of the Anne books while declaring in her diary: "It's a pity it doesn't buy happiness." She preferred instead to create books about other young, female characters, feeling that her strength was writing about characters who were either very young or very old. Other series written by Montgomery include the "Emily" and "Pat" books, which, while successful, did not reach the same level of public acceptance as the "Anne" volumes. She also wrote a number of stand-alone novels, which were also generally successful, if not as successful as her Anne books.

On August 20, 1921, Montgomery started writing what became the novel Emily of New Moon, as she planned to replace Anne with Emily as the star of a new series of novels. The character Emily was partly autobiographical, as Emily's dream was to be a writer when she grew up. Unlike Anne, who does not have clear goals about what she wants to be when she grows up, Emily Starr knows she wants to be a writer, a characteristic she shared with Montgomery. One aspect that Emily, Anne and Montgomery all shared was "the flash"—the mystical power that Montgomery called in Emily of New Moon "the wonderful moment when the soul seemed to cast aside the bonds of the flesh and spring upward towards the stars," allowing the soul to see "behind the veil" to a transcendent beauty.

In 1925, a Massachusetts court ruled in favour of Montgomery against her publisher, Louis Coues Page, as the judge found that he had systematically cheated her out of the profits from the Anne books since 1908. Page used every conceivable excuse to avoid paying Montgomery what he owed her and, after his brother George died of a heart attack in 1927, accused Montgomery of causing his brother's death by suing him for shares of the royalties. In fact, Louis Page was not close to George, who had just left the firm of L.C. Page & Company to get away from his abrasive and arrogant brother before he died of a heart attack at age 52. In October 1928, Montgomery finally won while Page, continued to insist in public that she had caused the death of his brother, which he used as a reason why he should not have to pay Montgomery anything. Page waged a campaign of harassment against Montgomery, sending her telegrams accusing her of causing his brother's death and the subsequent mental breakdown of his widow by defeating him in court, asking her if she was pleased with what she had allegedly done. Page's behavior badly damaged his business, as no author chose to go with a publisher who had revealed himself to be both dishonest and vindictive, and after the 1920s Page's publishing house largely depended upon the reissuing older books rather than new ones as authors took their business elsewhere. On November 7, 1928, Montgomery received a cheque for the $15,000 US dollars, the amount that the auditors established Page had cheated her.

In terms of sales, both in her lifetime and since, Montgomery was the most successful Canadian author of all time, but because her books were seen as children's books and as women's books, she was often dismissed by the critics, who saw Montgomery as merely a writer for schoolgirls, and not as a serious writer. In 1924, the Maple Leaf magazine asked its readers to nominate the 14 greatest living Canadians, and all of the winners were men. Montgomery only made the runners-up, coming in at 16. However, Montgomery did make it onto another list of the 12 greatest living Canadian women. Hammill argued that Montgomery was successful at managing her fame, but the media's fixation on presenting her as the idealised woman writer, together with her desire to hide her unhappy home life with her husband, meant that her creation Anne, whose "life" was more "knowable" and easier to relate to, overshadowed her both in her lifetime and after.

=== Later life ===
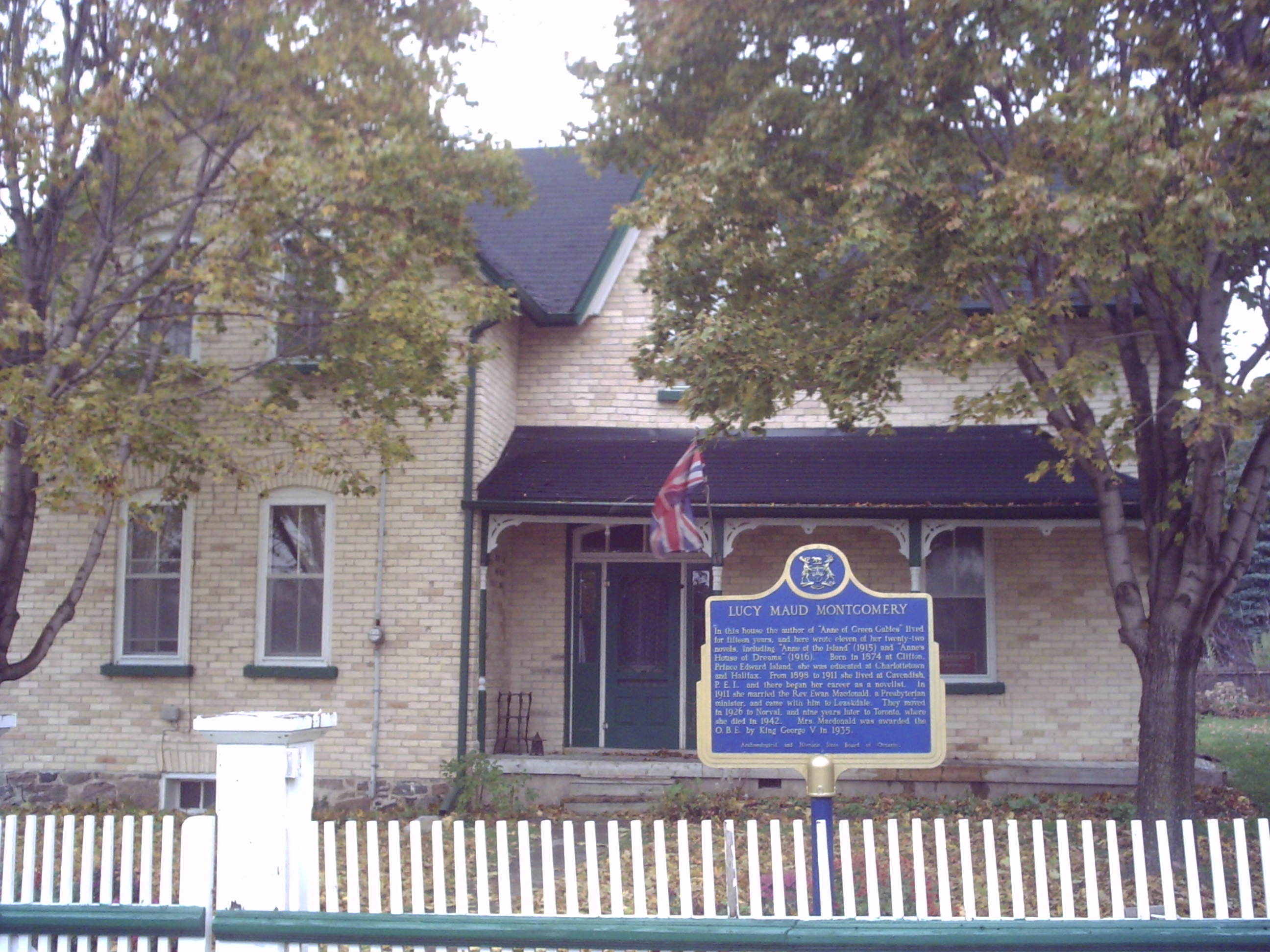
Leaskdale Manse, home of Lucy Maud Montgomery from 1911 to 1926

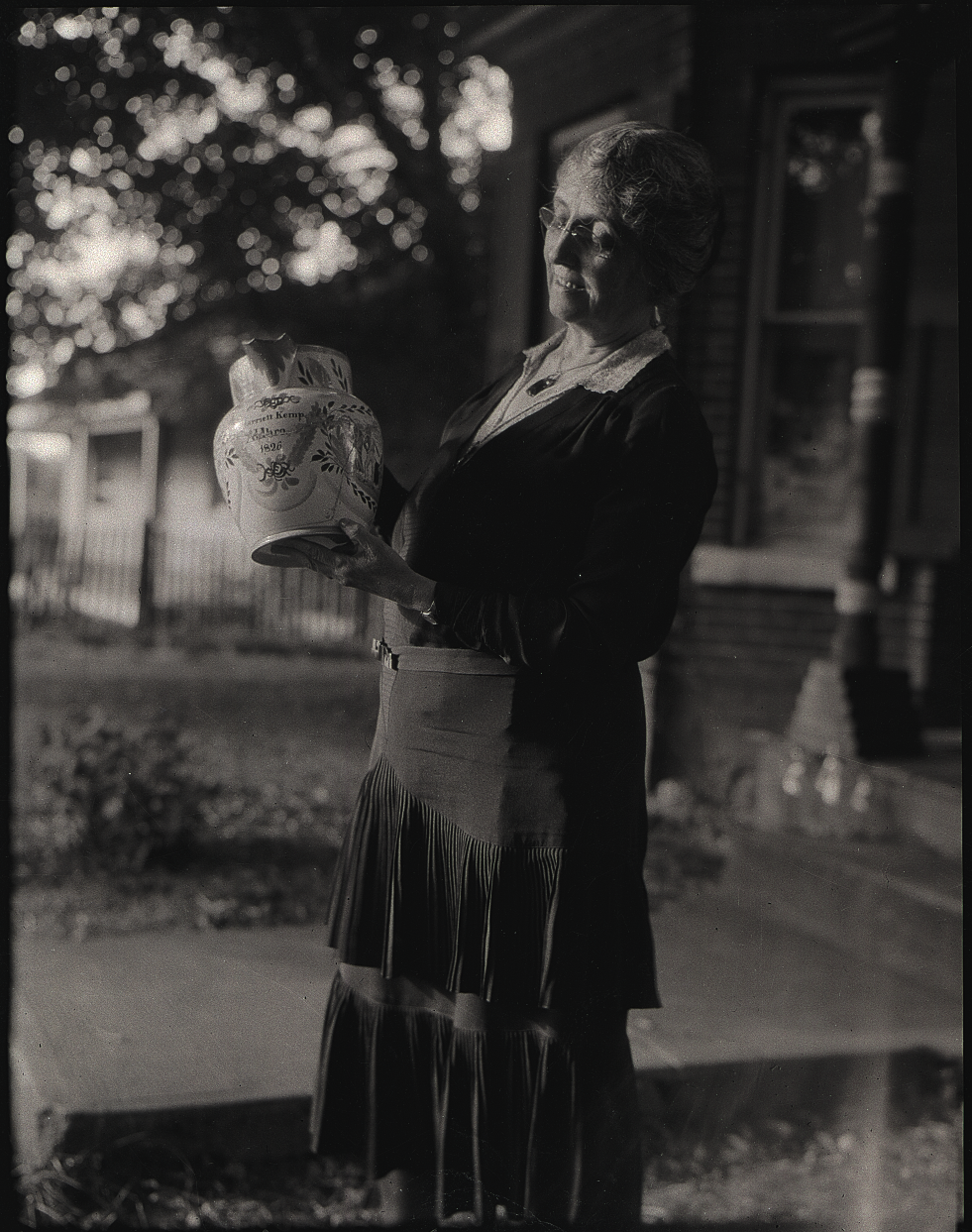
Lucy Maud Montgomery holding a jug, Norval, 1932

In 1925, Ewen Macdonald became estranged from his flock when he opposed his church's joining the United Church of Canada, and was involved in an incident where he nearly ran over a Methodist minister who was promoting the union. Montgomery, as the minister's wife, had been a prominent member of the Leaskdale community and had been a much-loved figure who organized community events. Rubio wrote the people of Leaskdale "liked" the Reverend Macdonald, but "loved" Montgomery. At the same time, she complained in her diary that her husband had a "medieval mind" when it came to women; to him: "A woman is a thing of no importance intellectually -- the plaything and servant of man -- and couldn't possibly do anything that would be worthy of a real tribute."

In 1926, the family moved into the Norval Presbyterian Charge in present-day Halton Hills, Ontario, where today the Lucy Maud Montgomery Memorial Garden can be seen from Highway 7. The Norval Presbyterian Church closed in February 2024, and is now an Indian congregation of the Oriental Orthodox faith: St. Gregorious Indian Orthodox Church, Norval Parish. In 1934, Montgomery's extremely depressed husband signed himself into a sanatorium in Guelph. After his release, a pharmacy gave Montgomery a "blue pill" intended to treat her husband's depression that was accidentally laced with insecticide (a mistake on the part of the drug store clerk) that almost killed him. The Reverend Macdonald became notably paranoid after this incident, as his mental health continued to deteriorate.

In 1933, Montgomery published Pat of Silver Bush, which reflected a move towards more "adult" stories for young people. Unlike Anne with her sense of optimism and vibrancy, Pat is a "queer" moody girl who is noted for being a "loner". Pat's best friend, Elizabeth "Bets" Wilcox, dies of the Spanish flu, giving the book a darker tone than Montgomery's previous books. In a letter to a fan in 1934 who complained about the dark mood of Pat of Silver Bush, Montgomery replied: "I gave Anne my imagination and Emily Starr my knack for scribbling; but the girl who is more myself than any other is 'Pat of Silver Bush' ... Not externally, but spiritually she is I". Pat's deep attachment to the countryside of Prince Edward Island, especially her family farm, Silver Bush, mirrored Montgomery's own attachment to the countryside of her home province, and the farm that she grew up on.

In 1935, upon her husband's retirement, Montgomery moved to Swansea, Ontario, then a suburb of Toronto (it has now been annexed into the city proper). She purchased a house that she named Journey's End, situated on Riverside Drive along the east bank of the Humber River, where she continued to write; in addition to writing other material, she returned to writing about Anne after a 15-year hiatus, filling in previously unexplored gaps in the chronology she had developed for the character. She published Anne of Windy Poplars in 1936 and Anne of Ingleside in 1939. Jane of Lantern Hill, a non-Anne novel, was also composed around this time and published in 1937. On June 3, 1935 (1935 Birthday Honours), King George V named Montgomery an Officer of the Order of the British Empire (OBE), and on September 8, 1935, at Rideau Hall in Ottawa, the ceremony of investiture into the Order was held with the Governor-General, Lord Bessborough, conducting the ceremony. As an Officer of the Order of the British Empire, Montgomery was given a special badge and ribbon, which could only be worn in public in the presence of the King or one of his representatives, such as the Governor-General of Canada. Her husband did not attend the ceremony, but Montgomery was by all accounts greatly honoured to be appointed an OBE.

Writing kept up Montgomery's spirits as she battled depression while taking various pills to improve her mood, but in public she presented a happy, smiling face, giving speeches to various professional groups all over Canada. At the Toronto Book Fair, held on November 9, 1936, to promote Canadian literature, Montgomery met the pseudo-Ojibwe author and environmentalist Grey Owl. During her speech to the assembled authors, Montgomery spoke of hearing an "owl's laughter" in Leaskdale, causing Grey Owl to jump up and interrupt her, saying: "You are the first white person I have ever met who has heard an owl's laughter. I thought nobody but Indians ever heard it. We hear it often because we are a silent race. My full name is Laughing Grey Owl." Grey Owl's remark made the front page of The Toronto Mail and Empire newspaper the next day. Montgomery described Grey Owl in her diary: "Grey Owl was looking quite the Indian of romance, with his long black braids of hair, his feather headdress and a genuine scalping knife -- at least he told us it was genuine." Montgomery liked Grey Owl's speech the same evening, stating that Canada's "greatest asset is her forest lands" and that most Canadians were too proud of "skyscrapers on Yonge Street" rather than the "natural resources we are destroying as fast as we can". After Grey Owl's death in 1938, and the revelation that the supposed Ojibwe was actually the Englishman Archie Belaney, Montgomery stated that though Belaney lied about being an Ojibwe, his concerns for the environment, nature, and animals were real, and for this reason Grey Owl's message was worth cherishing.

On November 10, 1937, Montgomery gave a speech in Toronto at another annual gathering of the Toronto Book Fair, calling for Canadian writers to write more stories about Canada, arguing that Canadians had great stories worth writing. Despite her efforts to raise the profile of Canadian literature through the Canadian Authors Association, the male avant garde of Canadian literature led by Frederick Philip Grove, F. R. Scott, Morley Callaghan and Raymond Knister complained about the mostly female membership of the CAA, whom they felt had overly glorified someone like Montgomery who was not a "serious" writer. Over time, Montgomery became addicted to bromides and barbiturates that the doctors had given her to help treat her depression.

Montgomery was greatly upset by World War II, calling the war in a 1940 letter "this nightmare that has been loosed on the world... unfair that we should have to go through it again." In her only diary entry for 1941, Montgomery wrote on July 8, 1941: "Oh God, such an end to life. Such suffering and wretchedness." On December 28, 1941, Montgomery wrote to a friend:

"This past year has been one of constant blows to me. My oldest son has made a mess of his life and his wife has left him. My husband's nerves are even worse than mine. I have kept the nature of his attacks from you for over 20 years but they have broken me at last ... I could not go out to select a book for you this year. Pardon me. I could not even write this if I had not been a hypodermic. The war situation kills me along with many other things. I expect conscription will come in and they will take my second son and then I will give up all effort to recover because I shall have nothing to live for."

In 1940, the Canadian Prime Minister William Lyon Mackenzie King introduced conscription under the National Resources Mobilization Act, but with the caveat that conscripts could only be used in the defence of North America, and only volunteers would be sent overseas, but Mackenzie King scheduled a referendum for April 27, 1942, to ask the voters to release him from his promise to only send volunteers overseas. Montgomery alluded to this in her letter mentioning "conscription will come in." In her last entry in her diary on March 23, 1942, Montgomery wrote: "Since then my life has been hell, hell, hell. My mind is gone—everything in the world I lived for has gone–the world has gone mad. I shall be driven to end my life. Oh God, forgive me. Nobody dreams of what my awful position is."

In the last year of her life, Montgomery completed what she intended to be a ninth book featuring Anne, titled The Blythes Are Quoted. It included fifteen short stories (many of which were previously published) that she revised to include Anne and her family as mainly peripheral characters; forty-one poems (most of which were previously published) that she attributed to Anne and to her son Walter, who died as a soldier in the Great War; and vignettes featuring the Blythe family members discussing the poems. The book was delivered to Montgomery's publisher on the day of her death, but for reasons unexplained, the publisher declined to issue the book at the time. Montgomery scholar Benjamin Lefebvre speculates that the book's dark tone and anti-war message (Anne speaks very bitterly of WWI in one passage) may have made the volume unsuitable to publish in the midst of the Second World War.

An abridged version of this book, which shortened and reorganized the stories and omitted all the vignettes and all but one of the poems, was published as a collection of short stories called The Road to Yesterday in 1974, more than 30 years after the original work had been submitted. A complete edition of The Blythes Are Quoted, edited by Benjamin Lefebvre, was finally published in its entirety by Viking Canada in October 2009, more than 67 years after it was composed.

== Death ==
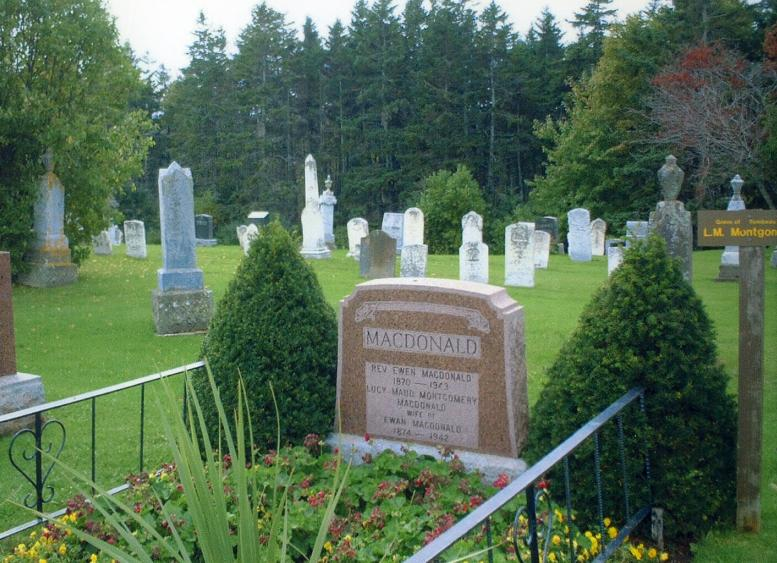
Gravestone of Lucy Maud Montgomery

On April 24, 1942, Montgomery was found dead in her bed in her Toronto home. The primary cause of death recorded on her death certificate was coronary thrombosis. However, in September 2008, her granddaughter, Kate Macdonald Butler, revealed that Montgomery suffered from depression—possibly as a result of caring for her mentally ill husband for decades—and may have ended her life through a drug overdose.

A note was found on Montgomery's bedside table, which read, in part:

... I have lost my mind by spells and I do not dare think what I may do in those spells. May God forgive me and I hope everyone else will forgive me even if they cannot understand. My position is too awful to endure and nobody realizes it. What an end to a life in which I tried always to do my best.

An alternative explanation of this document is provided in Mary Henley Rubio's 2008 biography Lucy Maud Montgomery: The Gift of Wings, which suggests that Montgomery may have intended it as an entry in part of a journal now lost, rather than a suicide note.

Montgomery was buried at the Cavendish Community Cemetery in Cavendish following her wake in the Green Gables farmhouse and funeral in the Cavendish United Church (formerly Cavendish Presbyterian Church).

During her lifetime, Montgomery had published twenty novels, over 500 short stories, an autobiography, and a book of poetry. Aware of her fame, by 1920 Montgomery began editing and recopying her journals, presenting her life as she wanted it remembered. In doing so, certain episodes were changed or omitted.

== Legacy ==
=== Posthumous short story compilations ===
Since the late 1970s - and in earnest since the publication of Akin to Anne in 1988 - dozens of Montgomery's short stories, many of which were only published once in magazine format in the early 20th century and unavailable in the decades that followed, have been compiled into a variety of themed omnibuses. Examples include Akin to Anne (stories about other orphans separate from Anne Shirley), Among the Shadows (dark tales), At the Altar (marriage-themed stories), Along the Sea (stories with a maritime theme) and a collection of Christmas-related pieces.

=== Collections ===
The L. M. Montgomery Institute, founded in 1993, at the University of Prince Edward Island, promotes scholarly inquiry into the life, works, culture, and influence of L. M. Montgomery and coordinates most of the research and conferences surrounding her work. The Montgomery Institute collection consists of novels, manuscripts, texts, letters, photographs, sound recordings and artifacts and other Montgomery ephemera.

Her major collections (including personal journals, photographs, needlework, two book manuscripts, and her personal library) are archived in the McLaughlin Library's Archival and Special Collections at the University of Guelph.

The first biography of Montgomery was The Wheel of Things: A Biography of L. M. Montgomery (1975), written by Mollie Gillen. Dr. Gillen also discovered over 40 of Montgomery's letters to her pen-friend George Boyd MacMillan in Scotland and used them as the basis for her work. Beginning in the 1980s, her complete journals, edited by Mary Rubio and Elizabeth Waterston, were published by the Oxford University Press. From 1988 to 1995, editor Rea Wilmshurst collected and published numerous short stories by Montgomery. Most of her essays, along with interviews with Montgomery, commentary on her work, and coverage of her death and funeral, appear in Benjamin Lefebvre's The L. M. Montgomery Reader, Volume 1: A Life in Print (2013).

Despite the fact that Montgomery published over twenty books, "she never felt she achieved her one 'great' book." Her readership, however, has always found her characters and stories to be among the best in fiction. Mark Twain said Montgomery's Anne was "the dearest and most moving and delightful child since the immortal Alice." Montgomery was honoured by being the first female in Canada to be named a fellow of the Royal Society of Arts and was invested Officer of the Order of the British Empire in 1935.

However, her fame was not limited to Canadian audiences. Anne of Green Gables became a success worldwide. For example, every year, thousands of Japanese tourists "make a pilgrimage to a green-gabled Victorian farmhouse in the town of Cavendish on Prince Edward Island." In 2012, the original novel Anne of Green Gables was ranked number nine among all-time best children's novels in a survey published by School Library Journal, a monthly with primarily U.S. audience. The British public ranked it number 41 among all novels in The Big Read, a 2003 BBC survey to determine the "nation's best-loved novel." The British scholar Faye Hammill observed that Montgomery as an author is overshadowed by her creation; licence plates on Prince Edward Island bear the slogan "P.E.I. Home of Anne of Green Gables" rather than "P.E.I. Birthplace of L.M Montgomery. Much to Montgomery's own annoyance, the media in both the United States and Canada tried to project the personality of Anne Shirley onto her.

=== Landmarked places ===
Montgomery's home, the Leaskdale Manse in Ontario, including the area surrounding Green Gables, and her Cavendish home on Prince Edward Island, have both been designated National Historic Sites. Montgomery herself was designated a Person of National Historic Significance by the Government of Canada in 1943.

Bala's Museum in Bala, Ontario, is a house museum established in 1992. Officially it is "Bala's Museum with Memories of Lucy Maud Montgomery", for Montgomery and her family ate their meals in the boarding house while staying at another boarding house nearby during a July 1922 holiday that inspired her novel The Blue Castle (1926). The museum hosts some events pertaining to Montgomery or her fiction, including a re-enactment of the holiday visit.

=== Honours and awards ===
Montgomery was honoured by King George V as an Officer of the Order of the British Empire (OBE) in the 1935 Birthday Honours. She also became a member of the Literary and Artistic Institute of France that same year.

Montgomery was named a National Historic Person in 1943 by the Canadian federal government. Her Ontario residence was designated a National Historic Site in 1997 (Leaskdale Manse), while the place that inspired her famous novels, Green Gables, was formally recognized as "L. M. Montgomery's Cavendish National Historic Site" in 2004.

On May 15, 1975, the Post Office Department issued a stamp to "Lucy Maud Montgomery, Anne of Green Gables" designed by Peter Swan and typographed by Bernard N. J. Reilander. The 8¢ stamps are perforated 13 and were printed by Ashton-Potter Limited.

A pair of stamps was issued in 2008 by Canada Post, marking the centennial of the publication of Montgomery's classic first novel.

The City of Toronto named a park for her (Lucy Maud Montgomery Park) and in 1983 placed a historical marker there near the house where she lived from 1935 until her death in 1942.

On November 30, 2015 (her 141st birthday), Google honoured Montgomery with a Google Doodle published in twelve countries.

The Royal Canadian Mint issued a commemorative loonie to celebrate Montgomery's 150th birthday. The coin features artwork by Brenda Jones of Montgomery and Anne Shirley, Montgomery's most famous character. The coin was unveiled June 26, 2024 and began circulation on June 27, 2024.

=== Disputes over royalties intellectual property rights ===
There have been multiple adaptations of Montgomery's work. Television producer Kevin Sullivan negotiated permission with Montgomery's heirs prior to producing the popular 1985 miniseries Anne of Green Gables, and several sequels, only to have multiple legal disputes with them. In 1999 Sullivan and his partners announced plans to make Sullivan Entertainment a publicly traded company. In their prospectus they described the works based on Montgomery's novels as profitable. Montgomery's heirs sued him, claiming he had not paid them their contracted share of royalties, claiming the films had failed to turn a profit. However, a settlement for the outstanding Anne of Green Gables lawsuit between Sullivan, the Montgomery heirs and the Anne of Green Gables Licensing Authority (AGGLA) was reached in 2006 to deal with the outstanding disagreements.

=== In popular culture ===
Alison Louder portrays Montgomery in episode 12 of season 9 "Unlucky In Love" (February 1, 2016) and in episode 3 of season 16 "The Write Stuff" (September 26, 2022) of the Canadian television period detective series Murdoch Mysteries. Writer Candace Amarante voiced L.M. Montgomery for 5 episodes of the podcast mini-series Story Girl: The Life of Lucy Maud Montgomery, produced by Knockabout Media and distributed by Acast (December 26, 2024). The manga and subsequently adapted anime Bungo Stray Dogs features Montgomery as a member of North American group the Guild. Her power Anne of Abyssal Red, is based on the Anne of Green Gables books.

== Works ==
=== Novels ===
==== Anne of Green Gables series ====
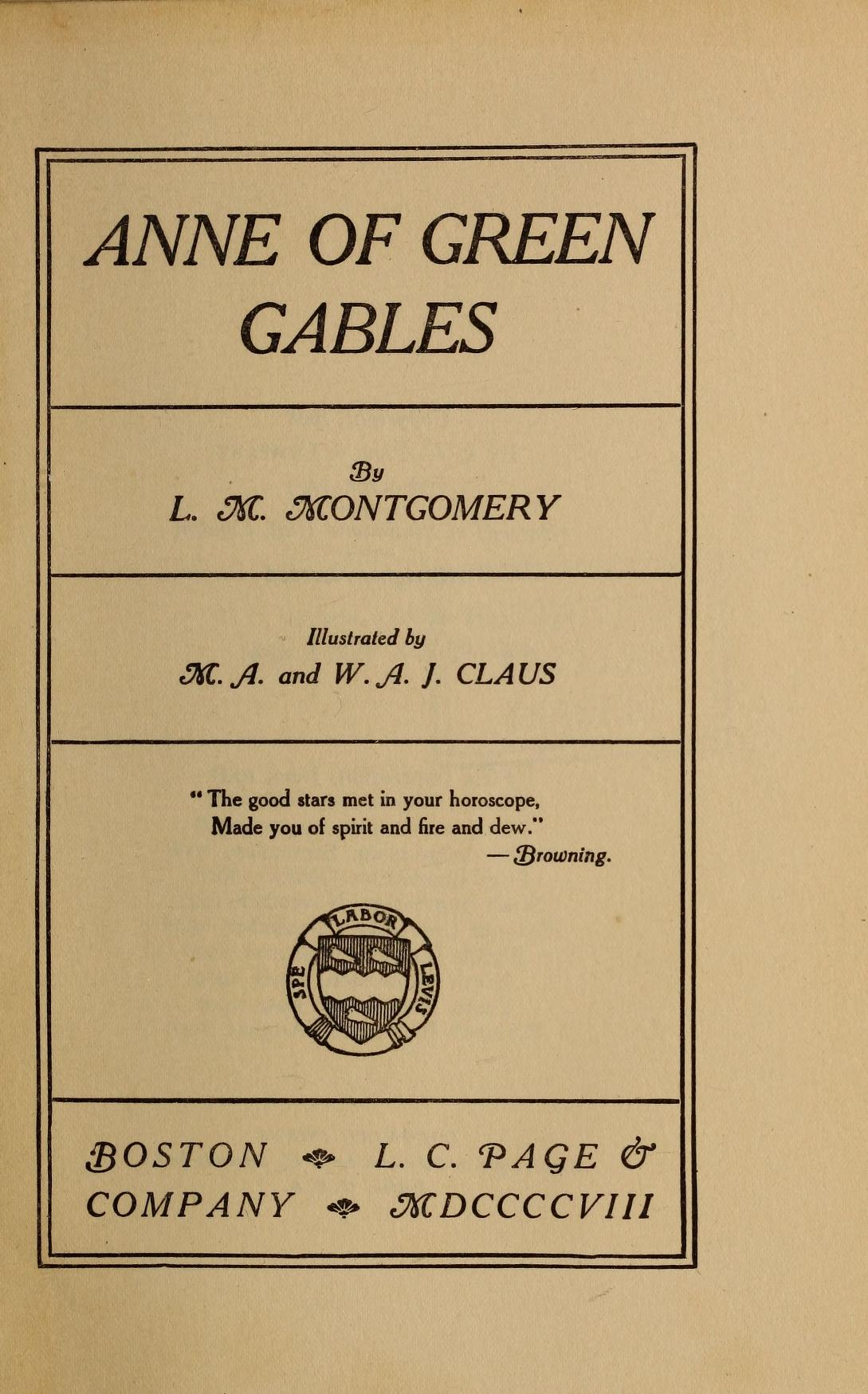
Title page of the 1908 first edition of Anne of Green Gables

1. Anne of Green Gables (1908)
2. Anne of Avonlea (1909)
3. Anne of the Island (1915)
4. Anne of Windy Poplars (1936)
5. Anne's House of Dreams (1917)
6. Anne of Ingleside (1939)
7. Rainbow Valley (1919)
8. Rilla of Ingleside (1921)
9. The Blythes Are Quoted (2009) (Note: A short story collection submitted to publisher the day of her death but not published in its entirety until sixty-seven years later; abridged version published in 1974 as The Road to Yesterday.)
- Twice Upon a Time: Selected Stories, 1898–1939 (2022)

==== Emily trilogy ====
1. Emily of New Moon (1923)
2. Emily Climbs (1925)
3. Emily's Quest (1927)

==== Pat of Silver Bush ====
1. Pat of Silver Bush (1933)
2. Mistress Pat (1935)

==== The Story Girl ====
1. The Story Girl (1911)
2. The Golden Road (1913)

==== Standalone novels ====
- Kilmeny of the Orchard (1910)
- The Blue Castle (1926)
- Magic for Marigold (1929)
- A Tangled Web (1931)
- Jane of Lantern Hill (1937)

=== Short story collections ===
- Chronicles of Avonlea (1912)
  - "The Hurrying of Ludovic"
  - "Old Lady Lloyd"
  - "Each In His Own Tongue"
  - "Little Joscelyn"
  - "The Winning of Lucinda"
  - "Old Man Shaw's Girl"
  - "Aunt Olivia's Beau"
  - "Quarantine at Alexander Abraham's"
  - "Pa Sloane's Purchase"
  - "The Courting of Prissy Strong"
  - "The Miracle at Carmody"
  - "The End of a Quarrel"
- Further Chronicles of Avonlea (1920)
  - "Aunt Cynthia's Persian Cat"
  - "The Materializing of Cecil"
  - "Her Father's Daughter"
  - "Jane's Baby"
  - "The Dream-Child"
  - "The Brother Who Failed"
  - "The Return of Hester"
  - "The Little Brown Book of Miss Emily"
  - "Sara's Way"
  - "The Son of his Mother"
  - "The Education of Betty"
  - "In Her Selfless Mood"
  - "The Conscience Case of David Bell"
  - "Only a Common Fellow"
  - "Tannis of the Flats"
- The Road to Yesterday (1974)
  - "An Afternoon With Mr. Jenkins"
  - "Retribution"
  - "The Twins Pretend"
  - "Fancy's Fool"
  - "A Dream Come True"
  - "Penelope Struts Her Theories"
  - "The Reconciliation"
  - "The Cheated Child"
  - "Fool's Errand"
  - "The Pot and the Kettle"
  - "Here Comes the Bride"
  - "Brother Beware"
  - "The Road to Yesterday"
  - "A Commonplace Woman"
- The Doctor's Sweetheart and Other Stories, selected by Catherine McLay (1979)
  - "Kismet"
  - "Emily's Husband"
  - "The Girl and the Wild Race"
  - "The Promise of Mary Ellen"
  - "The Parting of the Ways"
  - "The Doctor's Sweetheart"
  - "By Grace of Julius Caesar"
  - "Akin to Love"
  - "The Finished Story"
  - "My Lady Jane"
  - "Abel and His Great Adventure"
  - "The Garden of Spices"
  - "The Bride is Waiting"
  - "I Know a Secret"
- Akin to Anne: Tales of Other Orphans, edited by Rea Wilmshurst (1988)
  - "Charlotte's Quest"
  - "Marcella's Reward"
  - "An Invitation Given on Impulse"
  - "Freda's Adopted Grave"
  - "Ted's Afternoon Off"
  - "The Girl Who Drove the Cows"
  - "Why Not Ask Miss Price?"
  - "Jane Lavinia"
  - "The Running Away of Chester"
  - "Millicent's Double"
  - "Penelope's Party Waist"
  - "The Little Black Doll"
  - "The Fraser Scholarship"
  - "Her Own People"
  - "Miss Sally's Company"
  - "The Story of an Invitation"
  - "The Softening of Miss Cynthia"
  - "Margaret's Patient"
  - "Charlotte's Ladies"
- Along the Shore: Tales by the Sea, edited by Rea Wilmshurst (1989)
  - "The Magical Bond of the Sea"
  - "The Life-Book of Uncle Jesse"
  - "Mackereling Out in the Gulf"
  - "Fair Exchange and No Robbery"
  - "Natty of Blue Point"
  - "The Light on the Big Dipper"
  - "An Adventure on Island Rock"
  - "How Don Was Saved"
  - "A Soul That Was Not at Home"
  - "Four Winds"
  - "A Sandshore Wooing"
  - "The Unhappiness of Miss Farquhar"
  - "A Strayed Allegiance"
  - "The Waking of Helen"
  - "Young Si"
  - "A House Divided Against Itself"
- Among the Shadows: Tales from the Darker Side, edited by Rea Wilmshurst (1990)
- After Many Days: Tales of Time Passed, edited by Rea Wilmshurst (1991)
- Against the Odds: Tales of Achievement, edited by Rea Wilmshurst (1993)
- At the Altar: Matrimonial Tales, edited by Rea Wilmshurst (1994)
- Across the Miles: Tales of Correspondence, edited by Rea Wilmshurst (1995)
- Christmas with Anne and Other Holiday Stories, edited by Rea Wilmshurst (1995)
- The Blythes Are Quoted, edited by Benjamin Lefebvre (2009) (companion book to Rilla of Ingleside)
- Modern Heroines: Selected Short Stories, edited by Silvery Books (2023)

==== Short stories by chronological order ====
- Lucy Maud Montgomery Short Stories: 1896 to 1901 (2008)
  - "A Case of Trespass" (1897)
  - "A Christmas Inspiration" (1901)
  - "A Christmas Mistake" (1899)
  - "A Strayed Allegiance" (1897)
  - "An Invitation Given on Impulse" (1900)
  - "Detected by the Camera" (1897)
  - "In Spite of Myself" (1896)
  - "Kismet" (1899)
  - "Lillian's Business Venture" (1900)
  - "Miriam's Lover" (1901)
  - "Miss Calista's Peppermint Bottle" (1900)
  - "The Jest that Failed" (1901)
  - "The Pennington's Girl" (1900)
  - "The Red Room" (1898)
  - "The Setness of Theodosia" (1901)
  - "The Story of An Invitation" (1901)
  - "The Touch of Fate" (1899)
  - "The Waking of Helen" (1901)
  - "The Way of the Winning of Anne" (1899)
  - "Young Si" (1901)
- Lucy Maud Montgomery Short Stories: 1902 to 1903 (2008)
  - "A Patent Medicine Testimonial" (1903)
  - "A Sandshore Wooing" (1903)
  - "After Many Days" (1903)
  - "An Unconventional Confidence" (1903)
  - "Aunt Cyrilla's Christmas Basket" (1903)
  - "Davenport's Story" (1902)
  - "Emily's Husband" (1903)
  - "Min" (1903)
  - "Miss Cordelia's Accommodation" (1903)
  - "Ned's Stroke of Business" (1903)
  - "Our Runaway Kite" (1903)
  - "The Bride Roses" (1903)
  - "The Josephs' Christmas" (1902)
  - "The Magical Bond of the Sea" (1903)
  - "The Martyrdom of Estella" (1902)
  - "The Old Chest at Wyther Grange" (1903)
  - "The Osborne's Christmas" (1903)
  - "The Romance of Aunt Beatrice" (1902)
  - "The Running Away of Chester" (1903)
  - "The Strike at Putney" (1903)
  - "The Unhappiness of Miss Farquhar" (1903)
  - "Why Mr. Cropper Changed His Mind" (1903)
- Lucy Maud Montgomery Short Stories: 1904 (2008)
  - "A Fortunate Mistake" (1904)
  - "An Unpremeditated Ceremony" (1904)
  - "At the Bay Shore Farm" (1904)
  - "Elizabeth's Child" (1904)
  - "Freda's Adopted Grave" (1904)
  - "How Don Was Saved" (1904)
  - "Miss Madeline's Proposal" (1904)
  - "Miss Sally's Company" (1904)
  - "Mrs. March's Revenge" (1904)
  - "Nan" (1904)
  - "Natty of Blue Point" (1904)
  - "Penelope's Party Waist" (1904)
  - "The Girl and The Wild Race" (1904)
  - "The Promise of Lucy Ellen" (1904)
  - "The Pursuit of the Ideal" (1904)
  - "The Softening of Miss Cynthia" (1904)
  - "Them Notorious Pigs" (1904)
  - "Why Not Ask Miss Price?" (1904)
- Lucy Maud Montgomery Short Stories: 1905 to 1906 (2008)
  - "A Correspondence and a Climax" (1905)
  - "An Adventure on Island Rock" (1906)
  - "At Five O'Clock in the Morning" (1905)
  - "Aunt Susanna's Birthday Celebration" (1905)
  - "Bertie's New Year" (1905)
  - "Between the Hill and the Valley" (1905)
  - "Clorinda's Gifts" (1906)
  - "Cyrilla's Inspiration" (1905)
  - "Dorinda's Desperate Deed" (1906)
  - "Her Own People" (1905)
- [1905 to 1906, continued]
  - "Ida's New Year Cake" (1905)
  - "In the Old Valley" (1906)
  - "Jane Lavinia" (1906)
  - "Mackereling Out in the Gulf" (1905)
  - "Millicent's Double " (1905)
  - "The Blue North Room" (1906)
  - "The Christmas Surprise At Enderly Road" (1905)
  - "The Dissipation of Miss Ponsonby" (1906)
  - "The Falsoms' Christmas Dinner" (1906)
  - "The Fraser Scholarship" (1905)
  - "The Girl at the Gate" (1906)
  - "The Light on the Big Dipper" (1906)
  - "The Prodigal Brother" (1906)
  - "The Redemption of John Churchill" (1906)
  - "The Schoolmaster's Letter" (1905)
  - "The Story of Uncle Dick" (1906)
  - "The Understanding of Sister Sara" (1905)
  - "The Unforgotten One" (1906)
  - "The Wooing of Bessy" (1906)
  - "Their Girl Josie " (1906)
  - "When Jack and Jill Took a Hand" (1905)
- Lucy Maud Montgomery Short Stories: 1907 to 1908 (2008)
  - "A Millionaire's Proposal" (1907)
  - "A Substitute Journalist" (1907)
  - "Anna's Love Letters" (1908)
  - "Aunt Caroline's Silk Dress" (1907)
  - "Aunt Susanna's Thanksgiving Dinner" (1907)
  - "By Grace of Julius Caesar" (1908)
  - "By the Rule of Contrary" (1908)
  - "Fair Exchange and No Robbery " (1907)
  - "Four Winds" (1908)
  - "Marcella's Reward" (1907)
  - "Margaret's Patient" (1908)
  - "Matthew Insists on Puffed Sleeves" (1908)
  - "Missy's Room" (1907)
  - "Ted's Afternoon Off" (1907)
  - "The Girl Who Drove the Cows" (1908)
  - "The Doctor's Sweetheart" (1908)
  - "The End of the Young Family Feud" (1907)
  - "The Genesis of the Doughnut Club" (1907)
  - "The Growing Up of Cornelia" (1908)
  - "The Old Fellow's Letter " (1907)
  - "The Parting of the Ways" (1907)
  - "The Promissory Note" (1907)
  - "The Revolt of Mary Isabel" (1908)
  - "The Twins and a Wedding" (1908)
- Lucy Maud Montgomery Short Stories: 1909 to 1922 (2008)
  - "A Golden Wedding" (1909)
  - "A Redeeming Sacrifice" (1909)
  - "A Soul that Was Not At Home" (1915)
  - "Abel And His Great Adventure" (1917)
  - "Akin to Love" (1909)
  - "Aunt Philippa and the Men" (1915)
  - "Bessie's Doll" (1914)
  - "Charlotte's Ladies" (1911)
  - "Christmas at Red Butte " (1909)
  - "How We Went to the Wedding" (1913)
  - "Jessamine" (1909)
  - "Miss Sally's Letter" (1910)
  - "My Lady Jane" (1915)
  - "Robert Turner's Revenge" (1909)
  - "The Fillmore Elderberries" 1909)
  - "The Finished Story" (1912)
  - "The Garden of Spices" (1918)
  - "The Girl and the Photograph" (1915)
  - "The Gossip of Valley View" (1910)
  - "The Letters" (1910)
  - "The Life-Book of Uncle Jesse" (1909)
  - "The Little Black Doll" (1909)
  - "The Man on the Train" (1914)
  - "The Romance of Jedediah" (1912)
  - "The Tryst of the White Lady" (1922)
  - "The Chivers Light" (1924)
  - "Uncle Richard's New Year Dinner" (1910)
  - "White Magic" (1921)

=== Poetry ===
- The Watchman and Other Poems (1916)
- The Poetry of Lucy Maud Montgomery, selected by John Ferns and Kevin McCabe (1987)
- A World of Songs: Selected Poems, 1894-1921 (The L. M. Montgomery Library, 2019, edited by Benjamin Lefebvre)

=== Non-fiction ===
- Courageous Women (1934) (with Marian Keith and Mabel Burns McKinley)
- A Name for Herself: Selected Writings, 1891–1917 (The L. M. Montgomery Library, 2018)

=== Journals, letters, and essays ===
- The Green Gables Letters from L.M. Montgomery to Ephraim Weber, 1905–1909 (1960), edited by Wilfrid Eggleston
- The Alpine Path: The Story of My Career (1974; originally published in Everywoman's World in 1917)
- My Dear Mr. M: Letters to G.B. MacMillan from L.M. Montgomery (1980), edited by Francis W.P. Bolger and Elizabeth R. Epperly
- The Selected Journals of L. M. Montgomery (5 vols., 1985–2004), edited by Mary Rubio and Elizabeth Waterston
- The Complete Journals of L.M. Montgomery: The PEI Years, 1889–1900 (2012), edited by Mary Henley Rubio and Elizabeth Hillman Waterston
- The Complete Journals of L.M. Montgomery: The PEI Years, 1901–1911 (2013), edited by Mary Henley Rubio and Elizabeth Hillman Waterston
- The L.M. Montgomery Reader, Volume 1: A Life in Print (2013), edited by Benjamin Lefebvre
- L.M. Montgomery's Complete Journals: The Ontario Years, 1911–1917 (2016), edited by Jen Rubio
- L.M. Montgomery's Complete Journals: The Ontario Years, 1918–1921 (2017), edited by Jen Rubio
- L.M. Montgomery's Complete Journals: The Ontario Years, 1922–1925 (2018), with a preface by Jen Rubio
- L.M. Montgomery's Complete Journals: The Ontario Years, 1926–1929 (2017), edited by Jen Rubio
- L.M. Montgomery's Complete Journals: The Ontario Years, 1930–1933 (2019), edited by Jen Rubio

== Bilingual editions ==
- Diese verdammten Sauen / Them Notorious Pigs. Calambac Publishing House, Germany 2023, bilingual edition: English/German, ISBN 978-3-943117-24-0.

== Notes and references ==
=== Bibliography ===
- Bourgoin, Suzanne Michelle, ed. (1998). "Lucy Maud Montgomery". Encyclopedia of World Biography. Vol. 11 (Michael-Orleans) (2nd ed.). Detroit: Gale Research. ISBN 978-0-7876-2221-3.
- Brennan, Joseph Gerard (Spring 1995). "The Story of a Classic: Anne and After". The American Scholar. 64 (2): 247–256.
- Hammill, Faye (July 2006). "'A new and exceedingly brilliant star': L. M. Montgomery, "Anne of Green Gables," and Mary Miles Minter". The Modern Language Review. 101 (3): 652–670. doi:10.2307/20466900. JSTOR 20466900. S2CID 162423448.
- Heilbron, Alexandra (2001). Remembering Lucy Maud Montgomery. Toronto: Dundurn Press. ISBN 1-55002-362-4.
- Gammel, Irene (2008), Looking for Anne of Green Gables: The Story of L.M. Montgomery and Her Literary Classic, New York: St. Martin's Press, ISBN 978-0-312-38237-7
- Kannas, Vappu (2015). "The Forlorn Heroine of a Terribly Sad Life Story": Romance in the Journals of L. M. Montgomery. University of Helsinki. ISBN 978-951-51-1772-4.
- McLeod, Carol (1983). Legendary Canadian Women. Hantsport, Nova Scotia: Lancelot Press.
- Rubio, Mary (2008), Lucy Maud Montgomery: the gift of wings, Toronto: Doubleday Canada, ISBN 978-0-385-65983-3
- Rubio, Mary; Waterston, Elizabeth (1987), The Selected Journals of L. M. Montgomery Volume II: 1910-1921, Oxford: Oxford University Press, ISBN 9-780195-405866
- Rubio, Mary; Waterston, Elizabeth (2004), The Selected Journals of L. M. Montgomery Volume V: 1935-1942, Oxford: Oxford University Press, ISBN 9-780195-405866
- Rubio, Mary; Waterston, Elizabeth (1995), Writing a Life: L. M. Montgomery (PDF), Toronto: ECW Press, ISBN 9781550222203, archived from the original (PDF) on October 2, 2011
- Waterston, Elizabeth (2008), Magic Island: The Fictions of L. M. Montgomery, Oxford: Oxford University Press, ISBN 978-0-19-543003-5
- L. M. Montgomery's Rainbow Valleys: The Ontario Years, 1911–1942. Edited by Rita Bode and Lesley D. Clement (2015). McGill-Queen's University Press
