= List of Etobicoke School of the Arts people =

This is a list of notable people and alumni associated with Etobicoke School of the Arts.

== Acting ==
- Brittany Allen, actress, All My Children
- Ella Ballentine, actress Standoff, The Monster, L.M. Montgomery's Anne of Green Gables, Black Conflux,
- Devon Bostick, actor, Adoration, Diary of a Wimpy Kid, Oppenheimer, The 100, Saw VI
- Nazneen Contractor, actress, The Border, 24
- Robin Dunne, actor, Sanctuary
- Robbie G.K., actor, Overcompensating and Heated Rivalry
- Neil Hope, actor, Degrassi Junior High and Degrassi High
- Kate Kelton, actress, Harold and Kumar go to White Castle, Haven
- Mike Lobel, regular on Degrassi: The Next Generation
- Hannah Lochner, actress, Dawn of the Dead, Wingin' It
- Marnie McPhail, actress in The Edison Twins and Stir of Echoes: The Homecoming
- Ramona Milano, actress in Due South and Degrassi: The Next Generation
- Phillip Nozuka, actor, appeared on Degrassi: The Next Generation
- Aislinn Paul, actress, Degrassi
- Sebastian Pigott, actor, Being Erica, Saw 3D
- Keanu Reeves, actor (expelled from ESA)
- Noah Reid, actor, Schitt's Creek, Franklin
- Chloe Rose, actress, Degrassi: The Next Generation
- Michael Seater, actor, Life with Derek, and director, Sadie's Last Days on Earth, People Hold On
- Amanda Stepto, actress, Degrassi Junior High, Degrassi High, and Degrassi: The Next Generation
- Michael Therriault, theatre actor
- Sophie Traub, actress, Daltry Calhoun, The Interpreter, Tenderness
- Asia Vieira, actress, Omen IV: The Awakening, The Adventures of Dudley the Dragon

== Visual arts and culture ==
- Kara Stone, video game designer and artist
- Scott Treleaven, artist and filmmaker
- Brooke Lynn Hytes, drag queen and host of Canada's Drag Race
- Syrus Marcus Ware, artist, activist and scholar. Co-founder of Black Lives Matter - Canada

== Film ==
- Chris Di Staulo, film director
- Daniel Roher, film director and Oscar winner

== Literature ==
- Ibi Kaslik, author

== Music ==
- Adrian Anantawan, violinist
- Allie X, singer
- Taylor Brook, musician-composer
- Marlon Chaplin, multi-instrumentalist musician, singer-songwriter
- Kevin Drew, member of the band Broken Social Scene
- Andre Ethier, musician-songwriter, formerly of The Deadly Snakes
- Emily Haines, lead singer of Metric
- Barbara Hannigan, soprano and conductor
- Lisa Lougheed, recording artist and session singer
- Amy Millan, singer and guitarist in Stars
- Taylor Mitchell (1990–2009), country folk singer
- George Nozuka, R&B singer, has toured with Backstreet Boys
- Justin Nozuka, singer-songwriter
- Rob Wells, music producer and songwriter

== Politics ==
- Suze Morrison, Member of Provincial Parliament of Ontario for Toronto Centre
