= 2017 Fangoria Chainsaw Awards =

Annual US horror film awards ceremony

24th Fangoria Chainsaw Awards
- Presented by: Fangoria
- Announced on: February 7, 2017

Highlights
- Most nominations: Green Room, The Witch, The Invitation (film, 4); Ash vs Evil Dead (television, 5)

The Fangoria Chainsaw Awards are an award ceremony that goes out to horror films and thriller films. Beginning in 1992 the awards were expanded and an annual ceremony was inaugurated to give out the awards. The nominees were announced in February 2017 and the winners are to be announced in late April. "The winners are followed by the runners-up."

== Winners and nominees ==
Best Wide Release	Best Limited Release
The Witch − Directed by Robert Eggers; Green Room − Directed by Jeremy Saulnier; 10 Cloverfield Lane − Directed by Dan Trachtenberg; Don't Breathe − Directed by Fede Álvarez; Ouija: Origin of Evil − Directed by Mike Flanagan	The Autopsy of Jane Doe − Directed by André Øvredal; The Eyes of My Mother − Directed by Nicolas Pesce; Hush − Directed by Mike Flanagan; I Am Not a Serial Killer − Directed by Billy O'Brien; The Invitation − Directed by Karyn Kusama
Best Actor	Best Actress
John Goodman − 10 Cloverfield Lane as Howard Stambler; Anton Yelchin − Green Room as Pat; Gong Yoo − Train to Busan as Seok-woo; Logan Marshall-Green − The Invitation as Will; Max Records − I Am Not a Serial Killer as John Wayne Cleaver	Anya Taylor-Joy − The Witch as Thomasin; Kika Magalhaes − The Eyes of My Mother as Francisca; Kate Siegel − Hush as Maddie; Natasha Lyonne − Antibirth as Lou; Samantha Robinson − The Love Witch as Elaine
Best Supporting Actor	Best Supporting Actress
Stephen Lang − Don't Breathe as Norman Nordstrom; Patrick Stewart − Green Room as Darcy Banker; John Carroll Lynch − The Invitation as Pruitt; Ralph Ineson − The Witch as William; Richard Brake − 31 as Doom-Head	Jena Malone − The Neon Demon as Ruby; Ella Ballentine − The Monster as Lizzy; Angela Trimbur − Trash Fire as Isabel; Fiona O’Shaughnessy − Nina Forever as Nina; Meg Tilly − Antibirth as Lorna
Best Screenplay	Best Score
The Invitation − Matt Manfredi and Phil Hay; Pet − Jeremy Slater; Last Girl Standing − Benjamin R. Moody; The Similars − Isaac Ezban; Trash Fire − Richard Bates Jr.	The Neon Demon − Cliff Martinez; The Mind's Eye − Steve Moore; The Autopsy of Jane Doe − Danny Bensi and Saunder Jurriaans; The Witch − Mark Korven; Beyond the Gates − Wojciech Golczewski
Best Make-Up/Creature FX	Best International Movie
Green Room − Wayne Eaton; The Monster − Alec Gillis and Tom Woodruff Jr.; Baskin − Baran Bayburt; The Mind's Eye − Brian Spears and Peter Gerner; Night of Something Strange − Colby Flinchum	Train to Busan − Directed by Yeon Sang-ho (South Korea); Baskin − Directed by Can Evrenol (Turkey); The Similars − Directed by Isaac Ezban (Mexico); Under the Shadow − Directed by Babak Anvari (Iran); The Wailing − Directed by Na Hong-jin (South Korea)
Best TV Series	Best TV Make-Up/Creature FX
Stranger Things (Netflix); Ash vs Evil Dead (Starz); Black Mirror (Netflix); Channel Zero: Candle Cove (Syfy); The Exorcist (Fox)	Ash vs Evil Dead − Roger Murray; The Walking Dead − Greg Nicotero and Howard Berger; American Horror Story: Roanoke − Eryn Krueger Mekash and David LeRoy Anderson; Channel Zero: Candle Cove − Doug Morrow; Salem − Matthew Mungle and Clinton Wayne
Best TV Actor	Best TV Actress
Bruce Campbell − Ash vs Evil Dead as Ash Williams; Freddie Highmore − Bates Motel as Norman Bates; Josh Hartnett − Penny Dreadful as Ethan Chandler; Patrick Fugit − Outcast as Kyle Barnes; Paul Schneider − Channel Zero: Candle Cove as Mike Painter	Millie Bobby Brown − Stranger Things as Eleven; Vera Farmiga − Bates Motel as Norma Bates; Eva Green − Penny Dreadful as Vanessa Ives; Geena Davis − The Exorcist as Angela Rance; Lucy Fry − Wolf Creek as Eve Thorogood
Best TV Supporting Actor	Best TV Supporting Actress
Jeffrey Dean Morgan − The Walking Dead as Negan; David Harbour − Stranger Things as Jim Hopper; Ben Daniels − The Exorcist as Father Marcus Keane; Ray Santiago − Ash vs Evil Dead as Pablo Simon Bolivar; Seth Gabel − Salem as Cotton Mather	Winona Ryder − Stranger Things as Joyce Byers; Dana DeLorenzo − Ash vs Evil Dead as Kelly Maxwell; Fiona Shaw − Channel Zero: Candle Cove as Marla Painter; Sarah Paulson − American Horror Story: Roanoke as Audrey Tindall/Shelby Miller; Tamzin Merchant − Salem as Anne Hale

=== Films with multiple nominations ===
Nominations	Films
4	Green Room
4	The Witch
4	The Invitation
2	10 Cloverfield Lane
2	Don't Breathe
2	Baskin
2	The Similars
2	Train to Busan
2	The Autopsy of Jane Doe
2	The Eyes of My Mother
2	Hush
2	I Am Not a Serial Killer
2	Trash Fire
2	Antibirth
2	The Monster
2	The Neon Demon
2	The Mind's Eye

=== TV Series with multiple nominations ===
Nominations	Films
5	Ash vs Evil Dead
4	Channel Zero: Candle Cove
4	Stranger Things
3	The Exorcist
3	Salem
2	American Horror Story: Roanoke
2	The Walking Dead
2	Bates Motel
2	Penny Dreadful
