= Joanna Douglas =

Joanna Douglas may refer to:

- Joanna Douglas (actress), Canadian actress
- Joanna Douglas (Neighbours), recurring character in the Australian soap opera Neighbours
- Joanna Douglas (American actor) in Diamond Safari (1958 film)
