= List of Being Erica episodes =

This is a list of episodes for the program Being Erica. The series debuted on CBC Television on January 5, 2009, and on SOAPnet on February 19, 2009. With the exception of the second season, the series has an ISAN root ID of 125801 (0001-EB69).

== Overview ==
Season	Episodes	Originally released		Region 1 DVD release (Note: Canadian Region 1 DVDs are actually labelled Region 0 (all region).)	Region 2 DVD release
Season	Episodes	First released	Last released	Region 1 DVD release	Region 2 DVD release
1	13	January 5, 2009	April 1, 2009	September 22, 2009	July 1, 2009
2	12	September 22, 2009	December 8, 2009	September 14, 2010	TBA
3	13	September 21, 2010	December 15, 2010	October 18, 2011	TBA
4	11	September 26, 2011	December 12, 2011	June 19, 2012	TBA

== Season 1 (2009) ==
The show moved from Mondays at 9 p.m. to Wednesdays at 9 p.m. effective February 11, 2009. In the United States, SOAPnet aired on Thursdays at 10 p.m., on February 19, 2009.

No. overall	No. in season	Title	Directed by	Written by	Original release date	U.S. airdate	Prod. code
1	1	"Dr. Tom"	Holly Dale	Jana Sinyor	January 5, 2009	February 19, 2009	125801-1
2	2	"What I Am Is What I Am" "Revisionist History"	Chris Grismer	Aaron Martin	January 12, 2009	February 26, 2009	125801-4; 125801-3
3	3	"Plenty of Fish"	Chris Grismer	Jana Sinyor	January 19, 2009	March 5, 2009	125801-2
4	4	"The Secret of Now"	Peter Wellington	James Hurst	January 26, 2009	March 12, 2009	125801-5
5	5	"Adultescence" "Bat Mitzvah"	Kelly Makin	Daegan Fryklind	February 2, 2009	March 19, 2009	125801-6
6	6	"Til Death"	Jeff Woolnough	Story by : Wil Zmak; Teleplay by : Jana Sinyor	February 11, 2009	March 26, 2009	125801-7
7	7	"Such a Perfect Day"	Ron and Mary Murphy	Michael MacLennan	February 18, 2009	April 2, 2009	125801-8
8	8	"This Be the Verse"	David Wharnsby	Daegan Fryklind	February 25, 2009	April 9, 2009	125801-9
9	9	"Everything She Wants"	Jeff Woolnough	Aaron Martin	March 4, 2009	April 16, 2009	125801-10
10	10	"Mi Casa, Su Casa Loma"	Chris Grismer	Semi Chellas	March 11, 2009	April 23, 2009	125801-11
11	11	"She's Lost Control"	Phil Earnshaw	Aaron Martin	March 18, 2009	April 30, 2009	125801-12
12	12	"Erica the Vampire Slayer"	Holly and Susan Dale	Aaron Martin & Jana Sinyor	March 25, 2009	May 7, 2009	125801-13
13	13	"Leo"	Chris Grismer	Jana Sinyor	April 1, 2009	May 14, 2009	125801-14

== Season 2 (2009) ==
Starting on June 23, the first season was completely rerun on Tuesdays at 9pm. Upon the second season's premiere, this timeslot was kept. In the USA, SOAPnet moves the show from Thursdays at 10pm to Wednesdays at 10pm, on January 20, 2010. This season incorrectly used ISAN root IDs for every episode from 140672 (0002–2580) to 141940 (0002-2A74), then later corrected the data entries.

No. overall	No. in season	Title	Directed by	Written by	Original release date	U.S. airdate	Prod. code
14	1	"Being Dr. Tom"	Alex Chapple	Aaron Martin & Jana Sinyor	September 22, 2009	January 20, 2010	140673; 125801-18
15	2	"Battle Royale"	Mary and Ron Murphy	Jana Sinyor	September 29, 2009	January 27, 2010	140672; 125801-19
16	3	"Mama Mia"	Mike and RoseMary McGowan	Shelley Scarrow	October 6, 2009	February 3, 2010	140847; 125801-20
17	4	"Cultural Revolution"	Chris Grismer	Karen McClellan	October 13, 2009	February 10, 2010	140848; 125801-21
18	5	"Yes We Can"	Rick Rosenthal	Aaron Martin	October 20, 2009	February 17, 2010	140849; 125801-17
19	6	"Shhh... Don't Tell"	Jerry Ciccoritti	Jessie Gabe & Aaron Martin	October 27, 2009	February 24, 2010	141894; 125801-23
20	7	"The Unkindest Cut"	David Wharnsby	Story by : Jana Sinyor & Linsey Stewart; Teleplay by : Aaron Martin & Jana Sinyor	November 3, 2009	March 3, 2010	141940; 125801-25
21	8	"Under My Thumb"	Chris Grismer	Shelley Scarrow	November 10, 2009	March 10, 2010	141895; 125801-26
22	9	"A River Runs Through It... It Being Egypt"	Phil Earnshaw	Story by : Aaron Martin & Jana Sinyor; Teleplay by : James Hurst & Shelley Scarrow	November 17, 2009	March 17, 2010	141896; 125801-24
23	10	"Papa Can You Hear Me?"	Phil Earnshaw	Aaron Martin & Jana Sinyor	November 24, 2009	March 24, 2010	141897; 125801-22
24	11	"What Goes Up Must Come Down"	Gary Harvey	Jessie Gabe & Lindsey Stewart	December 1, 2009	March 31, 2010	141898; 125801-27
25	12	"The Importance of Being Erica"	Chris Grismer	Aaron Martin & Jana Sinyor	December 8, 2009	April 7, 2010	141899; 125801-28

== Season 3 (2010) ==
The show moved from Tuesdays at 9 p.m. to Wednesdays at 9 p.m. effective October 20, 2010. In the USA, SOAPnet moved the show on Wednesdays from 10 p.m. to 11 p.m., effective January 26, 2011.

No. overall	No. in season	Title	Directed by	Written by	Original release date	U.S. airdate	Prod. code
26	1	"The Rabbit Hole"	Holly Dale	Aaron Martin & Jana Sinyor	September 21, 2010	January 26, 2011	125801-15
27	2	"Moving On Up"	Rick Rosenthal	Story by : Aaron Martin & Jana Sinyor; Teleplay by : Kate Miles Melville	September 28, 2010	February 2, 2011	125801-16
28	3	"Two Wrongs"	Holly Dale	Story by : Aaron Martin & Jana Sinyor; Teleplay by : Sean Reycraft	October 5, 2010	February 9, 2011	125801-29
29	4	"Wash, Rinse, REPEAT"	Rick Rosenthal	Story by : Aaron Martin & Jana Sinyor; Teleplay by : Esta Spalding	October 12, 2010	February 16, 2011	125801-30
30	5	"Being Adam"	Jeff Woolnough	Story by : Aaron Martin & Jana Sinyor; Teleplay by : Ian Carpenter	October 20, 2010	February 23, 2011	125801-31
31	6	"Bear Breasts"	Alex Chapple	Aaron Martin & Jana Sinyor	October 27, 2010	March 2, 2011	125801-32
32	7	"Jenny from the Block"	Phil Earnshaw	Aaron Martin	November 3, 2010	March 9, 2011	125801-33
33	8	"Physician, Heal Thyself"	Chris Grismer	Jana Sinyor	November 10, 2010	March 16, 2011	125801-34
34	9	"Gettin' Wiggy Wit' It"	John Fawcett	Story by : Aaron Martin & Jana Sinyor; Teleplay by : Jessie Gabe	November 17, 2010	March 23, 2011	125801-35
35	10	"The Tribe Has Spoken"	Kelly Makin	Aaron Martin & Jana Sinyor	November 24, 2010	March 30, 2011	125801-36
36	11	"Adam's Family"	Chris Grismer	Aaron Martin & Jana Sinyor	December 1, 2010	April 6, 2011	125801-38
37	12	"Erica, Interrupted"	Jeff Woolnough	Aaron Martin & Jana Sinyor	December 8, 2010	April 13, 2011	125801-39
38	13	"Fa La Erica"	Érik Canuel	James Hurst & Shelley Scarrow	December 15, 2010	April 20, 2011	125801-37

=== Webisodes ===
Five webisodes in a series entitled The Road Less Travelled can be found on disc 3 of the Season Three DVD North American release.

== Season 4 (2011) ==
No. overall	No. in season	Title	Directed by	Written by	Original release date	Prod. code
39	1	"Doctor Who?"	Ken Girotti	Aaron Martin & Jana Sinyor	September 26, 2011	125801-40
40	2	"Osso Barko"	Gary Harvey	Story by : Aaron Martin & Jana Sinyor; Teleplay by : James Hurst & Shelley Scarrow	October 3, 2011	125801-41
41	3	"Baby Mama"	Ken Girotti	Story by : Aaron Martin & Jana Sinyor; Teleplay by : Julia Cohen	October 10, 2011	125801-42
42	4	"Born This Way"	Gary Harvey	Story by : Aaron Martin & Jana Sinyor; Teleplay by : Shelley Scarrow & James Hurst	October 17, 2011	125801-43
43	5	"Sins of the Father"	Paul and Maria Fox	Story by : Aaron Martin & Jana Sinyor; Teleplay by : Ian Carpenter	October 24, 2011	125801-44
44	6	"If I Could Turn Back Time"	Phil Earnshaw	Story by : Aaron Martin & Jana Sinyor; Teleplay by : Graeme Manson	October 31, 2011	125801-46
45	7	"Being Ethan"	Kari Skogland	Aaron Martin & Jana Sinyor	November 7, 2011	125801-45
46	8	"Please, Please Tell Me Now"	John Fawcett	Aaron Martin & Jana Sinyor	November 14, 2011	125801-47
47	9	"Erica's Adventures in Wonderland"	Paul and Mary Fox	Story by : Aaron Martin & Jana Sinyor; Teleplay by : Amanda Fahey & Aaron Martin & Jana Sinyor	November 28, 2011	125801-48
48	10	"Purim"	John Fawcett	Story by : Aaron Martin & Jana Sinyor; Teleplay by : Amanda Fahey & Aaron Martin & Jana Sinyor	December 5, 2011	125801-49
49	11	"Dr. Erica"	Chris Grismer	Aaron Martin & Jana Sinyor	December 12, 2011	125801-50

== Ratings ==
The Dutch ratings are all according to the SKO (stichting kijk onderzoek) which can be compared to the Nielsen ratings in the US.

=== Season 1 ===
#	Episode	Air date Canada yyyy/mm/dd	Viewers Canada	Air date Netherlands yyyy/mm/dd	Viewers Netherlands
1	"Dr. Tom"	2009/01/05	615,000	2009/04/07	398,000
2	"What I Am is What I Am"	2009/01/12	683,000	2009/04/14	316,000
3	"Plenty of Fish"	2009/01/19	648,000	2009/04/21	294,000
4	"The Secret of Now"	2009/01/26	592,000	2009/04/28	317,000
5	"Adultescence"	2009/02/02	665,000	2009/05/05	309,000
6	"Til Death"	2009/02/11	545,000	2009/05/12	340,000
7	"Such a Perfect Day"	2009/02/18	517,000	2009/05/19	335,000
8	"This Be the Verse"	2009/02/25	462,000	2009/05/26	376,000
9	"Everything She Wants"	2009/03/04	542,000	2009/06/02	337,000
10	"Mi Casa, Su Casa Loma"	2009/03/11	577,000	2009/06/09	305,000
11	"She's Lost Control"	2009/03/18	558,000	2009/10/13	213,000
12	"Erica the Vampire Slayer"	2009/03/25	540,000	2009/10/20	284,000
13	"Leo"	2009/04/01	599,000	2009/10/27	288,000

=== Season 2 ===
#	Episode	Air date Canada yyyy/mm/dd	Viewers Canada	Air date Netherlands yyyy/mm/dd	Viewers Netherlands
1	"Being Dr. Tom"	2009/09/22	550,000	2009/11/03	283,000
2	"Battle Royale"	2009/09/29	755,000	2009/11/10	282,000
3	"Mama Mia"	2009/10/06	462,000	2009/11/17	234,000
4	"Cultural Revolution"	2009/10/13	468,000	2009/11/24	290,000
5	"Yes We Can"	2009/10/20	613,000	2009/12/01	263,000
6	"Shhh… Don't Tell"	2009/10/27	716,000	2009/12/08	297,000
7	"The Unkindest Cut"	2009/11/03	518,000	2009/12/15	234,000
8	"Under My Thumb"	2009/11/10	508,000	2009/12/22	173,000
9	"A River Runs Through It...It Being Egypt"	2009/11/17	604,000	2009/12/29	167,000
10	"Papa Can You Hear Me?"	2009/11/24	589,000	2010/01/12	205,000
11	"What Goes Up Must Come Down"	2009/12/01	673,000	2010/01/19	272,000
12	"The Importance Of Being Erica"	2009/12/08	513,000	2010/01/26	196,000

=== Season 3 ===
#	Episode	Air date Canada yyyy/mm/dd	Viewers Canada
1	"The Rabbit Hole"	2010/09/21	409,000
2	"Moving On Up"	2010/09/28	464,000
3	"Two Wrongs"	2010/10/05	362,000
4	"Wash, Rinse, Repeat"	2010/10/12	400,000
5	"Being Adam"	2010/10/20	401,000
6	"Bear Breasts"	2010/10/27	363,000
7	"Jenny From The Block"	2010/11/03	372,000
8	"Physician, Heal Thyself"	2010/11/10	338,000
9	"Gettin' Wiggy Wit' It"	2010/11/17	445,000
10	"The Tribe Has Spoken"	2010/11/24	404,000
11	"Adam's Family"	2010/12/01	518,000
12	"Erica, Interrupted"	2010/12/08	362,000
13	"Fa La Erica"	2010/12/15	627,000

=== Season 4 ===
#	Episode	Air date Canada yyyy/mm/dd	Viewers Canada
1	Doctor Who?	2011/09/26	351,000
2	Osso Barko	2011/10/03	330,000
3	Baby Mama	2011/10/10	330,000
4	Born This Way	2011/10/17	305,000
5	Sins Of The Father	2011/10/24	272,000
6	If I Could Turn Back Time	2011/10/31	295,000
7	Being Ethan	2011/11/07	326,000
8	Please, Please Tell Me Now	2011/11/14	367,000
9	Erica's Adventures in Wonderland	2011/11/28	243,000
10	Purim	2011/12/05	226,000
11	Dr. Erica	2011/12/12	333,000
