= L.M. Montgomery's Anne of Green Gables =

- Genre: Historical period drama
- Based on: Anne of Green Gables by L.M. Montgomery
- Written by: Susan Coyne
- Directed by: John Kent Harrison
- Starring: Ella Ballentine; Martin Sheen; Sara Botsford
- Composer: Lawrence Shragge
- Country of origin: Canada
- Original language: English

Production
- Executive producers: Joan Lambur; Peter Williamson; Nat Abraham; Ira Levy; Michael McGuigan; Kate Macdonald Butler; Ramon Estevez
- Producer: Ross Leslie
- Cinematography: Ousama Rawi
- Editor: Ron Wisman
- Running time: 90 minutes
- Production company: Breakthrough Entertainment

Original release
- Network: YTV
- Release: February 15, 2016

L.M. Montgomery's Anne of Green Gables is a Canadian television film based on Lucy Maud Montgomery's 1908 novel of the same name. It first aired on YTV on February 15, 2016 and starred Ella Ballentine, Martin Sheen and Sara Botsford. Montgomery's granddaughter, Kate Macdonald Butler, was one of the film's executive producers. The film's world premiere was held February 2, 2016 at the Canadian Museum of History.

The 90-minute film replaced the previously announced 13-part series that had been set to film in 2013. It was filmed in Milton, Ontario and Prince Edward Island.

== Cast ==
- Ella Ballentine as Anne Shirley
- Martin Sheen as Matthew Cuthbert
- Sara Botsford as Marilla Cuthbert
- Julia Lalonde as Diana Barry
- Kate Hennig as Rachel Lynde
- Stefani Kimber as Josie Pye
- Drew Haytaoglu as Gilbert Blythe
- Kyle Gatehouse as Mr. Phillips
- Linda Kash as Mrs. Barry
- Zoe Fraser as Ruby Gillis

== International distribution ==
The film was released theatrically in Australia and New Zealand on June 9 and July 7, 2016, respectively, by Umbrella Entertainment. The company also released it on DVD on October 10, 2016. In the United Kingdom, the movie aired on ITV3 on August 28, 2016 and was later released on DVD on March 20, 2017 by Second Sight Films.

US rights were acquired by PBS, and the film was released on DVD on November 8, with the channel broadcasting it on November 24, 2016 (Thanksgiving Day). The network claims the television run was seen by more than 3.2 million viewers, with an additional 230,000 watching online.

The film has also seen a release in Germany, Poland, Hungary, the Czech Republic and Italy. In Japan, it was released theatrically on May 6, 2017 and later home video, by Happinet and Synergy Entertainment.

== Sequels ==
On September 19, 2016, YTV's parent company, Corus Entertainment announced that they had approved two sequels; Anne of Green Gables: The Good Stars for broadcast in 2017, and Anne of Green Gables: Fire & Dew in 2018. The Good Stars premiered on February 20, 2017. Bumped up from its original 2018 release window, Fire & Dew premiered on July 1, 2017. PBS has also picked up both followups.

| Year | Title | Anne Shirley | Director |
|---|---|---|---|
| 2016 | L.M. Montgomery's Anne of Green Gables | Ella Ballentine | John Kent Harrison |
| 2017 | Anne of Green Gables: The Good Stars | Ella Ballentine | John Kent Harrison |
| 2017 | Anne of Green Gables: Fire & Dew | Ella Ballentine | John Kent Harrison |
