= Ella Ballentine =

Canadian actress (born 2001)

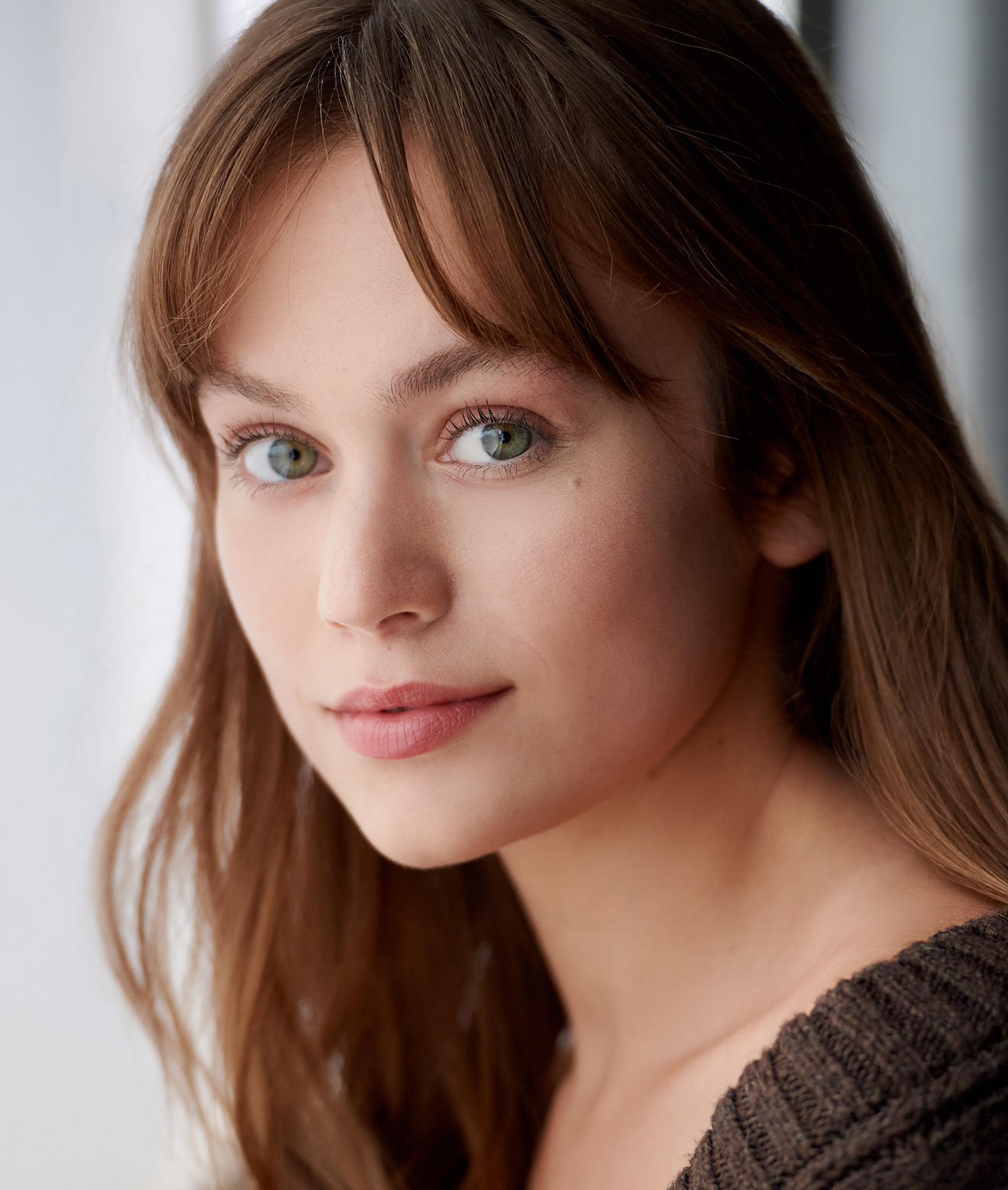
- Ballentine in 2021
- Born: Ella Hope Ballentine; July 18, 2001 (age 25); Toronto, Ontario, Canada
- Occupation: Actress
- Years active: 2011–present

Ella Hope Ballentine (born July 18, 2001) is a Canadian actress. She began her acting career as a child actress on the Toronto stage, before appearing on television and in films. Ballentine's portrayal of Anne Shirley in the television film adaptation of the classic Canadian novel, Anne of Green Gables by L.M. Montgomery was a critical success, receiving a Joey Award in 2016 and a Canadian Screen Award in 2018.

== Career ==
Ballentine was born in Toronto, Ontario, Canada to parents Eva and Blake Ballentine. She is a graduate of the Etobicoke School of the Arts in Toronto. She began her acting career as a child actor on the Toronto stage production of The Railway Children, directed by Damian Cruden (2011) for Mirvish Productions. She went on to appear in other stage performances, including the lead role in Numbers, at the Toronto Fringe Festival (2013), and as Little Cosette / Young Eponine in the 25th Anniversary production of Les Misérables (2013), directed by Laurence Connor and James Powell for Mirvish Productions. Also in 2013, she was invited to the Hilary Weston Writers' Trust Prize for Nonfiction Gala as one of the performers to read from one of the five prize-nominated titles.

Her first TV role came in a Hallmark Channel movie, Baby's First Christmas (2012), in which she played Karen, a primary character with Casper Van Dien in a lead role. She took on her first film role in Atom Egoyan's feature, The Captive (2013), an official selection for the 2014 Cannes Film Festival. She went on to share the screen with Susan Sarandon, Gil Bellows and Christopher Heyerdahl, in The Calling. In her next larger TV movie role for Lifetime's Clara's Deadly Secret (2013), she played Kate alongside co-stars Emmanuelle Vaugier and Richard Ruccolo.

In the 2015 feature film Standoff, Ballentine portrays one of the lead characters, Bird, a young girl who finds protection with an ex-soldier (played by Thomas Jane) from a hit-man (played by Laurence Fishburne). Although the movie received mixed reviews, Rene S. Garcia, Jr. of Workingauthor.com wrote "And let’s not forget Ella Ballentine. I typically have no faith in child actors, but Ella strikes the perfect tone with her burgeoning independence, but emotional and physical dependency." Eoin Friel from ActionElite felt that "Ella Ballentine almost steals the movie as Bird, the girl being pursued by Sade. The poor thing goes through an absolute nightmare and manages to never be the "annoying kid" in the film; she brings genuine heart to proceedings and is essential for Carter's redemption." In an interview on Collider, Jane stated "[Ella] was pretty wonderful. She was fun, too."

Ballentine's next big role cast her as co-lead in writer/director Bryan Bertino's horror film, The Monster (2016) with co-stars Zoe Kazan, and Scott Speedman. The Monster became an independent success and Ella received Fangoria magazine's 2017 Fangoria Chainsaw Award nomination for Best Supporting Actress. "If horror movie performances were given Oscars, [Kazan] would be a shoo-in. Same with Ballentine. These two are so believable," wrote Staci Layne Wilson in Dread Central. Bloody Disgusting, an American horror genre website, called Ballentine "The Most Badass Horror Hero of 2016". According to critics, in the horror movie, The Monster "the spooky-good Ella Ballentine" came up as "a minor revelation." According to the Los Angeles Times' Justin Chang "Ballentine gives a fine, fierce performance as a child wise beyond her years and unafraid of confrontation", and Matt Donato from We Got This Covered writes "Ballentine rolls with the punches well for an actress her age, and this shouldn’t be understated".

In 2016 Ballentine began her role as Anne Shirley in the three-part TV movie adaptation of the classic Canadian novel, Anne of Green Gables. L.M. Montgomery's Anne of Green Gables (2016) followed by The Good Stars (2017), then Fire & Dew (2017). The other main characters were portrayed by Martin Sheen as Matthew Cuthbert and Sara Botsford as Marilla Cuthbert. Ballentine's performance again received critical success and landed her a Canadian Screen Award (2018). "Ballentine is charming as Anne," wrote Francesca Rudkin in the New Zealand Herald. Louise Keller in Urbancinefile states "[Ballentine] is outstanding. Wide-eyed and innocent, she proffers just the right amount of worldliness as the orphan who asks for just two things as she prays for the first time. That is a lovely scene." "I was absolutely delighted by actress Ella Ballentine’s portrayal of Anne Shirley. She was a worthy Anne." wrote Sarah M. Miduski. In an interview with Entertainment Weekly, Sheen says "I adore [Ella]...She’s an extraordinary talent...She’s remarkable. And she’s very funny as well. We have great fun on the set and she’s got a great sense of humor. She’s a joy to work with."

In 2019 Ballentine plays the lead, Jackie in Nicole Dorsey's Black Conflux (2019) with Ryan McDonald as her co-lead. Stephan Dalton of The Hollywood Reporter praised Ballentine's "luminous acting".

In 2021 Hallmark Movies & Mysteries cast Ballentine as Gemma, as one of the leads in their television movie Rise and Shine Benedict Stone, based on author Phaedra Patrick's novel of the same name.

== Filmography ==
=== Film ===
Year	Title	Role	Notes
2012	The Intergalactic Space Adventures of Cleo and Anouk	Anouk	
2013	Lunchbox Loser	Missy	
2014	The Captive	Jennifer	
2014	The Calling	Rose Batten	
2015	Standoff	Bird	
2016	Against the Wild 2: Survive the Serengeti	Emma Croft	
2016	The Monster	Lizzy	a.k.a. There Are Monsters
2016	Milton's Secret	Anna	
2019	Black Conflux	Jackie	
2020	The Dark and the Wicked	Young Girl	
2024	Believer	Kate Harris	
2026	Mike & Nick & Nick & Alice	Marceline	
2026	Back in Black	Sam	

=== Television ===
Year	Title	Role	Notes
2012	Baby's First Christmas	Karen Pendrell	Television film
2013	Clara's Deadly Secret	Kate	Television film
2013	Time Tremors	Medie Reno	Main role
2014	Reign	Voland Girl	Episode: "The Plague"
2014	Saving Hope	Rachel Stewart	Episode: "The Other Side of Midnight"
2016	L.M. Montgomery's Anne of Green Gables	Anne Shirley	Television film
2017	The Good Stars	Anne Shirley	Television film
2017	Fire & Dew	Anne Shirley	Television film
2018	The Detail	Annabelle	Episode: "It Takes a Village"
2021	Rise and Shine, Benedict Stone	Gemma Stone	Television film
2026	The Vampire Lestat	Baby Jenks	Recurring role

=== Video games ===
- Time Tremors (2013), as Medie Reno

== Stage ==
Year	Title	Role	Notes
2011	The Railway Children	Francis Perks	Roundhouse Theatre
2012	Numbers	Felicia	Factory Theatre
2013–2014	Les Misérables	Little Cosette / Young Eponine	Princess of Wales Theatre

== Awards and nominations ==
Year	Award	Category	Work	Result
2014	Dora Mavor Moore Award	Outstanding Performance - Ensemble in a Musical	Les Misérables	Nominated
2016	Joey Awards	Young Actress - MOW	L.M. Montgomery's Anne of Green Gables	Won
2017	Fangoria Chainsaw Awards	Best Supporting Actress	The Monster	Runner-up
2018	Canadian Screen Awards	Canadian Screen Award for Best Performance in a Children's or Youth Program or Series	L.M. Montgomery's Anne of Green Gables: Fire & Dew	Won
2019	Whistler Film Festival	Best Performance in a Borsos Competition Film Award	Black Conflux	Honorable Mention
