= The Calling (2014 film) =

2014 Canadian crime thriller film

- Theatrical release poster
- Directed by: Jason Stone
- Screenplay by: Scott Abramovitch
- Based on: The Calling by Inger Ash Wolfe
- Starring: Susan Sarandon; Gil Bellows; Ellen Burstyn; Topher Grace; Donald Sutherland; Christopher Heyerdahl
- Cinematography: David Robert Jones
- Edited by: Aaron Marshall
- Music by: Grayson Matthews
- Distributed by: Entertainment One Films
- Release dates: August 5, 2014 (U.S., online); August 29, 2014 (Canada & U.S., theatrical)
- Running time: 108 minutes
- Country: Canada
- Language: English

The Calling is a 2014 Canadian crime thriller film adapted from the 2008 novel of the same name by Michael Redhill (published under the pen name Inger Ash Wolfe). The film stars Susan Sarandon, Gil Bellows, Ellen Burstyn, Topher Grace, Donald Sutherland, and Christopher Heyerdahl.

== Plot ==
Inspector Hazel Micallef (Susan Sarandon) is a police officer in the small Ontario town of Fort Dundas. She is called to check in on elderly Delia Chandler and finds the woman nearly decapitated in her living room. Chandler's mouth is twisted as if she was screaming. The police encounter another gruesome murder where a man's stomach has been fed to some dogs. His face was also twisted into a scream. After a third murder, the police come to believe they are dealing with a serial killer. They discover that the mouths have been positioned to form the syllables of the word "Líbera".

Micallef consults Father Price (Donald Sutherland), a priest in the nearby Catholic church who specializes in Latin. Price explains the various meanings and uses of "libera", including a "Resurrection Prayer", which supposedly holds the power to raise the dead. He claims that Jesus was resurrected through the sacrifice of 12 willing souls. Micallef deduces that the serial killer she is pursuing is contorting his victims' faces into the 12 syllables of the Resurrection Prayer.

Micallef's deputy, Ben Wingate (Topher Grace), uses his mother's travel points to fly to British Columbia to follow a lead from the Delia Chandler killing. He finds a woman at a trailer in the middle of the forest and learns that she is delivering gifts from "the disciples" and begs him not to enter the trailer. Inside, Wingate discovers more packages and a body wrapped in formaldehyde-soaked bandages.

At a local coffee shop, a mysterious man (Christopher Heyerdahl) enters and chats with the waitress (Kristin Booth). Because he seems to be carrying a doctor's bag, she tells him that her daughter (Ella Ballentine) has terrible seizures, and he offers to help. At her house, he brews the child some tea and appears to smother her. When Micallef later visits the waitress, she learns that the daughter nearly died from the tea she drank but that a recent MRI revealed she is now symptom-free. The young girl revealed that the mysterious man's name is Simon. Micallef consults the Coroner's Reports on the local victims and realizes that they were all poisoned. She also discovers that they were all terminally ill. She deduces that Simon is gathering his victims from an on-line forum for terminal patients. She tracks down his next victim and sends Wingate to prevent the murder. Wingate is not in time, and Simon grabs him from behind, injecting Wingate with a powerful sedative.

Simon next turns up in Fr. Price's church, where they talk briefly about Simon's mission. It becomes clear that Simon is attempting to resurrect the body in his trailer and that Fr. Price will be his next victim, because he, too, is terminally ill. Fr. Price is willing to be a sacrifice, but he begins to doubt that they are doing the right thing. Wingate and Micallef arrive too late to save Fr. Price. A nun informs Micallef that Simon's real name is Peter and that he and his brother were orphans under Fr. Price's care. One of them was adopted while the other was left in the orphanage. The dead body in the trailer is Peter's brother, who had committed suicide a year earlier.

Micallef's superiors have deduced who Peter's next victim will be, and they have already secured him. Micallef resents being left off the team that will arrest Peter. She finishes off a bottle of whisky and goes home in a stupor. Peter is waiting for her there. He drugs her and takes her to a farmhouse, where he brews her some of his tea. He explains his mission to her, but she remains confused about why he would want to resurrect his brother, who did not want to live. Peter gets her to admit that the true source of her pain is the loss of her baby, and she nearly agrees to be his 12th victim. As she is about to drink the poison, she decides against it. Peter kills himself instead. The film ends with the police raiding the trailer and finding the bed empty.

== Cast ==
- Susan Sarandon as Hazel Micallef
- Gil Bellows as Ray Green
- Ellen Burstyn as Emily Micallef, Hazel's mother
- Topher Grace as Ben Wingate, Hazel's new partner from Toronto
- Donald Sutherland as Father Price
- Christopher Heyerdahl as Simon (The Sin-eater)
- Kevin Parent as Spere
- Katy Breier as Melanie Cartwright
- Ted Whittall as Ian Mason
- John Ralston as Andrew Pederson
- Natalie Radford as Glynnis
- Alex Poch-Goldin as Bob Chandler
- Ella Ballentine as Rose Batten
- Kristin Booth as Grace Batten

== Production ==
The movie was filmed primarily in the community of Dundas in Hamilton, Ontario.

== Reception ==
The Calling grossed over $3 million in the United States on cable, satellite, and video on demand platforms and was #3 on the Top 10 Indie And Theatrical Films of 2014 on Xfinity, Comcast Cable's on demand service.

Rotten Tomatoes gave the film a score of 51% based on 43 reviews with an average score of 5.5/10. Metacritic assigned the film a score of 46 out of 100, based on a weighted average of 11 reviews from mainstream critics.

Los Angeles Times reviewer Gary Goldstein praised the film, calling it "an absorbing, solidly crafted procedural thriller" and noting positively on Stone's directing, Abramovitch's writing, and Sarandon's performance which Goldstein later awarded the Best Actress designation in Los Angeles Times' 4th Annual "Level The Playing Field" nominations during Oscar season. Pete Vonder Haar of The Village Voice wrote that "The Calling breathes new life into a moribund genre by touching oft-ignored themes and offering a bit of introspection to go along with the obligatory slashed throats and biblical portents." In her three star review of the film, critic Elizabeth Weitzman of the New York Daily News noted "If there are any cable executives out there looking for the next great drama, they might want to check out The Calling."

Bruce DeMara of the Toronto Star wrote that the film had "a solid beginning" and complimented Stone on creating "an interesting ... Canadian mood", but criticized the overall plot as "outlandish and preposterous" and stated that the film loses its initial momentum "despite Sarandon's reliably solid performance". Frank Scheck, writing for The Hollywood Reporter, also notes the lack of momentum and cites Stone's pacing as "[keeping] the atmosphere oppressively moody to the point of sluggish tedium," but praises the performances of the actors, especially Heyerdahl's "real level of creepiness."

RogerEbert.com writer Brian Tallerico called the film "a depressingly bad movie" that "miraculously finds a way to waste the prodigious talents of Susan Sarandon, Ellen Burstyn, and Donald Sutherland", likening it to "the colorful elements of Fargo and Seven [blended] into a bland beige." Robbie Collin of The Daily Telegraph called the film's plot predictable and noted that "the dread barely bobs above sea level".

The Calling is rated R16 in New Zealand for graphic violence.
