= Black Conflux =

2019 Canadian drama film

- Official release poster
- Directed by: Nicole Dorsey
- Written by: Nicole Dorsey
- Produced by: Michael Solomon; Mark O'Neill
- Starring: Ella Ballentine; Ryan McDonald
- Cinematography: Marie Davignon
- Edited by: Sophie Leblond
- Production companies: Band With Pictures; Panoramic Pictures
- Release date: September 6, 2019 (Toronto)
- Running time: 100 minutes
- Country: Canada
- Language: English

Black Conflux is a 2019 Canadian drama film written and directed by Nicole Dorsey in her feature directorial debut. Starring Ella Ballentine, Ryan McDonald, Luke Bilyk, Olivia Scriven, Sofia Banzhaf, and Lawrence Barry, the film follows a teenage girl from Newfoundland and Labrador whose quest for independence leads her into the orbit of a mentally unstable and potentially violent man in his twenties.

The film premiered in the Discovery section at the Toronto International Film Festival on September 6, 2019, and was commercially screened on the Digital TIFF Bell Lightbox in 2021.

== Production ==
A key scene in the film is set to Gowan's 1987 single "Moonlight Desires". The film also alludes to Brian Damude's 1975 thriller film Sudden Fury, with a scene in which Dennis is watching the film on video.

== Critical response ==
Norman Wilner of Now gave the film a four-N rating, writing that "while Black Conflux functions primarily as a character study (with excellent work from the leads, and strong support provided by Olivia Scriven and Sofia Banzhaf), it’s also about showing us the environment that shapes those characters – and the odds against their ever escaping it." Nikki Baughan of Screen Daily also reviewed the film positively, stating that the film "doesn’t offer anything groundbreaking in terms of its narrative, but is nevertheless a striking calling card for its talented maker."

Matt Bobkin of Exclaim! was more critical, asserting that "the film's strong beginning and middle showcases plenty of strengths: strong acting, natural dialogue and rich cinematography", but concluding that it was ultimately undermined by an anticlimactic ending.

Stephan Dalton of The Hollywood Reporter wrote the first International review and praised the film for its "strong visual aesthetic”, and "sufficient depth and polish to secure more festival bookings”. The review takes note of cinematographer Marie Davignon's "gorgeous imagery”, actor Ella Ballentine's "luminous acting", and notes about director Nicole Dorsey's work that “even if this deceptively artful debut feels a little muted and unpolished in places, it is plainly the work of a skilled filmmaker with ample future potential.”

David Davidson of The Globe and Mail praised the film, writing that "it is rare for a first feature to be so well directed, thoughtful and entertaining" and comparing it to Anne Wheeler's 1986 film Loyalties and Lynne Stopkewich's 2000 film Suspicious River "with their atmosphere of dread and depiction of rural life as a hotbed of sexual fantasies and violence".

== Awards ==
In December 2019, the film was named to TIFF's annual year-end Canada's Top Ten list.

The film received two Canadian Screen Award nominations at the 8th Canadian Screen Awards in 2020, for Best Actor (McDonald) and the John Dunning Best First Feature Award.
