= Standoff (film) =

- Theatrical release poster
- Directed by: Adam Alleca
- Written by: Adam Alleca
- Produced by: Tove Christensen; Hayden Christensen; Lee Clay; Eric Gozlan; Michael Wexler; Rosie Komadina
- Starring: Laurence Fishburne; Thomas Jane
- Distributed by: Saban Films
- Release dates: January 4, 2016 (United Kingdom); February 26, 2016 (United States)
- Running time: 80 minutes
- Box office: $1.19 million

Standoff is a 2016 American thriller film by Adam Alecca starring Laurence Fishburne and Thomas Jane.

== Plot ==
A young girl named Bird is dropped off by a man to visit two graves, where she witnesses and photographs a hitman killing people at a burial. When the man, Roger, comes looking for her, the hitman kills him and turns to her (noticing her camera), but she flees into the woods and arrives at the house of a man named Carter, who vows to protect her. The hitman enters the house and he tried to shoot him, who shoots him in return. Carter is stuck upstairs and the hitman downstairs. Carter sends the girl for some light bulbs, which he breaks and throws down the stairs. Bird tells Carter what happened in the cemetery and that she has a picture of the hitman; Carter directs her to hide the film in the toilet tank. The hitman finds a picture of Carter in military uniform with his wife and son and goads him over their leaving him.

A sheriff's deputy happens upon the abandoned cars at the cemetery. In the house, Carter has a flashback about his son, who accidentally died when he fell on a piece of farming equipment Carter neglected to clean up. The hitman finds and reads a letter Carter had written his wife, taking blame for the death of their son. He antagonizes Carter who he realizes was contemplating suicide. While Bird and Carter talk about his family, the hitman fires his gun, which the deputy hears. The lights in the house start to fade and Carter realizes he needs to get Bird out as he cannot protect them both in the dark.

The deputy arrives while Carter is trying to get Bird out through a window. The hitman shoots the deputy through the door, scaring Bird, who goes back upstairs. The hitman hides the deputy's car and starts to head back to the house, but Carter confronts him and tells him to leave. The hitman tries to goad him to shoot, guessing he only has the one shot. Carter relents because the hitman has taken the deputy's gun. Inside, he tries to barter with Carter for the deputy's life. After breaking his fingers, he kills the deputy.

After a period of silence, Carter tells Bird to hide and heads downstairs. He hears creaking above him and finds the hitman's boots. Realizing he has snuck onto the roof, Carter follows him back in through a window. Surprised, the hitman steps on the broken bulbs and falls down the stairs. They resume their standoff. The hitman considers burning the house down but reconsiders his plan when he remembers he has Carter's cell phone.

As night falls, both men are injured and tired. A vehicle arrives and Carter sees that the hitman has called his wife, Mara, claiming he was worried about Carter. He once again barters for the girl. Carter gives Bird the shotgun, instructing her to aim down the stairs and shoot if she sees the hitman. Angry that Carter came instead of the girl, the hitman shoots Carter in the knee. As they argue, Bird descends the stairs to protect Carter. The lights flicker, distracting the hitman and Carter rushes him. He stabs the hitman repeatedly, but is shot as the lights go out. Mara runs outside and calls 911 and Bird approaches the hitman, who is dying. He tells her to shoot him but the trigger simply clicks; the round is a dud. Amused at his bad luck, the hitman refuses to kill Bird since he is already dying and no need to protect his identity anymore. She runs to Carter assuming the worst, but he is alive. Mara returns and the three embrace.

== Cast ==
- Laurence Fishburne as the Hitman
- Thomas Jane as Carter Greene
- Ella Ballentine as Isabelle (Bird)
- Jim Watson as Officer Jerry Baker
- Joanna Douglas as Mara Greene
- Laura de Carteret as Woman

== Development ==
Thomas Jane was confirmed to join the cast on May 1, 2014.

It was shot in Ontario, Canada, in locations including Sault Ste Marie, Echo Bay and Bar River. Casting calls were held in September 2014.

== Reception ==
On Rotten Tomatoes it has a score of 53% based on reviews from 15 critics. On Metacritic it has a score of 36% based on reviews from 5 critics, indicating "generally unfavorable reviews".

The Hollywood Reporter gave it a mixed review, calling it: "A solid if unsurprising B-movie whose title says it all". Writing for RogerEbert.com, Glenn Kenny awarded it one out of four stars, saying: "To give credit where it’s due, this lukewarm mess of a movie delivers what its title promises." Slant Magazine gave it a mixed review, saying: "Standoff isn't quite inspired, but it coasts on unexpected modesty of professionalism." The LA Times gave it a negative review, saying: "At the end of the very long day, not even Fishburne's dependable gravitas is able to pummel this stagy gab-fest into submission."
