= Kate Macdonald Butler =

Canadian television producer

- Born: Canada
- Other name: Kate Macdonald
- Occupation: Television producer
- Known for: Heir of Lucy Maud Montgomery

Kate Macdonald Butler is President of the Heirs of L.M. Montgomery. She is a granddaughter of celebrated author Lucy Maud Montgomery, and one of the heirs to her intellectual property rights, and has been a principal in multiple lawsuits to secure those rights.

On September 17, 2008, marking the 100th anniversary of the publication of Anne of Green Gables, Butler published an op-ed in The Globe and Mail in which she revealed that Lucy Maud Montgomery had struggled with depression for most of her adult life. She disclosed that Montgomery's family was aware of how her battles with melancholy and the responsibility of caring for a husband who was suffering from serious mental illness had driven her to drug addiction and despair. Butler revealed that the family believed Montgomery had intentionally given herself a fatal overdose. According to CBC Books, Butler wrote the op-ed to try and strip the shame from living individuals struggling with mental health issues.

Kevin Sullivan and Montgomery's heirs reached an agreement in 1984 that allowed him to produce the highly popular 1985 miniseries that starred Megan Follows. The agreement gave the family an upfront lump sum, and promised them a share of the profits "in perpetuity" on the original productions and on derivative works. Butler and her fellow heirs took Sullivan and his production company, Sullivan Entertainment, to court in 1999. The prospectus written for potential investors when Sullivan planned to turn Sullivan Entertainment into a publicly traded company described the original series and derivative works as highly profitable, yet he had told Montgomery's heirs there were no profits to share. Sullivan counter-sued, for defamation. Montgomery's heirs won that law suit on every count and did not defame Sullivan Entertainment.

In 2012 Butler took a lead role in producing three new adaptations of the Green Gables story, starring Martin Sheen. She was involved "from script to screen".

In 2017 when another team of filmmakers was adapting the Green Gables story that would air head-to-head with her version Butler was nevertheless gracious, stating "it's an evergreen property and a classic.".

In 2017 Butler published an updated version of the 112-page cookbook she first published in 1985, "The Anne of Green Gables Cookbook: Charming Recipes from Anne and Her Friends in Avonlea". It consists of recipes Butler adapted from her grandmother's books, with advice on cooking, and kitchen etiquette addressed to younger readers.
