= Baskin (film) =

- Theatrical release poster
- Directed by: Can Evrenol
- Written by: Can Evrenol; Cem Özüduru; Erçin Sadıkoğlu; Eren Akay
- Produced by: Mo Film
- Starring: Mehmet Cerrahoğlu; Ergun Kuyucu
- Cinematography: Alp Korfali
- Edited by: Erkan Özekan
- Music by: JF (Ulas Pakkan & Volkan Akaalp)
- Production company: Mo Film
- Distributed by: The Salt Company International
- Release dates: September 11, 2015 (Toronto International Film Festival); January 1, 2016
- Running time: 97 minutes
- Country: Turkey
- Language: Turkish

Baskin is a 2015 Turkish surrealist horror film directed by Can Evrenol, based on his 2013 short film by the same name. It centers around five police officers who have inadvertently wandered into Hell.

First screened at the Toronto International Film Festival on September 11, 2015, the film marks Evrenol's feature film directorial debut. Actors Muharrem Bayrak and Gorkem Kasal, who had performed in the short film version, returned to star in the full-length film, joined by Ergun Kuyucu, Fatih Dokgoz and Sabahattin Yakut as the five police officers that make up the film's main cast of protagonists. First-time actor Mehmet Cerrahoglu has received positive reviews for his noteworthy performance as the villain, The Father. Cerrahoglu suffers from an ultra rare skin condition called GAPO syndrome which gives him his unique physical appearance.

== Plot ==
A young boy wakes in the night after hearing strange sexual noises from his mother's bedroom. He sees his TV showing static and is suddenly terrified by a vision from his room. He screams and frantically knocks upon mother's bedroom door, which is locked, as a hand reaches toward him from the darkness.

The film then cuts to a hooded figure delivering a bucket of raw meat to a small restaurant. Five police officers dining there, Remzi, Arda, Yavuz, Apo, and Seyfi, discuss sex. Seyfi, who has been feeling unwell, runs to the toilet and notices a frog on the soap stand. Yavuz starts a fight with the restaurant owner's son, and the men decide to leave. Seyfi insists on driving despite his sickness.

Whilst driving, the men receive a call for back up from colleagues who have gone to Inceagac, a town known for strange rumors. Seyfi has a terrifying vision of a bloody figure and accidentally drives their van into a lake. Stranded, the officers make their way to Inceagac. The locals warn them of the dangers in the village. They head to an abandoned Ottoman-era police station, the origin of the distress call.

Once inside, they discover a fellow policeman in a wildly catatonic state. Seyfi stays with the man as the other four investigate. Seyfi discovers a room containing a group of cultists covered in blood and viscera. He is too terrified to move as the cultists swarm over him, dragging him into their midst.

As they move through the building, the other men witness horrifying images and are subjected to increasingly bizarre and surreal scenarios. Through flashbacks and dream sequences, it is revealed that Remzi has been like a father figure to Arda, having taken him in as a young man, and Arda was the young boy in the opening scene.

The remaining men are tied up in a dungeon surrounded by the cultists. A hooded figure known as The Father reveals himself to them; he and the cultists kill Apo, Yavuz and Remzi. The Father explains that hell is not somewhere you go, it's something you carry with you at all times. A dying Remzi gives Arda a key, which he uses to overpower The Father and escape the building.

Laughing triumphantly, Arda runs from the village along a road. He flags down an oncoming vehicle, but the driver doesn't spot him and he is run over. It is revealed that the vehicle is the same police van the men travelled in earlier, and this was the same vision Seyfi had seen. The five men crash once more into the lake.

== Cast ==
- Ergun Kuyucu as Boss Remzi
- Muharrem Bayrak as Yavuz
- Gorkem Kasal as Arda
- Fatih Dokgöz as Apo
- Sabahattin Yakut as Seyfi
- Mehmet Cerrahoglu as Baba / The Father
- Sevket Suha Tezel as Master Creep / The Servant
- Fadik Bülbül as Sister Butcher
- Mehmet Akif Budak as Diner Footboy

== Production ==
Baskin was directed by Can Evrenol, who also co-wrote the film, and is based on Evrenol's earlier short film of the same name. The film was independently financed and shot in Istanbul by MO Film, with a budget around US$350,000. It was a 28-night shoot, with no day shots, with a month of pre-production and a post-production stage of 2 months. In an interview with Fangoria, Evrenol said:

Our permits were at times iffy, so we were always stressed about the authorities finding out what the hell we were doing in some of our crazy locations. We had naked people on set in the most conservative areas of town. That was a constant stress. Also, the time limitations for certain scenes made them really difficult, and that single underwater shot cost us almost half a shooting night.

== Reception ==
On Rotten Tomatoes, the film holds an approval rating of 78% based on 41 reviews, with a weighted average rating of 6.66/10. Its consensus reads, "Baskin complements its gory thrills with heavy atmosphere and deliberate pacing, adding up to a horror outing that plays with the mind as enthusiastically as it ruins the appetite." On Metacritic, which assigns a normalized rating to reviews, the film has a weighted average score of 58 out of 100, based on 12 critics, indicating "mixed or average reviews".

Shock Till You Drop praised the film and drew comparisons to the work of Italian horror director Lucio Fulci, writing "BASKIN feels like a steroidal version of a vintage early 80’s Fulci film; not a rip-off or an homage by any stretch, but an heir to the same philosophies of filmmaking, the same desire to create an unrelenting, dreamscape of Grand Guignol and emotional response." Noel Murray from Los Angeles Times called the film "well made and imaginatively upsetting", while noting that the film's excessive gore might not be for all tastes. Tom Huddleston from Time Out London awarded the film 4/5 stars, calling it "[an] atmospheric, genuinely nightmarish Turkish horror movie". Huddleston praised the film's visuals as being "painstaking and horribly beautiful", while noting the film's thin plot and minimal character development.

Richard Whittaker from Austin Chronicle offered the film similar praise, writing, "From the opening moments, he [Evrenol] creates an unnerving mood and a sense of complete cosmology that the humans within it can never fully comprehend. That final sequence is truly squirm-inducing, not least because he changes tone so completely from the opening and middle sequences, from verite, to fast-cut scares, to long, languorous, brooding shots of this incredible antechamber to hell that he has created." Ben Kenigsberg from The New York Times gave the film a positive review, comparing it to A Nightmare on Elm Street for its themes of childhood and dreams, and its lavish use of violence and gore.

The film was not without its detractors, with some critics complaining about the plot lacking any narrative sense. Dennis Harvey from Variety wrote a mixed review, stating "Of interest as a rare modern Turkish horror film, Can Evrenol’s debut feature will be a must-see for fans at fantasy fests, but its initial promise dissipates in a muddle of repetitious phantasmagoria and too little narrative or character development." David Rooney from The Hollywood Reporter criticized the film for its nonsensical narrative, writing, "[Baskin] offers little in the way of narrative involvement or scares but doesn't stint on sustained, stylized revulsion." Jake Dee from Arrow in the Head gave the film a score of 5/10, stating, "After an engrossing opener to capture the imagination, too many downturns and repetitive horror tenets are unveiled that detract from the intriguing freshness of the opening. The film is shot well, acted believably and features an unnerving musical score and bouts of violence that are sure to impress some. But when all is said and done, it's hard to come away from the film with anything other than the assurance that director Can Evrenol has a great movie in him somewhere."

=== Awards ===
Baskin won the Best New Director award at Fantasticfest, and The Director's Award at Mórbido Fest 2015.

== Home media ==
Capelight Pictures released a Limited Collector's Edition DVD and Blu-ray combo pack in Germany on April 29, 2016. It was later released in the United States by Scream Factory on August 9, 2016, as a two-disk DVD/Blu-ray combo pack.
