= Nicole Dorsey =

Canadian film director and screenwriter

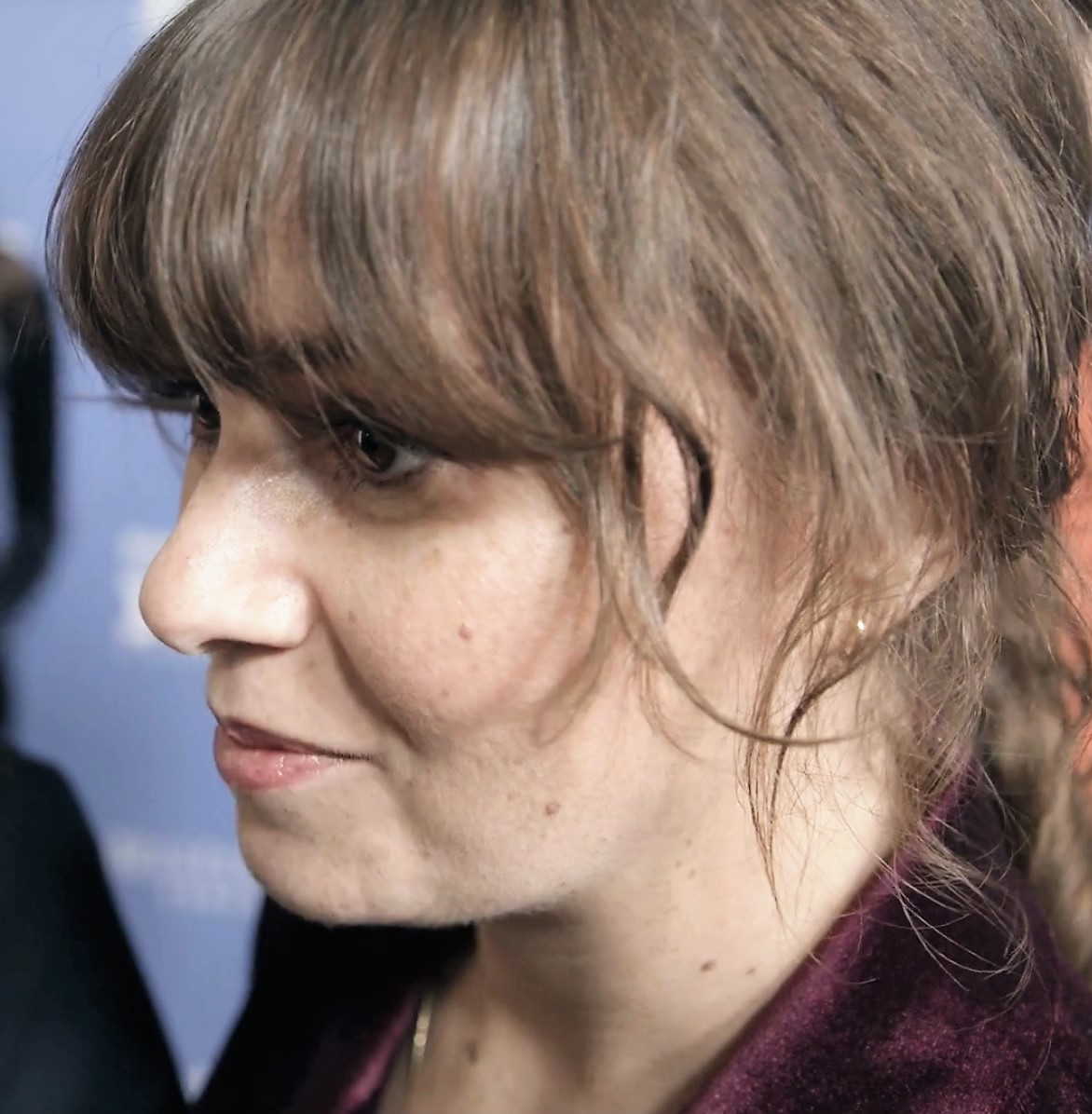
- Dorsey at the 2020 Santa Barbara International Film Festival
- Born: Burlington, Ontario, Canada
- Education: M. M. Robinson High School; Ryerson University (BFA, film)
- Website: nicoledorsey.com

Nicole Dorsey is a Canadian film director and screenwriter, whose debut feature film, Black Conflux, premiered at the 2019 Toronto International Film Festival.

== Early life and education ==
A native of Burlington, Ontario, Dorsey attended M.M. Robinson High School. She is a graduate of the film studies program at Ryerson University.

== Career ==
At 18, Dorsey got her start in the industry as a part-time props assistant on the Rick Mercer Report. Dorsey directed a number of short films prior to her feature debut, Black Conflux, including Ivadelle (2009), Pop the Grapes (2013), Dennis (2015), Star Princess (2015) and Arlo Alone (2018).

Black Conflux premiered at the 2019 Toronto International Film Festival and was subsequently named to TIFF's annual year-end Canada's Top Ten list for 2019, and received a nomination for the John Dunning Best First Feature Award at the 8th Canadian Screen Awards in 2020.

Trailer for Balestra (2024)

Dorsey directed the six-episode CBC Gem series Something Undone. Her sophomore film, Balestra, a thriller about fencing, is in production. It is set to be produced both as a feature-length film and, as an alternate, as a limited series.

== Personal life ==
Dorsey currently splits her time between LA and Toronto.
