= Joanna Douglas (actress) =

Canadian actress

- Born: Sault Ste. Marie, Ontario, Ontario, Canada
- Years active: 2007–present

Joanna Douglas is a Canadian actress. She is best known for portraying Samantha Strange on Being Erica. She is a graduate of the University of Toronto and Sheridan College’s joint theatre and drama studies program.

== Life and career ==
Born in Sault Ste. Marie, Ontario, Douglas attended high school in a new district at her mother’s encouragement to give her a fresh start. Her involvement in dance led to interest in the arts and later involvement in her high school drama program.

Douglas described her role on Being Erica as a "wonderful opportunity" and praised the series’ writing. For her role in Saw 3D, she noted she had not previously seen any of the franchise’s films because they "terrify" her.

== Filmography ==
Year	Title	Role	Notes
2007	All the Good Ones Are Married	Zoe	TV movie
2008	The Border	Andrea Downie	Episode: "Normalizing Relations"
2008	The Four Horsemen	Angie	Direct-to-video film
2009	St. Roz	Minnie's Secretary	TV movie
2009	Taking a Chance on Love	Eve Miller	TV movie
2009	Flashpoint	Zoe Granger	Episode: "Never Let You Down"
2010	Heartland	Victoria	Episode: "Quarantine"
2010	Happy Town	Officer Shell Jenkins	Recurring role (6 episodes)
2010	Rookie Blue	Ashley Kennedy	Episode: "In Blue"
2010	Saw 3D	Joan	Film
2009-2011	Being Erica	Samantha Strange	Main role
2011	Republic of Doyle	Leah Jordan	Episode: "A Stand Up Guy"
2011	New Year	Allison Godfrey	Film
2011	Warehouse 13	Courtney Moore	Episode: "Trials"
2011	In a Family Way	Mona	Direct-to-video film
2012	Suits	Myra Harrison	Episode: "She Knows"
2012	Saving Hope	Heather Day	Episode: "The Great Randall"
2012	Perception	Valerie Nelson	Episode: "Pilot"
2013	The Listener	Paula King	Episode: "Cold Storage"
2015	Crimson Peak	Maid Annie	Film
2016	11.22.63	Doris Dunning	Episodes: "The Rabbit Hole", "The Kill Floor"
2016	Murdoch Mysteries	Wendy Nelson	Episode: "The Devil Inside"
2016	Standoff	Mara	Film
2017	Christmas Inheritance	Cara Chandler	TV movie
2018	The Handmaid’s Tale	Heather	Episode: "Baggage"
2018-2019	Anne with an E	Miss Muriel Stacy	Main role (seasons 2–3)
2019	Good Witch	Karen	Episode: "Tale of Two Hearts"
2023	Cascade	Amber	Film
