= Being Erica =

2009 Canadian comedy-drama television series

- First season intertitle
- Also known as: The Session
- Genre: Comedy drama
- Created by: Jana Sinyor
- Starring: Erin Karpluk; Michael Riley; Tyron Leitso; Vinessa Antoine; Reagan Pasternak; Morgan Kelly; John Boylan; Kathleen Laskey; Joanna Douglas; Adam MacDonald; Paula Brancati; Sarah Gadon; Sebastian Pigott; Devon Bostick; Laurence Leboeuf; Adam Fergus
- Opening theme: "All I Ever Wanted to Be" performed by Lily Frost
- Composers: Trevor Yuile; Lily Frost
- Country of origin: Canada
- Original language: English
- No. of seasons: 4
- No. of episodes: 49 (list of episodes)

Production
- Executive producers: David Fortier; Ivan Schneeberg; Aaron Martin; Jana Sinyor
- Producers: James Hurst; Karen McClellan; Steve Wakerfied; Regina Robb; Brenda Greenberg; Claire Welland
- Production locations: Toronto, Ontario, Canada
- Camera setup: Panavision
- Running time: 45 minutes
- Production company: Temple Street Productions

Original release
- Network: CBC
- Release: January 5, 2009 – December 12, 2011

Being Erica is a Canadian comedy-drama television series that aired on CBC from January 5, 2009, to December 12, 2011. Created by Jana Sinyor, the series was originally announced by the CBC as The Session, but was later retitled Being Erica before debuting in 2009. It is produced by Temple Street Productions and distributed internationally by BBC Worldwide. The show stars Erin Karpluk as Erica Strange, a woman who begins seeing a therapist to deal with regrets in her life, only to discover a therapist (Michael Riley) who has the ability to send her back in time to actually relive these events and even change them.

In Canada, the second season premiered on September 22, 2009. Only 12 episodes were produced for the second season due to budget cuts at the CBC. On May 11, 2010, the CBC announced that Being Erica was renewed for a third season of 13 episodes. Soapnet announced that it was picking up the full third season as well. Season 3 debuted on September 21, 2010, at 9 pm ET, on CBC Television. In the United States, Season 3 began airing on Soapnet starting January 26, 2011.

The show's fourth and final season aired from September to December 2011. Although the show was never officially cancelled by the CBC, Sinyor told TV Guide during the fourth season run that the series had reached a natural conclusion and she had "no plans" to write or produce a fifth season.

== Premise ==
Erica Strange is a young woman, smart and well-educated, but an underachiever who has been perennially unlucky in her career and her love life. After accidentally consuming a drink with hazelnut flavouring, to which she is allergic, she wakes up in the hospital and meets Dr. Tom, who claims that he can help her fix everything that is not going well in her life. Although initially reluctant, she soon learns that what he is offering is the ability to go back in time to relive and even change her deepest regrets.

Each time she faces a problem in the present, Dr. Tom sends her back to revisit a related regret. The situation is rarely as simple as it first appears: in nearly every case, the event she was seeking to avoid by acting differently still occurs, and she must instead seek out new information to uncover the event's real meaning, which gives her new insight into how to handle her problem in the present. It quickly becomes apparent the therapy's true purpose is not to let Erica erase her regrets, but to help her improve her future by learning from past mistakes and making different decisions in the present.

Over the course of the series, the sessions also serve to reveal some of the limitations and complications, as well as the metaphysical implications, of the therapy process — such as whether a patient can intervene to change somebody else's destiny besides their own, whether the therapist can intervene on the patient's behalf to change their past without the patient's knowledge, whether a patient is allowed to reveal the future to another person during a session, and whether the therapy was ever really happening or was merely a dream all along. Later seasons introduce a group therapy session, where several patients gather to discuss and share ideas about one patient's time travel sessions.

== Characters ==
Because the show involves time travel, very young versions of the characters are played at times by different actors.

Erica Strange (Erin Karpluk) – the protagonist in the series. At the beginning of the series, she is 32, single, Jewish, and well-educated. However, she is an underachiever who has recently been fired from a mindless customer service job because she is overqualified. She has a nut allergy and after accidentally drinking coffee with nut syrup in it, she ends up in hospital where she is approached by someone she initially believes to be connected with the hospital. He introduces himself as "Dr Tom" and says he is a therapist who can help her. Once home again, she is convinced poor choices made in her past have made her life a failure and seeks Dr. Tom's help to undo many of her mistakes. As the series progresses, she gains confidence in herself and her choices, dates and finds love, and gets promoted to junior editor at a publishing house, from which she eventually gets fired in the penultimate episode of the second season. She has a master's degree in English literature. During the third season she and Julianne start their own publishing company 50/50 Press and become good friends in the process. Having written short stories throughout her life, Erica aspires to write fiction as an author. In the season 3 finale, Erica passes Dr. Tom's test at the end of group therapy and becomes a trainee doctor. The penultimate episode of season 3 ends with Erica walking down a street in Toronto looking for somebody to give her business card to so they can become her first patient. In the series finale of season 4, Erica successfully completes her doctor training and becomes an official doctor. Her office is a quote-plastered artist's studio loft with a honeycomb-style bookcase and a tan leather chair behind a large, red desk. Even though she has to bid farewell to Dr. Tom, the now Dr. Erica remains connected to him through his daughter Sarah who becomes her first official patient. In the episode "Adultescence", a 12-year-old Erica Strange is played by teen actor Samantha Weinstein; Rachel Marcus plays a young Erica in the episode "Fa La Erica"; Grace Arianna Kirby plays a childhood Erica in the series finale "Dr. Erica".

Dr. Tom Wexlar (Michael Riley) – Erica's therapist. He has a habit of citing quotations, often to Erica's annoyance. Instead of helping Erica directly with her problems when they meet in the past, he is often vague and inscrutable, giving clues that relate to her present-day life. In his more mundane life before his own therapy and ultimately becoming a therapist, he was married to Marjorie (Shauna MacDonald) and had a daughter named Sarah (Tatiana Maslany). Sarah ran away from home in 1996, resulting in Tom's downward spiral of alcoholism and violence, culminating in a suicide attempt; it is sometimes implied that Dr. Tom may partly be using Erica as a substitute for Sarah. It is also revealed in "Sins of the Father" that he was engaged once before to Amanda Mathieson (Suzy Joachim) until he pushed her away; they meet once more in the present and rekindle their relationship. In "Physician, Heal Thyself", Sarah returns after a long absence, seeking her parents' help to kick her heroin addiction. She then burglarizes their home and ends up in prison. Dr. Tom comes to visit her and instructs her to take more responsibility for her own life instead of relying on him to bail her out. His office is very regal, and looks very much like a study or a library. After careful consideration and with his life flourishing after reuniting with Amanda, Dr. Tom decides to resign as a therapist on the condition that he is to sever all ties with his patients, including Erica. At first, he struggles with his decision upon seeing the heartbroken Erica, but ultimately bids farewell to his favorite patient. With Erica as witness to his departure, his office disappears into a vast, white space.

=== Erica's friends ===
Julianne Giacomelli (Reagan Pasternak) – Head editor at River Rock Publishing's non-fiction department and Erica's boss and eventual business partner at 50/50 Press, and Brent's current girlfriend. Although her perky demeanor often leads people to underestimate or belittle her intelligence, she is a savvy businesswoman who especially excels at the marketing and networking aspects of her job; she is, for example, the only editor who has ever figured out how to keep star River Rock author Thomas Friedken's rampant ego under control. However, she also has a habit of being particularly cruel to employees, including Erica, who trigger her insecurities. During the first season, Julianne warms up to Erica, mostly because the quality of her work makes Julianne look better to her superiors. Julianne is involved in an affair with Friedken, until Erica catches him cheating on her in the second season. Julianne then publicly humiliates Friedken and he turns the tables on her by giving his book to Brent to edit. Along with Erica, Julianne gets fired from her job after insulting her superior. The two then start their own publishing company, 50/50 Press. Julianne often misuses airquotes, much to the aggravation of Erica. Her pet name for Erica is "Chicken"; the season 3 Christmas special reveals that this was her father's pet name for her. In season 4, Julianne becomes Erica's second training patient due to her insecurity. She and Brent become closer, which leads to a one-night stand in their office. After Brent expresses his love for her, she realizes that she loves him too and they officially begin dating.

Ethan Wakefield (Tyron Leitso) – Ethan is a fourth grade teacher and has been Erica's best friend since their university days. He is introverted and prefers stability and predictability, in contrast to his ex-wife Claire's and Erica's extroverted personalities. In the second episode, he moves next door to Erica after separating from Claire in Montreal after finding out she had an affair. Erica's growing love for him after fifteen years of "just friends" was a major theme in the first season. Ethan divorces Claire and begins dating Erica; however, in the second season finale, Erica breaks up with him because she felt he was constraining her. While she still loved him, she recognized that they were not compatible enough to stay together. Ethan returns in season four as he bumps into Erica on her lunch break. He reveals that he had just gotten out of a serious relationship until Erica pushes him to confront his real reason for the breakup. He realizes that he wants his girlfriend back and reunites with her, along with Erica's help. Erica and Ethan become friends again to this day.

Judith Winters (Vinessa Antoine) – Erica's best friend. Erica and Judith are introduced to one another by Katie when Judith joins them in working together at Casa Loma. Judith is married and gives birth to a son during the first season. Her new duties of motherhood temporarily estrange her and Erica's relationship, but after Erica speaks her mind about how Judith's attitude has changed, they make amends. In the third season, Judith and her husband Anthony undergo marriage counseling when she encounters her high school sweetheart and literary agent, Will Appleyard (Shaun Benson). Their old feelings rekindle to the point of culminating into a near-affair. Judith then decides to cut off contact with Will to save her marriage.

Jennifer "Jenny" Zalen (Paula Brancati) – Jenny is outgoing, flirtatious, immature, and a keen partygoer and promise-breaker, and current real estate agent. She was one of Erica's closest friends whom Erica had known since elementary school. In the second season, she left Canada and moved to Los Angeles in order to follow her new boyfriend. During her session to stop Jenny from bullying another student Fiona Watt, Erica learned that the reason behind it stemmed from their rivalry over a popular chemistry teacher, Mr. Callahan. Jenny had an affair with Callahan until he broke it off and became involved with Fiona. Erica then reported the incident to the principal and got Callahan fired later that day, completing her session. In the third season, Jenny returned from L.A. after six months due to a breakup, homeless and unemployed. It is revealed that the move became a mistake and she ended up in debt from maxing out her credit cards. Upon her return, Jenny briefly became Erica and Julianne's assistant at 50/50 until she accidentally let Brent get hold of a manuscript. Having pulled Jenny's weight throughout the majority of her life, Erica decided to end her friendship for her own benefit. Jenny is then seen crying in the hall outside Erica's apartment, having lost the only friend she ever had. A year later, Jenny shows up at Erica's 35th birthday, on the latter's invitation (who after having lived a past regret and learned that no one is perfect as they sometimes seem). She has since gotten her life together with a job in real estate. Erica and Jenny then renew their friendship.

Kai Booker (Sebastian Pigott) – Introduced in the second season, he is a barista and server at Goblins, a coffee shop that Erica frequents. He is undergoing the same sort of therapy that Erica is doing with Dr. Tom, albeit with a different doctor named Fred. It is revealed to Erica that although he is 22 in her present, he is actually undergoing therapy ten years into the future, and is in the midst of a session ten years in his past (which is the present) to fix a regret (his bandmate/best friend Travis' suicide). At the end of the second season, he completes that session of his therapy and returns to the future. He later returns to correct another past regret in 2010 (refusing to play a gig at Goblins which he successfully undoes). In the third season Kai returns to Erica on a regret to tell her that he has been looking for her in her future (his present), but is unable to find any trace of her. He worries that she died in a large tragedy that happened in Toronto 10 years into Erica's future. In "Physician, Heal Thyself", he and Erica make love to each other before he leaves and presumably returns to the year 2019. Kai returns once again in the fourth season to correct another regret, but it is apparent that he still has lingering feelings for Erica, despite her being with Adam. After her breakup with Adam, Kai takes a chance to comfort Erica and she decides to be with him. At Dave and Ivan's wedding where he is best man, Kai proposes to Erica but she feels that their relationship is moving too fast. After her session with Dr. Tom, she breaks up with Kai because they are separated by time, making it impossible to continue their romance. He realizes that his regret is not to complete his first album, but to bid farewell to Erica, his one true love. He returns to the future with Dr. Fred to concentrate on living his own life in his own time.

=== Erica's family ===
Gary Strange (John Boylan) – Erica's father. Once a hippie and marijuana enthusiast, he is now a rabbi. He is seen occasionally wearing T-shirts with Jewish-themed phrases such as "I'm With Moses" and "I'm on Shabbat-ical" or Star Trek phrases like "Live Long and Prosper". In Erica's flashbacks, Gary and Barbara were shown to be fighting frequently and barely speaking to one another afterwards. He was married to Barbara Strange, but they divorced a year after Leo's death, partly because he had an affair. With Barbara he had three children: Leo, Erica and Samantha. During season 3 he and Barbara start seeing each other again, as he has always loved her even after their divorce. In the episode "This Be the Verse", a younger Gary is played by Brett Ryan.

Barbara Strange (Kathleen Laskey) – Erica's mother. Her relationship with Erica had been tenuous prior to the series but has improved over the years. Erica believed her mother was the reason for her parents' divorce, when in reality, it was her father's infidelity – a fact which was kept secret from Erica. In order for her to fully understand who Barbara Strange really is, Dr. Tom sends Erica further back to a hippie commune in 1974 where her parents went before they married. Disguised as a hippie, Erica realizes the magnitude of her mother's sacrifice for her father's happiness. She then makes amends with Barbara, who explains that she tried to make her marriage work for her children's sake. Barbara is seen with her new boyfriend, Norm, in "The Unkindest Cut" until he breaks up with her in season three. Barbara reveals she has breast cancer but has since gotten a clean bill of health and celebrates with a new perspective on life. She has a one-night stand with Gary in "Bear Breasts", but has reservations about reconciliation. They are then seen to have reunited once more in "Erica Interrupted". In "Baby Mama" it's revealed that she had a baby when she was seventeen and gave him up for adoption, which she always felt guilty about, but after finally meeting him as an adult named Daniel, he tells her it was the right thing to do and that he had an amazing childhood. In the episodes "This Be the Verse" and "Baby Mama", a younger Barbara is played by Lauren Collins.

Dr. Samantha Rachel "Sam" Strange (formerly McIntosh) (Joanna Douglas) – Erica's younger sister and a surgeon, Josh's longtime girlfriend and ex-wife albeit briefly, and Lenin's current domestic partner. At the start of the series, Sam appears in conservative, drab clothing whenever she is with Josh. However, as the series progressed, she begins to dress more casually after divorcing him. In Season 1, Sam and Erica are close until Erica attempts to dissuade Sam from marrying Josh five minutes before the wedding. In response, Sam refuses to forgive or talk to Erica for several episodes until she returns to Erica for comfort after separating from Josh. In Season 2, Sam leaves Josh and he eventually files for divorce with her counter-filing in response. She enters into a short-lived affair with Kai Booker but finds new love during the third season with janitor Lenin Crosby at her new hospital. In Season 4, Sam appears unexpectedly at Erica's doorstep, announcing that she is pregnant. She later gives birth to a baby boy she names Leo Crosby in honor of her late brother.

Leo Strange (Devon Bostick) – Erica's deceased older brother, who died 13 years before the series begins. His death is Erica's biggest regret. Season 1 finale shows Erica rewriting history, and Leo does not die in the barn. Instead, shortly after she has saved him and returns to an entirely changed present time where she is successful and Leo is an architect, Leo gets in a fatal car accident, as no one is allowed to play God or interfere with the paths of others; only their own. During her group therapy session in "Two Wrongs", Erica travels back to Leo's fraternity pledge for her regret of spending a weekend with a stranger instead of her brother, leading to him dropping out of university. As she corrects her regret with Adam as her traveling companion, Erica learns that Leo had been gang-raped by his fraternity brothers and attacks the leader for the serious crime. Leo reappeared in the third-season penultimate episode as Erica's hallucination as she wakes up back where she started before her therapy. His sister Sam names her first son in his honor. Leo returns one last time as Erica is transported by Dr. Naadiah into a hallway of doors that represents his limbo; each door leads to a different memory of his life, and Leo has been continually revisiting these. Erica tries in vain to convince him that he needs to open the mysterious door at the end of the hallway, which he has been resisting—although he eventually does so, and enters a luminous white light.

Ruby (Dan Redican) – Erica's gay uncle on her mother's side. He owns a successful wedding gown business, White Dreams, where Erica worked for half a day.

Daniel (Landy Cannon) – Erica's half-brother she never knew about. Barbara got pregnant when she was in high school, and gave Daniel away after he was born. She always felt guilty about this, but after finally meeting Daniel he tells her it was the right thing to do and that he had an amazing childhood. He does not meet the rest of the Strange family during the timeframe depicted in the series.

Leo Strange-Crosby – Sam and Lenin's firstborn son, Erica's nephew, and Gary and Barbara's grandson. He was born via home birth, and named in honour of his late uncle.

=== Other therapists ===
The therapists help their patients using an unusual therapy program which involves sending them back in time to events they regret to learn life lessons from their efforts to fix them. Therapists' offices do not have a physical location; when a "session" is about to begin, the patient will usually open a door and unexpectedly enter the office. They also walk in and out of their patients' lives, in various disguises, both in the present and the past, to offer occasional helpful insight.

Dr. Naadiah (Jo Vannicola) – Dr. Tom's therapist, and for a brief time replaces him as Erica's. In "Being Dr. Tom", Dr. Naadiah sends Erica to 1998 in order to give Erica a glimpse of Dr. Tom's pre-therapy life. In "Physician, Heal Thyself" before he became a therapist, Dr. Tom tries to commit suicide only to land in Dr. Naadiah's office for the first time. It is she that helped him become the person that Erica knows to this day. In the season 3 episode "Gettin' Wiggy Wit' It" we briefly see one of her other patients. She is direct, yet calm in her demeanour, although she becomes noticeably more agitated when expressing her concerns about Dr. Tom's behaviour to their supervisor, Dr. Arthur. Her office is large, white, with a simple and very modern decor that Erica describes as "cold". In "Sins of the Father" we see that, unlike Tom, Naadiah puts her personal life before her work as a therapist, with another job, parties, a wife and a daughter.

Dr. Fred (Dewshane Williams) – Kai's therapist, prominently featured only in the second season. He brought Kai and Erica together, by one day "accidentally" spilling her coffee, and recommending Goblins to her. Frustrated by Kai's unwillingness to complete his therapy session, he recruits Erica for help, at the initial annoyance of Dr. Tom. His office is a lush green field surrounded by forest with glass furniture. He reappears in the fourth season and reveals Erica's possible fate in 2019 – she would die in a bombing attack that destroys Union Station, which she later learns that with that knowledge she is able to avoid the attack and survive after being visited and receiving guidance from her future 43-year-old self who is alive and a doctor. He transports Kai back to the future after the latter bids farewell to his one true love.

Dr. Arthur (Graham Greene) – A character who appears to be the supervisor of the other therapists. He is seen interacting with Dr. Naadiah in a couple of episodes, voicing concern on Dr. Tom's unethical behavior such as traveling to the future for information on Erica's fate. He then intervenes in "Physician, Heal Thyself" as Dr. Tom hides behind his work upon seeing his long-absent daughter for the first time. After Dr. Tom lashes out on Erica in particular, Dr. Arthur shows him that history repeats itself because people "fail to learn from [mistakes]". His office is a large, open, brick-style machine shop where he works on a car.

=== Group therapy patients ===
The second stage of Erica's therapy with Dr Tom involves sessions in the style of group therapy with four of Dr Tom's other patients. In group therapy, the patient undergoing a session may select one of their groupmates to accompany them into the past for support and guidance. While group therapy meetings are regularly depicted on the show during this phase of the therapy, actual time travel sessions are depicted only when Erica or Adam (or both) are involved either as the patient or the guest.

Adam Fitzpatrick (Adam Fergus) – Irish-Canadian Adam Fitzpatrick is introduced in Season Three as another time-travel therapy patient. He and Erica quickly develop strong chemistry, sometimes antagonistic. He had an unhappy childhood, where he and his brother John experienced physical abuse from their father and emotional withdrawals from their mother. He spent several years working in organized crime as an enforcer for a loan shark, but left that job and is now working as a labourer with a landscaping company, with new aspirations of studying to become a landscape architect. His traumatic family upbringing has fueled Adam's fear of commitment and penchant for one night stands. In the episode called "The Tribe Has Spoken", Adam meets Beatrice (who was his wife and the mother of his child in an alternate timeline) and asks her out on a date, under the impression of fulfilling his destiny to make a commitment. But by the end of the following episode, Adam breaks up with Beatrice and goes to Erica's apartment to profess his feelings for her. In the episode called "Erica, Interrupted", Adam and Erica finally begin a committed relationship together. During the fourth season, they begin fighting constantly and ultimately break up in "If I Could Turn Back Time". Erica uses her 24-hour time-travel pass to alter her day with Adam without his consent. Tired of her expectations, Adam walks out of her apartment and leaves her in tears. Adam reappears at Dave and Ivan's wedding with a date and awkwardly bumps into Erica. Nevertheless, he reunites with her after she asks for another chance at their relationship. With Jenny's help, Adam and Erica buy a condo and thus begin their new life together as of the series finale.

Rebecca (Melanie Scrofano) – She was an actress who did not make it and now she owns a clothing store in Kensington Market.

Darryl (Jeff Geddis) – Darryl is a quiet man who regrets not standing up to people and taking chances. He is shown to be something of a science nerd. Only one of his regrets is shown over the course of the season; he goes back with Adam and stands up to a group of bullies who stole his Walkman.

Camilla (Kim Roberts) – Camilla is a former alcoholic and a single mother who raised two children and started therapy after she almost ran the bus she was driving into a pole, narrowly avoiding killing her passengers. In a regret she goes on with Erica, she confronts a co-worker who stole so much money that their employer went bankrupt. Of Dr. Tom's five group therapy patients, only Camilla and Erica pass the final test and begin doctor training. As implied by Dr. Tom, Camilla has already graduated and officially becomes a doctor.

=== Other notable characters ===
Brent Kennedy (Morgan Kelly) – Julianne's former assistant and current boyfriend, former editor at River Rock Publishing and current editor at 50/50 Press. He is always well-dressed and well-kept and worked as an underwear model before joining River Rock, leading many people to initially assume (wrongly) that he is gay. He is friendly to Erica, having been in her shoes before. While he sides with Julianne when there is conflict with her and Erica, he helps Erica impress her boss. In Season 2, he becomes antagonistic towards Julianne after she gives the most promising book to Erica to edit instead of him. He then goes behind her back to get her fired by revealing her secret affair with renowned author Thomas Friedken and taking his book away from Julianne. When Erica shows loyalty towards Julianne, Brent decides to take them both down, trying to outshine their performance and get a promotion. By the end of Season Two, Brent Kennedy showed his true colours when he brought down Julianne Giacomelli's reign at River Rock Publishing – and got both her and Erica fired in the process. Season Three explores this darker, more severe side of Brent. As the new editorial director of non-fiction at River Rock Publishing, and fresh off his betrayal of Erica and Julianne – Brent prepares to do everything he can to make 50/50 Press a non-starter, and ensure his steady climb through the publishing world. Throughout the third season, however, he begins to crumble under Friedken's strong-arm tactics and refusal to collaborate with Brent's editing on his new self-help book. Brent then desperately seeks Julianne and Erica's help—allowing them to edit a tell-all memoir, under the condition that they ghost-edit Friedken's book. As shown towards the end of the season, Brent tries to conceal his real reason for ruining Julianne's career, implying that he has been in love with her from the beginning and was jealous of her personal involvement with Friedken. After his employer Frank Galvin dies of a heart attack, Galvin's son Scott takes over and revamps the company, leaving Brent as the odd man out. After much consideration, Brent quits River Rock and joins Julianne and Erica as their editor. He finally professes his love to Julianne, of which she reciprocates, and they begin an official relationship.

Claire LeDuc (Laurence Leboeuf) – Ethan and Erica's college friend, then Ethan's ex-wife. Claire is the daughter of a wealthy francophone industrialist from Montreal, but during her university days she hid her identity, until Erica disclosed it during a time travel, in order to appear more believable in her left-wing activism. In a third season episode, "Movin' On Up", after Erica struggles to move forward without Ethan, members from her group therapy send her back in time to hours before Ethan and Claire's wedding. Claire then reveals to Erica that she is marrying Ethan out of fear of being alone – a moment of truth that later verifies that Erica has made the right choice to break up with him.

Dave (Bill Turnbull) – In the second season, Dave works as a manager at Goblins, and is Kai's boss. In the third season, Kai tells Erica that Dave used to lend him money for groceries and borrow his car when he needed it and in return Kai blew off a gig at Goblins and humiliated Dave. One of Kai's regrets that he comes back to fix is humiliating Dave by blowing off the gig. In the third season, he and his partner Ivan (Michael Northey) buy and renovate the coffee shop, renting out the back to 50/50 Press. They then announce their engagement to marry in front of everyone at Goblins. Bill Turnbull appears in season 1 episode 4 as a bar man presenting a poetry slam while Erica is at college; it is unknown if they are the same character. In one episode, Julianne describes Dave and Ivan, who identify with the bear subculture in gay life, as "looking like Fraggle Rock but sounding like Queer as Folk". Dave and Ivan officially marry in season 4 (episode "Erica's Adventures in Wonderland"). The characters are named after the owners of Temple Street Productions, David Fortier and Ivan Schneeberg.

Katie Atkins (Sarah Gadon) – Despite being attached at the hip since childhood, her friendship with Erica takes a downhill turn in high school after getting fired from Casa Loma for co-hosting an unauthorized Halloween party. They finally make amends in the present day, in the episode "Mi Casa, Su Casa Loma". Katie is a successful newspaper columnist, happily married, living in Vancouver. In the first season she returns to Toronto to publish her first book, The None, at River Rock Publishing where Erica works. In the second season, the character of Katie has been demoted to a recurring one; she only appears for the launch of her book in the episode "What Goes Up Must Come Down".

Josh MacIntosh (Adam MacDonald) – Sam's high school sweetheart and eventual but most briefly husband. Erica finds Josh to be both obnoxious and crass, and he is also shown to be controlling and verbally and emotionally abusive to Sam on several occasions. Erica dislikes Josh because Sam could do far better, and Josh does not truly love her sister. In Season 1, Josh privately reveals to Erica "the heart wants what the heart wants" – he had been in love with Erica from the beginning, and was never quite able to love Sam. Erica, completely turned off, swears him to silence about the truth to protect her sister. In Season 2, Josh makes a one-sided decision for him and Sam to move to London for his new job until his wife finally leaves him without notice. He tries to win her back but to no avail. Sam decides to separate from Josh and he files for divorce with the intent of taking every asset from their marriage. This forces Sam to consult a lawyer and counter-file in response. On very rare occasions, Josh has exposed his vulnerable side to Erica, both directly and indirectly, and has admitted to having originally dated Sam to get closer to Erica. In Season 4, he has returned to Toronto and becomes Erica's first training patient, where she teaches him to be a better person and therefore he amicably parts ways with Sam, which allows her to peacefully move on with her life.

Seth Newman (Fabrizio Filippo) – First appearing in the penultimate episode of season 2, Seth is the author of the first book Erica and Julianne hope to publish together, The Purple Door. He claims to have grown up in and subsequently escaped from a cult which he says are chronicled in The Purple Door. It is later revealed that Seth lied about his experience in the cult, and had been, in fact, an Orthodox Jew named Shimon Nyberg, a fact discovered by Erica accidentally on another patient's regret. Seth tried to write about his true experience in Orthodox Judaism. However, he felt it was not interesting enough and instead he writes a fictitious story and tries to pass it off as an "autobiography". Upon learning of the truth, Erica and Julianne decide to drop him as their author, despite the money they had poured into his launch which nearly broke them, and shred his manuscript that was once considered the jewel of their company. Feeling guilty, Dr. Tom briefly alters time so that Seth never signs with 50/50 Press before Erica convinces him to put everything back.

Lenin Crosby (Brandon Jay McLaren) – Introduced in season three, Lenin is the young, good-looking janitor who works at Samantha's hospital. On the day of her interview, Sam meets Lenin as he helps clean up her shoe which had just gotten stained from wet paint on the door. They then hit it off and strike a romance. Though initially put off by his profession, Sam gradually warms up to Lenin. Unlike her ex-husband Josh, the free-spirited, adventurous Lenin complements the reserved Sam in many ways that benefit their relationship and each other. He is also shown to be a kind, caring, supportive person who stands by Sam, particularly during her divorce proceedings. He and Sam are expecting their first child together and give birth to a baby boy they name Leo after her deceased brother. His parents, Gus and Phoebe, appear in the episode "Baby Mama", played by Anthony Sherwood and Arlene Duncan.

Thomas Friedken (Jeff Seymour) – The author of River Rock's bestselling self-help book The Secret of Now, he had an affair with Julianne, until Erica caught him having sex with a junior employee in the photocopy room. He is generally portrayed as a fast-talking and relentlessly self-promoting charlatan who owes his success more to his ability to bullshit and intimidate people than to any real talent as a self-help guru.

Frank Galvin (David Fox) – The founder, president and CEO of River Rock, he is usually mentioned more than seen, but he does fire Julianne and Erica near the end of Season Two. After he dies of a heart attack in Season Four, the company is taken over by his son Scott (Jefferson Brown), a stereotypical jock whom Brent describes as "Happy Gilmore" and who refocuses the company's publishing projects on male interests such as beer and golf, leading to Brent's departure from the company.

Antigone Kim Morris (Mayko Nguyen) – A woman with whom Erica had an antagonistic relationship as a university student, due to their constant competition to be seen as the smartest student in their literature class. Now a powerful senior editor with Green Row Press, her dismissive attitude when Erica first applies for a job leads Erica to revisit a regret involving a secret society they were both invited to join in university; in season three, she calls Erica with an unsolicited job offer at a time when 50/50 Press' future is hanging in the balance.

Cassidy Holland (Anna Silk) – A lesbian graduate student who was a close friend of Erica's in university. The end of their friendship, after Erica rejected a sexual encounter with Cassidy, is one of the regrets Erica goes back to change; in her session, she accepts Cassidy's advance but finds that the decision serves only to reconfirm her heterosexuality. Ultimately, Erica learns that the end of their friendship came not because she chose not to have sex with Cassidy, but because she felt too awkward to talk to Cassidy about it afterward; doing so in her session, she then returns to a new present in which she and Cassidy did remain in touch after Cassidy moved to England for her post-doctoral work, and Cassidy subsequently returns for a visit during Pride Week. She also occasionally appears as a minor player in some of Erica's other university-era sessions.

Rachel (Jadyn Wong) – A new editorial assistant at 50/50 Press in Season 4. Julianne initially dislikes her, leading to a confrontation when her unsolicited book suggestion triggers Julianne's intellectual insecurities, but is ultimately won over by Rachel's competence the same way she once was with Erica; she gives Rachel the affectionate pet name "Ray Ray". A recent university graduate, Rachel is quirky and has psychic abilities—correctly deducing that Brent and Julianne are dating after witnessing a mere glance between them, sometimes finishing Julianne's sentences, and feeling a cold frisson of death several minutes before 50/50 receives a phone call informing them of Frank Galvin's fatal heart attack.

Sarah Wexlar (Tatiana Maslany) – Dr. Tom's long-missing, heroin-addicted daughter and now Dr. Erica's first official patient. Along with her father, Sarah comes from a highbrow, elite family who pressured her to follow in their footsteps instead of her dreams. Throughout the series, she serves as a catalyst for Dr. Tom when she ran away from home in 1996 after their last fight in the park. Her parents wanted her to consider commerce for her career, but she wished to become a painter. Their relationship became strained as Sarah began using heroin and dropped her dream of becoming an artist. Since becoming a therapist, her father has been looking for her, hoping to find her alive. She returns in the third season after a long absence under the guise of seeking her parents' help, only to rob them blind once more. Sarah ends up in prison as a result. At first faceless in Dr. Erica's visions, Sarah hits rock bottom once more after overdosing on heroin and ending up in the hospital. Dr. Erica meets Sarah for the first time as her therapist and hands her a business card, mirroring her own first encounter with Dr. Tom, Sarah's father.

Jay Manuel (himself) – At a time when 50/50 Press is in danger due to the loss of The Purple Door, Brent—in an attempt to make amends after betraying Julianne at River Rock—goes behind Frank Galvin's back to bring Julianne and Erica a guaranteed bestseller, a "scandalous tell-all memoir" by an old friend from his earlier career in modelling. The friend is revealed to be celebrity fashion journalist Jay Manuel, and the gesture is successful in saving 50/50 Press and in beginning to mend Julianne and Brent's relationship.

== Production and background ==
Temple Street Productions filmed the series in Toronto. The pilot episode was shot in November 2007, while the rest of Season One was shot from July through December 2008.

In the show's final season, Being Erica faced some criticism for several examples of product placement which appeared awkward or poorly executed. In one episode, Julianne decided (seemingly arbitrarily) to quit drinking her trademark lattés, and Rachel repeatedly offered her Tetley Infusions iced tea as a substitute; during the summer hiatus before the fourth season aired, Tetley Infusions sponsored a contest whose prize was a trip to Toronto to visit the set of Being Erica.

In another episode, the cold open essentially situated Erica and Julianne in an extended commercial for the 2012 Ford Focus, with Erica and Julianne test driving the car while a salesman in the back seat explained its features and selling points; the scene's only narrative connection to the rest of the episode came in the form of Erica occasionally weighing whether or not to buy it (which she ultimately did.) National Post arts journalist Jessica Leigh Johnston wrote that this episode was effectively the end of the show for her, writing that "I didn't actually make it to the finale. I broke up with Erica, my TV BFF, because she tried way too hard to sell me a car." In the weekly episode recap on its entertainment blog "The Hype", Toronto Life called it "the most blatant example of in-show advertising we've ever witnessed (even more than Julianne's legendary love of Tetley Infusions)", and opined that the scene went on for so long that it almost seemed as though the car was going to be Erica's patient for the week.

In addition, McCain Foods sponsored a viewer contest whose winner would appear as a non-speaking extra eating a slice of McCain's pizza in a Season 5 episode of Being Erica, several months after the fact that the show was concluding production at the end of Season 4 had already been announced. The contest was subsequently revised to offer an alternate prize "in the event that Being Erica is not renewed for the fall 2012 season".

== Adaptations ==
Television producers in both the United States and the United Kingdom announced plans in 2010 to produce new adaptations of Being Erica in their respective countries.

The British version, to be produced by Big Talk Productions and titled You Again, was to be set in Glasgow and would focus on an NHS worker named Zoe. The lead writer was announced as Nicole Taylor (Ashes to Ashes and Secret Diary of a Call Girl), while Being Erica creator Jana Sinyor and producer Aaron Martin would serve as consultants.

On December 16, 2010, ABC announced plans to produce an American remake of Being Erica. Maggie Friedman was to be the writer for the show's pilot.

On December 10, 2020, it was announced that Allison Williams would star in and serve as an executive producer for an American remake being produced by Boat Rocker Studios. No network was then attached to the project.

== Reception ==
The pilot episode had an estimated overnight audience of nearly 600,000 viewers, later confirmed by BBM Nielsen Media Research to be 615,000 viewers.

In the Netherlands, Being Erica premiered with 398,000 viewers with a market share of 5.9%. The rest of the season had a market share of 5.5% according to Stichting KijkOnderzoek. Being Erica was pulled off the schedule on Net 5 after the 10th episode to make room for 90210 and Gossip Girl. The remaining episodes began airing October 10. The series hit an all-time low when it returned on Net 5 but became stable after the second episode. Since January 2010 there has not been a new episode in the Netherlands because the ratings dropped dramatically in the second half of the second season. The DVD of season 2 was distributed by the BBC instead of Net 5, who released the first season on DVD. The sales did well so the BBC decided to release the third season as well in the Netherlands, even though the third season did not air.

In the UK, Being Erica was broadcast on E4. The first season premiered on September 28, 2009, and ended on December 14, 2009. The second season began airing on Monday, June 21, 2010, at 10 pm but was suddenly shifted to a 12:10 am graveyard slot after only four weeks. Seasons 3 and 4 were broadcast similarly, with season 4 episodes shown only once, in pairs after midnight.

=== Ratings ===
Season	Timeslot (EDT)	Network	Season premiere	Season finale	TV season	Average no. of viewers Canada	Average no. of viewers Netherlands	Average no. of viewers USA
1	Monday 9:00 pm (January 5, 2009 – February 2, 2009); Wednesday 9:00 pm (February 11, 2009 – April 1, 2009)	CBC	January 5, 2009	April 1, 2009	2009	580,000	316,000	500,000
2	Tuesday 9:00 pm (September 22, 2009 – December 8, 2009)	CBC	September 22, 2009	December 8, 2009	2009	582,000	225,000	3,000,000
3	Tuesday 9:00 pm (September 21, 2010 – October 12, 2010); Wednesday 9:00 pm (October 20, 2010 – December 15, 2010)	CBC	September 21, 2010	December 15, 2010	2010	408,750		
4	Monday 9:00pm	CBC	September 26, 2011	December 12, 2011	2011	307,000		

== Setting ==
The show is primarily set in Toronto. As such it features many landmarks and themes related to the city. Some roads are assigned different names from those that they have in reality.

Toronto appears frequently in American productions disguised as various US cities. For Being Erica, the producers wanted Toronto to appear as itself, and to showcase the highlights of the city in a way that had not been seen before.

== Soundtrack ==
EMI Canada released Being Erica (Music from the Original Series) on September 22, 2009, in Canada.

1. Lily Frost – "All I Ever Wanted (Theme)"
2. Melanie Doane – "Every Little Thing"
3. The Cast of Being Erica – "Single and Unemployed"
4. Blind Melon – "No Rain"
5. The Northern Pikes – "Girl with a Problem"
6. The Cast of Being Erica – "The Answer Is"
7. Jesus Jones – "Right Here, Right Now"
8. The Cast of Being Erica – "Collective Disapproval"
9. Images in Vogue – "Lust for Love"
10. The Cast of Being Erica – "Yes or No"
11. Roz Bell – "Yesterday Man (I'm So Lonely)"
12. Norah Jones – "Don't Know Why"
13. Marc Jordan – "Rhythm of My Heart"
14. The Cast of Being Erica – "You Just Have To Decide"
15. Stars – "Reunion"
16. Right Said Fred – "I'm Too Sexy"
17. Fatboy Slim – "Praise You"
18. The Cast of Being Erica – "Hot Dog Vendor"
19. MC Hammer – "U Can't Touch This"
20. The Cast of Being Erica – "Snowflakes"
21. Justin Hines – "Another Way to Cry"
22. The Cast of Being Erica – "Girls Just Wanna Have Fun!"
23. Lily Frost – "All I Ever Wanted (Being Erica Theme Song)"

== DVD releases ==
Entertainment One has released the first three seasons of Being Erica on DVD in Region 1 (Canada only). The fourth and final season was released on June 19, 2012.

Season 1 DVD cover (Region 1)

In Region 2, Season 1 was released on DVD in the Netherlands on June 26, 2009. In the UK, the DVD was released on June 28, 2010.

In Region 4, ABC DVD/Roadshow Entertainment has released the first 3 seasons on DVD in Australia. Season 4 was released on April 5, 2012.

DVD name	Ep #	Release dates		
DVD name	Ep #	Region 1 Canada	Region 2 Netherlands	Region 4 Australia
Season One	13	September 22, 2009 (Note: Region 0 in Canada rather than Region 1.)	June 26, 2009	November 9, 2009
Season Two	12	September 14, 2010	July 13, 2010	June 3, 2010
Season Three	13	October 18, 2011	July 1, 2011	July 7, 2011
Season Four	11	June 19, 2012	September 25, 2012	April 5, 2012
