= Video Hits =

Video Hits may refer to either of two television series devoted to music videos:

- Video Hits (Australian TV series) aired from 1987 until 2011
- Video Hits (Canadian TV series) aired from 1984 until 1993
