= Rock Wars =

- Genre: Variety
- Starring: Brad Giffen
- Country of origin: Canada
- No. of seasons: 1

Production
- Production locations: Vancouver, British Columbia

Original release
- Network: CBC Television
- Release: February 1, 1985 – May 1985

Rock Wars is a Canadian television variety show that aired in 1985 on CBC Television. A national "battle of the bands" competition, the series featured unsigned musical groups competing in a series of regional concerts held in various cities across Canada, with the winner of each episode advancing to another round of competition until the ultimate winner was named at a final concert staged in Vancouver, British Columbia.

Hosted by Brad Giffen, the program aired on Friday nights as a companion to the network's music video program Good Rockin' Tonite. Judges over the course of the series included Keith Sharp of Music Express, Samantha Taylor of CBC's Video Hits and CFNY-FM program director David Marsden.

The winner of the competition was to receive a half-hour CBC Television special devoted to the band, as well as a cash prize of CA$100,000.

The series was won by Tchukon, a funk and rhythm and blues band from Montreal, Quebec, over finalists Eye Eye, HB Concept and Peter Mann and the Lonely. Other competitors over the course of the series included Monuments Galore, The Instructions, The Rage, The Stilettos, Eight Seconds, The Waiting, Haywire, Mad Shadows, Steps Around the House, Apple Viper, Zlatko and The Micah Barnes Band.

Tchukon later went on to win Best Vocal Group in the 1986 edition of the American series Star Search.
