= Pepsi Power Hour =

Canadian music television program

The Pepsi Power Hour was a live one-hour program that aired on the MuchMusic television channel in Canada from 1986 to 1991. It ran once weekly every Thursday, until 1989 when a Tuesday hour was added. The show was dedicated to hard rock and heavy metal music videos, and showcased a variety of well and lesser-known artists. It balanced coverage of major international acts, with newer bands, and a variety of Canadian acts both major label and independent. For example, members of Canadian bands such as Brighton Rock, Helix, and Triumph were invited to co-host the show. On other installments, independent artists such as Mif from Slash Puppet were brought in for live, in-studio interview segments. International artists also often co-hosted, such as Iron Maiden, Rob Halford, and Motörhead.

The format of the program varied, but in general, it was hosted live by one of MuchMusic's VJ's. The VJ would play new and old metal videos, taped interviews, play requests, and go over recent metal news. Fans were encouraged to write in requests every week, and the most creative of which were often shown. The show offered contests, for prizes such as meeting or interviewing bands, or for rare merchandise. Frequently, episodes would feature live interviews with artists in or outside the MuchMusic studio. Occasionally, artists would also perform songs live in the studio. A notable example was Rik Emmett, who co-hosted an episode and played the then-new Triumph single "Let the Light (Shine on Me)" acoustically before jamming with his co-writer Sil Simone in a guitar battle. Emmett was later brought back to co-host a special episode entitled "The Axemen Cometh", which showcased popular guitar soloists of the time.

In the late 1980s, Muchmusic released a series of compilation albums based on their various specialty shows, two Power Hour albums were released, featuring artists such as Iron Maiden, Accept, Megadeth, Kick Axe and more.

In 1991, the Power Hour was replaced by the Power 30, an every-weekday program with a scaled-down half-hour time slot. While this meant more music each week, it also meant the end of one-hour special programs focusing on a single artist. A spiritual successor to the Power Hour, entitled Loud, aired on MuchMusic and its namesake specialty channel MuchLoud from 1998 to 2011, with George Stroumboulopoulos hosting in early seasons, and an increased focus on extreme metal genres.

== Hosts ==
- John "J.D." Roberts
- Erica Ehm
- Steve Anthony
- Dan Gallagher
- Laurie Brown
- Michael Williams
- Teresa Roncon

== Occasional hosts ==
- Christopher Ward
- Daniel Richler
- Terry David Mulligan
- Denise Donlon
