= Good Rockin' Tonite =

Canadian music television series

- Terry David Mulligan hosting Good Rockin' Tonite in 1984
- Presented by: Terry David Mulligan (1983-1985); Stu Jeffries (1985-1993)
- Country of origin: Canada

Original release
- Network: CBC Television
- Release: October 8, 1983 – April 3, 1993

For the song, see Good Rocking Tonight.

Good Rockin' Tonite is a Canadian television program airing on CBC Television from 1983 to 1993. The program, similar to the American Friday Night Videos, played popular music videos, and also featured interviews with musicians, viewer contests and a countdown of the week's most popular singles and albums across Canada. Along with CBC's daily daytime music video program Video Hits, the programs represented the only options for Canadian viewers of the mid-1980s to see music video programming outside of cable TV.

The show premiered on October 8, 1983. The program's original host was Terry David Mulligan, who left to join the nascent MuchMusic in 1985. He was replaced by Stu Jeffries, who hosted for the remainder of the show's run.

It was produced at the studios of CBUT in Vancouver, British Columbia. When Jeffries was first hired to host the program, he was simultaneously working as program director of radio station CJME in Regina, Saskatchewan, and flew to Vancouver every Friday to tape the program. He later gave up the Regina job and moved to Vancouver.

The show generally aired Friday nights at 11:30 p.m. on CBC Television's owned-and-operated stations, but was delayed to a weekend airing on some of the network's private affiliates. Initially airing for 90 minutes per episode, the show was trimmed to 60 minutes in 1986 due to budget cutbacks at the CBC.

For part of the 1984-85 season, the series aired alongside the companion program Rock Wars, a national "battle of the bands" competition hosted by Brad Giffen. In the summer of 1987, the series was temporarily bumped to midnight to make room for the short run series It's Only Rock & Roll. In 1989, the show was briefly moved to Thursday nights, with its Friday night time slot taken over by Pilot One, but returned to Fridays after the latter show's cancellation.

The show's cancellation was announced by the CBC in February 1993, and its final episode aired on April 3. (Video Hits, the CBC's other music video show, aired its last program the day before, after eight years on weekday afternoons.)

The show's famous catch phrase, used by both hosts, derived from the lyrics of the song with the same name, was "Have you heard the news? There's been Good Rockin' Tonite!"
