= Ear to the Ground (TV program) =

Canadian music television program

Ear to the Ground is a Canadian music television program that was broadcast on CBC Television from 1992 to 1995. Focusing on a single Canadian musician or band each week, the series mixed interview segments and live performance clips in a documentary style. It was a spinoff of the network's daily program Video Hits, which had in its final years sometimes devoted special episodes to a single musician or band under the name Video Hits Presents. The series was produced by Faith Feingold and directed and written by Faith Feingold and Marla Digiacomo.

Although artists across all popular music genres were featured, the show was considered especially effective and important as a showcase for artists in genres such as country or folk, which did not typically have high rotation on MuchMusic. The program format was hostless; Karen Gordon of CBC Radio's The Entertainers did the majority of the intros, and Dan Gallagher a few other intros.

The program premiered on June 21, 1992, with an episode devoted to Barenaked Ladies. Other artists profiled on the series during its run included Sloan, Eric's Trip, Meryn Cadell, Kashtin, Skydiggers, Lost Dakotas, The Rankin Family, Bob Wiseman, Me Mom and Morgentaler, The Lowest of the Low, Vern Cheechoo, Blue Rodeo, Punjabi by Nature, Tom Jackson, The Barra MacNeils, Big Rude Jake, Ashley MacIsaac, Change of Heart, hHead, Lori Yates, Moist, Susan Aglukark, Bob Snider, Patricia Conroy and Bourbon Tabernacle Choir.

The program was cancelled in April 1995, on the grounds that the live performance aspect of the show was now partially duplicated by the network's variety show Rita and Friends. In its place, CBC launched the new program Music Works.

== Awards ==
At the 7th Gemini Awards in 1993, Barenaked Ladies won the award for Best Performance in a Performing Arts Program or Series for their episode. At the 9th Gemini Awards in 1995, the series was nominated for Best Music Variety Program or Series.
