= Alex Karzis =

Canadian singer, songwriter, & musician (born 1975)

- Born: Constantine Alexander Karzis; June 8, 1975 (age 51); Toronto, Ontario, Canada
- Occupations: Actor, singer, songwriter, musician

External image
- Alex Karzis IMDb photo

Constantine Alexander Karzis (born June 8, 1975) is a Canadian film and television actor, voiceover artist, singer, and musician. He was born and raised in Toronto, Ontario.

== Life ==
He played the roles of Bruce in the 1993 film I Love a Man in Uniform, Dante Carfanini in the television series Street Legal, two episodes of the television show Friday the 13th: The Series.

As a musician, he writes, sings lead, and plays bass in the Wilco-inspired alternative rock band The Giant Baby. As well, he performs in the extremely popular Beatles tribute group The Rattles, where he inhabits the character of Paul McCartney, which tours extensively. He has as well been an integral member of other musical groups as well, including ThirtyThree, and The New Black whose music is available on iTunes and digital streaming sites. With The New Black, he went on a successful tour of China in '06

Over the past 5 years, Karzis has been painting canvasses of all sizes in both acrylics and oils. His studies include pieces in Abstract Realism, as well classical forms. His policy for selling paintings is that they are all priced @ $5000 O.B.O. (Or Best Offer). Thus far he has had much success with his art, especially his cat studies

Karzis has played many great characters, including recent work in Gangster Exchange (2008) and The Cry of the Owl (2009). More recently he has been featured in Orphan Black, The Expanse, Rogue, and Eyewitness. He also loves working in theatre and has most recently appeared in The Container and Glengarry Glen Ross

Constantine Alexander Karzis is of Greek descent. He has roots in the Peloponnese and the Greek islands of Hydra and Crete. He has a son who is pursuing two post secondary degrees in Music and Physics

Karzis is working on a new collection of songs, images, and poems thought to be ready soon.

== Television ==
- Friday the 13th: The Series (2 episodes, 1988–1989)
  - "And Now the News" (1988) - Craig
  - "The Prisoner" (1989) - Woody Reese
- Legal (1 episode, 1989)
- Magi-Nation - Zed
- Cyberchase (two episodes) as Ledge, the villain that turns against Hacker after being rejected.
- Connor Undercover (two episodes) as The Magician, an enemy informant with no allegiance.
- The Famous Jett Jackson A rude, cocky / named Beauregard

== Filmography ==
- I Love a Man in Uniform (1993) - Bruce
- Stalked (1994) - Tony
- Face Down (1997) -
- Blind Faith (1998) -
- Chasing Cain (2001)
- Jane Doe (2001) -
- The Circle (2001) -
- You Belong to Me (2001) -
- Global Heresy (2002) -
- Detention (2003) - Chester Lamb
- Direct Action (2004) -
- Hustle (2004) - Ron Delaplane
- For Lease (2007) - Rob Marco
- Gangster Exchange (2008)
- The Cry of the Owl (2009) - Robert's Lawyer
