= It's Only Rock & Roll (TV series) =

Canadian variety show

- Country of origin: Canada
- No. of episodes: 13

Production
- Producer: Joe Bodolai
- Production company: Insight Productions

Original release
- Network: CBC Television
- Release: 1987

It's Only Rock & Roll is a Canadian variety show, which aired on CBC Television as a summer series in 1987. Produced by Joe Bodolai and directed by Allan Novak, Henry Sarwer-Foner and Joan Tosoni, the program mixed rock music-themed comedy sketches with live performances by real musicians.

The program premiered in prime time, before moving to its regular time slot on Friday nights at 11:30 p.m. as a companion to the network's music video program Good Rockin' Tonite.

Personalities associated with the show included Ted Woloshyn, Dan Gallagher and Taborah Johnson as hosts, with comedians from The Second City's Toronto cast, including Dana Andersen, Bob Bainborough and Mike Myers, in the comedy sketches. Myers later took several of his recurring characters from the show to Saturday Night Live, including Wayne from Wayne's World and Dieter from Sprockets.

The series won the award for Best Comedy or Variety Series at the 1988 Gemini Awards.
