= John Roberts (journalist) =

Canadian television journalist (born 1956)

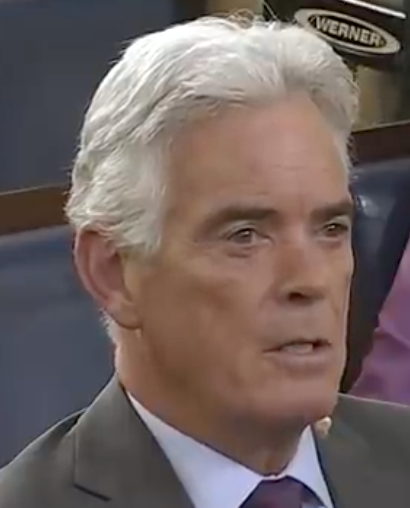
- Roberts in 2020
- Born: John David Robertson; November 15, 1956 (age 70); Toronto, Ontario, Canada
- Other name: J. D. Roberts
- Citizenship: Canada; United States
- Education: University of Toronto (BA)
- Occupations: News reporter, television anchor, journalist
- Years active: 1975–present
- Spouses: Michelle (div. 2008): Kyra Phillips
- Children: 4

John David Roberts (born John David Robertson; November 15, 1956) is a Canadian-American television journalist. He has been working for the Fox News Channel, as the co-anchor of America Reports. Roberts joined Fox News in January 2011 as a national correspondent based in Atlanta. He was the Fox News Chief White House Correspondent from 2017 to 2021, covering the first Donald Trump presidency.

Roberts started his career in Southern Ontario, Canada in 1975, working at various radio stations in entertainment and news, before moving to television with CITY-TV and MuchMusic. Roberts first moved to the States in 1989 to join the Miami CBS affiliate. In 1990, he returned to Canada to host the CTV Canada AM national morning show. Roberts then returned to the States, joining CBS News in 1992 and later moved to CNN in 2006. At CBS, Roberts was an anchor on various national news programs, an anchor at their New York affiliate WCBS-TV, and White House correspondent. At CNN, Roberts was an anchor and Senior National Correspondent.

In 2009, Roberts was inducted into the Canadian Broadcast Hall of Fame.

== Early life ==
Roberts was born in Toronto, Ontario, and grew up in Mississauga, Ontario. He attended Erindale Secondary School and Lorne Park Secondary School and later Erindale College at the University of Toronto, where he worked at the campus radio station, CFRE-FM.

== Career ==
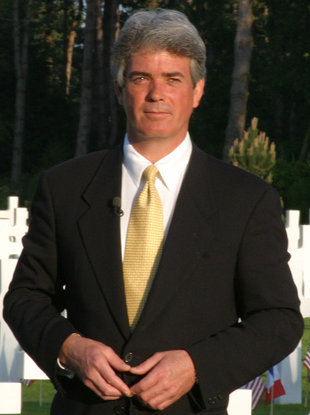
Roberts in 2004

Roberts was born John Robertson but shortened his professional name so as not to be confused with his uncle John Robertson, who was then a Canadian sports reporter and columnist.

=== Local radio ===
He first started working in radio at the local college station, CFRE-FM in Mississauga. His first professional job was as reporter and news anchor with CFOS in Owen Sound, Ontario, in 1975.

From there, Roberts went to CHYM in Kitchener, where he worked as a newsman and DJ, then worked on-air for radio station CJBK in London, Ontario, in 1977, before moving back to Toronto to join top 40 powerhouse CHUM later that year as a weekday evening disc jockey. 1050 CHUM and CITY-TV gave him the on-air name J. D. Roberts.

=== CITY-TV and MuchMusic ===
In 1979, he branched out from his radio work to co-host with Jeanne Beker the music newsmagazine The NewMusic on CITY-TV until 1985. The New Music was a pioneering program that pre-dated MTV. Roberts, Beker and the New Music team won many awards for their work. During that time, Roberts also served as Entertainment reporter for CITY-TV and on occasion filled in for John Majhor and later Brad Giffen on CITY-TV's local music video show Toronto Rocks. In 1984, Roberts was tapped to front Canada's music channel MuchMusic. He and Christopher Ward were the first on-air personalities appearing when the network launched in 1984. At MuchMusic he hosted many programs, including a one-hour heavy metal video show called The Power Hour.

In 1987, Roberts left MuchMusic to anchor CITY-TV's CityPulse and became anchor of the 10 pm CityPulse Tonight when Anne Mroczkowski moved from anchoring that newscast to join Gord Martineau on the 6 pm edition.

=== WCIX ===
Between 1989 and 1990 Roberts was an anchor and reporter for WCIX (now WFOR-TV), the CBS-owned and operated television station in Miami, Florida.

=== CTV ===
Roberts returned to Canada in September 1990 to co-host the national CTV morning show Canada AM, initially with Deborah McGregor, and later with Pamela Wallin.

=== CBS ===
In 1992, Roberts moved to CBS News in New York. His initial assignment was anchoring the CBS Morning News with co-anchor Meredith Vieira. Roberts was also the news reader and substitute anchor for Harry Smith on CBS This Morning and The Early Show. From 1994 to 1995 Roberts anchored the 5pm and 11pm newscasts at CBS's flagship station in New York, WCBS-TV. In March 1995, he moved back to the CBS Network as anchor of the CBS Sunday Evening News, remaining in that position for nearly 11 years. He also anchored the CBS Saturday Evening News from February 1999 until he became CBS chief White House Correspondent in August 1999.

Roberts served as chief White House Correspondent at CBS from August 1999 to February 2006 and regularly anchored a Sunday-afternoon 3pm ET newscast for the CBS Radio Network. In March 2003, Roberts was embedded with the 2nd Light Armored Reconnaissance Battalion of the U.S. Marines during the initial invasion of Iraq.

On July 19, 2005, he introduced CBS's coverage on the announcement of the nomination of John Roberts for the Supreme Court of the United States. He jokingly asked colleagues to refer to him as "Your Honor" because he and Justice Roberts bear the same name.

He had been widely considered a potential replacement for CBS Evening News anchor Dan Rather after Rather stepped down from the anchor desk in March 2005, but Bob Schieffer was chosen on an interim basis to be the next CBS Evening News anchor, and in subsequent months, it became clear that Roberts was not under consideration for the job. During his time at CBS, Roberts received three nationals Emmy awards as well as a Gracie award for his coverage of a groundbreaking surgery to repair neural tube defects.

=== CNN ===
In February 2006, Roberts left CBS and joined CNN. In July 2006 and August 2006, Roberts reported from the front lines in the Israel/Hezbollah war and at one point, embedded with an Israeli infantry unit, marching 10 miles into Lebanon. Roberts was recognized with a Headline Award for that embed. CNN's coverage of the war was recognized with an Edward R. Murrow Award.

In October 2006, he returned to Iraq as the first anchor of This Week at War and served as the Senior National Correspondent based in Washington. He has also substituted for Anderson Cooper on Anderson Cooper 360°. Roberts was co-anchor of CNN's morning program American Morning from 2007 to 2010. He anchored from New York. In 2010, American Morning was nominated for "best morning program" at the Daytime Emmy Awards, losing to Good Morning America.

The Associated Press reported that Roberts' departure from American Morning was at his request so he could move closer to fiancée and CNN anchor Kyra Phillips.

=== Fox News ===
Executives at CNN confirmed on January 3, 2011, that Roberts would be leaving CNN to join Fox News as a national correspondent, based in Atlanta.

Roberts reported on numerous breaking news events including the murder trial of real estate heir Robert Durst, the U.S. Ebola outbreak, the 2013 EF5 tornado in Moore, Oklahoma, and the aftermath of Hurricane Irene in 2011 as well continuing his coverage of American politics.

In an August 2016 sexual harassment lawsuit against Fox News, Andrea Tantaros claimed that Roberts, Scott Brown, and Bill O'Reilly sexually harassed her. The case was dismissed.

In January 2017, Roberts became chief White House correspondent for Fox News, covering the activities of US President Donald Trump. Roberts garnered significant attention in 2020 for criticizing the Trump presidency's hostility with the media and its failure to properly inform the media. Following the first presidential debate in the 2020 elections, Roberts got into a heated exchange with press secretary Kayleigh McEnany over the president's failure to explicitly denounce white supremacy. During the press briefing, Roberts frustratedly told McEnany to "stop deflecting, stop blaming the media", to which he received much backlash, prompting controversy over the subject in the media and among politicians.

In October 2020, Fox News announced that Roberts had signed a multi-year contract extension and that he would remain with Fox News for the coming years.

On January 14, 2021, Fox News announced that Roberts was being promoted to an anchor position, with a 1-3 pm show entitled America Reports. Peter Doocy took Roberts' former position as the White House correspondent during the Joe Biden administration.

On October 18, 2021, Roberts tweeted that the death of Colin Powell, who died at the age of 84 as a result of complications due to COVID-19 despite being fully vaccinated, raised "new concerns" about the long-term efficacy of vaccines. His tweet was criticized for not taking into account Powell's age and health history, which reportedly included a diagnosis of multiple myeloma, a type of blood cancer that weakens the body's ability to protect against infections. Roberts eventually deleted the tweet, subsequently saying he did so because the tweet was interpreted as "anti-vax", when "it was not".

== Personal life ==
Divorced in 2008 from his high school sweetheart with whom he shares two children, John Roberts announced his engagement to Kyra Phillips on April 25, 2010. They have twin children named Sage Ann and Kellan Clay. As of 2018, the couple are married. Roberts is a dual Canadian and American citizen.
