= Jonathan Watton =

Canadian actor

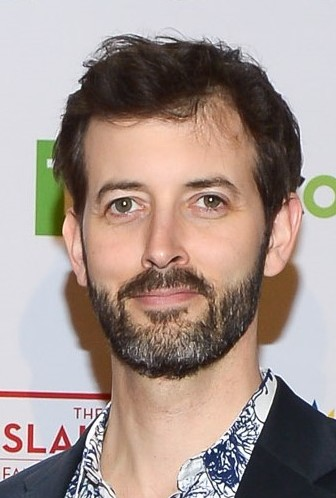
- Jonathan Watton, February 2017
- Born: Corner Brook, Newfoundland and Labrador, Canada
- Occupation: Actor
- Years active: 1999–present

Jonathan Watton is a Canadian actor. He is best known for playing the role of Darcy Garland in Murdoch Mysteries. He has a recurring role in The Handmaid's Tale as Matthew Calhoun. He also directed the short films Last of the Snow (2012) and The Pamplemousse (2013).

== Filmography ==
=== Films ===
Year	Title	Role	Notes
2000	The Crossing	Cadman	TV film
2001	Haven	Henry	TV film
2001	On the Line	Paul	
2003	Absolon	Man on Phone / Technician	
2004	A Hole in One	Bobby Watson	
2004	The Messiah: Prophecy Fulfilled	Yosef	
2005	Four Minutes	Hamilton	TV film
2006	Between Truth and Lies	John Walters	TV film
2007	Breach	Geddes	
2007	They Come Back	Mason	TV film
2008	Just Business	David Gray	
2010	Perfect Plan	Garrett Crawford	TV film
2012	A Dark Truth	Caller	
2013	A Trip to the Island	Hero	
2014	Maps to the Stars	Sterl Carruth	
2014	The Calling	Father Glendinning	
2017	XX	Robert Jacobs	
2019	Spinster	Will	
2024	Sharp Corner	Dr. Peter Murphy	

=== Television ===
Year	Title	Role	Notes
1999	Little Men	Grayson	1 Episode
2002	The Associates	Simon Tassel	4 Episodes
2003	Sue Thomas: F.B.Eye	Ryan	1 Episode
2003	Mutant X	Billy Larkin	1 Episode
2005	G-Spot	Misha	1 Episode
2005	Wild Card	Hugh	1 Episode
2006	1-800-Missing	Eric Dubin	1 Episode
2006	Masters of Horror	Bruce Sweetland	1 Episode
2008	Supernatural	Paul Dutton	1 Episode
2011	Republic of Doyle	Alex Pittman	1 Episode
2011	Covert Affairs	Cameron	1 Episode
2011	Murdoch Mysteries	Dr. Darcy Garland	14 Episodes
2012	Wrath of Grapes: The Don Cherry Story II	Ron Maclean	1 Episode
2012	Good God	Tim Hailwood	7 Episodes
2013	The Listener	Nicholas D'Angelo	1 Episode
2014	Lost Girl	Hugin	1 Episode
2014	Saving Hope	Carl	1 Episode
2015	Reign	Ridley	2 Episodes
2019-2021	The Handmaid's Tale	Commander Matthew Calhoun	7 Episodes
