= That Was Then =

Television series

- Genre: Drama
- Created by: Dan Cohn; Jeremy Miller
- Written by: Dan Cohn; Ellen Herman; Jeremy Miller; Mark B. Perry; J. J. Philbin; Nelson Soler; Tom Spezialy
- Directed by: Kevin Dowling; Bryan Gordon; Alan Myerson; Peter O'Fallon
- Starring: James Bulliard; Jeffrey Tambor; Bess Armstrong; Tricia O'Kelley
- Opening theme: "Do It Again" by The Kinks
- Composers: David Was; Don Was
- Country of origin: United States
- Original language: English
- No. of seasons: 1
- No. of episodes: 8 (6 unaired)

Production
- Executive producers: Dan Cohn; Jeff Kline; Jeremy Miller
- Producer: Ron French
- Cinematography: Jerome Fauci; Scott Williams
- Running time: 60 minutes
- Production companies: Brookline Productions; Lemonade Stand Productions; Touchstone Television

Original release
- Network: ABC
- Release: September 27 – October 4, 2002

That Was Then is an American drama television series that was broadcast on ABC September 27 to October 4, 2002. It was cancelled after only two episodes had aired.

== Synopsis ==
The series starred James Bulliard as Travis Glass, a 30-year-old who finds his life in a rut. Still living at home with his mother (Bess Armstrong) he works as a door-to-door salesman. The girl of his dreams, played by Kiele Sanchez, is married to his older brother, Gregg, played by Brad Raider. Travis is able to trace his life's downward spiral to a single week in high school in 1988. After telling his best friend, played by Tyler Labine, that he wished for a second chance to make everything right, he lies in bed listening to the song "Do It Again" by The Kinks, when a bolt of lightning hits his house, and an electrical jolt sends him back to that week in 1988. Glass tries to correct things that originally went wrong, but finds his new life isn't quite to his expectations, and must return from the past.

It was compared to The WB series with a similar premise, Do Over.

== Cast ==
- James Bulliard as Travis Glass
- Bess Armstrong as Mickey Glass
- Brad Raider as Gregg "Quad G" Glass
- Kiele Sanchez as Claudia Wills
- Tyler Labine as Donnie Pinkus
- Tricia O'Kelley as Sophie Frisch
- Andrea Bowen as Zooey Glass
- Jeffrey Tambor as Gary "Double G" Glass

== Episodes ==
No.	Title	Directed by	Written by	Original release date
1	"The Thirty-Year Itch"	Peter O'Fallon	Jeremy Miller & Daniel Cohn	September 27, 2002
2	"Mayor May Not"	Alan Myerson	Jeremy Miller & Daniel Cohn	October 4, 2002
3	"Under Noah's Certain Terms"	TBD	TBD	Unaired
4	"A Rock and a Head Case"	TBD	TBD	Unaired
