= Slash Puppet =

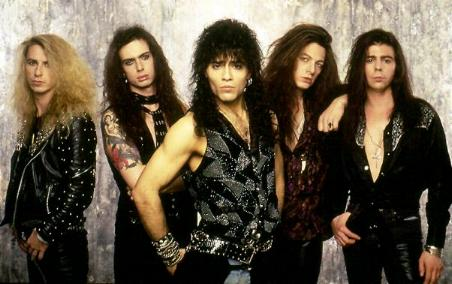
- From left to right: Pete Dove, Franklin Wyles, Mif, Lou Garscadden, Frank Bartoletti

Background information
- Origin: Toronto, Ontario, Canada
- Genres: Rock, hard rock, heavy metal
- Years active: 1989–1995
- Labels: Fringe Records, Suncity Records, Epidemic Records
- Past members: Mif; Lou Garscadden; Frank Bartoletti; Franklin Wyles; Pete Dove; Dave Carreiro; Marcel Lafleur

Slash Puppet were a Canadian hard rock band that debuted in Toronto in 1989. The group originally consisted of lead vocalist Mif, guitarists Lou Garscadden and Frank Bartoletti, bassist Pete Dove and drummer Franklin Wyles. In 1992 Dave Carreiro joined the band taking over as bassist. The band released three records and received awards for Best Toronto Club Band and Best Independent Music Video before disbanding in 1995.

== History ==
=== Early years and The Demo (1989–1993) ===
Slash Puppet was formed in 1989 in Toronto, Ontario, by drummer Franklin Wyles and vocalist Mif. The pair recruited guitarists Frank Bartoletti, Lou Garscadden and bassist Pete Dove through mutual musical contacts in the local scene. After rigorous rehearsal the band began recording what would become their first (cassette only) release titled The Demo in Toronto. While performing extensively in Toronto and Southern Ontario the band was nominated for "Best Toronto Club Act" at the 1990 Toronto Music Awards alongside David Wilcox, Sven Gali, The Phantoms, Bourbon Tabernacle Choir, and The Razorbacks eventually taking home the award by the widest margin of votes through all categories of the evening. It was at this time that the band caught the attention of Canadian music manager Ray Danniels (Rush) who quickly signed them to a management deal with SRO Management/Anthem Entertainment and the band immediately embarked on a media blitz with television and radio interviews across Canada while showcasing for A & R representatives from record labels across North America.

=== Slash Puppet (1993–1995) ===
Following the success of the underground release of The Demo the band began work on a more official debut with their self-titled record Slash Puppet. Initially after recording the band was unhappy with the final result claiming the production was "way too Bryan Adams" and lacking in power. Eventually the record landed in the hands of Canadian Juno nominated producer Richard Chycki (Dreamtheater, Rush, Aerosmith) who remixed the album with a more organic approach with which the band credits to saving the record. After having been released from SRO Management/Anthem Entertainment earlier in the year the band released Slash Puppet in 1993 on Fringe Records and with regular rotation on Much Music's Power Hour and radio stations throughout Canada continued independently with performances in Toronto, Southern Ontario and Quebec. In late 1994, with the rising popularity of grunge music the group found itself slowed to a stall, crediting a decreased interest in hard rock and glam groups as the culprit. Eventually Slash Puppet with the additions of new bassist Dave Carreiro (who replaced original bassist Pete Dove after he had left for New York) and guitarist Marcel La Fleur (who had replaced original guitarist Lou Garscadden) embarked on what would be their final tour across Canada. In early 1995, the band returned home to finish out their final 5 shows in Toronto and southern Ontario, when lead vocalist Mif announced that he was leaving the band to pursue other interests including an acting career, due primarily to the grunge invasion and the subsequent decline of hard rock and heavy metal. The remaining group members found themselves drifting into different musical directions which would effectively end the band's successful six-year career. Two singles ("When The Whip Comes Down" and "Rippin' On A Wishbone") were featured in the 1996 Cannon Pictures film Chain of Command.

In this era they also sometimes performed as a backing band for singer-songwriter Andrew Matheson.

=== Death of Lou Garscadden (2001) ===
On August 4, 2001, after returning home from an evening out, founding guitarist Lou Garscadden was found deceased in his bed the next morning by his grandmother whose home he had been sharing. Speculation was that Lou had died from a heart attack. His funeral was well attended with Lou's coffin being carried out from the chapel to the Slash Puppet song "Hitch A Ride (On A Train)".

=== No Strings Attached (2007) ===
In early 2007, twelve years after disbanding rumours began circulating that a new Slash Puppet record was being released through Australian label Suncity Records. During the band's hiatus Canadian television via Much Music's Power Hour segment had begun airing reruns of Slash Puppet's video for "Slow Down" which revitalized interest in the group and caught the attention of the Suncity's Australian executives. Tentatively titled Slash Puppet II the name was changed to No Strings Attached so as to not imply a comeback for the group. On September 3, 2007, No Strings Attached was released featuring re-released material recorded during the band's 1992 demo era. No Strings Attached received accolades on several hard rock and heavy metal fanzines worldwide, making it to #7 on Sleaze Roxx's "Top 10 Best" releases of 2007.

=== Studs & Gems (2021) ===
On October 19, 2019 (30 years to the day of Slash Puppet's inaugural show at Rock 'N' Roll Heaven in Toronto), vocalist Mif announces that the release of a compilation CD featuring "the band's very best songs" was in the works in commemoration of the anniversary of the band's debut. "After many months of unfortunate setbacks and delays," it was announced on October 19, 2021, in an official press release, "the band's long awaited compilation CD entitled Studs & Gems is finally here" and along with this announcement the official CD cover artwork was also released. On October 26, 2021, the song list for the CD was then released and on November 10, 2021, Mif while being interviewed on a CGCM Radio/Podcast announces the official release of the limited edition compilation through in house (independent) label MIF Entertainment.

=== Here For Blood (2022–2023) ===
On October 18, 2022, in an official press release from the desk of Mif (through MIF Entertainment Canada) it was announced that the Slash Puppet song "When The Whip Comes Down" would be featured in the Canadian slasher comedic horror film Here For Blood. The film was Selected as the "Closing Gala Presentation for 2022" at the Toronto After Dark Film Festival and made its World Premier cinematic debut on Sunday October 23, 2022, at the Scotiabank Theatre in Toronto, Ontario to rave reviews! On September 29, 2023, in an exclusive report JoBlo.com announced that Cineverse had acquired the US distribution rights for the film and that they plan to give Here For Blood a theatrical release sometime in 2024 and that subsequently it will be released worldwide via their horror digital streaming platform Screambox.

== Musical style ==
Slash Puppet is primarily classified as hard rock, while including elements of glam rock, blues and heavy metal.

== Reunion rumours ==
In 2017, the group was spotted together in Toronto prompting speculation that a reunion could be in the works. The rumour was further substantiated by vocalist Mif's teasing of the event on several Facebook fan groups for the band.

In October 2019, Mif announced on Slash Puppet's Facebook page, in connection with the 30th anniversary of the band's inaugural show (Thursday October 19, 1989) that a new Slash Puppet compilation titled Studs and Gems is about to be released. The compilation became available for pre-orders and the track listing was revealed in October 2021. All six songs from the 1993 self-titled CD are included as well as five songs from No Strings Attached, and a previously unreleased live song.

== Awards ==
Award	Year	Nominated work	Category	Result
Toronto Music Awards	1990	Slash Puppet	Best Toronto Club Band	Won
Los Angeles Music Awards	1993	When the Whip Comes Down (from "Slash Puppet" CD)	Best Independent Music Video	Won
Sleaze Roxx Magazine	2007	No Strings Attached	Top CD of 2007	Won

== Discography ==
Slash Puppet has released one EP and three albums.

=== Releases ===
Year	Album	Label	Chart Peak	
1990	The Demo - EP	(Anthem Records/Universal Music)	—	—
1993	Slash Puppet	Fringe Records	—	—
2007	No Strings Attached	Suncity Records	—	—
2021	Studs & Gems	MIF Entertainment	—	—
"—" denotes a release that did not chart. "×" denotes periods where charts did not exist or were not archived.

=== Singles ===
Year	Title	Chart Peak
1991	"Slow Down"	—
1994	"When The Whip Comes Down"	—
"—" denotes a release that did not chart. "×" denotes periods where charts did not exist or were not archived.

== Videos ==
Slow Down (1990)

When The Whip Comes Down (1993)
