= Magi-Nation (TV series) =

- Genre: Fantasy; Adventure; Educational
- Created by: Shelley Hoffman; Robert Pincombe
- Based on: Magi-Nation Duel by Interactive Imagination
- Developed by: Michael Sloan
- Starring: Lyon Smith; Martha MacIsaac; Dan Petronijevic; Rick Miller; Joseph Motiki; Alan Park; Martin Roach; Rory O’Shea; Alex Karzis
- Countries of origin: Canada; South Korea
- No. of seasons: 2
- No. of episodes: 52

Production
- Executive producers: Michael Hirsh; Wook Jung; Pamela Slavin; Hyun Dong Ahn; Toper Taylor
- Producers: Min-Sung-Cho; Bul-Kyung Kim; Wolf Kim; Chun-Woo Lee; Marlene Schmidt; Ha-Mook Sung
- Running time: 22 minutes
- Production companies: Daewon Media; Cookie Jar Entertainment

Original release
- Network: CBC (Canada); SBS TV (South Korea); Kids' WB (United States; season 1); RaiSat Smash (Italy; season 1)
- Release: September 22, 2007 – November 15, 2010

Magi-Nation is a Canadian-South Korean animated series created by Shelley Hoffman and Robert Pincombe based on the card game and video game Magi-Nation Duel. The series was co-produced by Cookie Jar Entertainment, in association with The Canadian Broadcasting Corporation. The series premiered in Canada on September 8, 2007, on CBC and on September 22, 2007 in the U.S. on Kids' WB. A series of DVDs was set to be released from October 21, 2008 through January 6, 2009 from NCircle Entertainment. The series had formerly aired in the U.S. on Toonzai on The CW and formerly on Cookie Jar Toons on This TV, with the second season's worldwide premiere airing on Cookie Jar Toons. The series was cancelled due to low ratings. Episodes of the second season were released online in 2010.

== Synopsis ==
Three thousand years ago in the Moonlands, the Shadow Magi Agram was sealed inside the planet's Core by the Core Glyph and the Dreamstones which provided its power. Now he plans to escape by using his Shadow Geysers to weaken his prison in order to bring the Moonlands under his control, and only a Magi known as the "Final Dreamer" can stop him. A young boy from Earth, Tony Jones, is summoned into the Moonlands as he is believed to be this Final Dreamer. He joins forces with the apprentice Magi, Edyn, and the Shadow Stalker, Strag, on a mission to gather the Dreamstones before Agram is set free. Using the Book of Elders, the three travel through the Moonlands while combatting the forces of Agram and gaining an ever-growing collection of Dream Creatures from the Moonlands that they visit.

== Voice cast ==
- Lyon Smith - Tony Jones
- Martha MacIsaac - Edyn, Bisiwog
- Dan Petronijevic - Strag
- Rick Miller - Freep, Orwin, Ashio
- Joseph Motiki - Ugger
- Alan Park - Furok
- Martin Roach - Agram
- Alex Karzis - Korg, Naroom Hyren
- Rory O'Shea - Zed, Djarmander

=== Minor cast ===
- Jason Barr
- Emily Hurson
- Alan Park
- Julie Lemieux
- Bill Colgate
- Jamie Watson
- Rory O'Shea
- Jason Deline
- Dan Petronijevic
- Scott McCord
- Rick Miller
- Linda Ballantyne
- Helen King
- Joris Jarsky
- Dwayne Hill
- Barbara Budd

== Cast and characters ==
=== Main ===
- Lyon Smith as Anthony "Tony" Jones, a 14-year-old boy from Earth who was summoned to the Moonlands with a ring given to him by his grandfather, Spencer Jones. He has dark brown hair, a fur vest and heavy-duty boots as well as developing a muscular chest and arms from his time in the Moonlands. Although initially unwilling to take on his role as a hero, Tony comes to accept the realm as his new home and his friends as a family. After months of training, he becomes a skilled warrior who adjusts to his new world's culture and lifestyle. He also has a crush on Trup'tika, a girl of his age from the ocean realm of Orothe. His main Dream Creature is Furok (voiced by Alan Park), a mysterious bearlike creature who is his best friend and protector.
- Martha MacIsaac as Edyn, a 14-year-old girl from the forests of Naroom who lives with her guardian, Orwin. She's Tony's other best friend, always there to have his back, is well-read in the books of the Moonlands, caring, organized, brave, and is an expert magic spell caster. She has very long and enormous red hair tied up in a ponytail, an athletic, slender figure topped off with a leaf skirt and red tank top. Her main Dream Creature is Ugger (voiced by Joseph Motiki), a plant-based creature with a rhinoceros-like horn.
- Dan Petronijevic as Strag, a 14-year-old from the Underneath who has trained as a Shadow Stalker to rid the Moonlands of the Shadow Magi. He is one of the Final Dreamers alongside Tony and Edyn, and is able to use his Moon senses to aid them in their adventures. Despite this training, he is of the lineage of the first Shadow Magi, Agram, and lives with this shadow. Strag primarily uses relics and his turtlelike Dream Creature, Freep (voiced by Rick Miller).
- Martin Roach as Agram, the powerful leader of the Shadow Magi who was sealed in the Core of the Moonlands 3,000 years ago. He uses his Shadow Geysers to weaken his prison in an attempt to return to the surface Moonlands. During the first season, he escaped from the Core but was re-imprisoned with the Book of Elders. In the second season, he returned using the body of Gorath, one of his Dream Creatures.
- Alex Karzis and Rory O'Shea as Korg and Zed, Agram's primary henchmen. They're a duo of evil, yet bumbling Shadow Magi who use an arsenal of evil Dream Creatures supplied by Agram. They later are joined by other Shadow Magi including Chur, Ashio, and Warrada.

=== Recurring ===
- Rick Miller as:
  - Orwin, the Elder of Vash Naroom and Edyn's guardian. He is a powerful Magi and a mentor to Tony, Edyn, and Strag. Though Orwin was later turned into a Shadow Magi by Korg and Zed in "Fiery Betrayal," he was soon returned to normal in "The Secret Chamber."
  - Ashio, a Shadow Magi who was sent to destroy the Moonland of Paradwyn.
- Julie Lemieux as Evu, a wise old woman from Vash Naroom. She helped to summon Tony to the Moonlands and often assisted Tony, Edyn, and Strag on their adventures. She is a wise sage and displays great power despite her age and her size.
- Helen King as Trup'tika, a teenage mermaid girl from the realm of Orothe. She has long red-pink hair tied in two buns, pointed ears, gills, and can transform her legs into a tail to enable her to swim with unmatched grace and agility. Trup'tika has a noticeable crush on Tony, which Strag and Edyn often tease him about. She admires Tony for his selflessness and bravery in his quest to save the Moonlands from destruction.

=== Dream Creatures ===
Dream Creatures are creatures that inhabit the Moonlands and originate from the Dream Plane. A Magi who gains the trust of a Dream Creature or defeats it in battle gains an Animite crystal. This Animite can be used to summon that Dream Creature back from the Dream Plane when needed by using some of a Magi's energy. A Dream Creature that is defeated simply returns to the Dream Plane and can be summoned again if the Magi has sufficient energy. Within the Dream Plane, even corrupted Core Creatures are temporarily purified to their natural states.

=== Guardian Hyrens ===
The Guardian Hyrens are unique Dream Creatures and a subset of the often draconic Hyrens. Each Guardian Hyren protects a particular Moonland and, namely, its respective Dreamstone. A test is given to those seeking a Guardian Hyren's Dreamstone in order to test that Magi's worthiness and character.

== Episodes ==
=== Season 1 (2007–08) ===
No. overall	No. in season	Title	Directed by	Written by	Original release date
1	1	"Final Dreamer"	Paul Hunt, You-Won Paeng	Kevin Lund, Michael Sloan	September 22, 2007
Agram threatens to escape from his prison in the Core after being imprisoned for 3,000 years and begins his plot to take over the Moonlands. In order to combat Agram, Tony Jones is summoned from Earth to the Moonlands, believed to be the prophesied Final Dreamer.
2	2	"Return to Vash Naroom"	Paul Hunt, You-Won Paeng	Kevin Lund, Michael Sloan	September 29, 2007
Convinced that his friends are his enemies by Agram's spell, Tony flees from Edyn and Strag. When brought back to his senses, Tony must help protect Naroom using the Book of Elders for guidance.
3	3	"Kybar's Teeth"	Paul Hunt, You-Won Paeng	Kevin Lund	October 6, 2007
The trio are sent to the mountainous region of Kybar's Teeth in order to claim the region's Dreamstone. During the trial, Tony decides to risk his own safety in saving the life of a Shadow Magi, Chur, and earns the Dreamstone.
4	4	"Fire and Ice"	Paul Hunt, You-Won Paeng	Kevin Lund	October 13, 2007
Korg and Zed are breaking up chunks of the glaciers of Nar to wreak havoc on the climates of the other Moonlands. The trio must brave the cold to protect the Moonlands and to thaw Orwin.
5	5	"Blight"	Paul Hunt, You-Won Paeng	Kevin Lund	October 20, 2007
Iyori brings word from Paradwyn that Ashio is poisoning the Moonland's soil and that her father and leader of Paradwyn, Bazha, has been captured. With the help of Saranther, the trio are able to rescue Bazha and restore Paradwyn.
6	6	"Enemy in the Sands"	Paul Hunt, You-Won Paeng	Dave Dias	October 27, 2007
After being stranded in the harsh desert of d'Resh, the region's Guardian Hyren in the form of a Sandstone Gila tests whether Tony would sacrifice himself for his friends or act in self-preservation.
7	7	"First Geyser"	Paul Hunt, You-Won Paeng	Edward Kay, Kevin Lund	November 3, 2007
After a Shadow Geyser erupts in Naroom, Edyn is taken prisoner to the Core. A disguised Agram then attempts to gain the knowledge of the Book of Elders from her, but she had prepared herself so that she could only relay spells that would harm Shadow Magi.
8	8	"Arena Night"	Paul Hunt, You-Won Paeng	Shawn Kaib	November 10, 2007
Strag returns to the Underneath and reunites with his childhood friend, Inara, who is the current Arena Champion. The two battle in the arena for the region's Dreamstone, but Strag finds that she has been cheating. Her cover blown, she reveals herself to be a Shadow Magi and that the battle was a ruse to gain the real location of the Dreamstone.
9	9	"The Shadow You Know"	Paul Hunt, You-Won Paeng	Ben Joseph	November 17, 2007
Inara is pursued deep into Chiroptera's Lair by the trio. Upon finding the Guardian Hyren, the two battle for the Dreamstone. In a last ditch effort, Strag uses his Allegiance Relic to try and save his former friend. When Inara fights off the Core's influence, she is rewarded the Dreamstone, which she gives to Strag.
10	10	"Cloud Cover"	Paul Hunt, You-Won Paeng	Daniel Bryan Franklin	November 24, 2007
The cloud-based region of Arderial is in trouble for the first time after the construction of the Cloud Keeper. The trio discover that the threat is due to Magistrate Nimbulo's working with Korg and Zed. With help from Shimmer and the Guardian Hyren, the plot is foiled, but Arderial's Dreamstone is placed out of reach.
11	11	"The Depths of Courage"	Paul Hunt, You-Won Paeng	Edward Kay	December 1, 2007
A spell being cast on the Book of Elders sends the trio to Orothe, where Tony learns that his grandfather, Spencer Jones, was once a hero of the Moonlands. Tony must live up to this legacy when faced with the monstrous Cawh.
12	12	"Fiery Betrayal"	Paul Hunt, You-Won Paeng	Kim Thompson	December 8, 2007
Tony begins to have visions of a coming threat. Meanwhile, another Shadow Geyser appears in the volcanic region of Cald. Though Tony acquires the region's Dreamstone, Orwin is corrupted into a Shadow Magi and joins Agram's forces through the geyser.
13	13	"The Eyes of Agram"	Paul Hunt, You-Won Paeng	Erika Strobel	December 15, 2007
The trio venture into the Core in an attempt to rescue their friend, Orwin.
14	14	"The Precious Haz-Mai"	Paul Hunt, You-Won Paeng	Ben Joseph	January 5, 2008
The trio find the Dreamstone of the Weave protected as a sacred object, the Haz-Mai, and Tony is placed in prison for touching it. When a Shadow Geyser appears, they must work together with the Weavians to defend the region.
15	15	"The Forum of the Elders"	Paul Hunt, You-Won Paeng	Kim Thompson	January 12, 2008
When the Book of Elders is transported to Kybar's Teeth, the trio must prove themselves worthy of the book to its guardians, Snout and Peepers.
16	16	"Magi Undercover"	Paul Hunt, You-Won Paeng	Daniel Bryan Franklin	January 26, 2008
Using a spell, the trio go undercover in a Shadow Magi camp in the swamps of Bograth. The trio recover the Dreamstone, but Strag nearly loses himself in his disguise.
17	17	"Frozen Fortress"	Paul Hunt, You-Won Paeng	Ben Joseph	February 2, 2008
The Guardian Hyren of Nar has been imprisoned by Sikan, and the region's Dreamstone lies within one of her relics. The Final Dreamers must face her relics while trying to find the Dreamstone.
18	18	"The Secret Chamber"	Paul Hunt, You-Won Paeng	Shawn Kaib	February 9, 2008
The leaders of the Moonlands hold a secret meeting to determine whether the trio really are the Final Dreamers. The vote is delayed by a spell from Evu as Orwin and the Shadow Magi appear. When Orwin is returned to normal, the council accept the trio as the Final Dreamers.
19	19	"Beware the Realm Raiders"	Paul Hunt, You-Won Paeng	Kim Thompson	February 16, 2008
Both the Dreamstone of Orothe and the Book of Elders are stolen by the Realm Raiders. When the trio wind up as hostages, they are rescued by a friend from Orothe.
20	20	"Earth to Tony"	Paul Hunt, You-Won Paeng	Daniel Bryan Franklin	February 23, 2008
A Vortex Relic allows Tony to return to Earth to speak with his grandfather about the Moonlands, but Tony's time is limited. Returning just in time, the Guardian Hyren of Naroom gives him the region's Dreamstone for returning instead of remaining on Earth.
21	21	"The Preserver"	Paul Hunt, You-Won Paeng	Ben Joseph	March 8, 2008
Gazean has been capturing Magi and Dream Creatures to transport specimens from the Moonlands away from Agram's reach. When they are captured, the Final Dreamers must convince the misguided Weavian to change his tactics.
22	22	"Brave New Realm"	Paul Hunt, You-Won Paeng	Shawn Kalb	March 15, 2008
Upon contact with a Shadow Geyser, the Arderial Dreamstone forms an island claimed by Korg and Zed as Korgzedia. The Final Dreamers must ally with the other Shadow Magi to retrieve the Dreamstone and to defeat Korg and Zet, but one Shadow Magi seeks to betray them all.
23	23	"Voyage to the Dream Plane"	Paul Hunt, You-Won Paeng	Dave Dias	March 22, 2008
Agram has found a way to leech void energy into the Dream Plane by using a small Salamark. The Final Dreamers must do the impossible and enter the Dream Plane themselves before the energy corrupts the entire Dream Plane.
24	24	"The Ultimate Dream Creature"	Paul Hunt, You-Won Paeng	Shawn Kalb	March 29, 2008
The eleventh Dreamstone is in Paradwyn and involves the powerful Mythicore. The Final Dreamers must combat Agram's forces while convincing the Mythicore of their intentions. Upon gaining the Mythicore's trust, they find that its Animite is the Dreamstone of Paradwyn and that a twelfth Dreamstone exists.
25	25	"Fate of the Moonlands"	Paul Hunt, You-Won Paeng	Dave Dias	April 5, 2008
Being tricked into entering the Core for the twelfth and final Dreamstone, the Final Dreamers enter the Core as Agram is freed to carry out his plans.
26	26	"Day of Destiny"	Paul Hunt, You-Won Paeng	Dave Dias	April 12, 2008
Tony must return to Earth to find the Core Dreamstone as the rest of the Moonlands' Magi hold off Agram and the powerful Shadow Cawh. When Tony returns, the Final Dreamers combine their powers to create Rokreeper to defeat Agram and seal him back in the Core.

=== Season 2 (2010) ===
No. overall	No. in season	Title	Directed by	Written by	Original release date
27	1	"The Final Hyren"	Taeho Han	Dave Dias	October 27, 2010
The Final Dreamers are called on. This time they must begin a new quest to save the Moonlands, and that quest's name is the Hyren Quest.
28	2	"Flames of Glory"	Taeho Han	Kevin Lund	October 28, 2010
A new weapon threatens to destroy the Dream World and the Final Dreamers are the only ones that can stop it. Their fame and popularity is known all over the world, but how will the Final Dreamers react when they realize that fame can't help them in battle?
29	3	"To See Through Sand"	Taeho Han	Lienne Sawatsky, Dan Williams	October 29, 2010
The Final Dreamers are forced to confront the Dresh H'yren as the Hyren Quest continues. The only problem is the H'yren has powerful illusions that could keep the Final Dreamers from fulfilling their mission.
30	4	"Eye of the Storm"	Taeho Han	Doug Hadders, Adam Rotstein	October 31, 2010
As their quest continues, the Final Dreamers awaken and find themselves stranded on a mysterious island. Can they find a way off of this island to continue their quest?
31	5	"Inside the Dark Heart"	Taeho Han	Erika Strobel	November 1, 2010
Edyn returns to Nar where she consults with some old spell-casters that had previously served as mentors.
32	6	"Hunt for the Hunter"	Taeho Han	Grant Sauve	November 2, 2010
A bounty hunter is forced to seek the aid of the Final Dreamers to travel to Naroom when the Shadow Magi reveal they also have an interest in him.
33	7	"Peak Performance"	Taeho Han	Kim Thompson	November 3, 2010
The quest takes the Final Dreamers to an odd location known as Kybar's Teeth. When they arrive they encounter the Elders who reveal they still have a thing or two to teach the young heroes.
34	8	"The Abysmal Truth"	Taeho Han	Kevin Lund	November 4, 2010
The Shadow Magi recruit a new warrior. After encountering the warrior, Tony begins to wonder why his grandfather was always so odd.
35	9	"Night Crawlers"	Taeho Han	Doug Hadders, Adam Rotstein	November 5, 2010
The Final Dreamers travel to the land of Bograth as part of their quest. Once night falls upon the land, the Final Dreamers learn the land is holding a terrible secret.
36	10	"Gorath's Shadow"	Taeho Han	Erika Strobel	November 7, 2010
The Final Dreamers learn of something they never thought possible- there is a way to purify Shadow Creatures into Dream Creatures. After having a few successes the Final Dreamers decide to try the spell upon the most powerful Shadow Creature - Gorath.
37	11	"Welcome Home Strag, Part 1"	Taeho Han	Shawn Kalb	November 8, 2010
Strag learns that his beloved homeland is being ruled by a Shadow Magi Emperor. Seeing no other choice Strag decides to leave his friends to try and free his homeland, but will the Final Dreamers let their friend leave, or will they travel with him to free the realm?
38	12	"Welcome Home Strag, Part 2"	Taeho Han	Lienne Sawatsky, Dan Williams	November 9, 2010
Tony is forced to battle for control of Chur's gladiator arena, but it is merely a distraction for Edyn and Strag. The other two Final Dreamers are using the time to search for the elusive Underneath Hyren.
39	13	"Bad to the Core"	Taeho Han	Shawn Kalb	November 10, 2010
After failing to purify Gorgram, the Final Dreamers are forced to follow him into the Core. Once inside the core, the Final Dreamers must recover the Moonlands Diamond and Orwin's staff, the two pieces needed to summon The Final Hyren.
40	14	"Tangle in the Jungle"	Taeho Han	Grant Sauve	November 11, 2010
The Final Dreamers have successfully summoned the Hyrens, but no sooner do they do so than they are challenged. Seeing no other choice, the Final Dreamers are forced to battle for control of the guardian Hyrens in the jungles of Paradwyn. When things begin to look bad for the Dreamers, they are shocked to receive assistance from an unlikely ally.
41	15	"Showdown in Vash Naroom"	Taeho Han	Kim Thompson	November 15, 2010
The Final Dreamers learn the ancient library of Vash Naroom is about to be invaded. The team must unite again to attempt protecting Vash Naroom from the Shadow Magi.
42	16	"Medieval Magi"	Taeho Han	Kevin Lund	November 15, 2010
The Final Dreamers travel through Naroom and run into a city that is based on the Earth's medieval era.
43	17	"Tomb of the Relic Forger"	Taeho Han	Lienne Sawatsky, Dan Williams	November 15, 2010
The Final Dreamers search for the most powerful of the ancient relics, but they aren't the only ones doing so. Gorgram is also on the hunt, and it could lead to a great clash or a great swing in the battle between the Final Dreamers and the Shadow Magi.
44	18	"Hyren of a Thousand Faces"	Taeho Han	Erika Strobel	November 15, 2010
A new Hyren that nobody knew of is revealed. The new Hyren is the Guardian of the Dream Plane, but whoever wins him could cause more trouble for the opposition than ever before as it could give them the ability to invade dreams.
45	19	"Curse of the Realm Raiders"	Taeho Han	Aaron Barnett	November 15, 2010
A group of pirates attacks the Final Dreamers and steals the Moonlands Diamond. No sooner do the Final Dreamers lose the Moonlands Diamond than a mysterious curse prophecy begins to be fulfilled. Can the Dreamers find a way to overcome a curse, defeat a group of pirates, and get the Moonlands Diamond back, or has defeat finally caught up to them?
46	20	"Grudge Match"	Taeho Han	Grant Sauve	November 15, 2010
The Final Dreamers come across not one, but two Guardian Hyrens and try to enlist their services. The only problem is the two Hyrens have an ancient feud that could separate the team or lead them into more trouble than they've ever imagined.
47	21	"Fear the Gear"	Taeho Han	Edward Kay	November 15, 2010
An ancient, powerful weapon is unleashed on the Moonlands. Now the Final Dreamers and Gorgram must set aside their differences and work together to try and reverse this weapon's course.
48	22	"Lights, Camera, Magi"	Taeho Han	Ben Joseph	November 15, 2010
The Final Dreamers travel to Earth to retrieve the Moonlands Diamond only to learn that one of Tony's so-called friends possesses it. Can they find a way to get the Diamond back and turn him into a true friend?
49	23	"Realms Honor"	Taeho Han	Kim Thompson	November 15, 2010
The Final Dreamers have almost completed their quest, but they must find a way to summon the Final Hyren for it to be truly over, and they can't seem to do so.
50	24	"Sons of the Underneath"	Taeho Han	Erika Strobel	November 15, 2010
The Final Dreamers return to the Underneath with the goal of battling Emperor Chur, bringing down his evil reign and freeing Strag's father. With so many possibilities that could go wrong, the team can only hope that everything works to their advantage.
51	25	"Allegiance Lost"	Taeho Han	Shawn Kalb	November 15, 2010
The Final Dreamers must join forces with an unlikely ally to save Tony's grandfather from the Shadow Magi, but will trust again be an issue?
52	26	"Dreamer's Last Stand"	Taeho Han	Dave Dias	November 15, 2010
The Final Hyren Quest reaches its epic conclusion with the Final Dreamers and Gorgram involved in one final battle, but only one side can prevail. Who will summon the Final Hyren and rule the Moonlands?

== Reception ==
The series has a rating of 3/5 stars on Common Sense Media.

== Merchandising ==
Cookie Jar Entertainment acquired merchandising rights along with the TV show license. An online computer game, Magi-Nation: Battle for the Moonlands, has been released. It was distributed by Acclaim Games. A new card game and a Nintendo DS video game adaptation were announced but ultimately did not see a release.

== Telecast and home media ==
The series was first premiered in Canada on September 8, 2007, on CBC and on September 22, 2007 in the U.S. on Kids' WB. The series had formerly aired in the U.S. on Toonzai on The CW and formerly on Cookie Jar Toons on This TV, with the second season's worldwide premiere airing on Cookie Jar Toons. The show was cancelled due to low ratings.

=== DVD releases ===
A series of DVDs was set to be released from October 21, 2008 through January 6, 2009 from NCircle Entertainment.

- Magi-Nation: The Moonlands, released on June 16, 2009, includes these episodes: "The Final Dreamer, Fire and Ice, Blight, Enemy in the Sands".
- Magi-Nation: Fight the Shadows, released on June 16, 2009, includes these episodes: "First Geyser, Cloud Cover, Fiery Betrayal, Eyes of Agram".

In the United Kingdom, Platform Entertainment Ltd released episodes on DVD.

In Germany, season 1 was released on five DVDs; all contained both German and English-language audio tracks.

=== Online streaming ===
The series' twelve remaining episodes have been released online. Currently, the entire series is now streaming on Tubi.
