= Joe Bodolai =

American producer (1948-2011)

- Born: May 11, 1948; Youngstown, Ohio, U.S.
- Died: December 26, 2011 (aged 63); Los Angeles, California, U.S.
- Occupations: Film and television producer, writer
- Known for: Co-founder of The Comedy Network
- Children: James Bulliard

Joe Bodolai (May 11, 1948 – December 26, 2011) was an American film and television producer and writer.

Born and raised in the United States, Bodolai was opposed to the Vietnam War and moved to Canada in order to avoid being drafted. He moved back to the United States in 1981 to write for twenty episodes of Saturday Night Live before returning to Canada.

He is best known for producing such television shows as It's Only Rock & Roll, Comics!, and The Kids in the Hall and helping to launch the careers of the young talent featured on those shows. He also co-wrote the first draft of the film Wayne's World with Mike Myers.

Bodolai was a founder of The Comedy Network, helping the new channel secure its licence from the Canadian Radio-television and Telecommunications Commission in 1996, and expected to be named the new channel's head by its owners. He was disappointed when he was not hired and decided to return permanently to the United States.

Bodolai was found dead on December 26, 2011, in a Hollywood hotel room of an apparent suicide; he was 63. No suicide note was found, though on December 23 a long post was added to his blog, entitled "If this were your last day alive what would you do?"
