= Stu Jeffries =

Canadian radio and television personality

Stuart Robert (Stu) Jeffries (born May 10, 1960) is a Canadian radio and television broadcaster. Best known as the host of CBC Television's Good Rockin' Tonite from 1986 to 1993, he is currently the morning host on CHBM-FM (Boom 97.3) in Toronto, Ontario.

Born in Richmond, British Columbia, and raised in Winnipeg, Manitoba, Jeffries worked in radio as program director and midday announcer at CJME in Regina, Saskatchewan, when he was first hired as host of Good Rockin' Tonite. Initially he kept both jobs, flying to Vancouver weekly to tape the television show, but later gave up the Regina position and moved to Vancouver. He also later became host of the CBC's teen series Switchback. By 1989, he was also a radio host on Vancouver's CKXY concurrently with his CBC Television work, and later moved to CKLG.

Following the cancellation of Good Rockin' Tonite in 1993, Jeffries hosted the Vancouver sports magazine series The Score, the entertainment magazine Metro Café and the game show Love Handles, and was a VJ for CMT Canada.

On radio, Jeffries got his start with Yorkton's CJGX 940. He worked for CKST in Vancouver and CING-FM in Hamilton, Ontario, before joining Boom 97.3.
