= Toronto Rocks =

- Presented by: John Majhor
- Country of origin: Canada

Original release
- Network: CITY-DT
- Release: 1984

Toronto Rocks is an hour-long television program presenting music videos on CITY-TV in Toronto, Ontario, Canada in the 1980s, starting in 1984. It aired live at 4PM weekdays and was initially hosted by John Majhor. Majhor was a longtime DJ at 1050 CHUM AM in Toronto and eventually became one of Canada's first "VJs" with the development of music videos. Toronto Rocks was a local contemporary to MuchMusic and MTV (CITY-TV and MuchMusic were both owned by CHUM Ltd.), and had kids rushing home from school every day to catch their favourite videos of the early-to-mid '80's. During the show, Majhor played videos by a wide variety of the big-name artists of the day, all the way from Michael Jackson's "Beat It", Van Halen's "Jump", Yes' "Owner of a Lonely Heart", to the Eurythmics' "Sweet Dreams (Are Made of This)" and other songs released in the 1980s by artists who became commercially popular during the decade. Wednesdays on the show were set aside for "Mid Week Metal Mania", where Majhor played only heavy metal videos from the hard rock and "hair bands" of the day. He also interviewed in-studio guests and had various contests and giveaways. Over 400 episodes of Toronto Rocks were aired.

Brad Giffen (1985-1988), Lance Chilton (1988–90) and JD Roberts also filled in for John Majhor from time to time.
