= Faith Heist =

- Genre: Comedy; Heist film
- Written by: Owen Maxwell; Jimmy Ruggiero
- Directed by: J. B. Sugar
- Starring: Jonathan Langdon; Dalmar Abuzeid; Sagine Sémajuste; Steve Lund
- Theme music composer: Todor Kobakov; Iva Delic; Tika Simone
- Country of origin: Canada
- Original language: English

Production
- Producers: Ella Myers; J.B. Sugar
- Cinematography: Vinit Borrison
- Editor: Stephen Philipson
- Running time: 110 minutes
- Production company: No Equal Entertainment

Original release
- Network: Super Channel Heart & Home
- Release: April 4, 2021

Faith Heist is a Canadian television comedy heist film, directed by J.B. Sugar and released in 2021. The film stars Jonathan Langdon as Benjamin Wright, the pastor of an inner-city Black church, who enlists members of his congregation to pull off a heist to save the church after it is swindled out of all of its money by an unscrupulous financial advisor.

The film's cast also includes Dalmar Abuzeid, Sagine Sémajuste, Steve Lund, Marty Adams, Marium Carvell, Eden Cupid, Leah Doz, Okiki Kendall, Jaeden Noel, Aaron Poole and Nadine Roden. The film was shot in fall 2020 in Hamilton, Ontario.

The film premiered in April 2021 on Super Channel Heart & Home in Canada and Bounce TV in the United States.

A sequel film, Faith Heist: A Christmas Caper, was released in 2022.

== Awards ==
Award	Date of ceremony	Category	Nominees	Result	Reference
Canadian Screen Awards	April 2022	Best TV Movie	J.B. Sugar, Ella Myers, Ahmet Zappa, Erin Weiss, David Hudson, Arnie Zipursky	Nominated	
Canadian Screen Awards	April 2022	Best Photography in a Comedy Program or Series	Vinit Borrison	Nominated	
Canadian Screen Awards	April 2022	Best Direction in a TV Movie	J. B. Sugar	Nominated	
Canadian Screen Awards	April 2022	Best Original Music, Fiction	Todor Kobakov, Iva Delic, Tika Simone	Nominated	
Canadian Screen Awards	April 2022	Best Writing in a TV Movie	Owen Maxwell, Jimmy Ruggiero	Nominated	
