= Full Disclosure (2001 film) =

2001 film by John Bradshaw

- Full Disclosure DVD cover
- Directed by: John Bradshaw
- Written by: Tony Johnston
- Produced by: Paul Wynn; Tony Johnston; John Bradshaw
- Starring: Fred Ward; Christopher Plummer; Rachel Ticotin; Kim Coates; Penelope Ann Miller; Virginia Madsen; Nicholas Campbell; Dan Lauria; Roberta Maxwell
- Cinematography: Barry Stone
- Edited by: Lisa Grootenboer
- Music by: Claude Desjardins; Eric N. Robertson
- Distributed by: First Look Pictures; Buena Vista
- Release date: 2001
- Running time: 97 minutes
- Country: Canada
- Language: English

Full Disclosure is a 2001 thriller film starring Fred Ward, Christopher Plummer, Rachel Ticotin and Penelope Ann Miller. It was directed by John Bradshaw.

== Background ==
The film was shot in 1999. The release was delayed due to distributing problems.

Full Disclosure was nominated for 7 Video Premiere Awards in 2001: Best Actor (Ward), Best Supporting Actor (Plummer), Best Supporting Actress (Miller), Best Original Score, Best Live-Action Premiere, Best Screenplay and Best Director.

The film was released in United States, Canada, UK, Netherlands, Finland, China, France, Spain, Italy, Norway and in Greece (in 2008).

The Canadian working title was "All The Fine Lines".

== Cast ==
- Fred Ward as John McWhirter
  - Andrew Kraulis as Young John McWhirter
- Christopher Plummer as Robert Lecker
- Rachel Ticotin as Armiti Khalq
- Penelope Ann Miller as Michelle
- Virginia Madsen as Brenda Hopkins
- Kim Coates as Dave Lewis
- Roberta Maxwell as Sarah Archer
  - Audrey Lupke as Young Sarah Archer
- Nicholas Campbell as Simon Brauman
  - Coalhouse Campbell as Young Simon Brauman
- Dan Lauria as Clive Carter
- Patrick Gallagher as Larry Quinn
- Elisa Moolecherry as Jean
- Kevin Jubinville as Carl Smythe
- Yana McIntosh as Penny Mills
- Tyrone Benskin as FBI Special Agent Draper
- James Downing as FBI Agent
- Yan Feldman as Ankash Barezai
- Will Corno as Syed Rakha
- A. Frank Ruffo as Frank Sommer
- Bill Lake as Del
- Roy Lewis as Reggie
- Danielle Wilson as Anne
- James Bulliard as Randy
- Hrant Alianak as Hosni
- Damon D'Oliveira as Marek
- James Purcell as Detective
- Chris Makepeace as Pilot
