= Eye Eye =

Canadian rock band

- Origin: Toronto, Ontario, Canada
- Genres: Rock, new wave
- Years active: 1983–1989
- Label: Duke Street Records
- Past members: Bill Wood; Andy Ryan; Doug Ruston; Mark Caporal; Michael Bell; Tom Lewis; Donald Quan

Eye Eye was a Canadian rock band in the 1980s.

== Background ==
The band had its roots in The Oh Nos, a Toronto band whose members included vocalist Bill Wood and guitarist Andy Ryan. After that band broke up, Wood formed the band Billy Club, while Ryan joined with drummer Mark Caporal to form Eye Eye as a duo, to which vocalist Michael Bell and bassist Doug Ruston were soon added. Both bands were finalists in Q107's Homegrown talent competition in 1984, which Eye Eye won; the following year, Eye Eye were also finalists in CBC Television's Rock Wars and the Rock Express/MuchMusic Talent Search.

With this success, the band entered the studio to record a demo which attracted interest from several record labels, but their early contract offers were withdrawn when Bell left the band. Wood then joined the band as Bell's replacement, and the band signed to Duke Street Records in late 1985.

Their song "Essence of You" featured in the 1988 horror film Friday the 13th Part VII: The New Blood.

== Recording ==
They released the album Just in Time to Be Late in 1986 on Duke Street, and released the singles "Out on a Limb" and "X-Ray Eyes". "Out on a Limb" peaked at #51 in the RPM100 Singles chart the week of August 23, 1986, and "X-Ray Eyes" peaked at #52 the week of November 22, while the album peaked at #87 on the RPM100 Albums chart in the week of July 5. They toured across Canada to support the album as an opening act for both Glass Tiger and Platinum Blonde.

The band garnered a Juno Award nomination for Most Promising Group at the Juno Awards of 1986. "Out on a Limb" also garnered a CASBY Award nomination for Best Video in 1986.

When it came time to work on a follow-up album the band had few new songs ready to record, and thus worked with producer David Bendeth for several months to write and prepare songs and to toughen their sound. During this process, Ruston left the band and was replaced by Tom Lewis, and Donald Quan also joined the band on keyboards. Their second album, Common Ground, was released in 1988, and spawned the singles "Endless Night" and "My Sensation". The album was generally praised by critics as being stronger than their debut, and "Endless Night" charted on the RPM100, but the album was not commercially successful and the band subsequently broke up.

== Later years ==
Andy Ryan became a recording engineer and opened his own studio in Scarborough, and later went into real estate.

Bill Wood initially continued in music with the band Ghosttown and as a solo artist, before studying business administration and becoming a home renovation contractor; he reemerged in 2007 with the solo album Take It, and now fronts the band Bill Wood and the Woodies.

Tom Lewis joined Gordon Deppe's post-Spoons band Beyond 7, and went on to play with Honeymoon Suite, Amanda Marshall, The Partland Brothers, Tom Cochrane, Fefe Dobson, Alan Frew, Toronto and Rik Emmett.

Mark Caporal worked for Ontario Place and SOCAN until his death in 1990, after the pilot of the glider he was on suffered a cardiac arrest. Caporal, who had his private pilot's license, and was still learning to fly gliders, tried but was unable to safely land the aircraft.

Donald Quan later achieved prominence as a composer of television and film scores, most notably for the television series Relic Hunter and Mutant X.

== Discography ==
- Just in Time to Be Late (1986)
- Common Ground (1988)
