= Anthony J. Mifsud =

Maltese-born Canadian actor, singer, and songwriter

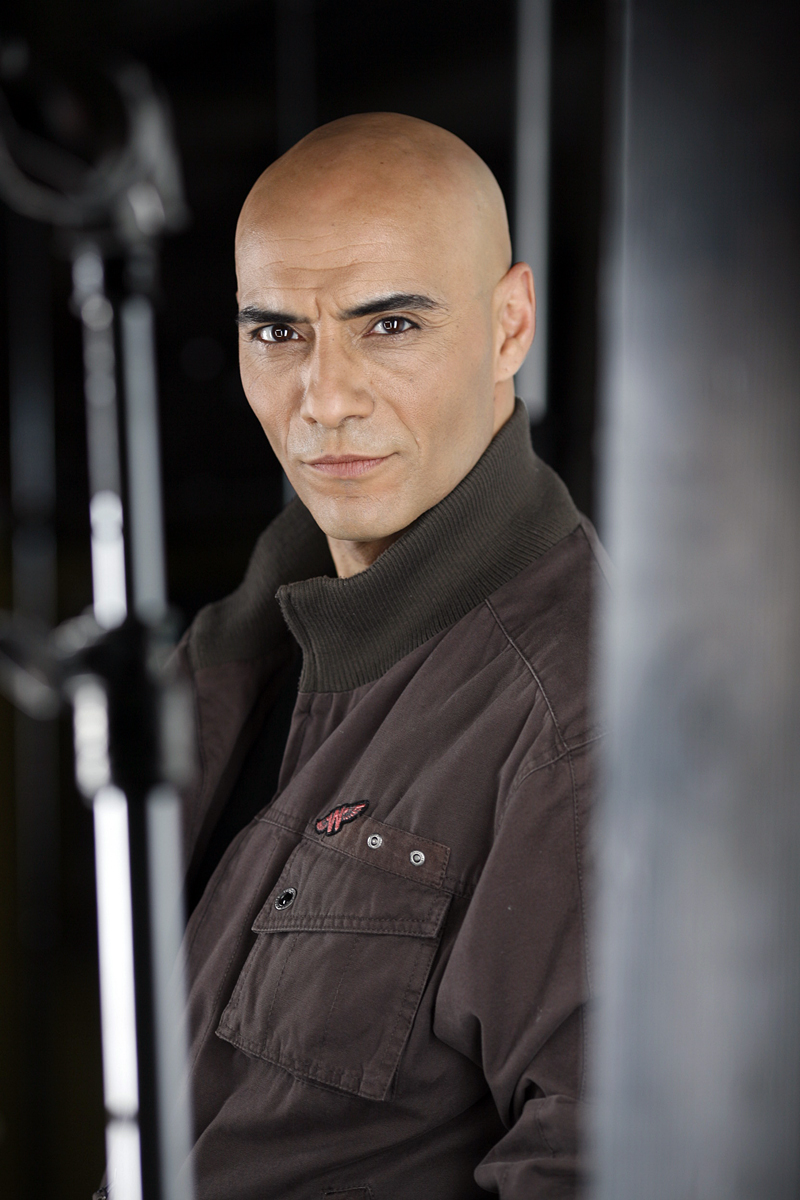
- Mifsud in 2008
- Born: Pietà, Malta
- Other name: Mif
- Citizenship: Canada; Malta
- Occupations: Actor; singer; songwriter
- Years active: 1989–present

Anthony J. Mifsud is a Maltese-born Canadian actor, singer and songwriter. He performs professionally under the moniker Mif.

== Career ==
Mif began his entertainment career in Toronto as the singer for hard rock/heavy metal musical group Slash Puppet (1989–1995). Mif released two CDs with Slash Puppet, but left the band in 1995.

On June 6, 2016, he released an EP, My Insane Friends, was released digitally for online downloading and streaming through CD Baby and its worldwide distribution affiliates including iTunes, Spotify and Pandora Radio. A departure from his musical styling with Slash Puppet, the songs are described as darker, heavier and more progressive. A video for the song "Born Inside The Shell" was also released on the same day.

Mif is also an actor who has appeared both nationally and internationally in numerous film and television productions. His film credits include such films as Welcome to Sudden Death, Kick-Ass 2, D-Tox, Detention, Just Business, Foolproof, Direct Action, Robocop: Prime Directives, Dirty Work, The Stupids, Gossip, and Partners in Action. In the martial arts action thriller Welcome to Sudden Death (Universal) Mif plays Devlin Montez the dubious and deceptive head of security of the Odessey Arena. Touted as a remake or prequel of the 1995 Jean-Claude Van Damme film Sudden Death it was released on Netflix US (digital streaming and on DVD internationally) on September 29, 2020, hitting #5 after just one day and as high as #3 as the most watched film in the "Top 10 Movies List" in the US where it stayed for almost a week, ultimately making it to #6 as the most watched program across all platforms on Netflix US. In 2025, Welcome To Sudden Death once again hit the "Top 10 Movies List" for most watched films on Netflix in the United Kingdom and Ireland where it reached as high as #5 for the week of August 18, 2025.

On television, Mif is currently being featured in the recurring character of the Greek Delivery Man in the third and final season of the Netflix Original Series Hemlock Grove. Entitled "The Final Chapter" the American horror thriller began streaming on October 23, 2015. He also featured in the recurring role of Dr. Necros in the Disney Action Adventure series Aaron Stone, that premiered February 13, 2009 when Disney launched their new TV network Disney XD, internationally. Other notable guest starring roles and episodic appearances on television include such popular shows as Titans season 3, 12 Monkeys, Incorporated, Beauty & the Beast, Warehouse 13, Queer as Folk, This Is Wonderland, Once a Thief, Due South, Psi Factor, F/X: The Series, Kung Fu: The Legend Continues and Relic Hunter. As a voice artist, his voice has been heard on several radio and television network programs and commercial spots across North America, pitching products for such sponsors as Bailey's Irish Cream, Hewlett-Packard, Acura, Sony, Molson, Labatts, Chrysler, Ford, General Motors, Canada Post and Kelloggs. Writing credits include several local sport publications, as well as such national magazines as Fresh, Canadian Musician, M.E.A.T Magazine, Inside Soccer and The Soccer News.

== Filmography ==
=== Film ===
Year	Title	Role	Notes	Refs.
1996	The Stupids	Explosive Guy	Film debut role	
1998	Dirty Work	Low Life		
1999	Have Mercy	Johnny		
2000	Rats	Vinnie		
2000	Gossip	Doorman		
2001	Judgement	Sinister Man		
2002	D-Tox	Carl Brandon		
2002	Partners in Action	Joey		
2003	Detention	Alek		
2003	Foolproof	Kenny		
2004	Direct Action	Khalid Manseur		
2008	Just Business	Tony Bloom	Direct-to-video	
2013	Kick-Ass 2	Convict 1		
2017	Lima	Lynch		
2020	Welcome to Sudden Death	Devlin Montez	Direct-to-video	
2020	The First Encounter	Elder		

=== Television ===
Year	Title	Role	Notes	Refs.
1991	Pepsi Power Hour	Himself	Episode: "#1.1"	
1991–1993	Power 30	Himself	2 episodes	
1994	The Kids in the Hall	Male Punk Rocker	Episode: "#4.11"	
1994–1996	Kung Fu: The Legend Continues	The Bardo Bartender	2 episodes	
1994–1997	Due South	Johnny Maigot Thomas (Pimp)	2 episodes	
1997	La Femme Nikita	Terrorist #1	Episode: "Escape"	
1997	Melanie Darrow	Carlo Erhardt	Television film	
1997	F/X: The Series	Abby Hermosa	Episode: "Requiem For A Cop"	
1998	Once a Thief	Zipper	Ep: "Little Sister"	
1998	Ça commence à bien faire	Julien	Television film	
1999	Happy Face Murders	Gary Martin	Television film; Uncredited	
1997–1999	PSI Factor: Chronicles of the Paranormal	Ash Sarafin	2 episodes	
2000	Relic Hunter	Thutmose	Ep: "Afterlife and Death"	
2001	RoboCop: Prime Directives	Chuck Conflagration	4 episodes	
2001	Do or Die	Border Guard	Miniseries	
2002	Monk	Club Manager	Ep: "Mr. Monk Goes to the Carnival"	
2003	Control Factor	Homeless Trance Man	Television film	
2003	Do or Die	Border Guard	Television film	
2003	Deathlands	Mutant Guard #1	Television film	
2004	Queer as Folk	Leather Shayman	Episode: "Stand Up for Ourselves"	
2005	This Is Wonderland	Restaurant Owner	Episode: "#3.1"	
2009–2010	Aaron Stone	Dr. Narcos	10 episodes	
2012	Aladdin and the Death Lamp	Hassan	Television film	
2013	Warehouse 13	Adam Griff	Ep: "Runaway"	
2015	Hemlock Grove	Greek Delivery Man	3 episodes	
2017	Incorporated	Wallace	2 episodes	
2017	12 Monkeys	Hockley	3 episodes	

=== Video games ===
Year	Title	Voice role	Notes	Refs.
2001	Heavy Metal: Geomatrix	Stab		
2007	Di-Gata Defenders	Orak	Television cartoon	
2011	Warriors: Legends of Troy	Ajax		

== Discography ==
Title	Album details	Band	Track
The Demo	Released: 1989; Label: Not On Label (Slash Puppet Self-released)	Slash Puppet	1. Slow Down; 2. Squeeze It In; 3. Hard On Love; 4. Turn It On; 5. Overload; 6. Some Kinda' Lady; 7. Evil Woman; 8. Bad Girls
The Demo 2	Released: 1989; Label: Not On Label (Slash Puppet Self-released)	Slash Puppet	1. Give And Take; 2. Wag O' The Tail; 3. Hitch A Ride (On A Train); 4. Spit 'N' Shine; 5. Money Maker; 6. Nothin' On Me
Slash Puppet	Released: 1993; Label: Fringe	Slash Puppet	1. When The Whip Comes Down; 2. Rippin' On A Wishbone; 3. Eyes Of A Child; 4. Stop Tellin' Me Lies; 5. Hitch A Ride (On A Train); 6. Slow Down
THD	Released: 1996; Label: Independent	Total Harmonic Distortion	1. New Evolution; 2. Should I Die; 3. Still Callin'; 4. Far And Beyond; 5. Suddenly; 6. In Myself; 7. Freedom; 8. Uncivilized; 9. Until the End of Time; 10. Karma; 11. Where White Doves Fly; 12. Karma (Reprise)
No Strings Attached	Released: 2007 (Re-release of 1989's The Demo remastered); Label: Sun City Records	Slash Puppet	1. Slow Down; 2. Squeeze It In; 3. Hard On Love; 4. Bad Girls; 5. Turn It On; 6. Evil Woman; 7. Some Kinda' Lady; 8. Overload
My Insane Friends	Released: 2016; Label: CD Baby	My Insane Friends	1. Born Inside The Shell; 2. Still Calling; 3. Far And Beyond; 4. Hole Of Mine; 5. Dying Seed; 6. Uncivilized
Studs & Gems	Released: 2021; Label: MIF Entertainment	Slash Puppet	1. When The Whip Comes Down; 2. Rippin' On A Wishbone; 3. Eyes Of A Child; 4. Evil Woman; 5. Hard On Love; 6. Stop Tellin' Me Lies; 7. Hitch A Ride (On A Train); 8. Slow Down; 9. Squeeze It In; 10. Overload; 11. Stanger Danger (Live)

== Awards ==
Year	Award	Description	Refs.
2007	Top 10 CD of 2007	Sleaze Roxx Magazine: Slash Puppet (Sun City Records) Album: "No Strings Attached"	
1993	Best Independent Music Video	L. A. Area Music Awards: Slash Puppet (Fringe Records) Video: "When The Whip Comes Down"	
1990	Best Toronto Club Band	Toronto Music Awards: Slash Puppet	
