= Eight Seconds =

Canadian synthpop/progressive rock band

- Origin: Ottawa, Ontario, Canada
- Genres: New wave
- Years active: 1982-1990, 2002-present
- Labels: Polydor, ATCO
- Members: Andrés del Castillo; March Cesare; Frank Levin (born François Lavigne); Scott Milks; Marc Parent; Michael Lester; Roberto Durbano

Eight Seconds was a Canadian synthpop/progressive rock band formed in 1982 in Ottawa. They are perhaps best known for their 1986 single "Kiss You (When It's Dangerous)" which peaked at #14 in 1987 and was on the charts for 28 weeks in Canada from the album Almacantar. The band's lineup included Andrés del Castillo (vocals/guitar), March Cesare (bass), Frank Levin (keyboards), Scott Milks (drums), and Marc Parent (guitar).

== Profile ==
Originally, Eight Seconds was a cover band playing local bars in Ottawa, but one of their first originals, "Where's Bula?", won the CHEZ 106 Sharechez '83 homegrown contest. The winning prize was the production of a video for the song, which received airplay on MuchMusic and MTV's Basement Tapes show. "Where's Bula?" also won the 1984 Canadian Film and Television Association's Best Music Video of the Year.

In 1985, the band competed in CBC Television's battle of the bands competition series Rock Wars. In late 1985, the five-song EP Ottava Rima was released and charted in Ottawa both on CHEZ 106 FM and CFRA AM. This EP was sent to producer Rupert Hine who was impressed with the strength of the songwriting and flew to Canada to see them perform live. The band headlined an outdoor show in Ottawa with Hine in the audience. Hine was interviewed after the show and declared his interest in working with the band. With Hine now part of the band's equation, Eight Seconds became a hot commodity and soon signed an international record deal with Polygram New York.

Eight Seconds spent the first two weeks of March 1986 in London England rehearsing songs from the previous EP along with new material. Then they joined Hine at his Farmyard Studios in Buckinghamshire to record the songs. The resulting studio album, Almacantar, was released several months later through Polydor. The lead single, "Kiss You (When It's Dangerous)", reached #14 overall in the Canadian charts, #1 in Quebec, and #72 in the United States. The band spent the end of 1986 and 1987 touring extensively throughout the U.S. and Canada in support of Almacantar, doing shows with Wang Chung, Paul Young, and David Bowie among others. They also headlined their own shows in regions where the CD charted well.

The summer of 1987 found the band back in Canada as nominees for a Juno Award in 1987 for "Most Promising Group" and six CASBY Awards (Best Single, Most Promising Group, Best Group, Best Video, Best Album Art). The rest of the year was dedicated to writing new material and further rehearsal.

In early 1988, the band recorded their second studio album, Big Houses produced by Paul Northfield and Frank Levin. The album was to be released under their new label Warner Music Group but was delayed due to management issues. This material remained on the shelf until 1990, damaging Eight Seconds' momentum. This, combined with the merger and effective dissolution of their American record label ATCO, led to the band's members parting way shortly following the album's release. The only charting single from the album, "Tell Diane", remained on the charts for five weeks and only peaked at #76 for 3 weeks.

Eight Seconds reunited in 2002 and covered The Beatles' "Hey Jude" for the 2004 Bullseye Records release It Was 40 Years Ago Today: A Tribute To The Beatles.

Del Castillo later founded r+d creative, a video production and live event company, involved in production for a number of Canadian government departments and crown corporations. Marc Parent continued in music, as a guitarist and songwriter, based in Montreal.. Parent replaced Myles Goodwyn in April Wine in 2023. Frank Levin pursued other business ventures, eventually moving to China. He died in 2017 due to a deteriorating health condition.

== Discography ==
=== Albums ===
- Ottava Rima (1985) [EP]
- Almacantar (1986) - CAN #87 (3 weeks)
- Big Houses (1990)

=== Singles ===
- "Kiss You (When It's Dangerous)" (1986) - CAN #14, U.S. #72
- "Where's Bula?" (1986)
- "Sincere (I Shall Return)" (1987)
- "Tell Diane" (1990) - CAN #76
