= Detention (2003 film) =

- Official DVD cover
- Directed by: Sidney J. Furie
- Written by: Paul Lynch; John Sheppard
- Produced by: Jack Gilardi Jr. Avi Lerner
- Starring: Dolph Lundgren; Alex Karzis; Kata Dobó; Joseph Scoren; Mif (Anthony J. Mifsud); Mpho Koaho
- Cinematography: Curtis Petersen
- Edited by: Saul Pincus
- Music by: Amin Bhatia
- Distributed by: Nu Image Films; Alliance Atlantis Communications
- Release date: July 5, 2003
- Running time: 98 min.
- Countries: United States; Canada
- Languages: English; Hungarian
- Budget: $ CAD 5 million

Detention is a 2003 American action film directed by Sidney J. Furie. It stars Alex Karzis as Chester Lamb and Dolph Lundgren as Sam Decker, a high school teacher who is about to retire and has one more detention to proctor. Sam, on the other hand, must unite the troublemakers and outcasts in detention to defeat the criminals and survive because the drug runners have chosen to attack the school.

== Plot ==
Former soldier Sam Decker is a teacher at Hamilton High School. A veteran of the former Yugoslavia and the Gulf War, he returned to his inner-city neighborhood after serving in the military to give back to his community. Frustrated by his teaching experiences, Sam submits his resignation feeling the education system doesn't work. Before he leaves, he commits to supervising a final detention duty with the school's most difficult students.

A well-organized group of murderers plans to hide $300 million worth of heroin that they've hijacked, using hidden compartments in two police cars in the school's auto shop. The ringleader, Chester Lamb, is surprised to find that Sam and the kids from the detention room are still inside the school, since the school security and local police have been paid off to ensure there would be no witnesses. Lamb sends his henchmen to eradicate Decker and the students, directed by Lamb using the school's surveillance and security systems. Sam and the kids work together to defeat the armed robbers, and find evidence of a far-reaching plot that includes the police department and high levels of government.

== Cast ==
- Dolph Lundgren as Sam Decker
- Alex Karzis as Chester Lamb
- Kata Dobó as Gloria Waylon
- Corey Sevier as Mick Ashton
- Dov Tiefenbach as Willy Lopez
- K.C. Collins as "Hogie" Hogarth (credited as Chris Collins)
- Mpho Koaho as Jay Tee Barrow
- Larry Day as Earl Hendorf
- Shawn Roberts as Corey Washington
- Jennifer Baxter as Margo Conroy
- Nicole Dicker as Charlee Tuckle
- Richard Yearwood as Leon
- Joseph Scoren as Viktor
- Anthony J. Mifsud as Alek
- Roy Lewis as Lyle Nesson
- Dan Willmott as Sergeant Phil Axel
- Joseph Griffin as Phil Macer
