= Samantha Taylor =

Canadian television host

- Born: 1958 (age 67–68); Toronto, Ontario
- Occupations: Television personality, Video jockey

Samantha Taylor (née Myroslava Lastivka Lydia Luciw; born 1958) is a Canadian radio and television personality from Toronto. She is perhaps best known as the host of the popular CBC Television music video program Video Hits from 1984 to 1989.

== Bio ==
=== Early life ===
Born to Ukrainian parents in Toronto, Taylor's family moved to Pennsylvania when she was three years old. She began her broadcasting career while a student at Pennsylvania State University, using her birth name Myra Luciw as host of the Ukrainian students' radio program on the university radio station while also using the pseudonym Michele Michaels at a commercial station she was an intern.

After graduation, Taylor worked briefly in Washington, D.C., before returning to Toronto in 1980, where she was hired as station librarian and part-time disc jockey for Q-107. At Q-107 she rose to become the station's music director. During that same period she also began hosting CFMT's Metro Music show, giving her the music video experience that would lead to the eventual job with CBC's Video Hits in 1984. On Metro Music she typically introduced the videos and then answered phone calls live on air from fans in the Toronto area. While later working for the CBC, Taylor also judged some episodes of the network's 1985 battle of the bands competition series Rock Wars.

=== Video Hits success ===
In an era in which many viewers across Canada, particularly in non-urban areas, did not have access to cable television programming such as MTV and MuchMusic, Video Hits quickly became the best bet for many viewers to see the latest hit music videos. As the show's popularity grew, Taylor came to be regarded as "Canada's coolest young lady". At its peak, the show attracted one million viewers weekly and drew higher ratings than any other music video program in Canada.
