= Welcome to Sudden Death =

- Directed by: Dallas Jackson
- Screenplay by: Dallas Jackson and Gene Quintano
- Produced by: Griff Furst; Rhonda Baker
- Starring: Michael Jai White; Gary Owen; Michael Eklund; Marrese Crump
- Cinematography: Mark Irwin
- Edited by: Eric Potter; Irit Raz
- Music by: Howard Drossin
- Production companies: SD2 Films; Universal 1440 Entertainment
- Distributed by: Universal Pictures Home Entertainment
- Release date: September 29, 2020
- Running time: 81 minutes
- Country: United States
- Language: English

Welcome to Sudden Death is a 2020 American sports action film directed by Dallas Jackson and starring Michael Jai White, Gary Owen, Michael Eklund and Marrese Crump.

It is a remake of the 1995 film Sudden Death, which starred Jean-Claude Van Damme as a former firefighter battling hostage takers during game seven of the National Hockey League's Stanley Cup Final. Like the original, Welcome to Sudden Death is a single-location action film in the mold of Die Hard, with the conceit that the heist storyline runs parallel to, and sometimes intersects with, a sports contest. The new version transfers the action from an ice hockey to a basketball setting, and trims down the sports subplot significantly.

The film was produced by Universal Studios under their Universal 1440 imprint, in partnership with Netflix. It premiered on 29 September 2020.

== Plot ==
A commando unit led by Alpha (Michael Eklund) and his ruthless right-hand man Omega (Marrese Crump) takes control of a Phoenix, Arizona sports arena during the season opener of the fictional National Basketball League, pitting the hometown Falcons against the New York Knights. Alpha is a disgraced counterterrorist with a grudge towards arena owner and new media billionaire Diana Smart (Sabryn Rock), who funded an investigation into his unit's abuse of power. Security guard and former US Army Special Forces veteran Jesse Freeman (Michael Jai White) teams with the arena's janitor Gus (Gary Owen) in an attempt to stop the assailants and rescue his daughter Mara (Nakai Takawira), who has been taken hostage alongside Smart and her entourage.

== Cast ==
- Michael Jai White as Jesse Freeman
- Gary Owen as Gus
- Michael Eklund as Jobe Davis/Alpha
- Marrese Crump as Omega
- Sabryn Rock as Diana Smart
- Anthony Grant as Milli
- Nakai Takawira as Mara Freeman
- Lyric Justice as Ryan Freeman
- Anthony "Mif" Mifsud as Devlin Montez
- Gillian White as Gamma
- Sagine Sémajuste as Alisha Freeman

Kristen Harris and Paul Essiembre appear as the mayor and governor, respectively. Sean Skene, Stephanie Sy, Jeff Strome, B.J. Verot and Adam Hurtig appear as the remaining members of Alpha's commando.

== Production ==
=== Development ===
Following informal mentions of the impending remake by director Dallas Jackson, including in a June 2019 interview with the Los Angeles Sentinel, Netflix officially announced the project in August of that year, promising a humorous take on its 1995 inspiration. Kim Todd was listed as one of the producers, however Rhonda Baker is credited in the finished film.

A new sidekick character, Gus, was added to the story by Jackson. The role was given to comedian Gary Owen, who had previously supported Michael Jai White in Universal's Undercover Brother 2. White recommended Michael Eklund for the role of main villain Alpha, based on his performance in 2011's Tactical Force, which co-starred himself and Steve Austin. The star's spouse and frequent on-screen partner Gillian White also joined the project, as did his go-to fight choreographer Larnell Stovall.
Several contributors to the picture, such as Jackson, Crump and musician Howard Drossin, are part of Robert "RZA" Diggs' extended artistic circle, and Diggs' record company provided most of the songs heard on its soundtrack.
Irit Raz, an Undisputed franchise alumn with some familiarity for Stovall and White's style, was the original choice to edit the film. Eric Potter was later brought in at Universal's behest. This resulted in some interference with White's vision, as the studio-appointed editor relied on an abundance of quick cuts, which are often used to enhance the performances of non-martial artists in mainstream action cinema.

Welcome to Sudden Death was originally slated for a June 2020 release, then delayed to late September of that year.

=== Filming ===
Welcome to Sudden Death was shot in Winnipeg and Selkirk, Manitoba, Canada. Principal photography was scheduled to begin on 6 August and wrap up on 4 September 2019. Cinematography was handled by Canadian Mark Irwin, who earlier in his career lensed another film in the same genre, Passenger 57.

The film used Winnipeg's Bell MTS Place as a stand-in for Phoenix's fictional Odyssey Center. Some backgrounds hint at the film's actual shooting location, such as a food stand named the Aviators' Grill—after the Winnipeg Jets—and selling poutine, a traditional Canadian dish that is seldom offered in basketball arenas of the Southwestern United States.

The production relied on local talent for its basketball sequences. Fort Richmond's Dan Becker, a former NCAA player with the Colorado Buffaloes, appears as the New York Knights' head coach and helped stage the on-court action. He previously served as an actor and consultant for the ESPN college basketball drama A Season on the Brink: The Bobby Knight Story, which was also shot in Winnipeg.

== Release ==
In the United States, Welcome to Sudden Death premiered on 29 September 2020 on DVD, and on VOD via Netflix and FandangoNow. On Netflix, the film peaked at number 4 among feature films during the weekend following its release. On FandangoNow, which operates on a pay-per-view model and ranks programs by revenue, the film was priced at the standard $5.99 and ranked 7th for the week ending 4 October 2020. Flix-Patrol.com, which uses a proprietary point system, ranked Welcome to Sudden Death as the 18th most popular feature film on Netflix USA for the month of October 2020.

In the UK, the film premiered on Sky Cinema/Now TV on 13 March 2021. The physical version followed on 22 March, and reached 11th place in the national DVD sales chart.

== Reception ==
The film's critical reception was generally unfavorable, with most reviewers bemoaning its generic look and sound. Some felt that the sports/crime crossover was not as smoothly executed as in the original, in part due to some narrative twists, such as the titular sudden death, not translating well to professional basketball.
Opinions were divided on the film's humor, and most praise was directed at its dynamic martial arts sequences, which made good use of White and Crump's natural charisma.

Veteran critic Roger Moore summed up his thoughts by stating, "This slow-footed, jokey, half-assed remake of Jean-Claude Van Damme's Sudden Death is better than it has any right to be, mostly thanks to White. That's still not very good, alas."

Welcome to Sudden Death: Original Motion Picture Soundtrack

Soundtrack album by various artists
- Released: September 25, 2020
- Genre: Orchestral; Hip hop
- Length: 38:46
- Label: Back Lot Records

Singles from Welcome to Sudden Death
- 1. "Action Jaxon" Released: 28 August 2020; 2. "Hands Up (Outlaws)" Released: 18 September 2020

== Soundtrack ==
The film's soundtrack album has been released digitally by Back Lot Records, a subsidiary of NBCUniversal that has issued soundtracks for many of their properties. It was preceded by two digital singles. The album features two tracks from the original score by composer/arranger Howard Drossin, one song by Anthony Grant (who plays rapper Milli in the film), and a further nine songs under licence from 36 Chambers Records.

The song "How I Could Just Kill A Man" by Cypress Hill also features in one of the film's climactic scenes, although it does not appear on the soundtrack album.

No.	Title	Performed by	Length
1.	"Glide Like A Laker (T.R.O.N.)"	Cory Ironside, Weather Park & Core Masson	4:02
2.	"Hands Up (Outlaws)"	Crooked I feat. Joell Ortiz	3:08
3.	"Wu Battle Beat"	Hue Hef	3:29
4.	"Never Seen A Dead Man Breathe"	DMNQ LNDN & 100RAW	2:59
5.	"SD Boom"	Aki Starr & Makaylah	3:28
6.	"New Beast Mix"	Mane Azeem, ERule & Born Allah	3:33
7.	"Buddy (King Tech Groove Remix)"	We Don't Ride Llamas & King Tech	2:45
8.	"Action Jaxon"	Chris Rivers, Don Prynce & Hue Hef feat. 3ARTH	4:44
9.	"Booty Clap"	Anthony Grant	3:59
10.	"Locker Fight"	Howard Drossin	1:44
11.	"The Rafters"	Howard Drossin	2:10
12.	"Buddy (King Tech Dance Remix)"	We Don't Ride Llamas & King Tech	2:45
Total length:			38:46
