= Nomadic Massive =

Canadian hip hop supergroup

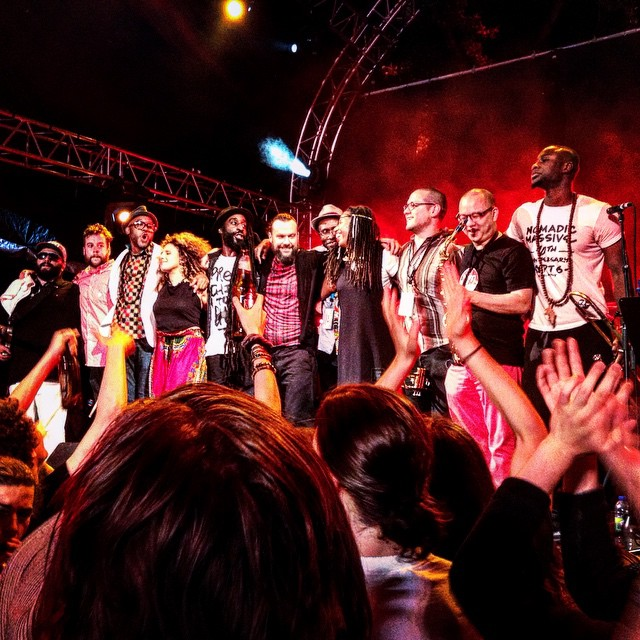
- Nomadic Massive in 2015

Background information
- Origin: Montreal, Quebec, Canada
- Genres: Hip hop, World music
- Years active: 2002–present
- Labels: Monde; Outside Music; Les Faux-Monnayeurs
- Members: Waahli; Lou Piensa; Butta Beats; Ali Sepu
- Past members: Vox Sambou; Sayen; Narcy; Taliwah; Meryem Saci; Rawgged MC; DJ Statik; Hest 1
- Website: nomadicmassive.com

Nomadic Massive is an independent Canadian hip-hop collective based in Montreal. The group formed in 2004, and has since performed globally. The fundamentalist ensemble consists of multi-instrumentalists and rotates members depending on the song. The members include rappers, singers, keyboardists, saxophonists, trumpeters, trombonists, guitarists, bassists, and drummers.

Some of the group's roster includes Waahli, Modibo Keita, Meduza Ma'at, Jason "Blackbird" Selman, Butta Beats, Diegal Leger, Tali a.k.a Iam Blackgirl, Lou Piensa, Ali Sepu, and Vox Sambou.

As a multicultural group, Nomadic Massive songs are in English, French, Haitian Creole, Spanish, Swahili, and Arabic. In 2024, the band celebrated its 20th anniversary in Montreal. Their genre has been described as an Afro-Latin take on hip-hop, and have performed at the Montreal International Jazz Festival for several years.

== History ==
Lou Piensa and Vox Sambou met in Winnipeg in 1995 and began making music together in Montreal. In 2004, the duo was invited to participate in the Cuban Hip Hop Festival in Havana, Cuba. They invited several friends to join them, and Nomadic Massive attended the festival as a seven-person collective. After spending two months in Cuba collaborating with local artists, they returned to Montreal to record a mixtape and organize shows to present their experience. The group then decided to perform between Montreal and Toronto.

In 2005, the group released their first EP, Nomad's Land. The group continued performing across Canada and returned to Havana in 2006. In 2008, they organized a tour in São Paulo, Brazil, producing a new mixtape with local artists. In 2009, Outside Music offered them a national distribution deal for their self-titled album.

In 2012, the group released the mixtape Supafam, which was distributed digitally and on 300 exclusive cassette tapes.

In 2016, Nomadic Massive launched The Big Band Theory on the Coop Les Faux-Monnoyeurs label. The album incorporated elements of soul, jazz, and funk music while addressing political and social justice themes.

From 2017 to 2019, the band toured Europe twice yearly and recorded the EP Miwa (2018) and album Times (2019). They represented Canada at the 2019 Cervantino Festival in Mexico. In November 2019, they celebrated their 15th anniversary in Montreal as part of Mundial Montreal.

In 2022, the band toured internationally, including a week-long project in Paraguay where they recorded Pocket Full of Lingo. This was followed by shows in New York and Marseille. Their single "Fly Sh*t", filmed in Marseille, was released in July 2023 during their Mexico tour at the Querétaro Experimental Festival. In 2024, their EP Out of Town was released.

== Performance highlights ==
Selected notable appearances include:

- Festival Internacional Cervantino, Guanajuato, Mexico (2019).
- BRIC Celebrate Brooklyn Festival, Brooklyn, US (2014; with Deltron 3030).
- Festival International de Jazz de Montréal, multiple years (e.g., 2015 archive listing).
- TD Vancouver International Jazz Festival, Vancouver, Canada (2014 program guide).
- Festival de Marseille, Marseille, France (festival program page).

Further coverage of their Montreal Jazz Festival sets appears in independent reviews.

== Active founding members ==
=== Lou Piensa ===
In 2007, Piensa co-founded NoBad Sound Studio, a music studio for youth affiliated with Maison des Jeunes Côte-des-Neiges, where he and bandmate Butta Beats conduct workshops. In 2015, he founded The Loop Pilots with producer Dr. MaD. In 2016, they helped establish Up Next Studio at James Lyng High School.

=== Waahli ===
Waahli (also known as Wyzah) is a rapper, freestyler, and guitarist from Montreal. Born to Haitian parents, he is self-taught and performs both as a solo artist and as a member of Nomadic Massive. Waahli has released the instrumental EP SoapFactory Vol. 1 (2011) and SoapFactory Vol. 2 (2012), which he showcased at Artbeat Montreal Revelation in 2012.

=== Ali Sepu ===
Ali Sepu is an Ottawa-born guitarist and producer who began playing at age twelve. Influenced by Andean folk, blues, and 1970s psychedelic music, he later incorporated hip-hop–style looping before switching to a Stratocaster for live performances.

=== Butta Beats ===
Butta Beats is an Argentinian beatboxer, MC, multi-instrumentalist, and producer. He co-hosted WEFUNK Radio with DJ Static and Professor Groove and collaborated with Ali Sepu on the Iron Chef Project, blending South American folk influences with urban music. In 2007, he co-founded NoBad Sound Studio at Maison des Jeunes Côte-des-Neiges to lead youth workshops, and in 2016 helped establish Up Next Studio at James Lyng High School.

== Past members ==
=== Nantali Indongo ===
Nantali Indongo (also known as Tali, IamBlackgirl, IBG, or Taliwah) is a Caribbean singer, songwriter, and MC. She studied literature at the University of Ottawa and earned a graduate certificate in journalism from Humber College. Indongo is the daughter of activist Kennedy Frederick, one of the six original plaintiffs in the Sir George Williams Affair. In 2015, she appeared in the documentary film Ninth Floor, which examines those 1969 protests.

Indongo co-founded Hip Hop No Pop, an educational workshop series exploring hip-hop culture’s nonviolent origins and encouraging storytelling and confidence in youth. She serves on the board of Maison des Jeunes de la Côte-des-Neiges.

As a journalist, Indongo reports for CBC Radio Montréal and hosts the network's arts-and-culture program The Bridge. She has also contributed to Radio-Canada's Plus On Est Fou, Plus On Lit and other ICI Musique shows.

=== Meryem Saci ===
Meryem Saci (also known as Meduza Ma'at) is an Algerian singer, songwriter, and MC. Born in Algiers, she immigrated to Canada in 2000. Fluent in Arabic and French, she learned English from hip-hop artists such as Wu-Tang Clan, Big L, Fugees, and Public Enemy. Saci joined Nomadic Massive in 2005, attracted by the group's focus on positive social change.

While mentoring and teaching workshops at Maison des Jeunes de la Côte-des-Neiges, Saci earned a commerce degree and a real estate licence, and began studies in political science. She contributed vocals to soundtracks for the television series Lance et Compte, Sur le rythme (On the Beat), Omertà, and the Netflix series Iron Fist (2017). In March 2017, she released her debut single "Concrete Jungle", and her solo album On My Way was released on 1 June 2017.

=== Rawgged MC ===
Diegal Léger (stage name Rawgged MC) was born in Port-au-Prince, Haiti, and moved to Montreal in 1982. A founder of Concordia University's Students for the Advancement of Hip Hop Culture, he organised the International Symposium on Hip Hop Culture in Montreal (2002–2005, 2009) and Port-au-Prince (September 2011). Léger is also a founding member of Solid'Ayiti, promoting cooperation between artistic and academic communities in Montreal and Haiti.

=== Vox Sambou ===
Vox Sambou, born in Limbe, Haiti, is a singer and songwriter who performs in Creole, English, French, and Spanish. He holds a bachelor's degree in psychology and anthropology. From 2005 to 2015, he directed the Maison des Jeunes de la Côte-des-Neiges, a non-profit organization supporting at-risk youth in Montreal.

As a solo artist, Sambou released his debut album, Lakay, in 2008, followed by Dyasporafriken, which blends reggae and traditional Haitian music.

Sambou co-founded Solid'Ayiti, an organisation promoting cooperation between Haitian and Montreal artistic and academic communities.

== Mentorship ==
=== NoBad Sound Studio ===
NoBad Sound Studio is a youth music centre affiliated with Maison des Jeunes de la Côte-des-Neiges in Montreal's Côte-des-Neiges–Notre-Dame-de-Grâce borough. Founded in 2007 by Nomadic Massive members Butta Beats and Lou Piensa, it offers weekly workshops in beatboxing, rap, music production, DJing, singing, and performance skills.

From 2009 it produced professional recordings on CD, enabling young artists to work with industry staff on socially conscious projects. In 2010, Studio participants travelled to Toronto to perform and speak at the Regent Park International Film Festival.

In 2014, the Studio launched an all-female initiative that formed the trio Strange Froots, hailed by Vox Sambou as "the pride of NoBad Sound Studio and of the Maison des Jeunes".

=== Strange Froots ===
Strange Froots is an all-female hip-hop trio formed in 2014 at NoBad Sound Studio by members Mags, Naïka Champaïgne, and SageS. The group takes its name from Billie Holiday's song "Strange Fruit".

They debuted with an eponymous EP at the Hip Hop You Don't Stop festival in September 2014 and released the EP Blossom This Froot for Thought in July 2016 through Concordia University's student radio CJLO 1690AM artist residency. The group composed the score for the short film Mahalia Melts in the Rain (2018). SageS departed the group in spring 2021.

== Discography ==
=== Albums ===
- Nomad's Land (2006)
- Nomadic Massive (2009)
- The Big Band Theory (2016)
- Times (2019)

=== EPs ===
- Nomads Land EP (2005)
- Any Sound (2013)
- MIWA (2018)
- Out of Town (2024)

=== Mixtapes ===
- The Canada-Cuba Get-Down (2004)
- The Brazil-Canada Get-down (2008)
- Supafam (2012)
- The Radio-Tape (2015)
