= Just Business =

2008 film directed by Jonathan Dueck

- DVD cover
- Directed by: Jonathan Dueck
- Written by: David Robbeson
- Produced by: Joshua Gray
- Starring: Gina Gershon; Jonathan Watton; Earl Pastko; Zachary Bennett; Anthony J. Mifsud; Tony Bloom
- Edited by: Mitch Lackie
- Music by: Ryan Latham
- Production company: Peace Arch Motion Pictures
- Distributed by: Peace Arch
- Release date: May 6, 2008
- Running time: 85 min
- Country: Canada
- Language: English

Just Business is a 2008 Canadian thriller film directed by Jonathan Dueck and starring Gina Gershon, Jonathan Watton, Earl Pastko, and Zachary Bennett. The movie was released on DVD on May 6, 2008.

== Plot ==
Elizar Perla is a retired art thief intent on committing his last crime. He targets David Gray, a famous art and rarities collector. Once the job is done, he disappears. Then the story focuses on the aftermath of the crime as the wealthy collector is desperate to get one particular painting back. Perla's daughter, lawyer Marty, agrees to track the missing artwork as her father is the main suspect (hence the name of the film).

== Cast ==
- Gina Gershon as Marty Jameson
- Jonathan Watton as David Gray
- Earl Pastko as Eli Perla
- Zachary Bennett as David Snow
- John Robinson as Tom Esposito
- Anthony J. Mifsud as Tony Bloom
