= Sagine Sémajuste =

Haitian Canadian actress

- Born: Ottawa, Ontario, Canada
- Education: American Musical and Dramatic Academy
- Years active: 2012–present
- Website: www.saginesemajuste.com

Sagine Sémajuste is a Haitian Canadian actress and dancer. She is best known for her recurring roles as Farah in the television series 19-2, and Sabine in the television series Grand Army.

She has also appeared in the films Mahalia Melts in the Rain, Akilla's Escape and Faith Heist, and the television series St. Nickel, Pretty Hard Cases and The Lake.

== Early life ==
Sémajuste was born and raised in Ottawa, Ontario. She was introduced to hip-hop dancing through Culture Shock Ottawa. She moved to New York to pursue musical theatre, graduating from the American Musical and Dramatic Academy (AMDA) before moving back to Canada, where she is now based in Toronto.

== Filmography ==
=== Film ===
Year	Title	Role	Notes
2013	Good News	Kora	Short film
2015	The Gift	Anne	Short film
2018	Mahalia Melts in the Rain	Anika	Short film
2020	Akilla's Escape	Selah	
2020	Welcome to Sudden Death	Alisha	

=== Television ===
Year	Title	Role	Notes
2015	Lost Girl	Dedona	2 episodes
2015	Backpackers	Mandy	Episode: "Andrew's Version"
2015	Heroes Reborn	Sylvia	Episode: "Odessa"
2015	Hemlock Grove	Woman	Episode: "Todos Santos"
2016	Shadowhunters	Waitress	Episode: "Major Arcana"
2016	The Rocky Horror Picture Show: Let's Do the Time Warp Again	Singer	Television film
2016	St Lucie	Lucie	
2017	19-2	Farah Miller	7 episodes
2018	Unforgiving	Andrea	
2019	The Bold Type	Rachel	Episode: "Breaking Through the Noise"
2020	Grand Army	Sabine Pierre	4 episodes
2020	Marry Me This Christmas	Shana	Television film
2021	Faith Heist	Vanessa Wright	Television film
2021	Private Eyes	Laila Maxton	Episode: "Smart Home Alone"
2022	Pretty Hard Cases	Crystal Smith	3 episodes
2022	The Lake	Teesa	2 episodes
2024	Beyond Black Beauty	Janelle Dumont	Series regular
