= James Bulliard =

Canadian actor

- Born: 1978 or 1979 (age 47–48); Switzerland
- Education: Trinity College, Northern Secondary School
- Occupations: Actor, comedy writer
- Father: Joe Bodolai

James Bulliard (born August 23, 1978) is a Canadian actor known for his roles in On The Line, The Mystery Files of Shelby Woo, That Was Then, and others.

== Early life and education ==
Born in Bern, Switzerland, he moved to Canada at the age of three and began his career on a radio program called Not the History of Rock and Roll at the age of six (for which he received an ACTRA award nomination.) While attending Trinity College, Toronto, he won the college's award for Best Actor for his portrayal of Sir John Barrymore in a production of Paul Rudnick's I Hate Hamlet.

== Career ==
Bulliard's first role in a feature film occurred in 1993, when he appeared in the movie Ordinary Magic, starring Glenn Headly and Ryan Reynolds.

Although his work has been concentrated mainly in Canada and consisted of guest roles on such series as Tekwar, The Mystery Files of Shelby Woo and Real Kids, Real Adventures, his first big break occurred in 2001, when he was cast as "Randy" in On The Line.

The movie was a relative flop at the box office, but soon after it garnered Bulliard some attention from south of the border, and he was cast as the lead character in the now-defunct 2002 ABC drama That Was Then. The show lasted only two weeks before being pulled from the network lineup, due to poor ratings.

After the cancellation of That Was Then, Bulliard picked up a few sparse guest roles on such series as Mutant X, Relic Hunter and NYPD Blue, but for the most part his career fizzled out after his short-lived success with That Was Then. In July 2006, he was interviewed by Los Angeles writer Tim Coyne on "The Hollywood Podcast"; during this interview he narrated the events of his life both before and after the collapse of the show.

== Filmography ==
=== Film ===
Year	Title	Role	Notes
1993	Ordinary Magic	Mick	
2001	Full Disclosure	Randy	
2001	On the Line	Randy Francis	
2007	Women on Top	Ken Simons	

=== Television ===
Year	Title	Role	Notes
1995	TekWar	Luke Grey	Episode: "Killer Instinct"
1995	The Great Defender	1st Student	Episode: "Def Poets Society"
1998	The Mystery Files of Shelby Woo	Kyle	Episode: "The Yearbook Mystery"
1999	Tales from the Cryptkeeper	Tom	Episode: "Competitive Spirit"
1999	Earth: Final Conflict	Darren Vorhees	Episode: "Déjà Vu"
2000	Psi Factor	Dave	Episode: "Tyler/Tim"
2001	Blue Murder	Glen Coulis	Episode: "Black Sheep"
2001	Relic Hunter	Dan Bernstein	Episode: "Eyes of Toklamanee"
2001	Sanctuary	Bobby	Television film
2001	A Glimpse of Hell	Tim Sykes	Television film
2001	Acceptable Risk	Billy	Television film
2001	Leap Years	Bartender	Episode: "Pilot"
2002	Guilt by Association	Mark	Television film
2002	That Was Then	Travis Glass	7 episodes
2003	Mutant X	Burke	Episode: "The Hand of God"
2004	NYPD Blue	Andy Manooghian	Episode: "The Vision Thing"
2009	24	Patrick	Episode: "Day 7: 8:00 p.m.-9:00 p.m."
