= Kyra Phillips =

American journalist

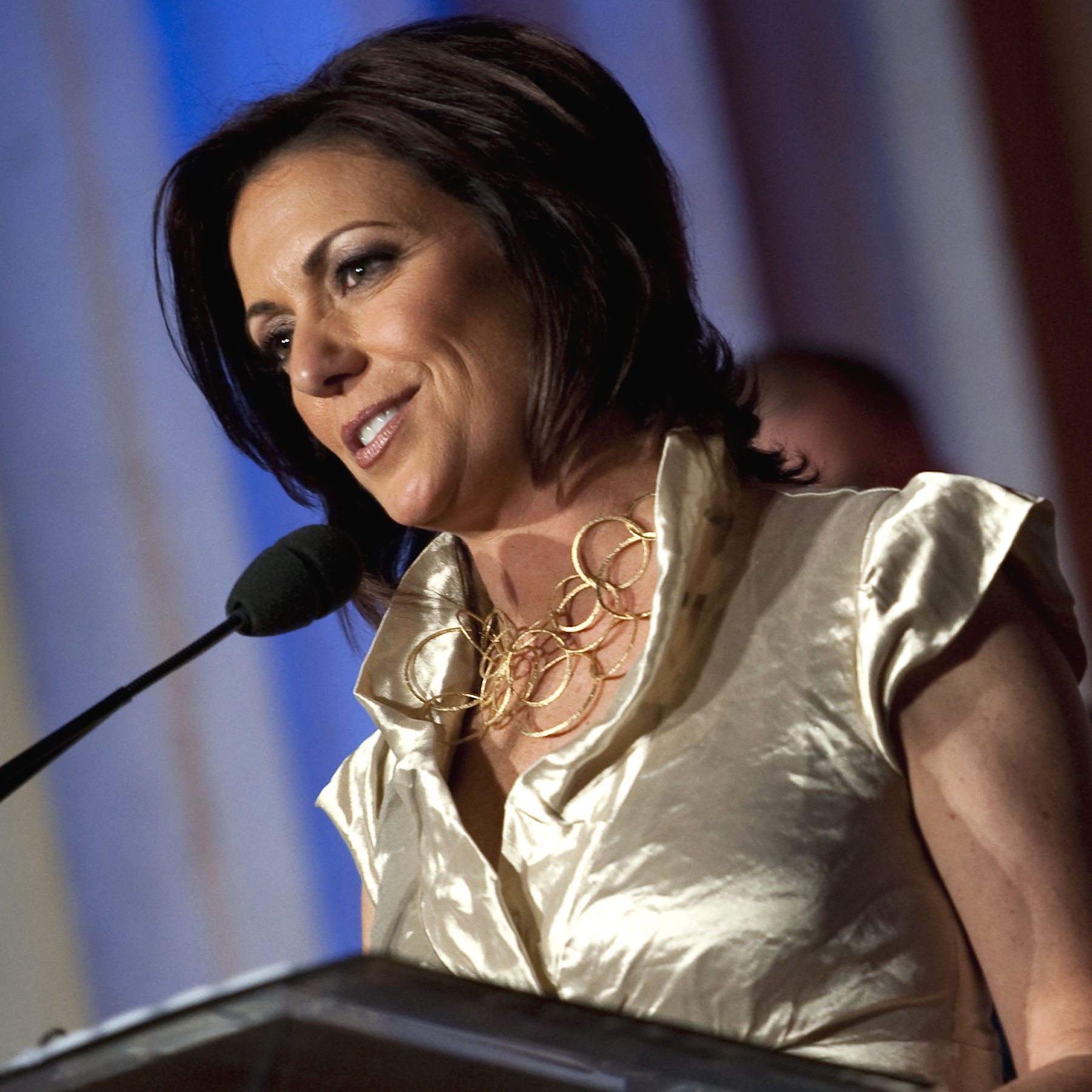
- Philips in 2010
- Born: August 8, 1968 (age 58); Jacksonville, Illinois, U.S.
- Education: University of Southern California
- Occupations: News anchor, reporter
- Notable credit(s): AP Reporter of the Year, 1997
- Title: Anchor
- Spouses: John Assad (m. 2000; div. 2008): John Roberts
- Children: 2 (with Roberts)
- Website: www.kyraphillips.com

Kyra Phillips (born August 8, 1968) is a correspondent for ABC News.

== Early life and career ==
Phillips was born in Illinois, and grew up in the city of Jacksonville. In the fourth grade, she moved to San Diego, California, where her parents became professors at San Diego State University. After graduating from Helix High School, Phillips earned a bachelor's degree in journalism from University of Southern California. Among her first jobs in broadcasting were the positions of weekend anchor and reporter for WLUK-TV in Green Bay, Wisconsin, before moving on to WDSU-TV in New Orleans, Louisiana, in 1994. Phillips has also held positions as morning anchor for KAMC-TV in Lubbock, Texas, field producer for CNN-Telemundo’s Washington, D.C., offices and a journalist of the special assignment unit of KCBS-TV in Los Angeles, California. Phillips participates in the Brain Tumor Foundation for Children, T.A.P.S. (Tragedy Assistance Program for Survivors), Global Down Syndrome Foundation and Big Brothers Big Sisters of America, which she has been involved with since 1992.

== Career ==
=== CNN ===
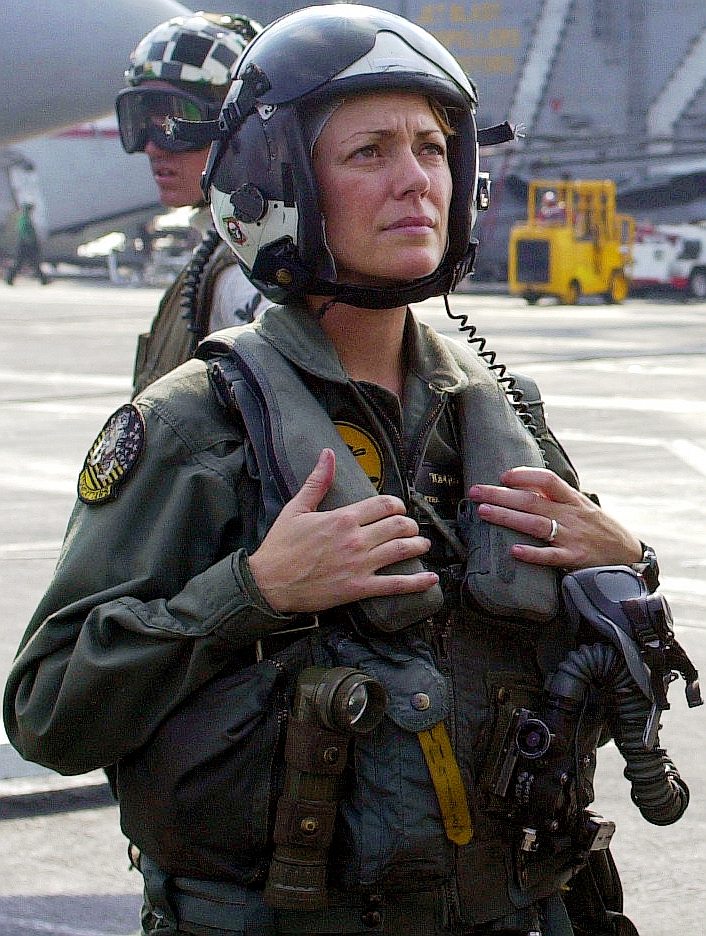
Phillips prepares to board an F-14 Tomcat aboard USS Abraham Lincoln in October 2002.

Phillips joined CNN in 1999. During her early years at CNN, Phillips was granted access to U.S. Navy Air Wing CVW-9 in 2001 as they prepared for the war in Afghanistan. In January 2002, Phillips spent about a month in Antarctica to work on a television documentary to be featured on the program CNN Presents. Later in 2002, Phillips produced reports focusing on the U.S. Navy's reconnaissance missions from the destroyer USS Paul Hamilton, the Navy's Special Operations Command, the Navy SEALs, and Special Warfare Combatant Crewman training, riding in an F-14 Tomcat during an air-to-air combat mission over the Persian Gulf. She has also participated in the Navy's TOPGUN school, SWAT training, and other police and weapons training.

In 2003, she was an embedded journalist during the 2003 invasion of Iraq, where she reported from the aircraft carrier USS Abraham Lincoln. In 2006, Phillips was the last journalist to fly in an F-14 Tomcat before its official retirement from service in the U.S. Navy.

Phillips was criticized for her insensitivity during an April 16, 2003, interview with Dr Imad al-Najada, the doctor of Ali Ismail Abbas, a 12-year-old boy who lost 15 relatives and both arms when a U.S. missile hit his home in Baghdad. Discussing live images of the 2006 labor protests in France, in which it was later determined that no one was killed, she said that the images of the demonstrations "Sort of brings back memories of Tiananmen Square, when you saw these activists in front of tanks." CNN's Chris Burns told French Foreign Minister Philippe Douste-Blazy that her comments were "regrettable."

On August 29, 2006, during a CNN broadcast of President George W. Bush's speech on the first anniversary of Hurricane Katrina's landfall, Phillips's microphone was left on while she was in the washroom. Portions of a personal conversation were broadcast live, during which Phillips offered advice on men, criticized her sister-in-law for being a "control freak", and praised her then-husband. The conversation audio was mixed with the President's audio feed and both were discernible. Daryn Kagan broke into Phillips's comments with an audio recap of Bush's speech. CNN immediately apologized for the on-air gaffe. Phillips later appeared on CBS' Late Show with David Letterman poking fun at herself in retrospect.

Phillips co-anchored CNN Radio's November 4, 2008, election coverage with Capitol Hill correspondent Lisa Desjardins.

In March 2012, Phillips moved to the 11am Newsroom, and her timeslot was shortened to one hour. However, on June 26, 2012, it was officially announced that she would leave CNN and launch her own show at its sister channel HLN. She soon returned to CNN as an "investigative correspondent".

=== ABC ===
Phillips with ABC in 2026

On April 2, 2018, Phillips left CNN to join ABC News as a "D.C.-based correspondent".

On July 19, 2019, Phillips posted a tweet praising President Trump for "giving us [journalists] access on a regular basis and the ability to ask any question." Democrats and other journalists criticized the comment as being overly deferential.

== Awards ==
In 1997, Phillips was named Reporter of the Year by the Associated Press. She has also won six Emmy Awards, two Edward R. Murrow Awards for investigative reporting, the top documentary award from the Society of Professional Journalists for her coverage of Jena, Louisiana, and multiple Golden Microphone awards.

== Personal life ==
Having been married to John Assad from 2000 to 2008, Phillips became engaged to Fox News correspondent John Roberts in 2010. She gave birth to their twins in March 2011. As of 2018, the couple are married.
