= Melanie Darrow =

1997 American television film

- Directed by: Gary Nelson
- Starring: Delta Burke; Brian Bloom; Christopher Birt
- Country of origin: United States
- Original language: English

Original release
- Release: August 20, 1997

Melanie Darrow is a 1997 American television film directed by Gary Nelson and starring Delta Burke, Brian Bloom and Christopher Birt.

== Plot ==
A lawyer takes on the case of a man accused of murdering his wealthy wife.

== Cast ==
- Delta Burke as Melanie Darrow
- Brian Bloom as Det. Lou Darrow
- Christopher Birt as Dwight
- Bruce Abbott as Alex Kramer
- Wendel Meldrum as Diane
- Jonathan Banks as Arthur Abbot
- Shawn Ashmore as David Abbott
- Krista Bridges as Claire
- Anthony J. Mifsud as Carlo Erhardt

== Reception ==
Variety said of the film, "Nelson doesn’t bring much reality or humor to the thin telefare, and chances of Burke’s Melanie getting many more cases seem minimal."
