= Sanctuary (2001 film) =

2001 television film directed by Katt Shea

- Based on: Sanctuary by Nora Roberts
- Written by: Katt Shea; Vivienne Radkoff
- Directed by: Katt Shea
- Starring: Melissa Gilbert; Costas Mandylor; Chris William Martin; Leslie Hope; Kenneth Welsh
- Music by: Danny B. Harvey
- Country of origin: United States
- Original language: English

Production
- Executive producers: Andrew Adelson; Tracey Alexander
- Producer: Frank Siracusa
- Cinematography: Wally Pfister
- Editor: Henk Van Eeghen
- Running time: 85 minutes
- Production companies: CBS Productions; Adelson Entertainment

Original release
- Network: CBS
- Release: February 28, 2001

Sanctuary is a 2001 American made-for-television thriller film written and directed by Katt Shea from a 1997 book by Nora Roberts. It stars Melissa Gilbert and Costas Mandylor.

== Cast ==
- Melissa Gilbert as Jo Ellen Hathaway
- Costas Mandylor as Nathan Delaney
- Chris William Martin as Brian Hathaway (credited as Chris Martin)
- Leslie Hope as Kirby Fitzsimmons
- Kenneth Welsh as Sam Hathaway
- Kathy Baker as Aunt Kate
- John Ralston as David Delaney
- Robin Brûlé as Ginny
- Kristen Ross as Annabelle Hathaway
- Booth Savage as Sheriff Bill Duer
- Wayne Robson as Cappy
- James Bulliard as Bobby
