= Mahalia Melts in the Rain =

2018 film

- Film poster
- Directed by: Émilie Mannering; Carmine Pierre-Dufour
- Written by: Carmine Pierre-Dufour
- Produced by: Sarah Mannering; Fanny Drew
- Starring: Kaiyonni Banton-Renner; Sagine Sémajuste
- Cinematography: Olivier Gossot
- Edited by: Myriam Magassouba
- Music by: Strange Froots
- Production company: Colonelle Films
- Distributed by: Travelling Distribution
- Release date: October 1, 2018 (VIFF)
- Running time: 12 minutes
- Country: Canada
- Language: English

Mahalia Melts in the Rain is a Canadian short drama film, directed by Émilie Mannering and Carmine Pierre-Dufour and released in 2018.

The film stars Kaiyonni Banton-Renner as Mahalia, a Black Canadian girl who feels self-conscious about her kinky hair setting her apart from her ballet school classmates, leading her mother Anika (Sagine Sémajuste) to take her to a hair salon to get it straightened.

The film premiered at the 2018 Vancouver International Film Festival. At the 7th Canadian Screen Awards in 2019, it was shortlisted for Best Live Action Short Drama. It won the 2020 edition of CBC Television's annual Short Film Face-Off competition.
