= On the Line (2001 film) =

2001 film by Eric Bross

- Theatrical release poster
- Directed by: Eric Bross
- Written by: Eric Aronson; Paul Stanton
- Produced by: Peter Abrams; Robert L. Levy; Wendy Thorlakson
- Starring: Lance Bass; Joey Fatone
- Cinematography: Michael Bernard
- Edited by: Eric A. Sears
- Music by: Stewart Copeland
- Production companies: Tapestry Films; A Happy Place
- Distributed by: Miramax Films
- Release date: October 26, 2001
- Running time: 85 minutes
- Country: United States
- Language: English
- Budget: $16 million
- Box office: $4.5 million

On the Line is a 2001 American romantic comedy film starring Lance Bass and Joey Fatone. The film was directed by Eric Bross and was written by Eric Aronson and Paul Stanton, based upon their short film of the same name.

== Plot ==
Romantically awkward and shy Kevin Gibbons works in Chicago for an advertising firm. He makes a pitch for Reebok that is rejected, but his colleague Jackie later proposes Kevin's idea, claiming it as her own, and it is approved. While riding the "L" Train home, Kevin meets Abbey, with whom he has an immediate connection and finds they have mutual interests in the Chicago Cubs and Al Green; however, Kevin lets Abbey leave without even learning her name. Lamenting having let her get away, Kevin tries to find Abbey by making posters asking the 'L-Train Girl' to contact him and placing them all over town. He is initially optimistic when he receives the first few calls, but none of them are from Abbey.

Local reporter Brady Frances, an old classmate of Kevin's who still holds a grudge against him because of a girl who rejected him for Kevin, is tasked by the Chicago Daily Post with interviewing Kevin about his search. When Frances's article is published, Kevin is flooded with calls and his roommates — aspiring musician Rod, slacker Eric, and art aficionado Randy — suggest they date the callers, framing it as a way to help filter out all the time wasters. Kevin rejects this idea, but a miscommunication leads Eric to believe that Kevin has approved it. Brady publishes a follow-up article, portraying Kevin as a loser and failure, which results in even more calls from women. Meanwhile, Abbey is having problems with her boyfriend, who lives in Chicago and she was visiting when she met Kevin.

Frances has his girlfriend Julie, who is on Kevin's side, call Kevin posing as the L-Train Girl; she subsequently goes on a date with Rod and informs Frances that Kevin's friends are answering the calls and dating the respondents. Brady reports that Kevin's search is a scam, as a result Reebok declines to work with Kevin and he is taken off the project. Abbey sees Kevin's poster and contacts him but the call is answered by Eric, who arranges a date with her, where he realizes she is the one Kevin is looking for; before he can explain, Abbey leaves the restaurant in disgust. Kevin subsequently sees Abbey waiting for a train and runs after her, but prompted by her meeting with Eric and Frances's story about Kevin, she ignores him. Kevin later becomes angry at Eric after learning he met with Abbey and didn't tell him.

While contemplating giving up, Kevin visits Nathan, his best friend at the firm, in rehab after he suffers a heart attack. Nathan reminisces about meeting his wife at a Chicago Cubs game, where he caught a home run from Cubs legend Ernie Banks, and encourages Kevin to keep looking for Abbey. Jackie apologizes to Kevin for plagiarizing his work and puts him in charge of the billboard campaign. Kevin uses the billboards to publicly ask Abbey to meet him at the train station at 7pm on Friday. Eric tries to make amends with Kevin by placing posters all over town imploring Abbey to attend the meeting, and gives an impassioned speech about love on a train, which Abbey overhears.

Inspired by Kevin wearing his heart on his sleeve, Rod composes a love song; Kevin secretly sends a demo tape of it to rock star Mick Silver, who turns up to see Rod perform at a bar and offers him a record contract. Randy meets a woman who enjoys art as he does, Julie leaves Frances for Rod, and Frances is given an advice column in the Chicago Times. Finally, crowds and TV crews gather at the train station in anticipation as Kevin waits for Abbey; though 7pm passes, Abbey appears and all of Chicago celebrates as she and Kevin are reunited.

== Cast ==
- Lance Bass as Kevin Gibbons
- Joey Fatone as Rod
- Emmanuelle Chriqui as Abbey
- GQ as Eric
- Al Green as Himself
- Dave Foley as Higgins
- Jerry Stiller as Nathan
- Tamala Jones as Jackie
- Richie Sambora as Mick Silver
- Amanda Foreman as Julie
- Dan Montgomery as Brady
- James Bulliard as Randy
- Chyna as Rod's date
- Justin Timberlake as Make-up artist (uncredited)
- Chris Kirkpatrick as Angelo the hairstylist (uncredited)
- Ananda Lewis as Herself
- Sammy Sosa as Himself
- Damon Buford as Himself
- Eric Young as Himself
- Brandi Williams (from Blaque) as Herself

== Production ==
The idea for doing the film came together when NSYNC’s talks of starring in a feature film as a group in the vein of A Hard Day’s Night stalled in late 2000. The film was Lance Bass’s first film through his production company A Happy Place. Bass initially intended to only produce and not star, but decided to act also when the group’s management gave the band a month and a half of downtime before the start of recording for their album Celebrity.

Filming began in mid-March of 2001 with a reported budget of $10 million. The film’s original title was "On the L". The film was primarily shot in Toronto, Ontario, while establishing shots were done in Chicago. Midway through the shoot, NSYNC began recording again, and to accommodate for both the album and the film, Bass and bandmate Joey Fatone continued filming in Toronto during the week and traveled to Orlando on weekends to work with the band. Filming wrapped in late April 2001.

During the film's closing credits, NSYNC members Justin Timberlake and Chris Kirkpatrick appear as comical hair and makeup artists in mock "behind the scenes" footage, doing hair and makeup for Bass, Fatone and Chriqui. JC Chasez had a cameo as a bartender but his scene was cut.

== Soundtrack ==
The film's soundtrack featured songs by teen pop artists Mandy Moore and BBMak, along with previously unreleased tracks by NSYNC and Britney Spears.

== Release ==
Miramax marketed the film heavily towards NSYNC's teen fans, with trailers for the film being shown during the band’s summer PopOdyssey tour. It was released in theaters on October 26, 2001. The film was a box-office flop, grossing only $4.3 million domestically.

Bass attributed the film’s poor box office performance to its release date, which happened a month after the World Trade Center attacks of September 11, 2001. In his 2007 autobiography, Bass wrote, "Halfway through the press junket, the president declared war and that was it — our film was finished. We had wanted to entertain America, to give back some good feelings, but once the country went to war, there was no way our film was going to be on anyone’s top-priority list."

== Critical reception ==
On Rotten Tomatoes, the film has an approval rating of 19% based on 70 reviews, with an average rating of 3.7/10. The site's critics consensus states: "An inept attempt at a romantic comedy aimed at 'NSYNC fans." Metacritic, which uses a weighted average, assigned the film a score of 34 out of 100, based on 23 critics, indicating "generally unfavorable" reviews.

Roger Ebert said the film was "...an agonizingly creaky movie that laboriously plods through a plot so contrived that the only thing real about it is its length." Of the few positive reviews, Stephen Holden of The New York Times called the film "a pleasant wisp of a romantic comedy" and wrote, "If On the Line, directed by Eric Bross from a screenplay by Eric Aronson and Paul Stanton, is a mere trifle, at least it isn't as condescending or transparently synthetic as most niche-marketed daydreams for the high-school and junior-high set. Its mood is bubbly, its music sweetly perky, and Mr. Bass's Kevin is blandly appealing in a passive way."

In 2021, B.L. Panther of The Spool commented how the film, in retrospect, becomes "fascinating" when examined through a queer lens, in light of Bass later coming out as gay. Panther noted that the only openly gay character in the film is "a gasping gay stereotype", while the closing credits scene of Timberlake and Kirkpatrick serves to poke fun at conceptions of homosexuality. Panther wrote, "We can’t help but cringe to see [Bass] have to react to these caricatures of the identity he was forced to hide for so long and, as he reminds us in his autobiography, is actively hiding on screen." He added, "Even the things that make On the Line a critically shit movie are enhanced by a queer reading. With incredibly kitsch practical visuals and a narrative logic that defies linearity, it breaks with the common structure and tone of other romcoms of its time. At times, it feels like scenes are missing, perhaps censored by a hand desperately trying to keep Kevin from jumping the tracks into queerness...That’s what makes On the Line interesting to watch now, 20 years later. It’s not because it’s secretly great, but because we can see the alternative life underneath its train tracks."
