= Brad Giffen =

Canadian news anchor

- Occupations: news anchor, radio personality, disc jockey, VJ, television reporter, television producer
- Years active: 1980s – present
- Children: 2

Brad Giffen is a retired Canadian news anchor who has worked on television in both Canada and the United States.

Over his broadcasting career he has also worked as a radio personality, disc jockey, VJ, television reporter, television producer and voice-over artist.

== Broadcasting career ==
Giffen studied at the Poynter Institute for Advanced Journalism Study. In the late 1980s he was a broadcaster on CHUM-FM radio station in Toronto, Ontario, Canada. He previously was John Majhor's successor veejay on CITY-TV's music video program Toronto Rocks. and he hosted the CBC Television battle of the bands competition Rock Wars.

In 1990, Giffen pivoted to news journalism and became a reporter for CFTO's nightly news program World Beat News (later rebranded as CFTO News in early 1998, and CTV News in 2005).

In 1993, Giffen moved to the United States and became co-anchor of the nightly news on the Fox affiliate KSTU, in Salt Lake City, Utah. Giffen left that post in 1995 to accept a tv news anchor-reporter position in New Orleans.

Giffen anchored ABC affiliate WGNO in New Orleans, Louisiana until 2002. While in New Orleans he also hosted and produced the program ABC26 News This Week.

From 2003 to 2008 he anchored the 5:30PM newscast at ABC affiliate WWSB in Sarasota, Florida.

Giffen returned to Canada in 2008 to work as a news presenter for CTV News Channel. He retired from news broadcasting in 2018 to become a full-time voice-over artist working under the professional name Brad Avenyou.

== Personal life ==
Giffen has two children Ajala and Jordan.

== Awards ==
Giffen was awarded "Best In-Depth News Reporting" by the Utah Broadcaster's Association and "Best Newscast with Special Distinction" by the Louisiana Broadcaster's Association.
