= Gangster Exchange =

- Directed by: Dean Bajramovic
- Written by: Dean Bajramovic
- Produced by: Dean Bajramovic; David Krae
- Starring: Christopher Russell; Nobuya Shimamoto; Aaron Poole
- Cinematography: Kevin C.W. Wong
- Edited by: Robert James Spurway
- Music by: Whitney Baker; Dan Elliot; Senad Senderovic
- Production companies: Aquila Pictures; Gothic Raygun Pictures
- Distributed by: Cinemavault Releasing; Peace Arch Entertainment Group
- Release dates: April 3, 2009 (Beverly Hills); February 19, 2010 (Canada)
- Country: Canada
- Language: English

Gangster Exchange is a 2009 American-Canadian film written and directed by Dean Bajramovic. The film debuted at the Beverly Hills Film Festival on April 3, 2009, where it won the Audience Choice for Best Film. It received generally negative reviews.

== Plot ==
Japanese yakuza team up with Bosnian mobsters to import a toilet made of pure heroin into New York City.

== Cast ==
- Christopher Russell as Marco
- Nobuya Shimamoto as Hiro
- Aaron Poole as Big Dave
- Sarain Boylan as Kendra
- Jasmin Geljo as Gogo Wolf
- Zeljko Kecojevic as Dragan Wolf
- Walter Alza as Sasha
- Steven P. Park as Ozaki
- Denis Akiyama as Takayama
- David Krae as Snowy
- Daniel Park as Kitano
