= John Majhor =

Canadian radio and television host

- Born: 28 November 1953; San Bernardino, California, U.S.
- Died: 23 January 2007 (aged 53); Norwood Young America, Minnesota, U.S.
- Years active: 1975–2006

Walter John Majhor (28 November 1953 – 23 January 2007) was a radio and television host, most noted for his work in Toronto, Ontario, Canada.

== Early years ==
Majhor was born in San Bernardino, California and grew up in various Mid-West states. He graduated from Sturgis Brown High School in Sturgis, South Dakota and attended the University of South Dakota in Vermillion, South Dakota. His radio days began at a small station in Vermillion. He worked for KKLS in Rapid City, South Dakota and WAPE in Jacksonville, Florida before heading north to Canada.

== Radio and television career ==
He is best known for his work in Toronto with various radio and television stations, beginning in 1975 at 1050 CHUM. His television work included one of the first Canadian music video programs, Toronto Rocks.

He remained in Toronto during the 1980s and 1990s except for a stint hosting a radio program in Los Angeles from 1987 to 1990, Then from 1990 to 1993, he became the first lead anchor of E Entertainment Television, and the internationally syndicated late night show After Hours, in which he and Heidi Bohay travelled the world, interviewing top level celebrities. He was the morning man at EZ Rock 97.3 and another stint at CFRB. He was host of the Prime (Canada) show Bon Voyage (1999), Citytv's Lunch Television and CFMT's Video Singles. In his later years, he became the program director and afternoon DJ at 105.5 The Bridge in Charleston, South Carolina.

== Later years and death ==
Majhor left Canada for the United States in the late 1990s to work on radio and television voiceovers. In August 2006, he learned that he had contracted an incurable adenocarcinoma, a form of cancer. He died five months later, age 53, at his home in Young America, Minnesota west of Minneapolis. His ashes were spread in his adopted home state of South Dakota.
