= Video Hits (Canadian TV program) =

Music video program

- Title screen
- Genre: Music television news
- Created by: Sandra Faire
- Presented by: Samantha Taylor (1984–1989); Bryan Elliott (1989–1991); Dan Gallagher (1991–1993)
- Country of origin: Canada
- Original language: English

Original release
- Network: CBC Television
- Release: October 1, 1984 – April 2, 1993

Video Hits is a Canadian music video program broadcast nationally on CBC Television from 1984 to 1993. Created by producer Sandra Faire, Video Hits aired weekday afternoons, and featured promotional music videos of the day's top hit songs from Canadian and international artists, along with artist interviews. The show's original host was Samantha Taylor. A similar music video show, Good Rockin' Tonite, also aired on CBC Television on Friday nights concurrently with Video Hits.

== History ==
Video Hits evolved from a CBC Radio show called Coming Attractions. Produced (and later brought to television) by Sandra Faire in Toronto, Coming Attractions was an entertainment news magazine that ran five days a week. Hosts Patricia White and Bob Karstens presented news from the worlds of music, video, art, theatre, film, TV and fashion. One program per week was devoted solely to music videos, which wound up being the highest-rated segment on Coming Attractions. On October 1, 1984, with MTV gaining in popularity and Canada's own MuchMusic launching that summer, Video Hits premiered with host Samantha Taylor, best known at that time as a radio personality at Toronto's Q-107. Broadcast nationally in Canada, the show was an instant success.

Taylor hosted the show until 1989, until Bryan Elliott took over as host. In 1991, Dan Gallagher assumed hosting duties, and the program's name was changed to Dan Gallagher's Video Hits. Beginning in 1990, the series would sometimes devote a special episode to a single artist under the rubric Video Hits Presents.

But with videos available elsewhere (on MuchMusic), ratings for Video Hits (and Good Rockin' Tonite) dropped sharply, until Video Hits was cancelled in February 1993, airing its last episode on April 2. (Good Rockin' Tonite aired its last episode the following evening, signalling the end of music video programming on the CBC.) Video Hits Presents evolved into the music documentary series Ear to the Ground.

The CBC said in 2014 that the entire run of Video Hits no longer exists in their archives. Aside from a handful of short clips available online (usually transferred from home VHS recordings of the show), all episodes are lost. This is a highly unusual practice for the CBC, which unlike most networks almost never destroyed recordings dating back to its earliest years as a television network. Therefore, it is considered most likely that recordings of Video Hits episodes were destroyed for legal reasons, specifically, the requirements set by record labels when signing contracts with the CBC to license their music video catalogs.
