= Dan Gallagher =

Canadian television presenter (1957–2001)

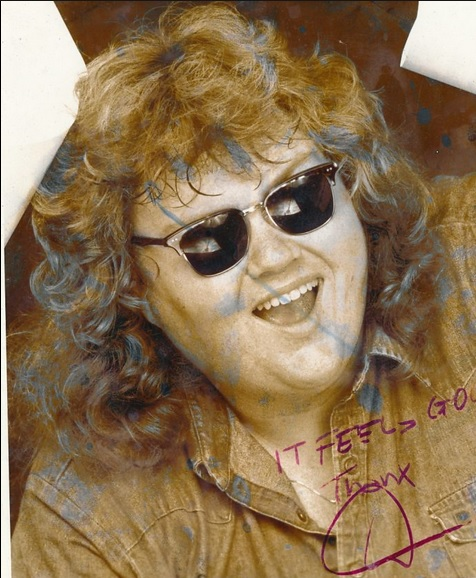
- Dan Gallagher fan promo photo
- Born: May 4, 1957; Don Mills, Ontario, Canada
- Died: January 20, 2001 (aged 43); Toronto, Ontario
- Occupations: Canadian broadcast and Media Personality

Dan Gallagher (May 14, 1957 – January 20, 2001) was a Canadian broadcaster, best known for hosting the game show Test Pattern on MuchMusic between 1989 and 1991. Also in the 1980s, he appeared on the Canadian music channel MuchMusic as a VJ and host of the Pepsi Power Hour. Gallagher later hosted the CBC Television music video program Video Hits from 1991 to 1993.

He later hosted beach volleyball game on TSN, and was a featured contributor for Hockey Night in Canada.

He also guest-starred on the Canadian comedy show The Kids in the Hall.

== Early life ==
Gallagher attended Senator O'Connor College School in Don Mills, where he was active with the school's counter-culture magazine, Gnork, then L'Amoreaux Collegiate Institute in Scarborough in the mid-1970s and founded an in-school radio station, "Radio L'Am" along with several other like-minded friends and which is still in operation as of 2024. He also was active in student council activities.

Gallagher was a DJ at the Bullring, a pub on the campus of the University of Guelph.

In 1989, Gallagher starred in the obscure low-budget horror anthology, Freakshow.

In 1991, Gallagher was the in-stadium host of Toronto Argonauts football games at the SkyDome; he worked with a sidekick named Luc Casimiri.

He hosted various weekend talk programs on CFRB in Toronto.

== Death ==
In January 2001, he was found dead in his home by his brother Brett Gallagher after a sudden illness. It was believed that Gallagher had contracted pneumonia during a trip to Barbados.
