= Cube (film series) =

Canadian science-fiction horror film series

- Directed by: Vincenzo Natali; Andrzej Sekuła; Ernie Barbarash; Yasuhiko Shimizu
- Written by: André Bijelic; Graeme Manson; Vincenzo Natali; Sean Hood; Ernie Barbarash; Koji Tokuo
- Distributed by: Cineplex Odeon Films & Trimark Pictures (1997); Lions Gate Films (2002, 2004); Shochiku (2021)
- Release dates: 1997 (Cube); 2002 (Cube 2: Hypercube); 2004 (Cube Zero); 2021 (Cube)
- Countries: Canada (1997–2004); Japan (2021)
- Languages: English (1997–2004); Japanese (2021)

Cube is a Canadian science-fiction horror film series. The films were directed by Vincenzo Natali, Andrzej Sekuła, Ernie Barbarash and Yasuhiko Shimizu, respectively.

The films are centered, with slight variations, on the same science-fictional setting: a gigantic, mechanized cubical structure of unknown purpose and origin, made up of numerous smaller cubical rooms, in which most or all of the principal characters inexplicably awaken in the opening scenes. Each of these rooms has six heavy vault doors, one on each face of the cube, which lead into adjacent, largely identical rooms, differing occasionally by colour of lighting. Some of these rooms are "safe", while others are equipped with deadly booby traps such as flamethrowers and razorwire. In some cases it is possible to detect a trap by throwing an object into the room first, although this method is not always reliable due to the trigger mechanism of certain traps.

In each case, a group of strangers awakens in this mysterious structure, without any knowledge of how or why they are there. In order to escape from the prison, they must band together and use their combined skills and talents to avoid the traps and navigate out of the maze, while also trying to solve the mystery of what the cube is and why they are in it.

== Films ==
=== Cube (1997) ===
Cube, the first film in the series, follows a group of seven frightened strangers who find themselves trapped in a mechanized maze of cubical rooms, with no memory of how they arrived there. Searching for a way out, they soon discover that many rooms contain lethal booby traps, while others are safe. Initially the prisoners band together in an attempt to escape, but one of the prisoners becomes increasingly unstable and threatens the group's escape. Despite production on a modest budget, the film grossed approximately $9 million worldwide and later developed a cult following, with critics praising its minimalist setting and tension.

=== Cube 2: Hypercube (2002) ===
Cube 2: Hypercube is a sequel to the film Cube. The dusky, dingy rooms of the first film are replaced with high-tech, brightly lit rooms, and the conventional technology of the original traps are replaced with threats based on abstract mathematics. A new group of prisoners quickly discovers that, unlike the original Cube, the rooms in their prison appear to shift instantaneously. They realize they are inside a hypercube in which gravity, space, and time are distorted. This time the prisoners each have a connection to the cube's suggested creator. Critical reception was mixed, with criticism for its CGI quality and writing, but praise for its acting and predecessor's characteristic suspense.

=== Cube Zero (2004) ===
Cube Zero is a prequel to the film Cube. Unlike the first two films, which were limited to the prisoners' point of view, the film concerns two characters, Eric Wynn and Dodd, who are technicians observing the prisoners. Wynn finds himself caring about the fate of Cassandra Rains, a woman in the Cube, and decides to risk his job and even his life to help her try to escape. The rooms are similar to the original film, except that the colors are not as bright as in the first film. Reviews for Cube Zero have been mostly positive.

=== Cube (2021) ===
A Japanese remake, also called Cube, was released in October 2021.

=== Future ===
In 2011, Lionsgate was reported to be taking pitches for a new film titled Cube 3D, though nothing came of the effort.

In April 2015, The Hollywood Reporter wrote that Lionsgate Films was planning to remake the film, under the title Cubed, with Saman Kesh directing, Roy Lee and Jon Spaihts producing and a screenplay by Philip Gawthorne, based on Kesh's original take. Development on the film stalled the following year, leaving its future uncertain.

== Cast and crew ==
=== Principal cast ===
Character	Original series		Prequel	Remake
Character	Cube	Cube 2: Hypercube	Cube Zero	Cube
Character	1997	2002	2004	2021
Kazan	Andrew Miller			Hikaru Tashiro (as Chio Uno)
Quentin McNeil	Maurice Dean Wint			Takumi Saito (as Hiroshi Ide)
Joan Leaven	Nicole de Boer			Anne Watanabe (as Asako Kai)
David Worth	David Hewlett			Masaki Suda (as Yuichi Goto)
Dr. Helen Holloway	Nicky Guadagni			Masaki Okada (as Shinji Ochi)
Rennes	Wayne Robson			Kōtarō Yoshida (as Kazumasa Ando)
Alderson	Julian Richings			Tokio Emoto (as First Man)
Kate Filmore		Kari Matchett		
Simon Grady		Geraint Wyn Davies		
Sasha / Alex Trusk		Grace Lynn Kung		
Jerry Whitehall		Neil Crone		
Max Riesler		Matthew Ferguson		
Colonel Thomas H. Maguire		Bruce Gray		
Mrs. Paley		Barbara Gordon		
The General		Philip Akin		
Julia Sewell		Lindsey Connell		
Becky Young		Greer Kent		
Dr. Phil Rosenzweig		Andrew Scorer		
Tracton		Paul Robbins		
Eric Wynn			Zachary Bennett	
Dodd			David Huband	
Cassandra Rains			Stephanie Moore	
Jax			Michael Riley	
Meyerhold			Mike "Nug" Nahrgang	
Jellico			Terri Hawkes	
Ryjkin			Jasmin Geljo	
Quigley			Diego Klattenhoff	
Robert P. Haskell			Martin Roach	
Bartok			Richard McMillan	
Owen			Tony Munch	
Finn			Joshua Peace	
Anna			Alexia Filippeos	
Male Doctor			Fernando Cursione	
Female Doctor			Araxi Arslanian	
Hiroto Goto				Soma Santoki

== Prisoners details in each film ==
=== Cube (1997) ===
Name	Occupation	Gender	Prison connection	Played by
Kazan	Unknown	Male	Kazan prison in Russia	Andrew Miller
David Worth	Architect	Male	Leavenworth Prison in the U.S.	David Hewlett
Quentin McNeil	Police officer	Male	San Quentin State Prison in the U.S.	Maurice Dean Wint
Joan Leaven	Mathematics student	Female	Leavenworth Prison in the U.S.	Nicole de Boer
Dr. Helen Holloway	Free clinic doctor	Female	Holloway Women's Prison in the UK	Nicky Guadagni
Rennes	Prison escapist	Male	Centre pénitentiaire de Rennes in France	Wayne Robson
Alderson	Unknown	Male	Alderson Federal Prison Camp in the U.S.	Julian Richings

=== Cube 2: Hypercube ===
Name	Occupation	Gender	Played by
Kate Filmore	Psychotherapist / Soldier	Female	Kari Matchett
Simon Grady	Private detective	Male	Geraint Wyn Davies
Alexandra "Sasha" Trusk	Computer hacker	Female	Grace Lynn Kung
Rebecca "Becky" Young	IZON technician	Female	Greer Kent
Julia Sewell	Attorney	Female	Lindsey Connell
Max Reisler	Computer game designer	Male	Matthew Ferguson
Mrs. Paley	Retired theoretical mathematician	Female	Barbara Gordon
Jerry Whitehall	Engineer	Male	Neil Crone
Colonel Thomas H. Maguire	Colonel	Male	Bruce Gray
Dr. Phil Rosenzweig	Scientist / Author / Nobel Prize nominee	Male	Andrew Scorer

=== Cube Zero ===
Name	Occupation	Gender	Played by
Eric Wynn	Junior cube technician	Male	Zachary Bennett
Dodd	Senior cube technician	Male	David Huband
Owen	Senior cube technician	Male	Tony Munch
Chickliss	Junior cube technician	Male	N/A
Cassandra Rains	Political protester	Female	Stephanie Moore
Jax	Senior cube supervisor	Male	Michael Riley
Robert P. Haskell	Cube soldier	Male	Martin Roach
Meyerhold	Unknown	Male	Mike "Nug" Nahrgang
Jellico	Unknown	Female	Terri Hawkes
Bartok	Unknown	Male	Richard McMillan
Ryjkin	Unknown	Male	Jasmin Geljo
Chandler	Unknown, possibly doctor	Female	Sandi Ross
Smith	Unknown	Male	Dino Bellisario
McCaw	Unknown	Female	Ashley James

=== Cube (2021) ===
Name	Occupation	Gender	Age	Played by
Yuichi Goto	Engineer	Male	29	Masaki Suda
Asako Kai	Staff employee	Female	37	Anne Watanabe
Shinji Ochi	Freeter	Male	31	Masaki Okada
Chio Uno	Middle school student	Male	13	Hikaru Tashiro
First Man	Prisoner	Male	Unknown	Tokio Emoto
Hiroshi Ide	Mechanic	Male	41	Takumi Saito
Kazumasa Ando	Company executive	Male	61	Kōtarō Yoshida

== See also ==
- Cinema of Canada
- The Cube (film)
