= Yutaka Nakano =

Japanese voice actor (born 1951)

- 仲野 裕
- Born: January 10, 1951 (age 75); Kanagawa Prefecture, Japan
- Occupations: Actor; voice actor
- Agent: Kakehi Production

Yutaka Nakano (仲野 裕, Nakano Yutaka; born January 10, 1951) is a Japanese actor and voice actor from Kanagawa Prefecture, Japan.

== Filmography ==
=== Television drama ===
- Kamen Rider Black RX (1989) – Doctor

=== Television animation ===
- Cowboy Bebop (1998) – Bob
- Ghost in the Shell: S.A.C. 2nd GIG (2002) – Ishikawa
- Eureka Seven (2005) – Yucatán Iglasias
- The Wings of Rean (2005) – Amalgam Rudol
- Black Butler (2008) – Henry Barrymore
- Kingdom (2012) – Changwenjun
- Saint Seiya Omega (2012) – Leo Mycenae
- Aikatsu! (2013) – Kurosaki
- Hunter × Hunter (Second Series) (2013) - Zeburo
- JoJo's Bizarre Adventure (2013) – Loggins
- Ace of Diamond (2014) – Hiroshige Kunitomo
- Tokyo Ghoul (2014) – Yukinori Shinohara
- Drifters (2016) – Tamon Yamaguchi
- Angolmois: Record of Mongol Invasion (2018) – Ōkura Yorisue
- The Rising of the Shield Hero (2019) – Aultcray Melromarc XXXII
- The Quintessential Quintuplets (2021) – The Nakano Quintuplets' Grandfather
- Dusk Beyond the End of the World (2025) – Urus

=== Original video animation (OVA) ===
- Legend of the Galactic Heroes (1994) – Jawaf
- ZOE: 2167 IDOLO (2001) – Lloyd
- Ghost in the Shell: Stand Alone Complex - Solid State Society (2006) – Ishikawa

=== Original net animation (ONA) ===
- Ghost in the Shell: SAC 2045 (2020) – Ishikawa

=== Theatrical animation ===
- Ghost in the Shell (1995) – Ishikawa
- Ghost in the Shell 2: Innocence (2004) – Ishikawa
- Naruto the Movie: Ninja Clash in the Land of Snow (2004) – Ken/Buriken
- The Princess and the Pilot (2011) – Domingo Garcia

=== Video games ===
- Ghost in the Shell: Stand Alone Complex (2004) – Ishikawa
- Shadow the Hedgehog (2005) – President
- Super Robot Wars UX (2013) – Amalgam Rudol
- Tales of Zestiria (2015) – Baltro

=== Dubbing roles ===
==== Live-action ====
- 12 Angry Men – Juror #1 (Courtney B. Vance)
- 12 Monkeys – Zoologist (Simon Jones)
- The 33 – André Sougarret (Gabriel Byrne)
- A.I. Artificial Intelligence – Professor Allen Hobby (William Hurt)
- Air Force One (2001 NTV edition) – Colonel Jack Carlton (Don McManus)
- Albino Alligator – G.D. Browning (Joe Mantegna)
- Amores perros – Daniel (Álvaro Guerrero)
- Annie: A Royal Adventure! – Lord Chamberlain
- Ant-Man – Howard Stark (John Slattery)
- Antiviral – Dr. Abendroth (Malcolm McDowell)
- August: Osage County – Beverly Weston (Sam Shepard)
- Awake – Dr. Larry Lupin (Christopher McDonald)
- Avengers: Endgame – Howard Stark (John Slattery)
- Ballistic: Ecks vs. Sever – Julio Martin (Miguel Sandoval)
- Batman v Superman: Dawn of Justice – Charlie Rose
- Big Daddy – Homeless Guy (Steve Buscemi)
- Blade – Gitano Dragonetti (Udo Kier)
- Blade II – Dieter Reinhardt (Ron Perlman)
- The Bridge – Lieutenant Hank Wade (Ted Levine)
- Bridge of Dragons – General Ruechang (Cary-Hiroyuki Tagawa)
- Casper – Paul "Dibs" Plutzker (Eric Idle)
- Celebrity – Tony Gardella (Joe Mantegna)
- Cellular – Jack Tanner (Noah Emmerich)
- Chain Reaction – Lucasz Screbneski (Krzysztof Pieczyński)
- Chicago Hope – Dr. Aaron Shutt (Adam Arkin)
- The Counterfeiters – Dr. Klinger (August Zirner)
- Crimson Peak – Carter Cushing (Jim Beaver)
- Crimson Tide (2000 TV Asashi edition) – Lieutenant Roy Zimmer (Matt Craven)
- Cube 2: Hypercube – Jerry Whitehall (Neil Crone)
- Cube Zero – Jax (Michael Riley)
- Devil's Due – Father Thomas (Sam Anderson)
- Diabolique – Guy Baran (Chazz Palminteri)
- Diagnosis: Murder – Lieutenant Detective Steve Sloan (Barry Van Dyke)
- Die Hard with a Vengeance – Bill Jarvis (Michael Cristofer)
- Drop Zone – Swoop (Kyle Secor)
- Dudley Do-Right – Kim J. Darling (Eric Idle)
- Dumb and Dumber – Joe "Mental" Mentalino (Mike Starr)
- End of Days – Carson (Robert Lesser), Cardinal
- The Exorcist: Believer – Tony (Norbert Leo Butz)
- Fair Game – Sam Plame (Sam Shepard)
- Fargo – Lou Solverson (Keith Carradine)
- Flags of Our Fathers – Technical Sergeant Keyes Beech (John Benjamin Hickey)
- Footloose – Rev. Shaw Moore (Dennis Quaid)
- Forrest Gump – Jenny's Father (Kevin Mangan)
- From Hell – Netley (Jason Flemyng)
- Genius – Philipp Lenard (Michael McElhatton)
- Ghost in the Shell – Ishikawa (Lasarus Ratuere)
- Ghostbusters: Afterlife – Ivo Shandor (J. K. Simmons)
- G.I. Joe: Retaliation – General Joseph Colton (Bruce Willis)
- The Godfather (2008 Blu-Ray edition) – Captain Mark McCluskey (Sterling Hayden), Emilio Barzini (Richard Conte)
- Gossip Girl – Howard "The Captain" Archibald (Sam Robards)
- Gotham – Detective Harvey Bullock (Donal Logue)
- Greenland – Dale (Scott Glenn)
- Guardians of the Galaxy – Garthan Saal (Peter Serafinowicz)
- Hail, Caesar! – Laurence Laurentz (Ralph Fiennes)
- Hereditary – Steve Graham (Gabriel Byrne)
- Hidden Figures – Al Harrison (Kevin Costner)
- Horrible Bosses – David Harken (Kevin Spacey)
- Horrible Bosses 2 – David Harken (Kevin Spacey)
- The Huntsman: Winter's War – King (Robert Portal)
- I Am Sam – Mr. Turner (Richard Schiff)
- In the Name of the King – Merick (John Rhys-Davies)
- Jack Ryan: Shadow Recruit – Rob Behringer (Colm Feore)
- John Q. – Dr. Raymond Turner (James Woods)
- The King's Man – Herbert Kitchener (Charles Dance)
- Kong: Skull Island – Senator Willis (Richard Jenkins)
- Licence to Kill – Felix Leiter (David Hedison)
- Limitless – Gennady (Andrew Howard)
- Loaded Weapon 1 – Mr. Jigsaw (Tim Curry)
- Looking for Richard – Richmond (Aidan Quinn)
- The Man Who Invented Christmas – William Hall (David McSavage)
- The Matrix Reloaded – The Keymaker (Randall Duk Kim)
- The Matrix Revolutions – Captain Roland (David Roberts)
- Max – Raymond "Ray" Wincott (Thomas Haden Church)
- Michael Collins – (Ned Broy (Stephen Rea))
- A Mighty Heart – Randall Bennett (Will Patton)
- Mindscape – Sebastian (Brian Cox)
- Minority Report – Eddie Solomon (Peter Stormare)
- Mission: Impossible – Ghost Protocol – Kurt Hendricks (Michael Nyqvist)
- Moonlight Mile – Ben Floss (Dustin Hoffman)
- Mr. Brooks – Mr. Earl Brooks (Kevin Costner)
- My Lovely Sam Soon – Lee Hyun-moo (Kwon Hae-hyo)
- Nash Bridges – Lieutenant A.J. Shimamura (Cary-Hiroyuki Tagawa)
- Nine Lives – Tom Brand (Kevin Spacey)
- Nothing to Lose – Charlie Dunt (Giancarlo Esposito)
- The Number 23 – Isaac French / Dr. Miles Phoenix (Danny Huston)
- Only God Forgives – Lt. Chang / "The Angel of Vengeance" (Vithaya Pansringarm)
- Outbreak – Major Casey Schuler (Kevin Spacey)
- Oz the Great and Powerful – Girl in Wheelchair's Father (Ralph Lister)
- Paycheck – Special Agent Dodge (Joe Morton)
- Pirates of the Caribbean: On Stranger Tides – Purser (Steve Evets)
- Platoon (2003 TV Tokyo edition) – Captain Harris (Dale Dye)
- Pressure – Engel (Danny Huston)
- The Pretender – Broots (Jon Gries)
- Proof of Life – Eric Kessler (Gottfried John)
- The Protector – Lee Hing (Peter Yang)
- The Quick and the Dead – Eugene Dred (Kevin Conway)
- Race – Jeremiah Mahoney (William Hurt)
- The Rock (2000 TV Asahi edition) – Captain Frye (Gregory Sporleder)
- Rumor Has It – Beau Burroughs (Kevin Costner)
- Sarah's Key – Bertrand Tezac (Frédéric Pierrot)
- Saw series – Mark Hoffman (Costas Mandylor)
- Scary Movie – Principal 'Squiggy' Squiggman (David Lander)
- Shallow Grave – Hugo (Keith Allen)
- The Shallows – Mr. Adams (Brett Cullen)
- She-Wolf of London – Griscombe (Anderson Knight)
- Sneaky Pete – Vince Lonigan (Bryan Cranston)
- Sniper – Chester van Damme (J. T. Walsh)
- Son of God – Pontius Pilate (Greg Hicks)
- Space Buddies – Pi (Bill Fagerbakke)
- The Sparks Brothers – Russell Mael
- Spotlight – Ben Bradlee, Jr. (John Slattery)
- Star Trek Into Darkness – Alexander Marcus (Peter Weller)
- Taken – Jean-Claude Pitrel (Olivier Rabourdin)
- The Terminator (1998 DVD edition) – Vukovich (Lance Henriksen)
- The Tourist – Chief Inspector Jones (Timothy Dalton)
- Training Day – Roger (Scott Glenn)
- Transformers: Dark of the Moon – Walter Cronkite
- Transformers: Age of Extinction – Harold Attinger (Kelsey Grammer)
- Twin Peaks (2017) – Deputy Chief Tommy "Hawk" Hill (Michael Horse)
- Unfaithful – Detective Dean (Željko Ivanek)
- United 93 – Captain Jason Dahl (J. J. Johnson)
- Universal Soldier: The Return – Dylan Cotner (Xander Berkeley)
- Unthinkable – Jack Saunders (Martin Donovan)
- Up Close & Personal – Bucky Terranova (Joe Mantegna)
- U.S. Marshals – Noah Newman (Tom Wood)
- USS Indianapolis: Men of Courage – Admiral William S. Parnell (James Remar)
- Veteran – Seo Do-cheol (Hwang Jung-min)
- The World's End – Guy Shepherd (Pierce Brosnan)

==== Animation ====
- The Adventures of Tintin: The Secret of the Unicorn – Allan
- Hilltop Hospital – Dr. Atticus
- Looney Tunes – Pepé Le Pew (Succeeding from Hidetoshi Nakamura)
- Incredibles 2 – Mayor
- Inside Out – Subconscious Guard Frank
- Puss in Boots – Bartender
- The Replacements – C.A.R.T.E.R.
- Planes: Fire & Rescue – Winnie
- Shrek Forever After – Gingy (Gingerbread Man)
- Soul – Jerry
- Star Wars: The Clone Wars – Faro Argyus
