= Elizabeth McGuire =

Elizabeth McGuire may refer to:

- The titular character of Lizzie McGuire
- Elizabeth McGuire, character in American Psycho 2
