= Stir of Echoes: The Homecoming =

2007 television film directed by Ernie Barbarash

- DVD cover
- Written by: Ernie Barbarash
- Directed by: Ernie Barbarash
- Starring: Rob Lowe; Marnie McPhail; Ben Lewis
- Music by: Norman Orenstein
- Country of origin: United States
- Original language: English

Production
- Producers: Philip Stilman; Claire Welland
- Cinematography: François Dagenais
- Editor: Mitch Lackie
- Running time: 89 minutes

Original release
- Network: Syfy
- Release: August 11, 2007

Stir of Echoes: The Homecoming is a 2007 American made-for-television supernatural horror film produced by Lions Gate Entertainment. The film premiered on the Sci Fi Channel. Originally titled The Dead Speak, it was written and directed by Ernie Barbarash and is a sequel to the 1999 feature film Stir of Echoes, although its only connection to the previous work is a similar premise and the inclusion of Jake Witzky, who had a key role in the original film but is only a secondary character here.

The film was released on DVD as Stir of Echoes 2.

== Plot ==
Ted Cogan is a United States National Guard captain commanding a National Guard unit in Iraq. When a van pulls into his checkpoint, he orders it to stop, to no avail. He orders his men to fire a warning shot, but they open fire on the van instead.

An Iraqi girl eventually comes out of the van, which catches fire. Ted later finds that they have killed an innocent family. Ted tries to save the girl, but the vehicle explodes and his unit is attacked, leaving him in a coma.

Two weeks later, Ted wakes up and returns home to his wife Molly and teenage son Max in Chicago. However, he is suffering from post-traumatic stress disorder complicated by the guilt he feels about the Iraqi family's deaths. Ted eventually starts having visions of a burned man who wants him to right a wrong.

As Ted begins to lose his grip on both his sanity and his family, he seeks medical support for his disorder, but his financial situation does not allow him to pay for a treatment, and the government denies him assistance. Ted enlists the aid of Jake Witzky, an equally unhinged psychic, to help him understand his dreams. Jake encourages Ted to figure out what the burned man wants.

Max's girlfriend Sammi and their friend Luke die in a car crash that injures Max. This leads to various messages from the spirit haunting Ted, which reveals itself as the spirit of Farzan, an Arab-American college student who was beaten up and then set on fire. Farzan wants Ted to find his killers.

Sammi and Luke were devastated and angry about the deaths of their fathers in Iraq. Max was angry about what happened to Ted in Iraq. That resulted in them becoming increasingly xenophobic. When they stumble upon Farzan and he asks them for a jack to fix a flat tire, the friends are hesitant to help. Farzan tries to defuse the tension by explaining that he is a local, born and raised in America. Sammi insults Farzan's bumper sticker that chides the fight for oil, and she drunkenly begins to hurl insults while commanding Max and Luke back to the car. As they prepare to leave without helping him, Farzan curses at Sammi, leading her to get out of the car and strike him with her whiskey bottle. The boys then jump in and also attack Farzan. Sammi suggests cutting his head off, similar to what her father endured. Max wishes to leave him, but Sammi pours her liquor over Farzan instead, asking for a lighter to set him on fire. The friends kill him and flee the scene.

As Ted and Molly grapple with what to do next, they argue about Max's future. Ted wants to go to the police, but Molly reminds him of the innocent people he killed as a soldier, leading to an impasse. Ted asks Farzan's spirit to reveal his wishes, and breaks down under the pressure of the vision. Molly races to get a doctor for Ted, but returns to find him possessed as the spirit and holding a loaded gun to Max's head. A nurse runs for help while Ted and Molly fight over the weapon. Ted, fighting the spirit's control, asks Molly to kill him and turns the gun on himself. In the struggle, Ted accidentally shoots Molly, who dies in his arms. Before dying, she begs Farzan's spirit not to harm her son.

At Molly's burial Ted explains to Max why it was necessary to turn him in for the murder, and asks Max to forgive him. The police then take Max to return him to jail before Farzan's spirit—now no longer burned—appears one last time to Ted, walks away and vanishes, seemingly moving on. Ted is locked up in a mental hospital where the ghost of Molly visits to ask if Farzan's spirit is now satisfied. Ted believes so, satisfying Molly who moves on after a final goodbye to him.

== Cast ==
- Rob Lowe as Ted Cogan
- Marnie McPhail as Molly Cogan
- Katya Gardner as April
- Zachary Bennett as Jake Witzky
- Ben Lewis as Max Cogan
- Tatiana Maslany as Sammi
- Shawn Roberts as Luke
- Vik Sahay as Farzan
- Colin Williams as Drexel
- PJ Lazic as Nunez
- Krista Sutton as Tessa
- Neil Crone as Gary
- Elias Zarou as Iraqi Officer
- Nicholas Carella as Kablinsky
- Cristine Prosperi as Iraqi Girl
- Jason Mercury as Translator
- Bill Lake as Colonel
- Shari Hollett as Army Doctor
- Greer Kent as Administrator
- Mike 'Nug' Nahrgang as Security Guard
- Eugene Clark as Older Vet
- Lucy Filippone as Latina Woman
- Mikayla Serena Alpas as Carlita "Little Carlita"
- Jasmin Geljo as Maintenance Man
- George Buza as Albino Man
- Grace Lynn Kung as Friendly Nurse
- Kim Roberts as Head Nurse
- Anne Tager Page as Alice "Old Lady Alice"

== Production ==
The film was shot in Stouffville and Toronto, both in Ontario, Canada. It was released on DVD on November 20, 2007.

== Reception ==
Reviews for the film were predominantly negative, with Bloody Disgusting's Ryan Daley writing that "It goes without saying that any Stir of Echoes sequel made without [original director] [David] Koepp’s involvement is sure to turn out to be a real hack job, and this shoe definitely fits Homecoming." Horror.com also panned the film, citing the film's repetition and lack of suspense as some of the reasons the film disappointed. Jeff Allard of Shock Till You Drop criticized the film, stating "this 'sequel' fails to show the same instincts for the genre, leaving it as just an echo of its far more accomplished predecessor."

== See also ==
- List of ghost films
