= Yee Jee Tso =

Canadian actor (born 1975)

- Born: March 10, 1975 (age 50); British Hong Kong
- Occupation: Actor
- Notable work: Doctor Who TV movie

Yee Jee Tso (born March 10, 1975, in Hong Kong) is a Canadian actor.

Tso and his family emigrated to Canada when he was six months old. He grew up in a predominantly Jewish neighbourhood and booked his first role at age 15.

His television roles include The Commish, Highlander, Sliders (1995), and the 1996 Doctor Who telemovie, in which he played the character Chang Lee. His Doctor Who connection continued when he played the part of Doctor Goddard in the webcast Real Time produced by Big Finish Productions, the part of Major Jal Brant in the audio drama Excelis Decays in 2002 and the role of Warrant Officer Charlie Sato in 2011's Tales from the Vault, 2013's Mastermind and 2014's The Screaming Skull.

Roles include Jared Chan, a programming wizard opposite Natasha Henstridge in the sci-fi thriller TV movie Impact, released worldwide in spring 2009. In 2007 he played the part of child-devouring monster in the other-worldly horror film They Wait, featured at the Toronto Film Festival.

He has played recurring roles on both sides of the law, in three award-winning television series Da Vinci's Inquest, Da Vinci's City Hall, and Intelligence.

In 2001, he played Teddy Chin, a counter-culture computer genius, opposite Ryan Phillippe in the MGM feature film AntiTrust. His other credits include: a series regular on the award-winning Canadian show Madison; recurring roles in the hit sci-fi TV series Stargate: Atlantis and Sliders; and guest appearances in dozens of other films and TV shows. In 2009 he appeared in Ratko: The Dictator's Son as Nick.

In 2020, he appeared at the BritCon British-themed convention in Bellevue, Washington, because of his role in the 1996 Doctor Who film, along with other actors from the Doctor Who film and series.

== Credits ==
=== Filmography ===
Year	Title	Role	Notes
1995	Highlander: The Series	Gerald	Episode: Leader of the Pack
1996	Doctor Who	Chang Lee	TV Movie
1997	The Outer Limits	Hong	Episode: Dead Man's Switch
1998	Honey, I Shrunk the Kids: The TV Show	Ork-Slayer	Episode: Honey, It's No Fun Being an Illegal Alien
1999	The Net	Matt	Episode: Eye-see-you.com
2001	Stargate SG-1	Left Tech	Episode: Absolute Power
2002	It's a Very Merry Muppet Christmas Movie	Angel 1	TV Movie
2005	Battlestar Galactica	Staffer	Episode: Final Cut
2007	Psych	Perry	Episode: Meat Is Murder, But Murder Is Also Murder
2007	Stargate: Atlantis	Systems Tech/Technician	2 episodes
2014	Arrow	Scientist	Episode: The Climb

=== Audio dramas ===
Year	Title	Role
2002	Doctor Who: Excelis Decays	Major Jal Brant
2002	Doctor Who: Real Time	Doctor Goddard
2011	Doctor Who: Tales from the Vault	Warrant Officer Charlie Sato
2013	Doctor Who: Mastermind	Charlie Sato
2014	The Worlds of Doctor Who	Charlie Sato
2018	Doctor Who: The Turn of the Screw	Narrator
