= Adriana Maggs =

Canadian actress, writer and director

- Occupations: Screenwriter, Director, Producer
- Writing career
- Years active: 2004-present
- Notable works: Grown Up Movie Star; Goalie

Adriana Maggs is a Canadian film and television director, writer, and producer. She is best known for writing and directing the award winning films, Goalie, starring Mark O'Brien, and Grown Up Movie Star, starring Tatiana Maslany, which was nominated for the World Cinema Grand Jury Prize: Dramatic at the Sundance Film Festival.

Maggs co-directed Hey Lady! alongside Sarah Polley, which premiered at the Sundance Film Festival, and directed season two of the popular web series How to Buy a Baby. She has worked as both a writer and producer on Law & Order Toronto: Criminal Intent, Pretty Hard Cases, and Coroner, for which she was nominated in Best Writing, Drama Series at the 2023 Canadian Screen Awards, among others.

In 2021, she won the Canadian Screen Award for Best Direction, Web Program or Series for Hey Lady!, and was a nominee in the same category the previous year for How to Buy a Baby. She was a Genie Award nominee for Best Screenplay at the 31st Genie Awards in 2011 for Grown Up Movie Star, and was a co-winner of the Gemini Award for Best Ensemble Performance in a Comedy Program or Series at the 24th Gemini Awards in 2009 for Three Chords from the Truth.

== Awards ==
Work	Award	Category	Result	Year	Ref.
I Dare Not Go	Atlantic Film Festival; Atlantic Canadian Award	Outstanding Writers Award	Winner	2003	
Skin Cream for Mermaid Leg Scars	Arts and Letters Awards Program	Senior Division Short Fiction	Winner	2004	
Three Chords From The Truth	Gemini Awards	Best Ensemble Performance in a Comedy Program or Series	Winner	2009	
Three Chords From The Truth	Gemini Awards	Best Comedy Series	Nominee	2009	
Grown Up Movie Star	Bird's Eye Film Festival	Best Debut Feature	Winner	2010	
Grown Up Movie Star	Sundance Film Festival	Grand Jury Prize - World Cinema, Dramatic	Nominee	2010	
Grown Up Movie Star	Sundance Film Festival	Special Jury Prize - Breakout Performance for Tatiana Maslany, World Cinema Dramatic	Winner	2010	
Grown Up Movie Star	Genie Awards	Best Screenplay, Original	Nominee	2011	
Grown Up Movie Star	Writer's Guild of Canada; WGC Screenwriting Award	Best Writing in a Feature Film	Nominee	2011	
How To Buy A Baby	New Media Film Festival	Festival Award	Nominee	2020	
How To Buy A Baby	Canadian Screen Award	Best Direction, Web Program or Series	Nominee	2020	
Goalie	Writer's Guild of Canada; WGC Award	Feature Film	Nominee	2020	
Hey Lady!	Director's Guild of Canada	Outstanding Directorial Achievement - Comedy Series	Nominee	2020	
Hey Lady!	Canadian Screen Award	Best Direction, Web Program or Series	Winner	2021	
Coroner	Canadian Screen Awards	Best Writing, Drama Series	Nominee	2023	

== See also ==
- List of female film and television directors
- List of LGBT-related films directed by women
