= Christmas Inheritance =

- Film poster
- Directed by: Ernie Barbarash
- Written by: Dinah Eng
- Produced by: David Anselmo
- Starring: Eliza Taylor; Jake Lacy; Andie MacDowell; Michael Xavier; Neil Crone
- Cinematography: Peter Benison
- Edited by: Gordon McClellan
- Music by: Terry Frewer
- Production company: MPCA
- Distributed by: Netflix
- Release date: December 15, 2017
- Running time: 104 minutes
- Country: Canada
- Language: English

Christmas Inheritance is a 2017 Canadian Christmas comedy-drama film directed by Ernie Barbarash and written by Dinah Eng. The film stars Eliza Taylor, Jake Lacy and Andie MacDowell.

The film features Ellen as a spoiled New York City heiress sent to a small New England town with limited resources to test if she's ready to take over her father's company. When circumstances strand her, her experiences with the townspeople gives her a new perspective on life and her privilege, while also leading to romance with the local inn manager.

The film was released on Netflix on December 15, 2017.

== Plot ==
Manhattan business executive Jim Langford wants to retire but fears his daughter Ellen is ill-prepared to take over as CEO. He and his former business partner Zeke yearly exchange Christmas letters in-person in Snow Falls, their New England hometown where their business started.

As a test, Ellen is sent to Snow Falls to hand-deliver this year's letter to "Uncle Zeke" within a box containing them all. Hoping she learn something from the small town lifestyle and wanting her to rely on herself rather than the family wealth and influential name, Jim gives Ellen $100 in cash, instructing her to travel incognito.

In Snow Falls, Ellen befriends Jake, manager of the Snow Falls Guest House inn. Told Zeke has just left for his cabin, Ellen books a room to await him and dines with Jake at his Aunt Debbie's local diner.

With no word from Zeke the next day, Ellen's fiancé Gray tells her to leave the letters and return. Ellen refuses, wanting to fulfill her father's request. Without money to stay another night, she works as a housekeeper for Jake.

When she fails, Ellen pretends to be a baker. Sent to help in Debbie's diner, she is recognized as Langford's daughter. After Ellen explains why she is there incognito, Debbie promises to tell no one and teaches her to bake.

A snowstorm causes road closures and power outages in Snow Falls. Jake shelters many at the inn, so an inspired Ellen offers shelter to homeless Baxter, someone she ignored earlier, then offers her bed to a woman with two children.

Ellen discovers Jake is an artist while helping clean the inn. He explains he lived in NYC and was engaged to a stockbroker who left him for a client, so he returned to Snow Falls. "Silent Night" was playing when she broke up with him, so Jake is triggered by it.

Ellen explains she became a shallow and self-focused teenager upon her mother's death, living for sheer enjoyment. She remarks Jake is teaching her other things are important. They nearly kiss but Ellen stops. Jake later apologizes, saying he has not felt he could trust anyone new like her for ages.

The next day Ellen convinces local businesses to donate items for the charity auction Jake is running. Gray arrives to take Ellen on their Christmas vacation. When she tells him about discusses her experiences in town, he says she does not belong here. Still unable to find Zeke, Ellen reads the letters in the box and is touched. Running into Jake at a bar, Gray reveals Ellen's identity, making him feel betrayed.

The next day, Gray pressures Ellen to leave, so she relents. She asks Jake to give the box of letters to Zeke, but he refuses. Revealing he knows her identity, he remarks she is another dishonest person from NYC. After Ellen leaves, Jake listens to "Silent Night."

On the drive back to NYC, Ellen realizes she left her father's most recent letter at the inn so wants to go back. Gray refuses, dismissing the letters and her father's Christmas tradition as stupid. He then suggests Jake will give the letter back as he knows how important her family is.

Realizing Gray is who revealed her identity to Jake, Ellen chews him out, insisting traveling incognito was necessary for her to learn from the people of Snow Falls. When he says nothing can be learned from "hicks," she gives back her engagement ring and returns to Snow Falls via bus.

At the community Christmas Eve celebration, Ellen finds Jake and apologizes, explaining she has left Gray and has a better perspective on life due to him and everyone in Snow Falls. Dressed as Santa, Zeke reads Jim's letter to everyone in the crowd. It explains Jim sent his daughter incognito to learn the value of tradition, friendship, and love, as she will now be the new CEO.

Zeke was aware of the plan and deliberately kept his distance so Ellen could see the town for herself without anyone's influence. Jim appears as well, to congratulate Ellen on her new position and perspective.

Jim reunites with Debbie, his high school girlfriend. She then sings "Silent Night" as Jake asks Ellen to dance.

== Cast ==
- Eliza Taylor as Ellen Langford
- Jake Lacy as Jake Collins
- Andie MacDowell as Debbie Collins
- Michael Xavier as Gray Pittman
- Neil Crone as Jim Langford
- Anthony Sherwood as Uncle Zeke Langford/Santa
- Bill Lake as Captain Williams
- Martin Roach as Sheriff Paul Greenleaf
- Joanna Douglas as Cara Chandler
- Mikayla Radan as Olivia "Livvy" Chandtler
- Lori Hallier as Alice
- Mag Ruffman as Kathy Martin
- Lindsay Leese as Mrs. Worthington
- Telysa Chandler as Annabelle
- John Tench as Baxter

== Production ==
The film began shooting in North Bay, Ontario on March 24, 2017, and wrapped principal production there on April 8, 2017.

Toronto based makeup artist Alessondra Bastianoni worked as key makeup artist with fellow makeup artist Kim Bean as her first assistant.

== Reception ==
On review aggregator website Rotten Tomatoes, the film holds an approval rating of 50% based on 6 reviews, and an average rating of 6.2/10.

== See also ==
- List of Christmas films
