= They Wait =

2007 film by Ernie Barbarash

- Official film poster
- Directed by: Ernie Barbarash
- Written by: Trevor Markwart (story); Trevor Markwart; Carl Bessai; Doug Taylor
- Produced by: Diane Boehme; Uwe Boll; Stephen Hegyes; Andrew Koster; Jonathan Shore; Shawn Williamson
- Starring: Terry Chen; Jaime King; Regan Oey; Cheng Pei-pei; Henry O Colin Foo; Michael Biehn; Yee Jee Tso
- Cinematography: Gregory Middleton
- Edited by: Lisa Robison
- Music by: Hal Beckett
- Production companies: CHUM Motion Pictures; Brightlight Pictures
- Distributed by: TVA Films
- Release date: 2007
- Running time: 89 minutes
- Country: Canada
- Language: English

They Wait is a 2007 Canadian horror film directed by Ernie Barbarash. It stars Jaime King as a mother attempting to find the truth and save her son when threatened by spirits during the Chinese tradition of Ghost Month. The other leading star is Chinese Canadian actor Terry Chen, who plays her husband. It was both filmed, and set, in the city of Vancouver, in British Columbia in Canada, and was featured at the 2007 Toronto International Film Festival.

== Plot ==
Married couple Sarah (King) and Jason (Chen), and son Sammy (Oey), travel to Vancouver for the funeral of Uncle Raymond (Foo). During this time, Sammy begins to see ghosts and falls gravely ill, his illness coinciding with the Chinese festival of Ghost Month. After traditional western medicine fails to help Sammy, Sarah turns to a mysterious pharmacist who tells her that her son is held in a death grip by a living corpse. Sarah now must find what the spirits want before the last day of Ghost Month, or Sammy will be lost forever.

== Cast ==
- Terry Chen as Jason
- Jaime King as Sarah
- Regan Oey as Sammy
- Cheng Pei-pei as Aunt Mei
- Henry O as Pharmacist
- Colin Foo as Raymond
- Chang Tseng as Xiang
- Vicky Huang as Shen
- Michael Biehn as Blake
- Donald Fong as Ben
- Wally Houn as Pang
- Stephen M.D. Chang as Funeral Director
- Donny Lucas as Sam's Doctor
- Suzanne Bastien as Nurse #1
- Erika Conway as Nurse #2
- Grace Fatkin as Receptionist
- Joseph May as Paramedic
- Yee Jee Tso as Pharmacy Store Clerk
- Paul Wu as Young Raymond
- Maggie Ma as Young Mei
- Nelson Wong as Young Ben
- Vincent Tong as Young Xiang
- Igor Ingelsman as Worker

== Production ==
They Wait was filmed on location in Vancouver in March 2007. The cities involved in filming were Gastown, Vancouver and Victoria, all are situated in British Columbia, Canada.

== Reception ==
On Rotten Tomatoes, the film holds an approval rating of 40% based on 5 reviews, with a weighted average rating of 5.8/10. Joe Leydon of Variety wrote that "Director Ernie Barbarash makes judicious use of CGI trickery -- in one key scene, he cleverly shocks his audience into laughing -- but at heart, he's an old-school traditionalist when it comes to scary stuff." The Toronto Star and ReelFilm both panned the film, with ReelFilm's David Nusair saying that They Wait is "...a tedious and downright silly piece of work."
