= Cube (2021 film) =

Film by Yasuhiko Shimizu

- Theatrical release poster
- Japanese: CUBE 一度入ったら、最後
- Directed by: Yasuhiko Shimizu
- Screenplay by: Koji Tokuo
- Based on: Cube by Vincenzo Natali
- Produced by: Akiko Funatso; Satoko Ishida
- Starring: Masaki Suda; Anne Watanabe; Masaki Okada; Hikaru Tashiro; Takumi Saito; Kōtarō Yoshida
- Cinematography: Tomoyuki Kawakami; Toyomichi Kurita
- Edited by: Tsuyoshi Imai
- Music by: Yutaka Yamada
- Distributed by: Shochiku
- Release date: October 22, 2021 (Japan)
- Running time: 108 minutes
- Country: Japan
- Language: Japanese

Cube (Note: stylized in all caps; Japanese title: CUBE 一度入ったら、最後, lit. 'CUBE: Once You Enter, It's Over') is a 2021 Japanese science fiction horror film written by Koji Tokuo and directed by Yasuhiko Shimizu. It is a remake of the 1997 Canadian film of the same name and the fourth film in the Cube film series. The film stars Masaki Suda, Anne Watanabe, Masaki Okada, Hikaru Tashiro, Takumi Saito, and Kōtarō Yoshida. It was released in Japan on October 22, 2021.

== Plot ==
A man awakens in a cube-shaped room, each wall of which is a hatch connecting to adjacent rooms. Upon entering another room, razor-sharp beams suddenly extend from the walls, killing him.

Engineer Yuichi Goto wakes up in a similar room alongside middle school student Chiharu Uno and freeter Shinji Ochi. They are all wearing identical jumpsuits, with their possessions gone and no memory of how they got there. A fourth, mechanic Hiroshi Ide, who has been navigating the maze, enters and warns them that some rooms are booby-trapped. Mathematics teacher Asako Kai also joins the group. When Ide opens a hatch in the ceiling, the corpse of the man from the first scene drops in. Deciding to work together to find an exit, the group begins traversing the rooms, with Ide using a boot as a decoy to test for traps. They encounter corporate executive Kazumasa Ando, who joins them.

The group enters a room where their only option is to go through the door. When Goto freezes midway through in fear, Ide pushes him aside and opens the door for the others. Uno has memorized the numbers between the rooms he passed through and uses a button to scratch them onto a panel. Goto theorizes that the rooms with thresholds including prime numbers contain traps, and he and Uno work together to calculate which rooms are safe to enter.

The group enters a room where all exits appear to be trapped. Ide discovers that one room's trap is sound-activated, and they carefully pass through it in silence. However, Ochi accidentally causes a noise, triggering the trap and injuring Ando's leg. Ando becomes enraged at Ochi. They grow confused when a room without prime numbers is still trapped and they return to the room with the corpse, leading them to suspect that the rooms themselves are moving.

A tremor causes Uno to fall into a room with a laser trap. Goto and Ide attempt to rescue him and succeed, but Ide is killed in the attempt. With Kai's assistance, Goto realizes that the numbers on the plates correspond to Cartesian coordinates which can be used to locate the exit. Metal bars extend from the floor, separating Ochi and Ando from the others. Ando decides that he and Ochi will find the exit on their own and part ways with the others. Goto, Kai, and Uno reach a room with a screen that displays Goto's memories of his younger brother Hiroto, who committed suicide to escape their abusive father. Distressed, Goto is consoled by Uno and becomes determined to protect the others. Meanwhile, Ando continues to bully Ochi, culminating in Ochi killing Ando by repeatedly slamming his head in a hatch door.

Uno calls Goto a coward for not saving his brother and threatens to jump in an unchecked room. Spurred on by his memories of failing to save Hiroto, Goto catches Uno at the last moment and sees that, like Hiroto, Uno's arms bear bruises from physical abuse. Kai tells them they have reached the edge of the cube, and they open the door to find their cube is part of an enormous structure, and they are over 50 meters up on its side; far from the distant opposite side with what seems like an exit. Ochi rejoins the group, claiming that Ando died in a trap. Suspicious, Uno confronts Ochi, who then attacks him. The others save Uno, and Ochi admits to killing Ando and deliberately leading them into a trapped room. As the trap activates, Goto fights off Ochi, who is killed by the trap. Goto sacrifices his chance to escape to ensure that Uno and Kai reach a room moving toward the exit. Uno and Kai reach the edge of the cube. Kai insists on staying behind to search for more survivors, and Uno exits the cube through a passageway leading to a light. Wounded, Goto continues to navigate the cube, determined to find a way out. It is revealed that Kai is cybernetically monitoring the survivors as part of an experiment and re-enters the cube to begin the process anew with a different group.

== Cast ==
- Masaki Suda as Yuichi Goto, a 29-year-old engineer. He is based on David Worth from the original film.
- Anne Watanabe as Asako Kai. Purportedly a 34-year-old mathematics teacher, the film's ending suggests she is a cyborg or android and part of the organization responsible for the cube. She is based on Joan Leaven from the original film.
- Masaki Okada as Shinji Ochi, a 31-year-old freeter. He is based on Quentin McNeil from the original film.
- Hikaru Tashiro as Chiharu Uno, a 13-year-old middle school student and mental calculator. He is based on Kazan from the original film.
- Tokio Emoto as First Man, an unnamed prisoner. He is based on Alderson from the original film.
- Takumi Saito as Hiroshi Ide, a 41-year-old mechanic who is desperate to escape the cube and reunite with his wife. He is based on Rennes from the original film.
- Kōtarō Yoshida as Kazumasa Ando, a 61-year-old corporate executive. He is based on Dr. Helen Holloway from the original film.
- Soma Santoki as Hiroto Goto, Yuichi's younger brother and an original character to this film.

== Production ==
=== Filming ===
Filming took place in October and November 2020.

== Reception ==
=== Critical response ===
The film has received mixed-to-negative reviews from critics. James Marsh, writing for the South China Morning Post, gave the film 2 out of 5 stars, and summarized: "The movie is so repetitive and sluggish, and the characters so insufferable, that being stuck in the deadly cube might seem preferable to watching it." In the Kinejun Review on Kinenote, run by Kinema Junpo Publishing, Junichi Inoue gave the film a low rating, saying, "Did anyone involved in this film think this was interesting? Did no one say anything? I question their love of film." Shigeki Koga commented, "The classicism and social aspects make this film mediocre. As a result, all the characters are stereotyped and lack depth." Writer Kaori Hattori said, "There are still some unresolved aspects to the characters, young and old, male and female, and the more you try to delve deeper into their inner thoughts and backgrounds, the more frustrating it becomes as the story deviates from realism."
