= Mother Up! =

2010s American-Canadian animated TV series

- Genre: Comedy; Adult animation
- Created by: Marnie Nir; Katherine Torpey
- Directed by: Steven Evangelatos
- Starring: Eva Longoria; Jesse Camacho; Gabrielle Miller; Rebecca Husain; Scott McCord
- Opening theme: "Mother Up!", performed by Lee Anna James
- Composer: Richard Pell
- Countries of origin: Canada; United States
- Original language: English
- No. of seasons: 1
- No. of episodes: 13

Production
- Executive producers: Eva Longoria; Jacquie Barnbrook; Bradley Bernstein; Delna Bhesania
- Producers: Greg Lawrence; Audrey Velichka
- Running time: 22 minutes
- Production companies: Breakthrough Entertainment; Mass Animation; Bardel Entertainment; Rogers Media

Original release
- Network: Hulu; City
- Release: November 6, 2013 – February 26, 2014

Mother Up! is an adult animated sitcom web series created by Marnie Nir and Katherine Torpey, which premiered on Hulu in the United States on November 6, 2013. The series also began airing on City in Canada on January 23, 2014. It was developed by Rogers Media and is a co-production between Canadian companies Breakthrough Entertainment and Bardel Entertainment, and American-based Mass Animation. A total of 13 episodes were produced.

The show marked Hulu's second foray into animated programming after The Awesomes. It was pitched as "Family Guy for women".

The Mother Up! theme song, is written and performed by Lee Anna James in the Hulu release, but on the Canadian version, it was written by Warren Bray & Odario Williams of Grand Analog and Maiko Watson, formerly of Sugar Jones.

== Plot ==
"Mother Up!" chronicles the misguided attempts at parenthood of a disgraced music executive who transitions from the big city to suburbia. After she resigns from her job and her husband leaves her, Rudi Wilson becomes a single mother raising her two children, Dick and Apple, and must learn mothering duties. Executive producer Eva Longoria also stars as Rudi.

== Characters ==
=== Wilson family ===
- Rudi Wilson (voiced by Eva Longoria) - The main character, a former music executive whose reputation is almost ruined after a scandal involving shooting kids in Central America with her client, 2Bit. She preserves her reputation by transferring all of the blame to her boss, at the price of her job and her life in the city. Now, she must live as a single suburban mother (her husband left her with two kids), despite being a terrible one.
- Dick Wilson (voiced by Jesse Camacho) - Rudi's son, a loner whose only friend is Agnes Chu. He constantly gets bullied by Travis. In episode 1, Rudi throws him a 10th birthday party, although Sarah says Dick and Apple's birthdays aren't for months, so Dick is probably 9 years old during the first season.
- Apple Wilson (voiced by Rebecca Husain) - Rudi's imaginative daughter, who longs for her mother's attention. In episode 4, Rudi says Apple is 6, while in episode 6 she says she is 5.
- Jeffrey Wilson (voiced by Mark McKinney) - Rudi's former husband, the father of Dick and Apple.

=== Chu family ===
- Mrs. Suzi Chu (voiced by Grace Lynn Kung) - One of the series' other antagonists; Jenny's friend. She drives her daughter Agnes to excessive studying.
- Agnes Chu (voiced by Rebecca Husain) - A girl in Dick's grade, but she's in the gifted class. She attends sports camp every summer as her parents want her to be well-rounded. In episode 6, her mother says she is the youngest female Chess Master in the world (though Apple, enhanced by drugs, checkmates her) and Rudi estimates that Agnes is 10 years old.

=== Neighbours ===
- Sarah (voiced by Gabrielle Miller) - Rudi's best friend, a married mother of one. Sarah is very impressed by Rudi's high-powered lifestyle and celebrity friends, and is easily convinced to "pick up the slack" in Rudi's parenting. Rudi plainly takes advantage of Sarah's good nature, but she takes the abuse like a trooper in the name of friendship and for the good of Apple and Dick. In her heart, she admires Rudi's life and attitude.
- Fergus (voiced by Rebecca Husain) - Sarah's autistic son (she calls him "Fergie"); Apple's best friend.
- Greg (voiced by Scott McCord) - Rudi's friend and other neighbor, a widower and father of one. Greg sees himself as a helper and potential suitor to Rudi, though she walks all over him. However, his eternal optimism fuels their friendship. He likes to do odd jobs for her and the community; it also implied Greg is scared of his stepson Joel.
- Joel (voiced by Zachary Bennett) - Greg's stepson. He hates adults, especially his stepdad Greg, perhaps because he misses his real dad. His mother died, so Greg inherited custody of him. Joel is a misanthropic goth/emo with extremely violent anti-social tendencies, in sharp contrast to his easygoing, gregarious stepfather. He plays violent video games - only banned ones - while wearing diapers so he can play for long periods of time.

=== Faculty ===
- Principal Moxley (voiced by Helen Taylor) - Head of staff at the kids' school. In Episode 6, she threatens to call Child Protective Services because Rudi let Apple walk across the tightrope on school grounds, but backs down after Rudi says she will tell the police, the media, and the school's insurance company about the tightrope.
- Nurse Higgins (voiced by Rebecca Husain) - The school's nurse and head of the drama department. She enjoys explaining diagnoses and stories in a theatrical manner, with costumes.
- Miss Belfonte (voiced by Gabrielle Miller) - Apple's teacher.
- Ernesto - The school janitor; Miss Belfonte often hits on him.

=== Others ===
- Jenny (voiced by Helen Taylor) - Rudi's enemy and one of the series' antagonists. She disapproves of Rudi's parenting, and is resentful that Rudi is the only person who ever stood up to her. Her child attends the same school as Dick and Apple.
- Travis (voiced by Scott McCord) - Son of one of Jenny's friends; a school bully who beats up Dick.
- 2Bit (voiced by Clé Bennett) - A rapper; Rudi's former client, he constantly needs Rudi's help when he needs inspiration or if he's too full of himself, so he visits her often. To sign him with Mass Exploitation Records, Rudi went child-hunting with him, which is why she had to move to the suburbs.

== Episodes ==
No.	Title	American release date	Canadian release date
1	"Pilot"	November 6, 2013	January 23, 2014
Rudi and her artist 2Bit are caught in a scandal involving shooting kids in Central America; so the media won't label her a monster, she diverts all the criticism to her employer. She is successful - at the cost of her job, career, and husband. She must move to the Canadian suburbs, where she soon realizes she's a terrible mother. She meets fellow mom Sarah and stepdad/terrible life coach Greg. She's embarrassed when Apple won't swim because of a story Rudi told her about a kid who falls into a crocodile-infested river, and when Dick has an allergic reaction to peanuts from peanut bars she gave him, and the moms tease her about it. She gets depressed and she's about to sell the kids on eBay when an optimistic Sarah puts the situation in a different perspective, as a chance to one-up the other moms. Rudi throws Dick a birthday party hoping to increase her status; when Jenny, top rival-mom of Sarah and Rudi, tries to sabotage the party, 2Bit appears and performs a song. Rudi is successful and gains her children's love.
2	"Shoe I Am"	November 6, 2013	January 30, 2014
After men start looking at Jenny instead of Rudi, she fears she's losing her swagger, and the cure is her shoes, which results in attention from the other moms. A jealous Jenny convinces a lonely Dick to contribute to the charity auction at school. When he asks an oblivious Rudi if he can donate something to the auction, she lets him, but he auctions her irreplaceable shoes. While she stresses over them. Sarah is desperate to please her husband, while 2Bit is trying to write a new song after failing to triumph at a recent award show. Rudi, Sarah, and 2Bit discover that Rudi's shoes are now owned by (gasp!) poor people! She can't stand this, and the trio embarks on an adventure to retrieve every single shoe. Soon she finds a person who has an unnatural interest in shoes and makes a deal with him. Meanwhile, she makes Apple and Dick believe a witch is in the hallway, and they seek help from Greg, who also believes in the witch.
3	"Double D Moms"	November 13, 2013	February 6, 2014
Rudi becomes so lazy that she relies on Sarah to look after Dick and Apple as well as her own son, Fergus. Sarah admits that she wishes she could be as loose as Rudi, who promptly makes Sarah her new project, encouraging her to take some 'me' time. When Sarah suggests going to a book club, Rudi suggests something more extreme and they join a drunk mom on her binge, and Dick's teacher joins in for their absurd hijinks. They soon get caught by the cops, but get a free pass by befriending them. But Sarah takes things too far and calls Rudi a lightweight, and when Fergus wakes up in a pile of sausages and can't find his mother, he approaches Rudi. She finds Sarah at the bottom of a Siberian sausage shop, drunk and covered in snake venom, thinking that a bottle of gin is Fergus. She snaps out of her trance, but must fight a world-class snake-venom fighter. Meanwhile, when Travis bullies Dick about his father leaving, he searches for a substitute dad and hangs out with a prison convict.
4	"The Comforting Hum of a Mother's Love"	November 20, 2013	February 13, 2014
After Rudi accidentally leaves the kids at school, Apple develops an unnatural bond with the school vending machine and is secretive to Rudi about what she does at recess. When Rudi finally finds out, she steals the machine with Greg's help, after telling him she wants to get rid of it because it causes obesity. She puts it in Apple's bed at night, and Apple thinks "Machine Mommy" has come to live with her. But she soon gets too clingy to "Machine Mommy" and Rudi becomes jealous after seeing Greg with Joel and Sarah with Fergus. When Rudi and Greg put squirrels in the vending machine, Apple thinks "Machine Mommy" is telling her to eat healthier. As a last resort, Rudi pretends to be "Machine Mommy" and tells her she's not cool. Apple goes running back to Rudi, and they destroy the vending machine together. Meanwhile, a friendless tries to look up "making friends" on the Internet and buys a monkey friend who gets too clingy and wants to kill everybody Dick likes.
5	"Everybody Sees 2Bit's Wang"	December 4, 2013	February 20, 2014
Rudi's credit card is declined when she exceeds her limit trying to buy the kids the latest shoes, and the other moms taunt her for being poor, and she discovers that her royalty checks have decreased. Then a naked 2Bit comes to stay with her for a "spiritual journey"; when she demands rent from him, he says he can't because he got rid of his money as part of the "spiritual journey." Rudi thinks of selling her blood to buy the kids the newest fads, but the blood bank won't let her, so she heads to a drug-testing facility and takes a drug dose which inflicts temporary blindness, swelled tongue, rapid hair growth, etc. Meanwhile, the kids face constant discrimination for not having the latest fads because Rudi gets them a day too late, and Dick overhears that 2Bit's spiritual advisor is a scam artist.
6	"Apple Gets the Pirate Disease"	December 11, 2013	February 27, 2014
Apple gets scurvy because Rudi doesn't feed her suitable foods, so Rudi gives her drugs so she'll like fruits and vegetables. An exceptionally smart girl named Agnes Chu wins many awards, so gives Apple many drugs, to the point where Apple becomes addicted to them, though Rudi refuses to admit it because of all the awards they help her win. Apple soon becomes hostile and addicted to winning. Meanwhile, Dick does a report on a chicken, which turns into a report on animal rights when the chicken becomes anthropomorphic after being exposed to Apple's drugs.
7	"Say Hello to My Landscaper Friend"	January 15, 2014	March 8, 2014
After Rudi is pressured by the other neighborhood mothers to clean her yard, she hires an undocumented worker named Salvador who does such a great job that she no longer needs Greg to fix things. Greg becomes jealous and pretends to be an undocumented worker. Rudi hires him but prefers Salvador, so she hires Greg as entertainment. Fed up with Salvador, Greg calls Customs & Immigration on Salvador, so Rudi decides to marry Salvador as a green card marriage. Greg gets mistaken for the undocumented worker, while Salvador wants some love in their marriage. Meanwhile, Dick starts a lemonade stand.
8	"Overnight Delight"	January 22, 2014	March 15, 2014
Dick thinks he needs to be "the man" of the house because his dad is gone, so Greg suggests that Dick and Joel have a sleepover. Meanwhile, the neighborhood is mad at Rudi since she never throws sleepovers and they threaten to disinvite Apple from their sleepovers. Rudi decides to throw a sleepover but can't tell the difference between a sleepover and a "girls' night in."
9	"Mr. Right in the Eye"	January 29, 2014	March 22, 2014
To avoid concerns that she’s on the prowl, Rudi invents a fake boyfriend. 2Bit provides Rudi with the newest in erotic technology, a sexbot that turns out to be too much for her. Meanwhile, sparks fly between Dick and his new tutor, Agnes Chu.
10	"Apple's Story"	February 5, 2014	March 29, 2014
Depressed because her teacher doesn't like her project, Apple suddenly assumes that she's not good at anything. Rudi decides to help her out, and after Apple writes a really good play, Rudi convinces the principal to use it and make Rudi the director.
11	"Invasion of the Hipsters"	February 12, 2014	April 5, 2014
During her attempt to quit smoking, Rudi invites a group of NYC hipsters to her house to "immerse" themselves in suburbia – while she immerses herself in their second-hand smoke; Dick takes care of a very sickly citizen.
12	"The Prophet Apple"	February 17, 2014	April 12, 2014
Struck by lightning, Apple becomes a miracle child complete with healing powers and followers, which Rudi embraces for all its perks. When Apple's faithful become overwhelming, Rudi must find a way to disperse them.
13	"Rudi Gets Served"	February 26, 2014	April 19, 2014
When her ex Jeffrey arrives with divorce papers, Rudi discovers that he's trying to marry an elderly heiress - who not only wants Rudi's husband, but her kids as well. The battle is on.

== Telecast and home media ==
Mother Up! premiered on Hulu on November 6, 2013. New episodes would be released on Wednesdays.

Mother Up! had its Canadian television debut on City on January 23, 2014, with new episodes aired on Saturday nights (during its first few weeks it was Thursday nights).

The series became available on Breakthrough Entertainment (now Shadow Pine Studios)'s YouTube channel in mid-2020.
