= Hey Lady! =

Canadian comedy web series

- Promotional image featuring Jayne Eastwood as Lady
- Genre: Comedy
- Created by: Morris Panych
- Written by: Morris Panych
- Directed by: Sarah Polley; Adriana Maggs; Will Bowes
- Starring: Jayne Eastwood; Jackie Richardson
- Country of origin: Canada
- No. of seasons: 1
- No. of episodes: 8

Production
- Executive producers: Morris Panych; Sarah Polley; Tara Ellis; John Buchan
- Producer: Jessica Jennings
- Editor: David Wharnsby
- Camera setup: Single-camera
- Running time: 41 minutes (total)

Original release
- Release: February 14, 2020

Hey Lady! is a Canadian comedy web series that is directed by Adriana Maggs, Will Bowes and Sarah Polley, and airs on CBC Gem. The series was created by playwright Morris Panych for Jayne Eastwood and is Eastwood's first leading role in her 50-year-long career. Eastwood portrays Lady, a wild and foul-mouthed woman in her 70s who is constantly getting into trouble with her friend Rosie (Jackie Richardson).

The series premiered at the 2020 Sundance Film Festival and was well received by critics, who described it as a senior citizen's spin on Fleabag. Critics noted the talented cast, which includes Christine Horne as Lady's daughter Lassie, Zachary Bennett as her son Rover, Grace Lynn Kung as her daughter-in-law Molly, Raoul Bhaneja as her parole officer, and Don McKellar as her psychiatrist.

The series received five Canadian Screen Award nominations and four Directors Guild of Canada Awards nominations.

== Plot ==
Lady is a septuagenarian who constantly acts out and creates chaos, and is often accompanied by her friend Rosie. When Lady is ignored in a park, she puts lipstick on a baby and is subsequently placed under house arrest. She protests this by having a plumber reverse the faucets in her son Rover's house and sets dogs loose to experience freedom. Lady insists a low-budget series about her, with which she is not very impressed, is being filmed; whenever Lady is distressed or bored, she orders the series to move to the next scene. She is forced to see psychiatrist Dr. Wolfe and ignores his advice to stick with something to see where it goes.

Lady and Rosie cause a disturbance at a country club, and leave Lady's daughter Lassie to settle the bill. After numerous other incidents, two police calls and an intervention by her children, Lady appears in court. Prosecutor Lassie recommends jail but Lady is sentenced to community service. Undaunted, Lady sends snakes to her parole officer while Lassie prepares to move Lady into a seniors home.

Lady poses as a real estate agent and tries to sell Rover's house. Wolfe becomes unsettled and Lady tells him he loses his mind in the last episode. While playing bridge with three elderly women in a sitting room, Lady becomes bored and cuts to a strip club with Rosie, where they launch into another prank. Wolfe is increasingly troubled, especially when Lady orders a cut to another scene and disappears from his office. In an ill-maintained park for old people, Lady sits on a bench proclaiming her importance and insisting the camera continues filming while a public address system is heard advising residents of a meeting to register for aquafit classes.

== Cast ==
=== Main cast ===
- Jayne Eastwood as Lady
- Jackie Richardson as Rosie

=== Supporting cast ===
- Don McKellar as psychiatrist Dr. Wolfe
- Zachary Bennett as Rover, Lady's son
- Grace Lynn Kung as Molly, Rover's wife
- Christine Horne as Lassie, Lady's daughter
- Scott Thompson as The Judge
- Peter Keleghan as Golf Course Manager and Gallery Owner
- Matt Watts as Sparky, Lady's son
- Sergio Di Zio as Waiter / Purse Snatcher
- Raoul Bhaneja as Parole Officer

== Production ==
Playwright Morris Panych wrote Hey Lady! specifically for Eastwood, who initially rejected the script and stopped reading at the scene in which Lady disrobes and sexually propositions a plumber. Eastwood, who is a founding member of the sketch troupe Women Fully Clothed, has a noted disdain for the oversexualization of older women for comedic effect, believing it has been overdone. Director Sarah Polley, who worked with her on Slings & Arrows, persuaded Eastwood Lady is rebelling in the scene and that there is more to the character. Eastwood subsequently embraced the screenplay and called it "a miracle script for [her]". She found stepping into the role, which is a comically exaggerated version of herself, easy. Lady is Eastwood's first leading role in a five-decade-long acting career.

Episodes were directed by Polley, Will Bowes and Adriana Maggs. The show was produced by Jessica Jennings of TJ Content with executive producers Panych, Polley, John Buchan and Tara Ellis. The series was filmed by Iris Ng and edited by David Wharnsby with production design by Ciara Vernon. Filming was done in July 2019, with one day of filming in Cobourg and the rest in Toronto, Ontario. Sound was edited and mixed by Sim Post Toronto. Each of the eight episodes are about five minutes long, with a total running time of 41 minutes.

== Release ==
Hey Lady! had its world premiere at the Sundance Film Festival on 28 January 2020, as part of the Indie Episodic Showcase. It was chosen from over 10,000 works submitted to the festival.

The series had its streaming premiere on CBC Gem on 14 February 2020. According to data from the Canadian Broadcasting Corporation, Hey Lady! was among the six most-watched comedy programmes on CBC Gem from March to August 2020.

== Reception ==
=== Critical response ===
Critical response to Hey Lady! was generally positive. John Doyle of The Globe and Mail praised the series as "a journey from zany to lawless comedy raucousness", "the most extraordinary creation on Canadian TV", and perhaps the funniest show ever produced by the CBC. Following his initial review, Doyle recommended it as one of three short-form streaming shows to binge-watch and included Eastman's portrayal of Lady as one of eight great performances on Canadian television in 2020.

Several critics favourably equated Eastman's Lady to a septuagenarian version of Fleabag's title character. Debra Yeo of the Toronto Star noted the series for its standout cast. TV critic Bill Brioux wrote the "edgy and hilarious" series measures up to its "deep bench of talent" and called Eastwood "Canada's secret weapon of comedy". Writing for Now, Radheyan Simonpillai described the series as a showcase for the cast's comedic talents but found the breaking of the fourth wall – while initially hysterical due to its flawless, in-character execution – to be overly repetitive in the short format.

Amelia Gaudreau of Le Devoir noted the creativity of the directors and said the series is more than an "old bitch comedy" as Lady cheerfully tramples over the fourth wall to control the narrative of her story. Ben Travers of IndieWire recommended the series to international distributors, describing it as "a meta lark" and "entertaining throughout", and hoped a potential second season could give Lady more of a backstory.

=== Nominations and awards ===
Hey Lady! was nominated for five Canadian Screen Awards and four Directors Guild of Canada Awards. Eastwood was nominated for Outstanding Performance – Female by ACTRA Toronto. In March 2020, Polley was named ACTRA's Woman of the Year for her artistic and advocacy work.

Year	Ceremony	Category	Nominee or recipient	Result	Ref
2020	19th Directors Guild of Canada Awards	Outstanding Directorial Achievement in Comedy Series	Adriana Maggs, Sarah Polley & Will Bowes	Nominated	
2020	19th Directors Guild of Canada Awards	Best Production Design – Comedy or Family Series	Ciara Vernon	Nominated	
2020	19th Directors Guild of Canada Awards	Best Picture Editing – Comedy or Family Series	David Wharnsby	Nominated	
2020	19th Directors Guild of Canada Awards	Best Sound Editing – Comedy or Family Series	David Caporale, David McCallum, Krystin Hunter	Nominated	
2021	19th ACTRA Awards in Toronto	Outstanding Performance – Female	Jayne Eastwood	Nominated	
2021	9th Canadian Screen Awards	Best Web Program or Series, Fiction, Independent Production Fund	Tara Ellis, John Buchan, Sarah Polley, Morris Panych	Nominated	
2021	9th Canadian Screen Awards	Best Direction, Web Program or Series	Episode 3 – Adriana Maggs, Sarah Polley, Will Bowes	Won	
2021	9th Canadian Screen Awards	Best Writing, Web Program or Series	Episode 3 – Morris Panych	Nominated	
2021	9th Canadian Screen Awards	Best Lead Performance, Web Program or Series	Jayne Eastwood	Won	
2021	9th Canadian Screen Awards	Best Supporting Performance, Web Program or Series	Jackie Richardson	Nominated	
