= Barbara Gordon (actress) =

Canadian actress

Barbara Gordon is a Canadian film, television and stage actress. She is most noted as a two-time Genie Award nominee for Best Supporting Actress, receiving nods at the 1st Genie Awards in 1980 for Wild Horse Hank and at the 7th Genie Awards in 1986 for Overnight.

She won a Dora Mavor Moore Award in 2000 for Best Actress, Independent Theatre, for her performance as Weasy in Factory Theatre's production of Chaz Thorne's The Dogpatch.

== Filmography ==
=== Film ===
| Year | Title | Role | Notes |
|---|---|---|---|
| 1974 | Christina | Mrs. Brice | |
| 1979 | Plague | Joan Fuller | |
| 1980 | Wild Horse Hank | Marlene Conners | |
| 1980 | Coming Out Alive | Helen | |
| 1981 | Threshold | Wanda | |
| 1982 | If You Could See What I Hear | Molly | |
| 1982 | Trapped | Miriam Chatwill | |
| 1986 | Overnight | Alison | |
| 1987 | Night Friend | Mrs. Duncan | |
| 1988 | Dead Ringers | Danuta / clinic receptionist | |
| 1990 | Beautiful Dreamers | Agatha Haines | |
| 1990 | White Room | Mrs. Gentle | |
| 1999 | Resurrection | Judge Seers | |
| 1999 | Three to Tango | Jenny Novak | |
| 2002 | Men with Brooms | Eva Foley | |
| 2002 | Cube 2: Hypercube | Mrs. Paley | |
| 2002 | Three and a Half | Mika, Cruella, Landlord's Wife | |
| 2004 | Gone Dark | Julie | |
| 2005 | Neil | Kate | |
| 2006 | Skinwalkers | Nana | |
| 2007 | Still Small Voices | Silva Waiverly | |
| 2008 | Hooked on Speedman | Judge | |
| 2011 | Unlucky | Gladys | |
| 2012 | Still Mine | Margaret Jones | |
| 2013 | Home Sweet Home | Sara's Mother | |
| 2013 | Separation | Mom | |
| 2013 | Empire of Dirt | Mrs. Armstrong | |
| 2015 | Life | Grandma Dean | |
| 2019 | The Silence | Woman with Shotgun | |
| 2019 | Buffaloed | Mrs. Cooney | |
| 2019 | Business Ethics | Mrs. Finnigan | |
| 2020 | Learning to Love Again | Mary | |

=== Television ===
| Year | Title | Role | Notes |
|---|---|---|---|
| 1979 | The Great Detective | Esther | Episode: "The Curious Death of a Maiden Lady" |
| 1980 | Matt and Jenny | Ruth Crawford | Episode: "Wolf Howl at Kennebec Cliff" |
| 1981 | Hangin' In | Mrs. Boychuck | Episode: "Mothers and Dyads" |
| 1981 | For the Record | Liz Carfield | Episode: "The Running Man" |
| 1981 | Escape from Iran: The Canadian Caper | Kathryn 'Katie' Koob | Television film |
| 1982 | A Far Cry from Home | Lawyer | Television film |
| 1982, 1983 | The Littlest Hobo | Peg / Mary Pearce | 2 episodes |
| 1984 | Islands | Elaine | Television film |
| 1984 | Kate Morris Vice President | Stella | Television film |
| 1985 | Letting Go | Mrs. Rudnick | Television film |
| 1985 | The Edison Twins | Jackie | Episode: "Robbers and Robots" |
| 1986 | Mafia Princess | Acting Coach | Television film |
| 1987 | The Kidnapping of Baby John Doe | Mrs. Tingley | Television film |
| 1987 | Night Heat | Linda | Episode: "Mean Business" |
| 1987 | A Conspiracy of Love | Dr. Celia Hanson | Television film |
| 1987 | Check It Out! | Ms. Schultz | Episode: "Edna's Choice" |
| 1988 | Adderly | Amb. Stanton | Episode: "Covert Agenda" |
| 1989 | Lady in the Corner | Miriam | Television film |
| 1990 | War of the Worlds | Bebe Gardner | Episode: "Path of Lies" |
| 1990 | Friday the 13th: The Series | Nurse Morgan | Episode: "The Tree of Life" |
| 1990 | Road to Avonlea | Mrs. Ray | 3 episodes |
| 1992 | Quiet Killer | Calvin's Wife | Television film |
| 1992 | The Women of Windsor | Downing | Television film |
| 1992 | The Good Fight | Dinah | Television film |
| 1992–1993 | Street Legal | Dr. Grace Kerr | 4 episodes |
| 1993 | Night Owl | Station Manager | Television film |
| 1993 | Shattered Trust: The Shari Karney Story | Talk Show Host | Television film |
| 1994 | Trial at Fortitude Bay | Josephine Kant | Television film |
| 1995 | Picture Perfect | Grandma Matilda | Television film |
| 1995 | Kung Fu: The Legend Continues | Carrie Winslow | Episode: "The Promise" |
| 1996 | Lives of Girls & Women | Aunt Elspeth | Television film |
| 1996 | Remembrance | Dorothea Kerr | Television film |
| 1996 | Undue Influence | Custody Judge | Television film |
| 1996 | What Kind of Mother Are You? | Paula Fowler | Television film |
| 1997 | Borrowed Hearts | Bridget | Television film |
| 1998 | The Fixer | Dede Scharber | Television film |
| 1998 | Universal Soldier II: Brothers in Arms | Danielle Devreaux | Television film |
| 1998 | Universal Soldier III: Unfinished Business | Danielle Devreaux | Television film |
| 1998 | Animorphs | Fran | Episode: "The Forgotten" |
| 1998 | At the End of the Day: The Sue Rodriguez Story | Dr. Jackman | Television film |
| 1998–1999 | Traders | Miriam Baker | 3 episodes |
| 1999 | The Promise | Principal | Television film |
| 1999 | In the Company of Spies | Senator Rone | Television film |
| 2000 | The Last Debate | Lorraine Hampstead | Television film |
| 2000 | Children of My Heart | Miss Watson | Television film |
| 2001 | Queer as Folk | Senator Diane Baxter | Episode: "Solution (How TLFKAM Got Her Name Back)" |
| 2001 | The Judge | Jamie | Episode: "Part One" |
| 2001 | Snap Decision | Moderator | Television film |
| 2003 | Behind the Camera: The Unauthorized Story of Three's Company | Audra Lindley | Television film |
| 2003 | 1-800-Missing | Elizabeth Larkin | Episode: "Thin Air" |
| 2003 | Sex and the Single Mom | Valerie | Television film |
| 2003 | The Elizabeth Smart Story | Jenny Francom | Television film |
| 2004 | Redemption: The Stan Tookie Williams Story | Mrs. Morgan | Television film |
| 2004 | Prom Queen: The Marc Hall Story | Connie Jukes | Television film |
| 2004–2005 | This Is Wonderland | Marilyn Germaine | 3 episodes |
| 2005 | More Sex & the Single Mom | Valerie | Television film |
| 2006 | Love Thy Neighbor | Micky Gallaghan | Television film |
| 2006 | The Road to Christmas | Rheudel Pullman | Television film |
| 2007 | Love You to Death | Gweb | Television film |
| 2007 | Air Crash Investigation | Betty Tootell | Episode: "Falling from the Sky" |
| 2007 | Criminal Minds | Dog Owner | Episode: "Scared to Death" |
| 2007 | Life with Derek | Aunt Madge | Episode: "A Very Derekus Christmas" |
| 2008 | Girl's Best Friend | Mom | Television film |
| 2008 | XIII: The Conspiracy | Martha Miller | 2 episodes |
| 2009 | Too Late to Say Goodbye | Lily Ann Holmes | Television film |
| 2009–2011 | Little Mosque on the Prairie | Mrs. Hobbs | 12 episodes |
| 2011 | King | Sandra Holloway | Episode: "Ahmad Khan" |
| 2011 | Christmas Magic | Betsy | Television film |
| 2012 | Todd and the Book of Pure Evil | Older Older Martha-Ruth | Episode: "Deathday Cake" |
| 2012 | The L.A. Complex | Eleanor | Episode: "Stay" |
| 2013 | Christmas with Tucker | Cora McCray | Television film |
| 2014 | The Best Laid Plans | Muriel Parkinson | 6 episodes |
| 2018 | Sleeper | Barbara | Television film |
| 2019 | Private Eyes | Betty Love | Episode: "The Conroy Curse" |
| 2019 | Murdoch Mysteries | Alberta Bennett | Episode: "Murdoch and the Cursed Caves" |
| 2019 | Nostalgic Christmas | Dorothy Wentzell | Television film |
| 2020 | The Boys | Judy Atkinson | Episode: "We Gotta Go Now" |
| 2021 | The Perfect Wedding | Nancy | Television film |
