= Ernie Barbarash =

Film director and producer

- Born: 31 August 1968 (age 57); Odesa, Ukraine
- Occupations: Film director, film producer, screenwriter

Ernie Barbarash is a film director, screenwriter and producer, perhaps best known as co-producer of the films American Psycho 2, Cube 2: Hypercube, Prisoner of Love, The First 9½ Weeks and The Cat's Meow. Barbarash also wrote and directed Cube Zero and Stir of Echoes: The Homecoming. He also directed the Canadian horror thriller They Wait.

== Filmography ==
=== Director ===
- Cube Zero (2004)
- Stir of Echoes: The Homecoming (2007)
- They Wait (2007)
- Hardwired (2009)
- Rock the House (2010)
- Ticking Clock (2011)
- Assassination Games (2011)
- Six Bullets (2012)
- Second Chances (2013)
- Reading Writing & Romance (2013)
- Falcon Rising (2014)
- Pound of Flesh (2015)
- The Saint (2017)
- A Royal Winter (2017)
- Christmas Inheritance (2017)
- Abduction (2019)
- Holiday in the Wild (2019)
- Christmas in Rome (2019)
- Too Close for Christmas (2020)
- The Great Christmas Switch (2021)
- Heatwave (2022)
- I'm Glad It's Christmas (2022)
- The Jingle Bell Jubilee (2023)
- Christmas Under the Northern Lights (2024)
- Grounded in Love (2025)

=== Producer ===
- The Incredible Adventures of Marco Polo on His Journeys to the Ends of the Earth (1998) (co-producer)
- The First 9 1/2 Weeks (1998) (co-producer)
- Prisoner of Love (1999) (producer)
- American Psycho (2000) (co-producer)
- The Cat's Meow (2001) (co-producer)
- American Psycho II: All American Girl (2002) (producer)
- Cube 2: Hypercube (2002) (producer)
- Cube Zero (2004) (executive producer)

=== Writer ===
- Cube 2: Hypercube (2002) (screenplay)
- Cube Zero (2004) (written by)
- Stir of Echoes: The Homecoming (2007) (written by)
