= Stephanie Moore =

Canadian actress

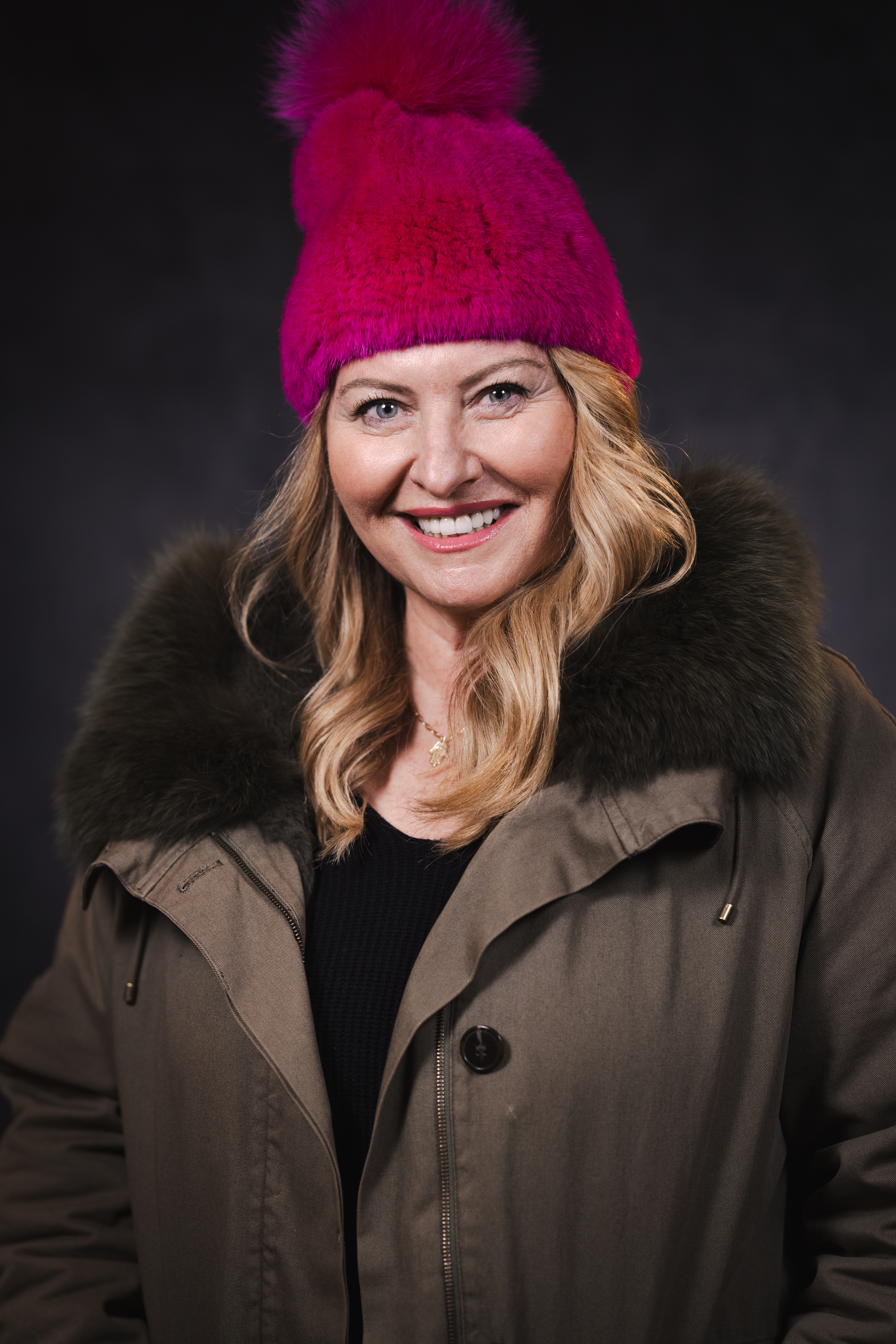
- Moore in 2025
- Born: Stephanie Moore; July 14, 1970 (age 56); Ottawa, Ontario, Canada
- Occupation: Actress
- Years active: 1999–present
- Spouse: Glenn Cockburn (m. 2003)

Stephanie Moore (born July 14, 1970) is a Canadian actress. She is best known for her roles on Queer as Folk as Cynthia, and in the Degrassi franchise as Diana Hollingsworth. She has worked extensively in theatre, and some of her film roles include Cube Zero, Angel Eyes, John Q, and Priscilla.

== Early life ==
She was born in Ottawa, Ontario. Moore studied drama at Canterbury High School, Ottawa.

== Filmography ==
=== Film ===
Year	Title	Role	Notes
2000	Urban Legends: Final Cut	Girl in 16mm Film	
2001	Angel Eyes	Officer Vanessa	
2002	John Q.	Admitting Nurse	
2004	Cube Zero	Cassandra Rains	
2007	King of Sorrow	Julia Baker	
2007	P2	Lorraine	Voice
2018	Giant Little Ones	Angie Kohl	
2023	Priscilla	Dee	

=== Television ===
Year	Title	Role	Notes
1986	Highschool Confidential	Cynthia	
1989	Denim Blues	Sandy	
1999	A Touch of Hope	Carla Munson	Television film
1999–2005	Queer as Folk	Cynthia	25 episodes
2001	Hangman	Lynn Farmer	Television film
2001	Zebra Lounge	Marissa Wallace	Television film
2002	Blue Murder	Wendy Simpson	Episode: "Payback"
2002	Sue Thomas: F.B.Eye	Young Mrs. Thomas	Episode: "Pilot"
2003	Bugs	Manning	Television film
2004	Missing	Mrs. Marilyn Bailey	Episode: "Domestic Bliss"
2004	Kevin Hill	Ashley Mayer	Episode: "Going for the Juggler"
2006	The Path to 9/11	Deanna Burnett	2 episodes
2006	Angela's Eyes	Claudia Potts	Episode: "In Your Eyes"
2006–2009	G-Spot	Livia Moore	12 episodes
2007	The Dresden Files	Felicity Jones	Episode: "The Other Dick"
2008, 2010	The Latest Buzz	Mrs. Pierce	2 episodes
2012	Nikita	Elaine Abbott	Episode: "Innocence"
2013	An Amish Murder	Reporter	Television film
2013	Alien Mysteries	Denise Lynch Murter	Episode: "Bucks County"
2013	Warehouse 13	Mrs. Labelle	Episode: "What Matters Most"
2014–2015	Degrassi: The Next Generation	Mrs. Hollingsworth	10 episodes
2015	Degrassi: Don't Look Back	Mrs. Hollingsworth	Television film
2015	Heroes Reborn	Tomboy's Mom	Episode: "Brave New World"
2016	Murdoch Mysteries	Mrs. Blackwood	Episode: "Once Upon a Murdoch Christmas"
2016	Incorporated	New Diana	Episode: "Cost Containment"
2016–2017	Degrassi: Next Class	Diana Hollingsworth	12 episodes
2017	Odd Squad	Dry Cleaner Lady	Episode: "Rookie Night/Who Let the Doug Out?"
2018	Good Witch	Geena	Episode: "Family Time"
2019	A Storybook Christmas	Hanna Duvall	Television film
2019	Impulse	Karen Dale	3 episodes
2022	A Tail of Love	Rachel Montgomery	Television film
2024	A Bluegrass Christmas	Sarah Pendleton	Television film

== Awards and nominations ==
In 1990 Moore won a best actress ACTRA Award for her role of Sandy, a troubled student, in the television school drama Denim Blues.
