= Kōtarō Yoshida (actor) =

Japanese actor and theatre director (born 1959)

- 吉田 鋼太郎
- Born: January 14, 1959 (age 67); Tokyo, Japan
- Occupations: Actor, theatre director
- Agents: Performance Unit AUN; Horipro
- Website: aun.la.coocan.jp

Kōtarō Yoshida (吉田 鋼太郎, Yoshida Kōtarō; born January 14, 1959, in Tokyo) is a Japanese actor and theatre director. He established himself on the stage in classical theatre, becoming a regular in Yukio Ninagawa's Shakespeare productions and co-founding the theatre company Performance Unit AUN in 1997. Television roles in Hanzawa Naoki (2013) and Hanako to Anne (2014) brought him wider recognition and led to frequent film and television work. In 2016 he succeeded Ninagawa as the second artistic director of the Sai no Kuni Shakespeare Series. He is affiliated with Horipro.

== Biography ==
Yoshida spent six years in Osaka during his grade school days, and later grew up in Hino, Tokyo. While a student at St. Paul High School, he saw the Shakespearean comedy "Twelfth Night" by the Kumo Theater Company and decided to become an actor. While studying at the Department of German Literature in the Faculty of Literature at Sophia University, he made his debut by performing Twelfth Night in the Shakespeare Study Group. He later dropped out of the university.

After working with the Shiki Theatre Company for six months, he worked with Shakespeare Theatre, Lyming Theatre Company, and Tokyo Ichigumi before forming Performance Unit AUN with director Yoshihiro Kurita in 1997, which he also directed. He was valued as an actor capable of performing the roles required of foreign classics such as Shakespeare and Greek tragedies, and was a regular in Yukio Ninagawa's productions. His roles for Ninagawa included Titus in a Japanese-language production of Titus Andronicus that played the Royal Shakespeare Theatre in 2006. He is a close friend of Tatsuya Fujiwara and Shun Oguri, who often appeared in Ninagawa's works. Starting in 2010, he expanded his activities into television dramas and films on the advice of Oguri.

Yoshida played Hanzawa's boss in Hanzawa Naoki in 2013 and Densuke Kanō, who was modeled after businessman Den'emon Itō, in Hanako to Anne in 2014. These performances attracted attention, which led to an increase in his appearances in films, his first starring role being in Tokyo Sentimental.

He married on January 1, 2016, a woman 22 years his junior, and held a wedding ceremony in February 2017. In October 2016, he succeeded Yukio Ninagawa as the second artistic director of the Sai no Kuni Shakespeare Series.

== Filmography ==
=== Stage ===
Year	Title	Role	Director	Notes	Ref.
1985	Twelfth Night		Harumi Nakashima		
1997	Othello	Othello	Yukio Ninagawa		
1998	The Merchant of Venice	Shylock	Norio Deguchi		
2001	Hamlet	Hamlet	Norio Deguchi		
2006	Titus Andronicus	Titus	Yukio Ninagawa	Royal Shakespeare Theatre	
2008	King Lear	Earl of Gloucester	Yukio Ninagawa		
2014	Julius Caesar	Cassius	Yukio Ninagawa		
2015	Death Note: The Musical	Ryuk	Tamiya Kuriyama		

=== Film ===
Year	Title	Role	Notes	Ref.
2010	Surely Someday	Kitō		
2015	Assassination Classroom	Kensaku Ōno		
2015	Shinjuku Swan	Amano		
2017	To Each His Own	Mamoru Yamagami		
2017	Teiichi: Battle of Supreme High	Jōsuke Akaba		
2017	The Third Murder	Daisuke Settsu		
2017	Mixed Doubles	Seiichirō Yamashita		
2017	Shinjuku Swan II	Amano		
2018	The Lies She Loved			
2018	Love × Doc			
2018	Over Drive	Issei Tsuzuki		
2019	Doraemon: Nobita's Chronicle of the Moon Exploration	Diabolo (voice)		
2019	Ossan's Love the Movie	Musashi Kurosawa		
2019	Brave Father Online: Our Story of Final Fantasy XIV	Akio's father	Lead role	
2019	Dragon Quest: Your Story	Ladja (voice)		
2019	Lupin III: The First	Lambert (voice)		
2019	Shinkansen Henkei Robo Shinkalion the Movie: Mirai Kara Kita Shinsoku no ALFA-X	Ohanefu (voice)		
2020	Kaiji: Final Game	Yoshihiro Kurosaki		
2020	From Today, It's My Turn!!	Ichirō Mitsuhashi		
2021	Cube	Kazumasa Ando		
2021	Last of the Wolves	Yōzō Watafune		
2022	The Way of the Househusband	Kondō		
2023	Yudō	Critic		
2023	We're Millennials. Got a Problem?: The Movie	Iwao Aso		
2024	Love You as the World Ends: The Final	Saijō		
2024	Hey Handsome!!	Gentaro Ito	Lead role	
2024	Maru	Akimoto		
2024	Oshi no Ko: The Final Act	Ichigo Saitō		
2025	Showtime 7	Shōji		
2025	Stigmatized Properties 2	Kioshi Fujiyoshi		
2025	Scarlet	Voltemand (voice)		
2026	Goodbye My Car	Atsushi Miyake		

=== Television ===
Year	Title	Role	Notes	Ref.
2013	The Brothers Karamazov	Bunzō Kurosawa		
2013	Hanzawa Naoki	Hiroshi Naitō		
2014	Hanako and Anne	Densuke Kanō	Asadora	
2014	Mozu	Jin Nakagami		
2016	Sanada Maru	Oda Nobunaga	Taiga drama	
2016	Totto TV	Hisaya Morishige		
2016	Yuriko-san no Ehon	Hiroshi Harashima		
2016	We're Millennials. Got a Problem?	Iwao Aso		
2018	From Today, It's My Turn!!	Ichirō Mitsuhashi		
2018–24	Ossan's Love	Musashi Kurosawa	3 seasons	
2019	Ieyasu, Edo wo Tateru	Gotō Tokujō		
2020	The Yagyu Conspiracy	Yagyū Munenori	Lead role; TV movie	
2020	The Sun Stands Still: The Eclipse	Tōru Nagashima		
2020–21	Awaiting Kirin	Matsunaga Hisahide	Taiga drama	
2021	Nakamura Nakazo: Shusse no Kizahashi		Miniseries	
2021	Japan Sinks: People of Hope	Mamoru Amami	Special appearance	
2022	Hey Handsome!!	Gentaro Ito	Lead role	
2024	Oshi no Ko	Ichigo Saitō		
2025	Anpan	Kamaji Asada	Asadora	

== Awards and honors ==
Year	Honors	Ref.
2026	Medal with Purple Ribbon	

Year	Award ceremony	Category	Result	Ref.
2014	7th Tokyo Drama Awards	Best Supporting Actor	Won	
2018	11th Tokyo Drama Awards	Best Supporting Actor	Won	
