= Cube 2: Hypercube =

2002 film by Andrzej Sekula

- Theatrical release poster
- Directed by: Andrzej Sekuła
- Screenplay by: Sean Hood; Ernie Barbarash; Lauren McLaughlin
- Story by: Sean Hood
- Produced by: Ernie Barbarash; Suzanne Colvin
- Starring: Kari Matchett; Geraint Wyn Davies; Grace Lynn Kung; Matthew Ferguson; Neil Crone
- Cinematography: Andrzej Sekuła
- Edited by: Mark Sanders
- Music by: Norman Orenstein
- Distributed by: Lions Gate Films
- Release dates: 29 July 2002 (München Fantasy Filmfest); 15 April 2003 (United States)
- Running time: 94 minutes
- Country: Canada
- Language: English
- Box office: $3.5 million

Cube 2: Hypercube (stylized on-screen as Cube²: Hypercube) is a 2002 Canadian science fiction horror film directed by Andrzej Sekuła, written by Sean Hood, and produced by Ernie Barbarash, Peter Block, and Suzanne Colvin. It is the second installment in the Cube film series and a sequel to Cube (1997).

Released in 2002, Hypercube replaces the colored industrial-style rooms of the first film with high-tech, brightly lit chambers. Instead of industrial traps such as flamethrowers and extending spikes, the rooms have "evolved" to control illusions, time, space, and reality.

The film's critical reception was mixed, with reviewers panning the sequel's poorly produced CGI, writing, and production, but praising its evolution from the first film, its acting, and its suspense.

== Plot ==
A woman named Becky wakes up in the Cube. She enters another room. The room enters a state of reversed gravity and it is implied that she is killed.

Seven captives, Kate, Simon, Sasha, Jerry, Max, Julia, and Mrs. Paley, find themselves trapped in cubes. They come across Colonel Thomas Maguire, who informs the group that they must solve a code in order to escape. A wall then begins to close in on the group. They escape while Thomas stays behind and is killed. Experiences around the cube reveal that gravity can operate in different directions in each room, while Mrs. Paley and Jerry realize that they may be in a tesseract, or a hypercube. Kate notices the numbers "60659" in many rooms.

The group soon realizes that they are all in some way connected to Izon, a high level weapons manufacturer. Mrs. Paley opens a panel to reveal her being killed by Simon, who is decapitated soon after by beams. Jerry theorizes that it is a parallel universe, while Max and Julia think it is an illusion. Simon explains to Jerry that he is an investigator and is looking for Becky. Later, while the group is asleep, Sasha hears a noise and awakens everyone. The group finds a square in the middle of the room, which grows into variations of a tesseract, before expanding into a frame. The group flees into another room, but Jerry is injured and killed by the tesseract, which grows rapidly. Kate remains to save Sasha, who is still trapped in the room. Sasha and Kate are separated from the remainder of the group as a result.

Simon starts to suspect that Mrs. Paley is a spy, so he gags her and ties her up, but beams start protruding from the walls. Simon tries to save Mrs. Paley, but Paley refuses to let him go, so he stabs her with his knife. Max and Julia take the opportunity to escape from Simon to a different room. After experiencing time differences between rooms, they have a heated conversation which lead to them having sex, while in a room that is zero-gravity and time-dilated. They age rapidly and die. Kate finds the corpses floating in the air. Simon continues to degrade mentally as he begins to embrace the parallel universe theory. He encounters a parallel Jerry and Becky and kills them both.

Kate finds realities of her death in other rooms and is horrified. Sasha tells Kate that time and space are distorted where they are and reality is collapsing. She reveals that she is Alex Trusk who is responsible for the creation of the tesseract. She also reveals that she tried to stop their operation, but was pursued so she "fled into the only place they wouldn't follow." Kate still believes that there is a way out. After she is attacked by Simon, she manages to stab him in the eye. Not long after he appears behind Alex, looking older and more dishevled, carrying tokens from several versions of the people he has killed. Alex claims that they "are all dead", which causes Simon to snap her neck.

Kate finds that the tesseract is shrinking, and she stabs Simon in the leg with his knife and punches him in his throat. She looks at the duplicates of Jerry's watch and realizes that "60659" is the time that the tesseract will implode. She takes Alex's necklace, which is filled with information on Izon. The hypercube starts to wear away, and Kate opens a panel in the bottom. She jumps in just as the Hypercube implodes.

Kate wakes up in the hands of authorities in a factory. She gives them the necklace, but she is shot in the head by one of the operatives. An authority reports that "Phase 2 is terminated" as the operatives leave the facility.

== Cast ==
- Kari Matchett as Kate Filmore, who is a psychotherapist. She is portrayed as the most empathetic character in the group.
- Geraint Wyn Davies as Simon Grady, a private detective hired to locate a young woman named Becky Young who is missing.
- Grace Lynn Kung as Alexandra "Sasha" Trusk, a blind teenager and a professional computer hacker.
- Neil Crone as Jerry Whitehall, an engineer who worked on the hypercube's touch panels for the doors. He is shown to have an understanding of Quantum physics.
- Matthew Ferguson as Max Riesler, a computer hacker and game developer.
- Lindsey Connell as Julia Sewell, an LA defense lawyer representing Izon.
- Greer Kent as Becky Young, a missing young Izon worker whose parents hired Simon Grady to find her.
- Bruce Gray as Colonel Thomas H. Maguire, a man who is intimately linked with at least the first Cube.
- Barbara Gordon as Mrs. Paley, a retired theoretical mathematician who worked for Izon.
- Andrew Scorer as Dr. Phil Rosenzweig, a Nobel Prize nominee, former colleague of Mrs. Paley, and former employee of Izon.
- Paul Robbins as Tracton
- Philip Akin as The General

== Production ==
=== Writing ===
The original screenplay written by Sean Hood, which was subsequently rewritten by producer Ernie Barbarash, had a substantially different plot, theme, and characters, as well as a set of over 70 production illustrations, which visualized quite different traps, environments, and four-dimensional concepts.

== Release ==
=== Home media ===
Hypercube premiered at the München Fantasy Filmfest on 29 July 2002 and was later released on DVD on 15 April 2003. A Blu-Ray was released in Italy on 08 October 2015.

=== Alternate ending ===
The longer alternate ending included in the special features on the DVD reveals the "owners" to be the government; in the shorter version it is unclear who they are, but it is assumed they are Izon. Kate is executed in both versions, but she is praised for being the first operative to make it out alive. In the alternate ending it is revealed to Kate that she was in the Hypercube for just six minutes and fifty-nine seconds. It was an experiment used for quantum teleportation.

== Reception ==
=== Critical response ===
Cube 2: Hypercube holds a rating of 45% on Rotten Tomatoes. Reviews are mixed, with Sci-Fi Movie Page and Film Threat giving positive ratings for the film, and sites such as JoBlo.com and DVD Verdict panning it. EfilmCritic.com wrote that "while the acting isn't quite top-shelf, the cast is still serviceable enough to carry the increasing claustrophobia and confusion that sets in, and they're all quite likable in their own B movie way."

Bloody Disgusting wrote: "With pacing that's snail-like slow at times mixed with the horrid FX and lack of unique kill scenes, the film falls way short of my expectations, especially after waiting six years! But if you are a big fan of the first Cube, and expect a little less, you will enjoy Cube 2: Hypercube."

== See also ==
- Simulated reality
- QBism — a controversial application of Bayesian probabilities to quantum mechanics
