= Zachary Bennett =

Canadian actor (born 1980)

- Born: February 17, 1980 (age 46); London, Ontario, Canada
- Other name: Zach Bennett
- Occupations: Actor, musician
- Years active: 1986–present
- Spouse: Meaghan Denomme (m. 2012)
- Children: 1
- Relatives: Sophie Bennett (sister)
- Musical career
- Genres: Indie rock, alt-country, alternative
- Instrument: Vocals
- Member of: Tin Star Orphans

Zachary Bennett (born February 17, 1980) is a Canadian actor and musician.

== Early life ==
Zachary Bennett was born in London, Ontario. He is the second youngest of four children; his siblings are fellow actors Garreth Bennett, Mairon Bennett, and Sophie Bennett.

== Career ==
=== Acting career ===
Bennett is best known for playing Felix King in Road to Avonlea, for which he received a Gemini Award nomination for Best Actor in a Continuing Leading Dramatic Role at the 7th Gemini Awards in 1993.

He was also a Daytime Emmy Award nominee for Outstanding Performer in Children's Programming in 1990 for his role in the television film Looking for Miracles, and a Genie Award nominee for Best Actor at the 22nd Genie Awards in 2002 for the film Desire.

=== Musical career ===
Bennett formed the indie rock band Yonder in 2004, which was renamed Tin Star Orphans in 2008. The band's debut album, Skywalk to Crescent Town, was released in 2008, before being reissued under the title Yonder in 2009 after they changed their name and signed to the Sparks Music label.

They released two further albums, The Days of Blinding Fear in 2010 and Tin Star Orphans in 2014.

== Filmography ==
=== Film ===
Year	Title	Role	Notes
1988	The Good Mother	Young Bobby	
1998	Blind Faith	Bobby Dolman	
1998	The Hairy Bird	Skunk	AKA, All I Wanna Do
1998	Dog Park	Dougie	
1999	2 Little, 2 Late	Mickey McGouvney	
2000	Desire	Francis Waterson	
2002	The Bay of Love and Sorrows	Tom Donnerel	
2004	The Sadness of Johnson Joe Jangles	Johnson Joe Jangles	Short film
2004	Cube Zero	Eric Wynn	
2006	Jekyll + Hyde	Dan	Video
2007	The Poet	Bernard	
2007	Homecoming	Drew	Short film
2008	Just Business	David Snow	Video
2008	Grindstone Road	John Dodson	
2009	The Boondock Saints II: All Saints Day	Roy	
2012	Still Mine	Jeff Leblanc	
2013	Relax, I'm from the Future	Time traveller	Short film
2016	Maudie	Charles	
2016	Hacker	Curtis	
2017	Be My Guest	Tim	Short
2019	Ice Princess Lily	Emra / Frog	Voice; credited as Zach Bennett
2022	Relax, I'm from the Future	Chuck	Feature expansion of the 2013 short film; not in the same role.

=== Television ===
Year	Title	Role	Notes
1986	The Christmas Toy	Jesse Jones	TV film
1988	Katts and Dog	Danny	Episode: "Race Against Time"
1988	The Twilight Zone	Brian Harris	Episode: "There Was an Old Woman"
1989	Friday the 13th: The Series	J.B	Episode: "A Friend to the End"
1989	Looking for Miracles	Sullivan Delaney	TV film
1989	Lantern Hill	Jimmy-John Meade	TV film
1990	The Ray Bradbury Theater	Hank Walterson	Episode: "The Black Ferris"
1990	Back to Hannibal	Marcus	TV film
1990–96	Road to Avonlea	Felix King	Main role
1991	Tropical Heat	Robbie Lawson	Episode: "Big Brother Is Watching"
1991	Nilus the Sandman: The Boy Who Dreamed Christmas	Peter Fletcher	TV film
1992	By Way of the Stars	Lukas Bienmann	TV miniseries
1993	Exploring Ontario's Provincial Parks	Pete Burke	TV miniseries
1993	The Hidden Room	Mike	Episode: "Jillie"
1993	Ghost Mom	Tony	TV film
1994	Tales from the Cryptkeeper	Buddy	Voice, episode: "Game Over"
1994	Free Willy	Jesse Greenwood	Voice, main role
1998	Nothing Too Good for a Cowboy	Ed	TV film
1998	An Avonlea Christmas	Felix King	TV film
1998	Mythic Warriors	Talos	Voice, episode: "Daedalus and Icarus"
1999	The Secret Path	Young Paul	TV film
1999	Bonanno: A Godfather's Story	Bill Bonanno	TV film
2000	Life in a Day	Mark Stratton	TV film
2000	Twice in a Lifetime	Young Reese O'Malley	Episode: "The Frat Pack"
2000–01	Anne of Green Gables: The Animated Series	Lorne	Voice, 2 episodes
2002	A Killing Spring	Zack	TV film
2002	Verdict in Blood	Zack	TV film
2002	Salem Witch Trials	Joseph Putnam	TV film
2002	Moville Mysteries	Rico Caliente	Voice, episode: "The Day Rico Became Smart"
2003	Shattered City: The Halifax Explosion	Ernest Masterson	TV film
2004	Snakes and Ladders	Lovell Thomas	Episode: "American Pie"
2006	Legacy of Fear	Val Grosmont	TV film
2006–07	Z-Squad	Jinu	TV series
2007	The Climb	Blair Griffiths	TV miniseries
2007–12	Bakugan Battle Brawlers	Shun Kazami	Voice, main cast
2007	Stir of Echoes: The Homecoming	Jake Witzky	TV film
2008	The Border	Daniel Winters	Episode: "Civil Disobedience"
2009	Nerdland	Beast	Voice, TV film
2009	Angora Napkin	Jumbo Shrimp, Zen Master	Voice, television film
2010	Rookie Blue	Ben Leigh	Episode: "Girlfriend of the Year"
2011	Flashpoint	Dr. Valo	Episode: "Collateral Damage"
2011	Covert Affairs	Gideon Phillips	Episode: "Bang and Blame"
2011	Lost Girl	Cheeno	Episode: "Death Didn't Become Him"
2011–present	Wild Kratts	Zach Varmitech, Chef Gourmand	Voice, main cast
2011–12	Detentionaire	Biffy Goldstein	Voice, main role
2012	BeyWheelz	Leon	Voice, 2 episodes
2012	Murdoch Mysteries	Alexander Wallensky	Episode: "Who Killed the Electric Carriage?"
2012	King	Ben Hope	Episode: "Isabelle Toomey"
2012	Saving Hope	Benjamin Munk	Episode: "Blindness"
2012	Come Dance with Me	Rick	TV film
2013	Mother Up!	Joel	Voice, 2 episodes
2013	Jack	Brad Lavigne	TV film
2013	Arthur	General Higgins / Weatherman	Voice, episode: "Pets and Pests/Go Fly a Kite"
2014	Orphan Black	Officer Tom Bowman	Episode: "Mingling Its Own Nature with It"
2014	Total Drama: Pahkitew Island	Shawn	Voice, main role (13 episodes)
2014	BeyWarriors: BeyRaiderz	Leon Fierce	Voice, English dub
2015	Rocket Monkeys	Rock	Voice, episode: "Rock On"
2015	Reign	Lt. Joubert	Episode: "Abandoned"
2015	Rogue	Ryan Bosch	Episode: "Beyond Judgment"
2016	Ranger Rob	Dad	Voice, recurring role
2016–17	The ZhuZhus	Stanley Pamplemousse	Voice, recurring role
2017–18	Workin' Moms	Carl	5 episodes
2017	Suits		Episode: "Shame"
2017	Designated Survivor	Sen. Cameron Feller	Episode: "Sting of the Tail"
2017	Frankie Drake Mysteries: A Cold Case	Paul Landell	Web series
2018	Inspector Gadget	Tag Shrapnel	Voice
2018	Esme & Roy	Mr. Plink	Voice, 12 episodes
2019	The Umbrella Academy	Lance Biggs	3 episodes
2019–20	Corn & Peg	Coach Clydesdale	Voice, recurring role
2020	Hey Lady!	Rover	

=== Video games ===
Year	Title	Role	Notes
2009	Bakugan Battle Brawlers	Shun Kazami	English dub
2015	Assassin's Creed Syndicate	Jude Boyd	
2021	Far Cry 6	Jacob Seed	
