= Grace Lynn Kung =

Canadian actress (born 1987)

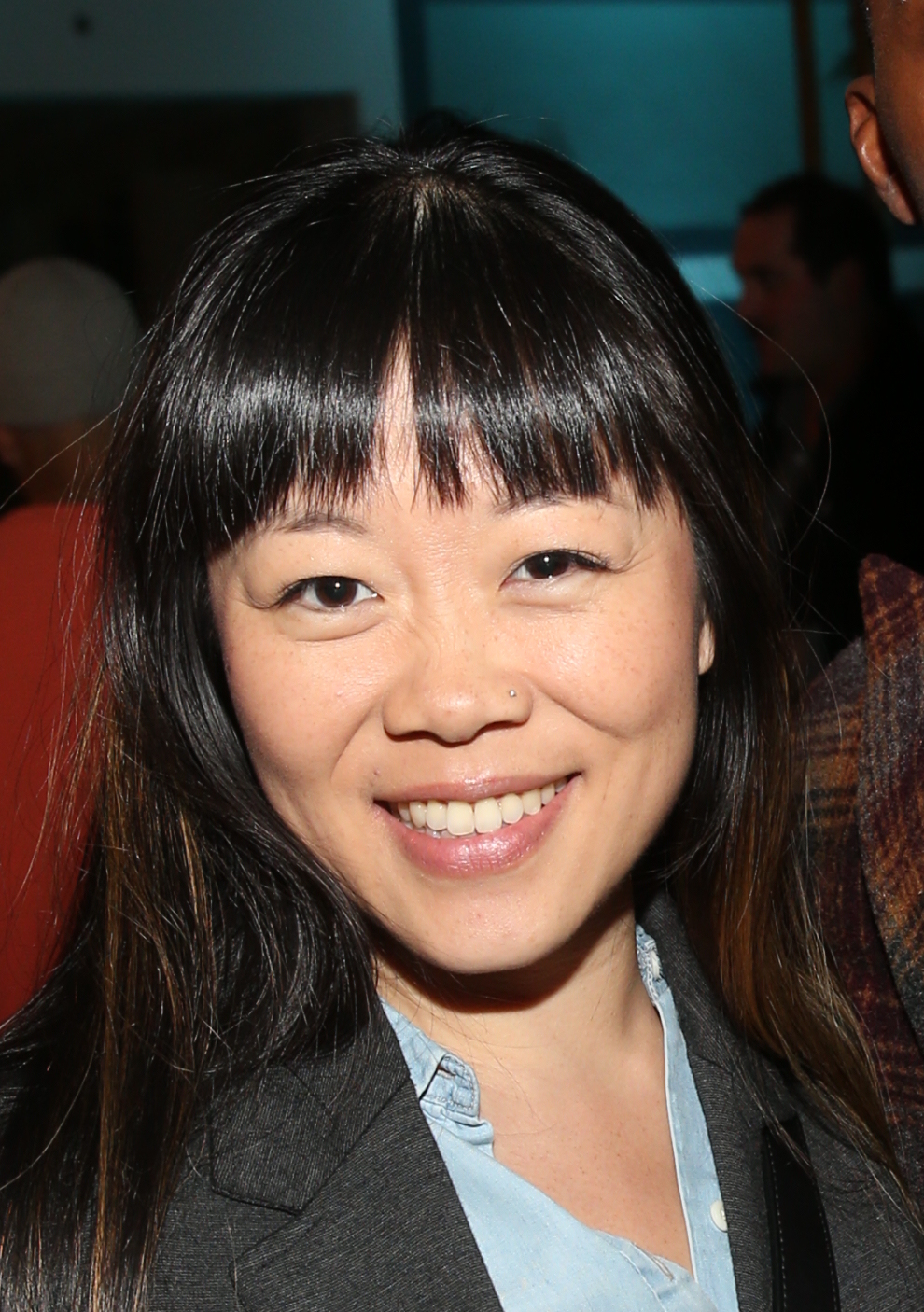
- Kung in 2019
- Born: March 25, 1987 (age 39); Ottawa, Ontario, Canada
- Occupation: Actress
- Years active: 2001–present

Grace Lynn Kung (born March 25, 1987) is a Canadian actress. She received a Canadian Screen Award nomination for the spy series InSecurity as Jojo Kwan.

Kung holds two certificates of distinction from Trinity College London in the United Kingdom, where she also studied naturopathic medicine. She has appeared in Fahrenheit 451, Star Trek: Discovery, Miss Sloane, and Designated Survivor.

Screen credits include The Expanse, The Strain, Being Erica, Away From Her, Slings & Arrows, Odd Squad, House Party, and Cube 2: Hypercube. On stage, she has performed The Vagina Monologues in Oranjestad, Aruba, as Janet in the award-winning play Kim's Convenience, Izzy in Seminar by Theresa Rebeck, Zoe/The Girl in La Ronde, Yuko in Yukonstyle at Canadian Stage Company, collaborating with Judith Thompson on her new works and playing writer-historian Iris Chang in the international debut of A Nanking Winter by Marjorie Chan at Nightwood Theatre, a theatre specialising in forging creative alliances among female artists.

== Filmography ==
=== Films ===
List of film credits
Year	Title	Role	Notes
2001	Lost and Delirious	Lauren	Credited as Grace Kung
2002	Cube 2: Hypercube	Sasha	
2006	Injustice	Erica Lam	
2006	Away from Her	Nurse Betty	
2007	Blue State	Esther Yang	
2007	P2	Kim Phu (Woman in Elevator)	
2008	One Week	n/a	
2013	Bank$tas	Diane	
2015	Portrait of a Serial Monogamist	Eve	
2016	The Death (and Life) of Carl Naardlinger	Pam Naardlinger	Nominated – ACTRA Award for Outstanding performance - Female
2016	Miss Sloane	Lauren	
2016	Dissecting Gwen	Gwen	Short film
2016	Birdland	Claire	
2017	Expiry Date	Madison Von Boheme	
2017	Cult of Chucky	Claire	
2017	The Carmilla Movie	Charlotte Brontë	
2018	Fahrenheit 451	Chairman Mao	
2019	Lie Exposed	Betsy	
2023	Invitation to a Murder	Lu	

=== Television ===
List of television credits
Year	Title	Role	Notes
2003	Open House	Lavender Blue	Television film, CBS
2005	Plague City: SARS in Toronto	April	Television film
2005	Slings & Arrows	Emily Lu	5 episodes
2006	G-Spot	Belinda	Episode: Lucky
2006	Night of Terror	Donna	Television film
2006	House Party	Allison	Television film
2007	Billable Hours	The Bad Ass	Episode: Cancer, Baby!
2007	Stir of Echoes: The Homecoming	Friendly Nurse	Television film
2008	The Border	Lab Tech	Episode: Enemy Contact
2008	House Party	Allison	6 episodes
2009	Retail	Jill	Television film
2009 – 2010	Being Erica	Meeri Kung	9 episodes
2011 – 2012	InSecurity	JoJo Kwan	Regular role Nominated – Gemini Award for Best Performance by an Actress in a Continuing Leading Comedic Role (2011)
2012	The Listener	Lucy Estevez	Episode: Crossed
2013	Mother Up!	Suzi Chu	2 episodes
2013	The Doozers	The Doozer Reuser (voice)	Episode: Doozers Re-Users
2013	Degrassi: The Next Generation	Police Officer	Episodes: Karma Police (Parts 1 & 2)
2014	Remedy	Dr. Livia Fung	Episode: The Living Things
2014	The Lottery	Sara Bell	Episode: Rules of the Game
2014	Touring T.O.	Samantha	8 episodes
2015	Hard Rock Medical	Heather	4 episodes
2015	The Strain	Grace Wu	Episode: Intruders
2015	Heartland	Vanessa	Episode: Fearless
2015 - 2016	Odd Squad	Evil Teddy	2 episodes
2016	12 Monkeys	Stacy	Episode: Bodies of Water
2017	Mary Kills People	Annie Chun	Series regular
2017	The Expanse	Doris	Episode: Pyre
2017	Designated Survivor	Congresswoman Mae Yoshida	2 episodes
2017	Star Trek: Discovery	Psycho	Episode: Context Is for Kings
2017–2021	Frankie Drake Mysteries	Wendy Quon	Recurring
2019	The InBetween	Amy Shu	Recurring
2019	The Stranded	Professor Lin	Thai TV series
2020	Transplant	Vivian Barnes	
2020	Japan Sinks: 2020	Mari Mutō (voice)	Netflix ONA; English dub
2020	Hey Lady!	Molly	
2021–2023	Sort Of	Bessy	CBC; HBO Max
2023	Wong & Winchester	Marissa Wong	
2026	Law & Order Toronto: Criminal Intent	Sonoya Lee	season 3 episode 1 "Skin Deep"

=== Video games ===
List of video game credits
Year	Title	Role	Notes
2013	The Doozers	Doozer Reuser	
2014	Far Cry 4	Kirat, Female Rebel Soldiers	
2018	For Honor	Ying (Female Tiandi)	Marching Fire
2020	Fallout 76: Wastelanders	Agent Mochou, Libby Wen, Chinese Soldiers	DLC

=== Accolades ===
Year	Award	Category	Nominee(s)	Result	Ref.
2022	Peabody Awards	Entertainment	Sort Of	Nominated	
