= Cube Zero =

2004 film by Ernie Barbarash

- Theatrical release poster
- Directed by: Ernie Barbarash
- Written by: Ernie Barbarash
- Produced by: Suzanne Colvin Goulding; Jon Goulding
- Starring: Zachary Bennett; David Huband; Stephanie Moore; Michael Riley; Martin Roach; Mike "Nug" Nahrgang; Terri Hawkes; Richard McMillan; Tony Munch; Jasmin Geljo
- Cinematography: François Dagenais
- Edited by: Mitchell Lackie; Mark Sanders
- Music by: Norman Orenstein
- Distributed by: Lions Gate Films
- Release dates: 15 October 2004 (Screamfest); 22 February 2005 (United States)
- Running time: 97 minutes
- Country: Canada
- Language: English

Cube Zero is a 2004 Canadian science fiction psychological horror film written and directed by Ernie Barbarash, in his directorial debut. It is the third installment in the Cube film series and a prequel to Cube (1997).

The first two films take place almost entirely within the Cube maze, and Cube Zero is set in both its interior and exterior. It reverts to the industrial-designed, colored rooms of the first Cube, but with a refreshed and redesigned set.

== Plot ==
Ryjkin is a man trying to escape from a Cube labyrinth. (Note: Similar to the labyrinth depicted in the film Cube (1997)) He triggers a trap which sprays him with water. Dehydrated, he frenziedly laps it up. However, the water contains a rapidly acting flesh-eating virus and his body disintegrates.

The rooms in the Cube labyrinth are being monitored from a station manned by two technicians, Wynn and Dodd. They oversee the rooms and the people imprisoned inside, but do not know who their employers are or why the Cube exists. During their shifts, they play chess, and Wynn demonstrates an ability to predict his opponent's moves.

Wynn and Dodd are given orders to record the dreams of a prisoner named Rains. Wynn observes a memory of Rains being captured by soldiers while walking through a forest with her daughter Anna. Rains wakes up in the Cube and meets the other occupants. One of them, Haskell, has a tattoo on his forehead matching that of one of the soldiers who captured her. While Haskell has no memory of how he came to be inside the Cube, the other captives explain that they had been convicted for crimes but agreed to take part in experiments instead of serving their sentences. However, Wynn and Dodd cannot find any record of Rains's consent to participate in the Cube in her files.

Wynn and Dodd receive instructions from their superiors to enact a procedure on a man named Owen who has successfully escaped the Cube labyrinth. At a terminal containing two buttons labeled "YES" and "NO", Dodd, following directions from a manual, asks Owen over a loudspeaker whether he believes in God. When he answers no, Dodd presses the "NO" button, which results in Owen being immolated. Dodd reveals that no one has ever answered yes to the question. Horrified by what he has witnessed, Wynn decides to enter the Cube to save Rains, confident his ability to predict will help him memorise the path to safety.

Dodd's supervisor, Jax, and two analysts arrive at the monitoring station to try to stop Wynn. Dodd sabotages the Cube's control panels in an effort to help Wynn, disabling the labyrinth's traps and initiating a reset that will vaporize everything inside after ten minutes. Jax kills Dodd and activates a mechanism that causes Haskell to hunt down Wynn and Rains. The pair escape through a hidden auxiliary passage as the reset begins, vaporizing Haskell. Wynn and Rains emerge from a lake in a forest seen in Rains's dreams, where soldiers pursue them. Rains escapes, but Wynn is struck by a tranquilizer dart and recaptured.

Wynn awakens in a surgical facility, where Jax informs him that he has been convicted of treason and sabotage. Jax produces a consent form bearing Wynn's signature and claims that he agreed to become a test subject years earlier, but Wynn has no memory of signing it. As Jax orders Wynn's brain to be surgically altered, Wynn dreams of Rains reuniting with Anna and describing him as a hero.

The procedure leaves Wynn mentally impaired and he is returned to the Cube, where he is found by other captives. In a scene resembling Kazan from the first film, Wynn mentions the color of the room and that he wants to go back to a room of a different color.

== Cast ==
- Zachary Bennett as Eric Wynn, a junior Cube technician. A child prodigy and a genius, he is the newest recruit for the Cube.
- David Huband as Dodd, a senior Cube technician, who is at odds with Wynn for his constant questioning personality.
- Stephanie Moore as Cassandra Rains, a political demonstrator trapped in the Cube.
- Michael Riley as Jax, senior supervisor of the Cube, fitted with an artificial eye.
- Martin Roach as Robert P. Haskell, an ex Cube soldier trapped in the Cube.
- Mike "Nug" Nahrgang as Meyerhold, a man trapped in the Cube.
- Terri Hawkes as Jellico, a woman trapped in the Cube.
- Richard McMillan as Bartok, a man trapped in the Cube.
- Tony Munch as Owen, a senior cube technician placed in the Cube.
- Jasmin Geljo as Ryjkin, a man trapped in the Cube.
- Joshua Peace as Finn
- Diego Klattenhoff as Quigley

== Release ==
The film premiered at the Screamfest Horror Film Festival on 15 October 2004. It was released on DVD in the United States on 22 February 2005.

== Reception ==
Reviews have been mostly positive, including positive notices from JoBlo.com, AMC's Movie Guide, DVD Talk, and Bloody Disgusting, with Bloody Disgusting saying that "Cube Zero isn't the best of the series, but it comes close".

The film won the award for "Best Special Effects" at the 2004 Screamfest Horror Film Festival.
