= Neil Crone =

Canadian actor, comedian, writer and motivational speaker (born 1960)

- Born: May 29, 1960 (age 66); Toronto, Ontario, Canada
- Education: Sir John A. McDonald Collegiate Institute; Ryerson Polytechnical Institute; University of Toronto
- Occupations: Actor; comedian; writer; motivational speaker
- Years active: 1990–present
- Spouse: Kathryn Kelly

Neil Crone (born May 29, 1960) is a Canadian actor and writer. He is known for portraying Fred Tupper in Little Mosque on the Prairie, Jerry Whitehall in Cube 2: Hypercube and the voices of Gordon, Diesel 10 and Splatter in Thomas and the Magic Railroad (2000). Crone reprised his role as Gordon in the US dub of the Thomas & Friends reboot, Thomas & Friends: All Engines Go (2021–2025).

He appeared in films with roles as Officer Strauss in New York Minute (2004), Chuck in Hollywoodland (2006), Keith in The Rainbow Kid (2015), Chief Borton in the 2017 remake It (2017) and its 2019 sequel, and George in Through Black Spruce (2018).

His television credits include Bud Topper in the PBS Kids children's television series Noddy (1999–2000), Ed Barnes in the sitcom I Love Mummy (2002–2003), Ray Cooper in Really Me (2011–2013), Chief Crown Attorney Gordon in Murdoch Mysteries (2013–2016), Ollie Jefferson in Wind at My Back (1996–2000) Ronnie Stewart in When Hope Calls (2019, 2021) and Mr. Leopold in Endlings (2020–2021).

== Early life and education ==
Crone was born on May 29, 1960, in Scarborough, Toronto. He attended Sir John A. MacDonald Collegiate Institute and then studied radio and television arts at Ryerson Polytechnical Institute before earning a degree in education from the University of Toronto. He taught English and drama for three years at King City Secondary School before launching his acting career. He would land a role at Toronto’s The Second City Touring Company before moving onto its main stage.

== Career ==
Crone did the voices of Gordon the Big Engine, Diesel 10 and Splatter from the film Thomas and the Magic Railroad. He provided the voice of Phillip the Concierge in the My Secret Identity episode "Sour Grapes". He has also starred in I Love Mummy, The Red Green Show, the CTV series Power Play, and American Psycho 2: All American Girl. He is also known for being a panelist on the Vancouver-based game show The Next Line and was the host of a children's game show called Wild Guess.

Crone portrayed radio host Fred Tupper on the CBC Television situation comedy series Little Mosque on the Prairie. He also voiced Robert on the animated series Iggy Arbuckle, Reverend McRee in Bob and Doug and Dwayne in Total Drama Presents: The Ridonculous Race. Crone has appeared on international and syndicated shows such as Get Focused Radio with Kate Hennessy.

Crone also played live-action roles such as Maddy's dad, Ray, in Really Me and a cop at protest in Hairspray.

He also writes regular articles for the Durham Region's This Week newspaper.

In 2021, Crone reprised his role as Gordon the Big Engine in Thomas & Friends: All Engines Go, a reboot of the original Thomas & Friends series.

== Personal life ==
Crone is currently married to Kathryn Kelly.

== Filmography ==
=== Film ===
Year	Title	Role(s)	Notes
1991	The Homework Bureau	Chuck Spence	Short film
1994	The Killing Machine	Main Nurse	
1998	Cousins	Stan	Direct to video
1999	Pushing Tin	Tom	
2000	Bruiser	Boss	
2000	Thomas and the Magic Railroad	Gordon the Big Engine, Diesel 10, Splatter (voices)	Replacement voice of Keith Scott and Patrick Breen.
2000	Thomas and the Magic Railroad	Tumbleweed	Uncredited voice
2000	Thomas and the Magic Railroad	Troublesome Trucks	Original voice with Kevin Frank; also creative consultant
2000	Bait	Supervisor	
2000	Left Behind: The Movie	Ken Ritz	Direct to video
2002	American Psycho II: All American Girl	Harvey	Direct to video
2002	Rolie Polie Olie: The Great Defender of Fun	Dr. Geary (video)	Direct to video
2002	Cube 2: Hypercube	Jerry Whitehall	
2003	The Recruit	Farm Instructor #3	
2003	Rhinoceros Eyes	Security Guard	
2003	Love, Sex and Eating the Bones	Anthony Mingelli	
2003	Eloise at Christmastime	Agent Kringle	
2004	Against the Ropes	HBO Commentator	
2004	New York Minute	Officer Strauss	
2004	Care Bears: Journey to Joke-a-lot	Bidel (voice)	
2005	Re-Entering the Nightmare	Jerry Whitehall	Short film Direct to video Archival footage
2006	Hollywoodland	Chuck	
2006	Homie Spumoni	Irish Cop	
2007	Leader of the Track		
2007	Hairspray	Cop At Protest	
2008	Eating Buccaneers	Pilot	
2011	Down the Road Again	Jimmy	
2014	Pushers	Teacher	Short film
2014	A Very Larry Christmas	Santa	
2015	The Rainbow Kid	Keith	
2017	Bon Cop, Bad Cop 2	Middle Brook Police Chief	
2017	It	Chief Borton	
2017	Christmas Inheritance	Jim Langford	
2018	Through Black Spruce	George	
2018	Ode to Rita	Lloyd	Short film
2019	It Chapter Two	Chief Borton	
2019	An Assortment of Christmas Tales in No Particular Order	Lloyd	
2021	Paw Patrol: The Movie	Tony (voice)	
2021	Thomas and Friends: Race For the Sodor Cup	Gordon the Big Engine (voice)	U.S. dub
2022	Thomas & Friends: The Mystery of Lookout Mountain	Gordon the Big Engine (voice)	U.S. dub; uncredited
2022	Tehranto	Dr. Urowitz	
2022	Hotel for the Holidays	Milton	
2023	World's Best	Sportscaster	Cameo
2023	Paw Patrol: The Mighty Movie	Tony (voice)	
2025	Thomas & Friends: Sodor Sings Together	Gordon the Big Engine (voice)	U.S. dub

=== Television ===
Year	Title	Role	Notes
1990	My Secret Identity	Phillipe The Concierge	Episode: "Sour Grapes"
1991	Hammerman	Additional voices	
1991	The Red Green Show	'Doc' Render	4 episodes
1992	Stunt Dawgs	Needham, Whiz Vid (voices)	11 episodes
1994	Free Willy	Mr. Naugle (voice)	11 episodes
1994	RoboCop: The Series	Coroner / Schmidt	3 episodes
1995	Cagney & Lacey: The View Through the Glass Ceiling	Son	TV movie
1995	The Magic School Bus	Mr. Flack (voice)	Episode: "Out of This World"
1995–1996	The NeverEnding Story	Additional voices	26 episodes
1995–1997	Mr. Men and Little Miss	Mr. Bump / Mr. Topsy-Turvy / Mr. Silly / Mr. Small / Mr. Lazy / Mr. Impossible / Mr. Clumsy / Mr. Rush / Mr. Worry / Mr. Busy / Mr. Brave / Mr. Grumble / Additional Voices	US voices 39 episodes
1995–1998	The New Adventures of Sherlock Holmes	Wesley (voice)	78 episodes
1996	The Abduction	Mr. Williams	TV movie
1996–2000	Wind at My Back	Ollie Jefferson	21 episodes
1997–2000	Freaky Stories	Narrator (voice)	3 episodes
1997–1999	Monster Hunters	Paul Crawford (voice)	52 episodes
1997	Dead Silence	Airport Security Officer	TV movie
1997	Once a Thief: Brother Against Brother	The King	TV movie
1997	Franklin	Mr. Badger (voice)	Unknown episodes
1997	The Adventures of Sam & Max: Freelance Police	Additional voices	Episode: "We Drop at Dawn"
1997	Goosebumps	Blek / Host / Makeup Artist	two part episode: "One Day at Horrorland"
1998	Goosebumps	Mr. Chesney	two part episode: "The Ghost Next Door"
1998	Dumb Bunnies	Politician / Snow Bunny / Mr. Big's Assistant, Weatherman (voices)	4 episodes
1998	My Date with the President's Daughter	Agent Kelly	TV movie
1998	Nothing Too Good for a Cowboy	Bartender	TV movie
1998	Once a Thief	The King	Episode: "Family Reunion"
1998	Eerie, Indiana: The Other Dimension	Mr. Crawford	15 episodes
1998–2000	Power Play	Coach Harry Strand	22 episodes
1999	Coming Unglued	Cop	TV movie
1999–2000	Noddy	Bud Topper	26 episodes
1999–2000	Blaster's Universe	Additional voices	13 episodes
2000	PSI Factor: Chronicles of the Paranormal	Hank Kemper	Episode: "Force Majeure"
2000	Babar	Additional voices	13 episodes
2000	The Pooch and the Pauper	Jim Corbett	TV movie
2000	Mail to the Chief	Gallagher	TV movie
2001	Kiss My Act	Joke Exchange M.C.	TV movie
2001	The Wandering Soul Murders	Jerry	TV movie
2001	Murder Among Friends	Melvin Jarvis	TV movie
2001	The Day Reagan Was Shot	Lyn Nofziger	TV movie
2001	Screech Owls	Muck 2 Sessions	26 episodes
2001	Blue Murder	Jerry Kish	Episode: "Baby Point"
2001	The Pretender: Island of the Haunted	Alley Sports Bar Owner	Uncredited; TV movie
2001	Hippo Tub Co.	Norton / Mayor Drip (voices)	3 episodes
2001	The Zack Files	Marlon	Episode: "Captain Sonic"
2001–2002	Pecola	Dr. Chu	15 episodes English voice
2002	The Associates	Ralph Fort	Episode: "Winner Take All"
2002	Tracker	Chuck / Sedra	Episode: "Love, Cirronian Style"
2002	Puppets Who Kill	Councillor Trump	Episode: "Buttons, the City Councillor and the City Councillor's Wife"
2002	Rescue Heroes	Bickering Neighbor #1 (voice)	Episode: "Fiery Differences"
2002	Widows	Eddie	Episode: "Hour One"; Television miniseries
2002	Monk	Terry T	Episode: "Mr. Monk and the Red-Headed Stranger"
2002	Sue Thomas: F.B.Eye	Patrol Man	Episode: "Pilot"
2002	Verdict in Blood	Coroner	TV movie
2002	Our America	Paxton Wade	TV movie
2002	Master Spy: The Robert Hanssen Story	Big FBI Man	TV movie
2002	The Red Sneakers	Coach Blake	TV movie
2002	Moville Mysteries	Mr. Caliente (voice)	Episode: "The Day Rico Became Smart"
2002 & 2003	RoboRoach	RoboReg / Sluggies / Ivan (voices)	2 episodes
2002 & 2003	I Love Mummy	Ed Barnes	26 episodes
2002–2007	American Bikers	Theo Pickles (voice)	Recurring role
2003	Doc	Dr. Englstad	2 episodes
2003	Odd-Job Jack	Dr. Murphy / Tooth Fairy (voices)	Episode: "Fatal Extraction"
2003	Street Time	Congressman Reemer	Episode: "Cop Killer"
2003	Jasper, Texas	Principal	TV movie
2004	Judgment Call	Frank	TV movie
2004	Bury the Lead	Frank Bonero	Episode: "Cowboy"
2004–2010	Franny's Feet	Additional voices	6 episodes
2005	True Crimes: The First 72 Hours	Detective Reid	Episode: "Murder on Campus"; Documentary
2005	Slam Dunk	Dr. T (voice)	English version
2005–2008	Miss BG	Dad (voice)	52 episodes
2006	At the Hotel	Deacon	3 episodes
2006	Solar Attack	Security Guard	TV movie
2006	The Path to 9/11	Dorsey	TV movie
2006	George Canyon's Christmas	Guardian Angel	TV movie
2006–2009	Erky Perky	Perky (voice)	39 episodes
2007	The Future Is Wild	Zuma (voice)	Episode: "A Poggie's Not a Pet... Yet"
2007	Storm Hawks	Additional voices	
2007	Iggy Arbuckle	Robert 2007 (voice)	Episode: "Iggy vs. the Volcano/A Dip in the Pole"
2007	Stir of Echoes: The Homecoming	Gary	TV movie
2007	True Crimes: The First 72 Hours	Detective Alan Comeau	2 episodes: "Predator" and "Lust"; Documentaryseries
2007–2012	Little Mosque on the Prairie	Fred Tupper	Main role
2008	The Summit	General Stevens	2 episodes
2008	Gotta Catch Santa Claus	Kiosk Santa / Snowman (voices)	TV movie
2009	Warehouse 13	Mr. Ives	Episode: "Nevermore"
2009–2010	Pearlie	Additional voices	4 episodes
2010	Super Why!	Additional voices	Episode: "King Midas"
2010	Majority Rules	Emcee	Episode: "Becky for a Day"
2010	The Dating Guy	Greg (voice)	Episode: "Brother from Another Tanning Booth"
2011	King	Hank Oclum	Episode: "Eleni Demaris"
2011	The Adventures of Chuck and Friends	Coach (voice)	Episode: "Chuck Atomic/Chuck's Big Break"
2011	Reel Love	Tom Meyer	TV movie
2011	Wingin' It	Mr. Cakebread	Episode: "Lucy in the Sky with Carl"
2011–2013	Really Me	Ray Cooper	26 episodes
2012	Saving Hope	Anthony	Episode: "The Fight"
2012	XIII: The Series	Joe Wolf	Episode: "Punchout"
2013	Rookie Blue	Wilson Burr	Episode: "Surprises"
2013	Republic of Doyle	Clark Cooper	Episode: "Firecracker"
2013–2014	Ella the Elephant	Captain Gray / Captain Kelp (voices)	26 episodes
2013–2024	Murdoch Mysteries	Crown Attorney Allister Gordon	Recurring
2014	The Adventures of Napkin Man!	Monsieur Boulanger (voice)	Episode: "Hurry Up and Wait"
2014	Dear Viola	Earl Bellamy	TV movie
2014	Midnight Masquerade	Sam	TV movie
2014	One Starry Christmas	Ken Jensen	TV movie
2014	The Stanley Dynamic	Officer Ben	Episode: "The Stanley Crime"
2014	The Strain	Dr. Box	Episode: "Gone Smooth"
2014	Odd Squad	Santa	Episode: "Reindeer Games"
2015	Remedy	Clay Parr	Episode: "Our Friend, Chaos"
2015	The Secret Life of Marilyn Monroe	Ben Lyon	Miniseries
2015	Odd Squad	Frustrated Man	Episode: "Puppet Show/Mystic Egg Pizza"
2015	Total Drama Presents: The Ridonculous Race	Dwayne (voice)	17 episodes
2016	Terrific Trucks Save Christmas	Nick	TV movie
2016	The Girlfriend Experience	James Reade	Episode: "Home"
2016	Rogue	Earl Emmerson	Episode: "A Piece of Wood"
2016–2017	Luna Petunia	Ashton	26 episodes
2017	Love on Ice	Dave Shelton	TV movie
2017	The Great Northern Candy Drop	Bruce	TV movie
2017	Good Witch	Mr. Borba	Episode: "Without Magic for a Spell"
2017	Mysticons	Malachite Goldenbraid	Episode: "Heart of Gold"
2017–2018	Kody Kapow	Mogo (voice)	Main role
2018	Carter	Derwyn	Episode: "Happy Campers"
2019 & 2021	When Hope Calls	Ronnie Stewart	Recurring role season 1; Main role season 2
2019	Hotel Transylvania: The Series	Additional voices	Episode: "A Year without Creepmas"
2019	Northern Rescue	Mayor Johnson	2 episodes: "Making Lemonade" and "D-U-A-L-I-T-Y"
2019	The Ninth	Benjamin 'The Berg' Berger	Main role
2019–2020	Corn & Peg	Mayor Montagu (voice)	Main role
2020–2021	Endlings	Mr. Leopold	Main role
2020	Nurses	Sal	Episode: "What Size Are Your Feet?"
2021–2025	Thomas & Friends: All Engines Go	Gordon the Big Engine (voice)	Recurring role, U.S. dub
2021–2022	Big Blue	Captain No Beard/Spoony (voices)	Recurring role
2022	Ghosts	Benjamin Franklin	Episode: "The Liquor License" and "The Christmas Spirit, Part 2"
2023	Essex County	Dr. Byrne	Miniseries
