= American Psycho 2 =

2002 American black comedy slasher film by Morgan J. Freeman

- Original banner
- Directed by: Morgan J. Freeman
- Screenplay by: Alex Sanger; Karen Craig
- Based on: Characters by Bret Easton Ellis
- Produced by: Ernie Barbarash
- Starring: Mila Kunis; William Shatner
- Cinematography: Vanja Cernjul
- Edited by: Mark Sanders
- Music by: Norman Orenstein
- Production company: Lions Gate Films
- Distributed by: Lions Gate Home Entertainment
- Release date: June 18, 2002
- Running time: 88 minutes
- Country: United States
- Language: English
- Budget: $10 million

American Psycho 2 (also known as American Psycho II: All American Girl) is a 2002 American black comedy slasher film directed by Morgan J. Freeman from a screenplay by Alex Sanger and Karen Craig. Starring Mila Kunis and William Shatner, it is a stand-alone sequel to the film American Psycho (2000). Kunis portrays a criminology student who seeks to advance her career by murdering her classmates.

The screenplay for the film, entitled The Girl Who Wouldn't Die, originally had no association with American Psycho. After production began, the script was altered to connect the film with the original. American Psycho 2 was released direct-to-video on June 18, 2002. The film was panned by critics and denounced by Bret Easton Ellis, the author of the original novel; Kunis later expressed regret for her role in it.

== Plot ==
In early 1988, a twelve-year-old girl accompanies her babysitter on a date with serial killer Patrick Bateman. After Bateman kills and starts to dissect the babysitter, the girl kills him with an ice pick.

In 1993, the young girl, Rachael Newman, is now a college student studying criminology at a Washington university under Professor Starkman, a former FBI agent. Rachael aspires to join the FBI and is determined to get the coveted teaching assistant position under Starkman, which would make her a shoo-in for the FBI training program in Quantico, Virginia.

After secretary Gertrude Fleck rudely dismisses Rachael's application for the teaching assistant position on the basis that she is a freshman, Rachael follows her home and bludgeons her to death. Determined to succeed, Rachael proceeds to kill off any of her peers who stand as competition, starting with Brian Leads, whom she drugs and murders during a proposed sexual encounter. During her killing spree, Rachael decides to see the school psychiatrist, Dr. Eric Daniels.

Realizing that Rachael is a textbook sociopath who is obsessed with Starkman, Daniels tries to warn Starkman without revealing Rachael's name due to patient confidentiality. Starkman mistakenly assumes that the student obsessed with him is Cassandra Blaire, with whom he carries on an extramarital affair. When Cassandra reveals that her affair with Professor Starkman has guaranteed her the teaching assistant position, Rachael decides to murder her as well, staging her death as a suicide. Next, she murders Keith Lawson, a bookish classmate, while he is studying late one night in the university library.

Professor Starkman discovers Cassandra's body and calls Daniels to tell him that "she's dead". He does not identify the victim and Daniels assumes it must be Rachael. Distraught, Professor Starkman withdraws from the university, which incenses the obsessed Rachael. That night, Rachael locates an intoxicated Starkman in his office, impaired by the effects of Valium and alcohol, and tries to seduce him. However, Starkman sees she is wearing a dress and necklace he had given to Cassandra. She then confesses her crimes to him, her "crush" on him, and that she knows about his affairs with various women (which included her former babysitter that Bateman murdered), as he backs up towards the window in a state of confusion and fear. Rachael blows him a kiss, and he falls out the window to his death. As she leaves, Rachael also murders a janitor and a security guard because they witnessed Starkman's death.

On the last day of classes before spring break, Rachael's parents make a surprise visit to her at her dormitory. She quickly ushers them out, agreeing to meet them for dinner later that night. That same night, while treating his elderly mother to a night out, Daniels observes Rachael with her parents at a local restaurant. Daniels becomes suspicious since he believes Rachael is dead, and after dinner goes to the local police station to ask the police officers about any recent missing persons cases. Through a flashback, it is revealed that 'Rachael' is, in fact, an imposter who killed the real Rachael at the beginning of the semester and assumed her identity, storing the real Rachael's corpse in a garment bag in her dormitory closet. The real Rachael was an orphan; so when Rachael claimed to be her, there was no one to disprove her claim. Daniels and two cops pursue Rachael in a car chase, which ends with Rachael driving off a cliff, resulting in the car exploding. At this point, she is presumed dead.

Two years later, Dr. Daniels is giving a lecture on Rachael's mind and how he wrote a book about her. When he looks up from speaking with a student, he sees Rachael, who has not died after all; she indirectly reveals that she killed Starkman's last assistant, Elizabeth McGuire, and stole her identity to get into Quantico FBI Academy. She allows Dr. Daniels to know because she believes there is no point in committing the perfect crime if no one knows about it and she is confident he will not divulge this information because it would make a farce of his best-selling book in which he claimed to completely understand her and witness her death in the fiery car.

It is revealed the dead body in the car was the real Rachael, whose decaying body had been kept in the killer's dorm closet. It was revealed by another student that Elizabeth is the youngest agent to be drafted to the Bureau in her sophomore year. As Elizabeth aka Rachael walks out of his class, Dr. Daniels is visibly shaken by what he has just learned.

== Cast ==
- Mila Kunis as Rachael Newman, the serial killer, and a student of Professor Starkman's class, seeking to learn everything she can about serial killers.
  - Susan Dalton as the real Rachael Newman
  - Jenna Perry as Young Rachael
- William Shatner as Robert Starkman, a college professor and former FBI agent. He teaches in the Behavioral and Social Sciences department and is Rachael's professor.
- Geraint Wyn Davies as Eric Daniels, the school psychiatrist
- Robin Dunne as Brian Leads, one of Rachael's classmates
- Lindy Booth as Cassandra Blaire, a student in Starkman's class with whom he is having an affair.
- Charles Officer as Keith Lawson
- Michael Kremko as Patrick Bateman, a notorious serial killer
- Kim Poirier as Barbara Brown, a student in Starkman's class who is hoping for a good grade, only to be set aside due to the professor's affair with Cassandra Blaire.
- Kim Schraner as Elizabeth McGuire, Starkman's assistant
- Shoshana Sperling as Gertrude Fleck
- Lynne Deragon as Mrs. Newman
- Philip Williams as Mr. Newman
- Kay Hawtrey as Mrs. Daniels

== Production ==
=== Development ===
The screenplay for the film, entitled The Girl Who Wouldn't Die, originally had no association with Mary Harron's American Psycho (2000). After production began, the script was altered to connect the film with the original.

=== Casting ===
In April 2001, it was announced that Mila Kunis and William Shatner had been cast in the film.

Lionsgate president Michael Paseornek commented on the project: "Morgan J. Freeman is a talented director who we are convinced will make a film that will appeal to audiences from the late teens on up. And Mila Kunis is about to really break out. She has great timing for a dark comedy like this."

=== Filming ===
Filming began in Toronto in May 2001 on a budget of approximately $10 million. The production was noted as having completed in late-June 2001. Bret Easton Ellis, author of the novel American Psycho, expressed confusion about the film's billing as a sequel to Harron's 2000 film adaptation, though he noted at the time that he had sold the rights to the story, commenting: "I've even heard that [Lionsgate] were thinking about doing American Psycho in L.A., American Psycho in Las Vegas, and making a whole franchise out of it."

Marketing

American Psycho 2 catered to the new and increasing demand for DVDs, as evident by the direct-to-disc promotional tool used after the release.

== Release ==
=== Critical response ===
American Psycho 2 was panned by critics. On the review aggregator website Rotten Tomatoes, 23% of 22 critics' reviews are positive, with an average rating of 3.3/10. The website's consensus reads: "Lackluster and ill-conceived, American Psycho 2 ditches its predecessor's clever satire in favor of shallow slasher tropes and unconvincing attempts at dark humor."

Film critic Rob Gonsalves wrote, "American Psycho 2 wasn't even supposed to be an American Psycho sequel, for Christ's sake! Lions Gate noticed that the first film got critical acclaim and didn't do too poorly in theaters, so they dusted off an unrelated script and modified it to link it (tenuously) to the first film." Almar Haflidason of the BBC awarded the film a two out of five star-rating, writing: "Imagine if the characters of the animated series Scooby-Doo were to turn on one another, and you'll be close to imagining the freakish American Psycho II. Resembling a Scream-styled take on serial killer thrillers, this stuck pig of a movie flails limply between bizarre comedy and pallid horror." Entertainment Weekly's Scott Brown similarly criticized the film, writing: "Unscary and unfunny, [it] still manages to inspire homicidal fantasies—most involving the slow dismemberment of once-promising indie director Morgan J. Freeman."

The film was denounced by American Psycho author Bret Easton Ellis the year before its release. In 2005, Kunis expressed embarrassment over the film and spoke out against the idea of a third entry. "Please—somebody stop this", she said. "Write a petition. When I did the second one, I didn't know it would be American Psycho II. It was supposed to be a different project, and it was re-edited, but, ooh … I don't know. Bad."

Chris Alexander of ComingSoon.net defended the film in a 2017 retrospective, deeming it "a strange, entertaining and surprising little film. Bloody and funny and twisty and turny and Kunis pulls it all off. We like Rachel, despite her streak of remorseless and lethal evil. And the men and women who end up on the end of her knives, very often deserve it. Or at least are undone by their own unsavory antics." TV Guide's published review described the film as "occasionally amusing" and compared its structure to that of the similarly themed black comedy Getting In (1994), adding, "this horror lampoon; directed by indie up-and-comer Morgan J. Freeman; blithely ridicules FBI profiling, psychoanalysis and professorial sexual misconduct. It's less successful in its efforts to paint serial killers and their trackers as soul mates, and in the end, this campy chiller crucifies the American success ethic with more vigor than elan."

=== Home media ===
Though intended for a theatrical release, American Psycho 2 was released direct-to-video on VHS and DVD by Lions Gate Home Entertainment on June 18, 2002. DVD extras included a feature commentary with director Freeman, star Kunis, deleted scenes, and a trailer. The film made its Blu-ray debut on September 5, 2017. It includes all of the DVD extras along with a digital copy.
