= The Minnesota Wrecking Crew =

Canadian sketch comedy troupe

The Minnesota Wrecking Crew is a Canadian sketch comedy troupe, featuring members John Catucci, Josh Glover, Mike 'Nug' Nahrgang and Ron Sparks. They all met as members of The Vanier Improv Company. The group won two consecutive Canadian Comedy Awards for Best Sketch Troupe (2003-2004), and were nominated again in 2005 and 2006, making them one of the country's most successful comedy groups.

In 2006 they were featured in the CBC Television special Sketch with Kevin McDonald, hosted by Kevin McDonald of The Kids in the Hall fame, with their performance earning the troupe its third Canadian Comedy Award, in the "Best Taped Live Performance" category.

They are named after the professional wrestling tag team, The Minnesota Wrecking Crew.

The troupe has not performed in years.
