= List of horror television programs =

The following is a list of horror television programs. Programs are listed in chronological order.

== History ==
John Kenneth Muir in his book Terror Television found that most of the American output of horror television programs were more aligned to science fiction with programs like The Outer Limits, fantasy with The Twilight Zone, and crime melodramas with Thriller with only Rod Serling's Night Gallery in the early 1970s being solely horror.

Following World War II, television became the new source of entertainment to replace cinema. Early horror related programs were based on well-established radio programs such as Lights Out and Inner Sanctum. and other popular stories such as The Monkey's Paw , Dr. Jekyll and Mr Hyde and were adapted to Suspense. Dr. Jekyll and Mr Hyde was among the most popular stories adapted, being done in Climax! in 1955 and again in two years by NBC Matinee Theater. Both shows also made adaptations of Frankenstein and Dracula.

Early horror television work did not have the budget for expensive make-up effects or multiple-camera set-ups which led to stories with more psychological plots and character-driven narratives than traditional monsters. Muir found that television only was able to showcase "some of the most grotesque and complex make-up" seen on network television with the arrival of Night Gallery. Boris Karloff adapted to the medium early with series such as Mystery Playhouse Starring Boris Karloff in 1949 and hosting the unsold series The Veil which was a 10-episode series with a mildly supernatural slant. Writer Nigel Kneale also expanded into television in the United Kingdom with his series The Quatermass Experiment, a hybrid of science fiction and horror, for the BBC. The Quatermass Experiment led to other similar serials being made such as The Trollenberg Terror and The Strange World of Planet X both in 1956.

US television began broadcasting horror films late at night in the 1950s. Local stations used horror hosts such as John Zacherle and Ottola Nesmith to introduce movies from a series of 52 films called Shock.

=== 1960s ===
In the early 1960s, there was a short-lived wave of anthology series such as Moment of Fear, Dow Hour of Great Mysteries, Great Ghost Tales, and Tales of Mystery. Comedic material influenced by the Universal Classic Monsters were introduced in 1964 with The Munsters which ran for two years. Along with The Addams Family, the series would later lead to a series of spin-off films, cartoon adaptations and remakes. In the United Kingdom, Mystery and Imagination ran from 1966 to 1970 and featured hour-long adaptions of classic horror stories such as Dracula and Frankenstein. Supernatural themed soap operas also began appearing with Dark Shadows while the Canadian made Strange Paradise tried to emulate the shows format.

=== 1970s ===
In the early 1970s, Rod Serling's program Night Gallery debuted, alongside similar programs such as The Sixth Sense, Ghost Story, The Evil Touch, Orson Welles Great Mysteries. The two television films The Night Stalker and The Night Strangler led the ABC television series Kolchak: The Night Stalker. Other horror related series from the mid-1970s series and specials included The Stone Tape, and short-lived series such as Quatermass, Struck by Lightning, and Supernatural.

=== 1980s ===
"Television has really asked the impossible of its handful of horror programs - to terrify without really terrifying, to horrify without really horrifying, to sell audiences a lot of sizzle and no steak."
—Author Stephen King on television horror in 1980.

In the early 1980s, Hammer Films had their second attempt at television work with Hammer House of Horror, an hour-long anthology show that was later reworked into a format for made-for-television films, known as Hammer House of Mystery and Suspense. Other early series included a pilot for the show Comedy of Horrors in 1981 hosted by Patrick Macnee, Tales of the Haunted hosted by Christopher Lee and Darkroom hosted by James Coburn.

Some television series were adapted from popular film franchises, such as Friday the 13th: The Series which had nothing to do with the film series, but was about an antique store owner trying to recover cursed objects. The late 1980s featured two late anthology series with Tales from the Darkside and Monsters, and Freddy's Nightmares hosted by Robert Englund as Freddy Krueger. Among the longest of these series was HBO's Tales from the Crypt which lasted from 1989 to 1996.

=== 1990s and 2000s ===
Early 1990s horror series were based on classical horror figures such as a blond-haired Count in Dracula: The Series and She-Wolf of London. Series in the 1990s were often either based on their locations such as Shades of LA, Eerie Indiana, and Twin Peaks or focused on vampires with Geraint Wyn Davies playing an undead cop in Forever Knight and the most influential vampire show, Buffy the Vampire Slayer. A spin-off series followed in 1999 with Angel. Series based on popular children's series also grew in popularity with Are You Afraid of the Dark?, Goosebumps and Bone Chillers.

Other series in the 1990s and early 2000s focused on secret societies and groups investigating the supernatural with Poltergeist: The Legacy, Sleepwalkers, The Others and FreakyLinks.

By the 2000s, television was awash with several horror programs. These included British series such as Shockers, Urban Gothic, Dr. Terrible's House of Horrible, The Fear, Spine Chillers, Garth Marenghi's Darkplace. Toward the mid-2000s, Showtime's Masters of Horror was described by Stephen Jones as pushing the envelope for horror on the small screen.

== 1940s – 1960s ==
- Lights Out (1946–1952)
- The Vampira Show (1954–1955)
- Strange Experiences (U.K., 1955-1962)
- Alfred Hitchcock Presents (1955–1965)
- Armchair Theatre (U.K., 1956–1974)
- The Veil (1958)
- 13 Demon Street (Sweden, 1959–1960)
- Alcoa Presents: One Step Beyond (1959–1961)
- The Twilight Zone (1959–1964)
- Thriller (1960–1962)
- Way Out (1961)
- Great Ghost Tales (1961)
- The Outer Limits (1963–1965)
- The Addams Family (1964–1966)
- The Munsters (1964–1966)
- Mystery and Imagination (U.K., 1966–1970)
- Dark Shadows (1966–1971)
- Yōkai Ningen Bem (Japan, 1968–1969)
- Strange Paradise (Canada, 1969–1970)
- Scooby-Doo, Where Are You! (1969–1970, 1978)
- Night Gallery (1969, 1970–1973)

== 1970s ==
- Doomwatch (U.K., 1970–1972)
- Fright Night (1970–1981), hosted horror films
- Groovie Goolies (1970–1971)
- A Ghost Story for Christmas (U.K., 1971–1978)
- Dead of Night (U.K., 1972)
- Devilman (Japan, 1972–1973)
- Ghost Story (1972–1973)
- Thriller (U.K., 1973–1976)
- Dororon Enma-kun (Japan, 1973–1974)
- The Evil Touch (Australia, 1973–1974)
- Fright Night (1973–1987), hosted horror films
- The Addams Family (1973)
- Kolchak: The Night Stalker (1974–1975)
- The Ghost Busters (1975)
- The Ghosts of Motley Hall (U.K., 1976-1978)
- Beasts (U.K., 1976)
- Monster Squad (1976)
- Youkaiden Nekome Kozō (Japan, 1976)
- Quinn Martin's Tales of the Unexpected (1977)
- In Search Of... (1977–1982, 2002)
- Supernatural (U.K., 1977)
- Armchair Thriller (U.K., 1978–1981)
- The Clifton House Mystery (U.K., 1978)
- Tales of the Unexpected (U.K., 1979–1988)

== 1980s ==
- Hammer House of Horror (1980)
- Drak Pack (1980)
- Dingbat and the Creeps (1980)
- Darkroom (1981–1982)
- The Old Miao Myth (1983)
- The Hitchhiker (TV series) (1983–1991)
- Tales from the Darkside (1983, 1984–1988)
- The Ray Bradbury Theater (1985–1992)
- The Twilight Zone (1985 TV series) (1985–1989)
- Alfred Hitchcock Presents (1985–1989)
- Amazing Stories (1985–1987)
- Brivido Giallo (1986)
- The Real Ghostbusters (1986–1991)
- Ghostbusters (1986)
- Friday the 13th: The Series (1987–1990)
- Monsters (1988–1991)
- War of the Worlds (1988–1990)
- Freddy's Nightmares (1988–1990)
- The Munsters Today (1988–1991)
- Count Duckula (1988–1993)
- Tales from the Crypt (1989–1996)
- Werewolf (1987–1988)

== 1990s ==
- Twin Peaks (1990–1991, 2017)
- Swamp Thing (1990–1993)
- Beetlejuice (1990–1992)
- She-Wolf of London (1990–1991)
- Are You Afraid of the Dark? (1990–1996, 1999–2000, 2019)
- Dark Shadows (1991)
- Eerie, Indiana (1991–1992)
- Gravedale High (1991)
- Nightmare Cafe (1992)
- Forever Knight (1992–1996)
- The Addams Family (1992–1993)
- Zee Horror Show (1993–1997)
- The X-Files (1993–2002, 2016–2018)
- Tales from the Cryptkeeper (1993–2000)
- Gargoyles (1994–1997)
- The Kingdom (1994–1997)
- Monster Force (1994)
- Aaahh!!! Real Monsters (1994–1997)
- Chiller (1995)
- American Gothic (1995–1996)
- Aahat (1995–2015)
- Goosebumps (1995–1998)
- Monster Mania (1995-1996)
- The Outer Limits (1995–2002)
- Kindred: The Embraced (1996)
- Poltergeist: The Legacy (1996–1999)
- Bone Chillers (1996)
- Millennium (1996–1999)
- Hell Teacher Nūbē (1996–1997)
- Anveshitha (1997–1999)
- Berserk (1997–1998)
- Beyond Belief: Fact or Fiction (1997–2002)
- Buffy the Vampire Slayer (1997–2003)
- Perversions of Science (1997)
- The Hunger (1997–2000)
- Chock (1997)
- Clive Barker's A-Z of Horror (1997)
- Eko Eko Azarak (1997)
- Ghost Stories (1997–1999)
- Vampire Princess Miyu (1997–1998)
- Extreme Ghostbusters (1997)
- Brimstone (1998–1999)
- Charmed (1998–2006)
- Devil Lady (1998–1999)
- Eerie, Indiana: The Other Dimension (1998)
- Woh (1998)
- Big Wolf on Campus (1999–2002)
- Betterman (1999)
- Blue Gender (1999–2000)
- Gregory Horror Show (1999–2003)
- Pet Shop of Horrors (1999)
- Saturday Suspense (1999–2000)
- Archie's Weird Mysteries (1999–2000)
- Angel (1999–2004)
- Courage the Cowardly Dog (1999–2002)
- Happy Tree Friends (1999–2016)

== 2000s ==
- Boogiepop Phantom (2000)
- Descendants of Darkness (2000)
- The Fearing Mind (2000)
- Ghost Stories (2000–2001)
- Grizzly Tales for Gruesome Kids (2000–2012)
- MPD Psycho (2000)
- Sci-Fi Harry (2000–2001)
- Urban Gothic (2000–2001)
- The Chronicle (2001–2002)
- Dark Realm (2001)
- Witchblade (2001–2002)
- Hellsing (2001–2002)
- Invader Zim (2001–2006)
- Grim & Evil (2001–2002)
- Night Visions (2001)
- The Nightmare Room (2001–2002)
- Wolf Lake (2001–2002)
- The SoulTaker (2001)
- Ssshhhh...Koi Hai (2001–2010)
- The Dead Zone (2002–2007)
- Demon Lord Dante (2002)
- Glory Days (2002)
- The Twilight Zone (2002–2003)
- Haunted (2002)
- Kya Hadsaa Kya Haqeeqat (2002–2004)
- Phantom Investigators (2002)
- La mujer de Judas (2002)
- Tremors (2003)
- Dead Like Me (2003–2004)
- Divergence Eve (2003)
- Death Note (2003–2007)
- Freaky (2003)
- Gilgamesh (2003–2004)
- Mermaid's Forest (2003)
- The Grim Adventures of Billy and Mandy (2003–2008)
- Requiem from the Darkness (2003)
- Shadow Star (2003)
- Carnivàle (2003–2005)
- Unexplained Mysteries (2003–2004)
- Shingetsutan Tsukihime (2003)
- The Wicked and the Damned: A Hundred Tales of Karma (2003)
- Martin Mystery (2003–2005)
- Tutenstein (2003–2008)
- The Collector (2004–2006)
- Eko Eko Azarak -eye- (2004)
- Kingdom Hospital (2004)
- Elfen Lied (2004)
- Danny Phantom (2004–2007)
- Gantz (2004)
- The Great Horror Family (2004)
- Kyaa Kahein (2004–2005)
- Monster (2004–2005)
- Nginiig (2004–2006)
- Paranoia Agent(2004)
- Raat Hone Ko Hai (2004–2005)
- Hex (2004–2005)
- Lost (2004–2010)
- Supernatural (2005–2020)
- Surface (2005–2006)
- Invasion (2005–2006)
- Dante's Cove (2005–2007)
- Garo (2005–2006)
- Hell Girl (2005–2009)
- A Haunting (2005–2007, 2012–2022)
- Lucy, the Daughter of the Devil (2005–2007)
- Masters of Horror (2005–2007)
- Monster Allergy (2005–2009)
- Trinity Blood (2005)
- Ayakashi: Samurai Horror Tales (2006)
- Blade: The Series (2006)
- Nightmares and Dreamscapes: From the Stories of Stephen King (2006)
- Black Blood Brothers (2006)
- Coma (2006)
- Da Adventures of Pedro Penduko (2006–2007)
- Dexter (2006–2013)
- Ghost Hunt (2006–2007)
- Higurashi When They Cry (2006)
- Kemonozume (2006)
- Night Head Genesis (2006)
- Red Garden (2006–2007)
- Tokko (2006)
- Torchwood (2006–2011)
- Yōkai Ningen Bem (2006)
- School for Vampires (2006–2010)
- Young Dracula (2006–2014)
- The Dresden Files (2007)
- Blood Ties (2007)
- Ayakashi (2007–2008)
- Bokurano (2007)
- Devil May Cry: The Animated Series (2007)
- The Fairies of Liaozhai (2007)
- Moonlight (2007–2008)
- Ghost Hound (2007–2008)
- La Vendetta (2007–2008)
- Pedro Penduko at ang mga Engkantao (2007)
- Princess Resurrection (2007)
- Devil May Cry (2007–2009)
- Rental Magica (2007–2008)
- Tokyo Majin (2007)
- Apparitions (2008)
- Being Human (2008–2013)
- Crooked House (2008)
- E.S.P. (2008)
- Fear Itself (2008)
- Maligno (2008)
- Mnemosyne (2008)
- True Blood (2008–2014)
- Mōryō no Hako (2008)
- Patayin Sa Sindak Si Barbara (2008)
- Rosario + Vampire (2008)
- Vampire Knight (2008)
- Yakushiji Ryōko no Kaiki Jikenbo (2008)
- Florinda (2009)
- Harper's Island (2009)
- Kaidan Restaurant (2009–2010)
- Misteryo (2009–2011)
- Nasaan Ka Maruja? (2009)
- Umineko: When They Cry (2009)
- Demons (2009)
- The Vampire Diaries (2009–2017)
- The Haunted (2009–2011)

== 2010s ==
- Happy Town (2010)
- Haven (2010–2015)
- Highschool of the Dead (2010)
- Shiki (2010)
- Lost Girl (2010–2015)
- Todd and the Book of Pure Evil (2010–2012)
- The Haunting Hour: The Series (2010–2014)
- The Walking Dead (2010–2022)
- Becoming Human (2011)
- American Horror Story (2011–present)
- Anhoniyon Ka Andhera (2011)
- La casa de al lado (2011–2012)
- Supernatural: The Anime Series (2011)
- Being Human (2011–2014)
- Blood-C (2011)
- Deadman Wonderland (2011)
- Death Valley (2011)
- The Strange Calls (2011)
- Dororon Enma-kun Meeramera (2011)
- Garo: Makai Senki (2011–2012)
- La Mujer De Judas (2012)
- Gosick (2011)
- Kaala Saaya (2011)
- Teen Wolf (2011–2017)
- The Secret Circle (2011–2012)
- Yōkai Ningen Bem (2011)
- Grimm (2011–2017)
- Black Mirror (2011–2019)
- Femme Fatales (2011–2012)
- Another (2012)
- Bhairavi Aavigalukku Priyamanaval (2012–2017)
- Gravity Falls (2012–2016)
- The River (2012)
- Holliston (2012–2013)
- Btooom! (2012)
- 666 Park Avenue (2012–2013)
- Oka Tokat (2012)
- Shi to Kanojo to Boku (2012)
- Deadtime Stories (2012–2013)
- The Returned (2012–2015)
- Ripper Street (2012–2016)
- Wolfblood (2012–2017)
- Cassandra: Warrior Angel (2013)
- Darknet (2013–2014)
- Ek Thhi Naayka (2013)
- In the Flesh (2013–2014)
- Bates Motel (2013–2017)
- Hannibal (2013–2015)
- Garo: Yami o Terasu Mono (2013)
- Hemlock Grove (2013–2015)
- Sleepy Hollow (2013–2017)
- The Originals (2013–2018)
- Sannata (2013–2014)
- Ravenswood (2013–2014)
- Higanjima (Island of the Equinox) (2013)
- Woh (2013–2014)
- Dracula (2013–2014)
- Pupipō! (2013–2014)
- Yamishibai: Japanese Ghost Stories (2013–present)
- Spooksville (2013–2014)
- Bitten (2014–2016)
- Inside No. 9 (2014–2024)
- From Dusk till Dawn: The Series (2014–2016)
- Garo: Makai no Hana (2014)
- Helix (2014–2015)
- M3: The Dark Metal (2014)
- Salem (2014–2017)
- Parasyte -the maxim- (2014–2015)
- Penny Dreadful (2014–2016)
- Pupa (2014)
- Terra Formars (2014–2018)
- Tokyo Ghoul (2014–2018)
- The Strain (2014–2017)
- In Search of Aliens (2014)
- Intruders (2014)
- Z Nation (2014–2018)
- Constantine (2014–2015)
- Heartless (2014–2015)
- Darr Sabko Lagta Hai (2015–2016)
- Zindagi Abhi Baaki Hai Mere Ghost (2015–2016)
- Fortitude (2015–2018)
- The Returned (2015)
- iZombie (2015–2019)
- Garo: Gold Storm Sho (2015)
- Wayward Pines (2015–2016)
- The Whispers (2015)
- Scream (2015–2019)
- Fear the Walking Dead (2015–2023)
- Scream Queens (2015–2016)
- Scream Street (2015–2017)
- Kagewani (2015–2016)
- Ash vs Evil Dead (2015–2018)
- South of Hell (2015)
- Re-Kan! (2015)
- School-Live! (2015)
- The Haunted House (2016–present)
- Shadowhunters (2016–2019)
- Ajin: Demi-Human (2016)
- Lucifer (2016–2021)
- Slasher (2016–2023)
- Damien (2016)
- Houdini and Doyle (2016)
- Higurashi When They Cry (2016)
- Wynonna Earp (2016–2021)
- Wolf Creek (2016–2017)
- Outcast (2016–2017)
- Preacher (2016–2019)
- BrainDead (2016)
- American Gothic (2016)
- Dead of Summer (2016)
- The Living and the Dead (2016)
- Stranger Things (2016–2025)
- Crow's Blood (2016)
- Van Helsing (2016–2021)
- The Exorcist (2016–2017)
- Aftermath (2016)
- Channel Zero (2016–2018)
- Crazyhead (2016)
- Stan Against Evil (2016–2018)
- Bunnicula (2016–2018)
- Santa Clarita Diet (2017–2019)
- Midnight, Texas (2017–2018)
- The Mist (2017)
- Castlevania (2017–2021)
- The Better Half (2017)
- Mindhunter (2017–2019)
- Hotel Transylvania: The Series (2017–2020)
- Blood Drive (2017)
- Electric Dreams (2017–2018)
- Vampirina (2017–2021)
- Dimension 404 (2017)
- Lore (2017–2018)
- Legend Quest (2017–2019)
- Mr. Mercedes (2017–2019)
- Ghosted (2017–2018)
- Creeped Out (2017–2019)
- The Terror (2018–2019)
- Castle Rock (2018–2019)
- The Purge (2018–2019)
- Chilling Adventures of Sabrina (2018–2020)
- Into the Dark (2018–2021)
- Saaya (2018)
- The Haunting of Hill House (2018)
- The Killer Bride (2019–2020)
- Bandish (2019)
- The Twilight Zone (2019–2020)
- NOS4A2 (2019–2020)
- Victor and Valentino (2019–2022)
- What We Do in the Shadows (2019–2024)
- The Passage (2019)

== 2020s ==
- Amazing Stories (2020)
- The Haunting of Bly Manor (2020)
- 30 Coins (2020–2023)
- Locke & Key (2020–2022)
- Lovecraft Country (2020)
- Monsterland (2020)
- Reality Z (2020–present)
- The Owl House (2020–2023)
- Truth Seekers (2020)
- The Walking Dead: World Beyond (2020–2021)
- I Know What You Did Last Summer (2021)
- American Horror Stories (2021–2024)
- Chucky (2021–2024)
- Yellowjackets (2021–present)
- Stories to Stay Awake (2021–2022)
- Dead End: Paranormal Park (2022)
- Resident Evil (2022)
- Wreck (2022–2024)
- Interview with the Vampire (2022–present)
- Guillermo del Toro's Cabinet of Curiosities (2022)
- Wednesday (2022–present)
- From (2022–present)
- Mayfair Witches (2023–present)
- The Last of Us (2023–present)
- The Curse (2023–2024)
- Grotesquerie (2024–present)
- The Creep Tapes (2024–present)
- Alien: Earth (2025–present)
- Talamasca: The Secret Order (2025–present)
- It: Welcome to Derry (2025–present)
- If Wishes Could Kill (2026)
- Carrie (TBA)
- Widow's Bay (2026)

== Sources ==
- Jones, Stephen (2018) [1st pub. 2006]. "Horror on Television". The Definitive Guide to Horror Movies. London: Carlton Books. ISBN 9781787391390.
- Jowett, Lorna; Abbott, Stacey (2013). TV Horror: Investigating the Darker Side of the Small Screen. Bloomsbury Publishing. ISBN 978-0857724489.
- Muir, John Kenneth (2001). Terror Television: American Series, 1970-1999. McFarland & Company, Inc. ISBN 0-7864-0890-1.
