= List of Forever Knight episodes =

Forever Knight is a Canadian television series created by Barney Cohen and James D. Parriott. The series aired on CBS from 5 May 1992 to 17 May 1996, broadcasting three seasons and a total of 70 episodes. There were no new episodes shown during the entire 1993–94 TV season. The show is an adaptation of a made-for-television film, Nick Knight, which premiered on 20 August 1989. CBS initially declined to option the film for a television series. In the summer of 1992, the series was picked up with all but one of the actors being replaced and the storyline for the film acting as the first two episodes of the series. Forever Knight follows the life of Nick Knight (Geraint Wyn Davies), an 800-year-old vampire who works as a police detective in modern-day Toronto, seeking redemption for the lives he has taken over the years and struggling for a way to become mortal again.

== Series overview ==
Series	Episodes	Originally released	
Series	Episodes	First released	Last released
Television movie		20 August 1989	
1	22	5 May 1992	2 March 1993
2	26	12 September 1994	29 July 1995
3	22	11 September 1995	17 May 1996

== Episodes ==
=== Television movie (1989) ===
Title	Directed by	Written by	Original release date
Nick Knight	Farhad Mann	James D. Parriott & Barney Cohen	20 August 1989

=== Season 1 (1992–93) ===
No. overall	No. in season	Title	Directed by	Written by	Original release date
1	1	"Dark Knight"	Allan Kroeker	James D. Parriott & Barney Cohen	5 May 1992
Night shift Toronto detective Nick Knight and his new partner Don Schanke investigate a serial killer preying on the homeless. Unbeknownst to the police, Nick is really an 800-year-old vampire named Nicholas, "brought across" to the vampire world during the Crusades by LaCroix and his protege Janette. When someone steals a Mayan jade cup used in a vampiric transformation ritual from a local museum, Nick falls for the museum's curator and tries to find something to connect both crimes. Nicole DeBoer (as Nikki DeBoer) guest stars.
2	2	"Dark Knight: The Second Chapter"	Allan Kroeker	James D. Parriott & Barney Cohen	6 May 1992
Nick's search for the jade cup leads him to LaCroix and Nick must choose between saving his newfound love's life or learning a ritual that may make him mortal again.
3	3	"For I Have Sinned"	Jerry Ciccoritti	Philip John Taylor	12 May 1992
Nick and Schanke investigate a series of gruesome crimes against women. When medical examiner Natalie finds crosses on the women's bodies, Nick flashes back to 15th century France where he encountered Joan of Arc (Christina Cox). Linking the crimes to a Catholic parish, Nick attempts to find the killer but is prevented by his aversion to crosses and a priest (Michael McManus) determined to keep confessions sacred.
4	4	"Last Act"	René Bonnière	Brad Wright	19 May 1992
When a doctor commits suicide, the police believe the victim's depression is the cause, but Nick believes not everything is as it seems. Meanwhile, Nick finds out that his one-time lover Erica, a vampire and 17th century playwright, committed suicide through self-immolation in sunlight, causing Nick to reevaluate his own eternal life.
5	5	"Dance by the Light of the Moon"	Michael Levine	Roy Sallows	26 May 1992
Investigating the murder of an accountant and a respected cop, Nick's case leads him to a bewitching stripper (Cynthia Preston) obsessed with death fantasies, causing him to remember how Janette seduced him.
6	6	"Dying to Know You"	Brad Turner	Tony Sheer	9 June 1992
A psychic helps Nick and Schanke locate a philanthropist's kidnapped wife and daughter, but her gifts also give her a troubling peek into Nick's centuries-old past, including an encounter in Puritan-era America with another mild psychic.
7	7	"False Witness"	Jorge Montesi	Naomi Janzen	4 August 1992
Subpoenaed to testify at the daytime murder trial of a police informant, Nick risks perjury or revealing his vampire nature, flashing back to England in 1828 and a similar trial where he witnessed a murder and refused to testify.
8	8	"Cherry Blossoms"	Brad Turner	Roy Sallows	11 August 1992
Caught in an ambush by Chinese mobsters, Nick discovers that an old man (James Hong) protecting a wounded mobster may be related to an attempt he made to cure his vampirism at an acupuncturist in 1916 Chinatown.
9	9	"I Will Repay"	Jorge Montesi	Brad Wright	15 September 1992
When Natalie's brother, a city prosecutor, is shot by a captured suspect at the police station, Natalie pleads with Nick to make him a vampire to save his life. Meanwhile, Nick remembers an incident in an English fishing village centuries ago where he faced a similar dilemma when he rescued a dying leper woman.
10	10	"Dead Air"	Steve DiMarco	Allison Lea Bingeman	22 September 1992
Nick and Schanke are on the hunt for a deranged killer (David Hewlett) who brags about his crimes on a psychiatrist's radio show. Meanwhile, Nick has constant flashbacks to 1440 when he watched LaCroix torture a man for his own ends.
11	11	"Hunters"	Michael Levine	Peter Mitchell	29 September 1992
When someone murders Schanke's old partner, Janette allows Nick to hide Schanke at her nightclub, the Raven, putting Nick in mind of his own escape from vampire hunters with Janette and LaCroix.
12	12	"Dead Issue"	Nicholas J. Gray	Lionel E. Siegel	6 October 1992
Capt. Stonetree becomes involved in a murder case involving his friend, a police inspector, and his wife, suspected of killing her lover in self-defense. While investigating the case, Nick remembers a time in 16th century Italy when he befriended a painter's abused model.
13	13	"Father Figure"	Gary Farmer	Michael Sadowski	13 October 1992
Nick protects a young witness to a mob hit, causing him to remember when he cared for an orphan with his vampire "family" in England during World War II.
14	14	"Spin Doctor"	Leon Marr	Michael Sadowski	27 October 1992
The murder of a muckraking journalist during a mayoral election puts Nick in mind of his trial before the HUAC in the 1950s.
15	15	"Dying for Fame"	Jon Cassar	Shelly Goldstein	10 November 1992
Nick and Schanke investigate a body found in the hotel room of Rebecca, a sensationalist rock star whose latest stage performance involves "killing" her fans.
16	16	"Only the Lonely"	Michael Levine	Susan Martin	17 November 1992
Nick nearly forgets Natalie's birthday, but she remembers her birthday two years ago, when they met for the first time. While searching for a blind date killer, Nick finds out that Natalie is seeing someone new.
17	17	"Unreality TV"	Clay Borris	Michael Sadowski	24 November 1992
A reality television show sets up shop in Capt. Stonetree's department, reminding Nick of the first time he was on camera--during the Civil War. Both then and now, Nick must not let his vampire image be captured.
18	18	"Feeding the Beast"	Richard J. Lewis	Alison Lea Bingeman	1 December 1992
Nick joins a support group for addicts, secretly hoping to manage his addiction to blood, and gains a sponsor, a codependent woman (Carrie-Anne Moss) addicted to love. When members of the group turn up murdered, Nick wonders if his sponsor is to blame.
19	19	"If Looks Could Kill"	Michael Levine	Naomi Janzen	9 February 1993
When a new beauty product causes seemingly normal women to kill, Nick investigates a health spa and its new line of products.
20	20	"Fatal Mistake"	Michael Levine	Michael Sadowski	16 February 1993
Forced to shoot a teenage burglar during a convenience store robbery, Capt. Stonetree has difficulties focusing at work. Nick's empathy runs deep, having been in a similar situation hundreds of years earlier.
21	21	"1966"	Nicholas J. Gray	Brad Wright	23 February 1993
When a murder suspect takes a hostage at the police station, Nick attempts to mediate, and remembers a similar time in East Berlin when he aided a family while searching for an ancient vampire text.
22	22	"Love You to Death"	Michael Levine	Naomi Janzen & Tony Sheer	2 March 1993
While searching for a missing lingerie catalog model, Nick is reminded of a ballerina he fell in love with in the late 19th century because of her purity and innocence.

=== Season 2 (1994–95) ===
Between Seasons 1 and 2, Nick and Schanke change to a new precinct under a new captain but continue to work with Natalie at crime scenes.

No. overall	No. in season	Title	Directed by	Written by	Original release date
23	1	"Killer Instinct"	Michael Levine	Naomi Janzen	12 September 1994
Nick and Schanke hunt for a serial killer on the loose in Toronto, but when Nick is arrested as the prime suspect, he learns that his onetime mentor LaCroix may be behind the crimes.
24	2	"A Fate Worse Than Death"	Don McCutcheon	Gillian Horvath	19 September 1994
Janette requests Nick's help when a friend of hers, a streetwalker, is murdered. Janette's empathy runs deep, having been a prostitute herself in 11th century France.
25	3	"Stranger Than Fiction"	Clay Borris	Larry Lalonde & Phil Bedard	26 September 1994
When a recently published novel gives intimate details about vampires, LaCroix orders Nick to kill the author (Larissa Laskin) but he ends up falling for her.
26	4	"Bad Blood"	Allan Kroeker	James Johnston	7 November 1994
An Interpol detective comes to Toronto to help solve a string of murders in a local park, a detective whose detailed knowledge of vampires makes Nick uncomfortable.
27	5	"Forward into the Past"	Don McCutcheon	Michael Levine & John Scheinfeld	3 October 1994
Forty years ago, Nick helped a female friend (Stephanie Morgenstern) and her secretary disappear after someone murdered her husband. In the present day, Nick discovers that the secretary is dead, and must find his old friend to prevent her murder.
28	6	"Capital Offense"	Timothy Bond	Michael Sadowski	26 November 1994
Nick and Schanke catch a killer (Lisa Langlois) on the run from Texas, but Nick is torn over extraditing her when he believes she is innocent. While investigating her innocence, Nick is reminded of a time when a young French nun sheltered him from pursuers in a convent basement.
29	7	"Hunted"	Allan Kroeker	Roy Sallows	10 October 1994
Nick and Schanke track a hunter preying on other humans (Gwynyth Walsh) who offers two million dollars to anyone who escapes her hunt alive. Meanwhile, Nick remembers back to a time in the 18th century when he, Lacroix, and Janette hunted a vampire hunter.
30	8	"Faithful Followers"	Jon Cassar	Naomi Janzen	17 October 1994
Nick goes undercover as a member of a Scientology-esque sun worshipping cult to find a killer, but Schanke believes that the cult's indoctrination may be working on Nick. Meanwhile, Nick keeps having flashbacks to a time the 1930s when another old vampire invited him to an archaeological dig looking for a cure for vampirism.
31	9	"Undue Process"	Allan Kroeker	Michael Sadowski	31 October 1994
When Natalie's goddaughter is found dead, Nick must protect the suspected murderer from a vigilante mob while Natalie is prohibited from working on the case.
32	10	"Father's Day"	Bruce Pitman	Gillian Horvath	24 October 1994
A mafia don tries to blackmail Nick when the don's grandson tries to hide his family avoid a life a crime. Meanwhile, Schanke tries to answer the question "what is a father?" for his daughter's school assignment.
33	11	"Can't Run, Can't Hide"	Jon Cassar	Ron Taylor	14 November 1994
Nick has flashbacks to his time as a combat medic during the Vietnam War when a parole officer is the prime suspect in the murder of a Vietnam vet.
34	12	"Amateur Night"	Don McCutcheon	Michael Levine & John Scheinfeld	21 January 1995
A movie star famous for playing police roles follows Nick and Schanke as they investigate a series of drive-by shootings. Meanwhile, Nick remembers back to 1960s Chicago and how he used his vampire powers to join the police force.
35	13	"Beyond the Law"	Michael Levine	James Johnston	28 January 1995
While searching for a killer, Nick is stunned to discover that the killer may be a diplomat who is beyond the law's reach. Nick thinks back to the 1960s when a charismatic candidate equally beyond the law used his power to seduce a young woman.
36	14	"The Fix"	Nicholas J. Gray	Michael Sadowski	4 February 1995
While investigating a popular policeman's suicide, Natalie reveals to Nick that she may have found a cure for his vampirism, causing him to think about an attempt a scientist made far earlier to try and cure him.
37	15	"Be My Valentine"	Stefan Scaini	Diane Cary	11 February 1995
While tormenting his protege on the hunt for a Valentine's Day killer, LaCroix remembers a bittersweet lost love, Nick's mortal sister Fleur.
38	16	"The Fire Inside"	Allan Kroeker	Marc Scott Zicree	18 February 1995
While tracking a killer that uses a flamethrower, Nick's fear of fire puts him in mind of his experience hunting a slave-tracker in the southeastern United States.
39	17	"Blood Money"	Geraint Wyn Davies	Jason Brett	25 February 1995
After his personal accountant dies, Nick believes the old man's son isn't a suspect, but when he finds his foundation's coffers empty, Nick suspects foul play.
40	18	"Partners of the Month"	Alan Simmonds	Shelly Goldstein	22 April 1995
Schanke leaves his wife and moves in with Nick. As the two try to adjust to their living conditions, Schanke becomes jealous over Nick's career and becomes determined to catch a computer programmer's killer by himself. Meanwhile Nick thinks about the end of his 98-year relationship with Janette in Renaissance Italy.
41	19	"Queen of Harps"	Alan Simmonds	Gillian Horvath	29 April 1995
When Nick finds a harp at a local auction, he is pleased to discover a link to his mortal life as a papal courier in 13th century Wales. However, when the auctioneer is murdered, Nick is torn between his duty as an officer and his longing for the past.
42	20	"A More Permanent Hell"	John Kapelos	Ron Taylor	6 May 1995
When an astronomer commits suicide, her group's findings are made public: soon a meteor will collide with Earth. As Nick and Schanke search for a killer, humans and vampires all over Toronto come to grips with their probable futures, including LaCroix, who remembers back to Pompeii and how he became a vampire.
43	21	"The Code"	Clay Borris	John Kapelos	13 May 1995
Feeling the winter blues, Schanke disagrees with Nick about the suspects in a string of accidental poisonings case when Schanke's old partner, retired in Arizona, provides his input.
44	22	"Curiouser and Curiouser"	Jon Cassar	Michael Sadowski	20 May 1995
Nick's conscience is in turmoil after his decision to avoid using his supernatural powers when two criminals storm the Raven and cause someone to be killed. (Note: This surreal episode frequently references Lewis Carroll's Alice in Wonderland, including the episode title.)
45	23	"Near Death"	Nicholas J. Gray	Larry Lalonde & Phil Bedard	8 July 1995
Nick and Schanke investigate a doctor's mysterious death. When Nick learns that the doctor was part of a team performing illegal experiments on consciousness and near-death experiences, he becomes hopeful that one of the doctors can cure his vampirism.
46	24	"Baby Baby"	Geraint Wyn Davies	Morrie Ruvinsky	15 July 1995
At a murder scene, Nick meets a vampire he brought across in 1920s Paris who is convinced that the prime suspect's rare XYY chromosomes may hold the key to regaining her mortality.
47	25	"Close Call"	Clay Borris	Michael Sadowski	22 July 1995
In a clip show episode, Schanke investigates Nick's past when he becomes suspicious after Nick hypnotizes him one time too many.
48	26	"Crazy Love"	Don McCutcheon	William Schmidt	29 July 1995
Nick searches for a psychotic serial killer whose bloodlust is a gross parody of his own. Meanwhile Nick thinks back to Renaissance Italy and his own desire to completely possess a merchant's daughter, one who gives her blood willingly to him.

=== Season 3 (1995–96) ===
No. overall	No. in season	Title	Directed by	Written by	Original release date
49	1	"Black Buddha (Part 1)"	Geraint Wyn Davies	James D. Parriot	11 September 1995
When Schanke and Capt. Cohen are killed while traveling by plane to Alberta, Nick considers resigning. However, when the same bomber targets other officers in the precinct, Nick and his new partner, Tracy Vetter, feel obliged to find the bomber.
50	2	"Black Buddha (Part 2)"	Geraint Wyn Davies	James D. Parriot	18 September 1995
While searching for the bomber, Nick meets Tracy's friend Vachon and learns he is a Spanish vampire, formerly a conquistador in life, taking care of Janette's club while she is away. But the bomber's next target forces Nick, Tracy, and Vachon to reconcile with their previous decisions--and lives.
51	3	"Outside the Lines"	Jon Cassar	Roy Sallows	25 September 1995
Nick and Tracy become at odds when Tracy's friend, an undercover cop prone to unwarranted violence, fingers a murder suspect without evidence.
52	4	"Blackwing"	Allan Kroeker	Gillian Horvath	7 October 1995
Nick comes to the defense of a Native American tribe when a man's death is linked to an ongoing land war between the tribe and the state. Much to Natalie's dismay, one member of the tribe convinces Nick of a spiritual way to cure his vampirism.
53	5	"Blind Faith"	Clay Borris	James Johnston	14 October 1995
Nick suspects that a vampiric dog and companion to the department's blind radio dispatcher may be the culprit in a string of vigilante-style murders.
54	6	"My Boyfriend Is a Vampire"	Allan Kroeker	Larry Lalonde & Phil Bedard	21 October 1995
When a guest on a trashy talk show claims that her boyfriend is a vampire, she is found dead. On the trail of the killer, Tracy appears on the show to learn more and puts herself at risk of becoming the killer's next victim.
55	7	"Hearts of Darkness"	Clay Borris	J. Daniel Sexton	28 October 1995
When a patron at the Raven turns up dead in a vampire-like murder, both Nick and Tracy scramble to find the killer and keep the vampiric nature of the crime away from their partner.
56	8	"Trophy Girl"	Terry Steyn	Michael Sadowski	4 November 1995
When the owner of an elite escort service is found dead, Tracy, on leave after shooting a suspect, goes undercover without notice to set a trap for the killer.
57	9	"Let No Man Tear Asunder"	Clay Borris	Diane Cary	11 November 1995
Nick and Tracy investigate a series of surgery-related murders that lead them to an organ harvesting ring, and Nick must prevent Natalie from the same fate after she schedules a knee operation.
58	10	"Night in Question"	Nicholas J. Gray	Gary Stephen Riect	18 November 1995
Nick takes a shot to the head and forgets he is a vampire, an event both Natalie and LaCroix try to use to their own advantage.
59	11	"Sons of Belial"	Clay Borris	Phil Bedard & Larry Lalonde	25 November 1995
Investigating a suicide, Nick learns that the victim believed she was possessed by a demon and receiving help from a former priest. When Nick and Tracy witness the priest perform an exorcism, Nick believes that he himself has been possessed and turns to LaCroix for assistance.
60	12	"Strings"	Don McCutcheon	Roy Sallows	2 December 1995
Nick and Tracy investigate a string of murders with a pop singer--and her controversial therapist--as the only common element. Meanwhile, Tracy considers a promotion and transfer from her father, the city commissioner.
61	13	"Fever"	Alan Simmonds	Gillian Horvath	31 December 1995
A new virus puts the vampire community of Toronto at risk when one of Vachon's henchmen unknowingly drains the blood from an infected rat, causing Nick and Natalie to search for a cure.
62	14	"Dead of Night"	Jon Cassar	Michael Sadowski	TBA
Nick, Tracy, and Natalie come to terms with the ghosts from their pasts while investigating a murder in a haunted house
63	15	"The Games Vampires Play"	Nicholas J. Gray	Naomi Janzen	18 January 1996
As he hunts for the killer of a popular software designer, Nick learns that the dead man was creating a virtual vampire game, one so real that it reawakens Nick's vampire bloodlust.
64	16	"The Human Factor"	Geraint Wyn Davies	Larry Lalonde & Phil Bedard	5 February 1996
Janette reappears in Nick's life when she becomes a murder suspect, but Nick is willing to put everything on the line to help Janette one last time.
65	17	"Avenging Angel"	Alan Simmonds	Alison Lea Bingeman	12 February 1996
Nick and Tracy investigate the death of an abused woman whose daughter, the only witness to the crime, insists that her abusive father is the killer.
66	18	"Fallen Idol"	Geraint Wyn Davies	Gary Stephen Rieck	14 February 1996
When a mentally challenged teenager is the only witness to the murder of a popular wrestler, both Nick and Natalie agree to protect the witness, but while Nick attempts to find the killer, Natalie attempts to "cure" the boy.
67	19	"Jane Doe"	Nicholas J. Gray	Michael Sadowski	27 April 1996
Capt. Reese believes that a recent murder may be the work of a man he helped convict on lesser charges as a lieutenant. Meanwhile, the murderer plays a wicked game of cat-and-mouse with the police department.
68	20	"Francesca"	Nigel Bennett	Gillian Horvath	3 May 1996
Nick recognizes a killing spree as the work of Francesca, a lovely but troubled woman he knew long ago.
69	21	"Ashes to Ashes"	Jon Cassar	Larry Lalonde & Phil Bedard	11 May 1996
A murderer targets vampires in Toronto and LaCroix is the ultimate target. Forced to team up with his reviled creator, Nick learns how LaCroix was made a vampire and the killer's connection to LaCroix.
70	22	"Last Knight"	Geraint Wyn Davies	Michael Sadowski	17 May 1996
After two long-time friends commit suicide and another is killed in the line of duty, Natalie becomes suicidally depressed and Nick nearly gives up hope on ever becoming mortal. When Natalie pressures Nick into finding answers, both Nick and Natalie make decisions that will have far-reaching implications in both of their lives.
