= Power Play (1998 TV series) =

- Created by: Glenn Davis; William Laurin
- Starring: Michael Riley; Kari Matchett; Dean McDermott; Caterina Scorsone; Gordon Pinsent
- Opening theme: "The Hockey Song" performed by Stompin' Tom Connors
- Country of origin: Canada
- Original language: English
- No. of seasons: 2
- No. of episodes: 26

Production
- Executive producers: Glenn Davis; Robert Lantos
- Camera setup: Multi-camera
- Running time: 44 minutes
- Production companies: CTV Originals; N.D.G Productions; Serendipity Point Films; Alliance Atlantis

Original release
- Network: CTV
- Release: October 15, 1998 – February 17, 2000

Power Play is a Canadian television drama series, which aired on CTV from 1998 to 2000. The series was filmed at Copps Coliseum (now TD Coliseum) in Hamilton, Ontario.

The show starred Michael Riley as Brett Parker, a former New York City sports agent who became the general manager of a (fictional) National Hockey League franchise, the Hamilton Steelheads.

One of the throughline plots of the series dealt with Parker's ongoing love–hate relationships with the sport, the team and his superior at McArdle Industries, corporate executive Colleen Blessed, played by Kari Matchett.

The cast also included Gordon Pinsent as team owner Duff McArdle, Jonathan Crombie, Jennifer Dale and Al Waxman. The show's theme song was a modernized version of the Stompin' Tom Connors classic, "The Hockey Song", performed partly by Connors himself, and then transitioning to the performance of the band Rusty.

The show was briefly aired on the United States broadcast network UPN, starting in 1999, but was pulled after two episodes. The second episode aired in the United States has the distinction of being the lowest-rated episode (since the Nielsen ratings service began in the 1950s) of any prime-time TV series ever aired by any United States network.

== Cast ==
=== Main ===
- Michael Riley as Brett Parker
- Kari Matchett as Colleen Blessed
- Dean McDermott as Mark Simpson
- Caterina Scorsone as Michelle Parker
- Gordon Pinsent as Duff McArdle

=== Recurring ===
- Jonathan Rannells as Todd Maplethorpe
- Mark Lutz as Jukka Branny-Acke
- Krista Bridges as Rose Thorton
- Normand Bissonnette as Al Tremblay
- Lori Anne Alter as Renata D'Allesandro
- Greg Spottiswood as Joe Harriman
- Al Waxman as Lloyd Gorman
- Johanna Black as Andrea Stuyvesant
- Neil Crone as Harry Strand
- Jonathan Crombie as Hudson James
- Fiona Highet as Rayanne Simpson
- David Keeley as Bud Travis
- Jennifer Dale as Samantha Robbins
- Don Cherry as Jake Nelson
- Tanja Jacobs as SM3 Reagan Sexsmith
- Chris Tessaro as Marshak
- Rob Faulds as Play-by-Play Announcer
- Sean McCann as Ray Malone

== All-time Hamilton Steelheads roster ==
The following players have been seen playing for the Steelheads over the course of the series:

- 1 Tremblay
- 1 McCloud
- 2 Banks
- 3 Kudlow
- 4 Borden
- 7 Schmöckel
- 9 Simpson
- 10 Wynn
- 12 Sauvé
- 13 Bränny-Acke
- 14 Marshak
- 16 Lalonde
- 18 Grant
- 22 Maplethorpe
- 23 Dee
- 24 Stephanovic
- 25 St. Germaine
- 26 Pacelli
- 28 Chartraw
- 29 Alexander: D. Parent
- 30 MacDougall
- 32 Shipton
- 37 Ignarson
- 40 Zinoviev
- 44 Bedard
- 48 McNally
- 55 Gunn
- 75 Kerensky
- 75 Robinson

== Episodes ==
=== Season 1 (1998–99) ===
No. overall	No. in season	Title	Directed by	Written by	Original release date
1	1	"Perambulate Me Back to My Habitual Abode"	John Fawcett	Glenn Davis & William Laurin	October 15, 1998 (Canada); June 14, 1999 (UPN)
2	2	"Changing the Luck"	Penelope Buitenhuis	Paul Quarrington	October 22, 1998 (Canada); June 21, 1999 (UPN)
3	3	"All for One"	Don McBrearty	Sharon Corder & Jack Blum	October 29, 1998
4	4	"Seventh Game"	John Fawcett	Julie Lacey	November 12, 1998
5	5	"Off Season"	Graeme Lynch	Paul Quarrington	November 19, 1998
6	6	"Brothers in Arms"	Don McBrearty	Sharon Corder & Jack Blum	November 26, 1998
7	7	"The Bad Boy"	John Fawcett	Julie Lacey	December 3, 1998
8	8	"Purple Hazing"	Jeff Woolnough	Story by : Phil Bedard & Larry Lalonde; Teleplay by : Glenn Davis & William Laurin	January 6, 1999
9	9	"Family Values"	John Fawcett	Steven Barwin & Gabriel David Tick	January 13, 1999
10	10	"Pucks the Size of Beach Balls"	TW Peacocke	Phil Bedard & Larry Lalonde	January 20, 1999
11	11	"High Noon"	Glenn Davis	Paul Quarrington	February 3, 1999
12	12	"Dire Straits"	Richard J. Lewis	Sharon Corder & Jack Blum	February 10, 1999
13	13	"Waked at the Forum"	David Wu	William Laurin & Paul Quarrington	February 17, 1999

=== Season 2: 1999–2000 ===
No. overall	No. in season	Title	Directed by	Written by	Original air date
14	1	"Everything Is Broken"	David Wu	Glenn Davis & William Laurin	October 15, 1999
15	2	"Resign or Re-Sign"	Richard J. Lewis	Sharon Corder & Jack Blum	October 22, 1999
16	3	"Manipulation"	Geraint Wyn Davies	Paul Quarrington	October 29, 1999
17	4	"Evasion"	Glenn Davis	Julie Lacey	November 12, 1999
18	5	"Temptation"	Ken Girotti	Glenn Davis & William Laurin	November 19, 1999
19	6	"The Truth"	Peter D. Marshall	Rhonda Olson	December 2, 1999
20	7	"The Jumper"	David Wu	Paul Quarrington	December 9, 1999
21	8	"The Mask"	Geraint Wyn Davies	Sharon Corder & Jack Blum	December 16, 1999
22	9	"Foolish Hearts"	David Wu	Julie Lacey	January 13, 2000
23	10	"The Quarter Finals"	Bert Kish	Glenn Davis & William Laurin	January 20, 2000
24	11	"The Cubicle"	David Wu	Paul Quarrington	February 3, 2000
25	12	"The Finals"	Glenn Davis	Glenn Davis & William Laurin & Paul Quarrington	February 10, 2000
26	13	"What It All Meant"	David Wu	Glenn Davis & William Laurin	February 17, 2000
