= Dracula: The Series =

- Developed by: Glenn Davis; William Laurin
- Starring: Bernard Behrens; Geordie Johnson; Joe Roncetti; Jacob Tierney; Mia Kirshner
- Countries of origin: Canada; United States
- No. of seasons: 1
- No. of episodes: 21

Production
- Executive producers: David J. Patterson; Robert Halmi, Jr.
- Running time: 22 minutes per episode
- Production companies: Cinexus-Famous Players; RHI Entertainment; Blair Entertainment; Action Media Group

Original release
- Network: Syndicated
- Release: September 29, 1990 – May 11, 1991

Dracula: The Series is a syndicated series about Count Dracula, and was broadcast from September 29, 1990, to May 11, 1991.

== Plot ==
Count Dracula is using the alias of "Alexander Lucard", and is a wealthy tycoon. (The name 'A. Lucard' is 'Dracula' spelled backwards). He is constantly on guard against attacks from Gustav Van Helsing, as well as Gustav's young nephews — Maximilian and Christopher Townsend. They were also aided by a schoolgirl, Sophie Metternich. Romantic tensions developed between Chris and Sophie.

The series formula was relatively straightforward, with the four heroes learning of some plot by Lucard/Dracula and attempting to foil it, with at least some success. In keeping with Bram Stoker's 1897 novel, but not most film and television lore, vampires could walk in sunlight but lacked their powers. Anyone bitten just once by a vampire transformed into a zombie-like servant. This process could be stopped by applying holy water to the bite.

== Cast ==
=== Main cast ===
- Bernard Behrens as Gustav Helsing
- Geordie Johnson as Alexander Lucard/Count Dracula
- Mia Kirshner as Sophie Metternich
- Joe Roncetti as Christopher Townsend
- Jacob Tierney as Max Townsend

=== Guest cast ===
Guest stars for the show were a cross-section of Canadian television and theatre talent, including Geraint Wyn Davies, who played Gustav's son Klaus, who had been turned into a vampire. He went on to play the vampire Nick Knight in the series Forever Knight. Other notables included Stratford and Shaw festival veteran Jonathan Welsh, well known television and film actors Kim Coates (from Prison Break) and Barry Morse (from The Fugitive and Space: 1999), Chas Lawther, Kirsten Kieferle (from Degrassi: The Next Generation), and Marina Anderson-Carradine, best known for managing (and then marrying) actor David Carradine.

== Production ==
The series was filmed in Luxembourg, and produced by Phil Bedard and Larry Lalonde, best known for their work on John Woo's Once a Thief and Kung Fu: The Legend Continues.

== Episodes ==
| No. | Title | Directed by | Written by | Original release date |
|---|---|---|---|---|
| 1 | "Children of the Night" | Allan Eastman | Glenn Davis & William Laurin | September 29, 1990 |
Two American brothers, Max and Chris, are left behind in Europe with their eccentric uncle Gustav while their mother, Eileen (Lynne Cormack) travels on business. Max, an enthusiast of the supernatural, is positive that his uncle is a vampire and goes to see multimillionaire Alexander Lucard for help. Little does he know that the rich businessman is hiding a secret of his own...
| 2 | "Double Cross" | Allan Eastman | Phil Bedard & Larry Lalonde | October 6, 1990 |
Gustav's old friends, Peter and Anna Dyson (John Gilbert and Dawn Greenhalgh), visit for a short time while Max takes the Cross of the Magyars—an artifact which prevents vampires from entering—from the house to be blessed. When Lucard finds out the cross has been removed, it is a race to see whether the cross can be replaced before Lucard pays the household a visit; but how did he find out that it was gone?
| 3 | "The Vampire Solution" | Allan Eastman | Peter Meech | October 13, 1990 |
Gustav and one of his former students (Jonathan Welsh) find a rare herb and develop a formula which they hope will reverse the effects of a vampire's bite. To test it, Gustav lets himself be captured and bitten by Lucard, unaware that the formula accidentally switched with a protein drink Max made for himself.
| 4 | "The Boffin" | Allan Eastman | Glenn Davis & William Laurin | October 20, 1990 |
Max brings home a bungling vampire-hunting scientist (Patrick Monckton) who insists that a new laser gun he's developed can destroy vampires. Unfortunately, his "anti-vampire gun" is being sponsored by Lucard.
| 5 | "Double Darkness" | Randy Bradshaw | Stu Woolley | October 27, 1990 |
An archeologist (Laurie Paton) uncovers the resting place of Lucard's ancient and bitter rival, Nosferatu (Denis Forest).
| 6 | "Black Sheep" | Allan Eastman | Phil Bedard & Larry Lalonde | November 3, 1990 |
An aggrieved husband (Michael Fletcher) asks Gustav to kill Klaus (Geraint Wyn Davies), the vampire who has taken his wife. Gustav, however, is unwilling to do so, because he has a different plan in mind for Klaus...
| 7 | "What a Pleasant Surprise!" | Allan Eastman | Glenn Davis & William Laurin | November 10, 1990 |
Gustav becomes curious when Lucard buys an old worthless movie theatre.
| 8 | "Damsel in Distress" | René Bonnière | Phil Bedard & Larry Lalonde | November 17, 1990 |
Eileen is doing business with Lucard; in fact, she's going to have dinner with him at the castle.
| 9 | "Mind Over Matter" | Allan Eastman | Glenn Davis & William Laurin | November 24, 1990 |
Gustav appears on a TV talk show to debunk a zany psychic (Chas Lawther). Also, Max is sure he's discovered the resting place of Dracula and that he can therefore destroy him.
| 10 | "A Little Nightmare Music" | René Bonnière | Sean Kelly | December 1, 1990 |
Encouraged by Uncle Gustav, Chris decides to take his rock music to a live audience. Meanwhile, Sophie becomes a guide to an influential Contessa (Gina Wilkinson) who has business dealings with Lucard.
| 11 | "Get a Job" | Allan King | Glenn Davis & William Laurin | December 8, 1990 |
Chris lands a job with a local art house, run by a lovely art dealer named Julia (Louise Vallance), who also happens to have dealings with Alexander Lucard.
| 12 | "The Great Tickler" | Allan King | Glenn Davis & William Laurin | December 15, 1990 |
Lucard invites Mycroft Tickler (Harry Hill), a lounge performer with delusions of grandeur, to give a recital at his castle.
| 13 | "Bad Blood" | Randy Bradshaw | Phil Bedard & Larry Lalonde | January 19, 1991 |
Lucard bites Vincent (Michael de Sadeleer, a young thief with a rare antigen in his blood which can kill the vampire who ingests it.
| 14 | "Sophie, Queen of the Night" | Allan King | Peter Meech | January 26, 1991 |
Following her romance with Vincent, Sophie herself has been turned into a vampire, and is serving an apprenticeship with Lucard.
| 15 | "My Girlfriend's Back and There's Gonna Be Trouble" | Jeff Woolnough | Jack Blum & Sharon Corder | February 2, 1991 |
Having been rescued by Chris, Sophie is about to fall for him, but his old girlfriend Alexa (Tamara Gorski) turns up from Philadelphia.
| 16 | "My Fair Vampire" | Michael Sloan | Phil Bedard & Larry Lalonde | February 9, 1991 |
Gustav's best friend (Barry Morse) claims that people at his old age home are being killed by a vampire.
| 17 | "The Decline of the Romanian Vampire" | Jeff Woolnough | Glenn Davis & William Laurin | February 16, 1991 |
Max inadvertently frees Klaus from the Helsing family crypt.
| 18 | "I Love Lucard" | Allan Kroeker | Stu Woolley | February 23, 1991 |
An old love from Lucard's past (Kate Trotter) comes back into his life.
| 19 | "Bats in the Attic" | René Bonnière | Pascal Bonniere | April 27, 1991 |
Max meets a rather Norman Bates-ish neurotic bookseller (Jack Blum) who has a peculiar interest in vampires.
| 20 | "My Dinner with Lucard" | René Bonnière | Phil Bedard & Larry Lalonde | May 4, 1991 |
Gustav and the kids go to dinner at Lucard's castle.
| 21 | "Klaus Encounters of the Interred Kind" | Allan Kroeker | Glenn Davis & William Laurin | May 11, 1991 |
Gustav has a new theory about vampires and wants to use his new discovery as a way to reclaim Klaus and make him human once more.

== See also ==
- Vampire film
- List of vampire television series
