= 1966 (disambiguation) =

1966 was a common year starting on Saturday of the Gregorian calendar.

1966 may also refer to:

- 1966 (number)
- "1966" (Forever Knight)
- "1966" (Our Friends in the North)
