= The Funny Farm (film) =

- Directed by: Ron Clark
- Written by: Ron Clark
- Produced by: Claude Héroux
- Starring: Miles Chapin; Peter Aykroyd; Howie Mandel; Tracy Bregman; Jack Blum; Maurice LaMarche; Mike MacDonald; Derek McGrath; Jack Carter; Eileen Brennan; Gene Clark; Marjorie Gross; Howard Busgang; Alan Riven; Lou Dinos; Tony Mollsworth; Briane Nasimok; Mark Breslin; Steve Allen
- Cinematography: René Verzier
- Edited by: Marcus Manton
- Music by: Pierre Brousseau
- Production companies: Filmplan International, Canadian Film Development Corporation
- Distributed by: New World Pictures, Mutal
- Release date: February 18, 1983 (Winnipeg)
- Running time: 94 minutes
- Country: Canada
- Language: English

The Funny Farm is a 1983 Canadian comedy drama film directed and written by Ron Clark. The film follows a stand-up comedian from Cleveland who joins others struggling at a woman's Los Angeles comedy club.

The film was made in 1981, but not released until 1983.

== Cast ==
- Miles Chapin as Mark Champlin, a stand-up comedian from Cleveland
- Peter Aykroyd as Stephen Croft
- Howie Mandel as Larry
- Tracy Bregman as Amy
- Jack Blum as Peter
- Maurice LaMarche as Dickie
- Mike MacDonald as Bruce
- Derek McGrath as Harvey
- Jack Carter as Philly Beekman
- Eileen Brennan as Gail, a woman who owns a comedy club in Los Angeles
- Gene Clark as Myles
- Marjorie Gross as Tracy
- Howard Busgang as Sammy
- Alan Riven as Michael
- Lou Dinos as Miguel
- Tony Mollsworth as Greg
- Briane Nasimok as Fred
- Mark Breslin as Paul

Additionally, Steve Allen appears in the film.
