= Sharon Corder =

Sharon Corder is an American writer, producer, and educator based in Toronto, Ontario, Canada. With her husband Jack Blum, she has written and produced more than fifty hours of television drama for both Canadian and American broadcasters. In 2005, Blum and Corder began Reel Canada, their non-profit organization dedicated to celebrating Canadian film.

== Biography ==
=== Early life and education ===
Born in Waco, Texas into a military family, Corder moved across the American Southwest according to her father's deployments, including Hawaii and Japan. She trained in theatre at the University of California, Davis.

=== Career ===
In the mid-1970s, Corder moved to Vancouver to pursue a theatrical career. There, she founded the Genesis Company Theatre, playing leading roles as an actor in travelling productions across Canada. In 1985, she met and began working with Jack Blum, who would become her co-writer and co-producer on Canadian television series like Traders, Catwalk, and Power Play.

In 1998, Corder and Blum wrote and produced Babyface, which premiered at the Director’s Fortnight in Cannes.

=== Charity work ===
In 2005, Corder and Blum founded Reel Canada, an educational program entitled "Our Films in Our Schools" aimed at promoting Canadian film in high schools. The initiative has since spawned "Welcome to Canada," a Canadian film summit for newcomers to Canada, and "National Canadian Film Day," a one-day country-wide celebration of Canadian film with local screening partners in every province and territory. Corder is the Artistic Director of Reel Canada.

== Filmography ==
=== Movies ===
Year	Title	Role	Notes
1985	The Hospital (short)	Writer	
1986	Jack of Hearts (short)	Writer	
1987	Street Justice	Reporter	
1988	The Outside Chance of Maximilian Glick	Sarah Glick	
1989	Speaking Parts	Hotel Manager (voice)	
1993	Small Pleasures	Script Editor	
1997	The Sweet Hereafter	Special Thanks	
1998	Babyface	Joyce, Producer, Writer	
2002	Ararat	Special Thanks	
2008	Adoration	Passenger, Professor On-Line	

=== Television ===
Year	Title	Role	Notes
1989	The Twilight Zone (1985)	Technician	1 Episode: The Wall
1989	Alfred Hitchcock Presents	Writer	1 Episode: Mirror Mirror
1990-91	Dracula: The Series	Writer	
1990-92	Max Glick	Writer	1 Episode: The Matchmaker
1990-94	Top Cops	Writer	2 episodes
1992-94	Catwalk	Story Editor	
1995	Kung Fu: The Legend Continues	Writer	1 Episode: Deadly Fashion
1996	Traders	Co-Producer, Writer	13 episodes: The Enemy Without, The Big Picture, Sharper than a Serpent's Tooth, The Enemy Within, Rumours, Into That Good Night, Dancing with Mr. D, From Russia with Love, ...Long Live the King, The King is Dead..., Bad is Good, Pennies from Heaven, Options
1997-98	Once a Thief	Writer	2 episodes: Little Sister, Mac Daddy
1998-99	Power Play	Writer	5 episodes: The Mask, Resign or Re-Sign, Dire Straits, Brothers in Arms, All for One

== Awards ==
Getting Out: Dora Mavor Moore Award for Artistic Excellence and Theatrical Innovation
