= Claire Lautier =

American actress (born 1969)

- Born: December 31, 1969 (age 56); Pensacola, Florida, United States
- Occupation: actress
- Years active: 1999–2012
- Spouse: Geraint Wyn Davies (m. 2011)

Claire Lautier (born December 31, 1969) is an American former actress currently working as a consultant.

== Early life ==
Lautier was born in Pensacola, Florida, on December 31, 1969. She attended Gulf Breeze High School where she joined the drama program and was mentored by Margie Timmons. She then attended Duke University in Durham, North Carolina, where she double majored in French and Drama and graduated magna cum laude with a Bachelor of Arts.

== Career ==
Lautier is well known for playing news anchor Charlotte Dennon in Elf who has since become a fan favourite. She has also appeared in films such as Confessions of a Shopaholic and Margarita. Lautier revealed that early on in her career she struggled with shame, anxiety, negative self-talk and low self-esteem which led her to go on a "7-year spiritual journey". She also has her own podcast call the Grace Space where she helps listeners feel the resonance of truth and create a deeper dimension of Being. She has worked alongside Karta Satyavrati Singh and Mary Morrissey. She currently lives in France where she runs her own yoga studio.

== Personal life ==
Lautier is married to Welsh actor Geraint Wyn Davies. They met while they were performing in Cyrano de Bergerac (play) at the Lincoln Center.
