= Reel Canada =

Reel Canada (stylized as REEL CANADA) is a non-profit organization based in Toronto dedicated to the presentation of Canadian films in Canadian schools. It is the organization behind National Canadian Film Day, an event in April, inaugurated in 2014.

== History ==
Reel Canada was founded in 2005 by Jack Blum and Sharon Corder along with a committee of filmmakers and other prominent members of the Canadian film and TV industry, including Colm Feore and Atom Egoyan. The organization was conceived as a way to engage young people in Canadian arts and culture and build an audience for Canadian film by bringing those films to high school classrooms. To date, the organization has held over 1000 screenings across the country, expanding to include ESL screenings to new Canadians through a program called "Welcome to Canada" and National Canadian Film Day.

== National Canadian Film Day ==
Beginning in 2014 and held every April, National Canadian Film Day is an effort to promote Canadian film across Canada through synchronized screenings, events, and panel discussions. The inaugural event, held April 29, 2014, was officially recognized in the House of Commons of Canada. The 2017 edition, a special sesquicentennial celebration, is on April 19, 2017. In 2019, the organization held the sixth annual National Canadian Film Day (NCFD) celebrating 100 years of Canadian cinema, with more than 1,000 events held in 600 Canadian communities and 25 countries.

Due to the COVID-19 pandemic in Canada, the 2020 edition of National Canadian Film Day was staged online, including film screenings on various streaming video on demand platforms and television channels, and a four-hour livestreamed broadcast featuring interviews with Canadian actors and filmmakers. The hosts of the livestream, Ali Hassan and Peter Keleghan, received a Canadian Screen Award nomination for Best Host in a Web Program or Series at the 9th Canadian Screen Awards in 2021.

In 2022, for the first time a National Canadian Film Day event was held outside Canada, with professor Brad Warren and his Canadian wife Tanja organizing a screening of the films Indian Horse, My Internship in Canada (Guibord s'en va-t-en guerre), The Red Violin and Bon Cop, Bad Cop at Coastal Carolina University in Conway, South Carolina.
