= The American Embassy =

American drama television series

- Genre: Drama
- Created by: James D. Parriott
- Starring: Arija Bareikis; Eric Dane; Reiko Aylesworth; David Cubitt
- Theme music composer: Peter Himmelman
- Composers: Danny Lux; Mader
- Country of origin: United States
- Original language: English
- No. of seasons: 1
- No. of episodes: 4 + 2 unaired

Production
- Executive producers: Danny DeVito; John Landgraf; James D. Parriott; Stacey Sher; Michael Shamberg
- Producer: Kip Koenig
- Cinematography: Andy Collins; James Welland
- Camera setup: Single-camera
- Running time: 45–48 minutes
- Production companies: Jersey Television; 20th Century Fox Television

Original release
- Network: Fox
- Release: March 11 – April 1, 2002

The American Embassy is an American drama television series that aired on Fox from March 11 to April 1, 2002. The series was executive produced by James D. Parriott and Danny DeVito and produced by Jersey Television and 20th Century Fox Television.

== Synopsis ==
The series follows the personal and professional life of Emma Brody (played by Arija Bareikis), a young woman from the United States who entered the U.S. Foreign Service to get away from her dysfunctional life in Toledo, Ohio. Assigned to the U.S. Embassy in London as a vice consul, she is faced with new dilemmas that arise out of the challenging work of a Foreign Service Officer, as well as the personal issues that caused her to seek out the job in the first place.

The show was broadcast in 2002 and touched on many sensitive issues regarding terrorism and post-9/11 American foreign policy. One episode was dedicated to the effects of racial profiling in which British and American personnel investigate a London mosque. Another episode touched on the effects of terrorist attacks after the embassy is hit by a car bomb. Lighter storylines focused on Brody's relationship with her London roommate, her younger sister in America, CIA agent Doug Roach, and Brody's budding romance with a British Lord.

== Cast ==
- Arija Bareikis as Emma Brody
- David Cubitt as Doug Roach
- Jonathan Cake as Jack Wellington
- Helen Carey as Janet Westerman
- Jonathan Adams as Elque Polk
- Michael Cerveris as Gary Forbush
- Davenia McFadden as Carmen Jones
- Reiko Aylesworth as Liz Shoop
- Nicholas Irons as James Wellington

== Episodes ==
No.	Title	Directed by	Written by	Original release date	Prod. code
1	"Pilot"	Andy Tennant	James D. Parriott	March 11, 2002	1AEW79
2	"China Cup"	Stephen Surjik	James D. Parriott	March 18, 2002	1AEW01
3	"Driven"	John Coles	Michael Sardo	March 25, 2002	1AEW02
4	"Long Live the King"	Stephen Surjik	Kip Koenig	April 1, 2002	1AEW03
5	"Agent Provocateur"	TBD	Molly Newman	Unaired	1AEW04
6	"Walking on the Moon"	TBD	James D. Parriott	Unaired	1AEW05

== Cancellation ==
The show was canceled by Fox after 4 episodes were broadcast. A total of six episodes were produced, and all six episodes were aired by the Seven Network in Australia. Although both set and filmed in Britain, the series has never aired in the United Kingdom.
