= Nick Knight (Forever Knight) =

- Forever Knight character
- First appearance: 20 August 1989
- Last appearance: 17 May 1996
- Created by: James D. Parriott and Barney Cohen
- Portrayed by: Rick Springfield (film); Geraint Wyn Davies (TV series)

In-universe information
- Alias: Nicholas de Brabant
- Species: Human vampire
- Gender: Male
- Occupation: Homicide detective

Nick Knight (born Nicholas de Brabant) is the main character of the Canadian television series Forever Knight, and its precursor 1989 television movie Nick Knight. He also appears in three novels, A Stirring of Dust by Susan Sizemore, Intimations of Mortality by Susan M. Garrett, and These Our Revels by Anne Hathaway Nayne.

The character's backstory is revealed piecemeal, primarily through the flashback scenes that appear in most episodes of the television series. He was born circa A.D. 1200; and, in many episodes, employs the name "Nicolas de Brabant", suggesting that he comes from the Duchy of Brabant in the Low Countries. He was born of a noble family, and trained as a knight. After being falsely accused of murder, he chose to fight in the Crusades to escape nearly certain conviction. On his return to Europe in A.D. 1228, he was seduced by a vampire in disguise, Janette DuCharme, who introduced him to her master, Lucien LaCroix. LaCroix offered Knight immortality, which he accepted, becoming a vampire. After spending centuries hunting and killing to sustain himself, Knight rejected the vampire lifestyle, and became a homicide detective in the Metropolitan Police in order to redeem himself.

Knight was played by Australian actor Rick Springfield in the movie, and by Welsh actor Geraint Wyn Davies in the series.

== Fictional biography ==
=== Early life ===
Nick Knight was born Nicholas de Brabant, of a noble family from the Duchy of Brabant circa A.D. 1200. Trained as a knight under Sir Raymond DeLabarre, he was sent to Wales on behalf of the Roman Catholic Church to investigate pagan activities. While there, he fell in love with a Welsh noblewoman, Gwyneth. DeLabarre killed Gwyneth in order to quell a pending pagan revolt, and blamed Knight for her death. Knight was offered to fight in the Crusades instead of facing a trial he could not win, and accepted the offer. After several years spent in the Holy Land, Knight returned to Europe in A.D. 1228, disillusioned and embittered, and became a drunkard.

While drunk, he meets Janette DuCharme, who intrigues him with the lure of immortality. She then introduces him to Lucien LaCroix, and Knight discovers that Janette and LaCroix are vampires and wanted to "bring him across" (make him a vampire). LaCroix tempts him with the prospect of having eternal life and youth as well as power beyond his imagination, and Knight accepts. Nicholas is brought to the catacombs of Paris for his first "feeding", in which Nicholas must kill a mortal for their blood. After some brief hesitation, Knight kills the first of what would become many victims, and fully embraces life as a vampire.

Although it is never mentioned in any episode, writer James D. Parriott said that he wrote a backstory explaining the reasons for this disillusionment. In this backstory, Knight was captured by Muslims and spent several years being tortured in prison. This caused him to lose faith in God, and left him vulnerable to suggestion by Janette and LaCroix.

=== As a vampire ===
Upon becoming a vampire, Knight gained several supernatural abilities and weaknesses, many commonly associated with vampires, and some original to the series.

As a vampire, Knight possess enhanced senses; infrared vision, enhanced hearing, superhuman strength, preternatural speed and agility, is able to regenerate critical wounds over small amounts of time, and is able to fly. His body is also very resilient to the elements, being immune to the effects of cold, poison, illnesses and diseases, and his heart beats only three times per 10 minutes. One of his most useful powers is the ability to perform hypnosis on some, but not all people (those able to resist hypnosis are known as resisters), which will help several times during his work with the Metropolitan Toronto Police. Amongst his weakness are a deadly aversion to sunlight, violent allergic reactions to foods (but not all liquids), an allergy to smelling garlic, a compulsion to look away from Holy objects and religious symbols, and coming into contact with crucifixes and holy water will cause his flesh to burn. Like others vampires in fiction, Knight is immortal, he does not physically age beyond the point of his vampire transformation nor is he vulnerable to the effects of old age or natural death, but can be killed by exposure to sunlight, having a wooden stake driven through his heart, fire, or decapitation.

Knight appears human in normal circumstances, although he rarely perspires – and when he does, he does not perspire sweat, but rather blood – and his skin is cold to the touch. Knight will reveal his vampire traits when threatened, or when becoming aggressive. This is known as vamping out by the fans of the series, but it is never referred as such during the series. When taking a vampire aspect, Knight's eyes turn yellow, and bares the stereotypical vampire fangs. Amongst the common vampire traits found in fiction, Knight does not possess the ability to shapeshift into a bat, and is not inclined to sleep in a coffin. He also does not lose any of his vampire abilities upon at dawn, although exposure to sunlight is still fatal.

In the Forever Knight universe, vampires rarely stay more than a few years in one place in order to keep their true identities concealed. He thus engages in centuries of killings and murders accompanied by Janette and LaCroix. Janette and Knight were lovers, but Janette ended it; while Knight was initially devastated, he eventually accepted her decision and remain on good terms with her. After centuries of indiscriminate killing, Knight started to feel guilt and resolves to only kill those who deserved death. He also has regrets over his choice to become a vampire, and desires to regain his mortality and humanity. Knight will spend most of the Forever Knight series trying to find a way to become human once again. This is met with amusement from other vampires, but LaCroix finds these thoughts unacceptable; this difference of opinions will be the source of great conflicts between the two over the span of the entire series.

Over the series Knight is seen with several historical figures such as Joan of Arc, Arthur Conan Doyle, Ludwig van Beethoven, Jack the Ripper, Grigori Rasputin and Adolf Hitler. LaCroix and Knight, being bonded by blood, also share a psychic bond and are able to sense each other over short distances, and predisposes Knight to Lacroix's suggestions (it does not make him his mental slave however). His long life also allowed him to master several languages in addition to his native French – Cantonese, English, German, Italian, Latin, Mandarin Chinese, Russian, Spanish and Vietnamese.

=== Police career ===
By 1992, Nick had re-established himself in Toronto, Canada, and works for the Metropolitan Toronto Police as Homicide Detective Nicholas (Nick) Knight as a way to seek penance and atone for his past behaviour. While he still fights his hunger for human blood, Knight has not killed anyone for blood in the last 100 years, and now subsists on cow blood instead. His policing work also allows him to reconnect with human society.

His superior officer, Captain Joseph Stonetree, initially had misgivings about Knight, but tolerated him because he turned out to be an excellent detective. Originally, Knight worked alone, but was eventually partnered with Detective Donald Schanke, his polar opposite in terms of personality and approach to police work, but of equal competence. The two initially butted heads, but came to respect and trust each other, essentially becoming bona fide "buddy cops". The duo also worked with Dr. Natalie Lambert, a coroner.

Lambert is one of the few persons who discovered the true identity of Knight during the series – after a bomb explosion injures Knight, she finds him without any injury, and catches him drinking the blood samples in her lab. Nick tried to hypnotize her, but fails as she is one of the "resisters". Lambert is fascinated by his nature, and agrees to both keep his identity a secret, and help him regain his humanity.

In Toronto, Nick would meet both LaCroix and Janette. He tries to destroy LaCroix by driving a flaming stake through his heart, but LaCroix manages to escape permanent death through means which are never revealed. LaCroix and Knight reach an uneasy truce, where LaCroix stops trying to actively thwart Knight's plan to become mortal again, but still tries to convince Nick to embrace his vampire nature as he once did. Knight also re-establishes a friendship with Janette, who now runs a nightclub, called The Raven, which is frequented by both humans and vampires.

After the death of Donald Schanke in a plane accident, Nick is teamed up with Tracy Vetter, a recently promoted and capable detective who is often willing to take risks in order to prove herself. Like Schanke, Vetter was unaware that Nick was a vampire, but she was aware of the existence of vampires, having become friends with Javier Vachon, a member of the Toronto vampire community who was acquainted with Nick. Nick knew of Vetter's knowledge of both Vachon and vampires, but refused to reveal his own vampiric nature to her.

=== End of series ===
In the last half of the final season, Nick began to lose ground in his quest for humanity. Natalie, who was developing strong romantic feelings for Nick grew impatient at Nick's lack of progress. On one night, Nick tried to hypnotize a suspect, but the trance was broken and a firefight occurred. The suspect shot Nick, but the bullets went through him and hit Tracy instead. Nick killed the suspect while displayed his vampire features, to a shocked Tracy who displayed disappointment that Nick never trusted her with this secret.

Tracy is rushed to the hospital, but she was in critical condition and Nick considered turning her into a vampire, feeling guilty for what happened. Natalie chastises Nick for being willing to bring Tracy over, while he always refused her. Nick decides against, and Tracy dies from her wounds. In the same evening, Nick stops by The Raven to find LaCroix closing the club, explaining it was time for him to move on as the investigation of the night's event will expose him as a vampire, and will leave Toronto with or without Nick. Nick wishes to move on, but Natalie doesn't want him to leave and insists that Nick bring her across. Nick reluctantly agrees.

Nick however tries to become human by drinking Natalie's blood, as Janette did. However, he draws too much blood and is forced to either complete the process, bringing Natalie over, or let her die. Not able to condemn Natalie to a life as a vampire, he decides to let her die and take his own life as well, reasoning that he will be reunited with her in the afterlife, and that God would forgive his many sins. Nick realizes that LaCroix had been his best friend in all these years, and hands LaCroix a wooden stake.

LaCroix raises the stake, and the camera focuses elsewhere, leaving the final fate of Nick deliberately ambiguous to allow for the series to be picked up and continued.
