= List of Terra Formars episodes =

Terra Formars is a Japanese manga series. An anime adaptation of the series began in Japan on September 26, 2014, and ran for 13 episodes, concluding on December 19, 2014. Two OVAs set before the main television series were also released, in August and November 2014. The opening theme is "AMAZING BREAK" by TERRASPEX while the ending theme is "Lightning" by TERRASPEX. The second season's first opening theme from episodes 1–4, 7, 10, and 12 is "Kouryoutaru Shinsekai" (荒涼たる新世界) by Seikima-II. The second opening theme from episodes 5–6, 8–9, 11, and 13 is "PLANET / THE HELL" by Seikima-II. The first ending theme from episodes 1-3 and 9 is "Red Zone" by Zwei. The second ending theme from 4-5 and 7-8 is "Strength" by Fuki. The third ending theme from episodes 6 and 10-12 is "Revolution" by nao.

== OVAs ==
No.	Title	Original air date
1	"00-01 THE ENCOUNTER"; Transliteration: "THE ENCOUNTER Kichi to no Sōgū" (Japanese: THE ENCOUNTER 既知との遭遇)	August 19, 2014
2	"00-02 UNDEFEATED"; Transliteration: "UNDEFEATED Yaburezaru Monotachi" (Japanese: UNDEFEATED 敗れざる者たち)	November 19, 2014

== Episode list ==
=== Terra Formars ===
No.	Title	Original air date (Note: Tokyo MX uses an after-midnight schedule so the first episode was advertised for September 26 at 24:30 which is the same as September 27, 2014 at 12:30 am.)
1	"Symptom: Mutation"; Transliteration: "SYMPTOM Hen'i" (Japanese: SYMPTOM 変異)	September 26, 2014
2	"Departure: For the Front"; Transliteration: "DEPARTURE Shutsujin" (Japanese: DEPARTURE 出陣)	October 3, 2014
3	"To Mars: To the Planet of Calamity"; Transliteration: "TO MARS Wazawai no Hoshi e" (Japanese: TO MARS 災いの星へ)	October 10, 2014
4	"War: All-Out War"; Transliteration: "WAR Zenmen Sensō" (Japanese: WAR 全面戦争)	October 17, 2014
5	"Exceptional Two: The Miracle Child"; Transliteration: "EXCEPTIONAL TWO Kiseki no ko" (Japanese: EXCEPTIONAL TWO 奇跡の子)	October 24, 2014
6	"2 Minutes"; Transliteration: "2 MINUTES 2-Funkan" (Japanese: 2 MINUTES 2分間)	October 31, 2014
7	"Crab: Brave Warrior"; Transliteration: "Crab Mōshi" (Japanese: CRAB 猛士)	November 7, 2014
8	"Der Zitteraal: The Electric Organism"; Transliteration: "DER ZITTERAAL Dengeki Seibutsu" (Japanese: DER ZITTERAAL 電撃生物)	November 14, 2014
9	"Too Sad to Die: A Single Drop From a Thunderstorm"; Transliteration: "TOO SAD TO DIE Raiu no Hitotsubu" (Japanese: TOO SAD TO DIE 雷雨の一粒)	November 21, 2014
10	"Desire: Wish"; Transliteration: "DESIRE Negai" (Japanese: DESIRE 願い)	November 28, 2014
11	"Boxer"; Transliteration: "BOXER Bokusā" (Japanese: BOXER ボクサー)	December 5, 2014
12	"Shooting Star: On Track and Reckless"; Transliteration: "SHOOTING STAR Kidō to mukidō" (Japanese: SHOOTING STAR 軌道と無軌道)	December 12, 2014
13	"Terra For Mars: This Way and That Way"; Transliteration: "TERRA FOR MARS Kanata to Konata" (Japanese: TERRA FOR MARS 彼方と此方)	December 19, 2014

=== Terra Formars: Revenge ===
No.	Title	Original release date
1	"2nd Generation: The Special Two"; Transliteration: "2ND GENERATION Tokubetsuna Futari" (Japanese: 2ND GENERATION 特別な二人)	April 1, 2016
2	"The Enraged Children: Century of Raising Arms"; Transliteration: "CENTURY OF RAISING ARMS Ikari no Kanchō" (Japanese: CENTURY OF RAISING ARMS 怒りの艦長)	April 8, 2016
3	"Friend Here: An Alliance Appears"; Transliteration: "FRIEND HERE Dōmei Kenzan" (Japanese: FRIEND HERE 同盟見参)	April 15, 2016
4	"Triple Combat: Three-Way"; Transliteration: "Triple Combat: Mitsudomoe" (Japanese: TRIPLE COMBAT 三つ巴)	April 22, 2016
5	"Man on a Mission: Soldier and Father"; Transliteration: "Man on a Mission: Heishi to Chichioya" (Japanese: MAN ON A MISSION 兵士と父親)	April 29, 2016
6	"Strategy and Tactics: Weapons and Techniques"; Transliteration: "Strategy and Tactics: Buki to Jutsu" (Japanese: STRATEGY AND TACTICS 武器と術)	May 6, 2016
7	"Happy Birthday: First Day"; Transliteration: "Happy Birthday: Saisho no Ichinichi" (Japanese: HAPPY BIRTHDAY 最初の一日)	May 13, 2016
8	"Web of Bend: Hunter's Net"; Transliteration: "Web of Bend: Ryoushi no Ami" (Japanese: WEB OF BEND 猟師の網)	May 20, 2016
9	"The Foremost: Top Ranking"; Transliteration: "The Foremost: Shui" (Japanese: THE FOREMOST 首位)	May 27, 2016
10	"No Place to Hide: Colony"; Transliteration: "No Place to Hide: Guntai" (Japanese: NO PLACE TO HIDE 群体)	June 3, 2016
11	"Silence or Violence: Silent Fists"; Transliteration: "Silence or Violence: Fugen no Ken" (Japanese: SILENCE OR VIOLENCE 不言の拳)	June 10, 2016
12	"Strength or Weakest - The Soul of The Weakest"; Transliteration: "Strength of Weakest: Motazaru Mono no Tamashii" (Japanese: STRENGTH OF WEAKEST 持たざる者の魂)	June 17, 2016
13	"The 12 Seconds - 12 Second Revolution"; Transliteration: "The 12 Seconds: 12 Byou no Kakumei" (Japanese: THE 12 SECONDS 12秒の革命)	June 24, 2016

== Terra Formars: Earth Arc (OVA) ==
No.	Title	Original release date
1	"Born to be Guardian: A Reason to Fight"; Transliteration: "BORN TO BE GUARDIAN Tatakau Riyū" (Japanese: BORN TO BE GUARDIAN 戦う理由)	August 17, 2018
2	"The life of Invoking"; Transliteration: "THE LIFE OF INVOKING Ai Seibutsu-tachi" (Japanese: THE LIFE OF INVOKING 哀・生物たち)	November 19, 2018
