= Briane Nasimok =

Canadian writer, actor, and director

Briane Nasimok is a Canadian writer, actor, and director and storyteller. Currently taking his new one person show "Recovering Romantic" to the Halifax Fringe Festival, for the past decade he has been telling stories, both online and in person, across the United States. In 2020 he shared the Hamilton Fringe stage with Izzy Ferguson in the two-man storytelling show "Izzy and the Naz". In 2021 his new show "Now Where Was I?" premiered at the Ottawa Fringe, virtually of course.

Nasimok appeared in films such as Gas, Funny Farm, Tulips, Ticket to Heaven and Hi-Ballin, before turning to a career as a television writer and producer.

== Biography ==
Nasimok graduated from the University of Toronto and began his career appearing with the Canadian Opera Company in non-singing roles. He later toured North America as the Other Servant in Così fan tutte, and the Head Waiter in La Boheme, performing 287 times without singing. Later, he performed the non-singing role Ambrogio in The Barber of Seville at the Royal Alexandra Theatre in Toronto before his retirement. His one-person show "Confessions of an Operatic Mute", premiered at the Toronto SouloTheatre Festival in 2013 and played that summer at Totnes England Theatre Festival.

In 2014, the hour-long version played at the Toronto and Winnipeg Fringe Theatre Festivals, followed by a tour which took the show to Halifax, Nova Scotia, Victoria, B.C. and Hamilton Ontario

He wrote for the Toronto Star and the Toronto Sun and was responsible for the guide book Making Out in Toronto (1980).

As a freelancer for United Press International, he covered the Toronto Blue Jays for ten years, including their back to back World Series wins.

Nasimok was the second feature act at Yuk Yuks Komedy Kabaret and appeared on A&E's "Evening at the Improv" and Showtime's "Spectacular Evening in Canada". He then moved to Theatresports Toronto and was a member of the 1993 Canadian Championship Team.

His theatre credits include "Dead Air" at the Charlottetown. In addition, Nasimok was the founder and artistic director of the Grafton Street Dinner Theatre in Halifax, Nova Scotia.

Nasimok created NBA Dunk Street, Don't Lick the Pig and produced Uh Oh!, and Nanalan' while writing for the YTV Achievement Awards and YAA to the M@x.

For six years he co-hosted and co-produced a monthly stortelling series "But That's Another Story".
