= List of Tokyo Ghoul episodes =

Tokyo Ghoul is an anime television series produced by Pierrot based on Sui Ishida's manga series of the same name. The first season aired from July to September 2014. A second season, titled Tokyo Ghoul √A, aired from January to March 2015. A third and final season, titled Tokyo Ghoul:re, aired from April to December 2018 in two split season cours. Pierrot also produced two OVAs, each based on Tokyo Ghoul: Jack and a portion of the light novel Tokyo Ghoul: Days, titled Tokyo Ghoul: Pinto.

== Series overview ==
Season	Episodes		Originally released		
Season	Episodes		First released	Last released	Network
1	12		July 4, 2014	September 19, 2014	Tokyo MX
2	12		January 9, 2015	March 27, 2015	Tokyo MX
3	24	12	April 3, 2018	June 19, 2018	BS11
3	24	12	October 9, 2018	December 25, 2018	BS11

== Episodes ==
=== Season 1 (2014) ===
No. overall	No. in season	Title (Note: English translated titles are taken from Crunchyroll.)	Directed by (Note: Information is taken from the ending credits of each episode.)	Storyboarded by	Original release date	English air date
1	1	"Tragedy"; Transliteration: "Higeki" (Japanese: 悲劇)	Shuhei Morita	Shuhei Morita	July 4, 2014	March 26, 2017
2	2	"Incubation"; Transliteration: "Fuka" (Japanese: 孵化)	Shin Matsuo	Shin Matsuo	July 11, 2014	April 2, 2017
3	3	"Dove"; Transliteration: "Shirohato" (Japanese: 白鳩)	Sōichi Shimada	Sōichi Shimada	July 18, 2014	April 9, 2017
4	4	"Supper"; Transliteration: "Bansan" (Japanese: 晩餐)	Tadahito Matsubayashi	Tadahito Matsubayashi	July 25, 2014	April 23, 2017 (Note: Due to special scheduling, Tokyo Ghoul did not air on the night of April 15–16, 2017.)
5	5	"Scars"; Transliteration: "Zankon" (Japanese: 残痕)	Yoshiaki Kyougoku	Yoshiaki Kyougoku	August 1, 2014	April 30, 2017
6	6	"Cloudburst"; Transliteration: "Shūu" (Japanese: 驟雨)	Sōichi Shimada	Sōichi Shimada	August 8, 2014	May 7, 2017
7	7	"Captivity"; Transliteration: "Yūshū" (Japanese: 幽囚)	Tadahito Matsubayashi	Tadahito Matsubayashi	August 15, 2014	May 14, 2017
8	8	"Circular"; Transliteration: "Enkan" (Japanese: 円環)	Shin Matsuo	Shin Matsuo	August 22, 2014	May 21, 2017
9	9	"Birdcage"; Transliteration: "Torikago" (Japanese: 鳥籠)	Yoshiaki Kyougoku	Yoshiaki Kyougoku	August 29, 2014	June 4, 2017 (Note: Adult Swim showed a Samurai Jack marathon on May 27–28, 2017.)
10	10	"Aogiri" (Japanese: 青桐)	Tadahito Matsubayashi	Tadahito Matsubayashi	September 5, 2014	June 11, 2017
11	11	"High Spirits"; Transliteration: "Shōten" (Japanese: 衝天)	Shin Matsuo	Shin Matsuo	September 12, 2014	June 18, 2017
12	12	"Ghoul"; Transliteration: "Kushu" (Japanese: 喰種)	Shuhei Morita	Shuhei Morita	September 19, 2014	June 25, 2017

=== Season 2: √A (2015) ===
No. overall	No. in season	Title	Directed by	Storyboarded by	Original release date	English air date
13	1	"New Surge"; Transliteration: "Shinkō" (Japanese: 新洸)	Shin Matsuo	Shin Matsuo	January 9, 2015	July 9, 2017
14	2	"Dancing Flowers"; Transliteration: "Buka" (Japanese: 舞花)	Tadahito Matsubayashi	Tadahito Matsubayashi	January 16, 2015	July 16, 2017
15	3	"Hangman"; Transliteration: "Tsurushibito" (Japanese: 吊人)	Yoshiaki Kyougoku	Yoshiaki Kyougoku	January 23, 2015	July 23, 2017
16	4	"Deeper Layers"; Transliteration: "Shinsō" (Japanese: 深層)	Yoriyasu Kogawa	Yoriyasu Kogawa	January 30, 2015	July 30, 2017
17	5	"Rift"; Transliteration: "Sakeme" (Japanese: 裂目)	Yoshifumi Sueda	Yoshifumi Sueda	February 6, 2015	August 6, 2017
18	6	"Thousand Paths"; Transliteration: "Senro" (Japanese: 千路)	Tadahito Matsubayashi	Tadahito Matsubayashi	February 13, 2015	August 13, 2017
19	7	"Permeation"; Transliteration: "Tōka" (Japanese: 透過)	Sōichi Shimada	Sōichi Shimada	February 20, 2015	August 20, 2017
20	8	"Old Nines"; Transliteration: "Kyūkyū" (Japanese: 旧九)	Yoriyasu Kogawa	Yoriyasu Kogawa	February 27, 2015	August 27, 2017
21	9	"City In Waiting"; Transliteration: "Gaibō" (Japanese: 街望)	Yoshiaki Kyougoku	Yoshiaki Kyougoku	March 6, 2015	September 10, 2017 (Note: Adult Swim showed a Dragon Ball Z Kai marathon on September 2–3, 2017.)
22	10	"Last Rain"; Transliteration: "Shūu" (Japanese: 終雨)	Shin Matsuo	Shin Matsuo	March 13, 2015	September 17, 2017
23	11	"Deluge of Flowers"; Transliteration: "Itsuka" (Japanese: 溢花)	Sōichi Shimada	Sōichi Shimada	March 20, 2015	September 24, 2017
24	12	"Ken" (Japanese: 研)	Shuhei Morita	Shuhei Morita	March 27, 2015	October 1, 2017

=== Season 3: re (2018) ===
No. overall	No. in season	Title	Directed by	Original release date
Part 1
25	1	"START: Those Who Hunt"; Transliteration: "Karu Monotachi: Sutāto" (Japanese: 狩る者たち START)	Toshinori Watanabe	April 3, 2018
26	2	"member: Fragments"; Transliteration: "Kakera: Menbā" (Japanese: 欠片 member)	Toshinori Watanabe	April 10, 2018
27	3	"fresh: Eve"; Transliteration: "Zen'yasai: Furesshu" (Japanese: 前夜祭 fresh)	Taiji Kawanishi	April 17, 2018
28	4	"MAIN: Auction"; Transliteration: "Ōkushon: Mēn" (Japanese: オークション MAIN)	So Toyama	April 24, 2018
29	5	"PresS: Night of Scattering"; Transliteration: "Chiri Yuku Yoru: Puresu" (Japanese: 散りゆく夜 Press)	Toshinori Watanabe	May 1, 2018
30	6	"turn: In the End"; Transliteration: "Sono, Hate ni: Tān" (Japanese: その、果てに turn)	Masayuki Matsumoto	May 8, 2018
31	7	"mind: Days of Recollections"; Transliteration: "Kokorooboe Arishi Hibi: Maindo" (Japanese: 心覚え在りし日々 mind)	Toshinori Watanabe	May 15, 2018
32	8	"TAKe: One Who Writhes"; Transliteration: "Ugomeku Mono: Tēku" (Japanese: 蠢くモノ TAKe)	Taiji Kawanishi	May 22, 2018
33	9	"play: Ghost"; Transliteration: "Bōrei: Purē" (Japanese: 亡霊 play)	Toshinori Watanabe	May 29, 2018
34	10	"think: Sway"; Transliteration: "Yureru: Shinku" (Japanese: ゆれる think)	Masayuki Matsumoto	June 5, 2018
35	11	"writE: The Absent One"; Transliteration: "Ketsuraku-sha: Raito" (Japanese: 欠落者 writE)	Toshinori Watanabe	June 12, 2018
36	12	"Beautiful Dream: Dawn"; Transliteration: "Yoake: Byūtifuru Dorīmu" (Japanese: 夜明け Beautiful Dream)	Toshinori Watanabe	June 19, 2018
Part 2
37	13	"Place: And So, Once Again"; Transliteration: "Soshite, Mōichido: Purēsu" (Japanese: そして、もう一度 Place)	Taiji Kawanishi	September 29, 2018 (GyaO! screening); October 9, 2018
38	14	"VOLT: White Darkness"; Transliteration: "Shiroi Yami: Bōruto" (Japanese: 白い闇 VOLT)	Taiji Kawanishi	October 16, 2018
39	15	"union: Cross Game"; Transliteration: "Kurosu Gēmu: Yunion" (Japanese: クロスゲーム union)	Masayuki Matsumoto	October 23, 2018
40	16	"vive: Those Left Behind"; Transliteration: "Nokoshita Mono: Bību" (Japanese: 遺したもの vive)	Hye Jin Seo	October 30, 2018
41	17	"MovE: Confluence, Confusion"; Transliteration: "Deai, Tomadoi: Mūbu" (Japanese: 出会い、とまどい MovE)	Toru Yoshida	November 6, 2018
42	18	"FACE: Effulgence"; Transliteration: "Kakukakutaru: Fēsu" (Japanese: 赫赫たる FACE)	Taiji Kawanishi	November 13, 2018
43	19	"proof: Bonds"; Transliteration: "Kizuna: Purūfu" (Japanese: 紲 proof)	Hiroaki Kudō	November 20, 2018
44	20	"incarnation: Awakened Child"; Transliteration: "Mezameta ko: Inkānēshon" (Japanese: めざめた子 incarnation)	Masayuki Matsumoto	November 27, 2018
45	21	"Morse: Remembrances"; Transliteration: "Kokorooboe: Mōsu" (Japanese: 心覚え Morse)	Mitsuhiro Yoneda	December 4, 2018
46	22	"call: The Far Side of Tragedy"; Transliteration: "Higeki no Hate: Kōru" (Japanese: 悲劇の果て call)	Hye Jin Seo, Toshinori Watanabe	December 11, 2018
47	23	"ACT: Encounters"; Transliteration: "Kaigō: Akuto" (Japanese: 邂逅 ACT)	Toshinori Watanabe	December 18, 2018
48	24	"The Final Episode (Note: This episode does not have an official title in Japan, however Crunchyroll lists this as the title in its release.)"	Toshinori Watanabe	December 25, 2018

=== OVAs ===
No.	Title	Release date
1	"Tokyo Ghoul: Jack"; Transliteration: "Tōkyō Gūru: Jakku" (Japanese: 東京喰種(トーキョーグール) [JACK])	September 30, 2015
The story features a serious young Special Investigator Kishou Arima at high school where he first meets the carefree Taishi Fura who joins him in hunting ghouls in the 13th ward. Later, they both become Special Investigators in the CCG, but retain their original opposite attitudes.
2	"Tokyo Ghoul: Pinto"; Transliteration: "Tōkyō Gūru: Pintō" (Japanese: 東京喰種(トーキョーグール) [PINTO])	December 25, 2015
The story features Shuu Tsukiyama the "Gourmet" during his high school years and Chie Hori. They meet when she photographs Tsukiyama killing a jogger and then about to eat him because of the tone of his body. She being uninterested anything that takes her interest.
