= Nick Knight (film) =

- Genre: Horror
- Written by: Barney Cohen; James D. Parriott
- Directed by: Farhad Mann
- Starring: Rick Springfield
- Music by: Joseph Conlan
- Country of origin: United States
- Original language: English

Production
- Executive producers: Barry J. Weitz; Roberta Becker Ziegel
- Producer: S. Michael Formica
- Production locations: Vasquez Rocks Natural Area Park; Los Angeles
- Cinematography: Frank Beascoechea
- Editor: Benjamin A. Weissman
- Running time: 92 minutes
- Production companies: Barry Weitz Films; Robirdie Pictures; New World Television

Original release
- Network: CBS
- Release: August 20, 1989

Nick Knight is a 1989 American television film about Nick Knight, a centuries-old vampire working as a police detective in modern-day Los Angeles.

Originally meant to be a pilot episode for a television series, it was not picked up at the time. However, in 1992, CBS picked up the series but produced the show in Canada as Forever Knight, re-filming the pilot (with the same plot) and using a completely different cast, except for John Kapelos.

== Cast ==
- Rick Springfield as Nick Knight
- John Kapelos as Don Schanke
- Robert Harper as Dr. Jack Brittington
- Richard Fancy as Capt. Brunetti
- Laura Johnson as Dr. Alyce Hunter
- Craig Richard Nelson as Fenner
- Fran Ryan as Jeannie
- Cec Verrell as Janette
- Jack Murdock as Topper
- Michael Nader as Lacroix
- Irene Miracle as The Nurse
- Gregory Wagrowski as Detective Jessell
- Davis Roberts as Dr. Dave
- Al Fann as Dedrick

== See also ==
- Vampire film
