= John Kapelos =

Canadian actor (born 1956)

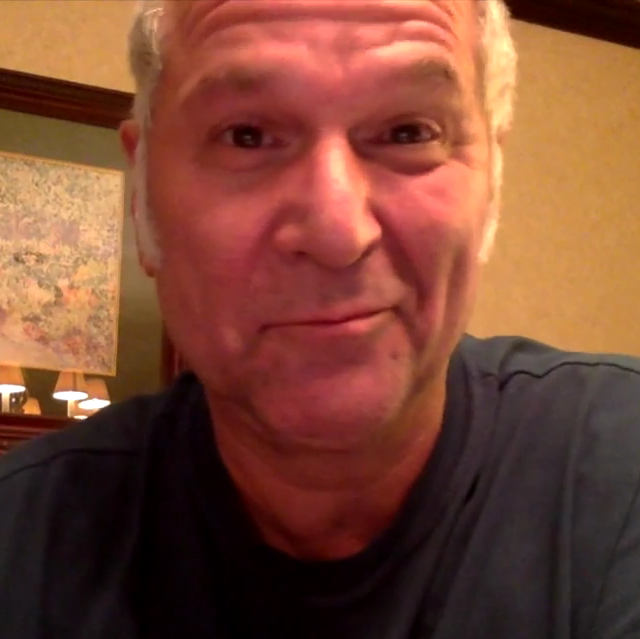
- Kapelos in 2014
- Born: March 8, 1956 (age 70); London, Ontario, Canada
- Occupation: Actor
- Years active: 1981–present

John Kapelos (born March 8, 1956) is a Canadian actor. He is best known for his portrayals of janitor Carl Reed in The Breakfast Club and Detective Donald Schanke in Forever Knight.

An alumnus of The Second City, Chicago, Kapelos's theatrical work spans eight years from Second City's Touring Company (1978–1982) to six revues as a member of the famed Resident Company (1982–1986), and finally Second City's critically acclaimed return to off-Broadway in Orwell That Ends Well at the former Village Gate in New York City.

== Career ==
Kapelos' work in film includes appearances in three John Hughes films, Sixteen Candles, The Breakfast Club, and Weird Science, which all earned him notice in the 1980s as a character actor. He also appeared in 1999's The Deep End of the Ocean, which received praise from both The New York Times and Roger Ebert from The Chicago Sun Times.

Other film appearances include Schepisi's Roxanne, with Steve Martin and Daryl Hannah, and Garry Marshall's Nothing in Common, opposite Tom Hanks, and Touchstone’s Stick It. While he has often appeared in comedies, several roles, including The Boost, with James Woods, and Internal Affairs with Richard Gere, have been dramatic roles.

On television, Kapelos has appeared in numerous shows. Those appearances include Miami Vice as a corrupt public defender, Desperate Housewives, Queer as Folk, The X-Files, Seinfeld, Home Improvement, Dead Like Me, ER, Boston Legal and Justified. He also played a security guard in a 2010 episode of the television series Nikita, filmed at the University of Toronto. More recently, he has appeared in a recurring role on Days of Our Lives.

Kapelos also guest teaches at the AIA Studios focusing on improv/acting workshops; produced a four-part series on YouTube featuring monologues by NPR-contributor Michael Raysses called Greek to Me, and manages an independent record label called Carpuzi Records, which has produced sound recordings featuring him and some of the Second City alumni, such as Dan Castellaneta.

== Selected filmography ==
=== Film ===
Year	Title	Role	Notes
1981	Thief	Mechanic #3	
1982	Tootsie	Actor at Party	Uncredited
1983	Doctor Detroit	Rush Street Dude	
1983	Class	Bellman	
1984	Sixteen Candles	Rudy	
1984	The Naked Face	Frank	
1985	The Breakfast Club	Carl the janitor	
1985	Weird Science	Dino	
1985	My Man Adam	Mr. Rangle	
1985	Head Office	General Sepulveda	
1986	Ferris Bueller's Day Off	Cab driver	Scene deleted
1986	Off Beat	Lou Wareham	
1986	Nothing in Common	Roger the Commercial Director	
1987	Roxanne	Chuck	
1988	Vibes	Eugene	
1988	The Boost	Joel Miller	
1989	All's Fair	Eddie	
1990	Internal Affairs	Steven Arrocas	
1991	Defenseless	Jack Hammer	
1992	We're Talkin' Serious Money	Marty 'the Greek'	
1992	Man Trouble	Detective Melvenos	
1993	Guilty as Sin	Ed Lombardo	
1994	The Shadow	Duke Rollins	
1996	The Craft	Ray	uncredited
1996	The Late Shift	Robert Morton	
1997	The Relic	McNally	
1998	Johnny Skidmarks	Walter Lippinscott	
1999	The Deep End of the Ocean	George Karras	
1999	Blood Type	ER Policeman	
2000	Bad Faith	Lou Miles	
2001	Legally Blonde	Dewey Newcombe	uncredited
2001	Ignition	Conor's Lawyer	
2002	Auto Focus	Bruno Gerussi	
2003	Fast Food High	John Redding	
2003	I Accuse	Det. Murray	
2003	Mimic 3: Sentinel	Det. Gary Dumars	Video
2004	Shallow Ground	Leroy Riley	
2004	Knuckle Sandwich	Mr. O'Doogle	
2004	Phil the Alien	The General	
2005	Aurora Borealis	Stu	
2005	The River King	Joey Tosh	
2006	Stick It	Chris DeFrank	
2006	Fifty Pills	Harold	
2006	Mr. Soul	Bill Corrigan	
2007	Whisper	Whitley	
2007	Everybody Wants to Be Italian	Steve Bottino	
2008	Snow Buddies	Jean George	Video
2009	Tripping Forward	Vladdy	
2010	Junkyard Dog	Hellerman	
2010	Santa Buddies: The Legend of Santa Paws		Video
2012	Not That Funny	Kevork Sarkissian	
2013	Afternoon Delight	Jack	
2013	Miss Dial	Creepy Guy	
2013	Free Ride	Coast Guard Captain	
2013	Who the F Is Buddy Applebaum	Maggs	
2015	Underdog Kids	Teacher	
2016	First Round Down	Sonny	
2017	The Shape of Water	Mr. Arzoumanian	
2018	The Unicorn	Louis	
2018	Blood Type	ER Police Officer Lewis	
2018	22 Chaser	Bissey	
2018	Love Shot	Tony	

=== Television ===
Year	Title	Role	Notes
1985	Miami Vice	Andy Sloan	
1988	Onassis: The Richest Man in the World	Costas Gratsos	TV Movie
1989	Nick Knight	Det. Don Schanke	TV Movie
1990	Counterstrike	Manny	Episode: "Cry of the Children"
1991	And the Sea Will Tell	Len Weinglass	TV Movie
1992–1995	Forever Knight	Det. Don Schanke	
1993	Seinfeld	Barry	Episode: "The Sniffing Accountant"
1994	Cool and the Crazy	The Greek	TV Movie
1995	Lois & Clark: The New Adventures of Superman	Vassily Savchenko (Lucky Leon)	(Episode 16, aired Jun 10, 1995)
2000	God, the Devil and Bob	(voice)	Episode: Bob Gets Committed
2000	Angel	Roland Meeks	Episode: Are You Now or Have You Ever Been
2002	The X-Files	Special Agent Fordyce	
2002	State of Grace	Milton Figer	
2002	The District	Victor Abbot	
2002	CSI: Crime Scene Investigation	Chief Duke Rittle	
2002	Just Cause	Carlos Ramirez	
2002	Boomtown	Hugo Pinkston	
2002	ER	Mr. Irby	
2003	Judging Amy	Zack Wiley	
2003	The Dead Zone	Patrick Hanchin	
2003	Dead Like Me	Angus Cook	
2004	Frasier	Policeman	
2004	Cold Case	John Butler	
2004	Crossing Jordan	Halper	
2004	Identity Theft: The Michelle Brown Story	Ray De Lucc	TV Movie
2004	Without a Trace	Ezra Hafetz	
2004	Boston Legal	Detective Wayne Farley	
2005	Queer as Folk	Don	
2005	McBride: Tune in for Murder	Bob Carter	TV Movie
2005	Gilmore Girls	Orientation Leader	
2005–2007	Flight 29 Down	Captain Russell	
2005	Category 7: The End of the World	Secretary of Homeland Security Jim Roberts	
2006	Desperate Housewives	Eugene Beale	
2006	The Minor Accomplishments of Jackie Woodman	Ken	
2006	CSI: NY	Bobby Rossmore	
2007	One Tree Hill	Carl	
2007	Monk	Paulie Flores	
2008	Chuck	Yari Demitrios	
2008	The Suite Life on Deck	Elias	
2009	Zeke & Luther	Discount Dave	
2009	iCarly	Morris	
2010	The Mentalist	Hank Draber	S2:E19 Blood Money
2011	Shameless	Larry Burke	Episode: Daddyz Girl
2011	Criminal Minds	Sheriff Montell	Episode: Out of the Light
2011	Castle	Joe Pulgatti	S3:E13 "Knockdown"
2013	Modern Family	Stavros	Episode: "Fulgencio"
2013	Psych	Tom Swagerty	2 episodes
2013–2014	Justified	Picker	9 episodes
2014	Transparent	Gary	
2014	Republic of Doyle	Inspector Vince Pickard	
2016	NCIS	Victor Castor	
2016	Impastor	Judge Brenden Bell	
2018	The Expanse	Ren	Episode: "Delta V"
2020	The Umbrella Academy	Jack Ruby	
2020	Medical Police	Frank Neri	
2023–2024	Days of Our Lives	Konstantin Meleounis	
2024	The Lincoln Lawyer	Peter Sterghos	S3:E6

=== Internet ===
- It's All Greek to Me (2007)
