= Jack Blum =

Canadian actor, writer and producer

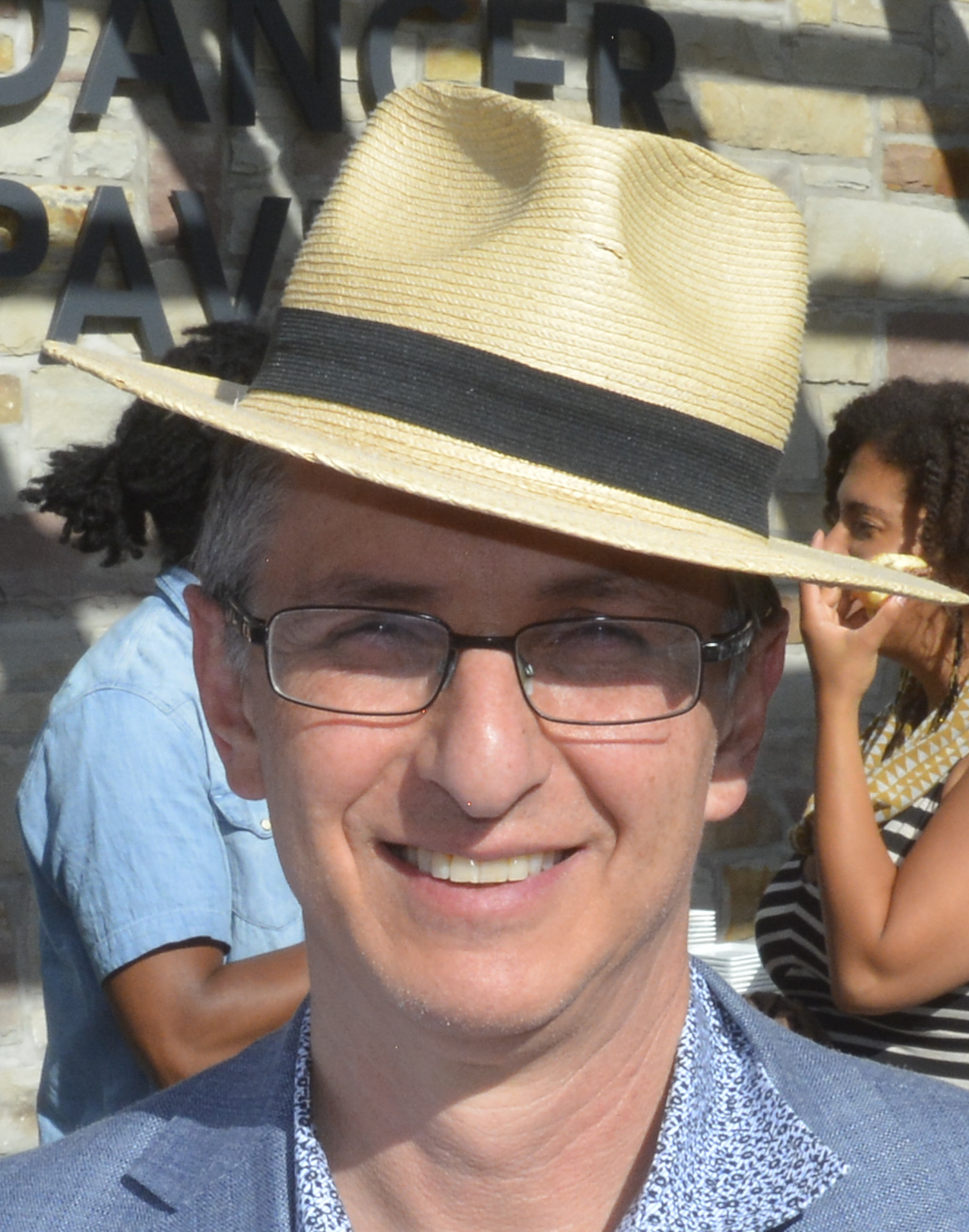
- Jack Blum at the 2016 CFC Annual Garden Party
- Occupations: writer, producer, director, story editor, actor

Jack Blum is a Canadian writer, producer, director, story editor, actor, educator and communications consultant based in Toronto, Ontario, Canada. With his longtime partner Sharon Corder, he has written and produced more than fifty hours of television drama for both Canadian and American broadcasters.

His early acting career included the role of "Spaz" in the comedy hit Meatballs, as well as appearances in dozens of other feature films and television shows.

In the theatre, he directed productions across Canada (including several world premieres) and was associate artistic director at the La Jolla Playhouse in California. He has written many articles about the film industry for periodicals (Take one, Montague, POV), taught courses in screenwriting, and been an advocate for Canadian cinema and culture.

He has worked as a communications consultant for several prominent Canadian politicians. Since 1998, he has served as chair of the Credit Arbitration Committee of the Writers Guild of Canada.

== Biography ==
=== Early life and education ===
Born in Toronto, Ontario, Blum grew up in Hamilton, Ontario, and trained as an actor at the National Theatre School of Canada.

=== Career ===
On graduating from NTS he appeared in many feature films and television shows, including most notably Meatballs. In the early Eighties, Blum began writing for television. In addition to episodes of the series Sons and Daughters and The Edison Twins, he co-wrote and was Associate Producer on the television movie Hockey Night, starring Megan Follows and Rick Moranis, for the Canadian Broadcasting Corporation, and the award-winning short drama The Umpire for the National Film Board of Canada. In 1985 he began working with co-writer Sharon Corder. Together they co-created the celebrated and long-running series Traders, as well as a host of other episodes of television drama. They were Story Editors on the syndicated series Catwalk, Co-producers on Traders (Global), and Supervising Producers on Power Play (CTV).

In 1998 they wrote and produced a feature film, Babyface (directed and co-written by Blum, produced and co-written by Corder), which premiered at the Director's Fortnight in Cannes in 1998.

In 2003, the team produced a short drama, DNA, with Corder scripting and Blum directing. The film stars Michael Riley as a grieving widower struggling to get over his loss.

In 2005, he and Corder founded Reel Canada, an educational program that introduces high school students and new Canadians to Canadian film. In 2014, the organization launched National Canadian Film Day, an annual one-day celebration of Canadian film that features more than 1000 screenings across Canada and around the world.

== Filmography ==
=== Movies ===
Year	Title	Role	Notes
1976	East End Hustle	Ernie	
1979	Meatballs	"Spaz"	
1980	Hog Wild	Gil Lasky	
1981	Happy Birthday to Me	Alfred Morris	
1983	The Funny Farm	Peter Bowman	
1983	Siege	Patrick	
1989	Renegades	Keith Weinstock	
1989	Snake Eater II: The Drug Buster	Billy Ray	
1994	Exotica	Scalper	
2008	Adoration	Passenger & Professor On-Line	

=== Television ===
Year	Title	Role	Notes
1981	Escape from Iran: The Canadian Caper	Louis LeClerc	TV movie
1981	Cagney & Lacey	Hasid #2	1 Episode: Pilot
1983	Strawberry Shortcake: Housewarming Surprise	Captain Cackle	TV movie
1985	The Littlest Hobo	Unknown	1 Episode: Pandora
1985	Shellgame	Winton	TV movie
1987–1989	Street Legal	Roger Pitman / Collins	2 episodes: A Little Knowledge, Slipping Through the Cracks
1989	The Twilight Zone	Advisor	1 Episode: The Wall
1989	Alfred Hitchcock Presents	Mickey	1 Episode: Diamonds Aren't Forever
1989	Bionic Showdown: The Six Million Dollar Man and the Bionic Woman	Larry	TV movie
1991	Dracula: The Series	Lawrence Lei / Alfred	1 Episode: Bats in the Attic
1991	Sweating Bullets	Coin Collector	1 Episode: Big Brother is Watching
1993	Gross Misconduct: The Life of Brian Spencer	Leaf T.V. Director	TV movie
1994–1995	Kung Fu: The Legend Continues	Bernie / Louis	2 episodes: May I Ride with You, Deadly Fashion
2003	Cowboys and Indians: The J.J. Harper Story	Harvey Pollock, QC	TV movie

For Kids’ Records, Blum also scripted and directed the children's audio tape A Child's Look at - What it Means to be Jewish, and, with Corder, A Child's look at - Mozart.

== Awards ==
The Umpire: First Prize at the Festival of the Humanities, San Francisco Blue Ribbon, American Film Festival, New York Hockey Night: C.F.T.A. Award, Best Feature Length Production ACTRA Award Nominee; Best Original Screenplay, ACTRA Award Nominee; Best Children's Program What it Means to be Jewish: Best Spoken Word Recording, National Independent American Distributors Award, San Francisco Getting out: Dora Mavor Moore Award for Artistic Excellence and Theatrical Innovation
