= James D. Parriott =

American director, producer (b. 1950)

James D. Parriott (born November 14, 1950, in Denver, Colorado) is an American writer, director, and producer, with his own eponymous production company.

== Career ==
Parriott created the series Voyagers!, Misfits of Science, Forever Knight, Educating Matt Waters, The American Embassy and Defying Gravity.

== Awards ==
In addition to numerous awards won by series he has created or produced, Parriott has been nominated for a number of awards, and has won three; the Writers Guild of America TV Award (2006 & 2007), and the Producers Guild of America Television Producer of the Year Award in Episodic series (2007).

== Credits ==
=== Film ===
Film	Writer	Director	Executive producer
Heart Condition (1990)	Yes	Yes	
Rag and Bone (1997)	Yes	Yes	Yes
Good (1998)		Yes	
Transylvanian Curse (2015)			Yes

=== Television ===
Television	Creator	Writer	Director	Producer	Supervising producer	Executive producer	Coexecutive producer	Show runner	Special Thanks
The Six Million Dollar Man (1975)		Yes							
The Invisible Man (1975–1976)		Yes							
Gemini Man (1976)		Yes							
The Bionic Woman (1976–1978)		Yes		Yes					
The American Girls (1978)		Yes	Yes						
The Incredible Hulk (1977–1978)		Yes	Yes	Yes	Yes				
The Legend of the Golden Gun (1979)		Yes			Yes				
From Here to Eternity (1980)			Yes						
Nick and the Dobermans (1980)		Yes		Yes					
Alex and the Doberman Gang (1980)		Yes			Yes				
The Seal (1981)		Yes				Yes			
Fitz and Bones (1981)							Yes		
Voyagers! (1982–1983)	Yes	Yes				Yes			
Hawaiian Heat (1984)						Yes			
Voyager from the Unknown (1985)	Yes	Yes	Yes			Yes			
Misfits of Science (1985–1986)	Yes	Yes	Yes						
Island Sons (1987)		Yes				Yes			
Nick Knight (1989)	Yes	Yes							
Elvis (1990)						Yes			
Forever Knight (1992–1996)	Yes	Yes							
Staying Afloat (1993)						Yes			
Bodyguards (1995 pilot)		Yes	Yes			Yes			
The Invaders (1995)						Yes			
Educating Matt Waters (1996)	Yes					Yes			
Dark Skies (1996–1997)		Yes				Yes			
Rag and Bone (1998 pilot)		Yes				Yes			
Action (1999)			Yes						
Tucker (2001)			Yes						
Push, Nevada (2002)		Yes					Yes		
MDs (2002)						Yes		Yes	
The American Embassy (2002)	Yes	Yes				Yes			
The Partners (2003)						Yes			
Threat Matrix (2003)		Yes				Yes			
Grey's Anatomy (2005–2015)		Yes				Yes			Yes
Ugly Betty (2006–2007)		Yes				Yes			
Sons of Anarchy (2008)		Yes				Yes			
Defying Gravity (2009)	Yes	Yes							
Covert Affairs (2010–2012)		Yes				Yes			
Missing (2012)		Yes				Yes			
Patriot (2017–2018)						Yes			
