= Forever Knight =

- Genre: Occult detective fiction Police procedural Horror; Supernatural drama
- Created by: Barney Cohen; James D. Parriott
- Starring: Geraint Wyn Davies; Catherine Disher; Nigel Bennett; Ben Bass; Deborah Duchêne; Blu Mankuma; John Kapelos; Lisa Ryder; Gary Farmer
- Theme music composer: Fred Mollin
- Country of origin: Canada
- Original language: English
- No. of seasons: 3
- No. of episodes: 70 (list of episodes)

Production
- Production locations: Toronto; Uxbridge, Ontario
- Cinematography: Albert J. Dunk
- Running time: 47 min. (Season 1); 44 min. (Seasons 2-3)
- Production companies: Glen-Warren Great Entertainment (1992–1993) (season 1); Paragon Entertainment Corporation; Tele-München; TriStar Television; USA Network (1995–1996) (season 3)

Original release
- Network: CBS (season 1); First-run syndication (season 2); USA Network (season 3)
- Release: May 5, 1992 – May 17, 1996

Forever Knight is a Canadian television series about Nick Knight, an 800-year-old vampire working as a police detective in modern-day Toronto, Ontario. Wracked with guilt for centuries of killing others, he seeks redemption by working as a homicide detective on the night shift while struggling to find a way to become human again. The series premiered on May 5, 1992, and concluded with the third-season finale on May 17, 1996.

== Plot ==
Nick Knight is a Toronto police detective who works the graveyard shift with his partner. Unbeknownst to most of his colleagues, Nick is actually Nicholas, an 800-year-old vampire (his human surname alludes to his origin, as a literal knight in medieval France). Remorseful over centuries spent as a vampiric cold-hearted killer, Nicholas serves the public good as a police officer. He often uses his special abilities to bring criminals to justice. Whenever he works on his cases, Nicholas remembers similar situations from previous lifetimes which appear as flashbacks in the episodes. Nick explains his need to work on the night shift by claiming to have a skin disorder, photodermatitis, which requires him to stay out of sunlight. Refusing to feed from humans, he survives by drinking bottled animal blood, something that most vampires find repulsive. The only human who knows his true nature is his friend Natalie Lambert, a medical examiner who does not like when he uses his special powers as she believes it increases his need for blood.

Nick's ultimate dream is to find a way to become human once again, but his quest for redemption is complicated by the arrival of fellow vampires Lucien LaCroix and Janette DuCharme. Lucien was a general in the early Roman Empire who was turned into a vampire by his daughter Divia as Mount Vesuvius erupted in AD 79. Lucien made Nick a vampire in 1228. Lucien had already made Janette a vampire. They were Nick's companions for many centuries until he left them, seeking redemption and a way to reclaim his lost humanity. Janette runs a night club, while LaCroix works as a late-night talk radio host. Although Janette is scornful yet tolerant of Nicholas's new lifestyle, LaCroix actively attempts to seduce his protégé back to a more violent life.

During the series, Nick had two partners. For the first two seasons, it is Don Schanke. At the beginning of the third season, Detective Schanke dies in an airplane explosion caused by a bomber, and Nick is assigned a new partner, Tracy Vetter, a rookie detective who receives the assignment due to her father's high-ranking position in the police force. Tracy finds herself increasingly attracted to Javier Vachon, another vampire who had been a conquistador centuries earlier. Nick and Vachon know about each other, and Tracy knows about Vachon being a vampire, but she does not know Nick is also a vampire.

Although Nick continues to protect the "innocent" civilians, he faces circumstances that risk the exposure of the vampire community who, up until this time, were unknown to other humans. He is faced with the choice to either relocate or attempt to recapture his humanity through a method that puts Natalie's life in the balance. At that point, LaCroix appears and indicates the time to leave is near and he must either bring Natalie over or leave her to die. Nicholas decides that neither option is acceptable and hands LaCroix a wooden stake. We do not see what LaCroix does, but we hear him say, "Damn you, Nicholas," in stress and frustration, and the scene cuts out to the building where Nick lives and a shot of the sun rising. The ending is left to the viewers' interpretation, but the implication is that Nick dies with LaCroix's help, hoping to join Natalie in an afterlife.

== Cast ==
- Geraint Wyn Davies as Detective Nick Knight
- Nigel Bennett as Lucien LaCroix
- Deborah Duchêne as Janette DuCharme
- Catherine Disher as Natalie Lambert
- John Kapelos as Detective Donald Schanke (seasons 1 & 2)
- Gary Farmer as Captain Joe Stonetree (season 1)
- Natsuko Ohama as Captain Amanda Cohen (season 2)
- Ben Bass as Javier Vachon (season 3)
- Lisa Ryder as Detective Tracy Vetter (season 3)
- Blu Mankuma as Captain Joe Reese (season 3)
- Greg Kramer as Screed (season 3)
- Ian D. Clark as Dr. Spense

== Production ==
=== Development ===
The series originated as a 1989 CBS television movie, Nick Knight, with Rick Springfield playing the title character. In 1992, CBS began broadcasting the series as part of its Crimetime After Primetime lineup, with a new name and with Geraint Wyn Davies now playing Nick Knight (using a pilot that had been re-shot with Davies).

== Vampires in the Forever Knight universe ==
=== Vampires in society ===
Though not the first sympathetic vampire detective in fiction (Hannibal King, a vampire private detective who similarly refused to indulge his blood lust, preceded him in the pages of Marvel Comics' Tomb of Dracula by some years), Forever Knight helped popularize the concept. As such, it is seen as a direct precursor to other vampire detective/investigator shows such as Angel and Blood Ties.

In common with other vampire literature of the 1990s, when AIDS was a common societal anxiety, vampirism in Forever Knight is partly approached as a disease to be overcome. The Elizabeth Glaser Pediatric AIDS Foundation is series star Geraint Wyn Davies' favoured charity; the "Bridging the Knight" fan event raised money for Casey House, an AIDS hospice in Toronto, helped in part by donations from Forever Knight producer Nicolas Gray, as well as the series' actors and crew.

=== Vampire powers ===
Nick Knight, as well as several other vampire characters, demonstrates a number of superhuman abilities. As a vampire, Nick has not aged throughout nearly 800 years of existence. In most cases, he is invulnerable to harm from gun shots, blunt force trauma, or blade. Vampires in the Forever Knight universe display the powers of super strength and speed, enhanced senses, flight, and a degree of hypnotism/mind control. However, Nick's hypnotism does not always work, especially if the victim has physical evidence that opposes what Nick would have him or her believe. Vampires in the Forever Knight universe are not reanimated corpses; their hearts beat a few times every ten minutes, as is stated in one episode. None of the vampires turn into such things as bats, wolves, mist, or fog.

Two episodes reveal that vampirism in the Forever Knight universe is to some degree a psychosomatic condition. Although vampires suffer the standard aversion to garlic and combust in the presence of holy objects or sunlight, vampires that have forgotten what they are, due to suffering a physical or mental trauma, are completely unaffected by these things.

== Episodes ==
The series aired on CBS from May 5, 1992, to March 2, 1993, in first-run syndication from September 12, 1994, to July 24, 1995, and on USA Network from September 11, 1995, to May 13, 1996, running for three seasons and a total of 70 episodes. Reruns were also seen in syndication during the mid-to-late 90s.

Sky UK in the United Kingdom broadcast it during 1995 on Sky One at 11pm, marking the only time it was shown in the UK, as it has never been rerun.

== Home media ==
Sony Pictures Home Entertainment has released the entire series on DVD in Region 1 (US only) in 3 volume sets. Madman Entertainment released the entire series in Region 4 (Australia), in the same format.

Season One
Set Details
Notes
- 22 Episodes
- 5-Disc Set (North America) / 6-Disc Set (Germany)
- 1035 minutes
- 1.33:1 Aspect Ratio
- Subtitles: varies by region
- English (Dolby Digital 2 0 Surround)
- The German release is in two parts, each containing 3 discs.
Release dates
North America
Germany
United Kingdom
Australia
21 October 2003
19 February 2010
—N/a
1 July 2015

Season Two
Set Details
Notes
- 26 Episodes
- 6-Disc Set
- 1148 minutes
- 1.33:1 Aspect Ratio
- Subtitles: English
- English (Dolby Digital 2 0 Surround)
- The German release is in two parts, each containing 3 discs.
- Commentaries
  - "Killer Instinct" by James D. Parriott and Geraint Wyn Davies
  - "Curiouser & Curiouser" by Nigel Bennett
  - "A More Permanent Hell" by Nigel Bennett
  - "Blood Money" by James D. Parriott and Geraint Wyn Davies
Release dates
North America
Germany
United Kingdom
Australia
4 January 2005
27 May 2011
—N/a
2 September 2015

Season Three
Set Details
Notes
- 22 Episodes
- 5-Disc Set
- 969 minutes
- 1.33:1 Aspect Ratio
- Subtitles: English, Spanish and French
- English (Dolby Digital 2 0 Surround)
- Music videos:
  - Black Rose
  - The Hunger
  - Touch the Night
Release dates
North America
Germany
United Kingdom
Australia
3 October 2006
—N/a
—N/a
14 October 2015

== In other media ==
=== Novels ===
There have been three novels written based on the series:

- Susan Sizemore (1997). Forever Knight: A Stirring of Dust. Boulevard Books. ISBN 978-1-57297-238-4.
- Susan M. Garrett (1997). Forever Knight: Intimations of Mortality. Boulevard Books. ISBN 978-1-57297-313-8.
- Anne Hathaway Nayne (1997). Forever Knight: These Our Revels. Boulevard Books. ISBN 978-0-425-16491-4.

=== Soundtracks ===
There have been two soundtrack CDs released that contain selections from the score. The first was released on 25 July 1996 and the second was released on 11 May 1999

Forever Knight: Original Television Soundtrack
No.	Title	Artists	Length
1.	"Forever Knight Theme"	Fred Mollin	1:30
2.	"The Hunger"	Fred Mollin, Stan Meissner, Lori Yates	3:12
3.	"What a Wonderful Thing Humanity Is"	Fred Mollin, Nigel Bennett	0:16
4.	"Dark Knight/France 1228/Cherry Blossoms/The Ambush"	Fred Mollin	3:29
5.	"Suite from Queen of Harps"	Fred Mollin	7:23
6.	"Suite from the Hunted"	Fred Mollin	5:23
7.	"Nick's Piano Theme/Suite from Forward into the Past"	Fred Mollin, Geraint Wyn Davies	6:58
8.	"Black Rose"	Fred Mollin, Stan Meissner, Lori Yates	3:42
9.	"Suite from Amateur Night"	Fred Mollin	5:19
10.	"If You Love Something"	Fred Mollin, Nigel Bennett	0:11
11.	"Suite from Be My Valentine"	Fred Mollin	6:41
12.	"Father Figure/Nick's Lullaby to Lisa"	Fred Mollin	2:30
13.	"Suite from Dark Knight"	Fred Mollin	6:12
14.	"You Would Do Well to Avoid Me"	Fred Mollin, Nigel Bennett	0:14
15.	"Touch the Night"	Fred Mollin, Stan Meissner, Lori Yates	4:21
16.	"Avenging Angel/Time Stands Still"	Fred Mollin	3:02
17.	"Curiouser and Curiouser/Nick and Janette"	Fred Mollin	1:39
18.	"Suite from Undue Process"	Fred Mollin	5:06
19.	"Suite from a More Permanent Hell"	Fred Mollin	4:16
20.	"Baby, Baby/CN Tower Finale"	Fred Mollin	1:34
21.	"Only One Thing Is Truly Permanent"	Fred Mollin, Nigel Bennett	0:17
22.	"Dark Side of the Glass"	Fred Mollin, Stan Meissner, Lori Yates	3:21
Total length:			76:36

Forever Knight: More Music from the Original Television Soundtrack
No.	Title	Artists	Length
1.	"Forever Knight (Main Title)"	Fred Mollin	1:43
2.	"Night Calls My Name"	Fred Mollin, Lori Yates	3:21
3.	"Humanity"	Fred Mollin, Nigel Bennett	0:23
4.	"Suite from Black Buddha: The Explosion/ Vachon Blinks/Goodbye, Schanke/Flashback #2"	Fred Mollin	5:06
5.	"Suite from Blackwing: Flash to the Spirit Plane/Vachon and Tracy/Vachon's Flashback/Nick on the Spirit Plane"	Fred Mollin	6:22
6.	"You Are One Strange Guy"	Fred Mollin, John Kapelos	0:17
7.	"Suite from the Human Factor: Janette on the Stairs/Flashback#2/In the Mall/The Shooting/In the House/Drama Unfolds"	Fred Mollin	8:41
8.	"Heart of Darkness"	Fred Mollin, Lori Yates	3:47
9.	"Suite from Faithful Followers: The Cult Meeting/The Big Moment"	Fred Mollin	4:42
10.	"Suite from Let No Man Tear Asunder: Tracy and the Doc/Nick Rescues Natalie/Vachon and Tracy/Lacroix on the Air"	Fred Mollin	3:41
11.	"Knight in Question: ER Tension"	Fred Mollin	1:40
12.	"Lacroix Reads a Book"	Fred Mollin, Nigel Bennett	0:17
13.	"Destiny's Edge"	Fred Mollin, Lori Yates	3:18
14.	"Suite from Stranger Than Fiction: Natalie's Fantasy/Andrew Gets Weird"	Fred Mollin	2:40
15.	"How Does He Do It"	Fred Mollin, John Kapelos	0:16
16.	"Love You to Death: Charlie and Lucy/Nick Flies"	Fred Mollin	1:27
17.	"Suite from the Fever: Tracy and Vachon/The Terror/A Sad Wrap-Up"	Fred Mollin	3:13
18.	"Ashes to Ashes: More Lacroix and Divia"	Fred Mollin	2:16
19.	"Hasta la Bye Bye"	Fred Mollin, Geraint Wyn Davies, John Kapelos	0:26
20.	"Suite from Games Vampires Play: V.R. Yet Again/Nick Plays Again"	Fred Mollin	3:43
21.	"The Hunter: Nick Flashback #1"	Fred Mollin	2:16
22.	"One Law"	Fred Mollin, Nigel Bennett	0:26
23.	"Break the Silence"	Fred Mollin, Molly Johnson	3:14
24.	"How I Have Faith"	Fred Mollin, Geraint Wyn Davies	0:18
25.	"Suite from Last Knight: Nick and Nat/The Big Moment/Lacroix and Nick Encore/The Final Decision/End of an Era"	Fred Mollin	9:01
Total length:			72:34

== Reception ==
=== Awards ===
Forever Knight was nominated for 13 Gemini Awards, and won once in 1996. It was also nominated for a Golden Reel Award in 1992, but did not win. It was ranked #23 on TV Guide's Top Cult Shows Ever in 2004, but was taken off the list in 2007.

Year	Award	Category/Recipient	Result
1992	Golden Reel Award	Best Sound Editing - Television Episodic - Effects & Foley: Kevin Howard	Nominated
1993	Gemini Award	Best Sound in a Dramatic Program or Series: Chaim Gilad; Terry Gordica; Steve Foster; Kevin Howard; James Porteous	Nominated
1993	Gemini Award	Best Photography in a Dramatic Program or Series: Albert J. Dunk	Nominated
1993	Gemini Award	Best Performance by an Actor in a Continuing Leading Dramatic Role: Geraint Wyn Davies	Nominated
1993	Gemini Award	Best Performance by a Supporting Actor: Nigel Bennett	Nominated
1993	Gemini Award	Best Direction in a Dramatic Program or Mini-Series: Allan Kroeker	Nominated
1994	Gemini Award	Best Photography in a Dramatic Program or Series: Albert J. Dunk	Nominated
1994	Gemini Award	Best Performance by an Actress in a Continuing Leading Dramatic Role: Catherine Disher	Nominated
1994	Gemini Award	Best Dramatic Series: James D. Parriott; Lionel E. Siegel; Nicholas J. Gray; Jon Slan; Richard Borchiver	Nominated
1996	Gemini Award	Best Performance by an Actress in a Supporting Role in a Dramatic Program or Mini-Series: Deborah Duchêne	Nominated
1996	Gemini Award	Best Performance by an Actress in a Continuing Leading Dramatic Role: Catherine Disher	Nominated
1996	Gemini Award	Best Performance by an Actor in a Continuing Leading Dramatic Role: Geraint Wyn Davies	Nominated
1996	Gemini Award	Best Performance by an Actor in a Supporting Role in a Dramatic Series: Nigel Bennett	Won
1997	Gemini Award	Best Original Music Score for a Dramatic Series: Fred Mollin	Nominated
1997	Gemini Award	Best Dramatic Series: Jon Slan; Richard Borchiver; James D. Parriott	Nominated

== See also ==
- Vampire film
- Angel, an American TV series, also about a vampire seeking redemption after being cursed with a soul.
  - List of vampire television series
