= Geraint Wyn Davies =

Wales-born American actor

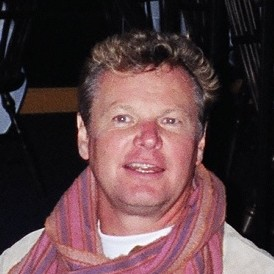
- Davies in 2004
- Born: April 20, 1957 (age 69); Swansea, Wales
- Education: University of Western Ontario
- Occupations: Actor; director; musician
- Years active: 1976–present
- Spouses: Alana Guinn (m. 1985; div. 2006) Claire Lautier (m. 2011)
- Children: 2

Geraint Wyn Davies (/ˈɡɛraɪnt/ GHERR-eyent, Welsh: [ˈɡɛraint]) (April 20, 1957) is a British-American stage, film and television actor. Born in Wales and educated in Canada, he became a citizen of the United States on 13 June 2006, having been sworn in by then Associate Supreme Court Justice Ruth Bader Ginsburg. His most famous role as the vampire-turned police detective Nick Knight in the Canadian television series Forever Knight.

== Early life and education ==
Davies studied at the University of Western Ontario, where he studied economics before dropping out to pursue an acting career.

== Career ==
=== Acting ===
His professional stage debut was in 1976 in Quebec City, when at age 19 he appeared in The Fantasticks, Red Emma, and A Midsummer Night's Dream. He relocated from Quebec to London's Centre Stage theatre company, and later played the lead in The Last Englishman with the British Actors Theatre Company. He spent two seasons with Theatr Clwyd, touring Britain in Enemy of the People and Hamlet (for which he received the Regional Theatre Best Actor award), and a season with the Chichester Festival, in Henry VIII. In Canada, he appeared over several seasons with the Shaw Festival and Stratford Festival of Canada. He gained a reputation for his performances in The Music Cure, Candida, Cyrano de Bergerac, The Vortex, Goodnight Disgrace, Henry V, and The Three Musketeers. He sang his way through the Rodgers and Hart musical The Boys from Syracuse. Other stage performances include My Fat Friend in Los Angeles and Sleuth (with Patrick Macnee) in Toronto. In 2004, he appeared in Washington, D.C., in the title role of Cyrano de Bergerac.

In April 1996, Davies appeared as Petruchio in Shakespeare's The Taming of The Shrew, directed by Patrick Tucker of the Original Shakespeare Company. This three-performance run was presented as Shakespeare's own players may have done—with sparse rehearsal, eclectic costuming, and rotating roles. In Spring 1998, he appeared in the Moises Kaufmann production Gross Indecency: The Three Trials of Oscar Wilde at the Mark Taper Forum in Los Angeles. Gross Indecency earned the Garland Award for "Best Ensemble Cast from Backstage West" that year. In August 1999, he starred in Leon Pownall's one-man show An Evening with Dylan Thomas at the Atlantic Theatre Festival in Nova Scotia, Canada. The following summer he returned to the Atlantic Theatre Festival in Pownall's Dylan Thomas and Shakespeare: In the Envy of Some Greatness. August 2001 saw the completion of Pownall's Dylan Thomas trilogy with Stranger in Paradise. In mid-2002, he returned to the Stratford Festival Theatre's main stage in My Fair Lady, as Henry Higgins, a role he alternated with Colm Feore. He reprised the role of Dylan Thomas at the Festival's Studio Theatre, and returned to the Atlantic Theatre Festival in August 2003 to perform Hughie (a one-act play by Eugene O'Neill). The evening was topped off by a presentation of The Sermon by David Mamet.

In 2004, Davies performed at the Lincoln in New York City as Edmund to Christopher Plummer's King Lear. In the summer of 2004, he starred in the title role of Cyrano in Barry Kornhauser's adaptation of Cyrano de Bergerac at The Shakespeare Theatre in Washington, D.C., for which he won the Helen Hayes Award for Outstanding Lead Actor in a Resident Play.

For the Stratford Festival's 60th season in 2013, Davies portrayed Duke Vincentio in Measure for Measure and the Earl of Leicester in Mary Stuart. The following year, he continued at the Stratford Festival, portraying Antony in Antony & Cleopatra and the Cook in Mother Courage and Her Children. For the 2015 season, he portrayed Claudius in Hamlet, and Johann Wilhelm Mobius in The Physicists. He played Prospero in The Tempest in the 2014-2015 season of The Shakespeare Theatre of Washington, D.C. In 2025, he returned to the Stratford Festival, playing Autolycus in The Winter's Tale. The following year, he returned to Stratford again, this time playing Prospero in The Tempest.

=== Directing ===
Davies has directed several episodes of Forever Knight, Black Harbour, Pit Pony, Power Play and North of 60.

== Personal life ==
Wyn Davies was married to Canadian artist Alana Guinn from 1985 to 2006. They have two children. In August 2011, he married actress Claire Lautier.

== Filmography ==
Davies made his film debut in Deadly Harvest in 1977, and has since appeared in many films, among them RoboCop: Prime Directives (2000). In 2007 he appeared in a cameo in Nancy Drew and filmed a made-for-TV movie, Post Mortem for Lifetime.

- Deadly Harvest (1977) - Michael Franklin
- D.O.A. (1978) - Jon
- A Paid Vacation (1979) - Rick Jarrell
- The Boys from Syracuse (1986) - Antipholus of Syracuse
- Learning to Fly (1986) - Young pilot
- IKWE: Daughters of the Country (1987) - Angus
- The Taming of the Shrew (1988) - Hortensio
- Bionic Showdown: The Six Million Dollar Man and the Bionic Woman (1989) - Allan Devlin
- Terror Stalks the Class Reunion (1992) - Anton/Tony
- Hush Little Baby (1993) - Dr. Martin Nolan
- Other Women's Children (1993) - Matt Stewart
- Ghost Mom (1993) - Martin Mallory
- Dancing in the Dark (1995) - Dr. Lambert
- The Conspiracy of Fear (1996) - Timothy Straker
- Trilogy of Terror II (1996) - Ben
- One of the Hollywood Ten (2000) - Michael Wilson
- Trudeau (2002) - Premier William G. Davis
- American Psycho 2 (2002) - Daniels
- Cube 2: Hypercube (2002) - Simon Grady
- The Wild Dogs (2002) - Colin
- Some Things That Stay (2004) - Mr. Murphy
- I Know What I Saw (2007) - Detective Morgan
- Pavane (2008) - Phil
- Antony and Cleopatra (2015) — Antony
- Hamlet (2016) - Claudius
- The Merry Wives of Windsor (2020) - Falstaff
- The Scottish Play (2020) - Hugh Painter

== Television ==
Davies was a regular in the cast of To Serve and Protect. Since Forever Knight he has appeared in several series. He has guest-starred in episodes of Katts and Dog, Highlander: The Series, Kung Fu: The Legend Continues, The Outer Limits, RoboCop: The Series, Diamonds, Sweating Bullets, 1-800-Missing, among others.

- Hangin' In (1982) as Drake/Jonathan (2 episodes)
- The Littlest Hobo (1982–83) as Adam Coulter/David Barrington (3 episodes)
- The Judge (1986) as Allan Pearson (6 episodes)
- Airwolf (1987) as Major Mike Rivers (24 episodes)
- Dracula: The Series (1990–91) as Klaus Helsing (5 episodes)
- Highlander: The Series (1993) as Michael Moore/Quentin Barnes
- Forever Knight (1992–96) as Det. Nicholas 'Nick' Knight/Nicholas de Brabant (70 episodes)
- RoboCop (1994) as Martin (episode: "Provision 22")
- Black Harbour (1996–99) as Nick Haskell (34 episodes)
- The Outer Limits (1996–2001) as David / Sheriff Grady Markham (2 episodes)
- Robocop: Prime Directives (2001) (TV mini-series) as Dr. David Kaydick
- Tracker (2001–2002) as Zin (12 episodes)
- Slings and Arrows (2005) as Henry Breedlove (5 episodes)
- 24 (2006) as James Nathanson (6 episodes)
- ReGenesis (2007–2008) as Carleton Riddlemeyer (18 episodes)
- Murdoch Mysteries (2008, 2013) as Sir Arthur Conan Doyle (3 episodes)
- Frankie Drake Mysteries (2021) as Ned Drake (one episode)
