= Phil Guerrero =

Canadian television host and actor

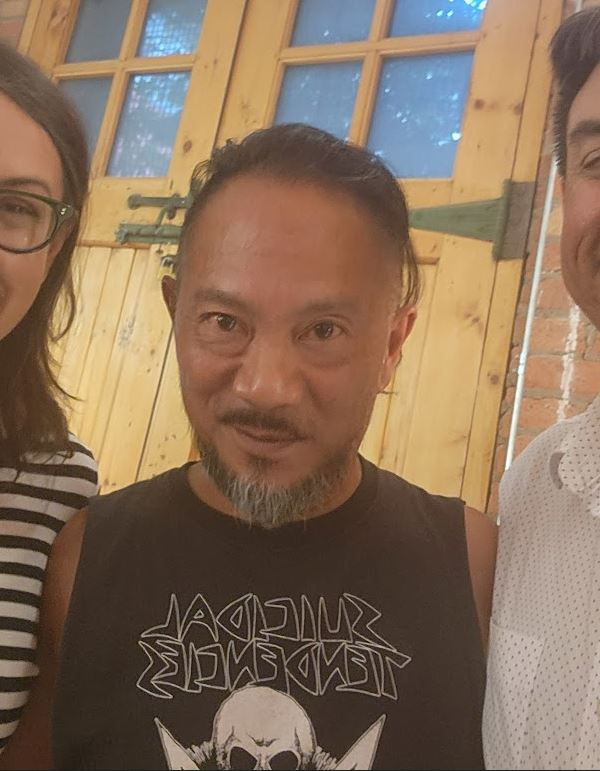
- Born: Jacques Philip Guerrero; June 6, 1971 (age 55); Canada
- Occupations: Television host; actor; voice actor; musician
- Years active: 1989–present
- Known for: The Zone on YTV

Phil Guerrero, also known as PJ "Fresh" Phil, is a Canadian television host, actor, voice actor, and musician. He is best known for hosting The Zone on YTV throughout the 1990s, where he was one of the network's most prominent program jockeys (PJs).

== Early life ==
One of Phil's earliest television appearance was on a segment of the first season of OWL/TV, where he and other children in the Hoot Club built a giant totem pole out of paper and cardboard.

He attended Upper Canada College in Toronto, before eventually being kicked out in 10th grade and reenrolling at Jarvis Collegiate Institute.

A childhood friend, Russell Chong, who worked in acting, secured Guerrero an audition for the YTV music program YTV Rocks. Although he did not get the co-hosting role, he was brought on as a reporter for the show during his last year of high school in 1989.

Guerrero briefly studied political science at Concordia University in Montreal before being called back by YTV for additional auditions for The Hit List and StreetNOISE, which he didn't end up getting.

== Career ==
=== YTV (1991–1999) ===
Guerrero began his career at YTV after being offered a three-day-per-week, six-month contract as a program jockey (PJ) for the network's after-school programming block. He became the host of The Afterschool Zone (later renamed The Zone), YTV's flagship programming block that aired weekday afternoons, where he introduced shows such as Mighty Morphin Power Rangers, Goosebumps, Sailor Moon, and Are You Afraid of the Dark?. On The Zone, he interacted with puppet characters including Snit and the Grogs.

Guerrero also hosted several other YTV programs during this period, including The Anti-Gravity Room, Gamerz and Warp, the latter alongside fellow PJ Paul McGuire.

From 1993 to 1998, Guerrero was a host of Dark Night, YTV's annual Halloween programming special. The first Dark Night (1993) featured Guerrero alongside PJs Jenn and Warren Grog on a candlelit set with back-to-back episodes of Are You Afraid of the Dark?. The specials grew in scope over subsequent years; Dark Night 3 (1995) was filmed at Casa Loma, and Dark Night 4 (1996) featured Guerrero and McGuire in a narrative filmed on the streets of Toronto near YTV's Jefferson Avenue headquarters. Dark Night 5 (1997) employed found footage techniques predating The Blair Witch Project.

In 1999, Guerrero co-hosted the 10th Annual YTV Achievement Awards.

In 2015, blogTO ranked Guerrero as the number one YTV PJ of all time, calling him "the undisputed King of PJs" who "encouraged a generation of Canadian kids to pick up a guitar and follow their dreams."

In 2026 he started a podcast ‘PJ Phil’s Last Stand’.

=== Karaoke Star Jr. (2009) ===
In 2009, Guerrero returned to YTV as the host of Karaoke Star Jr., a children's singing competition series that premiered on March 16, 2009. Paul McGuire hosted the companion adult version, Karaoke Star, on CMT.

=== Acting and voice acting ===
Guerrero has acted in several film and television productions. His credits include a role as Fernando in Relic Hunter (1999), Young Lover in The Ladies Man (2000), and Lee Fung in The Returned (2013).

From 2000 to 2002, he voiced the character Ace Nakamura, the protagonist's best friend, in the Nelvana-produced animated series Pelswick, which aired on CBC and Nickelodeon.

=== Music ===
Guerrero is also a musician and guitarist. In 2003, he joined the industrial/gothic rock band Razed in Black, fronted by Romell Regulacion, as their lead guitar player, touring North America.

=== Convention appearances ===
Since 2012, Guerrero has been active on the Canadian fan convention circuit, making appearances at events including Atomic Lollipop, Hamilton Comic Con, Kitchener Comic Con, Anime Toronto, and others across Canada.

== Filmography ==
=== Television ===
Year	Title	Role	Notes
1991–1999	The Zone	Host (PJ Phil)	YTV programming block
1993–1998	Dark Night	Host	YTV Halloween specials
1999	Relic Hunter	Fernando	Television series
1999	10th Annual YTV Achievement Awards	Co-host	
2000–2002	Pelswick	Ace Nakamura (voice)	Animated series
2006	Style Me with Rachel Hunter	Contestant	Reality series
2009	Karaoke Star Jr.	Host	YTV

=== Film ===
Year	Title	Role	Notes
2000	The Ladies Man	Young Lover	Film
2013	The Returned	Lee Fung	Film
