= Réno-Dépôt =

Canadian home improvement store chain owned by Rona, Inc

- Type: Subsidiary
- Industry: Home improvement
- Founded: March 31, 1993 (first store)
- Defunct: October 10, 2024; 20 months ago
- Fate: Converted into RONA+
- Successor: RONA+
- Headquarters: 220 Ch. du Tremblay, Boucherville, QC J4B 8H7
- Number of locations: 20
- Key people: Robert Dutton (president and CEO); André H. Gagnon (chairman)
- Products: Retail (Home improvement)
- Owner: Rona, Inc.
- Parent: Molson Companies (1993–1997); Castorama (1997–1998); Kingfisher plc (1998–2003); Rona, Inc. (2003–2016); Lowe's Canada (2016–2023); Sycamore Partners (2023–2024)
- Website: www.renodepot.com

Réno-Dépôt (known as Reno-Depot outside of Quebec) was a Canadian chain of home supply stores owned by Rona, Inc. Primarily operating in Quebec, Réno-Dépôt was a warehouse-styled format with a focus on discounted renovation and household hardware products. The chain briefly expanded into Ontario under the name The Building Box; following Rona's acquisition of Réno-Dépôt, these stores were re-branded as Rona Home & Garden locations in 2004.

The chain was briefly relaunched in 2013 as a discount wholesale retailer, with the chain operating primarily in Quebec, as well as selected locations in Alberta and Ontario. The chain's remaining locations were closed and rebranded as Rona+ in 2024.

== History ==
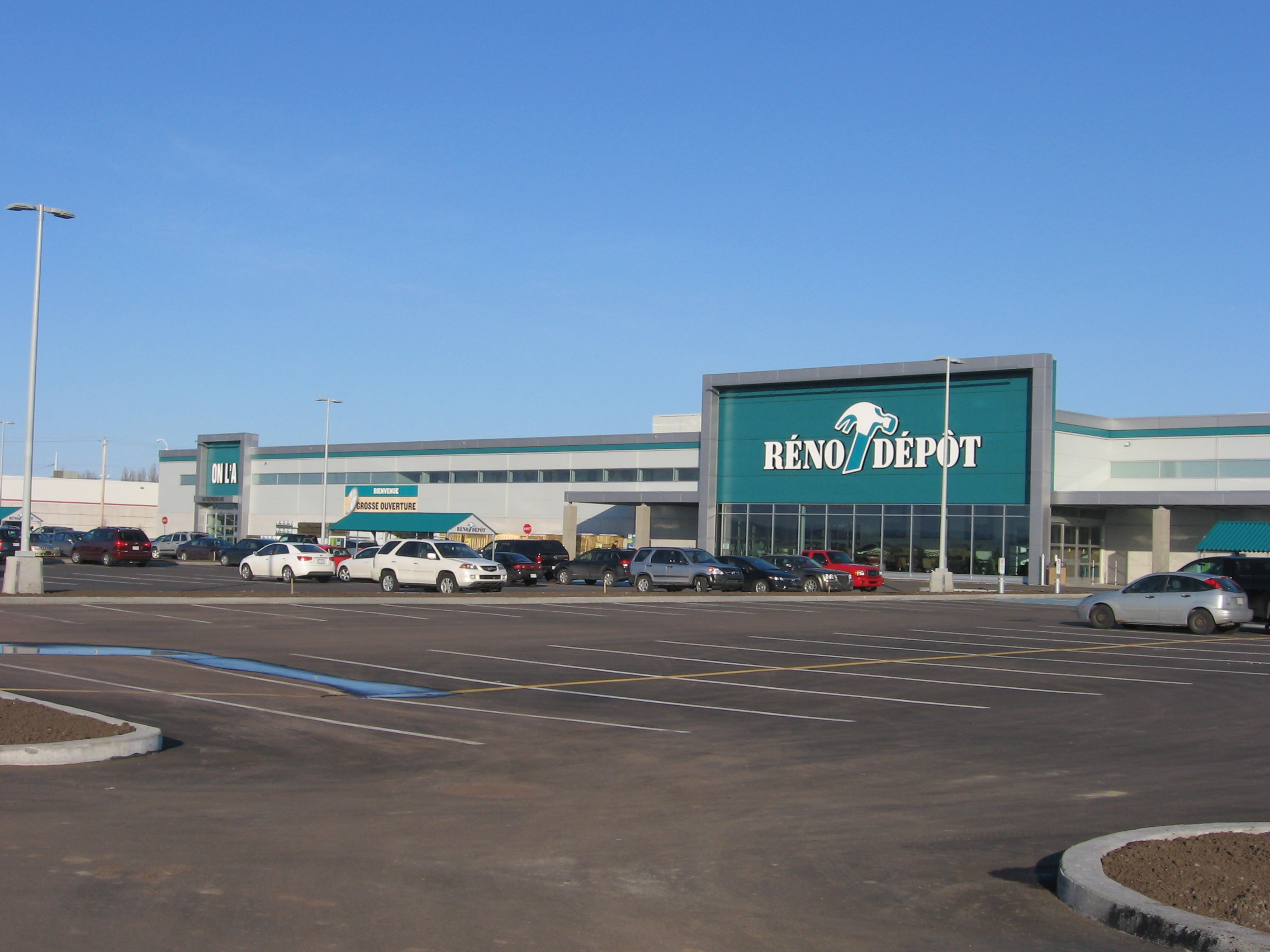
Réno-Dépôt in Sainte-Foy, Quebec

=== First years ===
In May 1992, Groupe Val Royal with its partner Aikenhead's, both owned by the Molson Companies (the former in part, the latter as a subsidiary), announced the creation of warehouse stores under the name of Réno-Dépôt inspired straight from the Home Depot chain in the United States.

The first location opened in Brossard. After the Brossard store, Montréal welcomed its first branch location in August 1993, in Anjou. In 1994, two other stores opened their doors: Laval and Pointe-Claire, followed by Marché Central (Montréal) and Québec City in 1995. That same year, the company itself changed its name to Réno-Dépôt. In 1996, a new location was established in Saint-Hubert.

=== Acquisition and expansion outside Quebec ===
In April 1997, the two majority shareholders of Réno-Dépôt Inc., the Michaud family and Molson Companies Limited, sold their interest in the company to the French group Castorama. In 1998, the British group Kingfisher plc acquired a large block of shares from Castorama to become the majority shareholder. In 1999, Réno-Dépôt opened a location in LaSalle and, the following year, entered the Ontario market under the English-language banner The Building Box.

In September 2003, Rona Inc. acquired Réno-Dépôt; following the merger, the Ontario-based Building Box stores were re-branded as Rona Home & Garden. The purchase was part of a plan to establish more "big box" stores to accompany its smaller specialty outlets and compete with the U.S.-based chain The Home Depot.

=== Relaunch, closure ===
In 2013, in the wake of cuts across the company, the Réno-Dépôt chain was re-positioned as a discount wholesale-focused banner with a reduced product selection. In 2015, Rona announced that the brand would expand outside of Quebec with the re-opening of shuttered Rona locations in Calgary and Aurora, Ontario as Reno-Depot. However, both locations were announced for closure in 2018 and 2019 respectively, leaving the chain once again restricted to Quebec.

In 2024, Rona began to once again phase out the banner, this time in favour of its flagship Rona+ banner (which originally replaced Lowe's Canada after its acquisition by Sycamore Partners). This process began with the Hull store on March 2024, and the Charlemagne and Sherbrooke locations in April. In October 2024, all remaining Réno-Dépôt stores were replaced by Rona+.
