= Karaoke Star Jr. =

- Judges: Danny Fernandes; Tara Oram
- Country of origin: Canada
- No. of seasons: 1
- No. of episodes: 10

Production
- Running time: 60 minutes

Original release
- Network: YTV; CMT
- Release: March 16 – May 19, 2009

Karaoke Star Jr. is a reality television show for children that airs on YTV and CMT. This show is just like the show Karaoke Star, except it features kids instead of adults. It is hosted by Paul McGuire (CMT) and Phil Guerrero (YTV). The purpose of the show is to discover Canada's first ever Karaoke Star Jr. The show premiered on YTV and CMT on March 16, 2009 at 7pm ET. New episodes of the show now air every Monday on these stations. Jaimee is the winner from the first season.

== Gameplay ==
The show travelled to eight Canadian cities: Vancouver, Edmonton, Saskatoon, Winnipeg, Toronto, Ottawa, Halifax, and St. John's. There, young singers between the age of 6 and 15 could audition. In each one, five singers (seven in Toronto) were selected to sing in front of the judges. Then the public voted by SMS for their favourite singer from each city. These eight singers will be competing in the show's finale.

Singers could also audition online by uploading a video of them singing. The public also voted for their favourite cyberstar. The one who got the most votes will be joining the eight singers in the finale. The judges also got to choose their favourite cyberstar; he/she will also be competing in the finale.

These ten singers will travel to Calgary, where they will sing in the Performance Showdown on May 18. The public will then vote for their favourite one. After that, in the Finale on the next day, the announced winner (determined by who got the most votes) will win the grand prize of $5000.

== Judges ==
The show has two permanent judges that go to every city where the show goes. These judges are: R&B singer Danny Fernandes, and Canadian Idol finalist Tara Oram. There is also an additional guest judge in every city. These are the guest judges:

- Vancouver: Josh Ramsay
- Edmonton: Kreesha Turner
- Saskatoon: Josh Palmer
- Winnipeg: Rusty Matyas
- Toronto: Nathan Ferraro
- Ottawa: Luke Doucet
- Halifax: Rebekah Higgs
- St. John's: Rex Goudie

== Cities ==
Karaoke Star Junior travelled to these cities where singers could audition:

=== Vancouver ===
This was the first city which the show visited.

Finalist - Viewer Voted: Geena from Burnaby, BC

Other singers who performed in front of the judges:

- Emily from Maple Ridge, BC
- Sammi from Maple Ridge, BC
- Nicole from Maple Ridge, BC
- DianaLyn from Vancouver, BC
- Serefina from Abbotsford, BC
- Jenna from Langley, BC
- Arden from Surrey, BC

=== Edmonton ===
This was the second city that the show visited.

Finalist - Viewer Voted: Mieke from Edmonton, AB.

Other contestants who performed in front of the judges:

- Daylin from St. Albert, AB
- Chris Meredith from Airdrie, AB
- Prestina from Edmonton, AB
- Kristen from Edmonton, AB
- Andrea from Edmonton, AB

=== Saskatoon ===
This is the third city that the show visited.

Finalist - Viewer Voted: Tenille from Weyburn, SK.

Other contestants who performed in front of the judges:

- Michelle from Saskatoon, SK
- Wynter from Medicine Hat, AB
- Grace from Moose Jaw, SK
- Alexandra from Saskatoon, SK

=== Winnipeg ===
This is the fourth city the show visited.

Finalist- Viewer Voted: Andrea from Winnipeg, MB

Other Contestants who performed in front of the judges were:

- Emily from Dryden, ON
- April Rose from Winnipeg, MB
- Moises from Winnipeg, MB
- Samantha from Winnipeg, MB

=== Toronto ===
This is the fourth city that the show visited.

Finalist - Viewer Voted: Natalie from Sudbury, ON

Other contestants who performed in front of the judges:

- Destiny from Wasaga Beach, ON
- Stephanie from London, ON
- Adam Gauthier from Windsor, ON
- Atileo from Brampton, ON
- Cassiddy from Ancaster, ON
- Philon from Mississauga, ON

=== Ottawa ===
This is the fifth city that the show visited.

Finalist - Viewer Voted: RJ

Other contestants who performed in front of the judges:

=== Halifax ===
This is the sixth city that the show visited.

Finalist - Viewer Voted: Brianna

Other contestants who performed in front of the judges:

- Jordin from New Germany, NS
- Noemie from New Brunswick
- Lindsay from Halifax, NS
- Corey from Yarmouth, NS

=== St. John's ===
This is the last city that the show visited.

Finalist - Viewer Voted: Jamiee from L'Anse-au-Clair, Newfoundland and Labrador

Other contestants who performed in front of the judges:

- Damian from Main Brook, NL
- Kayla from Marystown, NL
- Alexandria from Portugal Cove, NL
- Amber from Botwood, NL
