= Rachel Zimmerman =

21st-century Canadian space scientist and inventor

- Born: Rachel Zimmerman; 1972 (age 53–54); London, Ontario, Canada

Academic background
- Education: Brandeis University; International Space University

Academic work
- Institutions: NASA Jet Propulsion Laboratory

Rachel Zimmerman Brachman (born Zimmerman; 1972) is a Canadian and American space scientist, educator, and inventor. She invented the "Blissymbol Printer" in 1984-86, making it simple for users with physical disabilities to communicate. A user can choose various Blissymbols to convey their thoughts and the printer translates those images to written text. Her invention was recognized worldwide and she has received several awards for her achievements.

Blissymbols were invented by Charles Bliss in the 1940s; however, it was only until the mid-1960s when people with disabilities started using Blissymbols to communicate, and it only became accessible until the 1980s. Blissymbols were traditionally used by having people pointing to a symbol that conveys what they are trying to say and then an assistant would translate. It was Brachman's invention the Blissymbol Printer that made it simpler for non-verbal people, such as those with severe physical disabilities like cerebral palsy, to communicate. The Blissymbol Printer allows people to choose various Blissymbols to convey their thoughts and the printer would translate those images into written text.

== Life ==
She was born Rachel Zimmerman in London, Ontario. From a young age she showed great interest in art, debate, music, math, and especially science. As a 12-year-old student at St. George's public school, Zimmerman Brachman developed a software program using Blissymbols. Zimmerman Brachman's original science project idea lead to her winning a silver medal at the Canada-Wide Science Fair (1985) and it was showcased in Bulgaria at the World Exhibition of Achievements of Young Inventors, and she also received YTV Achievement Award. She studied and graduated from London Central Secondary School. Zimmerman went on to earn a BA in physics from Brandeis University in 1995. During her time at Brandeis, she co-founded the Women in Science Club. Then, she completed a master's degree in Space Studies from the International Space University in Strasbourg, France in 1998. With her interest in space technology and assistive intelligence, Brachman now works at NASA Jet Propulsion Laboratory with a goal of tailoring NASA innovations to the needs of people with disabilities.

== Scientific career ==
In 1984, Rachel Zimmerman at age 12, at St. George's public school in London, Ontario, Canada, invented a device called the Blissymbol printer, which used a unique software program to translate Blissymbols tapped on a board into clear written language on a computer, which allow the disabled to easily communicate with others. Brachman originally developed a software program using Blissymbols for her sixth-grade school science fair project. She took the already existing Blissymbols system of pointing to the symbol and added a touch-sensitive Atari tablet into a Blissymbol touchpad. She also added a printer that allows people to print out what they wrote. This made it easier for people to communicate independently. Additionally, instead of using an assistant to translate the symbols, people could just simply push the symbol and the Blissymbol Printer would translate it into written word on a computer screen. Now, the system could be used in other languages, including French. Voice output has also been added. It is still used in Canada, Sweden, Israel, and the United Kingdom.

Her "Blissymbol Printer" is catered to those with severe physical disabilities, such as cerebral palsy, as it provides a facile method of communication. A user can simply point to various symbols on a page or board through the use of a special touch pad. When the user chooses a symbol, the Blissymbol Printer converts the image to written English or French; allowing their thoughts to be transcribed effectively. Her invention had begun as a project for a school science fair and she won the silver medal at the 1985 Canada-Wide Science Fair, showcased at the World Exhibition of Achievement of Young Inventors, she also won the YTV Achievement Award for Innovation.

Before the Blissymbol Printer was invented, it was a long and slow process since there must be an assistant watching people pointing to the symbols, and the people who cannot speak may also have poor motor control. With the Blissymbol Printer, everything is more convenient since the computer has infinite patience. Furthermore, the Blissymbol Printer made it more affordable to schools and families. The only software available for people who used Blissymbols before was on a system that cost around $10,000. However, the Blissymbol Printer Brachman designed only cost about $500, which is affordable for both school or home use.

Brachman has worked in various institutions, including the NASA Ames Research Center, the Canadian Space Agency, The Planetary Society and the California Institute of Technology. However, most of her works she has done has been with NASA. From 2003-2025, she worked as an education and public outreach specialist with the Jet Propulsion Laboratory in Pasadena, California on projects such as Earth and exoplanet citizen science and international essay contests about moons of the outer solar system for students in fifth to twelfth grade. Her goal was to teach the public about space exploration. She also worked for NASA Ames Research Center, focusing on combining space exploration innovations with assistive technology development for people who have disabilities. Many of her works have been published in The Planetary Report, the Journal of the National Space Society, and the NASA's Ames Research Center Astrogram. Rachel led a teacher professional development workshops at both the National Science Teaching Association and the California Science Teachers Association annual conferences. She was also the president and national conference chair of an organization called Science Education for Students with Disabilities. More recently, she has worked on public engagement for the Radioisotope Power Systems program and the Cassini-Huygens mission to Saturn and Titan.

Since 2003, Zimmerman has been employed as Solar System and Technology Education and Public Outreach Specialist at NASA's Jet Propulsion Laboratory. Using her connections made from the International Space University, Zimmerman organized a Saturn essay contest for middle school and high school students in over 50 countries. Her work has been published in the Planetary Report, the Journal of the National Space Society and NASA's Ames Research Center Astrogram. Zimmerman has worked on Radioisotope Power System Public Engagement as well as formal education for the Cassini-Huygens Mission to Saturn and Titan. Rachel leads teacher professional development workshops at National Science Teaching Association and California Science Teachers Association annual conferences. From 2013 to 2016, Rachel was president of Science Education for Students with Disabilities.

Her goal today is "trying to make sure the next generation, who loves space as much as I do, want to learn more about the missions that are going on right now."

== Awards ==
In 2011, Zimmerman received the Visionary Award of the Women in Film and Television Showcase at the Toronto International Film Festival.

Rachel won a Primetime Emmy Award in 2017-18 for the Cassini End of Mission coverage for the mission to Saturn.
