= Elissa Lansdell =

Canadian television personality

- Occupation: Television personality

Elissa Lansdell is a Canadian television personality currently based in Toronto, Ontario. She was a correspondent for CMT Canada and hosted My Rona Home on City.

Lansdell began her television career as an associate producer for The Camilla Scott Show on the CTV television network. She then began working in front of the camera, reporting on weather at The Weather Network in Toronto and The New RO in Ottawa.

In 2002, she moved to CMT Canada to co-host CMT Central alongside Stu Jeffries. While working as a correspondent at the 2003 Country Music Association Awards, she met Lonestar drummer Keech Rainwater and the two were married in September 2004. They had one child, Amélie, in 2006, and divorced in 2010.
