= Nicole Luiken =

Canadian science fiction and speculative fiction author

- Born: 25 May 1971 (age 54) Manning, Alberta, Canada
- Occupation: Author
- Genre: Sci Fi, Adventure, Suspense, Young Adult fiction, Adult fiction

Nicole Luiken (born 25 May 1971) is a Canadian science fiction and speculative fiction author of novels for teens and adults. She worked as a librarian for several years before giving it up to write full-time. She currently lives in Edmonton, Alberta with her husband Aaron and sons Simon and Luke. She had published her first two novels by the time she was in grade 11. Nicole's novel Unlocking the Doors won her a YTV Achievement Award for writing in 1989.

== Young adult novels ==
- Unlocking the Doors (Scholastic, 1988)
- Escape to the Overworlds (Treefrog, 1988)
- Catalyst (Treefrog, 1989)
- Violet Eyes (Pocket, 2001)
- Silver Eyes (Pocket, 2001)
- Frost (Great Plains, 2007)
- Dreamfire (Great Plains, 2009)
- Dreamline (Great Plains, 2011)
- Angel Eyes (self-published, 2013)
- Golden Eyes (2016)

== Adult novels ==
- Running on Instinct (Tor, 2001; writing as N. M. Luiken)
- Gate to Kandrith (ebook, Carina Press, 2012)
- Soul of Kandrith (ebook, Carina Press, 2013)

== Forthcoming books ==
- Besieged by Demons (Harlequin Reckonings, release date unknown)
