= The Anti-Gravity Room =

Television series

The Anti-Gravity Room is a weekly Canadian television program that aired from 1995 to 1997, spotlighting comic books and video games, and hosted by Nick Scoullar and Phil Guerrero. It was produced by YTV in Canada, and was carried in the United States on the Sci-Fi Channel. It featured interviews with international comic creators, coverage of comic events, reviews of video games, and guest hosts such as Ben Stiller and Kevin Smith.

== History ==
Nick started his first show, TALKCOMICS, in 1993 with his best friend Milan Dale. It was a call-in show which aired on the public-access television station Manhattan Neighborhood Network(MNN). Viewers would call in with questions on comic books and host Nick Scoullar would answer them.

Word of the show got around and it was jointly picked up by Canada's YTV, America's Fremantle Corporation and Sci-Fi channel, and turned into The Anti-Gravity Room. The show was expanded into more of a news/information show that still covered comics, but also more literature, games, movies and music. Two more hosts were added: Phil Guerrero and Shashi Bhatia. Nick was based in New York City, Phil in Toronto and Shashi in Los Angeles.

Shashi would later be replaced by Jaimy Mahlon over the course of the series' two-year run. Other hosts included Eugenie Vincent, Aashna Patel, Patricia Ribeiro and Jackie Farry.

The fifth and final season of The Anti-Gravity Room only aired on YTV, as the Sci-Fi Channel decided to cancel the series early.

It was followed with the spiritual-sequel series, Warp, which premiered on September 17, 1998 on YTV. It featured many of the same production crew as The Anti-Gravity Room, but was only a YTV production as Sci-Fi Channel was no longer involved. Unlike The Anti-Gravity Room, which was focused on comics, Warp covered a range of topics in sci-fi, pop-culture, television, movies and technology. Phil continued as host and was joined by fellow YTV personality Paul McGuire. Nick continued to host some segments. Jennifer Racicot (aka PJ Katie) hosted segments called Real Warped which highlighted movies.
