= YTV Achievement Awards =

- Country: Canada
- Presented by: YTV
- First award: 1989
- Final award: 2000

The YTV Achievement Awards (aka YAA!) was an annual awards ceremony presented by YTV. The ceremony took place annually (except 1991) from 1989 to 2000. The awards were given to young Canadians who had an important contribution in one of several diverse categories.

For each awards year, there is a nomination period. Entrants could nominate themselves, or be nominated by someone else. Nominees were required to be 19 or younger. Finalists and winners in each category were selected from the nominees list by a panel of judges.

== Award categories ==
- Acting
- Band/Musical Group
- Bravery
- Business / Entrepreneurship
- Dance
- Environmental
- Innovation / Science & Technology
- Instrumental
- President's Award
- Public Service
- Specialty Performance
- Sports
- Terry Fox Award
- Visual Arts
- Vocal
- Writing

== Dates and locations ==
#	Year	Date	City	Venue	Host(s)
1st	1989	3 November	Toronto, Ontario	Metro Toronto Convention Centre	Jim Carrey
2nd	1990	2 November	Toronto, Ontario	Metro Toronto Convention Centre	Laurie Hibberd and Derek McGrath
3rd	1992	11 March	Ottawa, Ontario	National Arts Centre	Alan Thicke and Laurie Hibberd
4th	1993	22 April	Ottawa, Ontario	National Arts Centre	Andrea Martin
5th	1994	16 April	Ottawa, Ontario	National Arts Centre	"Tarzan" Dan Freeman and "Weird Al" Yankovic
6th	1995	6 April (broadcast on YTV on 8 April)	Ottawa, Ontario	National Arts Centre	"Tarzan" Dan Freeman, Phil Guerrero and Eva Preger
7th	1996	28 April	Toronto, Ontario	Metro Toronto Convention Centre	Larisa Oleynik, Phil Guerrero and Paul McGuire
8th	1997	27 April	Toronto, Ontario	Metro Toronto Convention Centre	Paul McGuire and Aashna Patel
9th	1998	19 April	Toronto, Ontario	Metro Toronto Convention Centre	Caroline Rhea, Shaun Majumder and Paul McGuire
10th	1999	6 June	Ottawa, Ontario	National Arts Centre	Ben Savage, Danielle Fishel, Paul McGuire and Phil Guerrero
11th	2000	28 May	Toronto, Ontario	Metro Toronto Convention Centre	Curt Harnett, Jennifer Katie Racicot and Pat Kelly

== Awards ==
=== 1st Annual YTV Achievement Awards (1989) ===
Winners are listed first, highlighted in boldface, and indicated with a double dagger (‡).

**Acting**: **Zachary Ansley –BC**‡	**Band/Musical Group**: **Imamu Baraka (Mike Weaver, Steve Dawson, Jeff Hicks, Krister Kott-meier and Tim Rutledge) –Vancouver, BC**‡
**Bravery**: **Joe Philion –Orillia, ON**‡	**Business/Entrepreneurship**: **Jason Goldberg –Winnipeg, MB**‡
**Comedy**: **The Young Street Players –Toronto, ON**‡	**Dance**: **Amanda Daft –Delta, BC**‡
**Environmental**: **Shannon Bard –West Vancouver, BC**‡	**Innovation/Science & Technology**: **Joshua Richmond –Dresden, ON**‡
**Instrumental**	**Public Service**: **Melanie Goodchild –Thunder Bay, ON**‡
**Sports**: **Laurie Shong –BC**‡	**Terry Fox Award**: **Shandra Leavitt –Musquash, NB.**‡
**Visual Arts**: **Hayden Thomas –Vancouver, BC**‡	**Vocal**
**Writing**: **Nicole Luiken –AB**‡	

=== 2nd Annual YTV Achievement Awards (1990) ===
Winners are listed first, highlighted in boldface, and indicated with a double dagger (‡).

**Acting**: **Emily Perkins –Vancouver, BC**‡	**Band/Musical Group**: **Barenaked Ladies –Scarborough, ON**‡
**Bravery**: **Students from Lambton-Kent Composite School –Dresden, ON**‡	**Business/Entrepreneurship**
**Dance**: TIE: **Lisa Jones - Calgary, AB & The Canadian Children's Dance Theatre -Toronto, ON** ‡	**Environmental**: **Marc Kielburger –Thornhill, ON**‡
**Innovation/Science & Technology**: **Rachel Zimmerman –London, ON**‡	**Instrumental**: **Karen Wong –Vancouver, BC**‡
**Public Service**: **Gregory Gillespie –Oshawa, ON**‡	**Specialty Performance**: **Gord 'n Jase (Gordon Magee and Jason Overy) –Victoria, BC**‡
**Sports**: **Ian Power - Summerside, PEI**	**Terry Fox Award**: **Tara Lynne Touesnard –NS**
**Visual Arts**: **Alec Stevenson –Toronto, ON**‡	**Vocal**: **Selena Grouse –Toronto, ON**‡
**Writing**: **Nadine Shelly –Fulford Harbour, BC**‡

=== 3rd Annual YTV Achievement Awards (1992) ===
Winners are listed first, highlighted in boldface, and indicated with a double dagger (‡).

**Acting**: **Sarah Sawatsky –Vancouver, BC**‡	**Band/Musical Group**: **The Smugglers –Vancouver, BC**‡
**Bravery**: **David James –Pitt Meadows, BC**‡	**Business/Entrepreneurship**: **Jennifer McCleery;–Whitby, ON**‡
**Dance**: **Darren and Lara Lynn Lacey –Regina, SK**‡	**Environmental**: **Student Action for a Viable Environment (SAVE) –Vancouver, BC**‡
**Innovation/Science & Technology**: **Doug Olafson – Winnipeg, MB**‡	**Instrumental**: **Naida Cole –Toronto, ON**‡
**Public Service**: **Lisa Taylor;–Grand Falls, NF**‡	**Specialty Performance**: **Stacey Singe;–Regina, SK**‡
**Sports**: **Clara Hughes –MB**‡	**Terry Fox Award**: **Joey Saccary –Glace Bay, NS**‡
**Visual Arts**: **Danielle Currie –Victoria, BC**‡	**Vocal**: **Lisa Brokop;–Surrey, BC**‡
**Writing**: **Charles Jason Wilcox;–Fredericton, NB**‡

=== 4th Annual YTV Achievement Awards (1993) ===
Winners are listed first, highlighted in boldface, and indicated with a double dagger (‡).

**Acting**: **Annie Galipeau –Messines, QC**‡	**Band/Musical Group**: **The Dervishes –Kitchener, ON**‡
**Bravery**: **Jocelyn McDonald –Minaki, ON**‡	**Entrepreneurship**: **Christopher Caldwell –London, ON**‡
**Dance**: **Christine O'Leary –Toronto, ON**‡	**Environmental**: **Neal Graham –Lower Sackville, NS**‡
**Innovation/Science & Technology**: **Rochan Sankar –Brossard, QC**‡	**Instrumental**: **Stewart Goodyear –Thornhill, ON**‡
**Public Service**: **Angela Walkley –Whitehorse, YT**‡	**Specialty Performance**: **Cirque du Soleil** (Jinnu Jacinto, Laurence Racine-Chouinière, Nadine Louis-Binette et Isabelle Chassé) ‡
**Sports**: **Tracey Ferguson –Markham, ON**‡; Lindsay Staniforth	**Terry Fox Award**: **Cindy Wall –St. John's, NL**‡
**Visual Arts**: **Andrew J. Wong –Vancouver, BC**‡	**Vocal**: **Tamia Washington – Windsor, ON**‡
**Writing**: **Nicholas Woo –Clearbrook, BC**‡	**YTV President's Award for Outstanding Achievement**: **Virginie Larivière –St. Polycarpe, QU**‡

=== 5th Annual YTV Achievement Awards (1994) ===
Winners are listed first, highlighted in boldface, and indicated with a double dagger (‡).

**Acting**: **Steve Gendron –QC**‡	**Band/Musical Group**: TIE **Gypsy Soul –Toronto, ON** & **Seventh Stone –Victoria, BC**‡
**Bravery**: **Amelia Peter-Paul -P.E.I.**‡	**Business/Entrepreneurship**: **Marc Boutet - Ste. Foy, QC**‡
**Dance**: **Matthias Sperling - Toronto, ON**‡	**Environmental**: **Diana Steffen and Linda Hoogendoorn -BC**‡
**Innovation/Science & Technology**: **Samir Gupta and Denis Tsui -QC**‡	**Instrumental**: **Marc-Andre Gauthier -Longueuil, QC**‡
**Public Service**: **Denise Campbell -ON**‡	**Specialty Performance**: **Emilie Grenon-Emiroglou -Brossard, QC & Genevieve Bessette -Montreal, QC**‡
**Sports**: **Marc Gagnon -QC**‡; Peter Marcelli, Stouffville, ON	**Terry Fox Award**: **Brad DeLore -Moose Jaw, SK** ‡
**Visual Arts**: **Zoe Mackenzie -Gibsons, BC**‡	**Vocal**: **Marie-Alice Depestre -Laval, QC**‡
**Writing**: **Sheila Heti -Toronto, ON** ‡	**President's Award**

=== 6th Annual YTV Achievement Awards (1995) ===
Winners are listed first, highlighted in boldface, and indicated with a double dagger (‡).

**Acting**: **Ashleigh Aston Moore –Vancouver, BC**‡	**Band/Musical Group**: **Noir Silence – Saint-Georges, QC**‡
**Bravery**: **Cristia Dudman Tiverton, ON**‡	**Business/Entrepreneurship**: **Adam Spiers –Red Deer, AL**‡
**Dance**: **Marjash Mrozewski –Sudbury, ON**‡	**Environmental**: **Paul Brown and Anie Galipeau –Ottawa, ON**‡
**Innovation/Science & Technology**: **Chris Heyn and Rarn "Puvi" Puvanesasingham –London, ON**‡	**Instrumental**: **Antoine LeFebvre –St-Lambert, QC**‡
**Public Service**: **Jason DuBois –Rosetown, SK**‡	**Specialty Performance**: **Preston Pashe –Portage la Prairie, MB**‡
**Sports**: **Trevor Nash –Binbrook, ON**‡	**Terry Fox Award**: **Jean-Dominic Levesque-Rene –Blizard, QC**‡
**Visual Arts**: **Byron Hodgins –London, ON**‡	**Vocal**: TIE **Measha Gosman –Fredericton, NB** & **Tara Lyn Mohr –Roblin, MB**‡
**Writing**: **Elise Moore –Winnipeg, MB**‡	**President's Award**: **Manisha Barti –Cornwall, ON**‡

=== 7th Annual YTV Achievement Awards (1996) ===
Winners are listed first, highlighted in boldface, and indicated with a double dagger (‡).

**Acting**: **Aidan Pendleton – North Vancouver, BC**‡	**Band/Musical Group**: **Plumtree –Halifax, NS**‡; Circut –Nepean, ON; d.b.s. –Vancouver, BC; Half Size Giants –Orleans, ON; Made In Québec –Valcourt, QC; Men 'O' Steel –Sainte-Julie, QC; Prozac –Windsor, NS; Reset –Laval, QC; Sisters Cherrie –Toronto, ON; President's Choice –Port Williams, NS
**Bravery**: **Stanley Houle & Earl Okemow –Peerless Lake, AB**‡	**Business/Entrepreneurship**: **Shane Cuddington –Manor, SK**‡
**Dance**: **Jamie Tapper –AB**‡	**Environmental**: **David Grassby –Thornhill, ON**‡
**Innovation/Science & Technology**: **Sharon Cushing and Julie Desjardins – ON**‡	**Instrumental**: **Sonia Chan**‡
**Public Service**: **Steve Kent –Mount Pearl, NL**‡	**Specialty Performance**: TIE: **Gods of Rhythm –Montreal, QC** & **Gordon McKeeman –New Glasgow, NS**‡; Émile Carey –Montreal, QC
**Sports**: **Estella Warren – Mississauga, ON** ‡	**Terry Fox Award**: **Aaron Wong-Sing – Vancouver, BC** ‡
**Visual Arts**: **Eric Fehlberg – ON** ‡	**Vocal**: **Rebecca Miller – ON**‡
**Writing**: **Lindsay Beyerstein – Port Moody, BC** ‡; Casie Stewart	**President's Award**: **Craig Kielburger –Thornhill, ON**‡

=== 8th Annual YTV Achievement Awards (1997) ===
Winners are listed first, highlighted in boldface, and indicated with a double dagger (‡).

**Acting**: **Colleen Rennison –Vancouver, BC**‡; Maggie Blake –Queenston, ON; Margot Finley –Vancouver, BC; Brendan Fletcher –Courtenay, BC; Martha MacIsaac –Charlottetown, PE; Marie-France Monette –Montreal, ON; Joel Palmer –Langley, BC; Jewel Staite –Vancouver, BC; Stuart Stone –Toronto, ON; Dan Warry-Smith –Toronto, ON	**Band/Musical Group**: **Soup –Halifax, NS**‡; F-Jam –Coquitlam, BC; Kermess –Coaticook, QC; The McAuley Boys –London, ON; Les Mouches Noires –St-Boniface, MB; Pedestrian –Dartmouth, NS; Supercar –Cornwall, PE
**Bravery**: **Steve Marcoux –Victoriaville, QC**‡; Tara Cassidy –Aylmer, QC; Kelly Cheater & Kris Cheater –Stoughton, SK; Trevor Hunter, Sabrina Vincent –Moosonee, ON; Christine Wesley, Ashley Wynne; Kerry Klingbeil –Cloverdale, BC; Pierre-Luc Martial –Notre-Dame-de-Bon-Secours, QC; Brian McWilliams –Don Mills, ON; The Parolin Children –Princeton, BC; Johnny Racine –Alma, QC; Reese Risdon & John Rutherford –Strathmore, AB; Christopher Wice –Angus, ON	**Business/Entrepreneurship**: **Christy Panylyk & Carlee Panylyk –Hinton, AB**‡; Don Aiken –Red Lake, ON; Chad Bardsley –Tecumseh, ON; Aleem Dhanani –Calgary, AB; Carrie Donovan, Morgan Hicks, Mary Middleton, Michael Sponagle –Mount Uniacke, NS; B.J. Hay & Aaron Wrightly –Havelock, ON; Julie-Andrée Hébert & Marie-Claude Hébert –Victoriaville, QC; Alim Jiwa & Shafin Tejani –Vancouver, BC; Benjamin Lefebvre –Trois-Rivières, QC; Liam Wilson –Conception Bay, NF
**Dance**: **Brianne Bland –Vancouver, BC**‡; Alyssa Bonic –Toronto, ON; Stephanie Cadman & Nicolas Dromard –Nepean, ON; Laurie Cahoon –Sherwood Park, AB; Jennifer Jimenez –Ottawa, ON; Travis Knights –Dollard-des-Ormeaux, QC; Stacey Martin –Nepean, ON; Colleen Rintamaki –Pickering, ON; Adrienne Serr –Thornhill, ON; Kanchana Sastri –Oakville, ON	**Environmental**: **Pamela Penton & Shelley Penton –Fogo Island, NF**‡; Julien Brazeau & Jean-Sébastien Ledoux –Orleans & Gloucester, ON; Jonathan Clark –Devon, AB; Corinne Goyetche –West Bay, NS; Fiona Grant –Victoria, BC; Enviroworks –Kingston, ON; Larry Kim –Winnipeg, MB; Sabrina Perri –Saint-Leonard, QC; Carl Rothfels –Pefferlaw, ON; Robin Walsh –Fairview, AB
**Innovation/Science & Technology**: **Sabrina Perri –Saint-Leonard, QC**‡; Eric Bellotti –Dollard-des-Ormeaux, QC; Andrew Deonarine –Winnipeg, MB; Haïgo Djambazian –Montreal, QC; Christine Ichim –Kitchener, ON; Malgorzata Kaminska –Cumberland Township, ON; Asad Khan –Hamilton, ON; Vijay Pandurangan –Brossard, QC; Dinen Subramaniam –Winnipeg, MB; Andrea Wan –Sarnia, ON	**Instrumental**: **Benjamin Bowman –Toronto, ON**‡; Stepan Arman –Renforth, NB; Edward Choi –Calgary, AB; The Crown Trio (Andrea Case, Emily Fowler, Irene Wong) –Calgary, AB; Ori Friedman –Thornhill, ON; Jessica Linnebach –Edmonton, AB; Ian Parker –Burnaby, BC; Dantonio Pisano –St-Jean-sur-Richlieu, QC; Patrice Servant –Buckingham, QC; April Dawn Verch –Pembroke, ON
**Public Service**: **Nava Mizrahi –Vancouver, BC**‡; Tajesh Adhihetty –Edmonton, AB; Jasan Dhanota –East York, ON; Christine Ichim –Kitchener, ON; Jennifer Machado –Toronto, ON; Christopher McKibbin –Winnipeg, MB; Lisa Monkman –Winnipeg, MB; Chau Pham –Winnipeg, MB; Kimberly Richard –Pierrefonds, QC; Monica Tran –Aurora, ON	**Specialty Performance**: **Travis Knights –Dollard-des-Ormeaux, QC**‡; Émile Carey –Montreal, QC; Martyne Dubé –Montreal, QC; Émilie Dion & Catherine Viens –Boucherville & Rosemere, QC; F.IV –Montreal, QC; Austin Garrick –Toronto, ON; Mathew Johnson –Stratford, ON; Christian Laramée –Montreal, QC; Jordan Lemon & Nicholas Lemon –Woodstock, ON; Jeremy Olson –Coquitlam, BC; Caroline Théroux –St-Hyacinthe, QC; Y B Normal? –Aylmer, QC
**Sports**: **Joseph Radmore –Kemptville, ON**‡; Maxime Boilard –Lac Beauport, QC; Mark Boswell –Brampton, ON; Petra Cada –Halifax, NS; Jessica Deglau –Vancouver, BC; Jeane Lassen –Whitehorse, YT; Jennifer Mickelson –Collingwood, ON; Natasha Quan-Vie –Calgary, AB; Cristina Popescu –Montreal, QC; Yvonne Tousek –Cambridge, ON	**Terry Fox Award**: **Kimberly Richard –Pierrefonds, QC**‡; Jon Paul Blenke –Leduc, AB; Michael Cuccione –Coquitlam, BC; Kristin Hayes –Markham, ON; Ryan Hoskins –Edmonton, AB; Simon Ibell –Victoria, BC; Sébastien Lepage –Drummondville, QC; Norma Jean MacPhee –Sydney, NS; Jennifer-Lynn Newman –London, ON; Harisuthan Subramaniam –Scarborough, ON
**Visual Arts**: **Michelle Irving –Halifax, NS**‡; Dominic Bercier –Ottawa, ON; Tamara Chatterjee-Chatelain –Toronto, ON; Mélanie Couture –Tracy, QC; Rita Godlevskis –Toronto, ON; Émilie Goulet –St.Lambert, QC; Claudine Leclerc –Pont-Rouge, QC; Stéphane Leclerc –Pont-Rouge, QC; Howie Shia –Saskatoon, SK; Dan Soelberg –Oakville, ON; Sarah Troper –Toronto, ON; Cory Van Groningen –Port Dover, ON	**Vocal**: **Holy Heart of Mary Chamber Choir –St.John's, NF**‡; Kendall Docherty –Pinette, PE; Mark Donelly –Ottawa, ON; Audrey Gagnon –Jonquière, QC; Anique Granger –Saskatoon, SK; Tyler Hamilton –Sherwood Park, AB; Amber Lemouel –Yellowknife, NT; Leon Leontaridis –Surrey, BC; Belinda Munro –Toronto, ON; Ann Marie Schreiner –Hull, QC; Lawnie Wallace –Stoufville, ON
**Writing**: **Jérôme Gariépy –Montreal, QC**‡; Nicholas Billon –Montreal, QC; Julie Gobeil –Windsor, QC; Royden Kadyschuk –Saskatoon, SK; Gregory Lane –Maple Ridge, BC; Laura MacDonald –Halifax, NS; Amanda Olliver –St.Lazare, QC; Charlotte Stewart –Victoria, BC; Zachary-Evan Wychopen –Edmonton, AB; Trudy-Ann Young –Toronto, ON	

=== 9th Annual YTV Achievement Awards (1998) ===
Winners are listed first, highlighted in boldface, and indicated with a double dagger (‡).

**Acting**: **Jacob Tierney –Toronto, ON**‡; Lawrence Arcouette –Montreal, QC; Lani Billard –Thornhill, ON; Margot Finley –Vancouver, BC; Brendan Fletcher –Vancouver, BC; Meredith Henderson –Orleans, ON; Dave G. Kirschner –Ft. McMurray, AB; Kathryn Long –Mississauga, ON; Martha MacIsaac –Charlottetown, PEI; Kevin Zegers –Woodstock, ON	**Band/Musical Group**: **Astrokick –Kitchener, ON**‡; Ad Vitam St. Foy, Quebec; Liars & Thieves –Dartmouth, NS; Limestone –Victoria, BC; The Ludes –Elmira, ON; Pedestrian –Dartmouth, NS; STARR –Peterborough, ON; Test-Tube Babies –Cape Breton, NS; Thred –Unionville, ON; Undermind Authority –Grand Prairie, AB
**Bravery**: **Ashford Penner –North Battleford, SK**‡; Bryan Balkam –Oxford, NS; Scott Cook –St John's, NB; Brent Gilmour –Toronto, ON; Jonathon Ingram –Newport, UK; Charlie La Haye –St. Laurent, QC; Jason McRae –Kirkland, QC; Rodney Mulder –Windsor, ON; Martyn Wanamaker –Cannington, ON; Kerrick Flatt –Nanoose Bay, BC; Jean-Louis Fortin –Charlesbourg, QC; Joshua Johnson & Luke MacDonald –St. Stephen, NB; Keegan McLevin –Red Deer, AB; Aaron Meloche & Eric St. Pierre –Belle River, ON; Ashford Penner –North Battleford, SK; Krista Prevost –Whitehorse, YT	**Business**: **Alim Jiwa –North Vancouver, BC**‡; Carrie Donovan, Morgan Hicks, Mary Middleton, Michael Sponagle –Mount Uniacke, NS; Gregory Galanis –London, ON; Shane Hodak –Kelowna, BC; Matthew Macinnis & Andrew Macpherson –Port Hawkesbury, NS; Renee Poirier –Sydney River, NS; Travis Saunders –Fredericton, NB; Rebecca Sylvester –Kanata, ON; Ryan Townsend –Lindale, AB
**Dance**: **Colleen Rintamaki –Pickering, ON**‡; Stephanie Cadman & Nicolas Dromard –Nepean, ON & Ottawa, ON; Company C (10 members) –Mississauga, ON; Cody Green –South Surrey, BC; Joel Hanna –New Westminster, BC; Heidi Anne Harder –Surrey, BC; Jennifer Jimenez –Ottawa, ON; Galien Johnston –St. Albert, AB; Alexis Anne Maragozis –Victoria, BC; National Ballet School Ensemble (15 members) - Toronto, ON	**Environmental**: **Fiona Grant –Victoria, BC**‡; Jonathan Clark –Devon, AB; Earthdancers –Sudbury, ON; Kaitlyn Field –Sointula, BC; Amber General –St. Regis, QC; Highland Thunder (8 members) –Port Hawkesbury, NS; James Robins-Early –Vancouver, BC; Amy Taylor –South Crosby, ON
**Innovation/Science & Technology**: **Claire Heslop –Almonte, ON**‡; Adam Bly –Hampstead, QC; David Grant & James Grant –Trenton, ON; Jordan Harpur –Vancouver, BC; Kiyane Haykal –Nepean, ON; James Hlibka –Edmonton, AB; Andreanne Leboeuf & Monique MacLeod – Ste - Julie, QC & Chambly, QC; Cecilia Lui –Scarborough, ON; Robert Stephure –Calgary, AB; Raymund Yong –Calgary, AB	**Instrumental**: **John MacPhee –Summerside, PE**‡; Jean Catudal –Lasalle, QC; Chris Chown –London, ON; Philippe Doss –Montreal, QC; Ori Friedman –Thornhill, ON; Mathieu Gaulin –Montreal-Nord, QC; Boris Kupesic –Toronto, ON; Jessica Linnebach –Edmonton, AB; Patrice Servant –Buckingham, QC; April Dawn Verch –Pembroke, ON
**Public Service - UNICEF Award**: **Lisa Monkman –Winnipeg, MB**‡; Devani Atul –Grand Falls, Windsor, NF"; Iris Bonaise –Cut Knife, SK; Alaina Boyer –Kirkland, QC; Njeri Damali Campbell –Etobicoke, ON; Michael Cuccione –Coquitlam, BC; Jasan Dhanota –East York, ON; Angela Mills –Mt. Stewart, PE; Chau Pham –Winnipeg, MB; Mandy Pipher –Scarborough, ON	**Specialty Performance**: **Émile Carey –Montreal, QC**‡; Los Desperados (3 members) –Buckingham, QC; Emilie Dion and Catherine Viens (Caméléon) –Montreal, QC, & Rosemere, QC; Austin Garrick –Toronto, ON; Mathew Johnson –Stratford, ON; Mackenzie Loree –Nanton, AB; Samantha McKenna –Duncan, BC; Notre Dame Cheerleaders (18 members) –Welland, ON; Jeremy Rusu –Winnipeg, MB; Y B Normal? (4 members) –Aylmer, QC
**Sports**: **Emanuel Sandhu –Richmond Hill, ON**‡; Patrick Anderson –Fergus, ON"; Maxime Boilard –Lac Beauport, QC; Emilie Heymans –St. Lambert, QC; Jeane Lassen –Whitehorse, YT"; Bernard Luttmer –Pickering, ON; Yannick Lupien –Aylmer, QC; Dustin Ridson –Strathmore, AB"; Yvonne Tousek –Cambridge, ON; Tanya Wright –Beaumont, AB	**Terry Fox Award**: **Heather Muir –Walkerton, ON**‡; Megan Breitkreuz –Okanagan Falls, BC; Michael Cuccione –Coquitlam, BC; Bonnie Falls –Edmonton, AB; Joelle Fawcett –Edmonton, AB; Travis Gaertner –Winnipeg, MB; Kristin Hayes –Markham, ON; Nikki Parkinson –Mississauga, ON; Jocelyn Tomkinson –Victoria, BC
**Visual Arts**: **Oli Goldsmith –Toronto, ON**‡; Elena Bird –Nepean, ON; Alisha Boyd –Calgary, AB; Mélanie Couture –Tracy, QC; Claudine Leclerc –Pont-Rouge, QC; Ryan Lethbridge –King City, ON; Amaan Merali –Toronto, ON; Liem Nguyen –Winnipeg, MB; Meghan Telpner –Toronto, ON; Sarah Troper –Halifax, NS; Caili Woodyard –Ottawa, ON	**Vocal**: **Justin Hines –Stouffville, ON**‡; Tara Abbott –Oak Lake, MB; Kylee Epp –Qualicum Beach, BC; Annick Gagnon –Grand Falls, NB; Audrey Gagnon –Jonquiere, QC; Jenny Gear –Carbonear, NF; Rachel Frances Hamilton –Nepean, ON; Hugh Dawn Country (3 members) –Saskatoon, SK; Latoya Lesmond –Scarborough, ON; Dayna Manning –Stratford, ON; William Webb –Breckenridge, QC
**Writing**: **Warren Heiti –Sudbury, ON**‡; Brienna Altrogge –Dalmeny, SK; Nicolas Marc Billon –Montreal, QC; Mathieu Gallant –Moncton, NB; Marie-Eve Lacasse –Gatineau, QC; Anji Michalski –London, ON; Jennifer Miller –Saskatoon, SK; Kaelyn Morrison –Thunder Bay, ON; Amanda Olliver –St. Lazare, QC; Zachary-Evan Wychopen –Edmonton, AB	

=== 10th Annual YTV Achievement Awards (1999) ===
Winners are listed first, highlighted in boldface, and indicated with a double dagger (‡).

**Acting**: **Brendan Fletcher – Vancouver, BC**‡; Bill Switzer – Tsawassen, BC; Corey Sevier – Ajax, ON; Kimberley Warnat – Coquitlam, BC; Lawrence Arcouette – Montreal, QC; Martha MacIsaac – Cornwall, PE	**Band/Musical Group**: **Serial Joe – Thornhill, ON**‡; Jordan Cook and the Blues Boys – Saskatoon, SK; La Constellation – St-Romuaid, St-Nicolas, QC; The Ennis Sisters – St. John's, NF; Unonymus Inc. – Yellowknife, NT
**Bravery**: **Dustin Onerheim –Frontier, SK**‡; Aqib Rahman –Etobicoke, ON; Frank Thomas –Port Alberni, BC; Katie Coates –Westbury, QC; Tessa Logan –Winnipeg, MB	**Business**: **Hilary Rowland –Port Hope, ON**‡; Ben Barry –Ottawa, ON; Michael Furdyk –Etobicoke, ON; Perry Pugh –Fort McMurray, AB; Post Road Tea Room –Mount Uniacke, NS; Ryan Townsend –Lindale, AB
**Dance**: **David Cox –St. Catharines, ON**‡; Aisling Watt –Fort St. John, BC; Canadian National Tap Team –BC, AB, MB, ON; Cody Green –Surrey, BC; Heidi Harder –Surrey, BC; Stephanie Cadman –Nepean, ON	**Environmental**: **Lili Johnston Okuyama –Vancouver, BC**‡; Earthdancers –Sudbury, ON; Leslie Chambers, Keri McFarland –Vernon, BC; Maia Green –Victoria, BC; Morgan Anderson –Nelson, BC
**Innovation/Science & Technology**: **Jack and Mark Nowinski –Waterloo, ON**‡; Blaine Martin –Hanna, AB; Dilnaz and Dilnoor Panjwani –Etobicoke, ON; Perpetual –Calgary, AB; Tryke Industries Ltd. –North Vancouver, BC	**Instrumental**: **Berenika Zakrzewski –Sault Ste. Marie, ON**‡; Catherine Manoukian –Toronto, ON; Jean Catudal –LaSalle, QC; Patrice Servant –Buckingham, QC; Torley Wong –Vernon, BC; Wesley Chu –Calgary, AB
**Public Service - UNICEF Award**: **Jennifer Talson –New Westminster, BC**‡; Chantilly Iafrati –North Gower, ON; E.C.H.O. –Burlington, Ontario; Mathew and Jacob Brown –Carleton Place, ON; Tanya Roberts-Davis –Toronto, ON; The Little Red Dot Club –Toronto, ON	**Specialty Performance**: **A-Trak –Outremont, Quebec**‡; Apoorva Balakrishnan –Winnipeg, MB; Erika Lemay, Annick Laliberté –Quebec City, QC; Les Tourisk –Quebec City, QC; Mathew Johnson –Stratford, ON; Seth Rogen –Vancouver, BC
**Sports**: **Bernard Luttmer –Pickering, ON**‡; Erika-Leigh Stirton –Mississauga, ON; Kelly Stefanyshyn –Winnipeg, MB; Michael Ponikvar –St. Catharines, ON; Valerie Hould-Marchand –Quebec City, QC	**Terry Fox Award**: **Pamela Finnie –Golden, BC**‡; Amy Dohan –Beamsville, ON; Joelle Fawcette –Edmonton, AB; Joey Haché –Russell, ON; Michael Cuccione –Coquitlam, BC; Paul Cescon –Waterloo, ON
**Visual Arts**: **Riel Benn –Beulah, MB**‡; Chloe Li –Scarborough, ON; Elly Irvine –Wiarton, ON; Ilya Gefter –Thornhill, ON; Mélanie Couture –Tracy, QC; Oliver Millar –Ottawa, ON	**Vocal**: **Trevor Bowes –Victoria, BC**‡; Alison Smyth –Nepean, ON; Kortney Kayle –Ayr, ON; Manon Séguin –L'Orignal, ON; The Hudons –Saskatoon, SK; William Webb –Breckenridge, QC
**Writing**: **Aidan Johnson –Hamilton, ON**‡; Claire Laville –Toronto, ON; Jamey Hughton –Saskatoon, SK; Jenn Thompson –Victoria, BC; Marie-Eve Lacasse –Gatineau, QC	

=== 11th Annual YTV Achievement Awards (2000) ===
Winners are listed first, highlighted in boldface, and indicated with a double dagger (‡).

**Acting**: **Lawrence Arcouette – Montreal, Quebec**‡; Marc Donato – Woodbridge, Ontario; Jane McGregor – Vancouver, British Columbia; Joel Palmer – Vancouver, British Columbia; Kimberley Warnat – Coquitlam, British Columbia	**Band/Musical Group**: **Tegan and Sara – Calgary, Alberta**‡; Peters Drury Trio – Whitehorse, Yukon; Steel Toe Sandal – Toronto, Ontario; Sum 41 – Ajax, Ontario; Unonymous Inc. – Yellowknife, N.W.T.; Yesterday's Clash – North Delta, British Columbia
**Business**: **Michael Furdyk – Toronto, Ontario**‡; Lee Martin – Herschel, Saskatchewan; Perry Pugh – Fort McMurray, Alberta; Robert Sauchyn – Regina, Saskatchewan; Ryan Townsend – Lindale, Alberta	**Dance**: **Cody Green – Surrey, British Columbia**‡; Rebecca Blaney – Langley, British Columbia; Stephanie Cadman – Nepean, Ontario; Heidi Harder – Surrey, British Columbia; Arthur Kyeyune – Ottawa, Ontario; Aisling Watt – Fort St. John, British Columbia
**Innovation**: **Marc-André and Jean-Michel Filion – North Bay, Ontario**‡; Kyle Doerksen – Calgary, Alberta; Katalin and Peter Mayer – Calgary, Alberta; Michael Neufeld – elowna, British Columbia; Xing (Ziggy) Zeng – Montreal, Quebec	**Instrumental**: **Caitlin Tully – Vancouver, British Columbia**‡; Andrew Aarons – Toronto, Ontario; Shane Cook – Dorchester, Ontario; Ruston Vuori – Red Deer, Alberta; Jing Wang – Quebec City, Quebec; Irene Wong – Toronto, Ontario
**Public Service - UNICEF Award**: **Anna Millar – Edmonton, Alberta**‡; Ryan Hreljac – Kemptville, Ontario; The Little Red Dot Club – Toronto, Ontario; Lauryn Oates – West Vancouver, British Columbia; Tanya Roberts-Davis – Toronto, Ontario	**Specialty Performance**: **Jesse Van Rooi – Toronto, Ontario**‡; Apoorva Balakrishnan – Winnipeg, Manitoba; Stephanie Cadman – Nepean, Ontario; Mathew Johnson – Stratford, Ontario
**Sports**: **Geneviève Jeanson – Lachine, Quebec**‡; Emilie Heymans – Greenfield Park, Quebec; Valérie Hould-Marchand – Quebec, Quebec; Morgan Knabe – Calgary, Alberta; Emilie Livingston – Toronto, Ontario; Kelly Stefanyshyn – Winnipeg, Manitoba; Yvonne Tousek – Cambridge, Ontario	**Terry Fox Award**: **Quinn Page – Turner Valley, Alberta**‡; Michael Cuccione – Coquitlam, British Columbia; Alex Lytwyn – Winnipegosis, Manitoba; Melissa MacKay – Greenhill, Nova Scotia; Jodie Nimigon – Bowmanville, Ontario
**Visual Arts**: **Jonas Bell-Pasht – Toronto, Ontario**‡; Ilya Gefter – Thornhill, Ontario; Soren Johnstone – Rossland, British Columbia; Chloe Li – Scarborough, Ontario; Morgan Long – Kelowna, British Columbia	**Vocal**: **Adam Gregory – Edmonton, Alberta**‡; Jennifer Durand – Charlesbourg, Quebec; Kylee Epp – Qualicum Beach, British Columbia; Darrell Hicks – Scarborough, Ontario; Amanda Stott – Winnipeg, Manitoba
