= CMT (Canadian TV channel) =

Canadian specialty TV channel

- Country: Canada
- Broadcast area: Nationwide
- Headquarters: Toronto, Ontario

Programming
- Language: English
- Picture format: 1080i HDTV (downscaled to letterboxed 480i for the SDTV feed)

Ownership
- Owner: Corus Entertainment (90%, managing partner); Skydance Latin America and Carriban (10%)
- Sister channels: W Network; Showcase; Cartoon Network (Canada); Adult Swim (Canada); Boomerang (Canada)

History
- Launched: January 1, 1995; 31 years ago
- Former names: New Country Network (1995–1996); Country Music Television (1996–2006)

Links
- Website: cmt.ca

CMT is a Canadian English language discretionary specialty channel owned as a joint venture between Corus Entertainment (which owns a controlling 90% interest) and Paramount Networks Americas (which owns the remaining 10%), owners of the flagship CMT channel in the United States.

This channel was originally established on January 1, 1995 as the New Country Network under the joint ownership of Shaw Communications, who acquired Maclean-Hunter's stake in 1994, and Rawlco Communications. Later, NCN was relaunched on September 14, 1996 as CMT with CBS Cable acquiring the stake. Prior to its Canadian launch, the American version of CMT was available in Canada from 1984.

As with its U.S. counterpart, CMT previously devoted a large amount of its programming to country music, with such programming as music videos and concert specials. Over time, the channel shifted its focus towards family-oriented general entertainment such as sitcoms. With the end of CRTC-required genre exclusivity rules the year before, all music programming was phased out in August 2017.

== History ==
=== Launch and dispute ===
Prior to the launch of CMT Canada, the U.S.-based country television network, Country Music Television, had been available in Canada since 1984, one year after the channel's launch in the United States.

In June 1994, the Canadian Radio-television and Telecommunications Commission (CRTC) licensed a series of new Canadian specialty television channels; among the ones whose licence was granted was The Country Network, whose programming provisions required it to primarily feature country music videos (a minimum of 90%). The licence was granted to a partnership between Maclean-Hunter (which owned 60% majority control) and Rawlco Communications (which owned the remaining 40%).

At the time, the CRTC had a policy that if a Canadian specialty service was licensed and that service's format was competitive with a foreign service's format that was licensed to operate in Canada, the foreign service could be dropped from the list of channels eligible for cable carriage in Canada. Due to Country Music Television's competitive format, the CRTC terminated CMT's eligibility rights in Canada as a foreign service on June 6, 1994. Television distributors such as cable and satellite television operators could continue distributing Country Music Television until The Country Network began operations.

In March 1994, one year before the channel's launch, Maclean-Hunter had been purchased by Rogers Communications.

First and only New Country Network logo, used from 1995 to 1996

First CMT logo, used from 1996 to 2006

On January 1, 1995, the channel launched as New Country Network (NCN). On that date, Canadian pay television service providers were not allowed to offer Country Music Television. In retaliation for being barred from Canada, the U.S. service launched a complaint under the North American Free Trade Agreement and ceased carriage of videos by Canadian artists without major U.S. record deals.

Second CMT logo, used from 2006 to 2008

Third CMT logo, used from 2008 to 2010

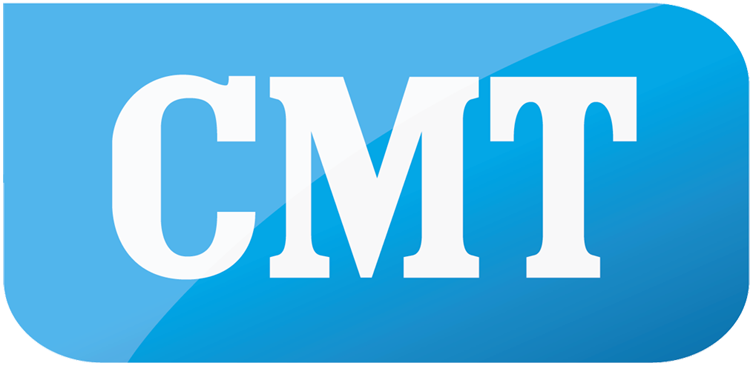
Fourth CMT logo, used from 2010 to 2015

After months of negotiations, the matter was settled when it was announced that CBS Cable, then owners of CMT, would purchase a minority stake in the service. NCN was relaunched as CMT on September 14, 1996. The majority interest was acquired by Shaw Communications at the same time; it was later included in the spinoff of the broadcasting assets then owned by Shaw as Corus Entertainment in 1999. The controversy also resulted in an effective change to CRTC policy – if a foreign channel is already available in Canada and a new Canadian equivalent is subsequently licensed, cable providers are no longer required to drop the foreign service.

=== Shift away from country music ===
In 2016, as part of the removal of the genre protection rules, CMT was migrated to the CRTC's new standard conditions of license for discretionary services; these changes removed the requirement for CMT to air any music programming at all. Corus stated in its description of service for CMT that it would be devoted to comedy and reality programming, films, and "one of a kind music programming". Despite the changes, Corus must still invest at least 11% of CMT's annual gross revenue to fund the production of Canadian music videos, without genre restrictions specific to only funding those produced by country artists.

These programming changes took effect on August 28, 2017, when CMT dropped all country music video programming from its schedule. The change in programming was widely criticized by stakeholders in Canada's country music industry, due to the loss of what had been a major promotional platform for Canadian performers; Corus stated that it would still promote Canadian country music through its other platforms (including its country music radio stations and some Global programming).

Canada wouldn't have another country music-related TV channel until rival broadcaster Stingray Group launched Stingray Country in 2019.

== Programming ==
As of November 2026, CMT's programming consists primarily of acquired sitcoms (with the exception of Due South), some of which are reruns of Canadian-produced series to fulfill Canadian content obligations. It no longer originates any original programming of its own, nor does it air any original programming emanating from the American CMT channel such as the CMT Music Awards (which remains available to most Canadian cable subscribers through CBS affiliates).

When CMT was launched as New Country Network on January 1, 1995, the CRTC required that 90% of the station's programming consist of music videos. The CRTC dropped that requirement to 70% on February 28, 2001, and reduced it even further to 50% on February 28, 2006. With the retirement of genre protection rules in 2016, CMT was no longer required to air music videos, leading to the channel dropping music programming altogether the following year in favor of comedy programming—drawn primarily from off-network reruns of sitcoms.

Under its country music format, CMT previously produced its own original Canadian programming, such as Karaoke Star Jr., Tori & Dean: Cabin Fever, and The Wilkinsons, with much of the channel's country music-related programming hosted by Paul McGuire.

== Former hosts/presenters ==
- Paul McGuire – host of Chevrolet Top 20 Countdown and CMT's Hottest (now at Stingray Radio)
- Casey Clarke (now at Stingray Radio)
- Cliff Dumas (now host of the Weekly Country Countdown)
- Shannon Gaye
- Gnarley Charley (was at KSKS in Fresno, California)
- Stu Jeffries (now at CHBM-FM in Toronto)
- Nicola Jones (was at CHCH in Hamilton, Ontario) - now deceased (October 2014)
- Ashley Kranz (winner of CMT Canada's "CMT Casting Call 2007" competition)
- Elissa Lansdell (was host of My Rona Home)
- Beverley Mahood (was at Breakfast Television Vancouver)
- Melissa Parrott (winner of CMT Canada's "CMT Casting Call 2009" competition)
- Hal Roberts (now News Director and Anchor with Bridge City News on CJIL-DT)
- Colleen Rusholme (now at CJOT-FM in Ottawa, Ontario)
- Greg Shannon (now at CFCW in Edmonton, Alberta)
- Nancy Sinclair
- Brian "Hurricane" Smith
- Tamara Stanners (was at CKPK-FM in Vancouver, British Columbia)
- Lindsay Stone

== See also ==
- CMT (American TV channel)
- Stingray Country
