= Goosebumps (disambiguation) =

Goose bumps are tiny bumps on the surface of the skin caused by involuntary muscle contractions at the base of each hair.

Goosebumps may refer to:

== Fiction ==
- Goosebumps, a series of children's horror novels by R. L. Stine
  - Goosebumps (original series)
  - Goosebumps (video game series)
  - Goosebumps (1995 TV series), a children's horror series, based on the books
  - Goosebumps (film), a horror movie, based on the books
  - Goosebumps (2023 TV series), an American horror comedy series

== Music ==
- "Goosebumps" (BA Robertson song), 1979
- "Goosebumps" (Travis Scott song), 2016
- Goosebumps (soundtrack), soundtrack of the same name of the 2015 film
- "Goosebumps", a song by Jerry Lee Lewis from Young Blood, 1995
- "Goosebumps", a song by Lemon Demon from Nature Tapes, 2014
- "Goosebumps", a song by Seeed from Next!, 2005
- "Goosebumps", a song by Meghan Trainor from Thank You, 2016
- "Goosebumps", a song by Zerobaseone from Never Say Never, 2025

== See also ==
- "Goosebumpz", a 2013 song by Mac Miller
