= Rona (store) =

Canadian home improvement retailer

Rona, Inc.
- Formerly: Les Marchands en Quincaillerie (1939–1960); Ro-Na (1960–1988); Rona Dismat (1988–1998)
- Type: Subsidiary
- Industry: Retail
- Founded: 1939; 87 years ago
- Founders: Roland Dansereau; Napoleon Piotte
- Headquarters: Boucherville, Quebec, Canada
- Number of locations: Around 425
- Area served: Canada; Saint Pierre and Miquelon, France (as Derrible)
- Key people: JP Towner (CEO)
- Products: Home improvement
- Revenue: CA$4.2 billion (2013)
- Operating income: ▼$332.9 million CAD (2009)
- Net income: ▲$43.2 million CAD (2010)
- Number of employees: approx. 52000 (2023)
- Parent: Sycamore Partners
- Subsidiaries: Rona+ (formerly Lowe's, Réno-Dépôt, and Rona Home & Garden); Rona Home Centre; Rona Cashway; Rona Lansing; Moffatt & Powell Rona; Rona Coast Builders; Rona Tyee Building Supplies L. P. Rona Powell River Building Supply Ltd. Mack Foster Building; G.A. Hardware Ltd. Derrible; Dick's Lumber
- Website: ronainc.ca

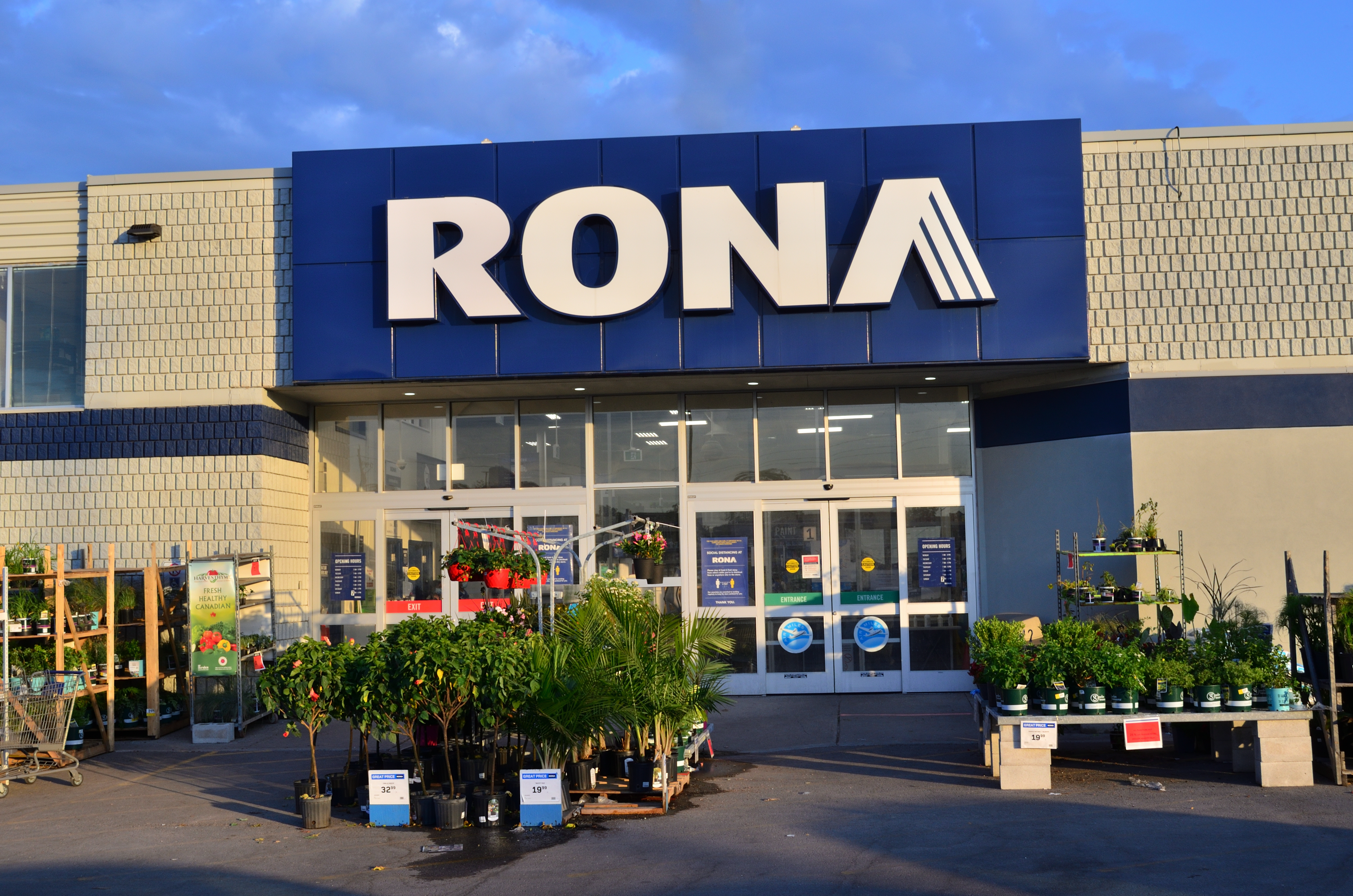
Rona in Markham, Ontario

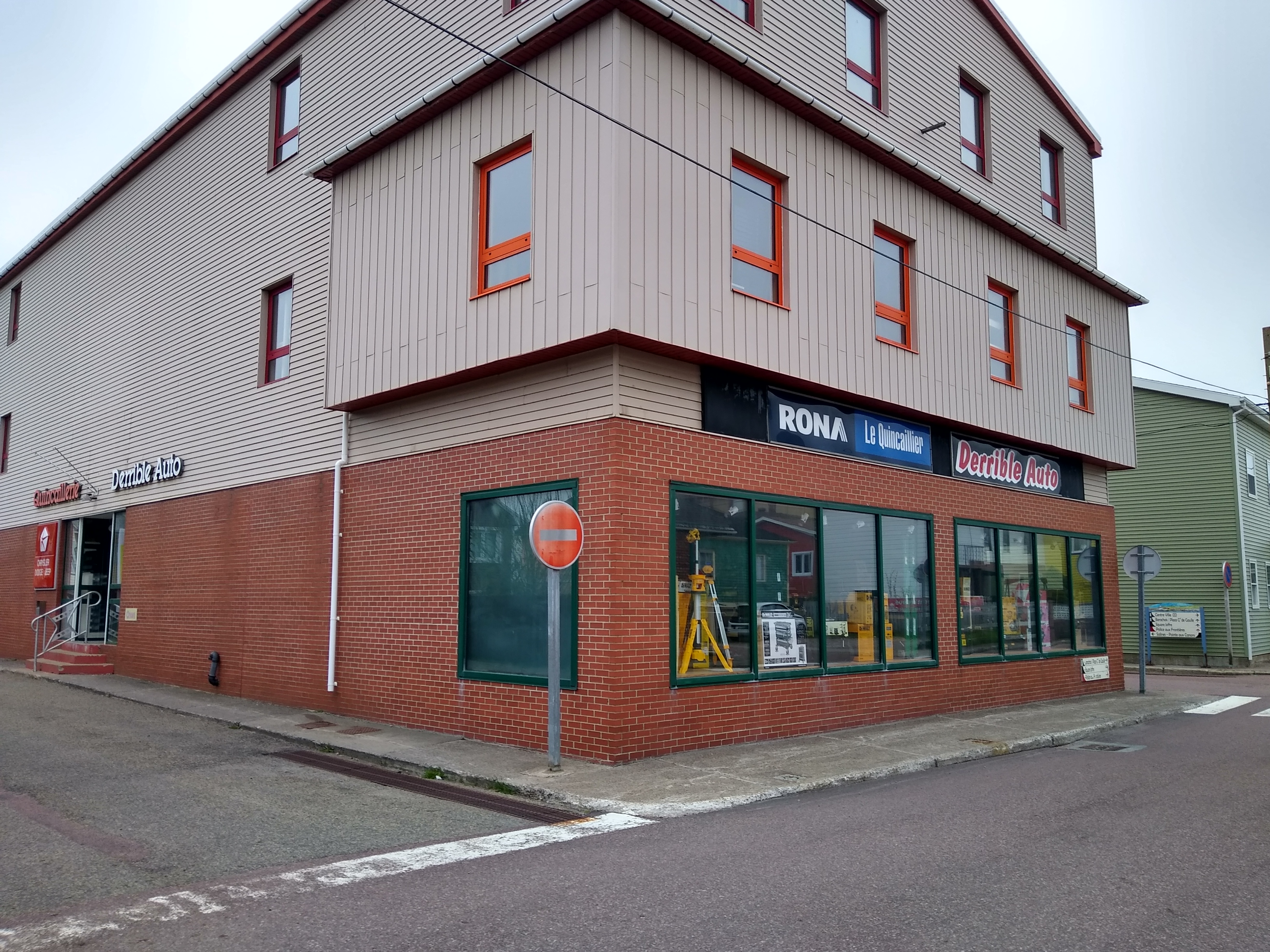
Rona in Saint-Pierre, France

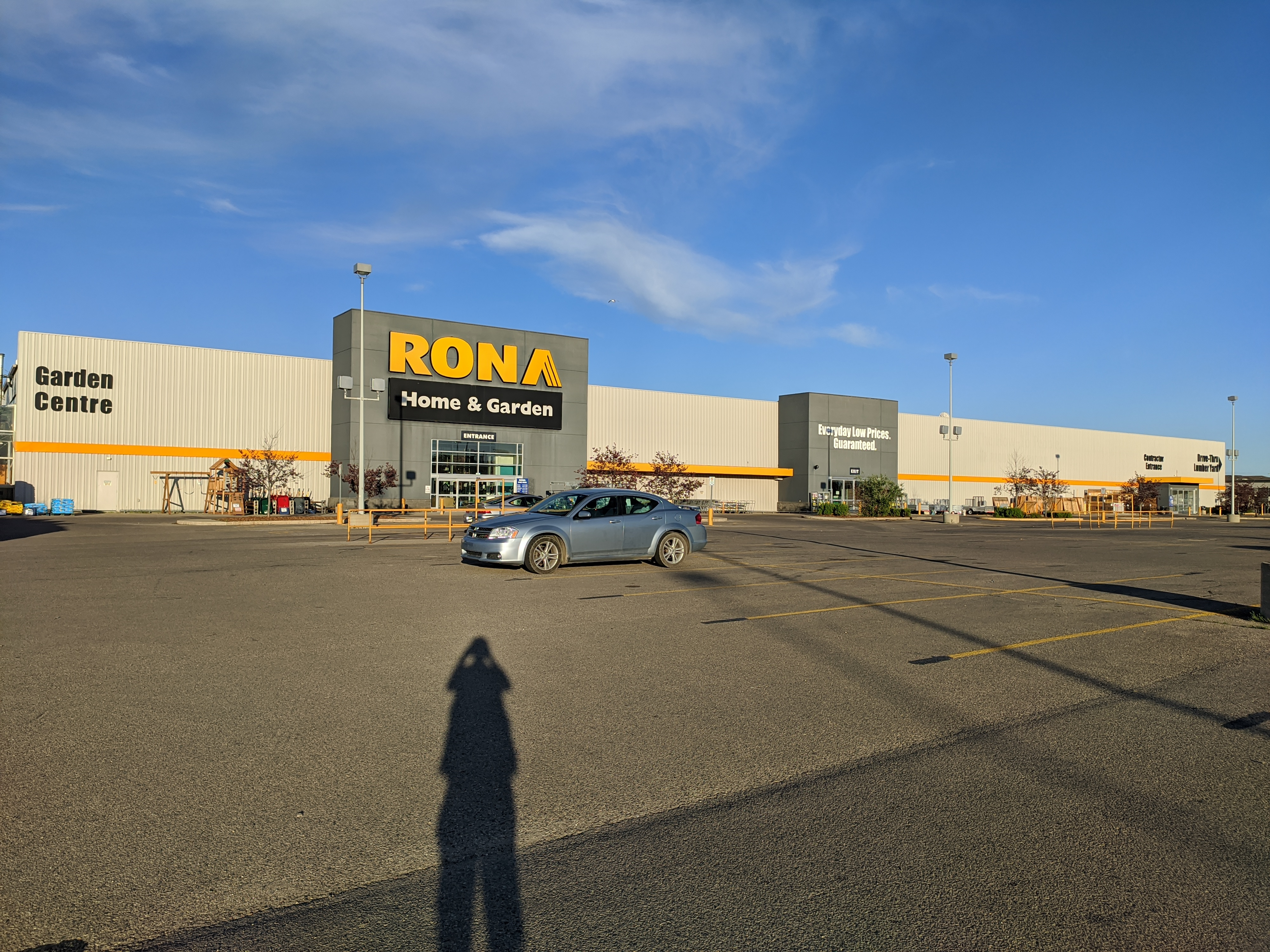
Rona Home & Garden in Regina, Saskatchewan

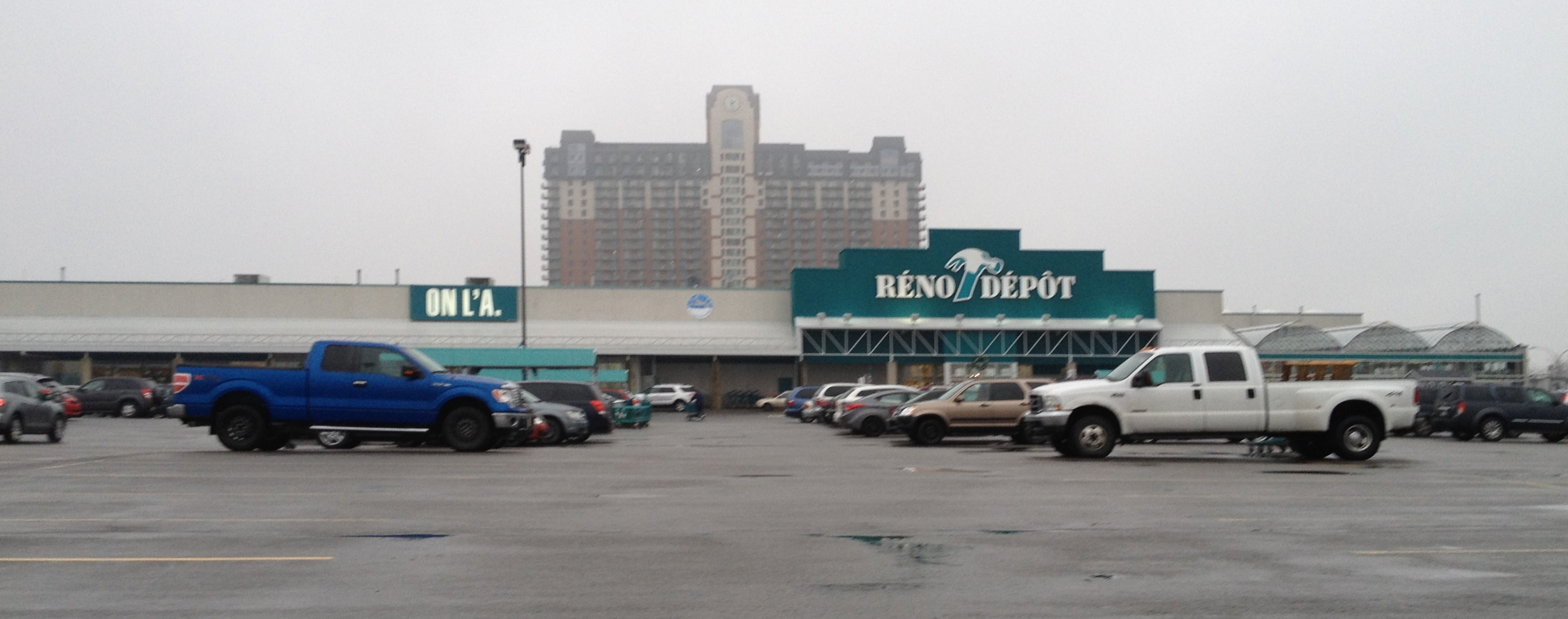
Réno-Dépôt in Laval, Québec

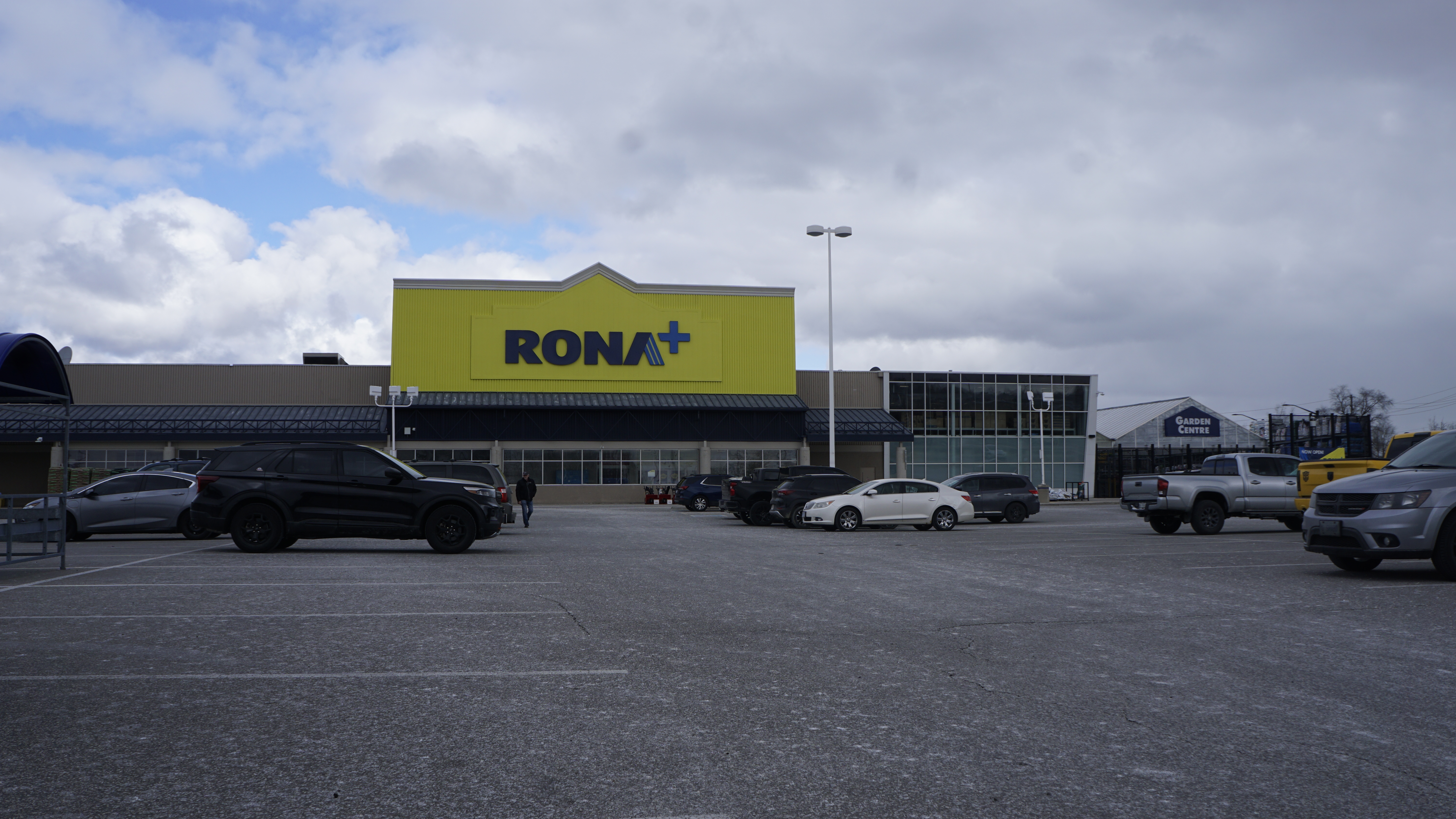
Rona+ in Windsor, Ontario

Rona Inc. (stylized as RONA) is a Canadian retailer of home improvement and construction products and services, owned by U.S.-based private equity firm Sycamore Partners. Founded in 1939, the company operates a mixture of company-owned and franchised retailers under multiple banners, including Rona, its big box formats Rona+, as well as smaller brands such as Rona Cashway, Moffatt & Powell and Dick's Lumber.

Lowe's acquired Rona for $3.2 billion CAD in May 2016. In November 2022, Lowe's announced it would sell its Canadian operations, including Rona, to Sycamore Partners; the deal was completed the following February. Rona announced in July 2023 that it would begin converting Lowe's locations to the new banner Rona+.

== History ==
In September 1939, Rona was founded as "Les Marchands en Quincaillerie" (The Merchants of Hardware), an alliance of independent Montreal-area hardware retailers who sought the buying power to bypass wholesalers and deal directly with manufacturers to get around a monopoly that threatened their ability to access supplies. Within two years they opened their first warehouse, and in 1946 held their first dealer show.

On July 20, 1960, the Ro-Na name was adopted, named after Roland Dansereau and Napoleon Piotte, co-founders of Les Marchands en Quincaillerie. Ro-Na member stores began adding the Ro-Na logo to identify themselves as members of the buying co-operative. M. Dansereau held controlling interest in the company until 1962, when M. Piotte and ten other dealers bought his shares and formed a true dealer co-operative, which they renamed Le Groupe Rona Inc.

In 1982, Rona purchased the assets of Botanix. In 1984, Rona created a purchasing alliance with Ontario-based Home Hardware Stores Ltd. through Alliance Rona Home Inc. In 1988, Rona merged with Dismat, another building materials company, to create Rona Dismat Group Inc. In 1990, Rona formed an alliance with Hardware Wholesalers, Inc. of Fort Wayne, Indiana. In 1992, Robert Dutton was appointed as President and CEO of Rona. In 1997, ITM Entreprises S.A., a France-based group, invested $30 million in the Rona Dismat Group Inc. ITM became a shareholder and created a purchasing alliance with Rona.

In 1998, Rona stopped using the Le Quincailleur and Dismat names and introduced Rona L'express, Rona L'express Matériaux and Rona Le Rénovateur Régional. Rona also changed its name from Rona Dismat Group Inc. to Rona Inc. In 1999, Rona opened a new warehouse adjacent to its headquarters, measuring 654,000 square feet (ca. 6 ha), doubling its warehousing capacity. In the year 2000, Rona acquired Ontario-based Cashway Building Centres, with 66 stores. In the same year, Rona opened its online store on the rona.ca website. In 2001, Rona acquired 51 Revy Home and Garden (based in British Columbia), Revelstoke Home Centres (located in Western Canada) and Lansing Building Supply (based in North York, Ontario since 1951 and merged with Revelstoke in 1998) stores, thus owning many more stores in the Greater Toronto Area.

In 2002, Rona closed a public offering consisting of a total offering of $150.1 million in common shares. Rona's common shares are traded on the Toronto Stock Exchange under the symbol "RON". In 2003, Rona acquired Réno-Dépôt Inc. from British Kingfisher plc, including The Building Box stores. Rona also opened its third large distribution centre in Calgary, Alberta. In 2004, Rona acquired Totem Building Supplies Limited, an Alberta company. Rona also joined the Air Miles Award Program the same year, allowing customers to gain Air Miles points while shopping at the store. Two TV shows sponsored by Rona, Rona Dream Home and Ma Maison Rona, were released in 2004.

In 2006, Rona acquired Stephens Home Centre/Castle Inc, a company based in Sydney, Nova Scotia. Rona also acquired a majority (51%) stake in Matériaux Coupal Inc. as well as Curtis Lumber Building Supplies and Chester Dawe Limited, a company based in St. John's, Newfoundland and Labrador. In 2007, Rona acquired Dick's Lumber, a company based in Burnaby, British Columbia. In 2007, Rona acquired Noble Trade, a company based in Concord, Ontario. In 2009, My Rona Home first aired. In 2010, Rona acquired Pierceys, a company based in Nova Scotia, Plomberie Payette & Perreault, a company based in Boucherville, Quebec, Moffatt & Powell, a company based in London, Ontario, Don Park Canada, and TruServ.

In 2012, the U.S. hardware store chain Lowe's attempted to buy Rona; however, the deal was met with objections from Rona shareholders (particularly the Caisse de dépôt et placement du Québec) and franchisees, and was eventually called off. On February 3, 2016, Rona announced that it had accepted an offer to be acquired by Lowe's for CDN$3.2 billion, pending regulatory and shareholder approval. Post-merger, Lowe's planned to maintain Rona's retail banners, and to "continue to employ the vast majority of its current employees and maintain key executives from Rona's strong leadership team". Lowe's Canada was operated from Rona's headquarters in Boucherville, but remained under the leadership of its CEO Sylvain Prud'homme. The purchase was closed in May 2016. In December 2016, Lowe's announced that it planned to convert selected Rona-branded stores to the Lowe's brand.

In 2019, acting upon a public complaint, Advertising Standards Canada ruled that Rona's continued display of signage such as "Truly Canadian" and "Proudly Canadian" on storefronts following the sale to the American-based Lowe's was misleading. Rona subsequently removed the signage.

In November 2022, Lowe's agreed to sell its Canadian operations (including the Lowe's-branded stores) to the American private equity firm Sycamore Partners, which also operates, among other properties, Staples Canada. Following the sale, Rona converted the Lowe's-branded stores to the Rona brand. The sale was completed on February 3, 2023. Rona announced in May 2024 that it would also convert Réno-Dépôt locations to the Rona+ banner.

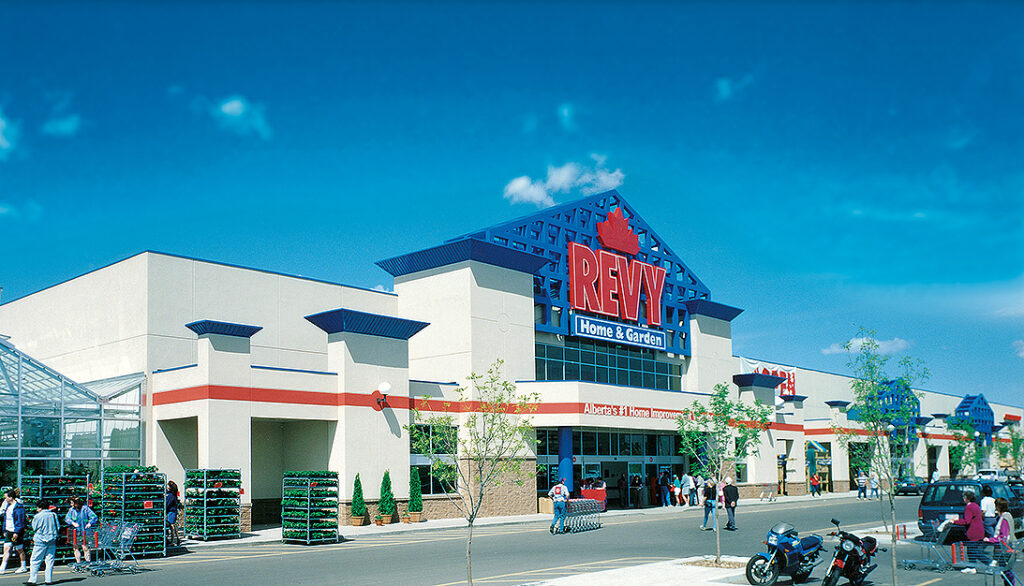
Former Revy Home & Garden in Alberta in 2001

== Retail operations ==
Rona is a participant in the voluntary Scanner Price Accuracy Code managed by the Retail Council of Canada.

=== Big box stores ===
In the 1990s, Rona established the Rona Home & Garden stores. Rona Home & Garden stores are large, ranging from 85,000 to 150,000 square feet (7,900 to 13,900 m^{2}), with a warehouse-style similar to The Home Depot and Lowe's. Faced with chronic under-performance in some markets outside of Quebec, Rona closed six big box stores in 2012, five in Ontario and one in British Columbia.

While stores of Home Depot and Lowe's as well as the defunct Réno-Dépôt chain have always been company owned, Rona Home & Garden locations were until 2015 a combination of corporately owned and franchised. As warehouse home improvement stores entered the market, Rona had brought together successful owners of small Rona affiliate stores in Quebec to invest in one or more big box format stores despite the massive investment required to build such outlets. Thus many Rona Home & Garden locations in that province had local ownership, a tradition of the family hardware store, and a great deal of flexibility to adapt to the market at the store level. Barring a few locations in Ontario, almost all of Rona's big-box format stores in the rest of Canada were entirely corporate-owned. In 2015, Rona acquired all remaining Rona Home & Garden franchise stores across the country to make the big box chain wholly owned by the company.

In December 2016, Lowe's Canada announced that 40 large-format Rona stores outside of Quebec would be rebranded under the Lowe's name, as part of an effort to re-position the Rona brand for mid-size stores.

In July 2023, following the sale of Rona to Sycamore Partners, Rona announced that it would introduce a new store banner known as Rona+ to encompass the former Lowe's locations. The conversion began with 10 locations in Ontario on July 27, 2023 and was completed in March 2024 with the Lowe's stores in Western Canada. Rona also began to convert non-Lowe's stores to the branding as well, including the 16 remaining Réno-Dépôt stores, and Rona Home & Garden locations in Quebec and Winnipeg.

== TV shows ==
=== Rona Dream Home ===
Rona Dream Home is a Canadian reality television series based on the New Zealand series Mitre 10 Dream Home, which debuted in 2004 on Global and was hosted by Caroline Redekopp.

The shows follow two families who have ten weeks to turn a house into a dream home. The winner, chosen by viewers, is awarded the home they built. The show lasted for two seasons, with the first season airing March to May 2004 and the second season from April to June 2005. Season 1 had ten episodes whilst season 2 had nine.

=== Ma Maison Rona ===
Ma Maison Rona is a French-Canadian reality television series based on the New Zealand series Mitre 10 Dream Home, which debuted in 2004 on French language channel TVA. The show was the French counterpart to Rona Dream Home.

The show has two families compete to build the best house for $100,000 over the course of 10 weeks. Each week, the family complete one room and impress the viewers of the show, who have the final vote. Each team is assigned a contractor, designer, and foreman, with input from family members allowed. The winning family keeps the house they made plus an additional $400,000 while the losing family wins a $25,000 down payment on a home.

The show was produced by Zone 3 and lasted until 2009, with a total of 7 seasons.

=== My Rona Home ===
My Rona Home is a Canadian reality television series, which debuted in October 2009 on Citytv.

Hosted by Elissa Lansdell and sponsored by Rona and The Brick furniture chain, the series pits two Alberta families against each other in a competition to design and build a dream home. At the end of the ten-week contest, the winning family is awarded the home they built. The series was based on the previous TV shows Rona Dream Home and Ma maison RONA.

Season 2 of the show first aired in April 2011. Season 2 was the last season.
