= Lowe's Canada =

Canadian home improvement retail chain

Lowe's Canada, Inc.
- Type: Subsidiary
- Founded: December 10, 2007; 18 years ago in Hamilton, Ontario, Canada
- Defunct: February 29, 2024; 2 years ago
- Fate: Converted into Rona+, some stores closed (mainly former RONA Home & Garden locations)
- Successor: Rona+
- Headquarters: Etobicoke, Toronto, Ontario, Canada
- Number of locations: More than 470 with subsidiaries
- Areas served: Canada
- Key people: Marvin R. Ellison (CEO)
- Products: Home appliances, tools, hardware, builders hardware, lumber, building materials, paint, plumbing, flooring, garden supplies, plants, housewares, furniture, home decor, bedding, and curtains
- Revenue: ▲CA$22445 (2023 02/03)
- Operating income: ▲CA$1669 (2023 02/03)
- Net income: ▲CA$955.9 (2023 02/03)
- Total assets: ▲CA$43708 (2023 02/03)
- Total equity: ▼CA$-14254 (2023 02/03)
- Number of employees: 26,000 employees
- Website: lowes.ca

Lowe's Canada, Inc. was the Canadian subsidiary of American home improvement chain Lowe's.

The Lowe's chain began an expansion into Canada in 2007, beginning with locations in Ontario, and later expanding into other provinces. In 2016, the company acquired its Canadian rival Rona Inc. for CDN$3.2 billion, assuming control of its store banners and relocating its operations to Rona's headquarters in Boucherville, Quebec. Some of Rona's locations were converted to the Lowe's banner.

In November 2022, Lowe's announced that it would sell its Canadian operations to Sycamore Partners for $400 million. Following the completion of the sale in 2023, Sycamore began to phase out the Lowe's brand in Canada, replacing it with the new Rona banner Rona+.

== History ==
The first store outside the United States was in Hamilton, Ontario, Canada. According to its website, Lowe's has operated more than 2,355 locations in the United States, Canada, and Mexico alone, although the Mexican stores were closed in the late 2010s.

Lowe's opened its first three stores in Canada on December 10, 2007, in Hamilton, Brampton, and Brantford. On February 1, 2008, they opened three more stores in Toronto and East Gwillimbury, and a second store in Brampton as well as a new location in Maple (Vaughan). Lowe's also expanded into western Canada, starting with three new stores in Calgary, Alberta. One of the three locations opened in late September 2010. The other two opened by early 2011. In 2018 Lowe's had 62 locations in Canada, with stores in British Columbia, Manitoba, and Saskatchewan. Each store represented an average investment of $20.5 million (US$20.4 million).

In 2012, Lowe's attempted to buy Rona Inc., a Quebec-based hardware chain. However, the deal was met with objections from Rona shareholders (particularly the Caisse de dépôt et placement du Québec) and operators of its franchised locations over concerns that the company could centralize its supply operations in the United States, and was eventually called off.

In February 2013, Lowe's Canada hired former Walmart Canada and Loblaw Companies executive Sylvain Prud'homme as CEO.

On May 11, 2015, Lowe's Canada announced that it would acquire the leases of 13 former Target Canada stores, as well as an Ontario distribution centre, for $151 million.

On February 3, 2016, Rona announced that it had accepted an offer to be acquired by Lowe's for CDN$3.2 billion, pending regulatory and shareholder approval. The division would remain under the leadership of Sylvain Prud'homme but would be operated out of Rona's headquarters in Boucherville. Lowe's maintained Rona's retail banners, "key" executives, and the "vast majority of its current employees" post-acquisition. 40 Rona Home & Garden locations in large markets were to be converted to the Lowe's banner.

In November 2022, Lowe's agreed to sell its Canadian operations to the private equity firm Sycamore Partners for $400 million, including the Lowe's locations and Rona's banners. It was stated that the Lowe's brand would be discontinued and replaced with Rona. The sale was completed on February 3, 2023. On July 27, 2023, Rona began transitioning Lowe's Canada locations to the new store banner Rona+.

== Associated brands ==
- Kobalt tools
- EGO
- allen+roth
