= Paul McGuire (television host) =

Canadian broadcaster

Paul McGuire (born in Edinburgh, Scotland) is a radio and television presenter based in Canada.

He has primarily worked with Canadian television networks, beginning with YTV. He most prominently served as a presenter for country music channel CMT—where he hosted the Chevrolet Top 20 Countdown among other programs. At the 2016 CMA Awards, McGuire won a special recognition award for International Broadcaster of the Year. In 2017, he joined a multi-channel network run by Canadian music publisher Ole to produce and host music-related content on YouTube.

McGuire currently works for Stingray Radio, hosting The Paul McGuire Show—a midday show which is syndicated across Stingray's country stations. In 2022, he began co-hosting afternoons on Stingray's CFXJ-FM in Toronto. In September 2024, he began hosting mornings with that station's flip to country.
