= McVie =

McVie is a surname. Notable people with the surname include:

- Brad McVie, a character in the movie Four Christmases
- Christine McVie (1943–2022), English musician
- Gordon McVie (1945–2021), British medical doctor
- John McVie (born 1945), English rock bass guitarist
- Sarah McVie (born 1978), Canadian actress
- Tom McVie (1935–2025), Canadian ice hockey coach
- Willie McVie (born 1948), Scottish footballer

== See also ==
- McVee, surname
