= List of Murdoch Mysteries episodes =

Murdoch Mysteries is a Canadian mystery drama television series that began in 2008. The series is based on the Detective Murdoch novels by Maureen Jennings and is set in Toronto around the turn of the 20th century. It centres on William Murdoch (Yannick Bisson), a detective at Station House Four, who solves crimes using scientific techniques and inventions which are highly advanced for the time (e.g. fingerprinting). He is assisted by Constable George Crabtree (Jonny Harris), city coroner Doctor Julia Ogden (Hélène Joy) and Inspector Thomas Brackenreid (Thomas Craig). The show was developed for television by R.B. Carney, Cal Coons and Alexandra Zarowny. It is produced by Shaftesbury Films.

The series was preceded by three television movies, which aired on Bravo! from 2004 to 2005. These featured a different cast: Peter Outerbridge as Detective Murdoch, Keeley Hawes as Doctor Ogden, Matthew MacFadzean as Constable Crabtree and Colm Meaney as Inspector Brackenreid.

Murdoch Mysteries aired on Citytv for five seasons before being cancelled. It was then picked up by CBC, where it has aired since season six. The show airs in the UK on Alibi and is co-produced by Alibi's parent company, UKTV. It airs both Ovation and Acorn TV in the US starting January 2022. The first twelve sasons aired on Ovation under the title The Artful Detective.

== Series overview ==
Season	Episodes	Originally released		
Season	Episodes	First released	Last released	Network
TV films	3	May 13, 2004	September 8, 2005	Bravo
1	13	January 20, 2008	April 13, 2008	Citytv
2	13	February 10, 2009	May 27, 2009	Citytv
3	13	March 14, 2010	June 13, 2010	Citytv
4	13	June 7, 2011	August 31, 2011	Citytv
5	13	June 6, 2012	August 28, 2012	Citytv
6	13	January 7, 2013	April 15, 2013	CBC
7	18	September 30, 2013	April 7, 2014	CBC
8	18	October 6, 2014	March 30, 2015	CBC
9	19	October 5, 2015	March 21, 2016	CBC
10	19	October 10, 2016	March 20, 2017	CBC
11	19	September 25, 2017	March 19, 2018	CBC
12	18	September 24, 2018	March 4, 2019	CBC
13	18	September 16, 2019	March 2, 2020	CBC
14	11	January 4, 2021	March 15, 2021	CBC
15	24	September 13, 2021	April 11, 2022	CBC
16	24	September 12, 2022	April 10, 2023	CBC
17	24	October 2, 2023	April 8, 2024	CBC
18	22	September 30, 2024	April 14, 2025	CBC
19	21	October 6, 2025	April 13, 2026	CBC
20	TBA	October 5, 2026	TBA	CBC

== Episodes ==
=== Television films (2004–2005) ===
No.	Title	Directed by	Written by	Original release date
1	Except the Dying	Michael DeCarlo	Janet MacLean	May 13, 2004
Detective Murdoch discovers that a naked woman found murdered in a back alley known for prostitution was actually a housemaid of a prominent family. When Dr. Ogden informs him that the girl was pregnant and had been drugged, Detective Murdoch is ever more convinced that the girl's death was not an accident.
2	Poor Tom Is Cold	Michael DeCarlo	Story by : Cal Coons and Jean Grieg; Teleplay by : Cal Coons, Jean Grieg and Janet MacLean	September 12, 2004
When Detective Murdoch's friend and protege, Constable Oliver Wicken, is found shot to death in the basement of an abandoned house, the constabulary rule it as suicide. Murdoch is determined to prove it was murder and clear Wicken's name.
3	Under the Dragon's Tail	John L'Ecuyer	Janet MacLean	September 8, 2005
The case of a murdered midwife grows more complex when it is discovered that she also performed abortions.

=== Season 1 (2008) ===
In July 2007, Shaftesbury Films began filming a 13-episode series based on both Maureen Jennings' novels and the Murdoch Mysteries TV movies, which would air on Bravo! in 2008. However, subsequent changes in Canadian media ownership resulted in Bravo! being owned by CTVglobemedia, whereas Murdoch Mysteries was acquired by Rogers Communications, who decided to air it on their recently acquired CityTV network.

Filming of the first season of Murdoch Mysteries took place between June 11 and October 17, 2007, primarily in Toronto and Hamilton, Ontario.

Recurring cast members include Tamara Hope as Edna Garrison, Dmitry Chepovetsky as Nikola Tesla, Lachlan Murdoch as Constable Henry Higgins, Arwen Humphreys as Margaret Brackenreid, Allan Royal as Chief Constable Stockton, Geraint Wyn Davies as Arthur Conan Doyle, Maria del Mar as Sarah Pensell, Stephen McHattie as Harry Murdoch, and Peter Keleghan as Terrence Meyers.

No. overall	No. in season	Title	Directed by	Written by	Original release date
1	1	"Power"	Farhad Mann	R.B. Carney	January 20, 2008
Murdoch enlists the help of Nikola Tesla while investigating the inexplicable murder of the newly crowned Miss Toronto Electric and Light, who is electrocuted by an insulated switch at a public demonstration on the dangers of alternating current. Crabtree becomes romantically involved with one of the suspects, Edna Garrison.
2	2	"The Glass Ceiling"	Shawn Thompson	Jean Greig and Cal Coons	January 27, 2008
A murderer taunts Brackenreid by sending him the bodies of a lawyer and a judge, along with a note claiming he will be next. Murdoch's impressive detection skills are noticed by Chief Constable Stockton, who subsequently interviews him for the position of Inspector at another police station.
3	3	"The Knockdown"	Shawn Thompson	Alexandra Zarowny	February 3, 2008
When African American boxer Amos Robinson is shot after a fight, all the evidence points to his wife, who was found standing over his body holding the murder weapon. However, Murdoch believes her to be innocent, and sets out to find the real killer amid mounting racial tensions.
4	4	"Elementary, My Dear Murdoch"	Don McBrearty	Jason Sherman	February 10, 2008
A skeptical Murdoch accompanies Arthur Conan Doyle to a seance. When the medium, Sarah Pensell, channels a murder victim and reveals the location of her body, Murdoch must come up with a rational explanation. Murdoch's skepticism is further shaken when Pensell reveals private information to him about his deceased fiancée, Liza.
5	5	"Till Death Do Us Part"	Don McBrearty	Janet MacLean	February 17, 2008
A man is murdered in a church shortly before his wedding. When it is revealed that the marriage was a sham to claim an inheritance and that the victim was homosexual, Murdoch finds himself wrestling with his faith and the notion that homosexuality is a sin.
6	6	"Let Loose the Dogs"	Don McBrearty	Jean Greig and Cal Coons	February 24, 2008
When a man is murdered shortly after engaging in a drunken brawl over the results of a ratting match, suspicion immediately falls upon the man he was fighting – Murdoch's estranged father.
7	7	"Body Double"	Shawn Thompson	R.B. Carney	March 2, 2008
The decomposing body of the Grand Theatre's former owner falls onto the stage during a performance of Macbeth. When exhumation of his supposed grave reveals yet another body, Murdoch suspects the troupe of actors know more than they are letting on.
8	8	"Still Waters"	Don McBrearty	Derek Schreyer	March 9, 2008
When a member of the King's Rowing Club's Olympics team is murdered, suspicion quickly falls upon his predecessor, who was removed from the team when the victim joined. However, Murdoch suspects someone may be attempting to frame him, and must uncover the truth amid the other rowers' lies and misdirections.
9	9	"Belly Speaker"	Farhad Mann	Larry Lalonde and Philip Bedard	March 16, 2008
Arthur Conan Doyle returns to Toronto to shadow Murdoch, hoping to find inspiration for a new detective novel. Murdoch reluctantly agrees and turns his attention to the brutal murder of a man whose ventriloquist son has confessed via his abusive dummy.
10	10	"Child's Play"	Shawn Thompson	Alexandra Zarowny	March 23, 2008
A well-liked philanthropist is murdered, and it appears that a group of Home Children from an institution which the victim supported may be to blame.
11	11	"Bad Medicine"	John L'Ecuyer	Derek Schreyer	March 31, 2008
A hooded figure goes on a killing spree at a cutting edge brain research facility. As Murdoch investigates, he is contacted by medium Sarah Pensell, who tells him that she has foreseen the murderer's final victim – Murdoch himself.
12	12	"The Prince and the Rebel"	John L'Ecuyer	Alexandra Zarowny	April 6, 2008
Crabtree is assigned the difficult task of protecting Queen Victoria's playboy grandson, Prince Alfred, who is visiting Toronto. Meanwhile, Murdoch and Higgins investigate the murder of a woman who appears to be connected to the Irish Republican Brotherhood, who may be plotting to assassinate the Prince.
13	13	"The Annoying Red Planet"	Shawn Thompson	Paul Aitken	April 13, 2008
Murdoch must solve the baffling death of a man whose body is found hanging from a tree in the centre of a recently plowed field with no footprints in the surrounding soil. The discovery of nearby crop circles convinces Crabtree that Martian spaceships are to blame, but the discovery of a recent land ownership dispute involving the victim leads Murdoch to suspect more terrestrial suspects. The investigation brings Murdoch head-to-head with a ruthless Canadian Government agent, Terrence Meyers.

=== Season 2 (2009) ===
Filming for season two took place in Toronto, Cambridge and St. George. Additional filming took place in Drumheller and near Vancouver, where the set of the 1989 series Bordertown was used.

Recurring cast members include Lachlan Murdoch as Henry Higgins, Arwen Humphreys as Margaret Brackenreid, Paul Amos as Doctor Roberts, Sarah Gadon as Ruby Ogden, Michael Seater as James Gillies, Peter Keleghan as Terrence Meyers, Sarah Allen as Enid Jones, Dakota Goyo as Alwyn Jones, and Stephen McHattie as Harry Murdoch.

No. overall	No. in season	Title	Directed by	Written by	Original release date
14	1	"Mild Mild West"	Paul Fox	Derek Schreyer	February 10, 2009
A performer is killed during a bullet catch trick at Buffalo Bill's Wild West show. Although the man's death appears to be a freak accident, Murdoch suspects he may have been murdered and uncovers a dark secret in his past which would provide ample motive. Brackenreid's wife joins the Temperance League and chastises him for his heavy drinking.
15	2	"Snakes and Ladders"	Farhad Mann	Cal Coons	February 10, 2009
When a serial killer begins mutilating and disemboweling women, a tenacious Scotland Yard detective who believes that the killer may be Jack the Ripper inserts himself into Murdoch's investigation. Murdoch calls upon the expertise of an alienist, Doctor Roberts, to help profile the murderer.
16	3	"Dinosaur Fever"	Paul Fox	Jean Greig	February 17, 2009
Murdoch's investigation takes him inside the cutthroat world of 19th century paleontology when the grand unveiling of a dinosaur skeleton reveals a corpse in the creature's mouth.
17	4	"Houdini Whodunit"	Farhad Mann	Alexandra Zarowny	February 24, 2009
Murdoch must solve a seemingly impossible robbery when a thief burgles a sealed bank vault without opening the door. A witness claims to have seen Harry Houdini fleeing the scene of the crime. Meanwhile, Julia's younger sister, Ruby, visits Toronto.
18	5	"The Green Muse"	Don McBrearty	Bobby Theodore	March 3, 2009
The garroted corpse of a prostitute is discovered after a high-class brothel is firebombed. Murdoch must tread carefully when he discovers that a prominent judge may be to blame. The Temperance League puts pressure on Brackenreid to stamp out prostitution in Toronto. Murdoch and Ogden finally give in to their mutual attraction and begin a romantic relationship.
19	6	"Shades of Grey"	Don McBrearty	Laura Phillips	March 10, 2009
A young woman's body is found in a creek, and Murdoch's investigation reveals she died of poisoning following an attempted abortion. The case hits close to home for Dr. Ogden, who reveals to Murdoch that she had an illegal abortion some years previously, putting a strain on their relationship.
20	7	"Big Murderer on Campus"	Laurie Lynd	Carol Hay	March 17, 2009
Murdoch attempts to unravel what appears to be the perfect murder when a gunman shoots a college professor from a crowded plaza, yet is seen by no one. Two eager students, James Gillies and Robert Perry, shadow Murdoch during the investigation. Crabtree reveals himself to be a foundling and attempts to locate his biological mother.
21	8	"I, Murdoch"	Laurie Lynd	Lori Spring	March 24, 2009
Murdoch investigates the bizarre murder of a mathematics professor. Meanwhile, a young boy's report of a giant silver knight roaming the woods attracts the attention of Terrence Meyers and the Canadian Government, who believe it may be a weaponized automaton. Murdoch begins courting the boy's mother, Enid Jones.
22	9	"Convalescence"	Eleanore Lindo	Paul Aitken	March 31, 2009
Murdoch is seriously injured while chasing a murder suspect. While recovering, he is confined to his bedsit, but strange noises and increasingly fevered visions lead him to suspect his landlady may be up to something. Crabtree becomes acting detective in Murdoch's absence and takes over the murder case, only to discover that the sole witness is a parrot.
23	10	"Murdoch.com"	Eleanore Lindo	Alexandra Zarowny	April 7, 2009
Murdoch learns that Toronto's female telegraphers are falling prey to a predatory conman when one of his marks is murdered. Murdoch's relationship with Enid is strained when he jeopardizes her safety in order to catch the killer. Brackenreid's usage of a cocaine-based gold cure for alcoholism causes him to become increasingly belligerent, further straining his marriage and his relationship with his co-workers.
24	11	"Let Us Ask the Maiden"	Harvey Crossland	Jason Sherman	April 14, 2009
A young Jewish man who was involved in a love triangle is poisoned. While it initially appears that a jealous suitor is to blame, Murdoch's discovery that the victim's friend is trying to form a union leads him to suspect more sinister motives. Murdoch and Enid's relationship continues to flounder.
25	12	"Werewolves"	Kelly Makin	Paul Aitken	April 21, 2009
Several men who had been on a hunting trip together are stalked and brutally murdered by a creature that appears to be a werewolf. Murdoch and Enid's relationship comes to an end when they both realize he is still in love with Julia.
26	13	"Anything You Can Do..."	Kelly Makin	Laura Phillips	April 28, 2009
Murdoch finds a rival in the form of RCMP officer Jasper Linney when they both begin investigating the same murder. The case leads them to British Columbia, where they encounter Murdoch's father. Murdoch rekindles his relationship with Julia.

=== Season 3 (2010) ===
Murdoch Mysteries was renewed for a third season by CityTV in June 2009. As part of the show's production deal, all episodes premiered in the UK on the Alibi network before premiering in Canada; this arrangement continued until the end of season five.

The first episode of season three was partially filmed in Bristol, England. Additional filming took place around Ontario, at Ball's Falls and the Glanmore National Historic Site.

Recurring cast members include Lachlan Murdoch as Henry Higgins, Lisa Faulkner as Anna Fulford, Allan Royal as Chief Constable Stockton, Richard Clarkin as Inspector Davis, Arwen Humphreys as Margaret Brackenreid, Paul Amos as Doctor Roberts, Peter Stebbings as James Pendrick, Kate Greenhouse as Sally Pendrick, Sarah Gadon as Ruby Ogden, Dmitry Chepovetsky as Nikola Tesla, and Peter Keleghan as Terrence Meyers.

No. overall	No. in season	Title	Directed by	Written by	Original release date
27	1	"The Murdoch Identity"	Laurie Lynd	Jean Greig	February 16, 2010
Murdoch finds himself in Bristol, England, with no memory of who he is or how he got there. Worse still, he is being ruthlessly hunted by armed men who claim he is a killer. He is harboured by publican Anna Fulford, and the two work to piece together his identity. Back in Toronto, Station House Four and Doctor Ogden are searching desperately to find the missing detective.
28	2	"The Great Wall"	Harvey Crossland	Alexandra Zarowny	February 23, 2010
A constable from Station House Five is murdered in Toronto's Chinatown district and his fellow officers start violently harassing the local Chinese population in a racially-fuelled revenge campaign. Murdoch is tasked with finding the killer, but quickly finds himself at odds with the station house and their Inspector.
29	3	"Victor, Victorian"	Laurie Lynd	Alexandra Zarowny	March 2, 2010
Secrets abound when a prospective Mason is murdered at their induction and the autopsy reveals that the victim was in fact a woman who had been living her life as a man.
30	4	"Rich Boy, Poor Boy"	Harvey Crossland	Carol Hay	March 9, 2010
Inspector Brackenreid's son is kidnapped in a case of mistaken identity.
31	5	"Me, Myself and Murdoch"	Don McCutcheon	Paul Aitken	March 16, 2010
The prime suspect in the murder of a man is his daughter, who claims the devil made her do it.
32	6	"This One Goes to Eleven"	Cal Coons	Carol Hay	March 23, 2010
Murdoch investigates a perplexing case when an original Rembrandt painting vanishes into thin air while under heavy guard inside a moving elevator.
33	7	"Blood and Circuses"	Sudz Sutherland	Paul Aitken and Alexandra Zarowny	March 30, 2010
Murdoch investigates the death of a tiger tamer found half eaten by the animal.
34	8	"Future Imperfect"	Cal Coons	Cal Coons	April 6, 2010
Murdoch once again butts heads with James Pendrick when a member of Pendrick's eugenics society is murdered. Meanwhile, Crabtree investigates the disappearance of several dogs, much to Brackenreid's disapproval.
35	9	"Love and Human Remains"	David Sutherland	Lori Spring	April 13, 2010
Murdoch investigates a murder that seemingly occurred over 60 years ago.
36	10	"The Curse of Beaton Manor"	John L'Ecuyer	Paul Aitken	April 20, 2010
Murdoch investigates the death of a man whose servants claim was killed by the ghost of his brother.
37	11	"Hangman"	Don McCutcheon	Philip Bedard and Larry Lalonde	April 27, 2010
Murdoch investigates when a convicted murderer survives his hanging and escapes from the morgue.
38	12	"In the Altogether"	Steve Wright	Jean Grieg	May 4, 2010
Murdoch has no shortage of suspects when a young woman who had been blackmailing wealthy men is murdered.
39	13	"The Tesla Effect"	Steve Wright	Cal Coons	May 11, 2010
When a former research associate of Nikola Tesla is murdered with a fearsome new weapon that harnesses thermal radiation, all evidence points towards the recently imprisoned James Pendrick.

=== Season 4 (2011) ===
Guest appearances in season four included Victor Garber, Lisa Faulkner, Simon Williams, Peter Keleghan, Craig Olejnik, and Lisa Ray. On October 15, 2010, then Canadian Prime Minister Stephen Harper and his daughter visited the set of Murdoch Mysteries. As part of the visit to the set Stephen Harper filmed a cameo appearance.

No. overall	No. in season	Title	Directed by	Written by	Original release date	Canadian viewers
40	1	"All Tattered and Torn"	Don McCutcheon	Phil Bedard and Larry Lalonde	February 15, 2011	546,000
Murdoch butts heads with Dr. Ogden's replacement, Dr. Francis (Paul Rhys), while investigating the case of a body part found encased in a block of concrete along the Don River.
41	2	"Kommando"	Harvey Crossland	Graham Clegg	February 22, 2011	454,000
The investigation into the brutal death of a soldier at Fort York is met with great opposition from the military.
42	3	"Buffalo Shuffle"	Yannick Bisson	Phil Bedard and Larry Lalonde	March 1, 2011	474,000
Murdoch heads to Buffalo at the request of Dr. Ogden to help her investigate the suspicious death of a patient, whom she has been forbidden from autopsying. Meanwhile, Constable Crabtree is tasked with solving the case of a break-in at the station house.
43	4	"Downstairs, Upstairs"	Harvey Crossland	Story by : Paul Aitken; Teleplay by : Lori Spring	March 8, 2011	497,000
Family secrets are unraveled when Murdoch investigates a murder that a witness claims was carried out by a dead woman.
44	5	"Monsieur Murdoch"	John L'Ecuyer	Paul Aitken and Graham Clegg	March 15, 2011	520,000
Murdoch teams up with a French detective while investigating the disappearance of a young woman from her hotel room.
45	6	"Dead End Street"	Laurie Lynd	Carol Hay	March 22, 2011	434,000
Detective Murdoch is captivated by a miniature streetscape that seemingly depicts a crime scene. However, the artist is an autistic woman who doesn't speak.
46	7	"Confederate Treasure"	John L'Ecuyer	Paul Aitken	March 29, 2011	700,000
A routine investigation comes to the attention of Prime Minister Wilfrid Laurier as a matter of national security involving potential fallout from Canadian involvement in the American Civil War.
47	8	"Dial M for Murdoch"	Leslie Hope	Carol Hay	April 5, 2011	428,000
When a switchboard operator hears an apparent murder over the telephone, Murdoch's improvised telephone wire-tapping technology uncovers an elaborately constructed criminal enterprise and a psychotic killer who will stop at nothing to preserve it.
48	9	"The Black Hand"	Don McCutcheon	Cal Coons	April 12, 2011	555,000
Murdoch is reunited with old flame Anna Fulford while investigating a shooting on a crowded streetcar that nobody heard. Meanwhile, Inspector Brackenreid faces pressure from his backers in his run for Alderman to score political points by harassing a band of Gypsies.
49	10	"Voices"	Gail Harvey	Jean Greig	April 19, 2011	649,000
Murdoch is reunited with his long-lost sister while investigating the murder of a priest at a convent.
50	11	"Bloodlust"	Gail Harvey	Story by : Paul Aitken and Graham Clegg; Teleplay by : Paul Aitken, Graham Clegg, Phil Bedard and Larry Lalonde	April 26, 2011	541,000
Detective Murdoch finds himself in the midst of the vampire craze created by the recent publication of Bram Stoker's Dracula when a young schoolgirl is found dead, drowned and drained of blood.
51	12	"The Kissing Bandit"	Cal Coons	Alexandra Zarowny	May 3, 2011	452,000
A series of brazen daylight bank robberies by an amorous, dashing masked man, who steals from the banks to give to the poor, sends Detective Murdoch on an unpopular chase. Meanwhile, Ruby surprises Dr. Ogden by arriving in town to assist with – and then take over – Julia's wedding planning.
52	13	"Murdoch in Wonderland"	Cal Coons	Paul Aitken and Graham Clegg	May 10, 2011	446,000
A man is found murdered at a Lewis Carroll costume party and all evidence points to Detective Murdoch.

=== Season 5 (2012) ===
No. overall	No. in season	Title	Directed by	Written by	Original release date	Canadian viewers
53	1	"Murdoch of the Klondike"	Laurie Lynd	Peter Mitchell	February 28, 2012	385,000
Murdoch has left Toronto, and police work, for the Yukon. However, while in pursuit of fortune in the Klondike Gold Rush, he is drawn into a murder investigation (with the help of Jack London), and realizes his days as a detective are not yet behind him.
54	2	"Back and to the Left"	Don McCutcheon	Paul Aitken and Graham Clegg	March 6, 2012	319,000
Religious tensions threaten to boil over when a Protestant Alderman is murdered during the Orange parade, and all evidence points to an Irish Catholic.
55	3	"Evil Eye of Egypt"	Don McCutcheon	Michelle Ricci	March 13, 2012	352,000
When the archaeologists behind an exhibition of recently excavated Egyptian antiquities begin dying under bizarre circumstances, rumours arise that a curse may be to blame.
56	4	"War on Terror"	Laurie Lynd	Peter Mitchell	March 20, 2012	370,000
While investigating an explosion, Detective Murdoch infiltrates an anarchist group led by American labour organizer, Emma Goldman.
57	5	"Murdoch at the Opera"	Yannick Bisson	Carol Hay	March 27, 2012	410,000
Murdoch investigates the poisoning of a young opera singer, and soon suspects she was not the intended victim.
58	6	"Who Killed the Electric Carriage?"	Harvey Crossland	Paul Aitken and Graham Clegg	April 3, 2012	368,000
James Pendrick returns to Toronto seeking investors for his latest invention – an electric car. When one of Pendrick's associates is murdered, Murdoch once again suspects the inventor may be a killer.
59	7	"Stroll on the Wild Side, Part One"	Michael DeCarlo	Daphne Ballon	April 10, 2012	N/A
Detective Murdoch's investigation into the disappearance of a quiet librarian leads to a reunion with former love, Anna Fulford, and the discovery of a steamy underworld.
60	8	"Stroll on the Wild Side, Part Two"	Michael DeCarlo	Carol Hay	April 17, 2012	N/A
During his investigation into the murder of a shy librarian with a secret life, Murdoch encounters another young woman behaving seductively.
61	9	"Invention Convention"	Cal Coons	Paul Aitken	April 24, 2012	N/A
When a widely-disliked inventor is killed by a complex mechanical machine at a convention, Murdoch enlists Alexander Graham Bell's help to discover the killer's identity.
62	10	"Staircase to Heaven"	Harvey Crossland	Maureen Jennings and Peter Mitchell	May 1, 2012	N/A
A high stakes card game involving Doctor Grace ends with the death of a player. Murdoch learns the winner of the game would be afforded the opportunity to die and be revived, in an attempt to contact the other side.
63	11	"Murdoch in Toyland"	Cal Coons	Graham Clegg	May 8, 2012	N/A
Murdoch is taunted by a deranged kidnapper who leaves talking dolls with personal messages directed at him at each crime scene. Guest appearance: John Tench as Alexander Graham Bell
64	12	"Murdoch Night in Canada"	Gail Harvey	Lori Spring	May 15, 2012	N/A
Murdoch investigates when the captain of the Toronto Wellingtons hockey team is found dead in the locker room, shortly after fighting with another player.
65	13	"Twentieth Century Murdoch"	Gail Harvey	Paul Aitken, Carol Hay, Peter Mitchell and Michelle Ricci	May 22, 2012	N/A
As the twentieth century approaches, Murdoch investigates the claims of a man who says that time travelling to the future provided him with information that allowed him to stop crimes.

=== Season 6 (2013) ===
Scenes from "The Ghost of Queen's Park" were filmed on location on July 13, 2012. David Onley, the current Lieutenant Governor of Ontario, had a cameo in season six in which he portrayed the eighth lieutenant governor of Ontario, Oliver Mowat. Thomas Howes made a guest appearance as Winston Churchill, who asked Murdoch's help when he was accused of murder.

Georgina Reilly (Dr. Emily Grace) was promoted to series regular for the sixth season.

No. overall	No. in season	Title	Directed by	Written by	Original release date	Can. viewers (millions)
66	1	"Murdoch Air"	Don McCutcheon	Peter Mitchell	January 7, 2013	1.18
Murdoch is drawn into an arms race between the Canadian and American governments while investigating the crash of a prototype aircraft.
67	2	"Winston's Lost Night"	Don McCutcheon	Paul Aitken	January 14, 2013	0.97
After hours of heavy drinking, Winston Churchill awakes at the scene of a murder with no memory of the previous night. Murdoch must piece together what happened to prove Churchill's innocence.
68	3	"Murdoch on the Corner"	Cal Coons	Paul Aitken	January 21, 2013	0.96
Murdoch suspects a serial killer is at work when a string of seemingly random people are murdered inside their own homes. The only apparent connection between the victims is a street corner that they all visited shortly before dying.
69	4	"A Study in Sherlock"	Don McCutcheon	Graham Clegg	January 28, 2013	1.15
After an armed robber is murdered by his accomplice during a heist, Murdoch's prime suspect is an incredibly perceptive man who claims to be Sherlock Holmes. Geraint Wyn Davies makes a brief return appearance as Arthur Conan Doyle.
70	5	"Murdoch Au Naturel"	Harvey Crossland	Michelle Ricci	February 4, 2013	1.05
Murdoch investigates a murder at a nudist community.
71	6	"Murdoch and the Cloud of Doom"	Yannick Bisson	Derek Schreyer	February 11, 2013	1.17
When an anonymous madman threatens the citizens of Toronto with a deadly toxic gas, Murdoch must race against the clock to stop him.
72	7	"The Ghost of Queen's Park"	Harvey Crossland	Lori Spring	February 25, 2013	0.90
Crabtree's theories of the paranormal conflict with Murdoch's scientific beliefs while investigating the death of a politician who was seemingly killed by a vengeful ghost.
73	8	"Murdoch in Ladies Wear"	Cal Coons	Carol Hay	March 4, 2013	1.06
Murdoch investigates the murder of an Eaton's department store manager who was disliked by the shop girls.
74	9	"Victoria Cross"	Peter Mitchell	Maureen Jennings and Peter Mitchell	March 11, 2013	1.07
An uncooperative witness impedes Murdoch's investigation into a pawnbroker's murder and Brackenreid faces resistance while looking into the death of an old army friend.
75	10	"Twisted Sisters"	Eleanore Lindo	Michelle Ricci	March 18, 2013	1.22
A series of violent drownings of university-educated unmarried career women leads Murdoch to suspect sexist and racist motives.
76	11	"Lovers in a Murderous Time"	Dawn Wilkinson	Carol Hay	March 25, 2013	0.99
Detective Murdoch and Dr. Ogden find themselves at odds when a delusional woman (Sheila McCarthy) becomes the prime suspect in the violent stabbing of her gambling fiancé.
77	12	"Crime & Punishment"	Laurie Lynd	Peter Mitchell	April 8, 2013	1.00
Detective Murdoch and his methods are compromised when Dr. Ogden is implicated in the suspicious murder of her estranged husband.
78	13	"The Murdoch Trap"	Laurie Lynd	Paul Aitken	April 15, 2013	1.10
With Dr. Ogden sentenced to hang for murder, Detective Murdoch races to exonerate her and steps into a trap set by the real killer.

=== Season 7 (2013–2014) ===
The seventh season premiered on September 30, 2013.

No. overall	No. in season	Title	Directed by	Written by	Original release date	Can. viewers (millions)
79	1	"Murdoch Ahoy"	Laurie Lynd	Paul Aitken	September 30, 2013	1.39
A shipping magnate's daughter disappears without a trace on a ship's inaugural Victoria Day voyage.
80	2	"Tour de Murdoch"	Laurie Lynd	Jordan Christianson	October 7, 2013	1.25
A competitive racer dies in the middle of a bicycle race, leading Murdoch to believe he was killed by a mysterious stimulant.
81	3	"The Filmed Adventures of Detective William Murdoch"	Gail Harvey	Peter Mitchell	October 14, 2013	1.00
Murdoch becomes involved in the movie making world while investigating a murder involving James Pendrick and Thomas Edison as suspects.
82	4	"The Return of Sherlock" "Return of Sherlock Holmes" (Note: Sources differ as to the title of this episode. The Return of Sherlock is used by CBC on television schedules and its official webpage for the episode. Return of Sherlock Holmes was used in press releases, home media releases, and on the CBC video player.)	Gail Harvey	Carol Hay	October 21, 2013	1.08
Murdoch re-encounters David Kingsley/Sherlock Holmes, who is investigating the murder of his young client's godfather and the disappearance of his nanny.
83	5	"Murdoch of the Living Dead"	Yannick Bisson	Michelle Ricci	October 28, 2013	1.17
Murdoch investigates a woman's supposed death by drowning, with the primary suspect being her abusive husband who had recently become docile.
84	6	"Murdochophobia"	Cal Coons	Maureen Jennings and Peter Mitchell	November 4, 2013	N/A
Murdoch investigates the apparent suicide of one of Julia's patients.
85	7	"Loch Ness Murdoch"	Cal Coons	Michelle Ricci	November 18, 2013	1.39
The body of a young woman is discovered washed up on a beach with what appear to be large bite marks on her body.
86	8	"Republic of Murdoch"	Don McCutcheon	Paul Aitken and Peter Mitchell	November 25, 2013	1.40
A murder leads Murdoch and Crabtree chasing a potential suspect to Newfoundland, where they are caught between a family feud for a treasure map.
87	9	"Midnight Train to Kingston"	Don McCutcheon	Paul Aitken and Peter Mitchell	December 2, 2013	1.41
Murdoch and his colleagues escort James Gillies to his execution in Kingston via train.
88	10	"Murdoch in Ragtime"	Harvey Crossland	Carol Hay	January 6, 2014	1.43
The founder of a black singing group is found dead by the docks.
89	11	"Journey to the Centre of Toronto"	Harvey Crossland	Simon McNabb	January 13, 2014	1.32
A series of diamond thefts in which the thief tunneled up from the earth leads Crabtree to believe in the existence of mole people.
90	12	"Unfinished Business"	Dawn Wilkinson	Peter Mohan	January 20, 2014	1.35
A dying man confesses to a murder that Murdoch discovers the man could not have committed.
91	13	"The Murdoch Sting"	Sudz Sutherland	Jackie May	January 27, 2014	1.48
A bank president goes missing just before his engagement party, leading Murdoch to a run-in with a familiar face. Meanwhile, Julia receives information that James Gillies is alive and sets out to find him.
92	14	"Friday the 13th, 1901"	Michael DeCarlo	Lori Spring	March 3, 2014	1.38
Crabtree faces off against Leslie Garland in a game of curling. Meanwhile, Julia and Emily attend a bachelorette party on what may be a haunted island.
93	15	"The Spy Who Came Up to the Cold"	Sudz Sutherland	Adam Barken	March 10, 2014	1.33
Murdoch must deal with spies and secret plans in Toronto when U.S. President William McKinley is assassinated in Buffalo, New York.
94	16	"Kung Fu Crabtree"	Michael McGowan	Paul Aitken	March 24, 2014	1.38
Crabtree teams up with a suspect accused of poisoning a visiting Chinese dignitary in order to find the real killer while Murdoch and Julia receive proof that James Gillies is dead.
95	17	"Blast of Silence"	Peter Mitchell	Peter Mitchell	March 31, 2014	1.34
After a determined opponent of industrial progress straps a bomb onto a factory owner, Murdoch must stop the bomber from destroying all of Toronto.
96	18	"The Death of Dr. Ogden"	Michael McGowan	Jordan Christianson, Carol Hay, Simon McNabb and Michelle Ricci	April 7, 2014	1.35
Julia learns the truth about her father when he unexpectedly dies and Brackenreid assumes responsibility of an investigation into the murder of a mathematical genius.

=== Season 8 (2014–2015) ===
No. overall	No. in season	Title	Directed by	Written by	Original release date	Can. viewers (millions)
97	1	"On the Waterfront, Part One"	Laurie Lynd	Peter Mitchell	October 6, 2014	0.94 (Note: Overnight rating.)
Inspector Slorach fills in for a recovering Brackenreid as Murdoch investigates two cases related to the harbour. Meanwhile, Julia and Emily are arrested during a suffragette protest.
98	2	"On the Waterfront, Part Two"	Laurie Lynd	Peter Mitchell	October 13, 2014	1.03
In a continuation of the previous episode, the violence on the waterfront continues while Brackenreid's attackers remain at large. Emily and Julia end up in court following their arrest.
99	3	"Glory Days"	Yannick Bisson	Jordan Christianson and Peter Mitchell	October 20, 2014	0.91
Murdoch teams up with Bat Masterson to hunt down Butch Cassidy and the Sundance Kid. Meanwhile, Julia struggles with Murdoch's desire to marry in the church, which conflicts with her own values.
100	4	"Holy Matrimony, Murdoch!"	Sudz Sutherland	Paul Aitken	November 3, 2014	1.36
As their wedding day approaches, Murdoch and Ogden intervene in the trial of a woman accused of killing her husband.
101	5	"Murdoch Takes Manhattan"	Sudz Sutherland	Simon McNabb	November 10, 2014	1.01
Murdoch and Doctor Ogden honeymoon in Manhattan, but trouble always follows. Meanwhile, Inspector Brackenreid and Dr. Grace deal with the murder of an automobile owner.
102	6	"The Murdoch Appreciation Society"	Deborah Chow	Carol Hay	November 17, 2014	N/A
Murdoch must determine fact from fiction when a group of dedicated fans stage a murder to watch Murdoch work, which deters the detective from an actual murder case.
103	7	"What Lies Buried"	Deborah Chow	Paul Aitken	November 24, 2014	N/A
The remains of a constable from 1881 are discovered in the station house basement, leading Murdoch to investigate whether any of his colleagues was responsible.
104	8	"High Voltage"	Cal Coons	Carol Hay	December 1, 2014	1.32
A businessman is found electrocuted, apparently by his own invention, and all clues point to Thomas Edison's son, Edison Jr.
105	9	"The Keystone Constables"	Cal Coons	Jordan Christianson	December 8, 2014	1.31
Constables Crabtree and Higgins go undercover as a vaudeville act at a local theatre after a comedian is found murdered.
106	10	"Murdoch and the Temple of Death"	Harvey Crossland	Paul Aitken	January 12, 2015	1.39
Murdoch investigates the death of a man found in a river, and soon finds himself searching for the infamous Holy Grail in a booby trapped temple.
107	11	"All That Glitters"	Harvey Crossland	Lori Spring	January 19, 2015	1.45
A murder of a land surveyor leads Murdoch and Crabtree to Northern Ontario during the silver rush. Back in Toronto, Dr. Ogden sees potential in Brackenreid's painting skills. Brock Morgan as Tom Thomson.
108	12	"The Devil Wears Whalebone"	Eleanore Lindo	Michelle Ricci	January 26, 2015	1.46
Murdoch investigates the murder of a model who was killed during a protest at a corset show. The past history of suffragette Lillian Moss is revealed during the process of the investigation as she and Dr. Grace grow close.
109	13	"The Incurables"	Eleanore Lindo	Peter Mitchell	February 9, 2015	N/A
Murdoch and Ogden investigate a strange murder at the asylum involving a group of violent women, one of whom vows revenge on Dr. Ogden.
110	14	"Toronto's Girl Problem"	Peter Mitchell	Michelle Ricci	February 16, 2015	1.37
Inspector Brackenreid's nephew, Charlie, joins the constabulary as he and Murdoch investigate the murder of the leader of an all-female thieves gang.
111	15	"Shipwreck"	Don McBrearty	Maureen Jennings	February 23, 2015	1.44
The murder of a young woman praying at her parents' grave and the subsequent disappearance of the priest she had last contact with reunites Murdoch with the priest who raised him in childhood.
112	16	"Crabtree Mania"	Peter Mitchell	Simon McNabb and Jordan Christianson	March 16, 2015	1.26
Crabtree investigates the death of a professional wrestler while Brackenreid invests his savings with his barber, only to discover that he has closed his business and disappeared with the funds. Meanwhile, The Temperance League attempts to woo the suffragettes by offering support for their candidate in return for adding their policies to their platform.
113	17	"Election Day"	Don McBrearty	Michelle Ricci and Mary Pedersen	March 23, 2015	1.34
Murdoch investigates a murder that, according to Agent Terrence Meyers, involves national security. Meanwhile, Julia and Emily try to ensure the election, in which Margaret Haile stands, is conducted fairly with the assistance of the other suffragettes, a young Agnes Macphail taking notice of their efforts. Crabtree proposes to Edna Brooks, only to be greeted by her husband who was presumed to be deceased.
114	18	"Artful Detective"	Don McCutcheon	Paul Aitken and Carol Hay	March 30, 2015	1.41
The constabulary investigates what they believe is a "sequential killer" that Murdoch discovers is a macabre form of gambling. Crabtree is preoccupied with the physical abuse sustained by Edna Brooks at the hands of her recently returned husband.

=== Season 9 (2015–2016) ===
Season 9 saw guest appearances of William Shatner as author Mark Twain, Lucy Maud Montgomery, Prime Minister Wilfrid Laurier and Mouna Traoré as Rebecca James, a young protegee whom Julia takes under her wing.

No. overall	No. in season	Title	Directed by	Written by	Original release date	Can. viewers (millions)
115	1	"Nolo Contendere"	TW Peacocke	Peter Mitchell and Paul Aitken	October 5, 2015	1.27
Murdoch investigates the stabbing of an inmate at the institution where Crabtree is serving time for the murder of Edna Brooks' husband and it becomes apparent that the two cases are connected.
116	2	"Marked Twain"	TW Peacocke	Peter Mitchell	October 12, 2015	N/A
Murdoch and his colleagues must protect the safety of author Mark Twain after he stirs up controversy during a speaking engagement in Toronto.
117	3	"Double Life"	Gary Harvey	Jordan Christianson	October 26, 2015	1.19
Suffragette Lillian Moss is murdered days before she and Dr. Grace are to leave for London.
118	4	"Barenaked Ladies"	Laurie Lynd	Carol Hay	November 2, 2015	1.35
A murdered prostitute is discovered concealed within a life-sized nude statue.
119	5	"24 Hours Til Doomsday"	Gary Harvey	Paul Aitken	November 9, 2015	1.30
Racing against the clock, Murdoch must stop a secret weapons programme that appears to have been hijacked by terrorists.
120	6	"The Local Option"	Laurie Lynd	Simon McNabb	November 16, 2015	1.27
The temperance movement advocates The Local Option, a bill to restrict liquor sales, as Station House Four investigates the poisoning of a Councilman who advocated for the liquor trade. Carrie Nation is invited to Toronto to support the proposal and she stays at the home of Inspector Brackenreid, where his wife, Margaret, enacts a local prohibition for the duration of her stay.
121	7	"Summer of '75"	Don McBrearty	Michelle Ricci and Carol Hay	November 23, 2015	1.40
Winifred "Freddie" Pink, a private investigator from Montreal and Murdoch's childhood friend, assists Murdoch in investigating a case that has ties with a 30-year-old murder they witnessed, and which leaves them in fear of their lives.
122	8	"Pipe Dreamzzz"	Don McBrearty	Michelle Ricci	November 30, 2015	1.24
A love triangle is uncovered when a student of Asian studies is found dead in the opium den of his professor.
S01	–	"A Merry Murdoch Christmas" (Note: This is a two-hour Christmas special)	Michael McGowan	Peter Mitchell	December 21, 2015	1.97
A wealthy philanthropist who opens his home to some of Toronto's elite for a production of The Little Match Girl, featuring a young Mary Pickford in the title role, is found murdered, leaving Murdoch to investigate. Meanwwhile, Brackenreid deals with a man claiming to be the real St. Nicholas.
123	9	"Raised on Robbery"	Eleanore Lindo	Paul Aitken	January 11, 2016	1.48
While applying for a loan to build his automated dream home for Dr. Ogden, Murdoch finds himself in the midst of a bank heist that puts his reputation at risk. Inspector Brackenreid uses the police department's telegraph machine to convey the live play of a match that involves Sheffield Wednesday.
124	10	"The Big Chill"	Eleanore Lindo	Jordan Christianson	January 18, 2016	1.49
Captain Joseph-Elzéar Bernier is in Toronto attempting to raise funds for an expedition to the North Pole when he is anonymously accused of the murder of the scientist who served as a navigator and physician on all of his previous expeditions.
125	11	"A Case of the Yips"	Cal Coons	Simon McNabb	January 28, 2016	1.41
When a golfer is murdered, Murdoch investigates by taking up the game with George Lyon, despite warnings from Brackenreid that golf is a curse.
126	12	"Unlucky in Love"	Cal Coons	Lori Spring	February 1, 2016	1.50
An elderly groom is electrocuted at a wedding planned by Margaret Brackenreid while Crabtree meets Lucy Maud Montgomery while teaching a creative writing class.
127	13	"Colour Blinded"	Leslie Hope	Mary Pedersen	February 8, 2016	1.49
After a white man is killed in a black church, the new Chief Constable pressures Murdoch to make an arrest.
128	14	"Wild Child"	Jill Carter	Carol Hay	February 22, 2016	1.42
Murdoch leads Station House No. 4 during a murder investigation linked to a young girl who was raised in the wild. When it is discovered that the Braxtons were not Roland's biological parents, Dr. Ogden hires Freddie Pink to locate their adopted child's real parents.
129	15	"House of Industry"	Harvey Crossland	Maureen Jennings	February 29, 2016	1.50
A journalist is murdered while investigating a story at a city workhouse. Murdoch goes undercover and discovers that the Chief Constable may be implicated in corruption at Station House No. 5. Crabtree, Higgins and Rebecca James are swindled when they attempt to sample a banana split.
130	16	"Bloody Hell"	Harvey Crossland	Paul Aitken	March 7, 2016	1.36
Murdoch and Brackenreid attempt to expose corruption at Station House No. 5 when Brackenreid is caught with the proceeds of the pay-off money by the Chief Constable. To save himself from prison time, Brackenreid accepts a demotion to city clerk. The members of Station House No. 4 continue to investigate the corruption as the Chief Constable assumes control of the station.
131	17	"From Buffalo with Love"	Peter Mitchell	Michell Ricci	March 14, 2016	1.37
A man is murdered during a performance at an infamous burlesque club. Crabtree becomes involved with one of the performers while Murdoch and Inspector Brackenreid travel to Buffalo to discover the identity of the victim.
132	18	"Cometh the Archer"	Peter Mitchell	Peter Mitchell, Simon McNabb and Jordan Christianson	March 21, 2016	1.54
Doctor Ogden is shot and Murdoch is abducted by an old enemy.

=== Season 10 (2016–2017) ===
No. overall	No. in season	Title	Directed by	Written by	Original release date	Can. viewers (millions)
133	1	"Great Balls of Fire, Part One"	Gary Harvey	Peter Mitchell	October 10, 2016	1.40
Debutantes seeking to court a wealthy gentleman are murdered one-by-one. Meanwhile, Julia experiences post-traumatic stress from her near-death experience.
134	2	"Great Balls of Fire, Part Two"	Gary Harvey	Peter Mitchell	October 17, 2016	1.41
Murdoch closes in on the debutante murderer and Julia faces her demons as a great fire tears through the heart of Toronto. Contains actual footage from the fire, which is blended in with the story line.
135	3	"A Study in Pink"	Norma Bailey	Paul Aitken	October 24, 2016	1.31
Murdoch is reunited with Freddie Pink, his childhood friend turned private investigator, when she claims that one of her clients has been murdered. However, a missing body and evidence implicating Freddie suggests that she knows more about the case than she is saying.
136	4	"Concocting a Killer"	Norma Bailey	Simon McNabb	October 31, 2016	1.30
New scientific evidence results in the exoneration of a man Murdoch helped put away for murder twelve years previously. Although Murdoch still believes the man to be guilty, he is removed from the new investigation. Detective Watts from Station House One takes over.
137	5	"Jagged Little Pill"	Harvey Crossland	Carol Hay	November 7, 2016	1.42
Murdoch and Ogden investigate the poisoning of a philandering businessman. Meanwhile, Rebecca James has suspicions about a fellow medical student's suicide.
138	6	"Bend It Like Brackenreid"	Cal Coons	Michelle Ricci	November 14, 2016	1.33
As Murdoch investigates the strange death of a footballer, Brackenreid gets caught up in the team's run for the Olympics.
139	7	"Painted Ladies"	Harvey Crossland	Mary Pedersen	November 21, 2016	1.34
A serial killer begins murdering men with cyanide laced lipstick, and all the murders seem to be connected to Crabtree's girlfriend, Nina Bloom.
140	8	"Weekend at Murdoch's"	Eleanore Lindo	Jordan Christianson	November 28, 2016	1.30
Key witnesses against an accused murderer are killed one by one. To catch the hitman, Murdoch makes it seem like the last witness is still alive.
141	9	"Excitable Chap"	Cal Coons	Peter Mitchell and Simon McNabb	December 5, 2016	1.24
A lecherous criminal known as The Lurker causes mischief in Toronto, and James Pendrick returns to town with a newly invented energy drink which may hold the key to eternal youth.
–	S02	"Once Upon a Murdoch Christmas"	TW Peacocke	Michelle Ricci, Carol Hay and Paul Aitken	December 12, 2016	1.40
A criminal takes on the role of a superhero from Crabtree's recently published graphic novel and commits a series of robberies against Toronto's upper class.
142	10	"The Devil Inside"	Eleanore Lindo (Note: This episode includes numerous clips from previous episodes ("Murdoch in Toyland", "Crime & Punishment", "Big Murderer on Campus", "The Murdoch Trap", "Midnight Train to Kingston", and "Kung Fu Crabtree"). The writers and directors of these episodes are credited as excerpt writers (Paul Aitken, Graham Clegg, Carol Hay, Peter Mitchell, and Philip Bedard & Larry Lalonde) and excerpt directors (Laurie Lynd, Cal Coons, Don McCutcheon, Michael McGowan, and John L'Ecuyer) respectively.)	Paul Aitken	January 9, 2017	1.40
Brackenreid has left Station House Four in order to accompany James Pendrick on his quest to Panama to retrieve his potion of youth. In his absence, Murdoch is appointed acting inspector, and must deal with a murderer who claims to be possessed by the spirit of Murdoch's arch-nemesis, James Gillies.
143	11	"A Murdog Mystery"	Don McCutcheon	Lori Spring	January 16, 2017	1.41
A wealthy woman's dog is murdered shortly before a high stakes dog show. Murdoch reluctantly investigates after being ordered by the owner's brother-in-law – the mayor. Meanwhile, Detective Watts returns and begins investigating a tenuous link between several missing persons cases from the past few years.
144	12	"The Missing"	Renuka Jeyapalan	Maureen Jennings	January 23, 2017	1.41
The supposed heir to a large fortune miraculously reappears twenty years after being kidnapped and presumed dead. Murdoch attempts to determine whether the man really is who he says he is, but the case becomes increasingly complex when two bodies are found. Back at the station, Detective Watts continues his missing persons investigation.
145	13	"Mr. Murdoch's Neighbourhood"	Jill Carter	Carol Hay	February 6, 2017	1.37
Murdoch and Ogden bury a cadaver on their land in preparation for a forensics training exercise. When the site is excavated six months later, multiple bodies are found. Elsewhere, Detective Watts attempts to track down a mysterious woman who appears to be the key to his missing persons investigation.
146	14	"From Murdoch to Eternity"	Jill Carter	Simon McNabb	February 13, 2017	1.35
Brackenreid returns from Panama with the news that James Pendrick has been murdered. Even more astonishing, however, is the fact that he appears to have been rejuvenated by Pendrick's youth potion. When Murdoch starts aggressively marketing the potion, offering eternal life to the highest bidder, Crabtree becomes dismayed by the detective's disinterest in solving Pendrick's murder and starts his own investigation.
147	15	"Hades Hath No Fury"	Leslie Hope	Michelle Ricci	February 20, 2017	1.45
Detective Watts' missing persons case comes to a head when one of the women he has been searching for is killed in a bombing. In the ensuing investigation, Watts and Murdoch discover the rest of the missing women have been living in a commune for abused or wronged women, where men are not allowed. Needing someone on the inside, Murdoch asks Freddie Pink to infiltrate the group.
148	16	"Master Lovecraft"	Leslie Hope	Jordan Christianson	February 27, 2017	1.30
When a badly decomposed body is found in an empty building, Murdoch's prime suspect is a death-obsessed young man named H. P. Lovecraft.
149	17	"Hot Wheels of Thunder"	Peter Mitchell	Peter Mitchell, Simon McNabb and Jordan Christianson	March 13, 2017	1.36
Murdoch investigates the death of an expert roller skater. Meanwhile, Miss James enters a roller race against a group of women who have slighted her, and George faces relationship issues.
150	18	"Hell to Pay"	Peter Mitchell	Peter Mitchell	March 20, 2017	1.23
Murdoch goes underground after becoming the prime suspect in the murder of a burlesque dancer who was found dead in his bed. While Station House Four protest his innocence, the newly reappointed Chief Constable Davis and the corrupt head of the City Council spearhead an aggressive manhunt for the missing detective.

=== Season 11 (2017–2018) ===
Season 11 saw the return of Alexander Graham Bell and Theodore Roosevelt. Helen Keller, Anne Sullivan and Dr. William Osler made guest appearances as well. Dylan Neal reprised his role as Jasper Linney, Murdoch's half-brother, during the Christmas special, last seen in the season two finale.

Mouna Traoré, who played Rebecca James, left the show in episode two, with a guest appearance in episode seventeen. In episode four, Shanice Banton joined the cast in a recurring role as Violet Hart, a medical student and Julia's new morgue assistant.

No. overall	No. in season	Title	Directed by	Written by	Original release date	Can. viewers (millions)
151	1	"Up from Ashes"	Don McCutcheon	Peter Mitchell	September 25, 2017	1.22
Murdoch has been wrongfully imprisoned for the murder of a burlesque dancer, Julia has been kidnapped, Brackenreid is missing, Constables Jackson and Crabtree have ostensibly been killed and Station House Four has fallen under the thumb of a corrupt city councillor. Murdoch's few remaining allies are forced underground as they work to set things right.
152	2	"Merlot Mysteries"	Don McCutcheon	Peter Mitchell and Simon McNabb	October 2, 2017	1.19
A wine connoisseur is poisoned at his son's wedding after threatening to expose a fraud within the burgeoning Canadian winemaking industry. Detective Watts takes the opportunity to introduce the teetotal Murdoch to the world of wine tasting. Meanwhile, Miss James faces racial discrimination while applying for a job.
153	3	"8 Footsteps"	Laurie Lynd	Paul Aitken	October 9, 2017	1.18
A man is murdered at a dark dining event in honour of Helen Keller. Alexander Graham Bell, also in attendance, has secretly made an audio recording of the entire dinner, and the sound of eight mysterious footsteps on the recording is the only clue Murdoch has to work with.
154	4	"The Canadian Patient"	Laurie Lynd	Simon McNabb	October 16, 2017	1.18
A patient dies on the operating table during a public demonstration of a dangerous and controversial new procedure – an organ transplant. Refusing to accept the consensus that he botched the operation, the lead surgeon becomes convinced that his equipment was sabotaged and turns to Murdoch for help.
155	5	"Dr. Osler Regrets"	Alison Reid	Dan Trotta	October 23, 2017	1.14
Julia's mentor, William Osler, makes the papers when his tongue-in-cheek suggestion that all men over the age of sixty should be euthanized with chloroform is printed as fact. Despite initially dismissing the reports as sensationalist nonsense, Osler's words soon come back to haunt him when a killer starts chloroforming elderly men.
156	6	"21 Murdoch Street"	Harvey Crossland	Natalia Guled	November 6, 2017	1.07
When the sons of an Indian emissary disappear from their boarding school, Murdoch's investigation is hampered by their uncooperative classmates. Hoping to get inside information, he sends Constables Brackenreid and Crabtree undercover.
157	7	"The Accident"	Alison Reid	Mary Pedersen	November 13, 2017	1.25
A traffic collision results in Dilton Dilbert (David Hewlett) being pinned between a carriage and a motor car, and medical investigation reveals that any attempt to free him will result in his death. Evidence that the car has been sabotaged leads Murdoch to suspect that the crash may not have been an accident, and he sets out to uncover the truth as Brackenreid comforts the dying Dilbert.
158	8	"Brackenreid Boudoir"	Harvey Crossland	Peter Mitchell	December 4, 2017	1.17
Murdoch and Ogden stumble across the corpse of an amateur painter while camping. The fellow members of his painting club, who were camped near the crime scene, prove unhelpful. Hoping to find the murderer, Brackenreid goes undercover and rediscovers his talent for art, gaining the attention of a fickle patron who has him paint her in the nude.
159	9	"The Talking Dead"	Eleanore Lindo	Lori Spring	December 11, 2017	1.24
A series of obituaries are published for a group of seemingly unrelated people, all of whom are still alive. Among the list is Detective Watts. When a murderer starts killing the people named in the obituaries, Murdoch and Watts scramble to find the killer before they strike again.
–	S03	"Home for the Holidays"	Gary Harvey	Peter Mitchell and Simon McNabb	December 18, 2017	1.20
Murdoch and Ogden travel to Victoria to spend the holidays with Murdoch's brother, Jasper. Once there, they are called upon to solve an archaeologist's murder, and become embroiled in a land dispute between the indigenous Songhees and Haida people. Back in Toronto, the Brackenreids are conned out of their life savings by a young Italian named Charles Ponzi, and develop a scam involving Crabtree, Higgins, Nina Bloom and Ruth Newsome in order to get it back.
160	10	"F.L.A.S.H.!"	Eleanore Lindo	Paul Aitken	January 8, 2018	1.25
James Pendrick returns to Toronto, seeking investors for his newest invention, a high-speed vactrain. When one of Pendrick's employees is killed, Murdoch suspects that he may have been a spy engaging in industrial espionage for the steamship industry.
161	11	"Biffers and Blockers"	Megan Follows	Dan Trotta	January 15, 2018	1.31
An amateur cricketer is killed by an exploding bat during the annual "gentlemen vs professionals" match, and Murdoch suspects an exiled Serbian Count may have been the intended victim. During the investigation, Brackenreid and Murdoch get a glimpse into Higgins' new-found upper class lifestyle.
162	12	"Mary Wept"	Megan Follows	Noelle Girard	January 22, 2018	1.28
A statue of the Virgin Mary at Murdoch's local church starts weeping blood. The subsequent discovery of an infant's skeleton buried in the churchyard and the apparent suicide of a parishioner lead Murdoch and Watts to suspect the miracle may have been staged in order to bring a long-hidden crime to light. Julia is unsettled by Miss Hart's lack of sympathy in the morgue, and becomes even more concerned when she lies to Murdoch about her faith.
163	13	"Crabtree à la Carte"	Leslie Hope	Simon McNabb	January 29, 2018	1.41
When an acerbic cooking contest judge contracts botulism after eating tainted meat, Murdoch must determine whether the man was intentionally poisoned. Crabtree fears for his life when it emerges that both he and Margaret Brackenreid have also eaten the suspect meat.
164	14	"The Great White Moose"	Leslie Hope	Paul Aitken and Graham Clegg	February 5, 2018	1.15
Theodore Roosevelt sneaks into Canada to hunt a fabled white moose. Terrence Meyers enlists Murdoch's help in solving a seemingly unrelated locked room murder, but Murdoch soon uncovers a bizarre plot to assassinate the American president, which seems to be spearheaded by a legendary Spanish assassin, El Noche.
165	15	"Murdoch Schmurdoch"	Sherren Lee	Lori Spring and Robert Rotenberg	February 26, 2018	1.30
A Jewish man is murdered at a Yiddish theatre fundraiser, during a performance by the Jolson Brothers. During the investigation, Watts learns of his Jewish heritage.
166	16	"Game of Kings"	Peter Mitchell	Maureen Jennings	March 5, 2018	1.16
Tensions flare between Russian and Polish chess players at a tournament when a Russian master is murdered by someone dressed as a Polish hussar. Crabtree and Nina Bloom go undercover, and discover that the murder may be related to Szczerbiec, a Polish Crown Jewel that was believed to be in the possession of the Russian Empire.
167	17	"Shadows Are Falling"	Sherren Lee	Mary Pedersen	March 12, 2018	1.21
Murdoch and Ogden's relationship crumbles when Julia suffers a miscarriage and William's past misgivings about Julia's prior abortion resurface. The grieving couple are immediately pulled back into work when Nate Desmond is accused of the murder of a man he was seen fighting with.
168	18	"Free Falling"	Peter Mitchell	Simon McNabb, Mary Pedersen and Dan Trotta	March 19, 2018	1.39
Believing his relationship to be irreparably damaged, Murdoch avoids facing his issues by skipping work and helping a barfly track down his estranged wife, leaving Watts to investigate the discovery of a limbless torso. Violet Hart colludes with Inspector McWorthy to have Julia ousted from her job on the grounds that her miscarriage has left her unable to perform her duties. Crabtree is forced to accept that he and Nina want different things from life when she accepts a job in Paris; unable to reconcile their differences, the two split up. A heart-to-heart with the newly single Crabtree leads Murdoch to make amends with Julia.

=== Season 12 (2018–2019) ===
Unlike seasons nine through eleven, the twelfth season of Murdoch Mysteries did not include a Christmas movie, opting instead for an "out of the box" Halloween episode. Former Canadian Olympic figure skater Elvis Stojko guest-starred in episode 13 as ex-con Sam Marshal, who Murdoch suspects of murder. The episode also saw the return of Dmitry Chepovetsky as Nikola Tesla, whose last appearance was nine years ago in season 3, episode 13. Colin Mochrie reprises his role from last season as Ralph Fellows and Patrick McKenna returned as Inspector Hamish Slorach, last seen in season eight. The season averaged 1.1 million viewers in Canada on CBC from September 24, 2018, to March 4, 2019.

No. overall	No. in season	Title	Directed by	Written by	Original release date	Can. viewers (millions)
169	1	"Murdoch Mystery Mansion"	Gary Harvey	Peter Mitchell	September 24, 2018	1.00
Murdoch and Ogden throw a housewarming party upon completion of their new avant-garde home, which was designed by Frank Lloyd Wright. The party is cut short when a man is cooked to the point of exploding in Murdoch's closet-sized microwave prototype. Despite officially retaining her position as city coroner, Julia has returned to medical school to study surgery, leaving Violet Hart to run the morgue day-to-day. Violet uses this to bolster her attempts to take over the morgue. Higgins quits the constabulary after clashing with Brackenreid.
170	2	"Operation: Murder"	Harvey Crossland	Mary Pedersen	October 1, 2018	N/A
When one of Julia's patients dies after a seemingly successful surgery, she refuses to accept that it may have been her fault and becomes obsessed with the idea that it was murder. She enlists a reluctant Murdoch to investigate, and the two discover an unusual pattern of deaths among alcoholics in the ward. Crabtree has a brief courtship with a nursing student, Florence Nightingale Graham. He encourages her to sell a face cream she concocted; when it becomes a success, she elects to sell it under the name Elizabeth Arden and relocates to New York City to further her enterprise.
171	3	"My Big Fat Mimico Wedding"	Gary Harvey	Simon McNabb	October 8, 2018	1.06
The eccentric Newsome family comes together for Higgins and Ruth's wedding, which quickly derails amidst disapproving relatives, jealous suitors, and a guest who keeps trying to murder Henry. Crabtree is blackmailed by the maid of honour, Effie Newsome, who forces him to help her steal a family heirloom. In the process, he attracts the unwanted attentions of a lustful bridesmaid.
172	4	"Murdoch Without Borders"	Harvey Crossland	Dan Trotta	October 15, 2018	N/A
The passing of Canada's 1906 immigration act leads to the mass deportation of criminal, unemployed, and sick migrants. Brackenreid bends the rules and helps a Greek carpenter avoid expulsion, a decision which blows up in his face when the man becomes the prime suspect in the murder of the Toronto immigration officer. A subsequent series of xenophobic articles by Louise Cherry incite violence against the local Greek community, leading Murdoch to suspect that Greek immigrants are being deliberately demonized as part of a larger conspiracy.
173	5	"The Spy Who Loved Murdoch"	Alison Reid	Simon McNabb	October 22, 2018	1.06
Canada is chosen as neutral ground for the signing of the Triple Entente treaty, but proves to be anything but when the French signatory is murdered. With the threat of German invasion looming in Europe, Terrence Meyers forces Murdoch to pose as the French delegate in a desperate attempt to sign the treaty and prevent a world war.
174	6	"Sir. Sir? Sir!!!"	Craig David Wallace	Peter Mitchell	October 29, 2018	1.02
An alien species intent on wiping out the human race invades Toronto, and Crabtree becomes humanity's last hope for salvation.
175	7	"Brother's Keeper"	Craig David Wallace	Paul Aitken	November 5, 2018	1.09
When the sadistic criminal who tortured and murdered Detective Watts' adoptive brother is exonerated and released from prison, Watts kills him. Despite claiming self-defense, discrepancies in Watts' statement lead Murdoch to suspect that Watts took justice into his own hands and murdered the man in revenge for his brother's death. Crabtree hires Higgins as a trainee mechanic at his automobile repair shop.
176	8	"Drowning in Money"	Alison Reid	Noelle Girard	November 12, 2018	1.09
Murdoch investigates the apparent double suicide of a wealthy couple who drowned in their swimming pool. Crabtree is sued over a faulty repair job by Higgins which has caused an accident, and butts heads with the plaintiff's attorney, Effie Newsome.
177	9	"Secrets and Lies"	Leslie Hope	Peter Mitchell	November 26, 2018	1.05
When Brackenreid travels to St. Marys at the behest of a former lover without informing his family or friends, John Brackenreid becomes increasingly concerned about his father's safety and sets out to find him.
178	10	"Pirates of the Great Lakes"	Leslie Hope	Dan Trotta	January 7, 2019	1.22
An Italian detective implores Murdoch to investigate when treasures stolen from a Neapolitan museum are smuggled into Toronto. When one of the thieves is found dead, Crabtree goes undercover as a wealthy antiques collector in order to lure out the killer. Hoping to take the financial strain off Henry, Ruth gets a job as an apprentice nurse. Believing his marriage to be over, Brackenreid bids farewell to John and leaves home for good with Dan Seavey on the Wanderer.
179	11	"Annabella Cinderella"	Sherren Lee	Paul Aitken	January 14, 2019	1.16
Constables Crabtree and Brackenreid are tasked with transporting a convicted axe murderer to prison. When she escapes during transit and returns to her home town, supposedly seeking revenge on all those who helped to convict her, Detective Watts steps in to help recapture her. Murdoch and Ogden are disappointed when a police handbook outlining the latest investigative techniques fails to mention any of their scientific innovations. With the backing of a publisher, the two start writing their own book on the subject.
180	12	"Six of the Best"	Sherren Lee	Lori Spring	January 21, 2019	1.08
Murdoch's distressing childhood memories are evoked while investigating the death of an orphan under the care of the same Jesuit priest who taught him.
181	13	"Murdoch and the Undetectable Man"	Mina Shum	Paul Aitken	January 28, 2019	1.10
Inventor Nikola Tesla assists Murdoch in an investigation into the death of a man experimenting with invisibility.
182	14	"Sins of the Father"	Mina Shum	Simon McNabb	February 4, 2019	1.19
Murdoch investigates an apparent arson death, and reveals a personal history in the process.
183	15	"One Minute to Murder"	Mars Horodyski	Maureen Jennings	February 11, 2019	1.15
A man is electrocuted during a typing contest, but Murdoch suspects that he wasn't the intended target.
184	16	"Manual for Murder"	Warren P. Sonoda	Paul Aitken and Robert Rotenberg	February 18, 2019	1.05
A series of murders occurs after Murdoch and Dr. Ogden's book is released. Excerpts written by Carol Hay, Paul Aitken, Alexandra Zarowny, Mary Pedersen and Dan Trotta; Excerpts directed by Laurie Lynd, Cal Coons, Farhad Mann, Harvey Crossland and Alison Reid
185	17	"Darkness Before the Dawn, Part One"	Peter Mitchell	Mary Pedersen	February 25, 2019	1.17
Murdoch goes after a promotion during a raid on an opium den where a constable is shot.
186	18	"Darkness Before the Dawn, Part Two"	Peter Mitchell	Simon McNabb	March 4, 2019	1.11
Murdoch suspects McWorthy is framing John for murder.

=== Season 13 (2019–2020) ===
This season, Murdoch Mysteries celebrated its 200th episode, with Lisa Norton, John Tench, Dmitry Chepovetsky, David Storch and Peter Stebbings, reprising their roles as Emma Goldman, Alexander Graham Bell, Nikola Tesla, Thomas Edison, and James Pendrick respectively. Colm Feore made a guest appearance this season as George's long lost father, George Crabtree Sr.

No. overall	No. in season	Title	Directed by	Written by	Original release date	Can. viewers (millions)
187	1	"Troublemakers"	Harvey Crossland	Peter Mitchell	September 16, 2019	1.01
Murdoch investigates when a bomb is detonated at a suffragette rally Julia is attending. Effie Newsome encourages George to take his book to a publisher, even though he has doubts about its success.
188	2	"Bad Pennies"	Harvey Crossland	Peter Mitchell	September 23, 2019	N/A
The murder of a dock worker seems linked to recent labour disputes at the wharf, but the involvement of a Pinkerton detective reveals that a past crime is motivating current events. At the hospital, Julia navigates difficult situations when a colleague makes a serious mistake in surgery.
189	3	"Forever Young"	Shereen Lee	Paul Aitken	September 30, 2019	1.14
Murdoch investigates the bizarre murder of a young woman who disappeared a decade earlier, yet somehow hasn't aged a day.
190	4	"Prodigal Father"	Yannick Bisson	Simon McNabb	October 14, 2019	N/A
A death at an investment event leads Crabtree to the father he never knew, and Murdoch to suspect he may be culpable.
191	5	"Murdoch and the Cursed Caves"	Mars Horodyski	Noelle Girard	October 28, 2019	1.02
An adventure in the woods turns scary when Murdoch, Ogden, Higgins and Ruth are stalked by a beast that killed two men. Meanwhile, back in Toronto, Brackenreid and his wife are terrorized in their home by some local children in mummers' masks.
192	6	"The Philately Fatality"	Shereen Lee	Mary Pedersen	November 4, 2019	N/A
An investigation into the murder of a wealthy and open homosexual leads Murdoch to wonder if the cause was a jilted lover or his stamp collection.
193	7	"Toronto the Bad"	Shereen Lee	Dan Trotta	November 11, 2019	0.99
A passenger riding in Higgins' cab is poisoned and subsequent murders lead Murdoch to suspect they're connected to a cold case.
194	8	"The Final Curtain"	Mina Shum	Simon McNabb	November 18, 2019	N/A
A murder is committed at the end of a play where John Brackenreid is a participant.
195	9	"The Killing Dose"	Mina Shum	Mary Pederson	November 25, 2019	0.94
Murdoch investigates an apparent suicide attempt as Julia grapples with her Hippocratic oath.
196	10	"Parker in the Rye"	Mars Horodyski	Dan Trotta	January 6, 2020	1.06
The family of a rye distiller is murdered, except for the son, who cannot remember what happened. Suspects involve a local racketeer, the distiller's aide of 20 years and guns-for-hire. Unofficial constable Parker is sent undercover in hopes of catching the murderer(s).
197 (Note: "Staring Blindly into the Future" is billed as the 200th episode.)	11	"Staring Blindly into the Future"	Harvey Crossland	Paul Aitken, Noelle Girard, Mary Pederson, and Dan Trotta	January 13, 2020	1.11
James Pendrick invites the greatest minds and achievers to a symposium in a Toronto hotel, though he is unable to attend. Some of the attendees mysteriously vanish shortly after placing orders for room service.
198	12	"Fox Hunt"	Craig David Wallace	Simon McNabb	January 20, 2020	0.99
Inspector Brackenreid and his wife are invited to a fox hunt where a man is discovered in a fresh, shallow grave. Meanwhile, Julia finds her next-door neighbour acting suspiciously after his wife has seemingly disappeared.
199	13	"Kill Thy Neighbour"	Craig David Wallace	Mary Pederson and Noelle Girad	January 27, 2020	0.99
Murdoch's neighbour ends up murdered and all evidence points to Murdoch, leaving his colleagues to prove his innocence.
200	14	"Rigid Silence"	Shamim Serif	Maureen Jennings	February 3, 2020	0.96
Murdoch and Julia travel to Kingston Penitentiary to investigate a suspicious prison suicide.
201	15	"The Trial of Terrence Myers"	Gary Harvey	Paul Aitken	February 10, 2020	N/A
Murdoch, Ogden and Brackenreid are called to a tribunal where Terrence Meyers is accused of attempting to assassinate Prime Minister Wilfrid Laurier.
202	16	"In the Company of Women"	Gary Harvey	Lori Spring	February 17, 2020	N/A
A hair salon owner is murdered, but since the murder occurred outside of Murdoch's jurisdiction, Julia, Effie Newsome and Louise Cherry team up to investigate.
203	17	"Things Left Behind"	Peter Mitchell	Simon McNabb and Peter Mitchell	February 24, 2020	0.94
Murdoch suspects Violet Hart has ties to a conman's murder, Ogden flirts with danger and a team member is abducted.
204	18	"The Future is Unwritten"	Peter Mitchell	Simon McNabb and Peter Mitchell	March 2, 2020	0.99
Murdoch is convinced Violet Hart is involved in a murder, Crabtree is still a hostage and Watts' future is in jeopardy.

=== Season 14 (2021) ===
This season sees the return of Peter Keleghan, Peter Stebbings, and Matthew Bennett as Terrence Meyers, James Pendrick and Allen Clegg, respectively for a total of eleven episodes.

No. overall	No. in season	Title	Directed by	Written by	Original release date	Can. viewers (millions)
205	1	"Murdoch and the Tramp"	Yannick Bisson	Simon McNabb	January 4, 2021	0.99
When someone in the Vaudeville community is killed, Murdoch suspects the real target was Charlie Chaplin.
206	2	"Rough and Tumble"	Yannick Bisson	Peter Michell	January 11, 2021	0.97
Inspector Brackenreid's son, Bobby, is wanted for murder, but the Inspector refuses to let Murdoch investigate.
207	3	"Code M for Murdoch"	Gary Harvey	Paul Aitken	January 18, 2021	1.06
Canadian government agent, Terrence Myers, informs Murdoch that his friend, scientist/entrepreneur James Pendrick, has been kidnapped by American agent Allen Clegg.
208	4	"Shock Value"	Ruba Nadda	Maureen Jennings	January 25, 2021	0.95
A young man is found on the grounds of a university campus, electrocuted to death.
209	5	"Murder Checks In"	Mina Shum	Noelle Girard	February 1, 2021	1.13
While roughing it in the Canadian backwoods with a motley crew of other vacationers, Murdoch and Julia have to solve the murder of a disagreeable man. Meanwhile, at the precinct, Constables Higgins and Crabtree investigate the decapitation of a young woman.
210	6	"The Ministry of Virtue"	Mina Shum	Christina Ray	February 8, 2021	0.96
Murdoch investigates the murder of a harlot who was set up for a marriage transaction.
211	7	"Murdoch Escape Room"	Warren P. Sonoda	Paul Aitken	February 15, 2021	1.06
Murdoch, Ogden, Brackenreid and Crabtree are trapped in a deadly escape room while Watts and Louise Cherry investigate a year-old murder that is connected to Ralph Fellows.
212	8	"The Dominion of New South Mimico"	Ruba Nadda	Simon McNabb	February 22, 2021	0.97
Murdoch and Watts are invited to the old Newsome estate, where Rupert Newsome has declared the entire area a sovereign country and asks the pair to help solve a murder.
213	9	"The .38 Murdoch Special"	Sharon Lewis	Simon McNabb and Caleigh Bacchus	March 1, 2021	1.09
Murdoch investigates a murder linked to an opium den. Brackenreid investigates a missing persons case and the cases soon become connected.
214	10	"Everything is Broken, Part One"	Peter Mitchell	Story by : Peter Mitchell; Teleplay by : Paul Aitken, Simon McNabb, Noelle Girard, Christina Ray and Caleigh Bacchus	March 8, 2021	1.05
215	11	"Everything is Broken, Part Two"	Peter Mitchell	Story by : Peter Mitchell; Teleplay by : Paul Aitken, Simon McNabb, Noelle Girard, Christina Ray and Caleigh Bacchus	March 15, 2021	1.00

=== Season 15 (2021–2022) ===
Season fifteen has twenty-four episodes, including Halloween and Christmas specials, a first for the show. Returning recurring stars include Nigel Bennett as Chief Constable Giles, Jesse LaVercombe as Jack Walker, Colin Mochrie as Ralph Fellows, Peter Stebbings as James Pendrick and Peter Keleghan as Terrence Meyers, with Keleghan's wife, Leah Pinsent, guest starring, playing his TV wife.

No. overall	No. in season	Title	Directed by	Written by	Original release date	Canadian viewers
216	1	"The Things We Do For Love, Part One"	TW Peacocke	Peter Mitchell	September 13, 2021	743,000
Murdoch travels to Montreal to search for Anna Fulford and her son while under the watchful eye of The Black Hand. He is assisted by Freddie Pink, who reveals she has assisted Fulford's escape. In Toronto, Dr. Ogden is asked to care for a wealthy donor to the hospital who has a brain tumor, Crabtree is forced to marry one of his captors to free Effie Newsome and Watts investigates the death of a Japanese woman whose family claims was being abused by her husband. Violet has legal papers drawn up to transfer vast amounts of her husband's fortune to her and then legally changes back to her maiden name.
217	2	"The Things We Do For Love, Part Two"	TW Peacocke	Peter Mitchell	September 27, 2021	N/A
218	3	"Manhunt"	Yannick Bisson	Paul Aitken	October 4, 2021	N/A
Murdoch pursues Inspector Giles after he escapes from prison to vindicate a murderer.
219	4	"Blood on the Tracks"	Yannick Bisson	Noelle Girard	October 11, 2021	N/A
When their train derails, Ogden and Brackenreid suspect it was sabotage to hide a murder.
220	5	"Love or Money"	Sharon Lewis	Noelle Girard	October 18, 2021	N/A
When Murdoch investigates the murder of a ladies man, Crabtree's aunt is the prime suspect.
221	6	"I Know What You Did Last Autumn"	Craig David Wallace	Simon McNabb	October 25, 2021	883,000
On Halloween, Murdoch pursues a killer dressed as a clown who is terrorizing romantic, young couples.
222	7	"The Incorrigible Dr. Ogden"	Craig David Wallace	Christina Ray	November 1, 2021	N/A
To solve an inmate's murder, Murdoch sends Ogden undercover at a woman's reformatory. Watts has to see a man about a peacock.
223	8	"Murdoch Knows Best"	Don McCutcheon	Simon McNabb	November 8, 2021	N/A
While investigating a stabbing, Murdoch and Brackenreid inadvertently discover spy Terrence Meyer's hidden civilian life.
224	9	"The Lady Vanishes"	Sharon Lewis	Simon McNabb	November 15, 2021	898,000
Murdoch investigates when Higgins goes missing while searching for Ruth's kidnapped sister-in-law.
225	10	"Drawn in Blood"	Don McCutcheon	Caleigh Bacchus	November 22, 2021	844,000
Murdoch suspects the murder of a nasty, satirical cartoonist has links to city politics.
226	11	"The Night Before Christmas"	Laurie Lynd	Paul Aitken	November 29, 2021	N/A
Murdoch and company's Christmas at an idyllic country estate turns deadly.
227	12	"There's Something About Mary"	Dawn Sorokolit-Burke	Carol Hay	January 3, 2022	926,000
Murdoch investigates the death of a stage manager at a going-away party for Mary Pickford.
228	13	"Murdoch on the Couch"	Eleanore Lindo	Paul Aitken and Simon McNabb	January 10, 2022	888,000
Dr. Sigmund Freud and his colleagues come to Murdoch and Julia for help investigating a death threat against him.
229	14	"The Witches of East York"	Bosede Williams	Christina Ray	January 17, 2022	859,000
After Murdoch arrests a farmer for trying to kill a woman he claims is a witch, he mysteriously dies while in custody.
230	15	"Rawhide Ralph"	Bosede Williams	Peter Mitchell	January 24, 2022	935,000
When Murdoch's son, Harry, is visiting Canada, he and Julia are abducted by Ralph Fellows. Meanwhile, Watts investigates the murder of the wife of his former lover, Jack Walker.
231	16	"It's a Wonderful Game"	Cat Hostick	Maureen Jennings	January 31, 2022	979,000
A charity basketball game takes a turn for the worse when a friend of James Naismith, the game's inventor, is found dead. Meanwhile, Watts learns that the circumstances surrounding Clara Walker's death are not what he believes.
232	17	"Bloodlines"	Rama Rau	Caleigh Bacchus	February 21, 2022	N/A
Violet Hart investigates when a protester dies at an event for Black people's rights
233	18	"Patriot Games"	Jennifer Liao	Simon McNabb and Jennifer Lee	February 28, 2022	N/A
Murdoch investigates when a Japanese spy is found dead in a Korean family's cellar
234	19	"Brother Can You Spare a Crime"	Yuri Yakubiw	Nisha Khan	March 7, 2022	N/A
A vagrant camp is opposite a house where a murder took place, hence the family suspect one of those homeless people committed the murder. Murdoch investigates the robbery and murder and other facts come to light.
235	20	"Pendrick's Planetary Parlour"	Jennifer Liao	Paul Aitken	March 14, 2022	858,000
Murdoch has to investigate after a murder is transmitted over James Pendrick's new invention.
236	21	"Devil Music"	Thyrone Tommy	Andrea Scott	March 21, 2022	796,000
Murdoch investigates the death of a musician whose murder was narrated in a blues song
237	22	"Sweet Amelia"	Elsbeth McCall	Molly Clayton and Peter Mitchell	March 28, 2022	N/A
When Crabtree's mentally-deranged kidnapper, Amelia, turns herself in, he braces for trouble.
238	23	"Pay the Piper"	Peter Mitchell	Story by : Paul Aitken, Simon McNabb, Noelle Girard, Christina Ray and Caleigh Bacchus; Teleplay by : Simon McNabb, Noelle Girard, Christina Ray and Caleigh Bacchus	April 4, 2022	821,000
When a man resembling Murdoch is shot, he must find the killer before the killer finds him.
239	24	"Close Encounters"	Peter Mitchell	Story by : Paul Aitken, Simon McNabb, Noelle Girard, Christina Ray and Caleigh Bacchus; Teleplay by : Simon McNabb, Noelle Girard, Christina Ray and Caleigh Bacchus	April 11, 2022	N/A
With his family in hiding, Murdoch tries to discover who is behind attempts on their lives.

=== Season 16 (2022–2023) ===
Season 16 also marked the 250th episode, which was filmed in black and white.

Jesse LaVercombe reprised his role as Jack Walker in the two-part season premiere. Episode three features three literary characters: Rudyard Kipling, Lucy Maud Montgomery, and Edith Wharton. William S. Harley and Arthur Davidson appear when another inventor steals their ideas for motorcycles. Peter Stebbings returns as James Pendrick in episode fourteen and guest-stars alongside astronaut Chris Hadfield, portraying a rocket scientist, for the event of Halley's Comet.

Brian Paul, Peter Keleghan, John Tench and Matthew Bennett reprise their roles as Prime Minister Laurier, Terrence Meyers, Alexander Graham Bell and Allen Clegg, respectively, with this being the final appearance for Bennett. This season also marks the final appearance of James Graham as Arthur Carmichael. Olympic gold medal winner Andre De Grasse makes his first television appearance, as a shopkeeper who brags how he fast he can run.

No. overall	No. in season	Title	Directed by	Written by	Original release date
240	1	"Sometimes They Come Back, Part One"	Gary Harvey	Peter Mitchell	September 12, 2022
The team tries to unravel a case despite a corpse being missing - and discover it to be the body of Grace's father.
241	2	"Sometimes They Come Back, Part Two"	Gary Harvey	Peter Mitchell	September 19, 2022
Murdoch continues to investigate the circumstances around Violet's father's death.
242	3	"The Write Stuff"	Yannick Bisson	Derek Schreyer	September 26, 2022
The team meets Rudyard Kipling at a literary event where they become involved in a murder.
243	4	"Promising Young Ladies"	Yannick Bisson	Noelle Girard	October 3, 2022
A naked body is discovered tied to a lamppost. George's ex comes to town for a burlesque show.
244	5	"Murdoch Rides Easy"	Jason Furukawa	Simon McNabb	October 10, 2022
While Murdoch and Julia are picnicking they witness a motorcycle rider's fatal accident. During the investigation he meets William S. Harley and Arthur Davidson.
245	6	"Clean Hands"	Eric McCormack	Andrea Scott	October 17, 2022
While investigating a murder in a Mennonite community, Julia and Murdoch meet an old friend.
246	7	"Murdoch and the Sonic Boom"	Dawn Sorokolit-Burke	Paul Aitken	October 24, 2022
Murdoch discovers a plot to use sound waves as a murder weapon.
247	8	"I Still Know What You Did Last Autumn"	Dawn Sorokolit-Burke	Simon McNabb	October 31, 2022
As Halloween approaches, clown murders reoccur.
248	9	"Honeymoon in Hampshire"	Laurie Lynd	Derek Schreyer	November 7, 2022
Crabtree and Effie go on their honeymoon and not all goes as planned. Meanwhile Murdoch enlists Watts in working a case.
249	10	"Dash to Death"	Laurie Lynd	Caleigh Bacchus	November 14, 2022
Murdoch investigates a death at an Olympic practice.
250	11	"D.O.A."	Elsbeth McCall	Peter Mitchell	November 21, 2022
Julia, Violet, and the constables work to find a cure for poison before Murdoch succumbs.
251	12	"Porcelain Maiden"	Elsbeth McCall	Simon McNabb	January 2, 2023
Henry and Watts go on a chase to find a missing statue which leads to am unsolved murder. Murdoch investigates the mystery of a death.
252	13	"Vengeance Makes the Man"	Yuri Yakubiw	Andrea Scott	January 9, 2023
Brackenreid is accused of murder in another jurisdiction. Murdoch works to solve the case by uncovering who set him up.
253	14	"Murdoch at the End of the World"	Jayson Clute	Paul Aitken	January 16, 2023
The team gets involved in events related to Haley's comet.
254	15	"Breaking Ranks"	Gloria Ui Young Kim	Julie Lacey	January 23, 2023
When a death occurs at a military base, Violet questions the ruling that it was accidental.
255	16	"An Avoidable Hinder"	Gloria Ui Young Kim	Maureen Jennings	February 6, 2023
Murdoch is asked to revisit a case from his past. Brackenreid tries to keep his son Bobby from becoming a lay priest.
256	17	"Ballad of Gentleman Jones"	Rama Rau	Naben Ruthnum	February 13, 2023
Two of the team go undercover to solve the murder of a hobo.
257	18	"Virtue and Vice"	Katie Boland	Christina Ray	February 20, 2023
The solving of a murder involves discovering who had a taste for explicit art. Julia befriends an abused wife, and later becomes accused and convicted of her murder.
258	19	"Whatever Happened to Abigail Prescott"	Jennifer Liao	Caleigh Bacchus	February 27, 2023
Murdoch and team attempt to track down any evidence that could exonerate Julia.
259	20	"Just Desserts"	Jennifer Liao	Noelle Girard	March 6, 2023
Both Violet and Julia are present when a murder occurs at a party.
260	21	"Murder in F Major"	Gary Harvey	Noelle Girard	March 20, 2023
Julia meets an old flame at a musical event - and has trouble convincing him that she has no intention in renewing the relationship.
261	22	"Scents and Sensibility"	Gary Harvey	Jenny Lee	March 27, 2023
When a bride dies at her wedding, the team investigates.
262	23	"The Long Goodbye, Part One"	Peter Mitchell	Simon McNabb and Caleigh Bacchus	April 3, 2023
A new Chief is brought into Murdoch's station and he orders severe crackdowns. Brackenreid is going to retire and starts off by going to England to visit relatives. Murdoch doesn't feel he can work with the new boss and quits.
263	24	"The Long Goodbye, Part Two"	Peter Mitchell	Peter Mitchell and Noelle Girard	April 10, 2023
Murdoch is approached by Mr Crisp, a rich man with an interest in inventions, to search for his missing daughter. Watts is imprisoned for being homosexual due to the new arrest crackdown, and Crabtree tries to help him.

=== Season 17 (2023–2024) ===
Kristen Thomson plays artist Emily Carr, who is a suspect in a murder investigation, in episode three. The fifth episode is the annual Halloween special, in which Julia dreams James Gillies (played by Michael Seater) has returned. Episode nine is the traditional Christmas episode and includes a parade. Episode eleven deals with the Highland Games and was written by Maureen Jennings, with guest stars R. H. Thomson and Ian D. Clark as Scotsmen from different clans, both of whom co-starred in Road to Avonlea. Episode thirteen sees the return of both Colm Feore as George Crabtree Senior and Sarah Swire as Dorothy Ernst. Canadian author Margaret Atwood guest stars as Loren Quinnell, an amateur Ornithologist, in episode fifteen. Ted Atherton, who co-starred with Yannick Bisson in two TV series, guest stars in episode sixteen as Preacher Jimmy Wilde. Peter Keleghan returns in episode seventeen as Terrence Meyers when Prime Minister candidate Robert Borden is in danger, with his real-life wife, Leah Pinsent, reprising her role as Swedish spy and on-screen wife Laura Sollner. Episode twenty two is the show's first musical, which sees the return of Colin Mochrie and Sharron Matthews.

No. overall	No. in season	Title	Directed by	Written by	Original release date
264	1	"Do the Right Thing, Part One"	Laurie Lynd	Peter Mitchell	October 2, 2023
Julia and Murdoch are being blackmailed into aiding a woman on death row by 'proving' her innocence despite her guilt. Crabtree, acting as inspector, and the team are investigating a multiple murder. As they return to Canada by ship, Brackenreid and his wife investigate a murder on board. Crabtree becomes aware that Murdoch is missing.
265	2	"Do the Right Thing, Part Two"	Laurie Lynd	Peter Mitchell	October 9, 2023
Cases get closed and Murdoch returns to his position. Crabtree's father surfaces.
266	3	"Murdoch and the Mona Lisa"	Gloria Ui Young Kim	Noelle Girard	October 16, 2023
Murdoch investigates a murder that is tied to an art forgery.
267	4	"Bottom of the Barrel"	Yuri Yakubiw	Christina Ray	October 23, 2023
A body is found in a whiskey barrel and the team investigates.
268	5	"Station House of Horror"	Yannick Bisson	Simon McNabb	October 30, 2023
After seeing a fortune teller at the fair, the team all experience ghastly results.
269	6	"Dying to be Enlightened"	Gloria Ui Young Kim	Keri Ferencz	November 6, 2023
Julia goes to a retreat center with Watts where murder ensues.
270	7	"Cool Million"	Gary Harvey	Simon McNabb	November 13, 2023
The death of an outstanding racehorse is soon followed by the murder of its farrier.
271	8	"The Cottage in the Woods"	Sharon Lewis	Caleigh Bacchus	November 20, 2023
While on a getaway in a rustic cabin Julia, Violet, Louise, and Effie meet a girl scout who reports her leader is murdered.
272	9	"The Christmas List"	Katie Boland	Caleigh Bacchus and Peter Mitchell	November 27, 2023
The town Christmas Parade begins with Santa dropping dead. Effie's mother comes to stay at the Crabtree household.
273	10	"Mrs. Crabtree's Neighbourhood"	Katie Boland	Jenny Lee	January 1, 2024
Effie breaks her leg which leaves her free to notice odd behavior in the neighborhood. Meanwhile Murdoch's murder investigation may be tied to it.
274	11	"A Heavy Event"	Elenore Lindo	Maureen Jennings	January 8, 2024
During Highland games a competitor is killed. The chief inspector demands that members of Station House 4 participate in events they have no experience with.
275	12	"Wheel of Bad Fortune"	Elenore Lindo	Andrea Scott	January 15, 2024
Julia attends a psychic fair, and one of the psychics is guilty of murder.
276	13	"Train to Nowhere"	Elsbeth McCall	Saleema Nawaz	January 22, 2024
Crabtree travels to find his father.
277	14	"The Smell of Alarm"	Gary Harvey	Keri Ferencz	January 29, 2024
Bees suddenly begin attacking Toronto's population.
278	15	"Murdoch and the Treasure of Lima"	Cazhhmere Downey	Noelle Girard	February 5, 2024
Watts goes missing while he and Murdoch are investigating a murder in an area where a treasure hunt is occurring.
279	16	"Preacher Jimmy Wilde"	Craig David Wallace	Peter Mitchell	February 12, 2024
At a Christian revival, a man in the crowd drops dead.
280	17	"The Fantastic Mr. Fawkes"	Jayson Clute	Jason Whiting	February 19, 2024
An unconscious woman in strange circumstances is brought to Julia's clinic. A death brings Meyers and Louise in to help find the answers. As things unfold, the two cases are linked.
281	18	"Spirits in the Night"	Laurie Lynd	Christina Ray	February 26, 2024
The team investigates a murder by car. Shopkeepers experience vandalism. Soon they learn the two cases are linked.
282	19	"A Most Surprising Bond"	Jennifer Liao	Keri Ferencz	March 4, 2024
Members of the Black Hand have a relative in Julia's clinic and Murdoch and Violet are needed to assist in unravelling her medical mystery.
283	20	"Rhapsody in Blood"	Elsbeth McCall	Christina Ray	March 11, 2024
The death of a musician leads to an investigation of his rivals.
284	21	"Engaged to be Murdered"	Jennifer Liao	Julie Lacey	March 18, 2024
A murder takes place in a girl's dormitory; Crabtree and Watts have to weed through the other students to find the killer.
285	22	"Why is Everybody Singing?"	Laurie Lynd	Paul Aitken	March 25, 2024
After Murdoch is shot in the head he remains in a coma.
286	23	"Smoke Gets in Your Eyes"	Peter Mitchell	Jenny Lee and Saleema Nawaz	April 1, 2024
A man dies in a drunken fight at Violet's bar and the chief suspect turns out to be a detective from another station.
287	24	"For the Greater Good"	Peter Mitchell	Noelle Girard	April 8, 2024
Brackenreid is promoted to Chief Constable and appoints Murdoch to take his place as the head of Station House 4. Julia is offered a teaching position in England; she and Murdoch decide she will go and take their daughter Susanna with her.

=== Season 18 (2024–2025) ===
For season 18, Paul Sun-Hyung Lee was added to the cast as Inspector Albert Choi. On August 21, CBC scheduled the premiere dates for its shows. Murdoch Mysteries aired on CBC Gem first, then on CBC a week later. In another first, the premiere aired in the US on the same date as the Canadian premiere. Then, starting in January, it was available online and on TV in both countries on the same day.

Season 18 has a new opening scene, the first time since Murdoch Mysteries started, with only the main cast's names being shown when they appear in an episode. The studio where the show was filmed since season six would no longer be used after this season; the sets were taken down at the end of filming.

Murdoch Mysteries celebrated its 300th episode this season, with scenes filmed at Caledon Mountain Trout Club in Caledon, Ontario, to represent England. Guest stars included singer/actress Aqyila as singer Eudor Nadeau, Debrah Yeo of the Toronto Star, and Donal Logue as Detective Ronald Perle of the New York Metropolitan Police.

Hélène Joy is not part of the main cast for the first time, with her character living in England but returning for the 300th and 301st episodes.

The season premiere saw the return of Peter Keleghan as Terrence Meyers for his nineteenth and twentieth appearances in episodes one and seventeen, alongside Peter Stebbings as James Pendrick who had not appeared since season sixteen; one of Pendrick's inventions is a "matter of national security". Siobhan Murphy returned as Ruth Newsome, who had not appeared since season fifteen. Episode nine introduced Toronto's first Morality officer, a nod to Frankie Drake Mysteries, which also had one. Etalk's Lainey Lui appeared in episode twelve as a gossip columnist and a guest at the grand opening of the Royal Ontario Museum. Luann de Lesseps appeared in episode twenty one, as the mayor's wife. The finale guest star Katherine Ryan plays a character named Kiera Ryan, a woman ahead of her time, a stand-up comedienne.

No. overall	No. in season	Title	Directed by	Written by	Original release date
288	1	"The New Recruit"	Craig Wallace	Peter Mitchell	September 30, 2024
During a battle reenactment, a participant is killed. When Murdoch turns down the permanent position of chief inspector, Brackenreid appoints an outsider to take over the station house.
289	2	"Only Murdoch in the Building"	Katie Boland	Simon McNabb	October 7, 2024
With Julia gone, Murdoch moves into an apartment in the city and on his arrival in the building he discovers a murder. Effie and Brackenreid work on a murder case in court.
290	3	"What the Dickens?!"	Yannick Bisson	Saleema Nawaz	October 14, 2024
The Crabtrees attend a Dickens-themed party and while trying to solve a party mystery, the host is murdered. Murdoch and Inspector Choi try out a new radio direction finding tracking device invented by Murdoch.
291	4	"Gimme Shelter"	Katie Boland	Jenny Lee	October 21, 2024
While investigating a death the team discovers it is tied to a Cocaine theft.
292	5	"A Starlet is Born"	Duane Crichton	Simon McNabb	November 4, 2024
Ruth is becoming a star, but the fame attracts unwanted attention in the form of a bomb.
293	6	"The Murdoch Link"	Winnifred Jong	Noelle Girard	November 11, 2024
The battle to obtain an archaeological artefact results in the death of one of the bidders.
294	7	"Measure of My Dreams"	Elsbeth McCall	Peter Mitchell	November 18, 2024
Margaret's sister comes to stay with the Brackenreids for Christmas. Murdoch is alone for Christmas, but spends it with his Inspector solving crime. Violet gets engaged.
295	8	"Welcome to Paradise"	Elsbeth McCall	Christina Ray	January 6, 2025
While out on a bike ride with Roberts, Murdoch finds a site of multiple burials.
296	9	"When Rubber Meets the Road"	Laurie Lynd	Keri Ferencz	January 13, 2025
The leader of a local strike of workers is found murdered. Watts goes undercover to gather evidence.
297	10	"The Men Who Sold the World"	Eleanore Lindo	Peter Michell	January 20, 2025
While Murdoch visits Julia in England they are drawn into a murder investigation at a hotel where rich and influential men are meeting.
298	11	"Bombshells"	Eleanore Lindo	Noelle Girard	January 27, 2025
A bomb explodes in a shop near where Murdoch and Julia were walking, and it carries a component that is the mark of the suffragettes. A body is found in the debris.
299	12	"Star of Mandalay"	Laurie Lynd	Simon McNabb and Nick West	February 3, 2025
The team is involved with protecting the world's largest ruby.
300	13	"The Wrong Man"	Craig Wallace	Saleema Nawaz	February 10, 2025
The investigation of the murder of two women is tangled with a corrupt man who is campaigning for election as mayor.
301	14	"A Murder Most Convenient"	Sherren Lee	Jenny Lee	February 13, 2025
Two men die shortly after eating at a new restaurant that serves food in an innovative way.
302	15	"When Irish Eyes are Lying"	Gary Harvey	Peter Mitchell and Nick West	February 24, 2025
An Anti-Catholic Irishman is in town and is the target of a sharpshooter.
303	16	"Shakespeare's Beard"	Gary Harvey	Maureen Jennings	March 3, 2025
A Shakespearean actor dies in the middle of a play, and it is found that he was poisoned. The actor's family and the other actors are suspects.
304	17	"The Death of James Pendrick"	Mina Shum	Simon McNabb	March 10, 2025
A flying machine crash-lands in a street in Toronto - a connection to Pendrick is suspected, based on his prior work on air travel. Meyers shows up and informs them Pendrick is dead.
305	18	"The Incredible Astonishing Adventures of Constable George Crabtree"	Jayson Clute	Simon McNabb	March 17, 2025
Someone is on a crime spree - reenacting content from Crabtree's latest novel.
306	19	"Heir of the Dog"	Sherren Lee	Julie Lacey	March 24, 2025
When a rich man dies and leaves his fortune to his dog, the team cares for it while trying to solve the murder.
307	20	"Going Postal"	Mina Shum	Keri Ferencz	March 31, 2025
Murdoch's neighbor who works at the post office gets his help to find a person who received threatening mail. Meanwhile Julia reveals that she is staying in London for another year, and advises Murdoch not to leave his job to go to her.
308	21	"The Body Electric"	Peter Mitchell	Noelle Girard	April 7, 2025
A death is possibly associated with the proposal for a hydroelectric plant. The team has to investigate privately or risk the life of an informant.
309	22	"We Take Care of Our Own"	Peter Mitchell	Keri Ferencz	April 14, 2025
A crime boss escapes custody prior to trial. Everyone tries to take steps to stop any damage that he may cause.

=== Season 19 (2025–2026) ===
On May 1, 2025, Murdoch Mysteries was renewed for a 19th season for an additional 21 episodes. Ovation aired the nineteenth premiere on October 6, in conjunction with CBC. Luann de Lesseps reprised her role as Noelle Victoria, wife of Mayor Vaughn, in the season premiere. Jonny Harris only appeared in the second episode this season. His character returned to Newfoundland for a job promotion. Peter Keleghan appeared in the fifth episode, for his twenty-first appearance, as Terrence Meyers. Laura Vandervoort also guest-starred in the same episode as Agent DuMaurier, set in Ottawa, with the then-Prime Minister, Robert Borden. Episode seven's guest star was Coronation Street's Sally Lindsay as Nigella Fletcher, Brackenreid's British cousin and famous author, visiting Toronto. This year's Christmas episode had three special guest stars: Barenaked Ladies singer Steven Page playing a singer of the same name, Kids in the Hall actors Dave Foley as Mr. Knight and Scott Thompson as Richmond St. Clair. Siobhan Murphy also returned in the Christmas episode. Episode ten, which was filmed in Alberta, guest stars Owen Crow Shoe as Tom Three Persons and Heartland's Amber Marshall as Annie Oakley, at the first Calgary Stampede. Jason Mewes guest starred in episode twelve, as "Slippery" Bill Watson, a reformed criminal. Jann Arden appeared in episode fourteen as Pippa Pearson, co-owner of the York Lawn Tennis Club. Episode fifteen will see the return of Cyrus Lane as Rupert Newsome. Episode seventeen saw the return of Patrick McKenna, as Inspector Hamish Slorach, who hasn't been seen since the third episode of season thirteen. This episode reunites him with his Red Green Show co-star, Bob Bainborough, who guest starred as Inspector Dawes. Episode nineteen saw the return of Colin Mochrie and Michael Seater as Ralph Fellows and James Gillies, respectively. Episode twenty featured Craig Olejnik as guest star Joseph Cutter, a man who believed he had been abducted by aliens. The season finale saw Property Brothers host Drew Scott guest star as Cecil Winchester.

Yannick Bisson directed the second episode. Maureen Jennings wrote the fourteenth episode.

No. overall	No. in season	Title	Directed by	Written by	Original release date
310	1	"The Boys Are Back in Town"	Elsbeth McCall	Peter Mitchell	October 6, 2025
Murdoch and Brackenreid gather the old Station House 4 staff together in an attempt to bring the mayor down and get their jobs back.
311	2	"Diamonds in the Sand"	Yannick Bisson	Peter Mitchell	October 13, 2025
The Chief Inspector is held hostage. George and Effie have to face the toll that separation has taken on their marriage.
312	3	"Toronto's Smartest Man"	Eleanore Lindo	Saleema Nawaz	October 20, 2025
At a contest for the city's smartest man, one competitor is threatened with an attempted poisoning; Murdoch investigates, while Effie objects to being excluded based on being a woman.
313	4	"Unearthing the Past"	Elsbeth McCall	Keri Ferencz	October 27, 2025
Roberts returns to his home town and discovers two long buried bodies. Henry returns from England and Murdoch struggles with letting him have some independence as a student.
314	5	"The Borden Ultimatum"	Mina Shum	Simon McNabb	November 3, 2025
Meyers is found to be a member of a spy ring engaged in a high level plot against the Prime Minister.
315	6	"He Ain't Heavy, He's My Brother"	Katie Boland	Jenny Lee	November 10, 2025
The Chief Inspector's brother is in town when a Japanese official is kidnapped.
316	7	"Murder, She Wrote"	Sherren Lee	Peter Mitchell	November 17, 2025
Brackenreid's cousin, who is an author, visits.
317	8	"Fashion Crimes"	Mina Shum	Christina Ray	November 24, 2025
When the head of a fashion company is found murdered his housekeeper is put on trial; Effie and Murdoch investigate to free her.
318	9	"Sugar Plum Murdoch"	Katie Boland	Noelle Girard	December 1, 2025
Margaret works on a Christmas show for children and most folks in Toronto are in search of the year's most popular doll.
319	10	"Devil in the Saddle"	Laurie Lynd	Noelle Girard	January 5, 2026
Brackenreid and Murdoch travel west to see a rodeo and become involved in the death of a rider. Meanwhile Watts poses as a waiter to solve a case.
320	11	"Strangers on Paper"	Duane Crichton	Nick West	January 12, 2026
A body is found and seems linked in some way to various inventions and the city water supply.
321	12	"Tow Tags"	Giacomo Gianniotti	Peter Mitchell and Nick West	January 19, 2026
Henry takes on a second job in auto towing, and becomes involved with a turf war between two groups.
322	13	"Murdoch in Hogtown"	Craig Wallace	Jenny Lee	January 26, 2026
Louise takes a job in a slaughterhouse in order to investigate a missing-person case.
323	14	"Game Set, Murdoch"	Elsbeth McCall	Maureen Jennings	February 2, 2026
A famous tennis player goes up against a series of women with the fate of the local tennis club on the line. Accidents cause the contestants to fall injured one by one.
324	15	"Fall of the House of Newsome"	Sherren Lee	Simon McNabb	February 23, 2026
Rupert Newsome is accused of murder, and this endangers Ruth and Henry's inheritance.
325	16	"The Panic in High Park"	Vanessa Matsui	Keri Ferencz	March 2, 2026
The morality officer claims to have been attacked by a wild beast in High Park, leading to an attempt to find a wild coyote.
326	17	"The Hunting Lodge"	Craig Wallace	Saleema Nawaz	March 16, 2026
A get-together of Brackenreid and some other retired Inspectors at a hunting lodge turns sour when they are trapped inside and get picked off one by one.
327	18	"Another Brick in the Wall"	Alicia K. Harris	Faisal Lutchmedial	March 23, 2026
An investigation of a stolen painting evolves into a revelation of a decades-old murder.
328	19	"Fire in the Sky"	Jayson Clute	Noelle Girard	March 30, 2026
During a meteor shower a man turns up claiming to be someone returning from outer space.
329	20	"The Face of Evil"	Craig Grant	Keri Ferencz	April 6, 2026
Murdoch investigates when a burned truck reveals a body with links to a missing man, and at the crime scene he spots a face from the past he long thought dead.
330	21	"Hell of a Woman"	Peter Mitchell	Simon McNabb	April 13, 2026
When a man is brutally killed in a public restroom stall and robbed of his suitcase, Murdoch and the team investigate. Meanwhile, Choi romances a recently widowed old friend and considers leaving Toronto to start a new life with her.

=== Season 20 (2026) ===
The season premiere saw the return of Sally Lindsay as Nigella Fletcher whom Murdoch meets again, this time in Malta. Jason Mewes reprised his role as "Slippery" Bill Watson, in the premiere as well. Yanic Truesdale, Ennis Esmer and food critic, James Chatto appeared in the food-themed fourth episode, "Off-menu Murdoch".

The show will also return to the Calgary Stampede.

No. overall	No. in season	Title	Directed by	Written by	Original release date
331	1	"The Maltese Falconer"	Laurie Lynd	Peter Mitchell	October 5, 2026
Murdoch travels to Malta to see Nigella Fletcher who is on death row for murdering her husband. Fletcher states that a Maltese tapestry her husband purchased, that is rumoured to be a treasure map, was stolen during the murder. While searching for the artifact Murdoch uncovers a second murder and eventually the culprit. Inspector Choi must confront his fears as he deals with a small gang who are attempting to extort Vivian Moon's business.
332	2	"Arcana Dei"	Laurie Lynd	Noelle Girard	October 12, 2026
Three French priests are killed in a hotel; a hooded fourth, Celeste Riveaux, escapes. Murdoch and Choi link the murders to St. Adeline's Cathedral's relic consecration. An ivory devotional—a trellis cipher—is found during the autopsy; a scroll is stolen from the reliquary. The cathedral priest suggests that the Italian weapon used in the murders suggest that Veris Dei, a secret order, is involved. Celeste, found in the morgue and rescued from attack by Violet Hart, stole the scroll. Murdoch and his son Harry decode it revealing that the scroll reveals Mary Magdalene's testament: she bore Jesus' child in Gaul. The priests protected her lineage with Celeste as the last descendant. Father Matthew Courtlauld, Harry's schoolmaster and secretly a member of Veris Dei, coerces Celeste to heal his sister but dies fleeing Murdoch.
333	3	"The Big Smoke"	Craig Wallace	Faisal Lutchmedial	October 19, 2026
In Toronto, American heavyweight champion Jack Johnson refuses a challenge from Sam Langford after an exhibition match. He and his wife, Lucille, discover his friend Aaron Willard dead in their car trunk; Violet Hart confirms the body was dumped there. Under the Mann Act, Johnson faces U.S. charges, and Brackenreid demands questioning. Murdoch's punch-force machine clears Johnson after the autopsy shows Willard died from a single blow. Suspicion falls on Johnson's mother-in-law, who hired three attackers, but she had arrived too late for the earlier murder. Murdoch then suspects Lucille of chloroform poisoning, but she misplaced her supply. Johnson reveals $20,000 was stolen; later, a bullet fired at him outside the Starbright club is stopped by the money Willard had sewn into Johnson's coat for safekeeping. Murdoch and Brackenreid discover a letter and tripod element after they find the murder location. This leads them to Emmett Spencer, Johnson's business manager, who has been filming the events. Meanwhile, Watts learns Paul Hughes died accidentally after ingesting caribou horn to appear more masculine for his father.
334	4	"Off-menu Murdoch"	Katie Boland	Nick West	October 26, 2026
The Brackenreids' restaurant investment turns deadly when garçon de cuisine (kitchen boy) Eugene Belco is found dead in a sabotaged walk-in refrigerator. The coolant gas line was cut and the door mechanism was disabled causing sulphur dioxide poisoning, but the intended target was head chef Lloyd Aleister. A discoloured knife blade points Murdoch to chef Cyril Finley as the murderer. Meanwhile, Higgins' discovery of spicy meat pastries leads him, Roberts and Choi to a robbery and a Jamaican landlady who recognizes the handwriting of her tenant, Mr. Eastman, in the robbery note.
335	5	"Missing Persons"	Katie Boland	Simon McNabb	November 2, 2026
Iona Berger cites Camille Gauthier for vagrancy after her employer, Godfrey Ambrose, is kidnapped from outside the factory. Effie Newsome is compelled to defend Camille but the judge banishes her from the courtroom to prevent her from hearing Camille's previous, "sordid" conviction. The Attorney General appoints Effie to a new women's court, which the Supreme Court of Ontario shuts down via injunction before Camille's case can be heard. Murdoch and Higgins trace the getaway vehicle to Emma Ambrose. She hoped to reclaim her father's failing business through the kidnapping but after discovering Godfrey paid Camille as a mistress she has new grounds for divorce.
336	6	"A Date with Fate"	Yannick Bisson	Keri Ferencz	November 9, 2026
Survivors of the Grand River Train crash gather for a commemoration. Murdoch equips Henry with a battery vest to film an "actuality" about Ruth's involvement. Nora Hoche arrives and calls Ruth out as a fraud then dies in a street accident. Violet notes another survivor's recent accidental death. At the event, when Luther Creel is impaled, Murdoch suspects foul play. Teddy Roberts reports three more unusual, out-of-province deaths of survivors. After an explosion, Chester Kent is killed by a tampered advertisement, confirming Murdoch's theory that survivors are being targeted. When director Frank Hogan is then pushed from a ladder; suspicion falls on Eve Hendry, the train engineer's daughter. With Roberts and Murdoch's backing, Iona Berger joins the probe. Henry saves Ruth when her "light bath" is tampered with and nearly kills her; revealing Amanda Tanner as the true target. Bert Mank is saved by Roberts from a falling planter, prompting Murdoch to move the survivors to his lab. Finding that all families received payouts except one Iona interviews Quentin Klaxon's father—his son's body was never found and no payout was made. In Murdoch's lab, David Woods blocks a projectile meant for another. Realizing the station house is unsafe, Mank and Hogan leave. Iona shows Murdoch and Choi a photo; with a beard, they recognize Hogan. Klaxon reveals himself to Mank and draws a revolver but is stopped by Murdoch and Roberts.
337	7	"The Last Tango in Toronto"	Craig Wallace	Saleema Nawaz	November 16, 2026
Vivian Moon, Inspector Choi and the Brackenreids attend a tango tea starring Felicity (Emma Slater) and Aldo Luna at the Star Bright Club. During a costume change, Felicity is stabbed with a long blade and the killer escapes. Roberts deals with fans and students who learn of the attack back stage. Iona Berger finds the sheath engraved with a Patagonian mountain range, briefly implicating Aldo, but who lacked sufficient time to have done so. During a lesson, Effie proves skilled at tango. Stage manager Minnie Simpkin finds Felicity's necklace missing—likely stolen. The next morning, Aldo is shot in the arm while with Effie on his hotel room balcony. Murdoch and Roberts question Minnie, who suspects student Gemma Baker. Choi, also a poor dancer, takes lessons from Margaret Brackenreid to impress Vivian. Thomas takes over as teacher, objecting to their privacy. Watts then discovers that Felicity's back-story—born in Paris and has danced in London, Athens and Berlin—are actually locations in Ontario (Paris, London, Athens and Berlin). Murdoch and Roberts find that Felicity's sister is alive and is dance student Agatha Marsh who had hoped to tour with Felicity and Aldo. Effie was the intended victim as Agatha feared that she would be Aldo's new dance partner. Agatha confesses that Felicity stole her savings and necklace to pursue dance. Choi impresses Vivian with his skills, and Effie departs with Aldo.

== Webisodes ==
=== The Curse of the Lost Pharaohs ===
No.	Title	Directed by	Written by	Original release date
1	"The Vanished Corpse"	Cal Coons	Patrick Tarr	June 7, 2011
2	"The Clue of the Hieroglyphs"	Cal Coons	Patrick Tarr	June 14, 2011
3	"The Long Arm of Villainy"	Cal Coons	Patrick Tarr	June 21, 2011
4	"Lost Companions and New Friends"	Cal Coons	Patrick Tarr	June 28, 2011
5	"Attack of the Scarabs"	Cal Coons	Patrick Tarr	July 6, 2011
6	"The Enigma of the Skull"	Cal Coons	Patrick Tarr	July 13, 2011
7	"An Unwelcome Surprise"	Cal Coons	Patrick Tarr	July 20, 2011
8	"Of Impossible Escapes and Joyful Reunions"	Cal Coons	Patrick Tarr	July 27, 2011
9	"An Unfortunate Turn of Events"	Cal Coons	Patrick Tarr	August 3, 2011
10	"The Key to Salvation"	Cal Coons	Patrick Tarr	August 10, 2011
11	"Her Majesty's Last Hope"	Cal Coons	Patrick Tarr	August 17, 2011
12	"Last Stand for the Empire"	Cal Coons	Patrick Tarr	August 24, 2011
13	"Humble Heroes and New Adventures"	Cal Coons	Patrick Tarr	August 31, 2011

=== The Murdoch Effect ===
No.	Title	Directed by	Written by	Original release date
1	Episode 1	Laurie Lynd	Michelle Ricci	May 24, 2012
2	Episode 2	Laurie Lynd	Michelle Ricci	May 28, 2012
3	Episode 3	Laurie Lynd	Michelle Ricci	May 31, 2012
4	Episode 4	Laurie Lynd	Michelle Ricci	June 1, 2012
5	Episode 5	Laurie Lynd	Michelle Ricci	June 6, 2012
6	Episode 6	Laurie Lynd	Michelle Ricci	June 12, 2012

=== Nightmare on Queen Street ===
No.	Title	Directed by	Written by	Original release date
1	"Chapter One: The Dead Professor"	Laurie Lynd	Michelle Ricci	February 4, 2013
2	"Chapter Two: The Blood Code"	Laurie Lynd	Michelle Ricci	February 11, 2013
3	"Chapter Three: Ciphers and Somnology"	Laurie Lynd	Michelle Ricci	February 25, 2013
4	"Interlude"	Laurie Lynd	Michelle Ricci	March 4, 2013
5	"Chapter Four: The Music of Madness"	Laurie Lynd	Michelle Ricci	March 4, 2013
6	"Chapter Five: The Vanishing Policeman"	Laurie Lynd	Michelle Ricci	March 11, 2013
7	"Chapter Six: The Chair"	Laurie Lynd	Michelle Ricci	March 18, 2013
8	"Epilogue"	Laurie Lynd	Michelle Ricci	March 25, 2013

=== The Infernal Device ===
No.	Title	Directed by	Written by	Original release date
1	"Death on the Tracks"	Laurie Lynd	Michelle Ricci, Fergus Heywood, Ryan Creighton and Mike Evans	April 8, 2015
2	"A Puzzling Development"	Laurie Lynd	Michelle Ricci, Fergus Heywood, Ryan Creighton and Mike Evans	April 15, 2015
3	"Disappearing Act"	Laurie Lynd	Michelle Ricci, Fergus Heywood, Ryan Creighton and Mike Evans	April 22, 2015
4	"Trouble is Brewing"	Laurie Lynd	Michelle Ricci, Fergus Heywood, Ryan Creighton and Mike Evans	April 29, 2015
5	"Tea for Who?"	Laurie Lynd	Michelle Ricci, Fergus Heywood, Ryan Creighton and Mike Evans	May 6, 2015
6	"A Royal Affair"	Laurie Lynd	Michelle Ricci, Fergus Heywood, Ryan Creighton and Mike Evans	May 13, 2015

=== Beyond Time ===
No.	Title	Directed by	Written by	Original release date
1	Episode 1	Mars Horodyski	Mary Pedersen	January 17, 2017
2	Episode 2	Mars Horodyski	Mary Pedersen	January 20, 2017
3	Episode 3	Mars Horodyski	Mary Pedersen	January 24, 2017
4	Episode 4	Mars Horodyski	Mary Pedersen	January 27, 2017
5	Episode 5	Mars Horodyski	Mary Pedersen	January 31, 2017
6	Episode 6	Mars Horodyski	Mary Pedersen	February 3, 2017
7	Episode 7	Mars Horodyski	Mary Pedersen	February 7, 2017
8	Episode 8	Mars Horodyski	Mary Pedersen	February 10, 2017
9	Episode 9	Mars Horodyski	Mary Pedersen	February 14, 2017
10	Episode 10	Mars Horodyski	Mary Pedersen	February 17, 2017
11	Episode 11	Mars Horodyski	Mary Pedersen	February 21, 2017
12	Episode 12	Mars Horodyski	Mary Pedersen	February 24, 2017
13	Episode 13	Mars Horodyski	Mary Pedersen	February 28, 2017
14	Episode 14	Mars Horodyski	Mary Pedersen	March 3, 2017
15	Episode 15	Mars Horodyski	Mary Pedersen	March 7, 2017
16	Episode 16	Mars Horodyski	Mary Pedersen	March 10, 2017
17	Episode 17	Mars Horodyski	Mary Pedersen	March 14, 2017
18	Episode 18	Mars Horodyski	Mary Pedersen	March 17, 2017
19	Episode 19	Mars Horodyski	Mary Pedersen	March 21, 2017
20	Episode 20	Mars Horodyski	Mary Pedersen	March 24, 2017

=== The Book of Jackson ===
No.	Title	Directed by	Written by	Original release date
1	Episode 1	Alison Reid	Noelle Girard	February 12, 2018
2	Episode 2	Alison Reid	Noelle Girard	February 12, 2018
3	Episode 3	Alison Reid	Noelle Girard	February 12, 2018
4	Episode 4	Alison Reid	Noelle Girard	February 12, 2018
5	Episode 5	Alison Reid	Noelle Girard	February 12, 2018
6	Episode 6	Alison Reid	Noelle Girard	February 12, 2018
