= Winnie Yeung =

Canadian schoolteacher and writer

Winnie Yeung is a Canadian school teacher and writer who co-wrote Homes: A Refugee Story with high school student Abu Bakr Al-Rabeeah.

== Teaching ==
In 2010, Iraqi student Al-Rabeeah moved with his family to Homs, Syria, but they were soon forced to move again due to the outbreak of the Syrian Civil War. He and his family moved to Edmonton, Alberta in 2014, where Yeung was his English as a second language teacher. She encouraged him to tell his own life stories as a way to practice English and began recording them.

== Homes ==
The co-authored memoir was self-published in 2016, before being picked up for commercial republication by Freehand Books in 2018.

It was a shortlisted finalist for the Governor General's Award for English-language non-fiction at the 2018 Governor General's Awards, and for the 2019 Shaughnessy Cohen Prize for Political Writing. It was selected for the 2019 edition of Canada Reads, where it was defended by Chuck Comeau.
