= Sarah Leavitt =

Canadian graphic novelist

- Writing career
- Notable works: Tangles, Anges, Murderess, Something, Not Nothing
- Website: http://www.sarahleavitt.com

Sarah Leavitt is a Canadian graphic novelist. She is notable for the graphic memoirs Tangles and Something, Not Nothing and the historical fiction graphic novel Anges, Murderess.

== Career ==
=== Tangles ===
Leavitt's graphic memoir Tangles: A Story About Alzheimer's, My Mother and Me, was published in 2010. It focuses on Leavitt's mother Midge's life with Alzheimer's disease and how Leavitt and her other family members' relationships with her were affected as her disease progressed. In 2026, it was adapted into an animated feature film, Tangles, which debuted at the 2026 Cannes Film Festival. Leavitt co-wrote the film's screenplay and was portrayed in the film by Abbi Jacobson, with Julia Louis-Dreyfus voicing Midge and Leah Nelson directing the film.

=== Agnes, Murderess ===
Agnes, Murderess is a 2019 historical fiction graphic novel about Agnus McVee, an alleged 19th-century serial killer in British Columbia. It won the 2020 Vine Awards for Canadian Jewish Literature in the Fiction category.

=== Something, Not Nothing ===
Something, Not Nothing: A Story of Grief and Love is a 2024 graphic memoir that collects comics Leavitt created in the two years following the death of Donimo, her partner of twenty-two years, who died in 2020 with MAiD after many years of debilitating illness and chronic pain caused by several medical conditions. It details the couple's lives leading to Donimo's health rapidly worsening in 2019 and making the choice to die with medical assistance, as well as Leavitt coming to terms with her grief in the aftermath. Kirkus Reviews called the book a "uniquely gorgeous chronicle" and gave it a starred review. It was shortlisted for both the Eisner Award for Best Graphic Memoir and the Lambda Literary Award for LGBTQ+ Comics, and was the 2024 winner of the Jim Deva Prize for Writing that Provokes.

== Personal life ==
Leavitt is Jewish-Canadian and lesbian. She is an assistant professor at the School of Creative Writing at the University of British Columbia in Vancouver.

Leavitt should not be confused with the Montreal-based CBC News journalist of the same name.

== Publications ==
- Leavitt, Sarah (September 1, 2010). Tangles: A Story About Alzheimer's, My Mother and Me. Freehand Books. ISBN 978-1551111179.
- Leavitt, Sarah (September 7, 2019). Agnes, Murderess. Freehand Books. ISBN 978-1988298474.
- Leavitt, Sarah (September 24, 2024). Something, Not Nothing. Arsenal Pulp Press. ISBN 978-1551529516.

== Accolades ==
Year	Award	Title	Result	Reference
2010	Tangles: A Story About Alzheimer's, My Mother and Me	Hilary Weston Writers' Trust Prize for Nonfiction	Shortlisted	
2011	Tangles: A Story About Alzheimer's, My Mother and Me	Hubert Evans Non-Fiction Prize	Shortlisted	
2020	Agnes, Murderess	Vine Awards for Canadian Jewish Literature - Fiction	Won	
2020	Agnes, Murderess	Doug Wright Award for Best Book	Shortlisted	
2025	Something, Not Nothing	Jim Deva Prize for Writing that Provokes	Won	
2025	Something, Not Nothing	Eisner Award for Best Graphic Memoir	Shortlisted	
2025	Something, Not Nothing	Lambda Literary Award for LGBTQ+ Comics	Shortlisted	
2025	Something, Not Nothing	Judy Grahn Award	Shortlisted	
2026	Tangles	Queer Palm	Shortlisted	
2026	Tangles	Caméra d'Or	Shortlisted	
