= Freehand Books =

Literary imprint of Broadview Press

Freehand Books is a Canadian literary imprint started in 2007 by Broadview Press, a Canadian academic publisher. Freehand publishes literary fiction, literary non-fiction, memoir and poetry.

In its first season in 2008, Freehand published Good To A Fault, by Marina Endicott. The novel won the 2009 Commonwealth Writers Prize for Canada and the Caribbean and was shortlisted for the 2008 Giller Prize.

Tangles, a graphic memoir by Sarah Leavitt, published in 2010, was the first graphic book shortlisted for the Writers' Trust of Canada non-fiction prize.

A 2014 Freehand book, Karyn L. Freedman's One Hour in Paris: A True Story of Rape and Recovery, was the winner of the $40,0000 British Columbia National Award for Canadian Non-Fiction in 2015. It was also longlisted for Canada Reads in 2017.

In 2018, Freehand published Homes: A Refugee Story, by Abu Bakr Al-Rabeeah and Winnie Yeung. It went on to become a finalist for the Governor General's Literary Award for Non-fiction and is a 2019 Canada Reads contender, championed by Chuck Comeau.

Writers published by Freehand include Marina Endicott, Susan Olding, Stuart Ross, Clea Roberts, Saleema Nawaz, Clem and Olivier Martini, Jeanette Lynes, Sarah Leavitt, Yasmin Ladha, Paul Hendrick, Joan Crate, Jesse Patrick Ferguson, Ian Williams, Elizabeth Philips, Lorna Crozier, Keith Maillard and Cary Fagan.

In 2016 Freehand (under the leadership of JoAnn McCaig) became independent of Broadview, though the two organizations continued for some years to work together in certain areas following the change in ownership structure. A further change occurred in 2021, when veteran Canadian publisher Glenn Rollans purchased the company. The editorial direction of the company has been unaffected by these ownership changes.

Melanie Little was Freehand's first managing editor; she was succeeded in that role first by Sarah Ivany and then by Kelsey Attard. Anna Boyar is currently acting as Managing Editor while Attard is on leave.

Freehand Books is based in Calgary, Alberta.
