= Abu Bakr Al-Rabeeah =

Canadian writer

Abu Bakr Al-Rabeeah is a Canadian writer, whose memoir Homes: A Refugee Story, cowritten with Winnie Yeung, was published in 2018.

Originally from Iraq, Al-Rabeeah moved with his family to Homs, Syria in 2010 to escape persecution due to their status as minority Sunni Muslims, but were soon forced to move again due to the outbreak of the Syrian Civil War. He and his family have lived in Edmonton, Alberta since 2014, and Yeung was his English as a second language teacher at the time he began to consider writing the book.

The book was self-published in 2016, before being picked up for commercial republication by Freehand Books in 2018.

It was a shortlisted finalist for the Governor General's Award for English-language non-fiction at the 2018 Governor General's Awards, and for the 2019 Shaughnessy Cohen Prize for Political Writing. It was selected for the 2019 edition of Canada Reads, where it was defended by Chuck Comeau.
