= Tangles =

2026 film by Leah Nelson

- Theatrical release poster
- Directed by: Leah Nelson
- Screenplay by: Leah Nelson; Sarah Leavitt; Trev Renney
- Based on: Tangles: A Story About Alzheimer's, My Mother and Me by Sarah Leavitt
- Produced by: Vicky Patel; Steve Barnett; Alan Powell; Seth Rogen; Evan Goldberg; James Weaver; Alex McAtee; Lauren Miller Rogen; Jennifer W. Ray; Jay Grandin; Teresa Toews; Leah Nelson; Ross Murray; Julia Louis-Dreyfus
- Starring: Julia Louis-Dreyfus; Abbi Jacobson; Bryan Cranston; Beanie Feldstein; Seth Rogen; Samira Wiley; Pamela Adlon; Pat Finn; Phil Rosenthal; Adam Shapiro; Sarah Silverman; Wanda Sykes; Bowen Yang
- Edited by: David Avery
- Music by: Dan Romer
- Production companies: Monarch Media; Point Grey Pictures; Lylas Pictures; Giant Ant Films
- Distributed by: Independent Film Company; Sapan Studio
- Release dates: May 14, 2026 (Cannes); January 15, 2027 (United States)
- Running time: 102 minutes
- Countries: United States; Canada
- Language: English

Tangles is a 2026 adult animated biographical drama film directed by Leah Nelson, co-written with Sarah Leavitt and Trev Renney, based on Leavitt's graphic novel Tangles: A Story About Alzheimer's, My Mother and Me. It stars Julia Louis-Dreyfus, Abbi Jacobson, Bryan Cranston, Beanie Feldstein, Seth Rogen, Samira Wiley, Pamela Adlon, Pat Finn, Phil Rosenthal, Adam Shapiro, Sarah Silverman, Wanda Sykes, and Bowen Yang.

The film had its world premiere at the Special Screenings section of the 2026 Cannes Film Festival on May 14, 2026, where it was nominated for the Caméra d'Or and the Queer Palm. The film is scheduled to be released in limited theaters in the United States on January 15, 2027, before expanding wide on January 22.

== Premise ==
When Alzheimer's disease begins to strip away Midge's vibrant personality, her daughter Sarah, a headstrong young woman, is forced to return to her oddball family in the conservative small town she recently fled in order to care for her. She quickly realizes she must accept the cruel and warped reality of the disease — and the imperfect beauty of her family — in order to become the daughter they need.

== Voice cast ==
- Abbi Jacobson as Sarah
  - Fern Grandin as Young Sarah
- Julia Louis-Dreyfus as Midge, Sarah's mother
- Bryan Cranston as Rob, Sarah's father
- Samira Wiley as Donimo, Sarah's girlfriend
- Beanie Feldstein as Hannah, Sarah's sister
- Seth Rogen as Zach, Hannah's boyfriend
- Pamela Adlon as Aunt Debbie
- Sarah Silverman as Aunt Sukey
- Bowen Yang as Dale, Sarah's co-worker
- Wanda Sykes as Paula, Sarah's boss
- Phil Rosenthal as Rabbi
- Adam Shapiro as Gregory
- Pat Finn as Agent Nelson
- Sugar Lyn Beard as Flight Attendant

== Production ==
In April 2024, it was announced that Julia Louis-Dreyfus would produce and star in an animated adaptation of Tangles: A Story About Alzheimer's, My Mother and Me, which would be co-written by Sarah Leavitt, the author of the graphic novel. The rest of the cast was also revealed with the announcement.

== Release ==
Tangles premiered at the Special Screenings section at the 2026 Cannes Film Festival on May 14, where it received a 7-minute standing ovation. In August 2026, Independent Film Company acquired distribution rights to the film, scheduling it for a Oscar qualifying release in New York and Los Angeles on November 27, which will be followed by a limited theatrical release on January 15, 2027, with a wide expansion planned a week later.

It had its North American premiere in the Centrepiece program at the 2026 Toronto International Film Festival.

== Reception ==
On review aggregator website Rotten Tomatoes, the film holds an approval rating of 93% based on 29 reviews, with an average rating of 8.4/10.

=== Accolades ===
Award	Date	Category	Recipient	Result	Ref.
San Sebastián International Film Festival	26 September 2026	Sebastiane Award	Tangles	Won	
