= Jesse Patrick Ferguson =

Canadian folk musician and poet

Jesse Patrick Ferguson is a Canadian folk musician and poet. He was born in Cornwall, Ontario, and has lived in Ottawa, Ontario, Fredericton, New Brunswick, and Sydney, Nova Scotia. He has produced 10 studio albums of folk music, most recently Ten (2024). He performs music publicly in Ontario, Canada, and maintains a folk-music YouTube channel under the name The Bard of Cornwall.

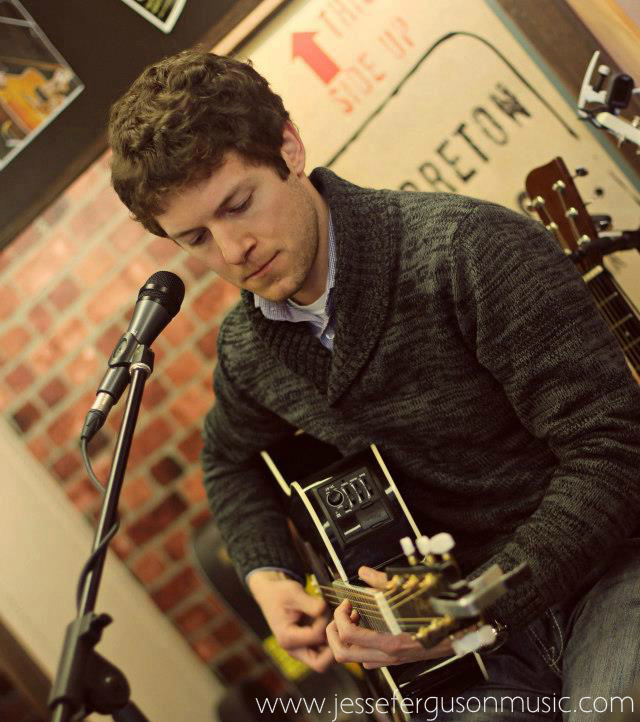
Performing in Cape Breton, Nova Scotia, 2017

His poems and reviews have been published in twelve countries, in both print and online formats, such as in Canadian Literature, The New Quarterly, Prairie Fire, Grain, Poetry Ireland Review, Poetry and Harper's. His work has also been selected for inclusion in the anthology Best Canadian Poetry in English 2009, edited by A.F. Moritz. He is a former poetry editor for The Fiddlehead, and he plays several musical instruments. In the fall of 2009, Freehand Books published his first full-length poetry collection, Harmonics. His second full-length book, consisting entirely of visual (concrete) poetry is Dirty Semiotics (Broken Jaw Press, 2011). His most recent book is Mr. Sapiens (Wolsak and Wynn, 2014).
