= Saleema Nawaz =

Canadian author (born 1979)

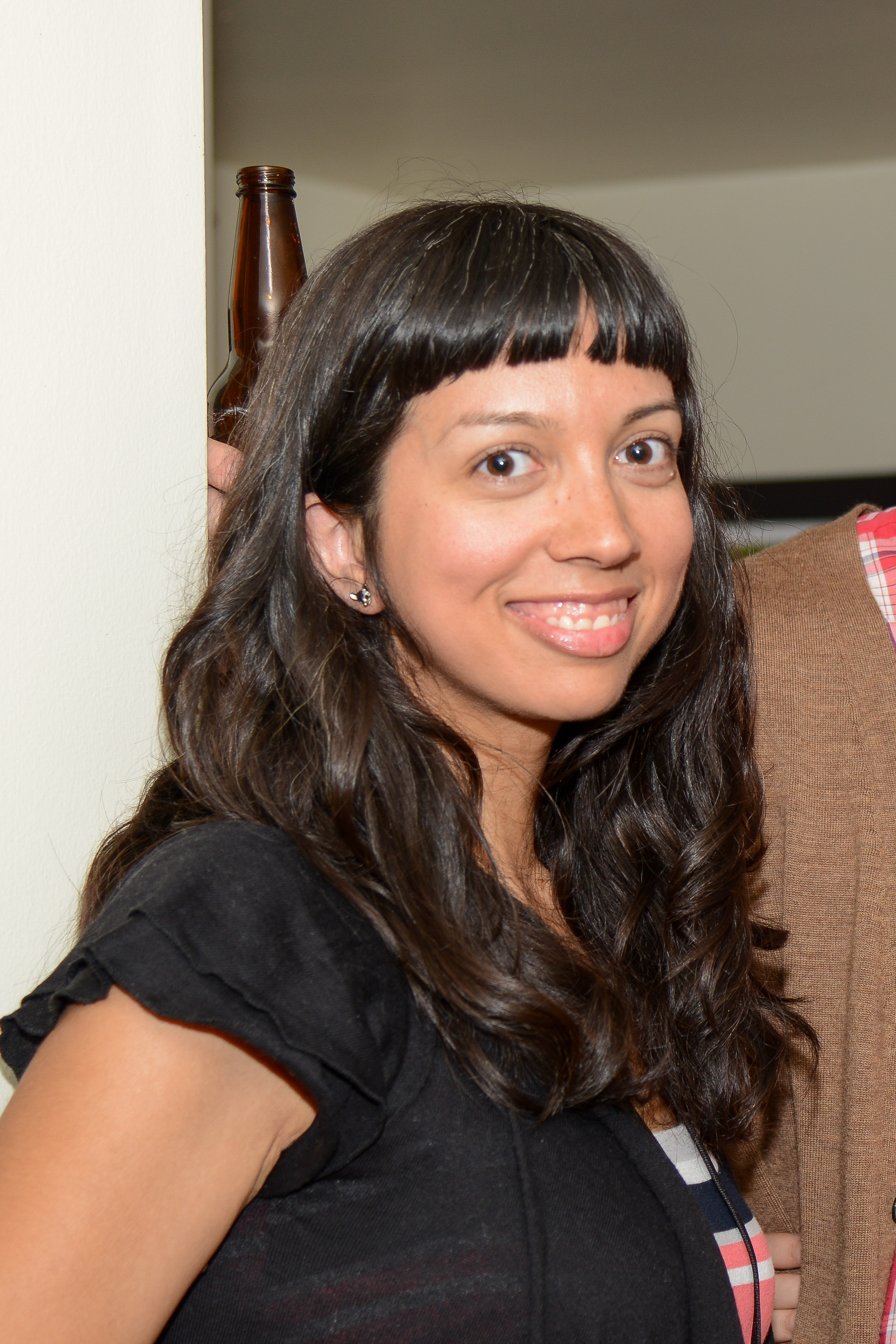
- Nawaz at the Eden Mills Writers' Festival in 2013
- Born: 1979 (age 46–47); Ottawa, Ontario, Canada
- Education: B.Hum. (Carleton University); M.A. in English (University of Manitoba)
- Occupation: Author
- Notable work: Mother Superior
- Awards: 2006 Robert Kroetsch Award; 2008 Journey Prize

Saleema Nawaz (born 1979) is a Canadian author whose works of short fiction have been published in literary journals such as Prairie Fire, PRISM International, Grain, The Dalhousie Review, and The New Quarterly. Her first complete collection of short fiction, entitled Mother Superior, was published by Freehand Books in 2008. Nawaz completed her first novel, Bone and Bread, published by Anansi Press in 2013, while residing in Montreal, Quebec.

== Biography ==
=== Early life in Ottawa ===
Saleema Nawaz was born in Ottawa, Ontario, Canada. An only child, Nawaz was raised solely by her Caucasian Nova Scotian mother in the Ottawa neighbourhood of Centretown, in the absence of her Indian father. Nawaz began showing an interest in writing fiction as early as the first grade. During her high school years she attended Lisgar Collegiate Institute, a public school near her Centretown home. Upon graduation from high school Nawaz attended Carleton University in Ottawa, where she graduated with a Bachelor of Humanities.

=== Winnipeg, Banff, and Montreal ===
After receiving a Bachelor of Humanities at Carleton, Nawaz moved to Winnipeg, Manitoba to pursue her M.A. at the University of Manitoba which offered a Creative Thesis option. Since obtaining her degree, Nawaz has attended a writing studio program at the Banff Centre for the Arts and currently resides in Montreal, Quebec where she does administrative work for McGill University.

== Writing career ==
=== Influences ===
Nawaz cites her biggest short fiction influences as Alice Munro, Tobias Wolff, and Raymond Carver.

=== Early work ===
Nawaz' novella The White Dress (which would later appear in her collection, Mother Superior) won her the Robert Kroetsch Award for Best Creative Thesis in 2006. This award is given to the writer of the best creative thesis each year out of all University of Manitoba M.A. graduates. In the following years, Nawaz published several individual short stories in various literary publications across Canada (see "List of published works" below).

=== Mother Superior ===
In 2008, Nawaz published a collection of seven stories and two novellas entitled Mother Superior. The collection includes five previously published short stories as well as two previously unpublished short stories and two previously unpublished novellas. Mother Superior has generally been met with positive reviews, was a finalist for the prestigious McAuslan First Book Prize from the Quebec Writers' Federation. The stories in Mother Superior follow a diverse cast of female protagonists struggling with issues such as racism, abuse, death, anorexia, pregnancy and motherhood. Mother Superior is published by Freehand Books.

=== Bone and Bread ===
Nawaz's first novel, Bone and Bread, was edited by Melanie Little, Anansi's former senior fiction editor. Its narrative follows two sisters and is set in Montreal. The sisters are from her previously published short story "Bloodlines" (found in The New Quarterly and as a part of Mother Superior) twenty years after their original story. In 2016, Bone and Bread was defended by Farah Mohamed on CBC's Canada Reads competition.

=== Songs for the End of the World ===
Nawaz's most recent novel, which took her seven years to write, is a dystopian novel about a coronavirus that ravages the world. Given the 'eerie similarities' to the current COVID-19 pandemic, the publisher McClelland & Stewart decided to move up the publication of the e-book to April 14, 2020. The print book was released on August 25, 2020.

== List of published works ==
=== Individual short stories ===
- "Mother Superior" in PRISM International
- "Look, But Don't Touch" in Grain
- "My Three Girls" in Prairie Fire
- "Bloodlines" in The New Quarterly
- "Scar Tissue" in The Dalhousie Review

=== Collections ===
- Mother Superior published by Freehand Books, 2008

=== Novels ===
- Bone and Bread (House of Anansi, 2013)
- Songs for the End of the World (McClelland & Stewart, 2020)

== Awards and honours ==
- Winner of the inaugural Robert Kroetsch Award for Best Creative Thesis at the University of Manitoba for her novella "The White Dress", 2006.
- Winner of the Writers' Trust of Canada's McClelland & Stewart Journey Prize for her short story "My Three Girls", 2008.
- Placed second in the Malahat Review Novella Contest for her novella "The White Dress".
- Finalist for the Quebec Writers' Federation's McAuslan First Book Prize for her collection entitled Mother Superior, 2008.
- Winner of the Quebec Writers' Federation's Paragraphe Hugh MacLennan Prize for Fiction, 2013.
