= Agnus McVee =

Canadian serial killer (died 1885)

Agnus McVee (d. 1885) was said to be a Canadian serial killer. McVee ran a hotel and store at 108 Mile House on the Cariboo Wagon Road from 1875 to 1885 during the Cariboo Gold Rush. Along with her husband Jim McVee and her son-in-law Al Riley, she is said to have killed many miners for their gold and kidnapped women for sale to miners as white slaves. The story has achieved local prominence, but documentary evidence is absent.

Her story was the subject of the 2019 graphic novel Agnes, Murderess by Canadian writer Sarah Leavitt.

== Crimes ==
The actions attributed to Agnus McVee and her accomplices are multiple murders, kidnappings, torture, and white slavery. The murders were of traveling gold miners (most likely killed for their gold). The kidnappings were of eight young women who were tied up in the hotel basement. The women were mistreated until they were obedient and then sold to miners.

== Capture and punishment ==
The story goes that a miner, Jim MacDonald, wished to buy a young girl from the McVees. Agnus agreed to sell MacDonald a 17-year-old girl. The next morning, Jim McVee followed MacDonald down the Cariboo Wagon Road. McVee murdered MacDonald and took all his money. The next morning, Agnus McVee poisoned her husband in retaliation for this murder. The girl, however, was able to escape and to identify Jim McVee to the North West Mounted Police.

Upon investigation, the police found McVee, Al Riley (her brother-in-law), Jim McVee's body, and eight young girls in the basement of the McVee's hotel. The police arrested McVee and Riley and the pair were taken to Fort Kamloops. They were charged and convicted of murder and kidnapping. They were then transported to New Westminster and incarcerated in the New Westminster jail. McVee killed herself in 1885 while in the jail by swallowing poison. Riley was hanged shortly after.

== Controversy ==
The Agnus McVee story seems to have originated from a single source: According to Maryanne Rutledge, president of the 100 Mile and District Historical Society, the story comes from an out-of-publication booklet titled "Lost Treasure in BC #3" by Larry Lazeo of Fort Langley. The author received the details from an old-timer.

The tale has become widespread in the 100 Mile district and has expanded beyond it. In 2006, Red Barn Productions filmed the story for CTV's Travel and Discovery series, intended for satellite broadcast in late September or October 2006. The story is also on a BC Government web page of historical information.

One form of evidence that is sometimes given is that caches of gold have been found in the area. Rutledge states "In 1929, there was a farmer who unearthed a cache of gold in bags. More recently, when a nearby airport was built, excavation dug up a sum of cash from that era."

However, documentary evidence for the story is absent. An article by Greg Joyce in the Prince George Citizen newspaper discusses the story of the McVee murders. He states that there are no documents of ownership of the 108 Mile Hotel during the decade that McVee is supposed to have run it. Missing persons records do not list anyone who lodged at the hotel between 1875 and 1885 as reported missing. No police records of the arrest or trial have been found "despite Rutledge's extensive searches in Kamloops, New Westminster, and in the provincial archives in Victoria." Furthermore, there are no death certificates for either McVee or Riley.
