= Yasmin Ladha =

Tanzanian-Canadian writer (born 1958)

Yasmin Ladha (born 1958) is a Tanzanian-Canadian writer of Indian descent.

== Life ==
Yasmin Ladha was born to an Indian Muslim family in Mwanza, Tanganyika. She grew up in Africa, but often visited family members in India. When she was twenty she emigrated to Canada and studied at the University of Calgary, gaining a BA and an MA in English. Her MA thesis, Circum the Gesture, was a collection of eleven creative writing pieces in multiple genres, playing with the notion of the immigrant woman as a nomad.

Ladha's first collection of stories, Lion's grand-daughter and other stories, was a finalist in the Howard O'Hagan Award for Short Fiction at the 1993 Alberta Literary Awards. The collection explored Indian Diaspora experience, emphasising the female perspective, as well as the relation between writer and reader (addressed familiarly as readerji). A second collection, Women Dancing on Rooftops, was published in 1997, when Ladha was living in Chonbuk in South Korea. Ladha has also taught at the Alberta College of Art and Design and worked in Muscat, Oman.

In 1995, Ladha was the Guest Editor for Rungh Magazine's "Food Issue", Volume 3, No. 1. She was featured in a conversation titled, "Home - Waffling with Cunning in the Border Country" in Rungh Magazine's first issue, Volume 1, No. 1 and 2, with Ramabai Espinet, and Sherazad Jamal. Ladha also reviewed the film Mississippi Masala for Rungh Magazine's "Film and Video Issue", Volume 1, Number 3.

Ladha's 2010 novel Blue Sunflower Startle presents the city of Calgary, through the imagination of an immigrant woman, as a lover who is actively seeking the protagonist.

== Works ==
- Lion's granddaughter and other stories. Edmonton: NeWest Press, 1992.
- Bridal Hands on the Maple. Calgary: Second Wednesday Press, 1992.
- Women dancing on rooftops: bring your belly close by. Toronto: TSAR, 1997.
- Blue sunflower startle: a novel. Calgary: Freehand Books, 2010.
- (with Sukita). Country Drive. India: Red River Press, 2017. Illustrated by Anandana Kapur.
