= CTV Drama Channel =

Television drama channel based in Canada

- Country: Canada
- Broadcast area: Nationwide
- Headquarters: 299 Queen Street West, Toronto, Ontario

Programming
- Language: English
- Picture format: 1080i HDTV (downscaled to letterboxed 480i for the SDTV feed)

Ownership
- Owner: Bell Media (Branding licensed from NBCUniversal / Comcast as Bravo!, and Bravo from 1995 to 2019)
- Sister channels: CTV; CTV 2 CTV Comedy Channel; CTV Sci-Fi Channel; CTV Life Channel; CTV News Channel; CTV Nature Channel; CTV Speed Channel; CTV Wild Channel

History
- Launched: January 1, 1995; 31 years ago
- Former names: Bravo! (1995–2012); Bravo (2012–2019)

Links
- Website: www.ctv.ca/drama

CTV Drama Channel is a Canadian English language discretionary specialty channel owned by Bell Media. The channel primarily broadcasts drama series and films.

The channel was founded as the original Canadian version of the American channel Bravo (which is now owned by NBCUniversal) on January 1, 1995 by Moses Znaimer and its owner CHUM Limited, and originally focused on performing arts, drama, and independent film, while also sourcing most of its programming from its original American counterpart. After the acquisition of CHUM by CTVglobemedia, the channel pivoted away from arts programming, and segued to a general entertainment format with a focus on drama (unlike its American counterpart, which has largely shifted to reality television programming targeting a female audience).

== History ==
In the 1980s, a precursor to Bravo existed called C Channel. The service was boasted as a national commercial-free pay television channel that focused on arts programming. C Channel launched on February 1, 1983, before it went bankrupt and ceased operations five months later on June 30 of that year due to its inability to attract a sufficient number of subscribers at a price of $16 per month.

Bravo logo used from 1995 to 2012

Over 10 years later, another attempt at an arts-based channel was proposed when CHUM Limited applied to the Canadian Radio-television and Telecommunications Commission (CRTC) for a license to operate Bravo. In June 1994, CHUM's application for Bravo was approved, citing its nature of service as focusing on "performance and drama programming, as well as documentary and discussion". The channel's name was finalized to "Bravo!" to avoid any copyright infringement with Rainbow Media.

Bravo! was launched on January 1, 1995, licensing the name from Rainbow Media, who partnered with CHUM to launch MuchMusic USA (later known as Fuse TV). The network was launched at midnight (12:00 AM) with an introductory slide of a letter from Moses Znaimer explaining how Bravo! was intended to help show that TV was not "a monumental waste of time", as he claimed most people thought of it, followed by their first program, the BBC documentary TV Is King. After TV is King, the second program aired on the network was an episode of the NBC series Night Gallery. It focused on arts programming, including music, ballet, literature, television and film drama, visual arts, modern dance, opera and architecture. Facilities for the network, including a small studio constructed especially for acoustic performances, were housed in an addition to the CHUMCity Building at 299 Queen Street West in Toronto, and much like Citytv and MuchMusic, utilized unconventional branding and programming (hence the original slogan for the network, NewStyleArtsChannel), and the network had 3 branded vehicles to be used in covering news about the arts. Canadian actress and artist Marilyn Lightstone, longtime partner of Moses Znaimer, served as the channel's primary voiceover throughout the CHUM era. As a condition of licence, Bravo! was to contribute a predetermined amount or percentage of its revenues to ArtsFACT (now called Bravo!FACT), a fund established to provide grants for the production of Canadian short films covering a wide range of arts-related disciplines. Films funded by Bravo!FACT have regularly aired on the channel. To coincide with the channel's launch, the "Bravo!" wordmark was built above what was eventually CP24's studios.

=== Sale to CTVglobemedia/Bell Media ===
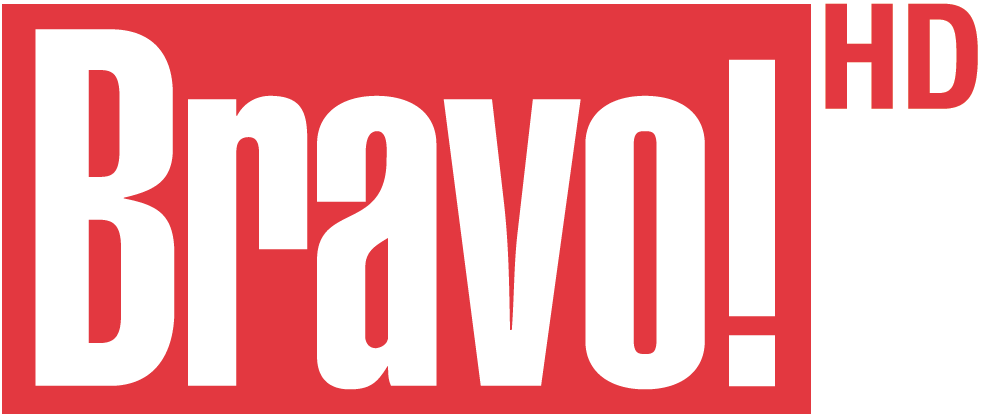
Bravo HD logo used from 2011 to 2012.

In July 2006, Bell Globemedia (later called CTVglobemedia) announced that it would purchase CHUM for an estimated CAD$1.7 billion, included in the sale was Bravo! The sale was approved by the CRTC on June 8, 2007, and the transaction was completed on June 22, 2007 while the Citytv stations were sold to Rogers Media. After CTVglobemedia's purchase of CHUM and Bravo!, the channel increasingly shifted its focus toward more television and film dramas (such as Criminal Minds), and lessened its focus on arts programming.

On September 10, 2010, BCE Inc. (a minority shareholder in CTVglobemedia) announced that it planned to acquire 100% interest in CTVglobemedia for a total debt and equity transaction cost of $3.2 billion. The deal was approved by the CRTC on March 7, 2011, and was finalized on April 1 of that year, on which CTVglobemedia was rebranded Bell Media. A high definition simulcast feed of Bravo!, which broadcasts in the 1080i resolution format, was launched later that year on October 6, 2011.

Bravo's final on air logo, used from 2012 to 2019.

While under Bell Media ownership, the shift toward television and film dramas and general entertainment programming was expanded upon, although it still carried some arts-related programming as a condition of its license. Bravo! unveiled a new on-air logo and new on-air presentation on May 14, 2012 as part of an extensive network rebranding. The channel was renamed from Bravo! to Bravo, and used the same name without the exclamation point. The rebrand also coincided with the removal of the original "square" logo that the channel had maintained since its launch (which resembled the 1993 to 2005 logo used by the U.S. channel), in favour of a design no longer resembling any logo used by its original American counterpart.

On June 6, 2013, Bell announced that Bravo would become the company's first network to implement a TV Everywhere service, which would allow subscribers of participating television service providers that carry Bravo to stream video on demand content as well as a live feed of the Bravo channel via the Bravo Go app.

Bravo adjusted its programming strategy in 2017, aiming to build upon the premiere of The Handmaid's Tale by adding more series that were "smart but bold", and series that appeal to women without "alienating" male audiences.

On June 7, 2018, it was announced that Bravo would be re-branded as "CTV Drama", as part of a re-branding of several Bell Media specialty channels under the CTV name. The following year, it was revealed the channel would rebrand as CTV Drama Channel on September 12, 2019. Bell also announced a commitment to order 20 made-for-TV film adaptations of Harlequin novels from Harlequin Studios, which would air on CTV Drama Channel and Vrak.

In June 2024, Rogers announced a licensing agreement with Comcast subsidiary NBCUniversal to relaunch the Bravo brand in Canada in September of that year. On August 28, 2024, Rogers confirmed that OLN would relaunch as Bravo on September 1.

== Programming ==
In its early years as Bravo, the channel often aired short films by Canadian artists between programs, funded by its foundation Bravo!FACT, which ranged from comedy to drama to opera to jazz to animation. Many of these also aired on Bravo's weekly series Bravo!FACT Presents. Bravo has also produced a limited amount of scripted and non-scripted series and has aired various notable specials, including a telecast of Canadian rock band Spirit of the West's Open Heart Symphony concert with the Vancouver Symphony Orchestra, along with three early telefilms within the Murdoch Mysteries franchise: Except the Dying, Poor Tom Is Cold and Under the Dragon's Tail.

Since the retirement of CRTC's genre protection rules in 2015 outside of news and sports, CTV Drama Channel, by that point, currently airs a mix of programming from U.S. cable and broadcast networks, as well as repeats of Canadian-produced shows to fulfill Canadian content quotas.

=== As CTV Drama Channel ===
This is a list of programs currently being broadcast regularly and irregularly, as of September 2025.

==== Current programming ====
- 9-1-1
- 9-1-1: Lone Star
- Chicago Fire
- Chicago Med
- Chicago P.D.
- Doctor Odyssey
- Flashpoint
- Forensic Factor
- The Handmaid's Tale
- Fear Thy Neighbor
- The Rookie

=== As Bravo (past) ===
- Arts & Minds
- At the Concert Hall
- Bravo! Videos
- Bravo!FACT Presents
- Bravo!NEWS
- Except the Dying
- Law & Order
- Live at the Rehearsal Hall
- 19-2
- Open Heart Symphony
- The O'Regan Files
- Playlist
- The People's Couch
- Poor Tom Is Cold
- Pretty Little Liars
- Spoken Art
- Star Portraits
- Under the Dragon's Tail
