= List of awards and nominations received by Murdoch Mysteries =

Murdoch Mysteries awards and nominations
Awards and nominations
Award	Wins	Nominations

Totals (Note: Certain award groups do not simply award one winner. They acknowledge several different recipients, have runners-up, and have third place. Since this is a specific recognition and is different from losing an award, runner-up mentions are considered wins in this award tally. For simplification and to avoid errors, each award in this list has been presumed to have had a prior nomination.)
- Wins: 13
- Nominations: 70

Murdoch Mysteries is a Canadian television drama series aired on both City and CBC Television, featuring Yannick Bisson as William Murdoch, a police detective working in Toronto, Ontario, around the turn of the twentieth century

== Total nominations and awards for the cast ==
Actor	Nominations	Awards
Yannick Bisson	3	2
Hélène Joy	3	0
Jonny Harris	3	0
Thomas Craig	2	0
Mouna Traoré	1	0
Nigel Bennett	1	0

== ACTRA Toronto Awards ==
Year	Category	Nominee	Result	Reference
2016	Outstanding Performance – Male	Nigel Bennett (episode: "What Lies Buried")	Nominated	
2017	Outstanding Performance - Series Ensemble	Yannick Bisson, Helene Joy, Jonny Harris, Thomas Craig, Mouna Traoré	Nominated	

== Canadian Cinema Editors Awards ==
Year	Category	Nominee	Result	Reference
2011	Best Editing in Long Form Television Series	Don Cassidy (episode: "Me, Myself and Murdoch")	Nominated	
2012	Best Editing in Long Form Television Series	Vesna Svilanovic (episode: "Murdoch in Wonderland")	Nominated	

== Canadian Screen Awards ==
Year	Category	Nominee	Result	Reference
2013	Cross-Platform Project, Fiction	Shane Kinnear, Jay Bennett, Daniel Dales, Christina Jennings, Jarrett Sherman (Murdoch Mysteries: The Curse of the Lost Pharaohs)	Nominated	
2013	Best Achievement in Make-Up	Debi Drennan (episode: "Murdoch in Wonderland")	Nominated	
2013	Best Direction in a Dramatic Series	Laurie Lynd (episode: "Dead End Street")	Nominated	
2014	Best Performance by an Actress in a Continuing Leading Dramatic Role	Hélène Joy	Nominated	
2014	Best Achievement in Make‐Up	Deb Drennan (episode: "Victoria Cross")	Nominated	
2014	Best Cross‐Platform Project, Fiction	Allen Martin, Christina Jennings, Diang Iu, Fergus Heywood, Jay Bennett, Mike Evans, Sarah Adams, Scott Garvie (Murdoch Mysteries: Nightmare on Queen St)	Nominated	
2015	Best Achievement in Make-Up	Deb Drennan (episode: "Friday the 13th, 1901")	Won	
2015	Best Costume Design	Alexander Reda (episode: "Murdoch in Ragtime")	Won	
2015	Best Original Music Score for a Series	Robert Carli (episode: "Murdoch Ahoy")	Nominated	
2015	Best Visual Effects	Robert Crowther, Tony Cybulski, Steve Elliott, Mark Fordham, Min Young Kim, Jason Stalker, Jay Stanners, Liana van Rensburg, Allan Walker, Lexi Young (episode: "Murdoch Ahoy")	Nominated	
2016	Best Original Music Score for a Series	Robert Carli (episode: "On the Waterfront: Part One")	Nominated	
2016	Fan's Choice Award	Yannick Bisson	Won	
2017	Best Performance by an Actress in a Leading Role in a Dramatic Program or Limited Series	Hélène Joy (A Merry Murdoch Christmas)	Nominated	
2017	Best Direction in a Dramatic Program or Limited Series	Michael McGowan (A Merry Murdoch Christmas)	Won	
2017	Best Achievement in Make-Up	Deb Drennan, Shirley Bond (episode: "Summer of '75")	Nominated	
2017	Best Costume Design	Alexander Reda (episode: "Unlucky in Love")	Nominated	
2017	Best Original Music Score for a Program	Robert Carli (episode: "A Merry Murdoch Christmas")	Won	
2017	Best Performance in a Guest Role Dramatic Series	William Shatner	Nominated	
2017	Best Production Design or Art Direction in a Fiction Program or Series	Armando Sgrignuoli, Kent McIntyre (episode: "24 Hours til Doomsday")	Nominated	
2017	Best TV Movie or Limited Series	Christina Jennings, Scott Garvie, Peter Mitchell, Yannick Bisson, Julie Lacey, Stephen Montgomery (A Merry Murdoch Christmas)	Won	
2017	Best Writing in a Dramatic Program or Limited Series	Peter Mitchell (A Merry Murdoch Christmas)	Won	

== Directors Guild of Canada Awards ==
Year	Category	Nominee	Result	Reference
2010	Outstanding Achievement in Sound Editing - Television Series	Mark Beck, Jonas Kuhnemann, Richard Calistan, Joseph Doane (episode: "Werewolves")	Won	
2010	Outstanding Achievement in Production Design - Television Series	Aidan Leroux (episode: "The Great Wall")	Nominated	
2015	Production Design - Television Series	Armando Sgrignuoli (episode: M"urdoch and the Temple of Death")	Nominated	
2015	Best Sound Editing - Television Series	Mark Beck, Jonas Kuhnemann, Richard Calistan, Joseph Doane (episode: "Murdoch and the Temple of Death")	Nominated	
2016	Best Sound Editing - Television Movie/Mini-Series	Mark Beck, Jonas Kuhnemann, Richard Calistan, Joseph Doane (A Merry Murdoch Christmas)	Nominated	
2017	Best Sound Editing - Television Movie/Mini-Series	Mark Beck, Richard Calistan, Joseph Doane, Jonas Kuhnemann (Once Upon a Murdoch Christmas)	Nominated	

== Gemini Awards ==
Year	Category	Nominee	Result	Reference
2008	Best Dramatic Series	Christina Jennings, Cal Coons, Scott Garvie, Noel Hedges, Jan Peter Meyboom	Nominated	
2008	Best Performance by an Actor in a Featured Supporting Role in a Dramatic Series	Thomas Craig	Nominated	
2008	Best Performance by an Actor in a Featured Supporting Role in a Dramatic Series	Jonny Harris	Nominated	
2008	Best Performance by an Actor in a Guest Role, Dramatic Series	Dmitry Chepovetsky (episode: "Power")	Nominated	
2008	Best Performance by an Actor in a Guest Role, Dramatic Series	Gavin Crawford (episode: "Belly Speaker")	Won	
2008	Best Performance by an Actor in a Guest Role, Dramatic Series	Stephen McHattie (episode: "Let Loose the Dogs")	Nominated	
2008	Best Performance by an Actor in a Guest Role, Dramatic Series	Vincent Walsh (episode: "The Rebel and the Prince")	Nominated	
2008	Best Performance by an Actress in a Guest Role, Dramatic Series	Kate Trotter (episode: "Body Double")	Nominated	
2008	Best Original Music Score for a Program or Series	Robert Carli (episode: "Bad Medicine")	Won	
2008	Best Achievement in Make-Up	Debi Drennan (episode: "The Rebel and the Prince")	Nominated	
2008	Best Photography in a Dramatic Program or Series	David Perrault (episode: "Annoying Red Planet")	Nominated	
2008	Best Visual Effects	Thomas Turnbull, Robert Crowther, Ian Britton, Hojin Park, Megumi Kanazawa, Andrew Nguyen, David Lamb, Matthew Hansen (episode: "Power")	Nominated	
2008	Best Achievement in Casting	Deirdre Bowen	Nominated	
2008	Best Writing in a Dramatic Series	Janet MacLean (episode: "Til Death Do Us Part")	Nominated	
2009	Best Achievement in Main Title Design	Shane Kinnear, Kevin Chandoo, Brent Whitmore	Nominated	
2009	Best Achievement in Make Up	Debi Drennan, Regan Noble (episode: "The Green Muse")	Nominated	
2009	Best Original Music Score for a Program or Series	Robert Carli (episode: "Werewolves")	Won	
2009	Best Photography in a Dramatic Program or Series	Jim Jeffrey (episode: "Werewolves")	Nominated	
2009	Best Writing in a Dramatic Series	Lori Spring (episode: "I, Murdoch")	Nominated	
2009	Best Performance by an Actor in a Featured Supporting Role in a Dramatic Series	Jonny Harris	Nominated	
2010	Best Writing in a Dramatic Series	Larry Lalonde, Philip Bedard (episode: "Hangman")	Nominated	
2010	Best Performance by an Actress in a Guest Role, Dramatic Series	Anastasia Phillips (episode: "Me, Myself, & Murdoch")	Nominated	
2010	Best Photography in a Dramatic Program or Series	James Jeffrey (episode: "The Murdoch Identity")	Nominated	
2010	Best Original Music Score for a Program or Series	Robert Carli (episode: "Me, Myself, & Murdoch")	Nominated	

== International Digital Emmy Awards ==
Year	Category	Nominee	Result	Reference
2012	Digital Program: Fiction	Smokebomb Entertainment/Shaftesbury Films/Citytv Canada (Murdoch Mysteries: The Curse of the Lost Pharaohs)	Nominated	

== Writers Guild of Canada Screenwriting Awards ==
Year	Category	Nominee	Result	Reference
2010	Episodic One Hour	Derek Schreyer (episode: "Mild Mild West")	Nominated	
2012	Drama Series	Graham Clegg (episode: "Kommando")	Nominated	
2012	Shorts and Web Series	Patrick Tarr (episodes; "The Curse of the Lost Pharaohs" and "The Vanished Corpse")	Won	
2020	Drama Series	Simon McNabb (episode "Sins of the Father")	Nominated	

== Prix Aurora Awards ==
Year	Category	Nominee	Result	Reference
2017	Best Visual Presentation	Peter Mitchell and Christina Jennings	Nominated	

== Young Artist Awards ==
Year	Category	Nominee	Result	Reference
2009	Best Performance in a TV Series - Guest Starring Young Actor	Jesse Bostick	Nominated	
2014	Best Performance in a TV Series - Guest Starring Young Actress 10 and Under	Arcadia Kendal	Nominated	
2014	Best Performance in a TV Series - Guest Starring Young Actor 10 and Under	Christian Distefano	Won	
2016	Best Performance in a TV Series - Guest Starring Young Actress 11-13	Zoe Fraser	Nominated	
2016	Best Performance in a TV Movie, Miniseries or Special - Leading Young Actress	Peyton Kennedy	Nominated	
