= Under the Dragon's Tail =

- Based on: Under the Dragon's Tail by Maureen Jennings
- Written by: Janet MacLean
- Directed by: John L'Ecuyer
- Starring: Peter Outerbridge; Hélène Joy; Flora Montgomery; Matthew MacFadzean; Philip Graeme
- Country of origin: Canada
- Original language: English

Production
- Producers: Scott Garvie; Laura Harbin; Christina Jennings; Virginia Rankin; Patrick Cassavetti
- Production companies: Shaftesbury Films & Original Pictures

Original release
- Release: September 8, 2005

Under the Dragon's Tail is a 2005 made-for-TV film starring Peter Outerbridge, Matthew MacFadzean, Hélène Joy, and Flora Montgomery. It was adapted by Janet MacLean from the novel by Maureen Jennings of the same name.

== Plot ==
This is the third of three telemovies (the previous two being Except the Dying and Poor Tom Is Cold) depicting the character of William Murdoch and his unique ways of doing detective work. Filming took place in Ontario during September and October 2004.

Detective Murdoch investigates the murder of Dolly Capshaw, a midwife who provides abortion care. Using new techniques such as fingerprints (or finger marks as they are known in the Murdoch milieu) and handwriting analysis, Murdoch eliminates a number of suspects but has proof that a self-righteous and nosy neighbor, Mr. Golding, was in the house. Missing from Capshaw's desk is her register of clients, a large red book with the image of a dragon on the cover.

Murdoch's investigation involves many people whose lives had, in one way or another, crossed with Capshaw's including Ettie Weston, who is no longer a prostitute but is now on the stage with a mentalist act; and Maude Pedlow, the wife of a prominent Superior Court judge. Meanwhile, Constable George Crabtree is in training for the Toronto police boxing tournament under the tutelage of Inspector Ramsgate.

In this film, Maude Pedlow is played by Hélène Joy, who went on to portray Dr Julia Ogden in the later TV series Murdoch Mysteries starring Yannick Bisson.

== Cast ==
- Peter Outerbridge as Detective William Murdoch
- Hélène Joy as Maud Pedlow
- Flora Montgomery as Ettie Weston
- Matthew MacFadzean as Constable George Crabtree

== DVDs ==
All three films were released on DVD in a boxed set on November 11, 2008.

On March 3, 2015, Acorn Media announced a re-release for all three films in May the same year.
