= Except the Dying (novel) =

1997 detective novel by Maureen Jennings

Except The Dying
- Author: Maureen Jennings
- Language: English
- Series: Murdoch Mysteries
- Genre: Crime novel
- Publisher: Thomas Dunne Books, St. Martin's Press
- Publication date: 1997
- Publication place: Canada
- Media type: Print
- Pages: 345
- ISBN: 978-0-312-16829-2
- OCLC: 36817211
- Followed by: Under The Dragon's Tail
- Website: www.maureenjennings.com

Except The Dying is the first detective novel by Canadian writer Maureen Jennings featuring the detective William Murdoch in the series The Murdoch Mysteries. It was first published in Canada by Thomas Dunne Books, an imprint of St. Martin's Press, in 1997.

== Plot summary ==
In the first chapter, William Murdoch is introduced, as a man of strong principles, who uses his unique abilities to solve crimes, sometimes using advanced science for his time.

On the street of Toronto, in 1895, the body of a prostitute is found, murdered in a back alley. Inspector Brackenreid decides that this is an accidental death, but Murdoch feels there's more to the situation at hand.

As Murdoch digs deeper into the prostitute's death, he discovers that there is something more sinister going and that the young girl was actually a housemaid for a very rich and prominent family in Toronto.

Her autopsy reveals she was pregnant and had opium in her system, which makes Murdoch even more suspicious of her death. With the help of Constable George Crabtree, Murdoch solves the crime and brings justice for a young girl's wrongful death.

== Film and TV adaptations ==
The novel was adapted into a 2004 television film of the same name starring Peter Outerbridge as Detective Murdoch. In 2008, Murdoch Mysteries was made into an ongoing television series starring Yannick Bisson, Helene Joy, Jonny Harris, Thomas Craig and Georgina Reilly.
