= John Wilson Murray =

- Born: June 25, 1840; Edinburgh, Scotland
- Died: June 12, 1906 (aged 65); Toronto, Ontario
- Occupation: Provincial detective for Ontario
- Years active: 1875–1906
- Employer: Government of Ontario
- Known for: Chief inspector; pioneering detective work in Ontario
- Spouse(s): (wife, name unknown; predeceased him)
- Children: 2 daughters (Mary Murray; Mrs. William Boyd)
- Parent(s): Daniel Duncan Murray and Jeanette Wilson

John Wilson Murray (25 June 1840 – 12 June 1906) was a Canadian police officer and sailor in the United States Navy.

== Biography ==
Born in Edinburgh, Scotland, he came to North America as a young boy. He joined the United States Navy on 5 June 1857 and became a crew member of the USS Michigan. This ship operated out of Erie, Pennsylvania, and carried out patrols on the Great Lakes as well as supervising the prison camp for Confederate officers at Johnson's Island on Lake Erie.

As the source for Murray's early life is his own writings, little reliance should be given them for details of his own participation in events aboard the Michigan. It is confirmed that he was an acting gunner on the ship in 1864. In that year, two attempts were made to capture the ship and free the Confederate officers at Johnson's Island.

Murray left the navy on 31 January 1866 with an honourable discharge and 1868 became a detective with the Erie police force and, in 1873, joined the Canada Southern Railway as a detective.

In 1875, after Murray became Ontario's first full-time criminal detective with the title Detective for the Government of Ontario. He held the position until his death and solved hundreds of crimes including the murder of Cornwallis Benwell at the hands of J.W. Birchall of Oxford County, Ontario. Murray was later joined by two additional detectives, and each were named inspector, with Murray as chief inspector, in 1897, marking the beginnings of the Criminal Investigation Branch of what would later become the Ontario Provincial Police.

Murray died at home on 12 July 1906, from the effects of a stroke he suffered three days earlier.

== "Million Dollar Counterfeiting" case ==
Murray's first case was to investigate the forgery of Canadian bank notes. The forgeries were identified by an expert at the US Treasury Department in Washington when he noticed the bills were suspiciously beautiful. Murray consulted with former counterfeiters; they were impressed by the forgeries, which they declared could only be the work of master engraver Edwin Johnson, the "king of counterfeiting". In 1880, five years after the first forged bill was found, Johnson was arrested for using a fake bill to buy a necktie. He had printed one million dollars' worth of counterfeit bills using 21 exceptionally engraved copper plates.

== Legacy ==
In 1904, Murray published an account of his most memorable cases in the Memoirs of a Great Detective. His exploits inspired the CBC series The Great Detective as well as the creation of Detective William Murdoch by Canadian writer Maureen Jennings and the popular television series Murdoch Mysteries, inspired by her novels.
