= Poor Tom Is Cold =

- Based on: Poor Tom Is Cold by Maureen Jennings
- Written by: Janet MacLean
- Directed by: Michael DeCarlo
- Starring: Peter Outerbridge; Colm Meaney; Keeley Hawes; Flora Montgomery
- Country of origin: Canada
- Original language: English

Production
- Producers: Scott Garvie; Laura Harbin; Christina Jennings; Virginia Rankin
- Production companies: Shaftesbury Films & Original Pictures

Original release
- Release: September 12, 2004

Related
- Except the Dying; Under the Dragon's Tail

Poor Tom Is Cold is a 2004 made-for-TV film starring Peter Outerbridge, Colm Meaney, Keeley Hawes, and Flora Montgomery. The second film to feature the character of William Murdoch and his unique ways of doing detective work, the film is based on the novel by Maureen Jennings of the same name, and was directed by Michael DeCarlo from a screenplay by Janet MacLean.

== Plot ==
Constable Oliver Wicken (Philip Graeme) is found dead in the basement of an abandoned house, shot through the head. While the rest of the police department believes he committed suicide, William Murdoch (Peter Outerbridge) thinks otherwise and sets out to prove that his friend and protégé was murdered.

While investigating Wicken's death, Murdoch comes across some interesting facts the late constable had kept hidden. He discovers that Wicken was secretly engaged and had been working closely with a mysterious blonde woman before his death.

Murdoch uses new but unproven technique called "fingerprinting", to get fingerprints off the gun. With the help of Dr. Odgen, Murdoch proves that Wicken was actually murdered and catches the killer.

== Cast ==
- Peter Outerbridge as Detective William Murdoch
- Colm Meaney as Inspector Brackenreid
- Keeley Hawes as Dr. Julia Ogden
- Flora Montgomery as Ettie Weston
- Philip Graeme as Constable Oliver Wickham
- Matthew MacFadzean as Constable George Crabtree
- Chang Tseng as Sam Lee

== DVDs ==
All three Murdoch films were released on DVD in a boxed set on November 11, 2008.

On March 3, 2015, Acorn Media announced a re-release for all three films, set for May 26, 2015.
