= Desolation Sound (film) =

- Poster
- Directed by: Scott Weber
- Screenplay by: Glynis Davies
- Produced by: Ehud Bleiberg; Yitzhak Ginsberg; Miriam Leffert; Brittany Taylor
- Starring: Hélène Joy; Jennifer Beals; Ed Begley Jr. Lothaire Bluteau; Ian Tracey
- Cinematography: Randal Platt
- Edited by: Roger Mattiussi
- Music by: Mary Anne Waterhouse
- Release date: November 4, 2005
- Running time: 101 minutes
- Country: Canada
- Language: English

Desolation Sound is a 2005 Canadian drama film directed by Scott Weber and starring Hélène Joy, Jennifer Beals, Ed Begley Jr., Lothaire Bluteau and Ian Tracey.

== Plot ==
Laura Elliott's quiet life in the wilderness of Desolation Sound is shattered when her old friend, Elizabeth, comes to visit. Laura learns that her husband has been having an affair with Elizabeth, and soon after, Elizabeth's car is found at the bottom of a cliff. As the police investigate, life changes for everyone involved.

== Cast ==
- Hélène Joy as Laurel Elliott
- Jennifer Beals as Elizabeth Storey
- Ian Tracey as Michael Elliott
- Lothaire Bluteau as Benny
- Ed Begley Jr. as Doug Shepard
- Emily Hirst as Margaret Elliott
- Haili Page as Nicole Shepard
- Susan Bain as Nurse Rachel
- Layne Black as Officer Wright

== Reception ==
Liam Lacey of The Globe and Mail awarded the film one and half stars.
