= InSecurity =

- Genre: Comedy drama
- Created by: Kevin White; Robert de Lint; Virginia Thompson
- Written by: Kevin White
- Directed by: Robert de Lint; Ron Murphy; Jeff Beesley
- Starring: Natalie Lisinska; William deVry; Rémy Girard; Matthew MacFadzean; Grace Lynn Kung; Richard Yearwood; Ali Kazmi
- Theme music composer: The Asteroids Galaxy Tour
- Opening theme: The Sun Ain't Shining No More
- Country of origin: Canada
- Original language: English
- No. of seasons: 2
- No. of episodes: 23 (and 1 pilot)

Production
- Producers: Kevin White; Virginia Thompson; Robert de Lint
- Production locations: Regina, Saskatchewan, Canada
- Running time: 22 minutes
- Production companies: Vérité Films Inc. Company Name Here Productions Inc.

Original release
- Network: CBC
- Release: January 4 – December 12, 2011

InSecurity is a Canadian spy comedy television series that aired on CBC Television from 2011 to 2012. The series centres on a team of covert operatives working for the National Intelligence and Security Agency (NISA), a fictional Canadian intelligence service. The series is set in Ottawa but filmed primarily in Regina, Saskatchewan. The initial season of 13 episodes premiered January 4, 2011. It was followed by a second season of 10 episodes before cancellation by CBC on April 19, 2012 due to budget cuts from the 2012 Canadian federal budget.

One of the producers called it "the 24 of Canada"; one writer described it as "24 without Jack Bauer; CSI minus the science; and James Bond - if James Bond were Mr. Bean."

The initial pilot focused on the tedium involved in electronic eavesdropping but the decision was made that it would be too "niche". A second pilot was done with a more 24 approach.

== Overview ==
The series revolves around a team of incompetent spy-catchers who work for the Canadian National Intelligence and Security Agency (NISA), a fictional intelligence gathering agency.

- Natalie Lisinska as Alex Cranston, the leader of the team
- William deVry as Peter McNeil, the director of NISA.
- Richard Yearwood as Benjamin N’udu, a loyal and slightly deranged former agent of the fictional Ligerian Secret Service.
- Rémy Girard as Claude Lesage, a veteran French Canadian NISA agent.
- Matthew MacFadzean as Burt Wilson, an incompetent NISA agent that's always getting himself and others into trouble.
- Grace Lynn Kung as Jojo Kwan, a brilliant scientist and NISA agent.
- Ali Kazmi as Nigel

== Episodes ==
=== Pilot (2010) ===
| Title | Directed by | Written by | Original release date |
|---|---|---|---|
| "B Team" | Robert De Lint | Kevin White | April 27, 2010 |
Alex Taylor, a team leader at the Canadian Intelligence and Security Establishment, is tasked to spy on an unemployed shoe salesman who is potentially a Chechen operative. Lesage anonymously gives the Chechen a model train starter kit to enliven his dull life. When Alex sees the surveillance video she believes that the friends who are visiting are using the model train as a cover for a bigger terrorist conspiracy until she gets the translation of video which confirms they are 'nerds playing with trains'. A moment later Burt mistakes modelling clay for C-4 explosives. The A team, led by Alex's ex-boyfriend Peter, are tasked to take down the Chechen and his friends. After Lesage informs Alex that it is not explosives and says that Nathan, the new kid on the team, gave the Chechen the train set Alex confesses to everyone that there are no explosives and it was all a mistake.

=== Season 1 (2011) ===
| No. | Title | Directed by | Written by | Original release date | CAN. viewers (millions) |
|---|---|---|---|---|---|
| 1 | "The Doctor" | Robert DeLint | Jennifer Whalen | January 4, 2011 | 0.724 |
Alex Cranston, a team leader at the National Intelligence and Security Agency, is held captive by uranium smugglers. When NISA agents notice her missing, they attempt to rescue her relatively unharmed, while an interrogation specialist — her old high-school classmate Randy Nussbaum — extracts valuable information.
| 2 | "Keeping Up With The Laslovs" | Jeff Beesley | Kevin White & Jennifer Whalen | January 11, 2011 | 0.526 |
Thinking that they are their new neighbors, a Russian couple in possession of stolen Canadian submarine plans unwittingly invite Alex and Peter, who are tasked with retrieving the plans, into their home for vodka. While keeping tabs on the situation, the other team members are caught by uninvited Russian guests.
| 3 | "View To A Nursing Home" | Robert DeLint | Jennifer Whalen | January 18, 2011 | 0.356 |
After an attempted bombing of the National Arts Council by a right-wing terrorist group known as the "Ottawa Eight", the team runs surveillance on the terrorists responsible from the ideal location — the nursing-home room inhabited by Alex's grouchy grandmother.
| 4 | "The Ligerian Candidate" | Robert DeLint | Kevin White & Dylan Wertz | January 25, 2011 | 0.523 |
Due to post-hypnotic suggestion, N'udu is sent to kill his old friend Masud, a former Ligerian Secret Service agent, and the very man that NISA is protecting at a familiar safehouse.
| 5 | "Recycle After Reading" | Ron Murphy | Marvin Kaye & Chris Sheasgreen | February 1, 2011 | 0.463 |
After a booze-filled night out with Alex, Peter discovers the Jericho file no longer in his possession. As these documents contain crucial information on all NISA undercover agents, the team is tasked to recover them before they can be made into a young schoolgirl's art project.
| 6 | "Return of the Deadeye" | Ron Murphy | Max B. Reid & Adam M. Reid | February 8, 2011 | 0.449 |
Tasked with assassinating a Spanish assassin, the team becomes desperate as their various plans fail to work. Upset that he wasn't included, Claude goes rogue.
| 7 | "Spies on Ice" | Robert DeLint | Story by : Max B. Reid, Adam M. Reid & Kevin White; Teleplay by : Kevin White | February 15, 2011 | 0.485 |
Burt retrieves nuclear secrets from the car of Dr. Ho Lung, a North Korean spy attending his son's hockey try out. Alex and Peter pose as the parents of Peter's son in order to buy Burt time.
| 8 | "The Kwan Identity" | Ron Murphy | Kevin White & Dylan Wertz | February 22, 2011 | 0.356 |
JoJo goes undercover as the girlfriend of a Chinese drug dealer who is supplying a neo-Irish Republican Army group with explosives to blow up Queen Elizabeth II. When Alex backs her car into JoJo, she begins to believe that she is Vivian, her undercover alias. The team needs JoJo to continue her work, but Vivian is less than agreeable.
| 9 | "El Negotiator" | Robert DeLint | Kevin White & Tim Polley | March 1, 2011 | 0.336 |
Alex's night off is interrupted when the party she and the team are attending is taken hostage by Mexican terrorists who demand that Canada's government release a member of the group. While Peter makes unsatisfactory attempts at hostage negotiation, N'udu is shot, and the NISA agents are discovered.
| 10 | "The Ghost" | Jeff Beesley | Marvin Kaye & Chris Sheasgreen | March 8, 2011 | 0.294 |
Claude's old friend, Joshua "The Ghost" Crane, a known master of evasion who left NISA eight years ago, is captured with a USB drive that implicates him as being connected to Somali terrorists. However, while the team learns that the group's leaders' names are actually Arabic translations of popular Middle Eastern dishes, he proves the flaws in NISA's security.
| 11 | "Going Dutch" | Ron Murphy | Kevin White & Dylan Wertz | March 15, 2011 | 0.409 |
Alex fears that the Dutch Secret Service has reprogrammed Burt, whom the team must exchange for a captured Dutch spy, to serve as a mole against Canada.
| 12 | "Get Cranston" | Robert DeLint | Rebecca Addelman & Jennifer Whalen | March 22, 2011 | 0.321 |
When a crazed killer targets Alex, NISA must sift through hundreds of suspects but fails to catch the would-be assassin — a university classmate, Penny Cryer, whose nose Alex had broken while playing volleyball.
| 13 | "Death By Birthday" | Robert DeLint | Kevin White | March 29, 2011 | 0.362 |
Alex's birthday takes a turn for the worse when someone sends her a card containing highly concentrated anthrax powder, which is set to kill the entire team (with the exception of Burt) inside of four hours.

=== Season 2 (2011) ===
| No. | Title | Directed by | Written by | Original release date | CAN. viewers (millions) |
|---|---|---|---|---|---|
| 14 | "Agent Oo La La" | Ron Murphy | Mike McPhaden | October 3, 2011 | 0.237 |
Claude learns that his coworkers have been making fun of his fashion when WikiLeaks releases information on NISA. A series of polygraph tests to find the mole worries Burt, as he is dating the test administrator's girlfriend. Alex attempts to calm the nerves of an informant.
| 15 | "The Gift of Life" | Robert DeLint | Kate Hewlett & Kevin White | October 10, 2011 | 0.320 |
Alex dons a disguise to gain the trust of a pregnant suspect. Burt is saddened by a friend's declining health, causing N'udu to offer a kidney.
| 16 | "The Spy Whisperer" | Robert DeLint | Tim Polley & Kevin White | October 17, 2011 | 0.192 |
While under anesthesia, Alex expresses a personal interest in Peter. Meanwhile, after Burt finds a birth certificate for him, N'udu seeks to take advantage of the time he has left.
| 17 | "The Spy Who Fed Me" | Robert DeLint | Jenn Engels & Kevin White | October 24, 2011 | 0.193 |
Alex's mother undermines her authority at NISA. Burt learns about 'stakeout make-out' when he is tasked on a stakeout with JoJo.
| 18 | "Anger Management" | Ron Murphy | Jenn Engels | October 31, 2011 | 0.239 |
The team is on each other's case when Peter doesn't credit Alex for her role in a secret operation, Claude overhears Burt complaining about him to a psychiatrist, and N'udu suspects Jojo of harboring anger.
| 19 | "Spies of a Certain Age" | Robert DeLint | Matt Kippen & Kevin White | November 7, 2011 | N/A |
A visiting tech specialist leads Alex into a night of quickly regretted drunken debauchery. Meanwhile, a slip-up complicates Claude and Burt's rural road-trip.
| 20 | "Spy Bites Dog" | Jeff Beesley | Denis McGrath | November 14, 2011 | 0.258 |
Jojo tries to help Alex overcome her dog problems. Claude resents N'udu over his apparent wealth. Peter feels the need to prove his manliness when he learns that Burt used to wrestle.
| 21 | "Agent Ex" | Robert DeLint | Matt Doyle & Kevin White | November 28, 2011 | 0.213 |
In attempt to gain intel, JoJo dates an ex of Alex, troubling Burt. As JoJo's relationship becomes less than professional, Alex's resurfacing feelings bother JoJo and Peter. Claude feigns interest in N'udu's homeland to gain intel of his own – strategies for beating a video game.
| 22 | "The Spy, the Friend and her Lover" | Jeff Beesley | Tim Polley & Kevin White | December 5, 2011 | 0.226 |
An old college roommate visits Alex, and hooks up with N'udu at Alex's condo. The upcoming wedding of two NISA employees stirs JoJo's feelings toward Burt.
| 23 | "I Spy Peter" | Robert DeLint | Tim Polley | December 12, 2011 | N/A |
JoJo poses as Claude's mail-order bride, Alex investigates Peter under suspicion of unauthorized dealings with a Russian agent, and Burt wastes N'udu's tickets to a soccer game.

== Reception ==
The CBC Television premiere episode was viewed by approximately 724,000 people.

On February 11, 2011, CBC announced that the show was renewed for a second season.

== Awards and nominations ==
| Year | Presenter | Award | Work | Result |
|---|---|---|---|---|
| 2011 | Gemini Awards | Best Performance by an Actress in a Continuing Leading Comedic Role | Grace Lynn Kung | Lost to Tracy Dawson (Call Me Fitz) |

== Home release ==
'InSecurity: The Complete First Season' is on DVD in region 0. It was released on November 8, 2011.
