= In God's Country (film) =

2007 Canadian television film

- Genre: Drama
- Written by: Peter Behrens; Esta Spalding
- Directed by: John L'Ecuyer
- Starring: Kelly Rowan; Richard Burgi; Martha MacIsaac
- Music by: Christopher Dedrick
- Country of origin: Canada
- Original language: English

Production
- Producers: Julie Lacey; Laurie McLarty
- Cinematography: Thomas M. Harting
- Editor: Tom Joerin
- Running time: 86 minutes
- Production company: Shaftesbury Films

Original release
- Network: CTV
- Release: January 23, 2007

In God's Country is a 2007 Canadian drama television film directed by John L'Ecuyer and written by Peter Behrens and Esta Spalding. The film aired on CTV on January 23, 2007. It stars Kelly Rowan as Judith Leavitt, a woman in a polygamous Mormon fundamentalist sect who rebels against the repressive rules of the community in a bid to protect her teenage daughters from being married off to older men against their will.

The cast also includes Richard Burgi, Martha MacIsaac, Hannah Lochner, Peter Outerbridge, Kristopher Turner and Catherine Disher.

== Awards ==
| Award | Date of ceremony | Category | Nominees | Result | Reference |
|---|---|---|---|---|---|
| Gemini Awards | October 28, 2007 | Best TV Movie | Christina Jennings, Scott Garvie, Robert O. Green, Julie Lacey, Graham Ludlow, Laurie McLarty, Kelly Rowan, Paul Stephens | Nominated | |
| Gemini Awards | October 28, 2007 | Best Casting | John Buchan | Nominated | |
| Gemini Awards | October 28, 2007 | Best Photography in a Dramatic Program or Series | Thomas M. Harting | Nominated | |
| Gemini Awards | October 28, 2007 | Best Production Design or Art Direction in a Fiction Program or Series | Taavo Soodor | Nominated | |
| Gemini Awards | October 28, 2007 | Best Sound in a Dramatic Program | Herwig Gayer, Mark Beck, Alan deGraaf, John Gare, Steve Hammond, Jonas Kuhnemann | Nominated | |
| Directors Guild of Canada | 2007 | DGC Team Award, Television Movie or Miniseries | John L'Ecuyer, Mary Pantelidis, Joanne Barrington, Kristine Child, Taavo Soodor, Matt Hunwicks, Hamish Buchanan, David Manion, Sorcha Vasey, Neil Winemaker, Andrew O'Sullivan, Craig McLaren, Tom Joerin, Andrew Coutts, Jonas Kuhnemann, Mark Beck, Richard Calistan | Nominated | |
| Directors Guild of Canada | 2007 | Best Direction in a Television Movie or Miniseries | John L'Ecuyer | Nominated | |
| Directors Guild of Canada | 2007 | Best Production Design in a Television Movie or Miniseries | Taavo Soodor | Nominated | |
| Directors Guild of Canada | 2007 | Best Sound Editing in a Television Movie or Miniseries | Jonas Kuhnemann, Matthew Hussey, Richard Calistan, Mark Beck | Won | |
