= The Eggs =

- Created by: Tony Byrne; Brendan Byrne; Don Arioli
- Directed by: Gillian Carr
- Voices of: Pierre Brault; Kate Hurman; Rick Jones; Hélène Joy; John Koensgen; Nancy Neilson; Mike O'Reilly; Terrence Scammell; Ross Wilson
- Countries of origin: Australia; Canada
- Original language: English
- No. of seasons: 4
- No. of episodes: 52

Production
- Running time: 12 minutes
- Production companies: B&T Entertainment; Funbag Animation Studios

Original release
- Network: Nine Network
- Release: 2004 – 2005

The Eggs is a children's animated television program that broadcast on the Nine Network on 2004 to 2005. There are 52 episodes of a 12-minute duration. Two cartoon episodes were usually screened together in a half hour timeslot. The Eggs was produced by Tony Byrne and Brendan Byrne (not related).

== Series synopsis ==
The Eggs follows the colourful adventures of four anthropomorphic egg college graduates as they continue their mission through the Looneyverse to search out valuable new sounds for their music-loving home planet of Kazoo. On their travels, they visit many unique and strange different planets each with their own music and sounds.

== Characters ==
=== Main ===
- Benedict (voiced by Mike O'Reilly (speaking); John Koensgen (singing)) - Benedict is a level-headed scientist egg who is usually the leader of the group and has his own laboratory aboard Shelly. He wears a blue spacesuit.
- Yolky (voiced by Kate Hurman (speaking); Andrea Lees (singing)) - Yolky is a plucky, feisty female egg who is often made fun of for being slightly smaller than the others. She wears a red spacesuit.
- Scramble (voiced by Terrence Scammell) - Scramble is a cowardly and lazy egg. He wears a green spacesuit.
- Sunnyside (voiced by Hélène Joy) - Sunnyside is a friendly, positive and stylish egg. She wears a purple spacesuit.

=== Recurring ===
- Shelly (voiced by Hélène Joy) - The Eggs' spaceship. She serves as something of a mother figure to them, and interacts with them through a screen attached to a mechanical tube.
- Min (voiced by Kate Hurman)
- Eggor (voiced by Rick Jones) - Benedict's robotic assistant.
- The Worms - Sunnyside's worm-like companions.
  - Eeny (voiced by Terrence Scammell)
  - Meeny (voiced by Rick Jones)
  - Miney (voiced by Mike O'Reilly)
  - Fred (voiced by Terrence Scammell)

== Voice cast ==
=== Main ===
- Mike O'Reilly - Benedict (speaking), Miney
- John Koensgen - Benedict (singing)
- Kate Hurman - Yolky (speaking), Min
- Andrea Lees - Yolky (singing)
- Terrence Scammell - Scramble, Eeny, Fred
- Hélène Joy - Sunnyside, Shelly
- Rick Jones - Eggor, Meeny

=== Additional voices ===
- Pierre Brault
- Kate Hurman
- Rick Jones
- Hélène Joy
- John Koensgen
- Nancy Neilson
- Mike O'Reilly
- Terrence Scammell
- Ross Wilson

== Episode list ==
=== Series 1 (2004) ===
Episode #	In Season	Title	Airdate
1	1	The Beginning	2004
It's Graduation Day. The Eggs are being sent on a mission into the Looneyverse and try to adjust to the new life.			2004
2	2	One at a Time	2004
On their first mission, The Eggs visit the Planet Monotogmous and try to teach the inhabitants how to sing.			2004
3	3	The Worms of Ineptune	2004
Sunnyside befriends four worms and tries to sneak them on the ship.			2004
4	4	Planet Jollywood	2004
The Eggs try to help a king be funny, while dealing with Shelly's bad attitude.			2004
5	5	A Lullaby for Shelly	2004
The Eggs try to help an insomniac Shelly go to sleep.			2004
6	6	The Dangerous Driver	2004
Benedict and Sunnyside track down a trash-dumping criminal, damage to Min causes Shelly to go haywire, and Scramble tries to satisfy himself.			2004
7	7	Where's Shelly?	2004
Min causes Shelly to go haywire.			2004
8	8	There's Shelly	2004
The Eggs try to rescue Shelly from being crushed at a junkyard.			2004
9	9	Choog	2004
Scramble tries to be brave when alien inhabitants want to eat the Eggs.			2004
10	10	A Hairy Adventure	2004
Benedict, Scramble and Sunnyside get muddy, which causes them to grow hair.			2004
11	11	A Hair Raising Tale	2004
Benedict's hair gel helps people with their long hair.			2004
12	12	The Ogre's Nose	2004
The Eggs try to deal with Oogy after he steals music.			2004
13	13	Yolky Saves the Day	2004
After making too many mistakes, the Eggs tell Yolky not to do anything important for a week, but she realizes that her friends may be in danger.			2004

=== Series 2 (2004) ===
Episode #	In Season	Title	Airdate
14	1	The Bloogles	2004
A chemical substance interferes with the Eggs' speech.			2004
15	2	Peanut Surprise	2004
Benedict wants to keep a fuzzy creature as a pet, but it multiplies to rapidly.			2004
16	3	The Stringiest Bean	2004
The Eggs try to tune a string bean.			2004
17	4	Gulpy Wulpy	2004
Shelly blames Scramble for getting her sick, and the Eggs discover omnivorous plants.			2004
18	5	Rubbish Shoot	2004
Sunnyside leaves the Eggs on Shelly so they can work on choreography.			2004
19	6	Sunnyside Up	2004
Sunnyside released a single on the Planet Groove, which causes things to go haywire.			2004
20	7	Which Came First	2004
Shelly races a chicken ship.			2004
21	8	The Black Hole	2004
The Eggs get sucked into a black hole.			2004
22	9	Doh Rey Me	2004
The inhabitants of Discordia can't stop fighting.			2004
23	10	The Missing Egg	2004
Scramble tries to cut corners with taking out the rubbish, but winds up in a bird's nest.			2004
24	11	Growth Spurt	2004
After the Worms try a new plant, they start growing and eating everything.			2004
25	12	Tune Up	2004
Sunnyside goes to jail and it's up to Yolky and Scramble to break her out.			2004
26	13	Counting the Beat	2004
A meteor damages Shelly's engines, which sends them on a crash course with the sun.			2004

=== Series 3 (2005) ===
Episode #	In Season	Title	Airdate
27	1	Double Yolkers	2005
The Eggs fly into a purple hole and meet their counterparts, who are the opposite of them.			2005
28	2	Cinderbot	2005
Scramble reprograms Eggor to clean the ship.			2005
29	3	Message in a Bottle	2005
The Eggs try to deal with an curmudgeon's bad attitude. They also try to rein in their negative emotions until Sunnyside finally snaps.			2005
30	4	Music Trap	2005
Benedict is suspicious about a new planet.			
31	5	The Big Freeze	2005
Scramble makes Shelly cry after Sunnyside throws her under the bus.			2005
32	6	Too Much of a Good Thing	2005
When complaining about doing chores, Scramble slips into a cleaning product, causing it to bounce everywhere and break one of the pipes. A pink gas leaks out from the pipes, causing Scramble to be in love. He feels happy while the other people look confused, and investigate him. When it's confirmed that he's is in love, they try to bring him back to normal.			2005
33	7	Now You See Her	2005
Yolky tries to make a growth potion, but misses a vital ingredient that causes the potion to make her invisible instead.			2005
34	8	Pet Show	2005
Sunnyside's Worms train for the pet show.			2005
35	9	The Bubatuba	2005
Scramble's negligence causes a powerful smell to knock everyone unconscious. NOTE: This episode was seen as an allegory to drug use.			2005
36	10	The Silent Shell	2005
Yolky tries to keep a dangerous plant.			2005
37	11	The Flying Pan	2005
The Eggs try to deal with a frying pan.			2005
38	12	The March of Ides	2005
The Eggs recruit a marching band.			2005
39	13	Crosswinds	2005
The Eggs have to choose between going to the Gammies award show on the planet Octavia and riding a solar wind to get back to Kazoo.			2005

=== Series 4 (2005) ===
Episode #	In Season	Title	Airdate
40	1	Treasure Island	2005
A group of pirate raid the ship.			2005
41	2	Water Music	2005
The Eggs hear mysterious music.			2005
42	3	Top of the Pops	2005
The Eggs are signed on to a record deal.			2005
43	4	The Dance Craze	2005
The Eggs visit a planet where dancing without music is a lifestyle.			2005
44	5	Lost in Space	2005
Scramble gets lost in space trying to get rid of rubbish.			2005
45	6	Copy Cat	2005
The Eggs try to unravel a web of confusion and lies after the Copy Cats take over their ship.			2005
46	7	Country Music Blues	2005
The Eggs visit Wailin' World, where everyone cries from listening to sad music... including the Eggs!			2005
47	8	Plunka	2005
A jealous instrument steals all of the others.			2005
48	9	A Visit to Oogy	2005
The Eggs help Oogy do something good.			2005
49	10	Don't Go Home	2005
The Worms want to go back to Ineptune.			2005
50	11	Return to Monotogmous	2005
The Eggs revisit Monotogmous, but they're barred from leaving.			2005
51	12	The Deserter	2005
A depressed Scramble doesn't want to go back to Kazoo.			2005
52	13	Homecoming	2005
The Eggs go back to Kazoo to sing the song of Homecoming.			2005
