= Peter Outerbridge =

Canadian actor (born 1966)

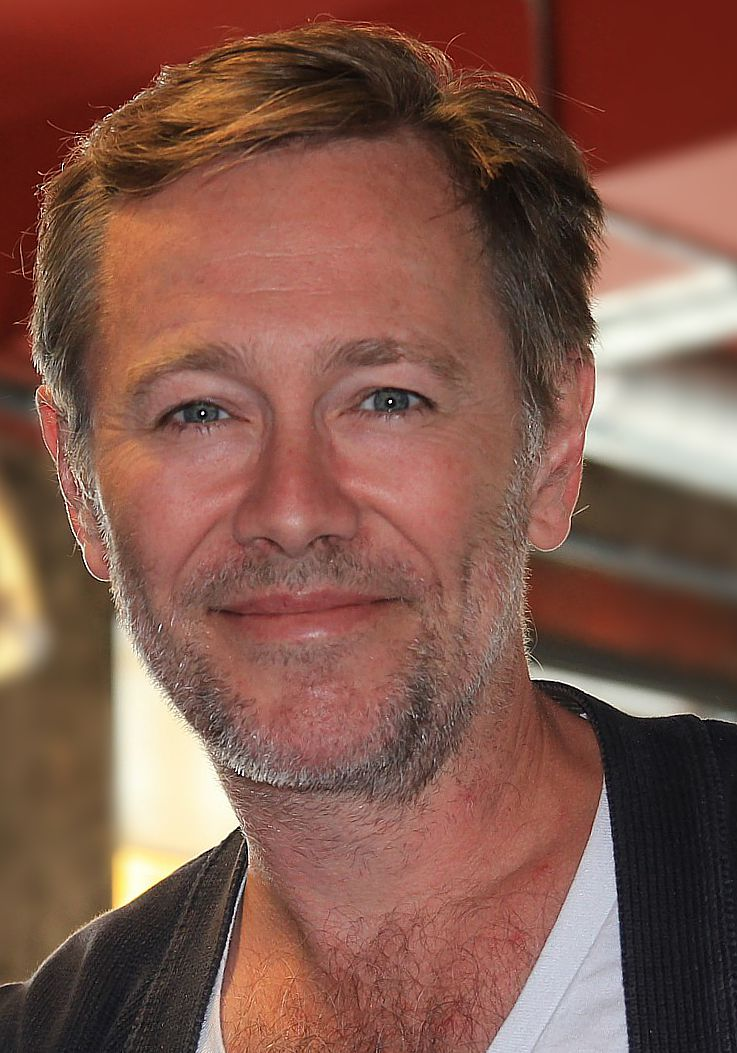
- Outerbridge in 2013
- Born: June 30, 1966 (age 60); Toronto, Ontario, Canada
- Occupation: Actor
- Years active: 1990–present
- Spouse: Tammy Isbell (m. 2000)
- Children: 2

Peter Outerbridge (born June 30, 1966) is a Canadian actor, best known for his role as Ari Tasarov in the CW action series Nikita, Dr. David Sandström in the TMN series ReGenesis, Henrik "Hank" Johanssen in Orphan Black, Bob Corbett in Bomb Girls, William Easton in Saw VI, George Brown in the television film John A.: Birth of a Country, and Black Mask in Batwoman. He also played the lead role of Detective William Murdoch in a three-episode mini-series, The Murdoch Mysteries, in its initial run on Canadian television, with two episodes shown in 2004 and a third in 2005.

== Early life ==
Outerbridge was born and raised in Toronto, Ontario, the son of a lawyer and youngest of five siblings.

== Career ==
After high school Outerbridge enrolled at the University of Victoria to study acting. Afterwards he toured Canada for four years with the theatre group Way Off Broadway. In 1997 and 2002, he was nominated in the Canadian Genie Awards as the best actor in the films Kissed and Marine Life, respectively. He was also nominated in the Gemini Awards for his achievements. Outerbridge won a 2013 Canadian Screen Award for Best Performance by an Actor in a Featured Supporting Role in a Dramatic Program or Series for his role in John A.: Birth of a Country.

Between May 2004 and September 2005, Outerbridge starred in The Murdoch Mysteries, a trilogy of television films based on the novels by Maureen Jennings. The films were "Except the Dying", "Poor Tom Is Cold" and "Under the Dragon's Tail". Murdoch Mysteries became a successful long-running series, albeit without Outerbridge, who was succeeded in the lead role by Yannick Bisson.

Outerbridge had a recurring role in the second season of Orphan Black, portraying the character Henrik "Hank" Johanssen, a Prolethean religious leader who is against the scientific processes that created the clones.

In 2021, Outerbridge recurred in the second season of Batwoman as Black Mask.

== Personal life ==
In May 2000, he married actress Tammy Isbell. Together they have twins, Samuel and Thomas (born 2004).

== Filmography ==
=== Film ===
Year	Title	Role	Notes
1993	Hate Mail	Randal	Short
1993	Paris, France	Sloan	
1993	For the Moment	Johnny	
1993	Cool Runnings	Josef Grool	
1994	Replikator	John Cheever	
1995	The Michelle Apts.	Jules	
1995	Fools Die Fast	Eddie	
1996	Kissed	Matt	
1999	Better Than Chocolate	Judy	
1999	Escape Velocity	Lee Nash AKA Carter	
2000	Mission to Mars	Sergei Kirov	
2000	Marine Life	Robert Kiely	
2000	Double Frame	Special Agent Sean Donahue	
2001	Chasing Cain	Bob Kozlowski	
2002	Men with Brooms	James Lennox	
2002	The Bay of Love and Sorrows	Everette Hatch	
2003	Cold Creek Manor	Dave Miller	
2003	June & Orlando	Orlando	Short
2004	Ill Fated	Earl	
2005	Land of the Dead	Styles	
2006	Lucky Number Slevin	Dumbrowski	
2006	Population 436	Deputy Christian Hecker	Video
2009	Burning Mussolini	Det. Ryan Johnson	
2009	Saw VI	William Easton	
2012	Silent Hill: Revelation	Travis Grady	
2013	Haunter	Bruce Johnson	
2015	Len and Company	Frank Coulter	
2015	Voracious	Jed	
2016	Shut In	Richard Portman	
2018	Level 16	Dr. Miro	
2018	Honey Bee	Christian	
2019	Viaticum	Frank	Short film
2019	Code 8	Cumbo	
2020	The Oak Room	Paul	
2023	Close to You	Jim	
2026	Someone's Daughter	Mr. Borden	

=== Television ===
Year	Title	Role	Notes
1990	21 Jump Street	Jeff Chandler	"Just Say No! High"
1991	The Hidden Room	Rick	"Wasting Away"
1991	Drop Dead Gorgeous	Dylan Wiatt	TV film
1991–1993	The Commish	Jeff Hartley	Recurring role
1992	Diagnosis Murder: Diagnosis of Murder	Barry Donovan	TV film
1992	Nightmare Café	Jesse	"Fay & Ivy"
1992	Secret Service	Talbot	"Programmer/Child's Play"
1993	Top Cops	Stephen Davis	"Mike Sheehan and Stephen Davis"
1994	Another Woman	Paul Temple	TV film
1994	Forever Knight	Young Thomas Constantine	"Father's Day"
1995	Road to Avonlea	Count Marek	"What a Tangled Web We Weave"
1995	Falling for You	Greg	TV films
1995	The Android Affair	Thomas Benti	TV films
1995	Highlander: The Series	Paul Kinman	"Reluctant Heroes"
1995, 1999 & 2001	The Outer Limits	Dr. Andy Groenig/Ned Bailey/Zach Griffiths	"The New Breed", "What Will the Neighbors Think?" & "Replica"
1996	Lonesome Dove: The Outlaw Years	Ned	"Betrayal"
1996	Closer and Closer	Adam	TV films
1996	Captive Heart: The James Mink Story	William Johnson	TV films
1996	Jack Reed: Death and Vengeance	Sergei	TV films
1996	Giant Mine	Jim O'Neil	TV films
1996	Dinner Along the Amazon	Rodney	TV films
1997	Murder in My Mind	Jack Bolinas	TV films
1997	La Femme Nikita	Roger	"Treason"
1997–1998	Michael Hayes	John Manning	Main role
1998–1999	Millennium	Special Agent Barry Baldwin	Recurring role
1999	Escape from Mars	John Rank	TV films
1999	Thrill Seekers	Felder	TV films
2000	Out of Sync	Roger Deacon	TV films
2001	The Pretender 2001	Alex	TV films
2001	Earth: Final Conflict	Joe	"Subterra"
2001	Paradise Falls	Tyrone Fox	"Fatal Attraction", "Jessica Fights Back" & "Goodbye Tyrone"
2002	The Rendering	Theodore Gray	TV films
2002	Trudeau	Jim Coutts	TV films
2002	Mentors	Dr. Milton Bradshaw	"Secrets and Lies", "A Matter of Time: Part 1" & "A Matter of Time: Part 2"
2002	Monk	Trevor McDowell	"Mr. Monk and the Marathon Man"
2002	100 Days in the Jungle	Gord Black	TV films
2002	Chasing Cain: Face	Det. Bob Kozlowski	TV films
2003	The Risen	Nick Simms	TV films
2003	24	Ronnie Stark	"Day 2: 2:00 a.m. - 3:00 a.m." & "Day 2: 3:00 a.m. - 4:00 a.m."
2003	Miracles	Jason Herlock	"Paul Is Dead"
2004	This Is Wonderland	Dale Robertson	"1.7"
2004	The D.A.	Jerry Weicker	Recurring role
2004	Medical Investigation	Clark White	"Progeny"
2004	Chicks with Sticks	Curt Bonner	TV film
2004–2005	The Murdoch Mysteries	Det. William Murdoch	"Except the Dying", "Poor Tom Is Cold" & "Under the Dragon's Tail"
2004–2008	ReGenesis	David Sandstrom	Main role
2005	Tilt	Randy Cioffi	"Gentleman Jim" & "Shuffle Up and Deal"
2005	Million Dollar Murder	Gordon Wintrob	TV film
2006	Puppets Who Kill	Phil Goody	"The Rival House"
2006	10.5: Apocalypse	Alec Becker	Miniseries
2006	Behind the Camera: The Unauthorized Story of Diff'rent Strokes	Al Burton	TV films
2006	Intimate Stranger	Denis Teague	TV films
2007	In God's Country	Officer Wayne	TV films
2007	My Name Is Sarah	Charlie Manning	TV films
2007	Whistler	Peter Varland	Recurring role
2008	Fringe	Dr. Reyes	"Pilot"
2008	Sanctuary	Malcolm Dawkins	"Folding Man"
2008	Heartland	Brad Borden	"Summer's End"
2009	Flashpoint	Walter Volcek	"Clean Hands"
2009	Deadliest Sea	Capt. Jack Colvin	TV film
2010	Happy Town	Dan Farmer	Main role
2010	Reviving Ophelia	Walter Jones	TV film
2010–2013	Nikita	Ari Tasarov	Recurring role
2011	John A.: Birth of a Country	George Brown	TV film
2011–2012	The Listener	Magnus Elphrenson	"The Magician" & "Now You See Him"
2012	Suits	Keith Hoyt	"All In"
2012	Beauty and the Beast	Silverfox	"Pilot", "All In" & "Basic Instinct"
2012–2013	Bomb Girls	Bob Corbett	Main role
2013	Darknet	Henry	"Darknet 6"
2014	Bomb Girls: Facing the Enemy	Bob Corbett	TV film
2014	Orphan Black	Henrik Johanssen	Recurring roles
2014	Dark Rising: Warrior of the Worlds	Aramas	Recurring roles
2015	Murdoch Mysteries	Father Keegan	"Shipwreck"
2015	Blood and Water	Det. Al Gorski	Main role
2015–2016	12 Monkeys	Dr. Elliot Jones	"Arms of Mine", "Hyena" & "Legacy"
2015–2016	The Art of More	Ashbel Whitman	Recurring role
2016	Poor Richard's Almanack	Eric	TV film
2016	Houdini & Doyle	Thomas Edison	"Necromanteion"
2016	Zoo	General Andrew Davies	Recurring roles
2016–2017	Designated Survivor	Charlie Langdon	Recurring roles
2017	Incorporated	Phill Brill	"Executables", "Burning Platform" & "Golden Parachute"
2017	Pure	Eli Voss	Main role
2017	No Easy Days	Paul Reynolds	Recurring roles
2017	The Expanse	Captain Martens	Recurring roles
2019	The Umbrella Academy	The Conductor	Recurring roles
2019	V-Wars	Calix Niklos	Recurring roles
2020	Hudson & Rex		"Old Dog, New Tricks"
2021	Batwoman	Roman Sionis / Black Mask	Recurring role
2022	In the Dark	Jimmy McKay	"No Cane Do", "The Deep End", "Going Up", & "Please Shine Down on Me"
2023	Sullivan's Crossing	Walter	
2025	It: Welcome to Derry	Clint Bowers	Recurring role
2026	Interview with the Vampire	The Marquis	"Toledo"
2026	I Will Find You	Philip Mackenzie	Main role
2026	Neagley	Arvid Rawlings	Recurring role

=== Video games ===
Year	Title	Role
2014	Far Cry 4	Additional Voices
2018	Far Cry 5	Additional Voices
2019	Far Cry New Dawn	Additional Voices

=== Voice work ===
Year	Title	Role	Notes
1994	Frontline	Translation voice	"Romeo and Juliet in Sarajevo"
2007	The Real Superhumans and the Quest for the Future Fantastic	Narrator	Documentary
2008	Afghanada	Master Corporal Matt Crowder	CBC Radio drama series
2010	Beast Legends	Narrator	Documentary
2011	Zombies: A Living History	Narrator	Documentary
2012	Trust, Inc.	Councillor James Yearwood	CBC Radio drama series
