= Shaftesbury (production company) =

Canadian film and television production company

Shaftesbury Films, Inc.
- Logo used since 2018
- Type: Private
- Industry: Film; Television; Digital media
- Founded: 1987; 39 years ago
- Founder: Christina Jennings
- Headquarters: 18 Logan Avenue, Toronto, Ontario, Canada
- Key people: Christina Jennings (Chairwoman and CEO); Scott Garvie (Senior VP, Business & Legal Affairs); Rob Fox (EVP of Production, AMC Studios); Benjamin Davis (EVP of Original Programming, AMC Networks and AMC Studios)
- Owner: AMC Networks (minority stake)
- Divisions: Shaftesbury Kids
- Website: shaftesbury.ca

Shaftesbury Films, Inc. is a Canadian privately-owned production company founded by Christina Jennings in 1987, that specializes in film, television, and digital media production. Its headquarters are located in Toronto, Ontario.

== Background ==
Shaftesbury is a creator and producer of original content for television and digital platforms. Shaftesbury's slate includes 19 seasons of Murdoch Mysteries for CBC, UKTV, and ITV STUDIOS Global Entertainment; detective drama Frankie Drake for CBC; Houdini & Doyle for Sony Pictures Television, Corus Entertainment, ITV, and Fox; thriller series Slasher for NBCUniversal's Chiller and now available on Netflix; and CBC Kids series The Moblees. Shaftesbury's digital arm, Smokebomb Entertainment, produces original digital, convergent, and branded entertainment projects including the YouTube series and upcoming movie Carmilla; mystery series V Morgan Is Dead; fashion comedy series MsLabelled, produced in partnership with Shaw Media and Tetley Tea; supernatural drama Inhuman Condition; and the Slasher VR app for iOS, Android, and Oculus Rift. In June 2014, Shaftesbury partnered with Youth Culture to launch shift2, a branded entertainment agency. In 2013, the company signed a first look deal with ABC.

== Productions ==
Productions include Bloodletting & Miraculous Cures for HBO Canada, based on the Giller-prize winning book by Dr. Vincent Lam; five seasons of The Listener for CTV and Fox International Channels; and now in season ten of Murdoch Mysteries for Citytv/CBC and UKTV's Alibi. Shaftesbury also produced a variety of award-winning programming, including the global hit series Life with Derek and the movie follow-up to the series, Vacation with Derek. Shaftesbury's newest series, Good Dog, is a half-hour comedy created, written and directed by Ken Finkleman that premiered on HBO Canada in 2011.

== Divisions ==
Shaftesbury's divisions include Smokebomb Entertainment, the company's digital media division responsible for the development and production of original online series and companion web experiences for Shaftesbury's slate of properties; Shaftesbury Kids, their division responsible for several children's TV shows and movies; and Shaftesbury Sales Company, which manages international sales and distribution for the company's content.

== Television ==
The company's television series projects have included:

- 11 Cameras
- Aaron Stone
- The Atwood Stories
- Backpackers
- Baxter
- Bloodletting & Miraculous Cures
- The Borderline
- Connor Undercover
- Dark Oracle (co-produced with Cookie Jar Entertainment)
- Dead Still
- Fool Canada
- Frankie Drake Mysteries
- From Spain with Love with Annie Sibonney
- Good Dog
- Good God
- Houdini & Doyle
- Hudson & Rex
- The Jane Show
- Life with Derek
- The Listener
- Mischief City
- The Moblees
- Murdoch Mysteries
- Overruled!
- ReGenesis
- Ruby and the Well
- Screech Owls
- The Shields Stories
- SisterS (co-produced with Peer Pressure Productions)
- Slasher
- The Sounds
- Splashlings

== Film ==
Television films produced by Shaftesbury have included:

- External Affairs, an adaptation of Timothy Findley's play The Stillborn Lover
- Diverted
- In the Dark
- Michael Ignatieff's novel Scar Tissue
- Hemingway vs. Callaghan, an adaptation of Morley Callaghan's That Summer in Paris
- Except the Dying, Poor Tom Is Cold and Under the Dragon's Tail, the first three novels in Maureen Jennings' Murdoch Mysteries franchise which was later adapted by the company into a weekly series
- Torso: The Evelyn Dick Story, a dramatization of the murder trial of Evelyn Dick
- Terry, a biopic of Terry Fox
- six Joanne Kilbourn mysteries, based on the novels by Gail Bowen
- Eight Days To Live
- In God's Country
- Mount Pleasant
- The Good Times Are Killing Me
- Skyrunners
- Me and Luke
- The Summit
- Sleep Murder
- She Drives Me Crazy
- The Robber Bride
- Lay Them Straight

Cinema films have included:

- Swann, based on the novel by Carol Shields,
- Conquest
- Painted Angels
- Camilla
- Long Life, Happiness & Prosperity
- People Hold On
- An American Dream: The Education of William Bowman

Digital films, produced by digital arm Smokebomb Entertainment, include:

- Darken

== Digital ==
The company's digital series projects, produced by digital arm Smokebomb Entertainment, have included:

- Backpackers
- Carmilla
- Emerald Code
- Houdini & Doyle: World of Wonders
- Inhuman Condition
- MsLabelled
- Murdoch Mysteries: The Curse of the Lost Pharaohs
- Murdoch Mysteries: The Murdoch Effect
- Murdoch Mysteries: Nightmare on Queen Street
- State of Syn
- Unlikely Heroes
- Gay Mean Girls
- Ghost BFF

The company's digital arm also oversees KindaTV, the company's distribution channel through YouTube hosted by Natasha Negovanlis.
