= The Beneficiary =

- Directed by: Graeme Burfoot
- Written by: Graeme Burfoot
- Produced by: Jude Lengel
- Starring: Hélène Joy; Barry Otto
- Edited by: Peter Blaxland
- Music by: Stephen Rae
- Release date: 1997
- Running time: 12 minutes
- Country: Australia
- Language: English

The Beneficiary is a 1997 Australian crime thriller short film directed by Graeme Burfoot.

The film was aired at several international film festivals, such as the Torino Film Festival, the Cork Film Festival, the Tampere International Short Film Festival, the Hamburg Short Film Festival, the Edinburgh International Film Festival and the Seattle International Film Festival.

== Cast ==
- Barry Otto as Lenart Dunbar
- Helene Joy as Helen Desaree

== Accolades ==
- Winner of 1997 Australian Film Institute's Animal Logic Award for Best Short Fiction Film
- Winner of 1998 Palm Springs International Film Festival of Short Films Best Live Action Under 15 minutes award
- Short-listed in final ten shorts at 1999 Academy Awards
