= Erie Police Department =

Law enforcement agency in Erie, Pennsylvania

The Erie Police Department, established in 1851, is the principal law enforcement agency serving the city of Erie, Pennsylvania.

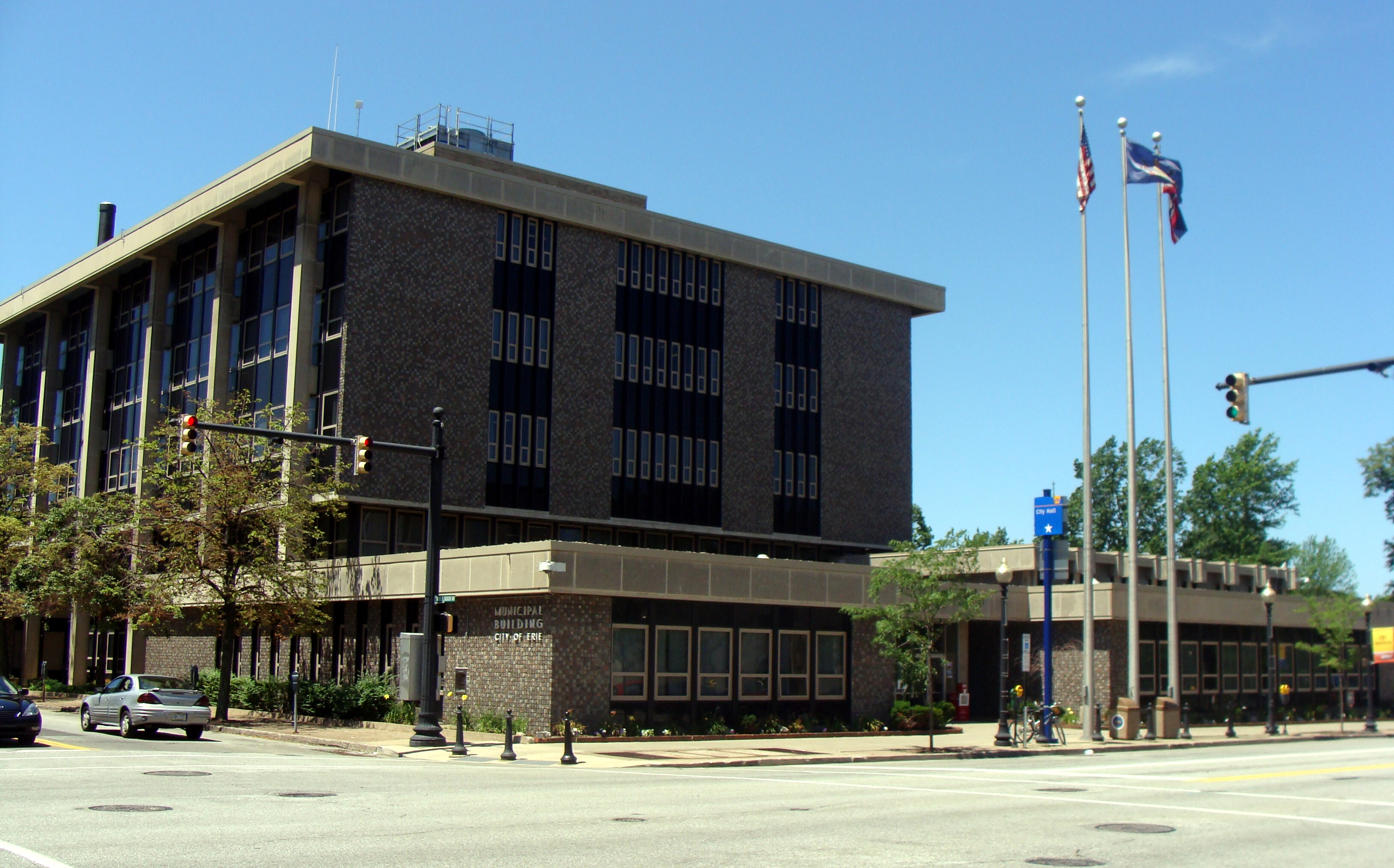
The Erie Municipal Building on State Street

== History ==
The idea of the department was conceived with the City Charter of 1851. By 1856, the department consisted of a Chief of police and three patrolmen. By the late 1880s, the department had grown to 25 officers. These officers primarily walked the beat, however some did use bicycles to patrol, and the force also maintained a horse-drawn wagon, primarily used in prisoner transport.

During the early 1900s the department moved to more modern methods of transportation and began using motorcycles for city patrol. On June 7, 1910, the first motorcycle officer began patrolling the city. As of 2016, eight motorcycle officers patrol the streets. By the mid 1920s, automobiles were introduced as a new method of patrol for officers. New standards put forth by the FBI encouraged cities to have a ratio of two officers per 1,000 residents. The Erie Police Department attempted to meet this standard by increasing its staff to 136 officers by 1941, thus creating the need for patrol units. These units consisted of automobile patrol, motorcycle patrol, traffic enforcement, and foot patrol.

The 1960s saw the formation of the Erie Policy Academy, which would require candidates to attend a number of training classes and exercises. As technology took the main stage in the 1970s and 80's, the department began moving to an electronic record system, and in 1985, implemented its first computer system, PIDAS. Federal grants allowed the department to also add desktop computers and dictation devices to the office areas within the department.

The department currently maintains a staff of 173 police officers.

== Chief of Police ==
Daniel Spizarny, a 27-year veteran of the police force, succeeded now Sgt. Donald Dacus as Chief of Police on January 3, 2018 after Mayor Joe Schember was sworn into his first term. He rose to the rank of lieutenant and has been a detective, a patrolman and member of the SWAT team. He most recently served as the insurance fraud investigator.

== Community Relations ==
The Erie Police Department works with the community. The Erie Police Explorers program was initiated September 26, 1978. The program looks for teens and young adults between the ages of fourteen and twenty-one who hold an interest in law enforcement.

== Media Relations ==
The City of Erie Police Department holds a Media Relations Policy which sets forth the policies and agreements between the EPD and media outlets. The policy helps the department, along with local and national media, to maintain a channel of communication to the public, without violation of law or infringement on an individual's rights. The policy also describes the role of the Information Officer, the obligation to the media, media ride alongs for special assignments, special considerations, and arrest information.

== See also ==
- John Wilson Murray - former Erie detective 1868-1873
