= Benedict Arnold: A Question of Honor =

2003 television film

- Written by: William Mastrosimone
- Directed by: Mikael Salomon
- Starring: Aidan Quinn; Kelsey Grammer; Flora Montgomery; John Light
- Country of origin: United States
- Original language: English

Production
- Running time: 100 minutes

Original release
- Release: January 13, 2003

Benedict Arnold: A Question of Honor is a 2003 American television film directed by Mikael Salomon and starring Aidan Quinn, Kelsey Grammer, Flora Montgomery and John Light. It portrays the career of Benedict Arnold in the American Revolutionary War and his dramatic switch in 1780 from fighting for American Independence to being a Loyalist trying to preserve British rule in America. Arnold's relationships with his wife Peggy Shippen and the British officer John André are focused on. The friction between Arnold and General Horatio Gates, portrayed near the beginning of the film (for example, in one scene when Arnold derisively refers to him as "Granny Gates"), was historically accurate. The movie points out that, before his treason, Arnold was considered a patriot and a hero. A letter from General Washington is read at the beginning where he enthusiastically recommends Arnold for promotion saying that there is no general in the army more deserving and even comparing him to Hannibal. The movie briefly documents Arnold's final years of exile in England in which he laments his treasonous acts, realizing that he is despised and that people compare him with Judas and Lucifer.

== Plot ==
The movie opens with these words:

The American Revolution bitterly divided the people:
A third calling themselves Patriots fought for a free and independent nation.
A third called themselves Loyalists remaining loyal to Great Britain.
A third remained neutral.
Against the world's greatest power, the patriots suffered many defeats.
Thousands gave their lives for an ideal:
The United States of America.

In a letter to the Continental Congress, George Washington recommends Brigadier General Benedict Arnold for promotion to Major General for the numerous acts of heroism he made as an ardent Patriot. Washington first cites Arnold's invasion of Canada through the Maine wilderness, a feat he compares to Hannibal's march over the Alps. Washington notes that if Arnold hadn't been wounded during the Battle of Quebec, Canada would now be the 14th State. He then notes Arnold's victory in the Battle of Valcour Island in which that although Arnold lost all his ships, he succeeded in stopping an invasion from the north by the British. He also reveals that he is now helping General Horatio Gates stave off another invasion from the north.

At Saratoga, Gates has called Arnold off the battlefield. Gates tells him that he has ordered a retreat. Arnold reminds him that they have a joint command of the Northern Army and that he therefore cannot order a retreat without consulting with him first. Gates reveals that thanks to his political connections Congress has elevated him to First in Command of the Northern Army and restates his order. Arnold refuses to comply and instead leads the Northern Army to victory, at the cost of being shot in his leg. Arnold's victory forces British General Burgoyne to surrender to Gates. Gates claims all the credit for the victory while Arnold undergoes treatment for his leg after he refuses to have it amputated. Gates goes on to command the Continental Army's Southern Army while Arnold goes home after the treatment is over.

Months later, Arnold is invited by Washington to join him at Valley Forge where he is made a ranking Major General. Meanwhile, in Philadelphia, the British are about to evacuate the city for New York City. Captain John André promises his girlfriend Peggy Shippen he will return for her. Sometime later, Arnold arrives in the city due to being appointed by Washington as Military Governor with his aide de camp Major David Franks. Joseph Reed, Pennsylvania's Governor, tries to intimidate him but Arnold faces the Pennsylvania Militia down in a way that makes them stand down. Peggy, who was watching, is impressed. Later, Arnold makes a deal with a merchant to supply army wagons that will bring his goods to Philadelphia in return for fifty percent of the profits. He then hosts a party to celebrate the second Independence Day. At the party, he meets Peggy and falls in love with her. Reed, who is attending, again tries to intimidate Arnold but again Arnold makes him back down.

Arnold courts Peggy and eventually proposes marriage to her. Peggy's father Judge Shippen objects to the marriage because of Arnold's self-righteous Puritanism, his lowly circumstances, his reputation as a "thin-skinned hothead", Reed's attacks on his character in newspapers, and his being a cripple because of his injury at Saratoga. Judge Shippen tells Arnold he will not let him marry Peggy unless he agrees to a court-martial in order to clear his name. Arnold goes to Washington to request a court-martial. He then goes back and marries Peggy. That night, Mount Pleasant, Arnold's Pennsylvanian home, is besieged by an angry mob over his marriage. Arnold sends Franks to Washington to send Continental soldiers to protect his house, his sister Hannah Arnold, his sons Benedict Arnold VI, Richard Arnold and Henry Arnold, and Peggy. However, when Franks returns he informs Arnold that Washington will send no troops and instead presents Arnold with a bill from the Continental Congress for the use of the army wagons. Peggy convinces her husband that Congress and Washington do not value him and do not appreciate his sacrifices and to defect to the British army. Peggy sends a letter to André, who has long since become a Major and the Adjunct General in the British Army. Major André informs Sir Henry Clinton, the Commander in Chief of the British Army, that Arnold wants to defect and offer his services to the Crown. Sir Henry tells Andre to send a letter back to demand that the "American Achilles" deliver up West Point to them to test Arnold. Arnold sends back terms to them. He then attends his court marshal. Meanwhile, it's revealed that the reason Washington did not send troops is because the Continental Army is in a state of mutiny. Arnold is reprimanded by Washington for being a war profiteer on Congress's orders. It quickly becomes clear to Arnold that he is now held in contempt when a soldier who once praised him mouths off to him. Washington offers Arnold command of the Left Wing of the Main Continental Army so he can return to active service and regain the esteem of the Continentals. This makes Arnold have second thought about his decision to defect as this will make him second in command of the entire Continental Army. Peggy tells him it is too late as Sir Henry has already agreed to the deal he offered. Arnold goes back to Washington to beg him for command of West Point. Washington grants him his request.

Six months later, Arnold and Peggy are living right beside West Point with their infant son Edward Arnold. Arnold meets with Joshua Smith who informs him that André will meet with him aboard HMS Vulture. However the ship opens fire on him. Peggy informs him that it was a gunboat that opened fire on him not the Vulture. Arnold informs her Washington and his General Staff are coming. Peggy tells Benedict that if he delivers them up to the British as well he will no doubt be made a Lord and Viceroy of British America. Arnold sends a message to André offering this and demanding that André meet him on land. Sir Henry agrees to this and tells André he will be given a knighthood when he returns. Franks confronts Arnold about his business with Smith and Arnold tells him Smith is part of a plan to end the war.

André arrives and they work out the plan to take West Point and the Continental General Staff. However, cannons open fire on the Vulture and André is forced to return on land. However, he's caught by skinners and turned over to Colonel John Jameson. Jameson sends news of "Anderson's" capture to Arnold and the plans to West Point to Washington. Upon getting the message, Arnold thanks Franks for his devotion and flees to the Vulture which he escapes on. Washington arrives to find the Fort and men unarmed and the sentries missing and demands to know what's going on. The messenger with the plans for West Point arrives and delivers them and a letter to His Excellency General Washington. Washington tells everyone "Arnold has betrayed us! Apparently, he was about to deliver up West Point to the enemy with all of us! If our greatest warrior is a traitor can anyone be trusted?!" Franks, Smith, and Joseph Calhoon are arrested. The men at West Point are called back to the Fort where they are told to put down the picks and shovels Arnold ordered them to carry around and pick up their muskets. The cannons are soon put back in place. West Point is soon prepared for a British attack. Arnold now a British Brigadier General offers himself up for André. Sir Henry refuses on the ground a deserter is never given up. Arnold replies he does not consider himself a deserter to which Sir Henry tells him "What you think you are and what the world assigns will always be at odds." André is hung.

Eighteen years later, Arnold and Peggy are living in the United Kingdom. Arnold is forced to realize that he is hated as a man whose name will be ranked in granite amongst the betrayers. The epilogue announces that Arnold died three years later and that his only monument at Saratoga does not bear his name but merely reads "In memory of the most brilliant soldier of the Continental Army who was desperately wounded in this spot winning the most decisive battle of the Revolution and for himself the rank of Major General."

== Main cast ==
- Aidan Quinn as Benedict Arnold
- Kelsey Grammer as George Washington
- Flora Montgomery as Peggy Shippen
- John Light as John André
- Nick Dunning as Henry Clinton
- Stephen Hogan as Joseph Reed
- Allen Leech as British Officer
- Jane Brennan as Hannah Arnold
- Anthony Brophy as Lord Lauderdale

== See also ==
- List of films about the American Revolution
- List of television series and miniseries about the American Revolution
