= Hélène Joy =

Australian actress (born 1978)

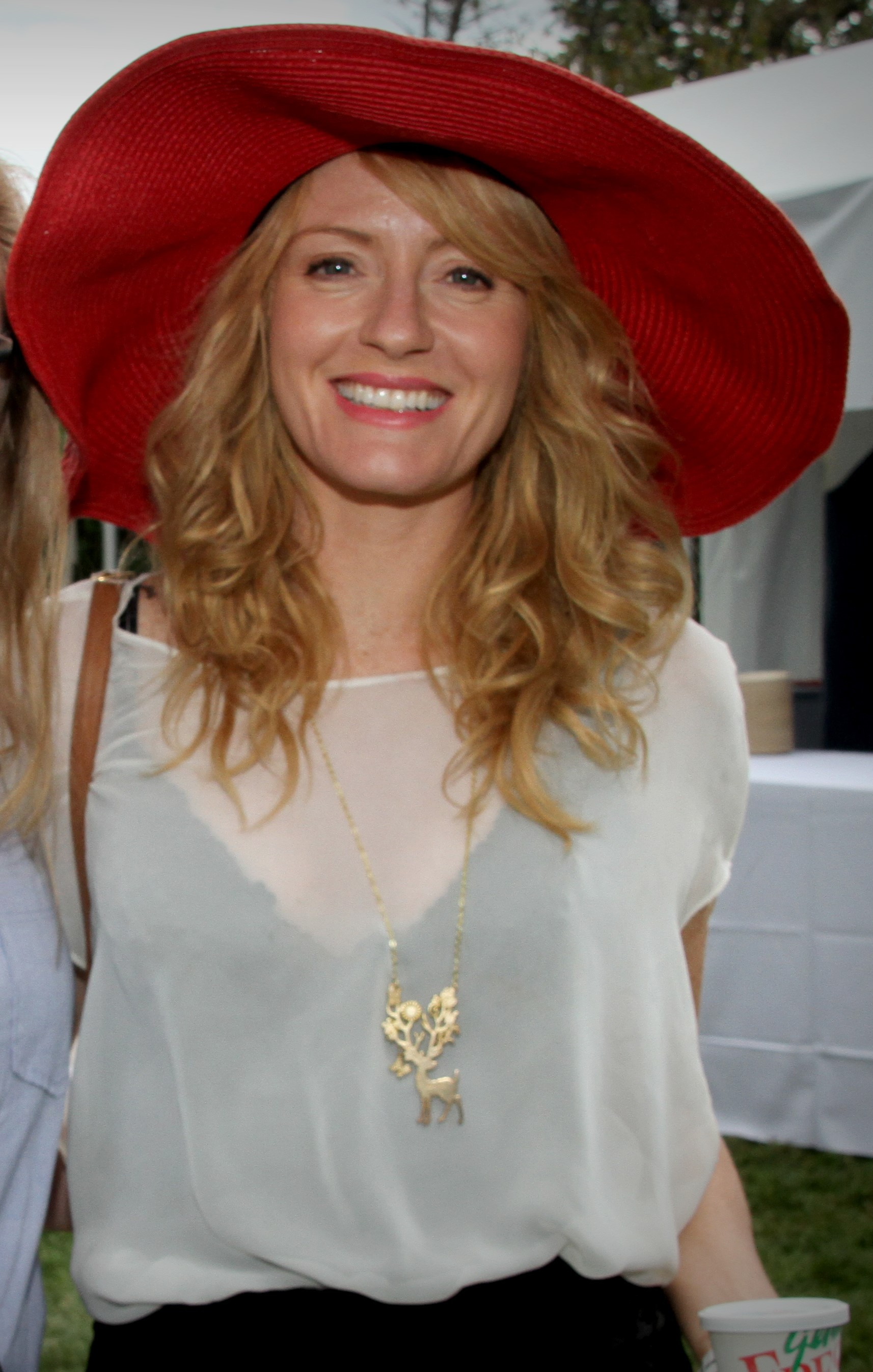
- Joy in 2012
- Born: 21 October 1978 (age 48); Perth, Western Australia, Australia
- Occupation: Actress
- Years active: 1996–present
- Children: 1

Hélène Joy (born 21 October 1978) is an Australian actress, who is best known for her work in television series Durham County and Murdoch Mysteries.

== Biography ==
Joy was born and raised in Perth, Australia. She began acting in Kewdale Senior High School in Perth. She subsequently toured Europe with a youth theatre company. She spent a year as a theatre major at Curtin University before winning a place at the Western Australian Academy of Performing Arts in Perth where she obtained an acting diploma. She won the academy's Leslie Anderson Award for Best Performer.

== Career ==
=== Television and film ===
She had minor roles in Australian television series such as: Snowy River: The McGregor Saga (1996), Water Rats (1996–97), Big Sky (1997), and Stingers (1999). After three years, at the urging of her then boyfriend, she moved to Vancouver, British Columbia, Canada.

After arriving in Vancouver, Joy found work on shows such as First Wave (2000), The Outer Limits (2001), The Chris Isaak Show (2002), and The Twilight Zone (2002). In 2003, she landed the lead role of Judy Surgick in the short-lived CBC TV sitcom An American in Canada (2003–04) which was a 2003 Gemini Award nominee for Best Ensemble Performance Comedy Series/Program. In 2005 she appeared in the feature film Desolation Sound.

While still in Vancouver, Joy began landing roles in Toronto, including a supporting role in the TV movie The Murdoch Mysteries:Under the Dragon’s Tail (2004). After moving to Toronto, she played recurring roles in TV series such as This Is Wonderland (2005–06) and ReGenesis (2006). She then starred in Durham County between 2007 and 2010, and appeared as Doc in the primetime soap opera MVP: The Secret Lives of Hockey Wives (2008).

In Christmas 2007, Joy appeared in the fantastical musical film version of the Nutcracker ballet, The Secret of the Nutcracker starring opposite Brian Cox for the CBC. Joy starred in An Old Fashioned Thanksgiving with Jacqueline Bisset for Hallmark in 2008.

Joy has made guest appearances on Heartland, Rookie Blue (2011), Republic of Doyle (2012) and The L.A. Complex (2012) among other programs.

Although she played a different character in Under the Dragon's Tail, the third made-for-television film about William Murdoch and his unique ways of doing detective work, the book's author, Maureen Jennings, was so impressed with Joy's acting ability that she successfully pressed the TV show's producers to select her for the role of Dr. Julia Ogden. As a result, Joy was hired for the part and has played this continuing character in the period detective drama Murdoch Mysteries since 2008.

=== Theatre ===
Joy's theatrical career began in Australia with roles in the Shakespeare Program at the Bell Shakespeare Company. She then played a number of roles at the Melbourne Theatre Company: Ophelia in Hamlet, Lady Macbeth in Macbeth, and Juliet in Romeo and Juliet. She made her Canadian theatrical debut in 2012 in Australian playwright Andrew Bovell's Speaking in Tongues at The Company Theatre in Toronto.

=== Voice acting ===
She supplied the voice of Sunnyside and Shelly in The Eggs (2004), Gabby and Polly in Faireez (2005), Patsy and Mrs. Berton in The Secret World of Og (2006), Opal in Pearlie (2009), and Vice Principal Victoria in Detentionaire (2012).

== Awards and nominations ==
In 2006, Joy was nominated for a Gemini Award for Best Performance by an Actress in a Featured Supporting Role in a Dramatic Program or Mini-Series for her work in the TV movie The Murdoch Mysteries: Under the Dragon’s Tail as well as being nominated for Best Performance by an Actress in a Guest Role Dramatic Series for ReGenesis. In 2011, and again in 2012, she was nominated for Outstanding Actress in a Drama Series for her work in Murdoch Mysteries by the Monte-Carlo TV Festival Awards.

She won a Leo Award in 2005 for Best Lead Performance by an Actress in a Feature Length Drama for her role in Desolation Sound.

She won the Gemini Award for Best Performance by an Actress in a Continuing Leading Dramatic Role in 2008 for her role in Durham County.

== Personal life ==
Joy left Australia and followed her boyfriend to his native Vancouver. She has been a vegan and enjoys travelling all over the world during her time off. Joy trained and is licensed as a real estate agent in Australia, and she has subsequently taken up property development.

In late December 2021, Joy gave birth to a daughter, Harrison Joy.

== Filmography ==
=== Film ===
Year	Title	Role	Notes
1997	The Beneficiary	Helen Desareé	Short film
2005	Desolation Sound	Laurel Elliott	
2005	Feed	Young Phillip's Mother	
2011	At the Bottom of the Hill	Alice	Short film
2012	100 Musicians	DJ Collingwood (voice)	Short film
2016	Sadie's Last Days on Earth	Hope Mitchell	
2021	Woman in Car	Anne	

=== Television ===
Year	Title	Role	Notes
1996	The Man from Snowy River	Agnes Windsor	"The Claimant"
1996	G.P.	Sasha Smith	"Sleeping Beauty"
1996–1997	Water Rats	Lucy White / Gina Downie	"The Shaft" & "Sex Games"
1997	Big Sky	Kate Vernon	"Simple Twist of Fate"
1997	Fable	Shelley	TV film
1998	Blue Heelers	Marina Armstrong	"Little Monsters"
1998	Never Tell Me Never	Nancy	TV film
1999	Stingers	Anna De Groot	"Lunatic Fringe: Parts 1 & 2"
2000	Dr. Jekyll and Mr. Hyde	Mary Riley	TV film
2000	First Wave	Dr. Victoria Kelly	"Comes a Horseman"
2001	The Outer Limits	Dr. Louisa Kennedy	"In the Blood"
2001	Night Visions	Linda	"Hate Puppet"
2002	The Chris Isaak Show	Dr. Darcy	"The Hidden Mommy"
2002	The Twilight Zone	Linda	"Mr. Motivation"
2002–2003	An American in Canada	Judy Surgick	Main role
2003	Andromeda	Alien Queen	"Vault of the Heavens"
2004	Puppets Who Kill	Hazel	"Dan and the Necrophiliac"
2004-2005	The Eggs	Sunnyside / Shelly	Main role
2005	Faireez	Gabby / Polly	Main role
2005	The Collector	Constance	"The Ripper"
2005	Million Dollar Murder	Grace	TV film
2005	Beautiful People	Miss Patel	"Dark, Room, Chemicals"
2005	Murdoch Mysteries	Maud Pedlow	"Under the Dragon's Tail"
2005–2006	This Is Wonderland	Erica Taft	"3.2" & "3.12"
2006	ReGenesis	Audrey Graves	"China", "Escape Mutant" & "The Cocktail"
2006	The Secret World of Og	Patsy / Mrs. Berton	
2007	Secret of the Nutcracker	Mom	TV film
2007–2010	Durham County	Audrey Sweeney	Main role
2008	MVP	Doc	Main role
2008	An Old Fashioned Thanksgiving	Mary Bassett	TV film
2008–2025	Murdoch Mysteries	Dr. Julia Ogden	Main role; seasons 1–18
2009–2010	Pearlie	Opal	Recurring role
2010	A Heartland Christmas	Joanna Hawke	TV film
2011	Murdoch Mysteries: The Curse of the Lost Pharaohs	Dr. Julia Ogden	TV film
2011	Rookie Blue	Giselle Armstrong	"God's Good Grace"
2012	Detentionaire	Vice Principal Victoria (voice)	Main role
2012	The L.A. Complex	Connor's Mother	"Other Side of the Doctor"
2012	Republic of Doyle	Tamara	"Rusted Steele"
2012	Murdoch Mysteries: The Murdoch Effect	Dr. Julia Ogden	TV Film
2013	Murdoch Mysteries: Nightmare on Queen Street	Dr. Julia Ogden	TV Film
2014-2015	Heartland	Joanna Hawke	"The Pike River Cull" & "The Heart of a River"
2017	Air Farce Canada 150	Ronnie the Friend Gun Girl	Guest
