= Except the Dying =

- Title card
- Based on: Except the Dying by Maureen Jennings
- Written by: Janet MacLean
- Directed by: Michael DeCarlo
- Starring: Peter Outerbridge; Colm Meaney; Keeley Hawes; William B. Davis; Flora Montgomery
- Country of origin: Canada
- Original language: English

Production
- Producers: Scott Garvie; Laura Harbin; Christina Jennings; Virginia Rankin
- Production companies: Shaftesbury Films & Original Pictures

Original release
- Release: May 13, 2004

Related
- Poor Tom Is Cold

Except the Dying is a 2004 made-for-TV film starring Peter Outerbridge, Colm Meaney, Keeley Hawes, William B. Davis and Flora Montgomery. It was adapted by Janet MacLean from the novel of the same name by Maureen Jennings.

== Plot ==
In this film, William Murdoch is introduced as a man of strong principles who uses his unique abilities to solve crimes, sometimes using advanced science for his time.

On the street of Toronto in the 1890s, the naked body of a young chambermaid is found murdered in a back alley. Inspector Brackenreid decides that this is an accidental death, but Murdoch feels there's more to the situation at hand.

As Murdoch digs deeper into the death, he discovers that there is something more sinister going on and that the young girl was employed by a very rich and prominent family in Toronto.

Her autopsy, conducted by forensic scientist Dr. Julia Ogden working as coroner, reveals she was pregnant and had opium in her system, which makes Murdoch even more suspicious of her death. Murdoch solves the crime and brings justice for a young girl's wrongful death.

== Cast ==
- Peter Outerbridge - Detective William Murdoch
- Colm Meaney - Inspector Brackenreid
- Keeley Hawes - Dr. Julia Ogden
- William B. Davis - Alderman Godfrey Shepcote
- Flora Montgomery - Ettie Weston

== DVDs ==
One of three films that were released on DVDs in a boxed set on November 11, 2008.

On March 3, 2015, Acorn Media announced a re-release for all three films, set for May 26, 2015.
