= Matthew MacFadzean =

Canadian actor and playwright

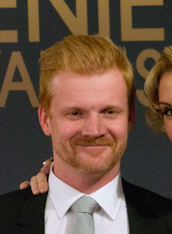
MacFadzean at the 2012 Genie Awards

Matthew MacFadzean is a Canadian actor and writer.

As an actor, he has worked at theatres across Canada, including both the Shaw and Stratford Shakespeare festivals, and on numerous TV shows. He has written and produced ten plays, the most notable works including richardthesecond, and the multi-Dora Award winning The Mill. He attended McGill University, the National Theatre School of Canada, and studied television writing at the Canadian Film Centre. He currently acts and writes for television. He is the winner of many awards including the prestigious Fox Foundation Scholarship. MacFadzean is the youngest of three children.

== Filmography ==
- Witness Insecurity - 2011
- InSecurity - 2011
- Rookie Blue - 2010
- Human Resource - 2009
- The B Team - 2009
- Time Bomb - 2008
- Nuremberg: Nazis on Trial - 2006
- Sohni Sapna (Beautiful Dream) - 2005
- Sohni Sapna - 2005
- Murdoch Mysteries - 2004 - 2005
- The Eleventh Hour - 2004
- Street Time - 2003
- Owning Mahowny - 2003
- Mutant X - 2001-2002
- You've Got a Friend - 2002
- The Big Heist - 2001
- Exhibit A: Secrets of Forensic Science - 1997
