= Flora Montgomery =

Northern Ireland actress (born 1974)

- Born: 4 January 1974 (age 52); Greyabbey, County Down, Northern Ireland
- Occupation: Actress
- Spouse: Søren Jessen

Flora Anne Selina Montgomery (born 4 January 1974) is a Northern Irish actress.

== Early life and family ==
Montgomery was born at her family's ancestral home in Greyabbey, County Down, the daughter of William Howard Clive Montgomery, OBE, of Rosemount House and of Greyabbey, and his second wife, Daphne Bridgeman. Her maternal grandfather was Geoffrey Bridgeman. She is a descendant of the 1st Viscount Montgomery of the Great Ards. She was educated at Rockport School, County Down, and Downe House School, Berkshire. She then studied drama at The Gaiety School of Acting in Dublin, Ireland. She graduated in 1994.

== Career ==
She won the Irish Times Best Actress Award for her role as the lead in Strindberg's Miss Julie. Other roles include Yelena in Chekov's Uncle Vanya, Ophelia in Hamlet and Katherina in The Taming of The Shrew. She has worked with contemporary playwrights such as Neil LaBute who directed her in Bash. She performed in the world premiere of The Reckoning, a two-hander with Jonathan Pryce, and also in the award winning Dinner, both in the West End. Flora has also recorded numerous radio plays, including Frederic Raphael's The Glittering Prizes.

In 2003, she was named as one of European film's Shooting Stars by European Film Promotion. Her notable TV appearances include The Bill as Emma, Urban Gothic, Pulling Moves and Midsomer Murders. She also acted in the 2001 film The Discovery of Heaven and in 2006 in Basic Instinct 2.

Montgomery also appeared in an episode of the medical series "Body Story 2" in 2001. In 2012, she had a role in the pilot episode of ITV's Endeavour.

== Personal life ==
On 30 August 2014, Montgomery married Søren Jessen, a Danish restaurateur, at Greyabbey on the Montgomery estate in Northern Ireland.

== Filmography ==
=== Film ===
Year	Film	Role	Notes
2000	When Brendan Met Trudy	Trudy	
2001	The Discovery of Heaven	Ada	
2002	The Last	Kitty Rose	Short film
2003	Goldfish Memory	Angie	
2003	Friday Night In	Cheryl	Short film
2005	Man to Man	Abigail McBride	
2006	Basic Instinct 2	Michelle Broadwin	
2006	Rabbit Fever	Georgia	
2006	After...	Addy	
2007	Speed Dating	Jennifer	
2008	The Daisy Chain	Orla Gannon	
2009	The Search	Laura	Short film
2011	Mother's Milk	Julia	
2011	The Waiting Room	Anna / Nurse	Short film
2024	Travel Socks	Sarah	Short film
TBA	Slammer	Ann Waterman	Completed but not yet released

=== Television ===
Year	Title	Role	Notes
1995	The Governor	Susan Fisher	Series 1; Episode 5
1997	Bugs	Joanne	Series 3; Episode 10, "Renegades"
1997	The Tale of Sweeney Todd	Young Woman in Waxworks	Television film
1997	The Perfect Blue	Film Student #2	Television film
1998	The Bill	Carol Chambers	Series 14; Episode 110: "Too Many Cooks"
1998	Heat of the Sun	Dorothy Michaeljohn	Mini-series; Episode 3: "The Sport of Kings"
1998	Mosley	Lady Alexandra Metcalfe ('Baba')	Episodes 1–4
1998	Wuthering Heights	Isabella Linton	Television film
1998	A Certain Justice	Octavia Aldridge	Mini-series; Episodes 1–3
1999	An Unsuitable Job for a Woman	Laura Fergusson	Series 2; Episode 2: "Playing God"
2000	Agatha Christie's Poirot	Flora Ackroyd	Series 7; Episode 1: "The Murder of Roger Ackroyd"
2000	Metropolis	Sophie Hamilton	Mini-series; Episodes 1–5
2000	Urban Gothic	Jane	Episode 12: "Turn On"
2000	The Bill	Emma Roberts	Series 16; Episodes 56–58: "Gentle Touch: Parts 1–3"
2001	Monarch of the Glen	Tanya Conway	Series 2; Episode 4
2001	Body Story 2	Phoebe	Series 2; Episode 6: "Allergy"
2003	Benedict Arnold: A Question of Honor	Peggy Shippen	Television film
2003	Ultimate Force	Suzi Brown	Series 2; Episode 3: "Wannabes"
2003	Hans Christian Andersen: My Life as a Fairytale	Jenny Lind	Television film
2004	Pulling Moves	Carol	Episodes 7–10
2004–2005	Murdoch Mysteries	Ettie Weston	Mini-series; Episodes 1–3
2005	Murphy's Law	Laura	Series 3; Episode 1: "The Goodbye Look"
2007	Midsomer Murders	Sophie Baxter	Series 10; Episode 3: "King's Crystal"
2007	Anner House	Ruth Maguire	Television film
2009	Father & Son	Anna Crowman	Mini-series; Episodes 1–4
2009	6th Irish Film & Television Awards	Herself - Award Presenter	Television Special
2011	The Family Firm	Patricia Hamilton	Television film
2012	Endeavour	Rosalind Stromming	Pilot episode
2013	Wodehouse in Exile	Leonora Cazalet	Television film
2014	Quirke	Isabel Galloway	Mini-series; Episode 3: "Elegy for April"
2014	Grantchester	Marion Taylor	Series 1; Episode 4
2018	A Very English Scandal	Diane Kelly	Mini-series; Episodes 2 & 3
2020	Life	Daisy	Mini-series; Episode 2
2021	Bloodlands	Supt. McCallister	Episode 1: "The Kidnapping"
2022	Murder in Provence	Isabelle de Bremont	Episode 2
2022	The Crown	Norma Major	Series 5; 6 episodes
2024	Professor T	Leah Vermorel	Series 3; Episode 6: "Attachment Issues"
2024	Showtrial	Grainne Westwood KC	Series 2; 3 episodes
2024	Dune: Prophecy	Truthsayer Vera	Series 1; Episodes 1 & 2: "The Hidden Hand" and "Two Wolves"
2025	Patience	Superintendent Zara Blackwood	Episode 6: "Pandora's Box"
2025	Hostage	Dr. Traci Lambert	3 episodes
2026-present	Dragon Striker	Goyen Noreen Sugoi	Recurring
