= Murdoch Mysteries =

Canadian television series

- Genre: Crime; Mystery; Period drama
- Based on: Detective Murdoch series by Maureen Jennings
- Developed by: R. B. Carney; Cal Coons; Alexandra Zarowny
- Starring: Yannick Bisson; Hélène Joy (seasons 1–17); Thomas Craig; Jonny Harris (seasons 1–18); Georgina Reilly (seasons 6–9); Paul Sun-Hyung Lee (seasons 18–present)
- Composer: Robert Carli
- Country of origin: Canada
- No. of seasons: 20
- No. of episodes: 337 (list of episodes)

Production
- Executive producers: Yannick Bisson; Scott Garvie; Noel Hedges; Peter Mitchell; Christina Jennings; Hélène Joy
- Producers: Jan Peter Meyboom; Julie Lacey; Laura Harbin; Shane Kinnear
- Production locations: Toronto; Oshawa; Belleville; Hamilton; St. John's; Ottawa; Cambridge; Drumheller; Guelph; Pitt Meadows; Dawson City; Bristol, England; Stratford; Kingston; Caledon
- Running time: 43–46 minutes
- Production companies: Shaftesbury Films; Rogers Media (seasons 1–5); UKTV

Original release
- Network: Citytv (seasons 1–5); CBC (seasons 6–present)
- Release: January 20, 2008 – present

Related
- Except the Dying; Poor Tom Is Cold; Under the Dragon's Tail; Frankie Drake Mysteries

Murdoch Mysteries is a Canadian television drama series that premiered on Citytv on January 20, 2008, and currently airs on CBC. The series is based on characters from the Detective Murdoch novels by Maureen Jennings. It stars Yannick Bisson as Detective William Murdoch, a police detective working in Station House Number 4 in Toronto, Ontario, starting in 1890, and including the late 19th and early 20th centuries. The series was titled The Artful Detective on the Ovation cable TV network in the United States, until season twelve.

== Synopsis ==
The series takes place in Toronto starting in 1895 and follows Detective William Murdoch (Yannick Bisson) of the Toronto Constabulary, who solves many of his cases using methods of detection that were unusual at the time. These methods include fingerprinting (referred to as "finger marks" in the series), blood testing, surveillance, and trace evidence.

Some episodes feature anachronistic technology whereby Murdoch sometimes uses the existing technology of his time to improvise a crude prototype of a technology that would be more readily recognizable to the show's 21st century audience. In one episode, for instance, he creates a primitive version of sonar to locate a sunken ship in Lake Ontario. In another, a foreign police officer has a photograph that Murdoch needs as evidence, so Murdoch has him send an early example of a fax via telegraph. This aspect of the show has been described as introducing elements of the steampunk genre of science fiction, although it is not a standard theme of all episodes.

Detective Murdoch is assisted by the three other main characters: Inspector Thomas Brackenreid (Thomas Craig), Doctor Julia Ogden (Hélène Joy), and the inexperienced but eager Constable George Crabtree (Jonny Harris), who aspires to be a mystery novel writer. Brackenreid, Murdoch's immediate superior, is a blunt and sceptical Yorkshireman with a fondness for whisky who prefers conventional methods of detection over Murdoch's eccentric methods, though he is typically pleased and proud when Murdoch is successful despite the odds. Crabtree is often unable to grasp the more advanced methods, but his enthusiasm and loyalty make him a good assistant. Like Crabtree, Dr. Ogden is a great supporter of Murdoch's methods. Her skill in pathology usually helps by revealing a great deal of useful evidence to aid Murdoch in solving cases. Throughout the series, Murdoch's growing infatuation with her and his inability to express his feelings provide a light subplot. Dr. Ogden says she is reluctant to marry Murdoch because she knows he wants children and was told that her earlier abortion makes her unable to conceive.

In the fifth season, after Dr. Ogden is married to Dr. Darcy Garland (a colleague she met in Buffalo), a new doctor is introduced, Doctor Emily Grace (Georgina Reilly). She and George Crabtree show some romantic interest in each other. Dr. Grace dates the brother of Darcy Garland for a while. Later, Dr. Grace moves to England after a few seasons to pursue the dreams of her deceased female lover.

Dr. Ogden becomes a surgeon and a psychiatrist. She starts and runs a hospital for women. The two coroners who follow her in succession are black women, Dr. Rebecca James and Dr. Violet Hart. This is inconsistent with the Canadian society of the time portrayed. Earlier in the series, a black private detective was denied a position in the Toronto constabulary because of his race and moved to the United States.

Other societal messaging includes an additional detective being placed in the office at the time when it was illegal to be homosexual. Station House 4 is tolerant of Detective Watts, and Inspector Brackenreid risks his own reputation by helping him return from New York City. Detective Watts takes an even greater role in scenes with Murdoch in season 18. In past seasons, he worked with the Constables Crabtree and Higgins. Crabtree was acting inspector a few times. As a guest character in the series Frankie Drake Mysteries George Crabtree appears as a retired constable who has become wealthy.

"Why is everybody singing?" is the title of season 17 episode 22, a musical episode. All of the actors sang and danced. The premise is that Murdoch hears voices as if they are singing while he is in a coma after being shot. Murdoch sings too. It is a possible condition in real life. Crabtree dances around the light pole in a nod to Gene Kelly's dance in Singing in the Rain. Crabtree's is the last face filling the screen at the end of the episode.

In season 18, three main characters that are the crucial of the story line are absent for much of the season. Dr. Ogden only appears in one two-part episode. Crabtree is absent for most of the season. Brackenreid is promoted to Chief Constable of Toronto, more absent, but returns to act as if he is in his old inspector role. Murdoch has been acting inspector in past episodes when Inspector Brackenreid had issues, but does not take the position when it is offered to him after years of being denied because of systemic prejudice against his being Catholic. Albert Choi (Paul Sun-Hyung Lee) replaces him as Inspector at Station House No 4, thereby becoming Murdoch's boss.

Dr. Ogden takes her daughter and moves to England to work in a hospital there where she would have more autonomy. This is uncharacteristic because she and Murdoch struggled so long to bear children. She says she knows William would not want to leave his career, even though transferring to England might have been possible at that time. In the 300th episode in two parts, William Murdoch visits England to celebrate their wedding anniversary with their daughter. Murdoch's illegitimate son from season 11 has been raised by his own mother, but has visited with the Murdoch family.

Real history is an important element in most episodes, and the plots, though fictitious, sometimes involve real people, such as Buffalo Bill Cody, Annie Oakley, H. G. Wells, Nikola Tesla, Wilfrid Laurier, Jack London, Arthur Conan Doyle, Queen Victoria, Theodore Roosevelt, Oliver Mowat, Orville and Wilbur Wright, Henry Ford, Sir Winston Churchill, Bat Masterson, Alexander Graham Bell, Emma Goldman, H. P. Lovecraft, Harry Houdini, Thomas Edison, Lucy Maud Montgomery and Helen Keller. In Season 12, Frank Lloyd Wright appears as the architect that Murdoch and Ogden hire to design their customized home, dubbed the Murdoch Mystery Mansion which incorporates many of the stylistic touches such as an open concept layout without doors or walls separating rooms, a low flat roof and stained glass windows with geometric designs evoking nature that Wright was known for.

Future events are often foreshadowed. For example, it is implied that secret British American government co-operation has produced a highly advanced aircraft similar to an airship, and Crabtree and Murdoch allude to the building of a secret government facility in Nevada and New Mexico "at Concession 51" (an allusion to Area 51). Characters also refer to actual inventions of the 19th century and extrapolate from them to future inventions such as microwave ovens, night-vision goggles, computers, the games Cluedo (marketed as Clue in the US) and "hangman", the toy Silly Putty, and a silencer for small arms.

Another underlying theme of the series involves the fact that Murdoch is a Catholic in what was at the time a predominantly Protestant city and the prejudices that he occasionally encounters as a result. Other subplots that overarch multiple episodes include the women's suffrage movement in Canada, a movement that was taking place during the time the series is set in, and the discrimination towards racial minorities in Toronto and same-sex relationships during that time period.

== History ==
The series has its origins in 2004 as a series of three made-for-TV movies, starring Peter Outerbridge in the lead role. Its original title at that time was Murder 19C: The Detective Murdoch Mysteries. The supporting cast included Keeley Hawes as Dr. Julia Ogden, Colm Meaney as Inspector Brackenreid and Matthew MacFadzean as Constable Crabtree.

In 2006, a thirteen episode series based on the novels was picked up, but there were questions about Outerbridge's continuing availability, since he was already starring in another series, ReGenesis. By 2007, Yannick Bisson became the lead in what was now called Murdoch Mysteries, with the other regular characters also recast.

The series debuted on Citytv on January 20, 2008. The program was well received, both by the audience and by the critics: in the summer of 2008, it was nominated for 14 Gemini Awards by the Academy of Canadian Cinema and Television. Critics were surprised, however, that Bisson was not among the nominees. The critics were also surprised in November when Murdoch Mysteries won only two Geminis.

Meanwhile, Murdoch Mysteries was renewed for four more seasons between 2009 and 2012. In 2010 the program, which had previously been filmed only in Canada, went to Bristol, England, to film an episode. One big fan of the show was Canadian Prime Minister Stephen Harper, who agreed to play a small role in one of that season's episodes. The episode in which he appeared, playing a "clueless cop who fails to recognize then prime minister Wilfrid Laurier", aired in late July 2011.

After Rogers Media decided not to continue the series beyond its fifth season, CBC Television picked up the show for its sixth season, which premiered in January 2013. The network has subsequently renewed the series repeatedly on a season-to-season basis. It has been one of the CBC's most highly rated programs, regularly watched by more than 1.4 million viewers as of January 2014. In the US season 12 aired on Ovation starting in April 2019, back under its original title of Murdoch Mysteries. Season 13 started in the US in December 2019, on Acorn TV.

On May 1, 2025, Murdoch Mysteries was renewed for a 19th season of 21 episodes.

== Episodes ==
| Season | Episodes | Originally released | | |
| Season | Episodes | First released | Last released | Network |
|---|---|---|---|---|
| TV films | 3 | May 13, 2004 | September 8, 2005 | Bravo |
| 1 | 13 | January 20, 2008 | April 13, 2008 | Citytv |
| 2 | 13 | February 10, 2009 | May 27, 2009 | Citytv |
| 3 | 13 | March 14, 2010 | June 13, 2010 | Citytv |
| 4 | 13 | June 7, 2011 | August 31, 2011 | Citytv |
| 5 | 13 | June 6, 2012 | August 28, 2012 | Citytv |
| 6 | 13 | January 7, 2013 | April 15, 2013 | CBC |
| 7 | 18 | September 30, 2013 | April 7, 2014 | CBC |
| 8 | 18 | October 6, 2014 | March 30, 2015 | CBC |
| 9 | 19 | October 5, 2015 | March 21, 2016 | CBC |
| 10 | 19 | October 10, 2016 | March 20, 2017 | CBC |
| 11 | 19 | September 25, 2017 | March 19, 2018 | CBC |
| 12 | 18 | September 24, 2018 | March 4, 2019 | CBC |
| 13 | 18 | September 16, 2019 | March 2, 2020 | CBC |
| 14 | 11 | January 4, 2021 | March 15, 2021 | CBC |
| 15 | 24 | September 13, 2021 | April 11, 2022 | CBC |
| 16 | 24 | September 12, 2022 | April 10, 2023 | CBC |
| 17 | 24 | October 2, 2023 | April 8, 2024 | CBC |
| 18 | 22 | September 30, 2024 | April 14, 2025 | CBC |
| 19 | 21 | October 6, 2025 | April 13, 2026 | CBC |
| 20 | TBA | October 5, 2026 | TBA | CBC |

== Guest stars ==
Murdoch Mysteries has been known for using stunt casting of famous actors or non-actor personalities in guest roles. Noted examples have included Stephen Harper, at the time the prime minister of Canada, in a small role as a police desk clerk; William Shatner portraying writer Mark Twain; a special Christmas episode which included appearances by Ed Asner, Brendan Coyle, Kelly Rowan and television news anchor Peter Mansbridge; an episode which featured David Onley, the lieutenant governor of Ontario at the time of production, appearing as his own forerunner Oliver Mowat; and two different episodes in which former Dragons' Den investors Arlene Dickinson and David Chilton guest-starred. Dickinson portrayed a business magnate named Miss Dickinson and Chilton a character named Mr. Chilton (aka the "Wealthy Barber"). In season 17, episode 15 Margaret Atwood has a cameo as Loren Quinnell, an amateur birder, which is an interest she shared with her late husband Graeme Gibson. Astronaut Chris Hadfield appears as an amateur "rocketman" in the episode Murdoch at the End of the World centreing around the arrival of Halley's Comet. He reassures listeners that the comet is harmless and should be enjoyed as a once-in-a-lifetime event.

In 2013, Murdoch Mysteries aired a fictional crossover with another CBC Television crime drama, Republic of Doyle. With the two shows set over 100 years apart, Allan Hawco appeared on the November 25, 2013, episode of Murdoch Mysteries as Jacob Doyle, a 19th-century ancestor of his regular character Jake Doyle, while Bisson appeared on the January 29, 2014, episode of Republic of Doyle as Detective Bill Murdoch, a 21st-century descendant of Detective William Murdoch. The end of the latter episode references the previous episode.

In 2017, Colin Mochrie appeared on Murdoch Mysteries as a hotel detective, after joking on Twitter that he was the only Canadian actor left who had never done a guest spot on the show.

== Production ==
Murdoch Mysteries is produced and developed by Shaftesbury Films in association with Citytv, ITV Studios Global Entertainment, UKTV and with the assistance of the Canadian Film or Video Production Tax Credit, the Ontario Film and Television Tax Credit, and the Canadian Television Fund. It features the distinctive theme music of the composer Robert Carli.

Prior to being picked up as a regular weekly series, three television movies, Except the Dying, Poor Tom Is Cold and Under the Dragon's Tail, aired on Bravo Canada in 2004. These films starred Peter Outerbridge as William Murdoch, Matthew MacFadzean as George Crabtree, Keeley Hawes as Julia Ogden, and Colm Meaney as Inspector Brackenreid.

Seasons one and two were filmed at the Toronto Film Studios facility on Eastern Avenue in Toronto. However, that facility was closed at the end of 2008, forcing the third season to be filmed elsewhere in Toronto, in the area near Kipling Subway to the west of the city.

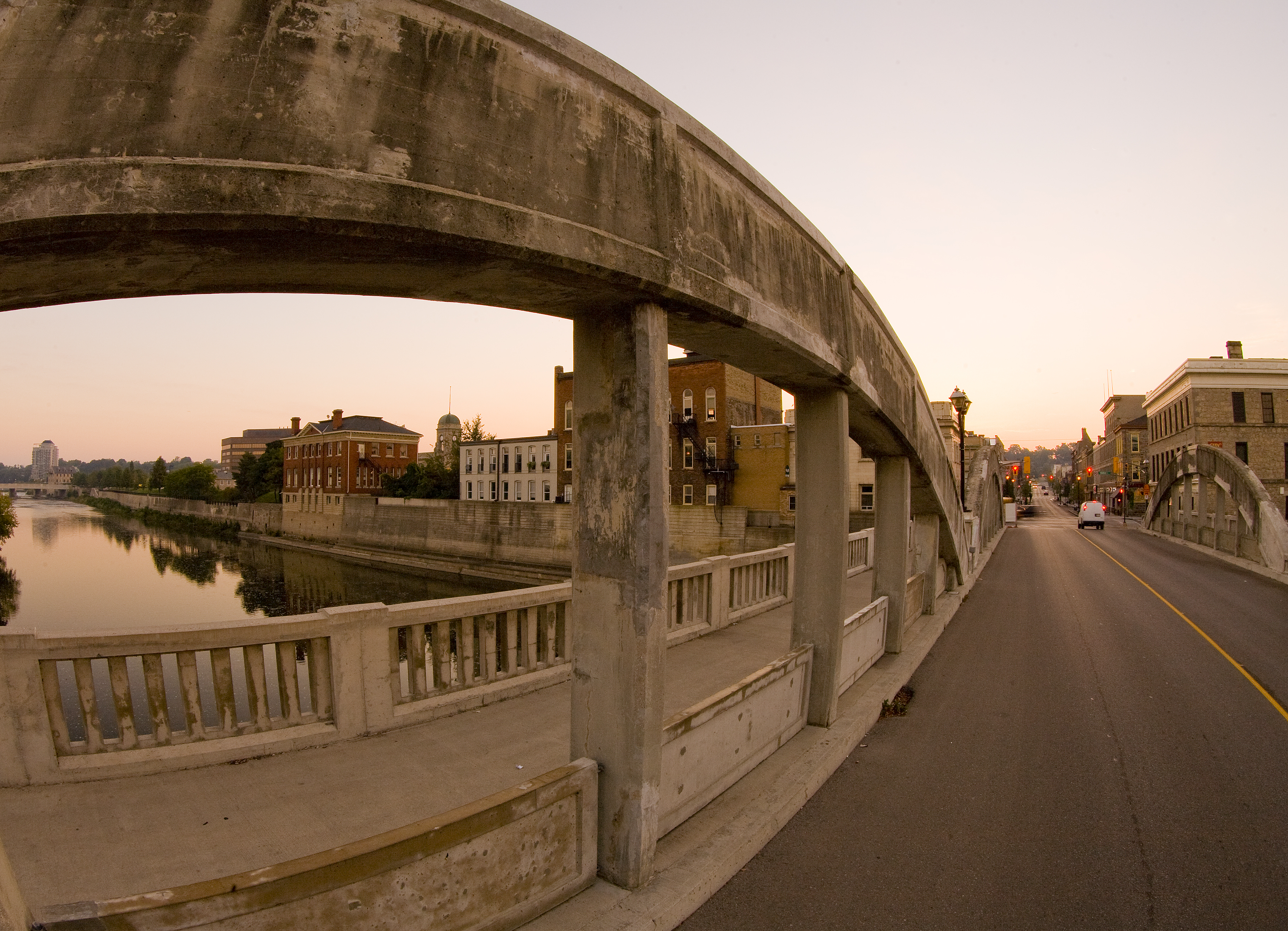
Galt's Main Street Bridge and its surrounding area have featured in exterior shots for Murdoch Mysteries.

For seasons one, two and three, filming locations included the Galt district of Cambridge, Ontario. Sidewalks and driveways were covered in earth, and in season one the Dobbie Mansion was used for about a week of indoor filming. Parts of the opening episode of season three were filmed in Bristol in England.

In August 2010 production on the fourth season began and continued through November 2010 with filming in Toronto and Hamilton. Canadian prime minister Stephen Harper filmed a cameo appearance as a constable in the fourth season on October 15, 2010, when he visited the set with his daughter.

Filming of season five began in July 2011 and included a visit to Dawson City in the Yukon. In September 2011, Rogers Media decided not to continue with Murdoch Mysteries beyond the fifth season. In response to the cancellation of the series Christina Jennings, executive producer and CEO of Shaftesbury Films said:

We've watched the show grow with the passionate support of audiences in Canada and around the world, and look forward to bringing the storyline to a fulfilling conclusion for fans during our final season.

Murdoch Mysteries was described as an "odd fit" for Citytv's schedule, which consists of more contemporary, urban hip, imported programming. Shaftesbury's British partners in the production of the series, broadcaster UKTV and the international distributor ITV Studios Global Entertainment, were both interested in additional seasons. Jennings approached Kirstine Stewart, executive vice-president of CBC's English services, about continuing the series, and she felt that "a home at CBC made absolute sense". Reports of the change of broadcasters and commitment for a sixth season appeared in the evening of November 15 with the press releases being issued on November 16. Production of the sixth season began in April 2012 to be ready for CBC in September 2012, but later the premiere for season six was changed to January 2013, and instead an encore of season five aired in September. Production of the 13th season started in May 2019.

On June 1, 2022, CBC renewed the show for a sixteenth season, which again consisted of 24 episodes.

The show's 17th season features a musical episode, directed by Laurie Lynd.

== Web series ==
In addition to the regular television series, several short-run web series have also been created under the Murdoch Mysteries banner.

In 2011, Murdoch Mysteries: The Curse of the Lost Pharaohs debuted on citytv.com, blending live action and animation to depict a storyline in which Crabtree, Murdoch, Dr. Ogden and Inspector Brackenreid were forced to battle mummies who were attempting to kill Queen Victoria. The storyline of the webseries was also integrated into the regular television series; within the main television plot Crabtree, as an aspiring writer, spent much of the season working on The Curse of the Lost Pharaohs as a fantasy novel manuscript. The Curse of the Lost Pharaohs garnered nominations for Best Digital Program: Fiction at the 2012 Emmy Awards, Cross-Platform Project, Fiction at the 2012 Banff World Media Festival and Cross-Platform Project, Fiction at the 1st Canadian Screen Awards.

The 2012 season web series The Murdoch Effect featured a time travel plotline in which William Murdoch suddenly found himself transported to the 21st century, and had to solve a case with eerie parallels to one he was investigating in his own timeline.

The 2013 series Nightmare on Queen Street featured an interactive story in which the viewer was called upon to solve the case by piecing together clues from each webisode. This series also garnered a nomination for Best Cross-Platform Project, Fiction at the 2nd Canadian Screen Awards.

The 2023 webseries Macy Murdoch stars Shailyn Pierre-Dixon as the titular Macy Murdoch, a 21st-century descendant of William Murdoch who is transported back in time to 1910.

== Broadcast ==
In Australia in 2025, Murdoch Mysteries runs on Channel 7two at 10:35 pm every Thursday night. This has been a common timeslot since 2017, with three episodes back to back commencing at 8.30 pm being another common timeslot. It previously aired on 13th Street.

The series airs in the United Kingdom on Alibi (formerly known as UKTV Drama).

In the United States, the series streams on Acorn TV, with new episodes being released on Mondays several months behind their airings in Canada. Reruns air on Ion Plus.

In France, the series is shown on France 3 and has been retitled Les Enquêtes de Murdoch (Murdoch Investigations).

In Greece, Murdoch Mysteries airs on ERT2 under the title Ντετέκτιβ Μέρντοχ (Detective Murdoch) on Saturday and Sunday at 9:00 pm

In Germany, older reruns air on One and AXN White under the title Murdoch Mysteries – Auf den Spuren mysteriöser Mordfälle ("On the trail of mysterious murder cases").

== Home video releases ==
Acorn Media has released ten seasons of Murdoch Mysteries on DVD and Blu-ray in North America and Australia.

ITV Studios Home Entertainment has released four seasons on DVD in the UK and has also released a box set of the seasons 1–3. Season 4 onward are available through Amazon UK, but in Region 1 format only. The first seven seasons are available for home viewing via streaming from Acorn.

=== DVDs ===
Home video releases on DVD
| Title | Region 1 | Region 2 | Region 4 | Extras | Discs |
|---|---|---|---|---|---|
| Murdoch Mysteries – Season One | June 16, 2009 | February 9, 2009 | June 26, 2009 | Interviews with the author and cast; Photograph gallery; Cast filmographies; Character biographies; Episode commentary | 4 |
| Murdoch Mysteries – Season Two | May 4, 2010 | February 15, 2010 | February 10, 2010 | Behind-the-scenes featurette; Photograph gallery; Cast filmographies; Character biographies | 4 |
| Murdoch Mysteries – Season Three | May 3, 2011 | August 15, 2011 | February 9, 2011 | A bonus alternate ending on "The Tesla Effect"; A 9-minute behind-the-scenes featurette | 4 |
| Murdoch Mysteries – Season Four | May 29, 2012 | May 23, 2011 | June 6, 2012 | Behind-the-scenes featurette; Alternate love letters | 4 |
| Murdoch Mysteries – Season Five | December 24, 2012 (direct from Acorn Media); March 5, 2013 (other retailers) | May 6, 2013 | August 1, 2012 | Season overview; Featurette for episodes 1, 5 & 6; Costume design featurette; Sound bites | 4 |
| Murdoch Mysteries – Season Six | November 26, 2013 | January 18, 2016 | August 7, 2013 | SDH subtitles | 4 |
| Murdoch Mysteries – Season Seven | October 18, 2014 | April 4, 2016 | May 14, 2014 | English subtitles; Bonus "Making Murdoch" featurette; Photo gallery | 5 |
| Murdoch Mysteries – Season Eight | August 4, 2015 | July 25, 2016 | May 6, 2015 | English subtitles; Bonus "Making Murdoch" featurette; A 100th Episode featurette; A behind-the-scenes photo gallery | 5 |
| Murdoch Mysteries – Season Nine | August 2, 2016 | March 20, 2017 | February 15, 2017 | Behind-the-scenes featurette; Photo gallery | 5 |
| Murdoch Mysteries – Season Ten | August 15, 2017 | June 12, 2017 | July 26, 2017 | Making Murdoch; What's new in season 10; Fan events; Favourite historical character; Favourite guest star; Funniest cast member; The constables of Station House No. 4; The spectacular stunts of Murdoch Mysteries | 5 |
| Murdoch Mysteries – Season Eleven | July 31, 2018 | May 14, 2018 | May 16, 2018 | A peek at the premiere; Remembering Constable Jackson; Bidding farewell; A historical heroine; The Brackenreid Boys; An episode in real time; Backenreid, the virtuoso; Tom Thompson; Jonny interviews Jay Reso; A different kind of criminal; Crabtree à la Carte | 5 |
| Murdoch Mysteries – Season Twelve | July 30, 2019 | May 20, 2019 | May 15, 2019 | Murdoch after-show featurette; Making Murdoch | 5 |
| Murdoch Mysteries – Season Thirteen | July 7, 2020 | May 18, 2020 | August 5, 2020 | n/a | 5 |
| Murdoch Mysteries – Season Fourteen | August 31, 2021 | May 17, 2021 | 2021 | n/a | 3 |
| Murdoch Mysteries – Season Fifteen | April 25, 2023 | July 11, 2022 | 2023 | n/a | 6 |
| Murdoch Mysteries – Season Sixteen | October 24, 2023 | October 24, 2023 | 2025 | n/a | 5 |
| Murdoch Mysteries – Season Seventeen | November 5, 2024 | November 4, 2024 | 2025 | n/a | 6 |
| Murdoch Mysteries – Season Eighteen | July 8, 2025 | July 14, 2025 | 2025 | n/a | 6 |

=== Blu-ray ===
Home video releases on Blu-ray
| Title | Region A | Region B | Extras | Discs |
|---|---|---|---|---|
| Murdoch Mysteries – Season One | April 17, 2012 | —N/a | Episode 1 commentary by stars Yannick Bisson and Jonny Harris, production designer Sandra Kybartas and executive producer Cal Coons; Interviews with the author and cast; Photo gallery; Character bios | 3 |
| Murdoch Mysteries – Season Two | March 5, 2013 | —N/a | Behind-the-scenes featurette; Character bios; Cast filmographies; Photo gallery | 3 |
| Murdoch Mysteries – Season Three | May 3, 2011 | —N/a | A bonus alternate ending on "The Tesla Effect"; A 9-minute behind-the-scenes featurette | 3 |
| Murdoch Mysteries – Season Four | May 29, 2012 | —N/a | Behind-the-scenes featurette; Alternate love letters | 3 |
| Murdoch Mysteries – Season Five | December 24, 2012 (direct from Acorn Media); March 5, 2013 (other retailers) | —N/a | Season overview; Featurette for episodes 1, 5 & 6; Costume design featurette; Sound bites | 3 |
| Murdoch Mysteries – Season Six | November 26, 2013 | —N/a | SDH subtitles | 3 |
| Murdoch Mysteries – Season Seven | October 18, 2014 | —N/a | English subtitles; Bonus "Making Murdoch" featurette; Photo gallery | 5 |
| Murdoch Mysteries – Season Eight | August 4, 2015 | —N/a | English subtitles; Bonus "Making Murdoch" featurette; A 100th episode featurette; A behind-the-scenes photo gallery | 4 |
| Murdoch Mysteries – Season Nine | August 2, 2016 | —N/a | Behind-the-scenes featurette; Photo gallery | 4 |
| Murdoch Mysteries – Season Ten | August 15, 2017 | —N/a | Making Murdoch; What's new in season 10; Fan events; Favourite historical character; Favourite guest star; Funniest cast member; The constables of Station House No. 4; The spectacular stunts of Murdoch Mysteries | 4 |
| Murdoch Mysteries – Season Eleven | July 31, 2018 | —N/a | A peek at the premiere; Remembering Constable Jackson; Bidding farewell; A Historical heroine; The Brackenreid boys; An episode in real time; Backenreid, the virtuoso; Tom Thompson; Jonny interviews Jay Reso; A different kind of criminal; Crabtree à la Carte | 4 |
| Murdoch Mysteries – Season Twelve | July 30, 2019 | —N/a | Murdoch after-show featurette; Making Murdoch | 4 |
| Murdoch Mysteries – Season Thirteen | July 7, 2020 | —N/a | n/a | 4 |
| Murdoch Mysteries – Season Fourteen | August 31, 2021 | August 31, 2021 | n/a | 3 |
| Murdoch Mysteries – Season Fifteen | TBD | —N/a | | |
| Murdoch Mysteries – Season Sixteen | October 24, 2023 | —N/a | n/a | 5 |
| Murdoch Mysteries – Season Seventeen | November 5, 2024 | —N/a | n/a | 6 |
| Murdoch Mysteries – Season Eighteen | July 8, 2025 | —N/a | n/a | 6 |

=== Season sets ===
Full-season sets released as home video
| Title | Region 1 | Region 2 | Region 4 | Discs |
|---|---|---|---|---|
| Murdoch Mysteries – Complete Series 1–3 | —N/a | August 30, 2010 | —N/a | 12 |
| Murdoch Mysteries: Series 1–5 Collection | —N/a | —N/a | November 7, 2012 | 20 |
| Murdoch Mysteries: Seasons 1–4 Collection (DVD & Blu-ray) | —N/a | March 5, 2013 | —N/a | 16 DVDs/12 Blu-ray |
| Murdoch Mysteries: Seasons 5–8 Collection (DVD & Blu-ray) | August 2, 2016 | —N/a | —N/a | 18 DVDs/15 Blu-ray |
| Murdoch Mysteries: Series 1–9 Collection (DVD) | —N/a | —N/a | September 11, 2016 | |
| Murdoch Mysteries: The Collection - Series 1–11 (includes the Christmas specials and TV movies) | —N/a | November 12, 2018 | —N/a | 53 |
| Murdoch Mysteries: Seasons 9–12 Collection (DVD & Blu-ray) | July 30, 2019 | —N/a | —N/a | 20 DVDs/16 Blu-ray |

=== TV movies ===
Television movies released as home video
| Title | Region 1 | Region 2 | Region 4 | Discs |
|---|---|---|---|---|
| The Murdoch Mysteries | May 26, 2015 | —N/a | —N/a | 3 |

=== Christmas special ===
Christmas specials released as home video
| Title | Region 1 | Region 2 | Region 4 | Extras | Discs |
|---|---|---|---|---|---|
| "Once Upon a Murdoch Christmas" | October 10, 2017 | —N/a | —N/a | Behind-the-scenes featurettes | 1 |
