= Maureen Jennings =

Canadian writer

Maureen Jennings OC
- Born: April 23, 1939 (age 87); Birmingham, United Kingdom
- Occupation: Writer
- Writing career
- Notable work: Murdoch Mysteries series

Maureen Ann Jennings OC (born 23 April 1939) is a British Canadian writer best known for the Detective Murdoch series, which formed the basis for the television show Murdoch Mysteries. She is credited as a creative consultant and occasionally writer for the show.

== Biography ==
Maureen Jennings was born and grew up in Birmingham, England. She attended Saltley Grammar School. Jennings grew up knowing little of her father, who was killed in action during World War II. Jennings immigrated to Canada with her mother when she was seventeen. She earned a BA in psychology and philosophy at Assumption University in Windsor and an MA in English literature at the University of Toronto. Jennings initially taught in the English department at Ryerson Polytechnic Institute and later practiced as a psychotherapist. Her first successful writing was stage plays.

Jennings is best known as the author of the Detective Murdoch Series, which has been turned into a television series. As of 2019, her most recent novel, Heat Wave, introduces Murdoch's son as a police detective in 1936.

The television drama Bomb Girls was based on a concept Jennings developed.

She lives in Toronto.

== Honours and recognition ==
In 2011, Jennings received the Grant Allen Award for her ongoing contributions to Canadian crime fiction. In 2024, she was given the Grand Master Award by the Crime Writers of Canada, which is given "to recognize a Canadian crime writer with a substantial body of work who has garnered national and international recognition."

Jennings was appointed to the Order of Canada in 2024, with the rank of Officer.

== Bibliography ==
=== Fiction ===
==== William Murdoch series ====
John Wilson Murray, who was appointed as Ontario's first government detective in 1875, "was an important inspiration" for Jennings and led to the development of the character William Murdoch.

1. Except the Dying (1997)
2. Under the Dragon's Tail (1998)
3. Poor Tom Is Cold (2001)
4. Let Loose the Dogs (2003)
5. Night's Child (2005)
6. Vices of My Blood (2006)
7. A Journeyman to Grief (2007)
8. Let Darkness Bury the Dead (2017)

==== Christine Morris series ====
1. Does Your Mother Know? (2006)
2. The K Handshape (2008)

==== Tom Tyler series ====
1. Season of Darkness (2011)
2. Beware This Boy (2012)
3. No Known Grave (2014)
4. Dead Ground in Between (2016)

==== Charlotte Frayne series ====
1. Heat Wave (2019)
2. November Rain (2020)
3. Cold Snap (2022)
4. March Roars (2024)

=== Non-fiction ===
1. The Map of Your Mind: Journeys Into Creative Expression (2001)
