= List of Murdoch Mysteries characters =

Murdoch Mysteries is a Canadian drama television series produced by Shaftesbury Films that premièred in January 2008 and was broadcast on Citytv in Canada and on Alibi in the UK. It was picked up by CBC Television for its sixth season. The show follows the titular character William Murdoch, a police detective working in Toronto, Ontario, through the turn of the 19th century into the 20th, who makes use of what was, in the late Victorian era, the latest in forensic science to solve crimes. The show was developed for television by Cal Coons and Alexandra Zarowny based on the characters in the Detective Murdoch series of novels written by Maureen Jennings.

== Characters ==
Actor	Character	Seasons																			
Actor	Character	1	2	3	4	5	6	7	8	9	10	11	12	13	14	15	16	17	18	19	20
Yannick Bisson	Detective William Murdoch	Main	Main	Main	Main	Main	Main	Main	Main	Main	Main	Main	Main	Main	Main	Main	Main	Main	Main	Main	Main
Hélène Joy	Dr. Julia Ogden	Main	Main	Main	Main	Main	Main	Main	Main	Main	Main	Main	Main	Main	Main	Main	Main	Main	Guest		
Thomas Craig	Inspector (later Chief Constable) Thomas Brackenreid	Main	Main	Main	Main	Main	Main	Main	Main	Main	Main	Main	Main	Main	Main	Main	Main	Main	Main	Main	Main
Jonny Harris	Constable George Crabtree	Main	Main	Main	Main	Main	Main	Main	Main	Main	Main	Main	Main	Main	Main	Main	Main	Main	Main	Guest	
Georgina Reilly	Dr. Emily Grace					Recurring	Recurring	Main	Main	Main											
Paul Sun-Hyung Lee	Inspector Albert Choi																		Main	Main	Main
Daniel Maslany	Detective Llewellyn Watts										Recurring	Recurring	Recurring	Recurring	Recurring	Recurring	Recurring	Recurring	Recurring	Recurring	Recurring
Lachlan Murdoch	Constable Henry Higgins	Recurring	Recurring	Recurring	Recurring	Recurring	Recurring	Recurring	Recurring	Recurring	Recurring	Recurring	Recurring	Recurring	Recurring	Recurring	Recurring	Recurring	Recurring	Recurring	Recurring
Peter Keleghan	Terrence Meyers	Recurring	Recurring	Recurring	Recurring	Recurring	Recurring	Recurring	Recurring	Recurring	Recurring	Recurring	Recurring	Recurring	Recurring	Recurring	Recurring	Recurring	Recurring	Recurring	
Arwen Humphreys	Margaret Brackenreid	Recurring	Recurring	Recurring	Recurring	Recurring	Recurring	Recurring	Recurring	Recurring	Recurring	Recurring	Recurring	Recurring	Recurring	Recurring	Recurring	Recurring	Recurring	Recurring	Recurring
Mouna Traoré	Rebecca James									Recurring	Recurring	Recurring									
Peter Stebbings	James Pendrick			Recurring		Recurring	Recurring	Recurring		Recurring	Recurring	Recurring		Recurring	Recurring	Recurring	Recurring		Guest		
Shanice Banton	Violet Hart											Recurring	Recurring	Recurring	Recurring	Recurring	Recurring	Recurring	Recurring	Recurring	Recurring
Michael Seater	James Gillies		Guest			Guest	Recurring	Recurring			Guest							Guest		Guest	
Daiva Johnston	Eva Pearce						Guest	Guest	Guest	Guest	Recurring										
Cyrus Lane	Roger Newsome							Recurring	Recurring	Recurring	Recurring										
Cyrus Lane	Rupert Newsome											Recurring	Recurring	Recurring	Recurring	Recurring	Recurring			Guest	
Kristian Bruun	Augustus "Gus" Jackson					Recurring	Recurring	Recurring	Recurring	Recurring	Recurring	Guest									
Erin Agostino	Nina Bloom									Guest	Recurring	Recurring					Guest				
Clare McConnell	Effie Newsome												Recurring	Recurring	Recurring	Recurring	Recurring	Recurring	Recurring	Recurring	Recurring
John Fleming (Season 1)	John Brackenreid	Guest					Recurring	Recurring	Recurring	Recurring	Recurring	Recurring	Recurring	Recurring		Recurring					
Charles Vandervaart (Season 6–)	John Brackenreid	Guest					Recurring	Recurring	Recurring	Recurring	Recurring	Recurring	Recurring	Recurring		Recurring					
Nigel Bennett	Percival Giles				Guest	Recurring	Recurring		Recurring	Recurring				Guest		Guest					
Siobhan Murphy	Ruth Newsome										Recurring	Recurring	Recurring	Recurring	Recurring	Recurring			Guest	Guest	
Sarah Swire	Amelia Ernst													Recurring		Recurring					
Sarah Swire	Dorothy Ernst														Recurring	Recurring		Guest			
Alex Paxton-Beesley	Winifred "Freddie" Pink									Recurring	Recurring					Recurring					
Giacomo Gianniotti	Leslie Garland							Recurring	Guest								Guest				
Brian Paul	Sir Wilfrid Laurier (Later Prime Minister)				Guest					Guest				Guest			Guest				
Colin Mochrie	Ralph Fellows											Recurring	Recurring	Recurring	Recurring	Recurring		Guest		Guest	
Matthew Bennett	Allen Clegg				Recurring	Recurring	Recurring	Recurring		Recurring		Recurring		Recurring			Recurring				
Patrick McKenna	Inspector Hamish Slorach			Guest					Recurring				Recurring	Recurring						Guest	
John Tench	Alexander Graham Bell					Recurring						Guest		Guest			Guest				
Dmitry Chepovetsky	Nikola Tesla	Guest		Guest									Guest	Guest							
Christine Horne	Svetlana Tsiolkovsky									Guest				Guest	Guest				Guest		
Bea Santos	Louise Cherry										Recurring	Recurring	Recurring	Recurring	Recurring	Recurring	Recurring	Recurring	Recurring	Recurring	Recurring
Kira Guloien	Lucinda Helmsworthy-Newsome													Recurring	Recurring	Recurring				Guest	
Shailene Garnett	Nomi Johnston												Recurring	Recurring	Recurring						
James Graham	Arthur Carmichael												Recurring		Recurring	Recurring	Recurring	Guest			
Jesse LaVercombe	Jack Walker													Recurring	Recurring	Recurring	Recurring				
Jonelle Gunderson	Goldie Huckabee													Recurring	Recurring						
Samantha Walkes	Cassiopeia Bright															Recurring	Recurring	Recurring			
Mark Taylor	Isaiah Buchanan															Recurring	Recurring	Recurring	Recurring		
Kataem O'Connor	Constable Teddy Roberts																		Recurring	Recurring	Recurring
Kenzie Delo	Constable Tucker																Recurring	Recurring	Recurring		
Neil Crone	Crown Attorney Allister Gordon						Guest		Recurring	Recurring						Recurring	Recurring	Recurring	Recurring		
Stephanie Belding	Nurse Kate Sullivan												Recurring	Recurring		Recurring	Recurring	Recurring			
James McGowan	Dr. Forbes												Recurring	Recurring		Recurring		Guest			
Nathan Hoppe	Constable McNabb										Recurring	Guest	Recurring		Recurring	Recurring	Guest	Recurring	Recurring		
Craig Brown	Eddie Crawford								Guest	Guest		Recurring	Recurring					Recurring			
Lucy Hill	Iona Berger																		Recurring	Recurring	Recurring

== Main ==
=== William Henry Murdoch ===
William Murdoch
- First appearance: "Except the Dying"
- Portrayed by: Peter Outerbridge (TV movies); Yannick Bisson (TV series)

In-universe information
- Title(s): Detective, Acting Inspector
- Occupation: Police officer, gold miner

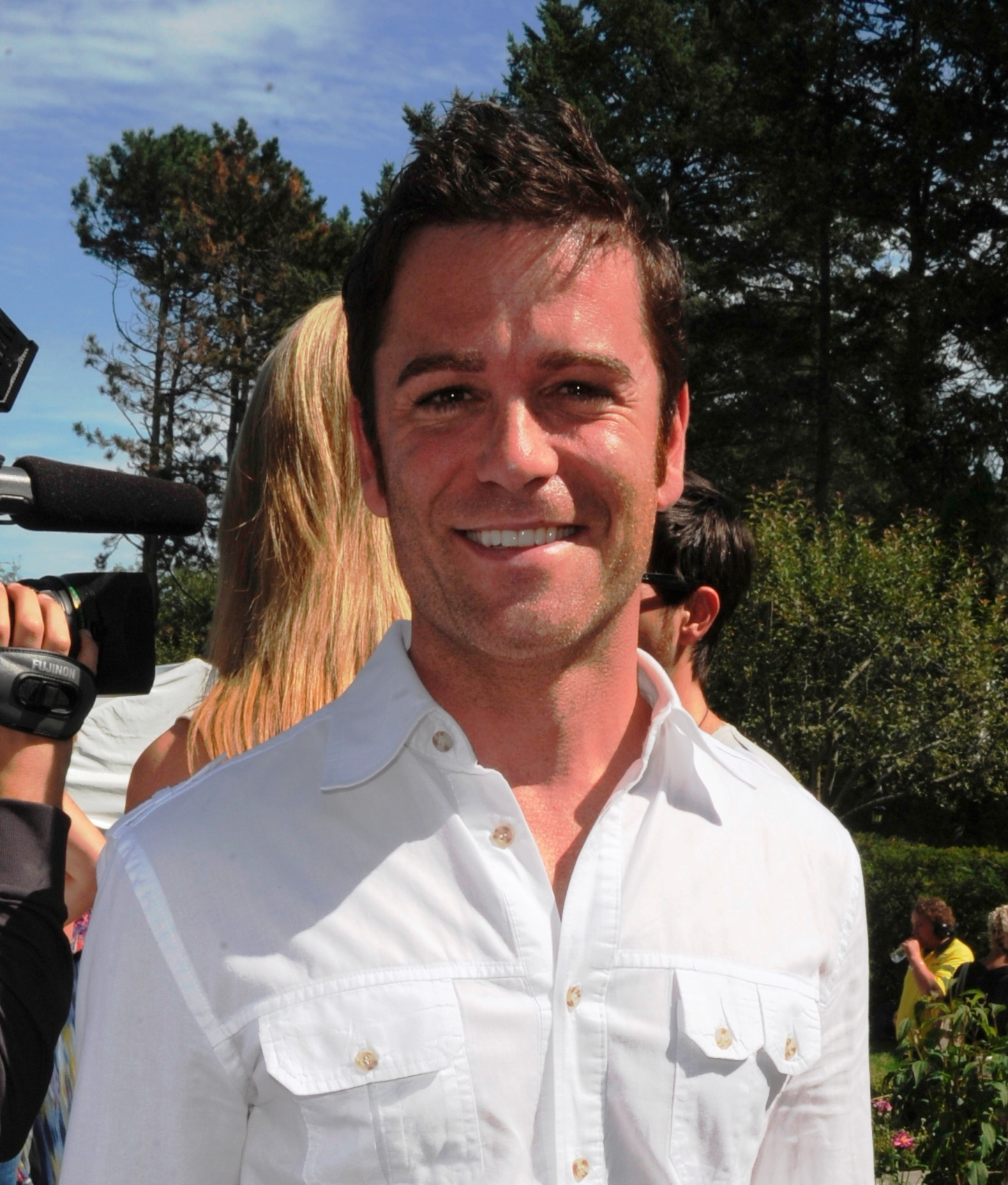
Yannick Bisson, the actor who plays Murdoch

Detective Murdoch, who is portrayed by Peter Outerbridge in the TV movies and by Yannick Bisson in the series, is an intelligent, observant detective who uses unusual (for the time) techniques such as blood testing and fingerprinting. It is revealed he comes from Nova Scotia, is a devout Roman Catholic who was educated by the Jesuits and is fluent in French. In one episode, it is revealed that he believes that his father beat his mother and may have indirectly caused her death, although this was proven incorrect. Following that incident, he was taken to live in an orphanage for a time.

Murdoch is also a polymath: Although very logical, sceptical, observant, scientific and clear-headed with a photographic memory (possibly Hyperthymesia) and working memory, these become an issue when he needs to connect with people on an emotional level, something he finds difficult. Often his unusual techniques and unbiased opinions of people lead him to clash with Brackenreid (even though they work together well). In season 9, episode 11, Murdoch takes up golf and does quite well till a machine he invents ruins his "swing". Julia plays well and Murdoch is told all he has to do is empty his mind to again play well. This is something he cannot do and he ends up angrily throwing his clubs in the lake, one by one.

Murdoch often consults on cases with Dr. Julia Ogden, with whom he is infatuated, although he did not attempt a relationship with her until the first half of season 2. As the season progressed, an argument over beliefs and past decisions made by Ogden split up the couple for a time, during which time Murdoch pursued a relationship with Enid Jones. However, he and Ogden rekindled their relationship during the season 2 finale on the advice of his half-brother (see below), and it becomes "public" (despite everyone already knowing about it) in the first episode of season 3. Ogden and Murdoch become engaged in the finale of season 7 and are married in episode 4 of season 8.

In the season 2 finale, it is revealed his father had another son, Jasper Linney (of whom Murdoch knew nothing) out of wedlock, before marrying Murdoch's mother. Jasper is a sergeant in the North-West Mounted Police and his mannerisms, interests and investigative techniques are similar to those of Murdoch's own (mentioned above), and the two prove successful in working together to solve a gold mining scam case. In the season 4 episode "Voices", it is revealed that Murdoch has a younger sister, Susannah, who is a nun living in Toronto briefly before returning to her convent in Montreal when it is revealed she is terminally ill. Their conversations reveal that they had an aunt, whose home he left at seventeen, to work at a logging camp. This episode also mentions that Murdoch's father was still alive two years prior and lives in Western Canada.

In season 1, episode 4, it is revealed that Murdoch once had a fiancée, Liza Milner; she died a year prior of consumption.

In season 9, episode 10, "Raised on Robbery", he and Julia have adopted a son, Roland, the orphaned son of the bank-robber couple; however, in episode 14, "Wild Child", when they find out that the couple were not Roland's biological parents, Murdoch and Julia make the heart-breaking decision to give up Roland and reunite him with his real father (the mother having died in childbirth.) Murdoch later learns he has a son, Harry, from his relationship with Anna Fulford. In season 15, William and Julia welcome a daughter of their own, named Susannah after William's late sister.

In a crossover with fellow CBC show Republic of Doyle, called "If the Shoe Fits", a modern-day version of Murdoch appears in the form of "Bill Murdoch", who is the great-great-great-grandson of William.

Season	Episodes																							
Season	1	2	3	4	5	6	7	8	9	10	11	12	13	14	15	16	17	18	19	20	21	22	23	24
1	Appears																							
2	Appears																							
3	Appears																							
4	Appears																							
5	Appears																							
6	Appears																							
7	Appears																							
8	Appears																							
9	Appears																							
10	Appears																							
11	Appears																							
12	Appears																							
13	Appears																							
14	Appears																							
15	Appears																							
16	Appears																							
17	Appears																							
18	Appears																							
19	Appears																							

=== Thomas Charles Brackenreid ===
Thomas Charles Brackenreid
- First appearance: "Except the Dying"
- Portrayed by: Colm Meaney (TV movies); Thomas Craig (TV series)

In-universe information
- Title(s): Inspector, Chief Constable
- Occupation: Police officer

Inspector (later Chief Constable) Thomas Brackenreid (portrayed by Colm Meaney in the TV movies and in the TV series by Thomas Craig) is a middle aged married man, fond of the theatre and a good drink. He is the head of the stationhouse and does most of the interrogating, often forming opinions of a suspect because of personal impressions or their social standing. Quick to anger and tenacious, with a sarcastic sense of humour, he is better at traditional "coppering" and is very proud of his job and what he feels is his duty to protect the city.

While he often disagrees with Murdoch's methods, he uses them when he feels they have merit. He has little time for Crabtree until the second half of the fifth season where he takes him directly under his wing and actually seems to care deeply for him. He is shown to care for Murdoch and knows his mannerisms well enough to know when he is pining and advises him to do something about it.

Throughout the second season Brackenreid is forced to hide his drinking habits from his wife, who has joined the temperance movement.

In the third season, it is revealed that Brackenreid is a Freemason, as is Constable Crabtree (who happens to be of higher rank, as he can watch his language, etc., better than Brackenreid can).

At the end of the seventh season Brackenreid suffered a severe beating from a gang of thugs that was controlling the harbour. The first two episodes of season eight detailed that, although he had physically recovered, he was initially adamant about leaving his job, fearing that his family might be endangered. After being convinced by his wife that being a policeman was his life, he began a lone and almost maniacal search for the person responsible for the attack and other crimes, proving willing to eschew the "rules" to achieve his objective. Although he came close to killing the culprit, in the end he abided by the law he had served for years and returned to his job as Inspector.

At the end of Season 17 Brackenreid is appointed as the new Chief Constable.

Brackenreid paints as a hobby. Although his colleagues and family don't always appreciate his work. His style greatly resembles Canadian painter Tom Thomson.

Brackenreid is from Yorkshire, England and has two sons with his wife Margaret, John and Bobby. John, the elder son, would become a Constable under his father at Station House 4 in season 11. Before he became a policeman, Brackenreid served in the British Army and fought in Afghanistan. He is a supporter of Sheffield Wednesday Football Club.

In season 12, "Secrets and Lies", he discovers that he has an adult daughter, named Nomi Johnson (played by Shailene Garnett), as the result of a relationship with a Black woman before he married Margaret. He loves Nomi and feels she is part of his family, but initially is reluctant to admit to being her father due to her mixed race. Eventually he publicly acknowledges her in Season 14, "The .38 Murdoch Special".

Season	Episodes																							
Season	1	2	3	4	5	6	7	8	9	10	11	12	13	14	15	16	17	18	19	20	21	22	23	24
1	Appears																							
2	Appears																							
3	Appears																							
4	Appears																							
5	Appears																							
6	Appears																							
7	Appears																							
8	Appears																							
9	Appears																							
10	Appears		X	Appears	X	Appears	X		Appears		X			Appears										
11	Appears																							
12	Appears	X	Appears								X		Appears											
13	Appears																							
14	Appears																							
15	Appears																							
16	Appears																							
17	Appears							X	Appears				X	Appears				X		Appears	X	Appears		X
18	Appears		X	Appears	X	Appears			X	Appears	X		Appears	X	Appears				X		Appears			
19	Appears			X	Appears			X	Appears				X	Appears				X	Appears					

=== Dr. Julia Ogden ===
Julia Ogden
- Murdoch Mysteries character
- First appearance: "Except the Dying"
- Created by: Maureen Jennings
- Portrayed by: Keeley Hawes (TV movies); Hélène Joy (TV series)

In-universe information
- Gender: Female
- Title: Doctor
- Occupation: Pathologist, general practitioner, psychiatrist

Doctor Ogden, who is portrayed by Keeley Hawes in the TV movies and by Hélène Joy in the TV series, attended Bishop's University and is a skilled pathologist and medical examiner. (In 1894, a woman did graduate from Bishop's University and become a skilled pathologist: Dr. Maude Abbott.) However, it is later (episode 11.05) said that she studied under Dr. William Osler at McGill University (McGill University did not admit women to the Faculty of Medicine until 1918.) The first of two sisters, Dr. Ogden was a tomboy in her youth and has a criminal record for skinny dipping with some university colleagues (episode 2.04). Her mother is dead, and she has a strained relationship with her father. She enjoys tennis, reading, cycling and attending the theatre. Through her family connections, she is quite well known in Toronto's upper class society (episode 1.08). Dr. Ogden is often consulted on cases by Murdoch and is able to provide valuable insights into many cases. They, along with Constable Crabtree, enjoy the intellectual puzzles that many murder mysteries present.

In the first season, she and Murdoch begin a tentative romantic relationship. In episode 2.06, Dr. Ogden tells Murdoch that she became pregnant when in university and terminated it. (Abortion in Canada was illegal during 1869–1969.) As Murdoch struggles to come to terms with this knowledge, Ogden decides to end their relationship, believing that, due to his Catholicism, he will never accept what she did or that she still feels it was the right decision. Their relationship is awkward until the end of the final episode of season 2 when Dr. Ogden agrees to discuss restarting the relationship.

At the end of Season 3, she leaves the Constabulary to go work in a children's hospital in Buffalo, New York. It is revealed that she cannot give birth to a child due to the previous abortion, and for this reason she decides to terminate her relationship with Murdoch. Murdoch tries to stop her leaving and intends to propose to her despite knowing about her condition, but arrives late at the train station. (In a daydream that he has about proposing, he intends to tell her that he does want a family, but that they can adopt. However, he never has this conversation with her in real life, and she leaves Toronto not knowing about his intentions for either marriage or family.) Dr. Ogden does not return to work in the morgue at the start of season 4, but Murdoch writes to her to help solve a case. She does not appear in episode 2, but does appear in episode 3 ("Buffalo Shuffle"), where Yannick Bisson makes his directing debut. Murdoch brings the engagement ring with the intention of proposing, but Dr. Ogden reveals that she is already engaged to a doctor working at the children's hospital in Buffalo. She returns to her old position in Toronto several episodes later. Her fiancé takes a position at a Toronto hospital to be with her. In the last episode Julia marries Dr. Darcy Garland, despite her affection for Murdoch.

At the beginning of season 5 ("Back and to the Left), however, she terminates her employment in the City Morgue and starts her own private practice in Toronto, leaving the work to her protégée, Dr. Emily Grace. Julia states that with her feelings towards Murdoch maintaining their professional relationship would jeopardize her marriage. Later on in the series she actively participates in a birth-control campaign, which complicates her husband's social position and even leads to her arrest. At the end of the season, she and Darcy separate. In season 6, Julia is working as a psychiatrist, often assisting Murdoch with his cases. She is actively trying to divorce Darcy and is framed for his murder at the end of the season, though Murdoch uncovers the real killer and clears her name barely in time to prevent her execution by hanging. The trauma of her experience and guilt feelings cause her to withdraw from Murdoch at the season 6 finale; but, in season 7, their relationship seems to be back on track, and they become engaged in the finale. They are married in the fourth episode of season 8.

In season 9, episode 10, "Raised on Robbery", she and William briefly adopted a son, Roland, the orphaned son of the bank-robber couple. When Julia discovers the child's actual father is still alive, they reluctantly return Roland to his father. However, the experience with Roland encourages William and Julia to seriously consider adopting a child of their own. In season 11, episode 4 ("The Canadian Patient"), Julia meets a woman conducting research into fertility treatments, and offers herself as a potential test subject. In episode 11 ("Biffers and Blockers"), Julia reveals to William that the treatments have worked and she is pregnant. Julia suffers a miscarriage in the fourth month of her pregnancy (season 11, episode 17, "Shadows are Falling"). She later becomes pregnant again and gives birth to a daughter, Susannah, named after Murdoch's late sister. Dr. Ogden's pregnancy in the series coincided with Hélène Joy's own pregnancy and was written into the show.

Julia's father, Dr. Lionel Ogden, died in the season 7 finale. She has a younger sister, Ruby Ogden, who is a minor character in the series and a journalist, who often travels the world.

Season	Episodes																							
Season	1	2	3	4	5	6	7	8	9	10	11	12	13	14	15	16	17	18	19	20	21	22	23	24
1	Appears																							
2	Appears																							
3	Appears																							
4	Appears	X	Appears																					
5	Appears		X				Appears		X		Appears	X	Appears											
6	Appears																							
7	Appears																							
8	Appears						X	Appears																
9	Appears																							
10	Appears																							
11	Appears																							
12	Appears																							
13	Appears		X		Appears																			
14	Appears																							
15	Appears																							
16	Appears																							
17	Appears														X	Appears					X	Appears		
18	X											Appears		X										
19	X																							

=== Constable George Crabtree ===
George Crabtree
- First appearance: "Except the Dying"
- Last appearance: "Diamonds in the Sand"
- Portrayed by: Matthew MacFadzean (TV movies); Jonny Harris (TV series)

In-universe information
- Title(s): Constable 1st Class, Constable 3rd Class, Deputy Detective, Inspector
- Occupation: Police officer

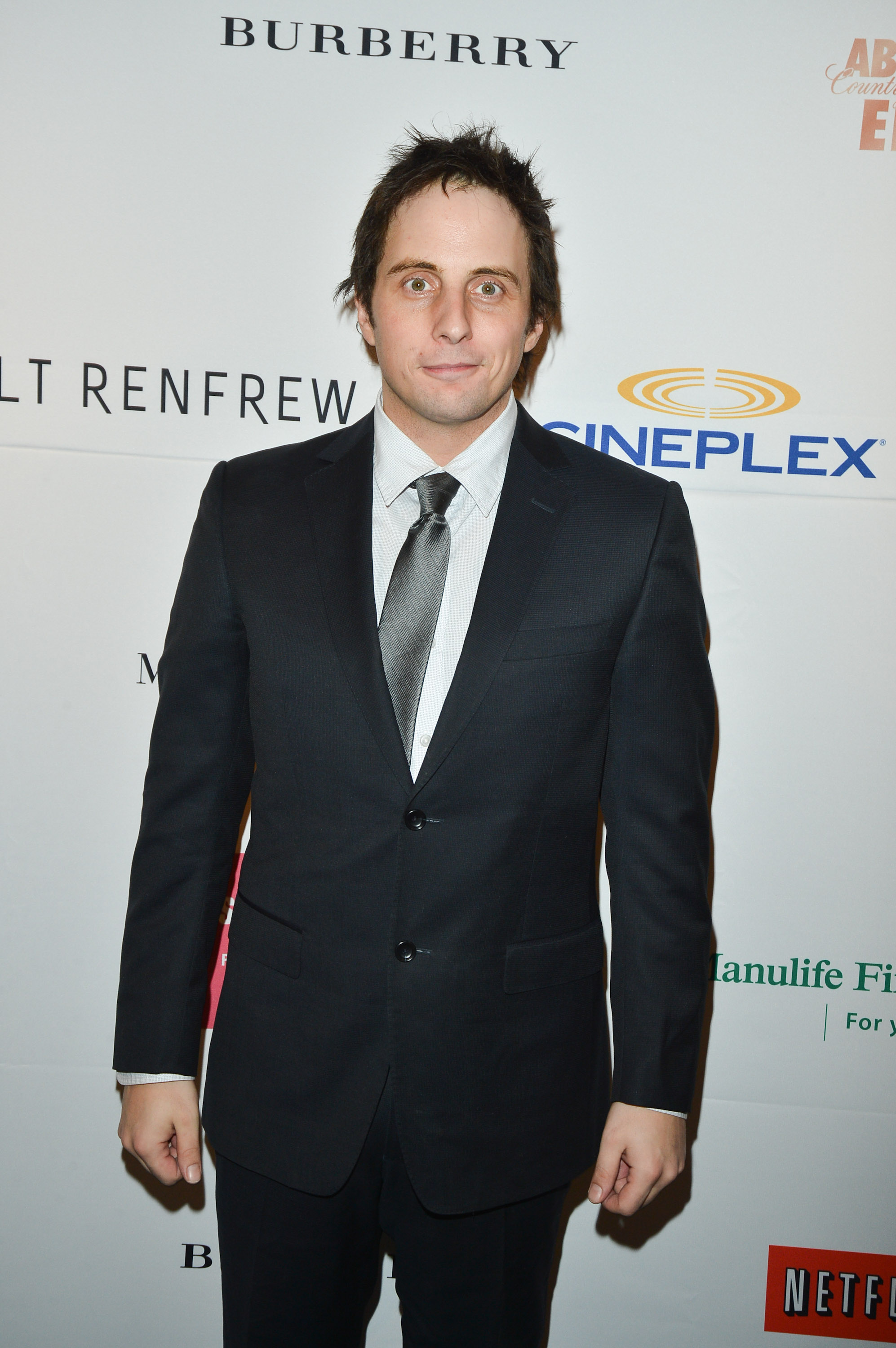
Jonny Harris

Murdoch's assistant, Constable Crabtree, is portrayed by Matthew MacFadzean in the TV movies and by Jonny Harris in the TV series. Although inexperienced at first and often comically naive, Crabtree frequently provides useful insights into cases and does much of the forensic legwork collecting evidence.

In early seasons, Crabtree is eager, but has yet to master Murdoch's more advanced scientific skills. He is very loyal to Murdoch, willing to threaten one of Ogden's suitors when Murdoch asked him to investigate him; he also knows Murdoch's mannerisms rather well. While Brackenreid initially regards him as an idiot, over time, Crabtree and some of the other constables prove adept at learning Murdoch's methods (e.g. photography) and eventually gains Brackenreid's respect and the possibility of promotion to detective.

Crabtree dates a number of women over the years, but the relationships tend to be doomed by circumstances. At the end of season 8 and the start of season 9, he proposes to Edna Brooks, but she learns she is not a widow — and then her husband is murdered. Fearing that Edna is guilty, Crabtree protects her by allowing himself to be prosecuted and convicted, via Nolo Contendere. Consequently, he is not promoted, but demoted to Constable Third Class, after Murdoch finds the real killer.

Crabtree often has ideas for commercial uses for Murdoch's inventions. Murdoch usually dismisses them as absurd, but they often prefigure real successful products. Crabtree also aspires to be a mystery novelist. His first novel, The Curse of the Pharaohs, is published in season 5. (Concurrently with that season, Curse of the Lost Pharaohs also aired on Citytv.com as a mixed live action/animation web series dramatizing the plot of Crabtree's manuscript.)

Crabtree revealed in one episode ("Big Murderer on Campus") that he did not know who his biological mother was and was left on the doorstep of a church and taken in by the family there. He was later re-united with his mother at the end of the episode after taking part in a plan to uncover the murderer of a professor; he learns that she was forced to leave him on the church's doorstop after her husband died and she couldn't provide for their son. Crabtree also frequently refers to his many "Aunts", each of whom seems to be named after a variety of flower. In the season 7 episode "Republic of Murdoch", it is revealed that these Aunts are, or at one time have been, prostitutes who live in a large house rented to them by the Reverend who became Crabtree's guardian after he was abandoned. Crabtree, while having been born in Toronto, was raised in Newfoundland.

In season 3, it is revealed that Crabtree is a Freemason, along with Brackenreid, and turns out to be of higher rank than the inspector, as Brackenreid cannot refrain from his use of bad language, etc.

Crabtree also has a difficult time with a flighty socialite named Roger Newsome, whom he has numerous dealings with, to his irritation. His deepest cause for this enmity was when Newsome was assisting Crabtree on a case and at one point Crabtree was being attacked with deadly intent by a criminal. Rather than do anything to assist his police companion in mortal peril, Newsome abandoned him in blatant cowardice, and Crabtree required assistance from others. Newsome never adequately apologized for his failure and would meet the unforgiving Crabtree on numerous other occasions. However, when Newsome was murdered by a sniper to silence his testimony for a murder trial in the episode, "Weekend at Murdoch's", Crabtree was able to spare a bit of politeness for him under the circumstances. In the show's 16th season, he marries Roger Newsome's cousin Effie (Clare McConnell). At the start of the 19th season, he leaves Toronto for a senior position as the assistant to the Chief Inspector of the Royal Newfoundland Constabulary.

Season	Episodes																							
Season	1	2	3	4	5	6	7	8	9	10	11	12	13	14	15	16	17	18	19	20	21	22	23	24
1	Appears																							
2	Appears																							
3	Appears																							
4	Appears																							
5	Appears																							
6	Appears																							
7	Appears																							
8	Appears																							
9	Appears																							
10	Appears				X	Appears									X	Appears								
11	Appears									X	Appears				X	Appears								
12	Appears											X	Appears											
13	Appears				X	Appears	X	Appears				X	Appears	X	Appears	X	Appears							
14	Appears		X	Appears					X	Appears														
15	Appears		X		Appears		X	Appears				X				Appears			X	Appears				
16	Appears				X				Appears	X				Appears						X	Appears			
17	Appears		X						Appears	X			Appears	X		Appears								
18	Appears	X	Appears	X														Appears			X			
19	X	Appears	X																					

=== Violet Hart ===
Violet Hart
- First appearance: "The Canadian Patient"
- Portrayed by: Shanice Banton

In-universe information
- Title: Chief Coroner
- Occupation: Coroner, Morgue assistant, Con artist

Portrayed by Shanice Banton, Violet Hart becomes the chief coroner of Station House 4 after the departure of Dr. Ogden and Rebecca James. Introduced as an entrepreneur selling nutrition pills in Season 11 ("The Canadian Patient"), Dr. Ogden offers Violet the opportunity to attend medical school and work with as her assistant at the morgue. Miss Hart makes her ambitions to Dr. Ogden clear that she does not intend to remain Dr. Ogden's assistant forever. While impressed with her aptitude, Dr. Ogden becomes concerned with Violet's apparent lack of compassion. However, Inspector Brackenreid looks favourably upon Violet's competence and recommends her to officially take over the morgue as its chief coroner when Dr. Ogden departs to become a surgeon, becoming the first Black woman to hold the position. Murdoch finds it increasingly difficult to trust Violet, despite her professionalism, suspecting that Violet may be involved in unlawful activities.

Miss Hart's ambitions and shady past eventually nearly undo her success. To secure her position as coroner, she aligns with up-and-coming politicians until she learns the extent of their corruption extends to murder. She is given a second chance by Murdoch and Brackenreid, and is allowed to remain at the morgue. Violet later marries millionaire socialite Arthur Carmichael, but she grows frustrated that Arthur married her only to shock Toronto's elite for his own amusement. She coerces him into submission and takes control of his finances, investing her new wealth into Toronto's Black community through the local Starbright Club run by Cassiopeia Bright. The unexpected arrival of her criminal father results in Arthur's murder and the loss of Violet's fortune.

Season	Episodes																							
Season	1	2	3	4	5	6	7	8	9	10	11	12	13	14	15	16	17	18	19	20	21	22	23	24
11	X			Appears		X			AppearsA	X		Appears		X		Appears								
12	Appears		X	Appears	X	Appears			X			Appears			X	Appears								
13	Appears				X	Appears		X	Appears		X		Appears		X	Appears								
14	Appears							X	Appears															
15	Appears							X	Appears											X	Appears	X	Appears	
16	Appears					X	Appears							X	Appears	X	Appears	X	Appears					
17	Appears					X	Appears			X	Appears		X	Appears				X	Appears					
18	Appears		X	Appears					X	Appears								X	Appears					
19	Appears		X		Appears					X	Appears	X	Appears		X	Appears	X	Appears						

=== Detective Llewellyn Watts ===
Llewellyn Watts
- First appearance: "Concocting a Killer"
- Portrayed by: Daniel Maslany

In-universe information
- Title(s): Detective, Acting Inspector
- Occupation: Police officer

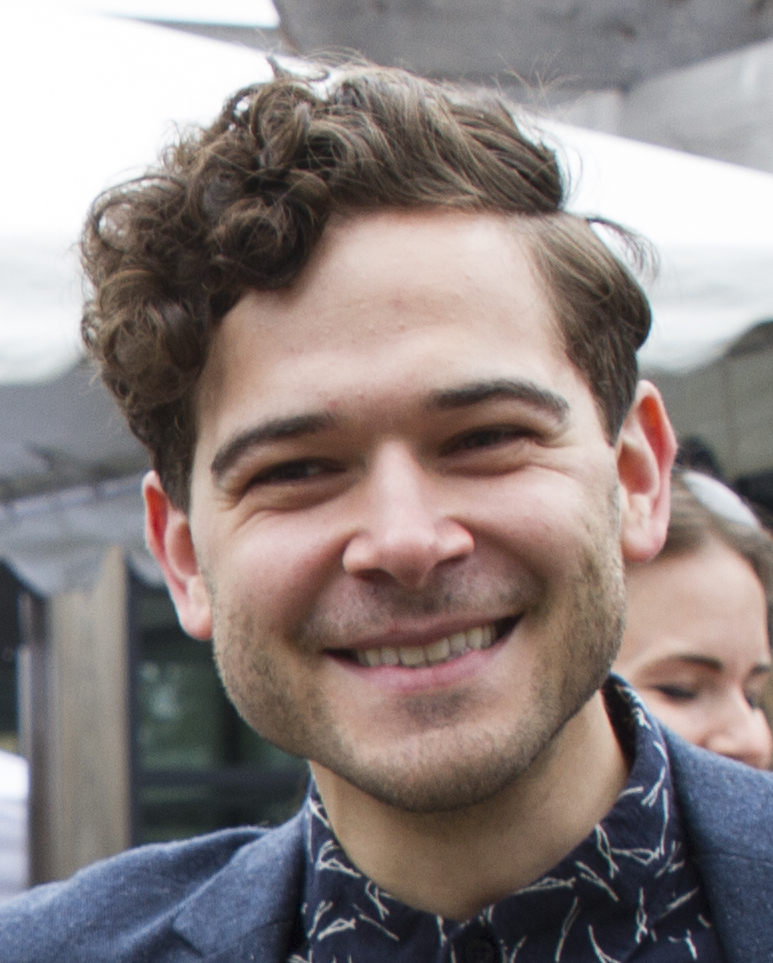
Daniel Maslany, the actor who plays Watts

Portrayed by Daniel Maslany, Llewellyn Watts (known as Detective Watts until his first name is revealed in "Hades Hath no Fury" (season 10, episode 15) is a detective, originally from Station House 1 who in "Concocting a Killer" (season 10, episode 4) is brought to Station House 4 to re-examine a case where new evidence has arisen that may mean a man sent to prison by Murdoch could be exonerated. In "A Murdog Mystery" (season 10, episode 11), when Inspector Brackenreid leaves Station House 4 to accompany James Pendrick to Panama, Watts is brought back as the station detective while Murdoch serves as the acting inspector. Detective Watts is assisted by Constable Slugger Jackson in some ongoing missing persons cases, which eventually leads Watts to his long-missing older sister ("Hades Hath no Fury" (season 10, episode 15)), who abandoned him when he was a child (their parents were dead and she just saw him as a burden). In "Up from Ashes" (season 11, episode 1) and after Inspector Brackenreid's return, Watts remains working with Station House 4. In "Murdoch Schmurdoch" (season 11, episode 15), while investigating the murder of a Jewish man, Watts recognizes a Yiddish lullaby as the same one his late mother used to sing to him. Llewellyn is told that if his mother sang that, his family must be Jewish. Llewellyn thinks it unlikely as "Watts is not a Jewish name." He's told that names are often changed when families immigrate, and if his mother was Jewish, so is he. After researching, Llewellyn discovers his family's original name was Wattenberg, but his parents changed it when they immigrated to Canada.

Like Murdoch, Watts is extremely well-read and philosophical, approaching his cases with objective analytical logic in the vein of Sherlock Holmes. However, Watts prefers performing his investigations outdoors and on the streets. He can be difficult to work with because he tends to speak with little regards to social graces and voices his thought processes aloud and unfiltered. Watts' eccentric body language and speech patterns are reminiscent of famous Canadian pianist and personality Glenn Gould.

In season 13, Detective Watts begins a relationship with Jack Walker, a local butcher that Watts meets during a case. Their relationship becomes romantic, but they are forced to keep the true nature of their relationship discreet, owing to laws against homosexuality and to avoid damaging each other's public reputations. Jack later marries a woman named Clara, who is pregnant with their son Samuel, and breaks up with Watts. Watts briefly entertains a relationship with poet Milo Strange, but returns to Jack when Watt quits the Toronto Constabulary out of disgust for Brackenreid's decision to manipulate evidence — he and Jack then temporarily run away with Samuel to New York. After leaving New York at the end of season 15, Watts lives in a Mennonite colony for several months, but leaves after Murdoch accuses him of hiding, though he does not yet return to Station House 4.

Although Inspector Brackenreid had turned a blind eye to Watts' relationships, Brackenreid's temporary successor Inspector Edwards arrests Watts on charges of indecency related to homosexual activities. On principle, he refuses to leave his prison cell after all the other men are released and begins a hunger strike, until Violet Hart spikes his water with amines and encourages him to use his voice in a setting where he will be heard. He rejoins the constabulary at the request of George when the latter becomes acting inspector of Station House 4 while Brackenreid is away in England to care for a sick relative and Murdoch has been abducted.

Season	Episodes																							
Season	1	2	3	4	5	6	7	8	9	10	11	12	13	14	15	16	17	18	19	20	21	22	23	24
10	X			Appears	X						Appears			X	Appears	X		Appears						
11	Appears		X			Appears				X		Appears		gX	Appears									
12	Appears	X		Appears	X	Appears			X		Appears		X				Appears							
13	X					Appears	X	Appears		X	Appears	X	Appears	X		Appears								
14	Appears				X	Appears																		
15	Appears		X	Appears								X	Appears				X	Appears						
16	Appears		X			Appears	X		Appears	X		Appears	X				Appears	X					Appears	
17	Appears			X	Appears		X	Appears		X			Appears	X	Appears	X		AppearsA	X		Appears		X	
18	Appears	X	Appears		X		Appears				X	Appears					X	Appears		X	Appears			
19	Appears						X	Appears				X	Appears		X		Appears							

=== Inspector Albert Choi ===
Albert Choi
- First appearance: "The New Recruit"
- Portrayed by: Paul Sun-Hyung Lee

In-universe information
- Gender: Male
- Title: Inspector
- Occupation: Police officer

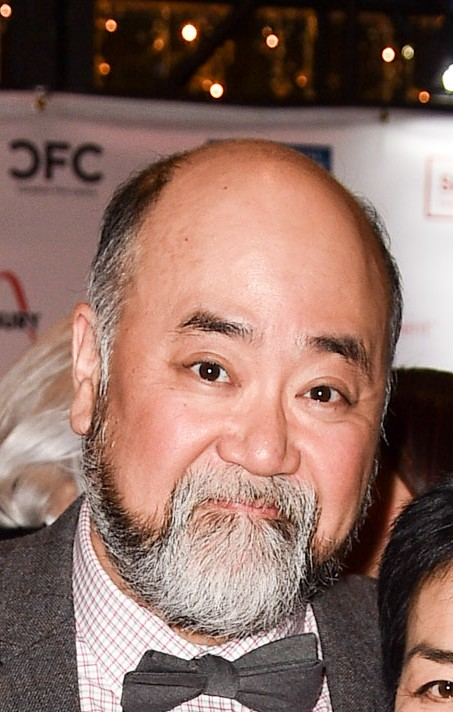
Paul Sun-Hyung Lee

Portrayed by Paul Sun-Hyung Lee. Brackenreid recruited Choi based on the latter's experience as a police inspector in the United States. As a Korean, he has experienced discrimination. Choi has developed a tough, no nonsense attitude, and he values competence. While he finds Murdoch's methods novel and unusual, he quickly becomes open to Murdoch's investigative techniques and supports him by creating a workshop at Station House 4 for Murdoch's inventions.

In "He Ain't Heavy, He's My Brother" (season 19, episode 6), we learn that Inspector Choi has a brother named Samuel. Inspector Choi went to America before Korea was annexed by the Empire of Japan. When he left for America, it was not his intention to leave for good. But life found its own course. Inspector Choi will always want freedom for his people. In the season finale, he is reunited with Vivian Moon.

Season	Episodes																					
Season	1	2	3	4	5	6	7	8	9	10	11	12	13	14	15	16	17	18	19	20	21	22
18	Appears									X		Appears				X		Appears	X		Appears	
19	Appears				X	Appears	X				Appears	X						Appears				

== Supporting characters ==
=== Dr. Emily Grace ===
Portrayed by Georgina Reilly, Emily Grace is the new coroner who joins the morgue in season 5 as Dr. Ogden leaves to set up her private practice. Initially described as Dr. Ogden's protégée, Dr. Grace is a trained medical doctor but admits she prefers pathology because she has little patience to maintain a good bedside manner. She is interested in spiritualism, believing that it is compatible with scientific study. Though eager and impatient, she quickly learns the rules of Station House 4 and proves to be a highly competent coroner to Murdoch in his investigations.

Emily later becomes a love interest for Constable Crabtree; they become good friends and she often enjoys his company and entertains his far-fetched theories with some enthusiasm. A tentative romance develops between them in season 6, but George breaks off their relationship after she kisses Leslie Garland, the brother of Julia Ogden's first husband Dr. Darcy Garland. (She kisses Leslie to prevent him from ruining her undercover disguise as Mademoiselle Desiree Deneuve). Leslie asks her out to dinner and Emily initially refuses, but as she is no longer dating George, she consents to having dinner with Leslie, unaware that George was on his way to Emily's office with flowers and seeking to reconcile with Emily.

After Emily finds out that Leslie was behind the threatening letters to Dr. Ogden, Emily ends things with Leslie. George is still initially quite distant with Emily, though gradually they become friends again. Emily joins the Women's Suffrage movement in season 8, becoming a strong advocate and encouraging Dr. Ogden to support them. Through the suffrage movement, Emily becomes acquainted with Lillian Moss and they eventually enter a romance. In season 8, Lillian Moss proposes to her to move to London, England, and fight there for the women's suffrage. Though Lillian is murdered by the husband of her ex-lover, Emily still chooses to follow through with moving to London and finally leaves Toronto for London alone at the end of the season 9, episode 3 "Double Life".

=== Constable Henry Higgins ===
Portrayed by Lachlan Murdoch. Constable Henry Higgins is a police constable at Toronto's Station House 4. He frequently assists George Crabtree in investigations. When Henry gets married in Season 12, it is revealed that he has changed his name to Henry Hieronymus Higgins-Newsome.

Higgins is best known for doing his own thing when it comes to any sort of case or off duty business, ranging from locating a new kind of ice cream with George (Season 9 Episode 15, "House of Industry") or watching boxing fights with Jackson (Season 8 Episode 3, "Glory Days"). It appears that he and George are best friends, and that he is somewhat of an assistant to him. Higgins has appeared in almost all the episodes. Higgins was amongst the sceptical constables to whom Murdoch presented his Pneumograph (Season 1 Episode 8, "Still Waters"). Henry was also one of the three who contributed to the purchase of the motor car between himself, George and Jackson in "Murdoch Takes Manhattan".

Henry is prone to making frequent mistakes in episodes, but usually has a redeeming moment towards the end. Detective Murdoch has taught Henry how to correctly make shoe impressions in the mud in "Child's Play" after Henry messes up three footprints beforehand, having no clue how to do them exactly. When Prince Alfred visited Toronto and Constable George Crabtree was assigned to his security, Higgins assisted Detective William Murdoch with an investigation into the murder of Maggie Gilpatrick. Murdoch taught Higgins about fingermarks and how to trace a person's next of kin. When it was determined there was a plot to kidnap Prince Alfred, Higgins was selected to impersonate the prince to help safeguard His Highness (Season 1, Episode 12, "The Prince and the Rebel"). However, Higgins also tends to let words slip out of his mouth before thinking about them, but means no harm. Such an example of this is during "Unlucky in Love" (Season 9 Episode 12) when Higgins accidentally insults baby Roland when Detective Murdoch is worried about Roland not walking yet and suggest that 'Maybe he's just slow.' which annoys Murdoch. Higgins later apologizes sincerely for this though, never meaning to speak ill of Murdoch's son. Nevertheless, Henry has proven himself to be good with young children, during this episode as well as "Raised on Robbery" (Season 9, Episode 9).

Growing up, Higgins family owned a piano shop. He did not enjoy playing, but he loved all of the parts. (Season 7 Episode 17, "Blast of Silence") It's also known that Henry's mother is from the Gaspé in Quebec, and he knows how to speak a bit of French as shown in "Convalescence and Monsieur Murdoch". Higgins has a homosexual cousin and so was aware of the secret gay club where homosexual men gathered in Toronto (Season 1 Episode 5, "'Til Death Do Us Part").

In "War on Terror" (Season 5 Episode 4), Henry is caught in an explosion along with George and is rendered unconscious, resulting in George attempting to find the culprit behind the bombing of Milne's store. The bomber is caught, and Higgins returns to Station House 4 having been hospitalized for the majority of the episode. In the beginning of Season 10, (Season 10 Episode 1, "Great Balls of Fire, Part 1") Higgins picks up smoking cigars, but whether this was just to impress the Inspector or not is unknown, as we're never shown him smoking again afterwards. At the end of the Season 10 finale (Season 10 Episode 18, "Hell to Pay"), along with Constable George Crabtree and Constable Slugger Jackson, Henry is caught in an ambush; all are shot and possibly murdered.

In Season 11, Higgins begins courting Ruth Newsome (of the Mimico Newsomes), sister of Roger Newsome, who was involved in several of Murdoch's investigations. In Episode 11 ("Biffers and Blockers"), Higgins has taken up cricket and also engaged a butler, at Ruth's suggestion, part of his transformation to join the upper class. In Episode 12 ("Mary Wept"), Henry attempts to propose to Ruth but is interrupted when a body falls from a bell tower and lands just behind him, traumatizing Ruth. Ruth later proposes to Henry herself and is accepted. While Henry quits the constabulary believing that he has married into wealth, the apparent loss of the Newsome fortune humbles him into asking for his job back and begins moonlighting as a motorcar cab driver for additional money to support his new family. He later becomes a father to a daughter, Jordan Higgins-Newsome. Despite retaining his laidback demeanor, Henry becomes more reliable as a constable, particular when George is absent.

=== Rebecca James ===
Portrayed by Mouna Traoré, Rebecca is a young woman of humble origins who has recently arrived in Toronto, living at the Junction, and working as an overnight cleaner for the city morgue. Dr. Ogden meets Rebecca on her first day back as the Chief Coroner, where Rebecca exhibits a genuine interest in anatomy that Dr. Ogden appreciates. Because she is African Canadian, a number of people are unhappy with the attention that Dr. Ogden gives her. When Rebecca is dismissed from her position for removing evidence from the morgue for an experiment that provided evidence, Dr. Ogden hires her back as Morgue Assistant. It is revealed that Rebecca attended a year at the New York Medical College for Women. When her patron died, his son was less inclined to support her schooling so she had to leave. She eventually resumes her medical studies at the Ontario Medical College for Women while working at the morgue, and her application to work at the City Morgue is officially granted at the end of summer of '03. She later completes her studies to become a family doctor and departs to open a medical practice in Chatham, where she eventually marries her sweetheart, Nate Desmond.

=== Margaret Brackenreid ===
Margaret, portrayed by Arwen Humphreys, is married to Inspector Thomas Brackenreid and together they have two young boys. Margaret is a very passionate woman, who is always very determined in everything she does. Thomas Brackenreid had just come out of the army when Margaret's father asked him to join the family's plumbing business. Margaret thought he'd have been a good plumber, but his heart was set on the police force. Married to a policeman, she knew what she was getting into, no point in complaining about the long hours – and the worry. But still... after they had two sons, Margaret does worry about her husband's safety due to his career as a police officer. Margaret does not like the opera but instead enjoys classical music on their gramophone. She is a good cook, bakes her own bread, and is noted for her excellent plum pudding at Christmas by Murdoch.

She is involved in the temperance movement for a period, and once becomes suspicious of her husband's relationship with an opera singer, but is typically portrayed as a loyal and loving partner. Brackenreid has stated he met Margaret when he was a beat cop and he arrested her for causing a disturbance. She and Thomas have two children, John and Bobby. John, the elder son, would go on to become a Constable under his father at Station House 4 much to his mother's chagrin; after a near life-threatening accident, John leaves police work to become an actor instead, to Margaret's relief. Margaret is greatly distressed when her younger son Bobby is involved in the death of a boarding school classmate and disappears to evade justice, finding relief only after Bobby returns to face charges, even though he is ultimately convicted and incarcerated. In season 9, episode 13, "Unlucky in Love", Margaret Brackenreid has started a wedding planner business. She is later hired as a nursing assistant for Dr. Ogden at the Toronto women's medical clinic.

=== Effie Newsome ===
Portrayed by Clare McConnell, Effie is a lawyer and a distant relative of Ruth Newsome, as part of the considerably less wealthy Wexford Newsomes. She appears at Ruth and Henry's wedding, newly divorced and disinterested in Ruth's attempts to set her up with George Crabtree. Effie and George find themselves crossing paths soon afterwards and become friends, and later develop a romantic relationship. She marries George in the show's 16th season and is appointed by Chief Constable Brackenreid to be Toronto's first female crown attorney. She and George divorce when he leaves Toronto for a senior position as the assistant to the Chief Inspector of the Royal Newfoundland Constabulary at the start of the 19th season and she chooses to stay in Toronto. In episode 5 of season 20 ("Missing Persons") she becomes the first female judge in Canada only to have the Superior Court of Ontario shut the court down. This leaves Effie without a job. In episode 7 ("The Last Tango in Toronto") she leaves Toronto to dance with Tango expert Aldo Luna.

=== Constable Teddy Roberts ===
Portrayed by Kataem O'Connor, Teddy Roberts joins Station House 4 as a new constable, originally hailing from Chatham in southwestern Ontario. He proves to be an excellent marksman and is partnered with Henry Higgins.

== Major recurring ==
=== James and Sally Pendrick ===
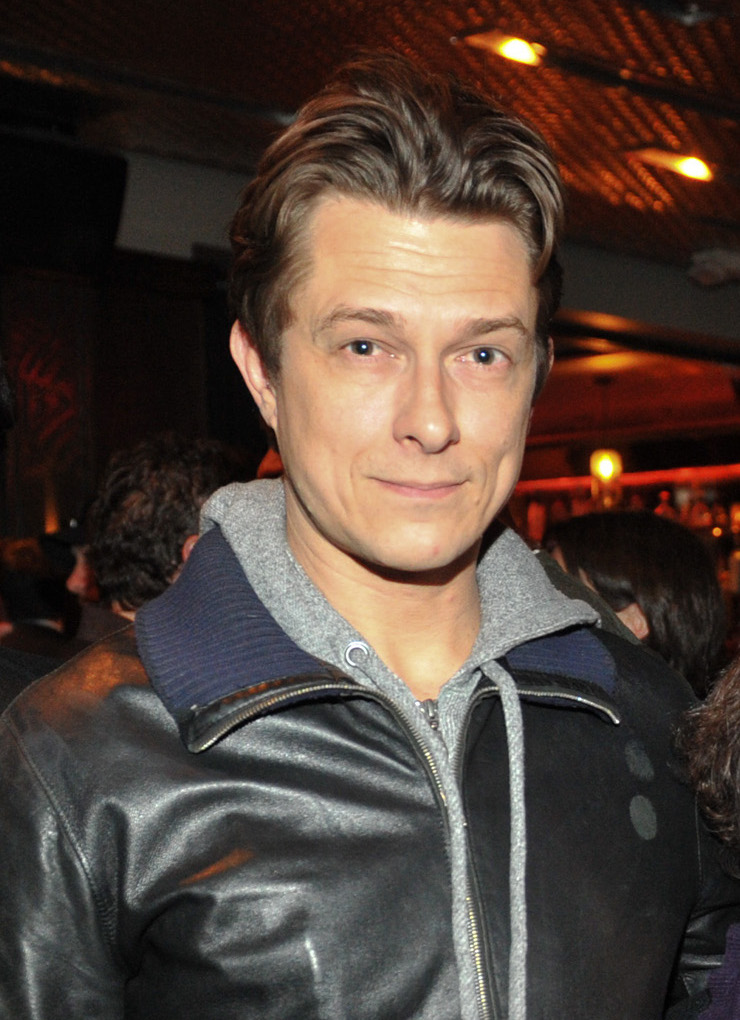
Peter Stebbings

James Pendrick (portrayed by Peter Stebbings) and his wife Sally (portrayed by Kate Greenhouse) are the owners of the tallest building in Toronto; at 11 stories tall, it is quite a view. The Pendricks are advocates of eugenics. James is an engineer and inventor. They own Rembrandt's painting Bathsheba at Her Bath, valued around $40 000, which is stolen in an episode in Season 3. Sally is an advocate of modern art, and gives Murdoch an avant-garde nude portrait of herself. The Pendrick family played a big part in the plot over the 2nd part of season 3. Indeed, James Pendrick was suspected by Murdoch of murder, or of being an accomplice to various crimes, in 4 of the 5 cases in which he was involved, much to Pendrick's annoyance. In the last episode of Season 3, Sally Pendrick is revealed to be a criminal from upstate New York, stealing her husband's fortune, and investing in the development of a doomsday weapon.

James Pendrick reappears in later seasons with various new inventions, accompanied by his assistant and lover, Svetlana Tsiolkovsky (portrayed by Christine Horne), the fictional daughter of Konstantin Tsiolkovsky. He and Murdoch develop a strong mutual respect and admiration for one another as inventors and innovators. While many of Pendrick's inventions or ideas often have tremendous potential, his success is hindered often by his refusal to let his inventions be used for political or violent purposes, resulting in Pendrick choosing to destroy his prototypes, or his attempts to enterprise fail due to the idea being too far ahead of its time. Sally escapes justice at the end of Season 3, and she reappears in S13 E11 "Staring Blindly Into the Future". This time she kidnaps multiple prominent scientists along with Murdoch and his associates, and forces them to try to assemble an atom bomb, which later results in her death when her captives outsmart her.

=== Dr. Darcy Garland ===
Portrayed by Jonathan Watton, the husband of Dr. Julia Ogden. He does, in fact, get along just fine with Detective William Murdoch. At the end of Season 5, Julia and Darcy part ways because she realizes she is with the wrong person; Darcy is slowly-shown to not be the kind of man he originally represented himself to her, at one point claiming to support her views only to, later, turnaround and object as it will affect his reputation and chances of advancement. However, part way into Season 6, Darcy has second thoughts on separating from Julia and tears up their divorce papers. In episode "Lovers in a Murderous Time", Murdoch spots Darcy with his own mistress. Initially confronting him, Murdoch is goaded into punching him. In episode "Crime and Punishment", Darcy is murdered by James Gillies, and Julia is implicated in his death by Gillies.

=== Leslie Garland ===
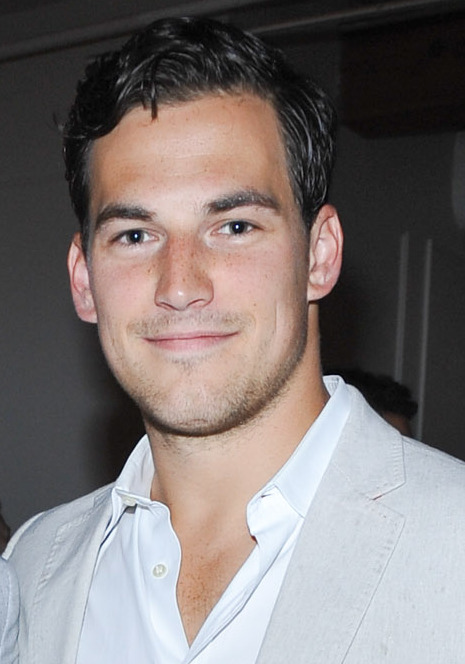
Giacomo Gianniotti

Portrayed by Giacomo Gianniotti, Leslie is the brother of Darcy Garland, whom Julia meets after Darcy's death when she finds him at Darcy's house. Despite appearing cordial towards both Julia and Murdoch, he actually blames them for his brother's death and resents them. Previously a law student, Murdoch learns that Leslie was expelled from university. He remains in Toronto, working as a gardener. During his stay, he is formally introduced to Emily Grace and they form a connection over shared interests. He briefly competes with George over the affections for Dr. Grace, eventually winning her over after George breaks up with her due to a misunderstanding. However, Dr. Grace later learns that Leslie is behind a series of threatening letters addressed to Julia from the long-dead James Gillies as a form of revenge on Dr. Ogden and Murdoch. Emily breaks up with him soon afterward and reveals the truth to Dr. Ogden, who furiously expels Leslie from Darcy's home and states her intention to sell Darcy's estate. In Season 8, "On the Waterfront, Part 2", Leslie has passed the bar and is arguing for the Crown Prosecutor, against Julia and Emily, both were arrested for advocating for women's right to vote. All charges are dropped, with Garland releasing all the women, except Emily, who will still be charged.

=== Constable Augustus Jackson ===
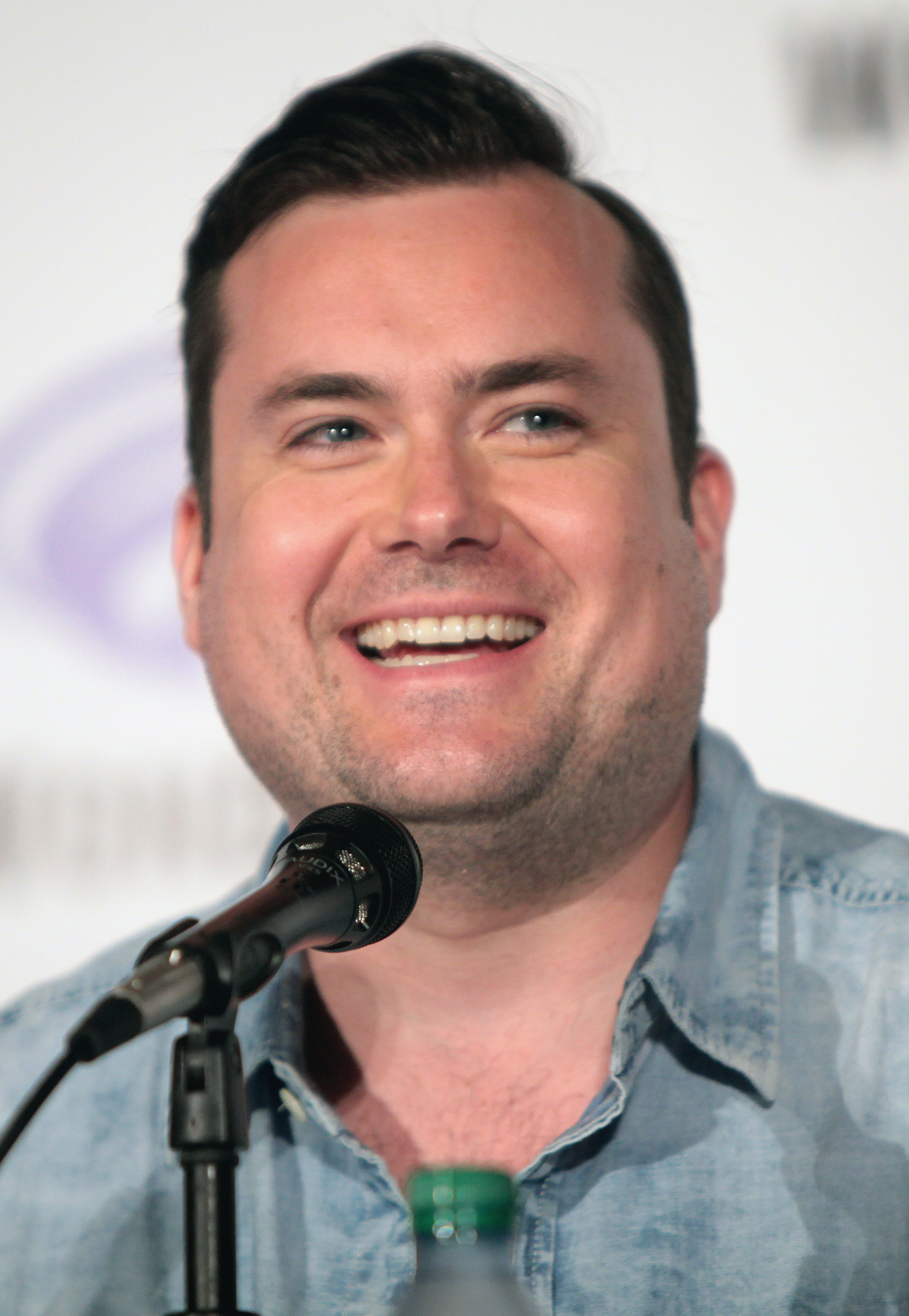
Kristian Bruun

Portrayed by Kristian Bruun. Constable Augustus "Gus" Jackson first appeared in season 5 as a baseball player for Station House 5 and was nicknamed "Slugger" for his impressive athletic abilities. He later appeared as a constable for Station House 4 in season 6 and became a recurring character beginning in season 7. He would occasionally join Crabtree and Higgins during investigations. During Detective Watts' missing women investigation for Station House 4, Jackson reveals that he had a wife who died in his arms from dropsy and encourages Watts not to give up for the sake of other women. In the finale of season 10, Jackson, Higgins, and Crabtree walk into a trap set by Chief Constable Davis, at the orders of the ruthless businessman Robert Graham; the three constables are all shot by Graham's men. When they are found by Detective Watts, Jackson is taken to the hospital with Higgins, though Jackson succumbs to his wounds. His funeral occurs at the beginning of season 11; when the constables attempt to place his portrait at Station House 4 to honour him, corrupt councilman Franklin Williams orders it taken down. When Station House 4 returns to control of Inspector Brackenreid, he restores the portrait of Jackson and he, Crabtree and Higgins drink in honour of their fallen comrade.

=== Louise Cherry ===
Louise, portrayed by Bea Santos, is a journalist who originally works for the Toronto Gazette. Tenacious and very clever, Louise is a woman who doesn't take 'no' for an answer. In season 11 ("The Canadian Patient"), Louise is arrested for impersonating the Mercy Killer by fabricating letters from the murderer which are published in the Toronto Gazette. Later, she is hired by another paper, the Toronto Telegraph, after receiving a visit from the editor while she is in jail who offers her a more prominent title and wages significantly more substantial than she was receiving at the Gazette. George briefly dates Louise in season 10, but learns that she thinks poorly of his friends and finds her blunt personality makes them incompatible. However, he does value her feedback on his literary career and they maintain a tentative friendship. Louise also later befriends Dr. Ogden and Effie Newsome, but Louise's dedication to putting her career foremost and refusing to compromise, even at the expense of anyone else, often make her friends leery of trusting her too much.

=== Terrence Meyers ===
Portrayed by Peter Keleghan, Meyers has been a recurring character since season one. He works as a spy for the Government of Canada, and always says it's "a matter of national security". Like his boss, Prime Minister Sir Wilfrid Laurier, he is very much disliked by Station House 4 and always shows up at the most suspicious times. Many of his early projects involve ensuring Canada achieves air superiority. In season 15, "Murdoch Knows Best", it is revealed that in civilian life Meyers is married with a family and runs an insurance company.

=== Ruth Newsome ===
Portrayed by Siobhan Murphy, Ruth is Henry Higgins' wife and Effie Newsome's cousin. A member of the wealthy and highly eccentric Mimico branch of the Newsome family, her brother Roger introduces her to George Crabtree in hopes of setting them up, but George finds Roger annoying to the point of hatred and Ruth instead attracts the interest of Henry Higgins. Despite her vacuous personality, she is obliviously astute in other areas, such as common scams for money. She and Henry eventually marry and have a young daughter named Jordan.

=== Robert Parker ===
Portrayed by Marc Senior, American Robert Parker is a private investigator who served in the U.S. Army and was a Pinkerton agent who was once part of the squad that tracked Butch Cassidy to Colorado. He arrives in Toronto to find the Pinkerton agent who ordered the death of his brother Daniel, also a Pinkerton agent, who was considered expendable as a black man. He eventually forms an informal partnership working at Station House 4 as a special constable and demonstrates a strong sense of justice. His undoing comes when he attempts to arrest con artist John Lincoln, who has arrived in Toronto to blackmail Violet Hart, without substantial proof that Lincoln was responsible for a recent murder. The action draws attention to his unrecognized status as a special constable to the chief constable, who orders Brackenreid to fire Parker, leaving him feeling betrayed and believing his colleagues at Station House 4 do not support him because he is black. Although Miss Hart warns him to leave the city to protect himself from repercussions, he refuses and continues to investigate Lincoln. Parker is later found dead and his body left among tramps, with the implication that Miss Hart may have been involved with his death in order to protect her own position as chief coroner. Following Parker's funeral, Brackenreid orders Station House 4 to continue Parker's work and avenge his death.

== Minor recurring ==
=== Harry Murdoch (Harry Smith) ===
Portrayed by Stephen McHattie, he is the father of Detective William Murdoch. When Murdoch meets his father for the first time after a long estrangement (episode: 1.06 - "Let Loose the Dogs"), for most of the case, he believes his father to be a killer and primary suspect based on his own prejudice that Harry had indirectly caused his mother's death by hitting her; after his innocence was proven, at William's request his father tells him that, as flawed and a drunk as he may have been, he never hit either his mother or him. Harry leaves Toronto, telling his son that he has plans to settle in the West. Murdoch later goes to British Columbia to investigate a case with a fellow Mounted Policeman (episode: 2.13 - "Anything You Can Do..."), where he meets up with his father. His father reveals to William that he has a half-brother. Harry only found out about this son in the past five years. Harry also explained why his other son believes his name is "Smith". In season 12 Harry Murdoch was killed due to his involvement in the kidnapping of an infant child 30 years earlier.

=== Nina Bloom ===
Nina, portrayed by Erin Agostino, is the most popular burlesque dancer at the infamous Star Room. Nina doesn't much care what people think of her because her reputation is not who she is. She doesn't dance at the burlesque to snag a husband. She enjoys it and won't deny herself the things that bring her pleasure, and that includes George. George and Nina's relationship continues to be both challenging and challenged in Season 10 and by the end of Season 11, Nina leaves Toronto for her dream job in Paris. She returns for one episode in season 16, with a travelling burlesque show, which she invites George and Effie to attend.

=== Anna Fulford ===
Portrayed by Lisa Faulkner. Murdoch's former love from Bristol, England, during season 3. She also appears in season 4, where it is revealed that she is engaged to another man. Murdoch later finds out that her fiancé was a member of the Black Hand, a criminal organization and forerunner of the Mafia, who chose to elope with Anna with the counterfeit money he was smuggling. This forced the Black Hand to kill him and put a hit on Anna, assuming she was complicit. This causes Anna to change her name. Murdoch later finds her working in a library where one of Anna's colleagues was murdered. Murdoch fears for her safety because the Black Hand still has a price on her head. By the end of the two-part episode, Murdoch fakes Anna's death, so the Black Hand would stop chasing her. She is later revealed to have had a son from her relationship with William, whom she named Harry, after Murdoch's father.

=== Freddie Pink ===
Portrayed by Alex Paxton-Beesley, Winifred "Freddie" Pink is a private detective in Montreal. She first met Murdoch when they were children as Governor General Young Scholars, where they were rivals. Tough and capable of protecting herself, she possesses a keen eye and mind, but little regard for her own personal safety. Freddie and Murdoch meet again as adults years later, when Murdoch is investigating a murder in Montreal and Freddie is investigating a divorce case. Realizing the common denominator between the cases was their attendance at the same camp, they work together to solve the murder. She later establishes her private detective business in Toronto, where Julia approaches her to investigate the actual parentage of the Murdochs' adopted son, Roland. Murdoch later approaches Freddie to protect his son Harry and to find Harry's mother, Anna Fulford.

=== Lillian Moss ===
Portrayed by Sara Mitich, Lillian Moss is a suffragist, whom Emily Grace comes to know through their mutual support of women's rights. Because she refused to marry a man chosen by her family, she was disowned. It is revealed early on that Lillian is a lesbian and is extremely attracted to Dr. Grace. Emily's feelings towards Lillian remained ambiguous until "Toronto's Girl Problem", when Emily and Lillian begin a passionate romance. However, soon after Lillian convinces Emily to join her in London to pursue the suffragist cause, Lillian is murdered.

After her death, Lillian's true identity is revealed to be Helen Walker. When Helen's affair with a married woman, Gladys, was discovered by Gladys' brutish, bullying husband, Joe, the women were lured onto a boat, where Joe attempted to kill Helen. With the attempt was thwarted by Gladys, the women tossed Joe overboard, leaving him for dead, and staged a boating accident that left Helen the sole survivor because they knew the police would not believe their version of what had occurred. Despite Helen's insistence that they separate, Gladys foolishly pursued her to Toronto, by-which-time Helen had become Lillian Moss and had fallen in love with Emily Grace. When Joe, having secretly survived the attempt on his life, confronted Lillian to learn Gladys' whereabouts, he killed Lillian when she refused to reveal where Gladys had gone.

=== Dr. Llewellyn Francis ===
Dr. Francis, portrayed by Paul Rhys, is a bad tempered pathologist from Scotland Yard, who replaces Dr. Ogden who left for a job in Buffalo, New York. He is portrayed as cold and often dismissive in his manner. His character always clashes with Murdoch.

It is revealed that Dr. Francis accepted the position in Toronto only because his wife's family resided in Canada and after a great deal of persuasion from Inspector Brackenreid. Though he is a highly capable pathologist, the lack of trust between him and Murdoch result in frequent frustration. When Murdoch goes behind Francis' back to approach Dr. Ogden for an analysis, Francis reluctantly confirms that Ogden's analysis is correct but is furious with how Murdoch continues to interfere and doubt Francis' professional abilities. He eventually quits and returns to England.

=== Reginald Poundsett ===
Portrayed by Jeff Douglas, he was Dr. Julia Ogden's boyfriend throughout S02 E12 (Werewolves) and S02 E13 ("Anything You Can Do"). These dates occurred when Murdoch was dating Enid Jones. It was believed that Dr. Ogden was seeing Reginald Poundsett only to make Detective William Murdoch jealous.

=== Sarah Pensall ===
Portrayed by Maria del Mar, a spiritualist medium who helps Murdoch with his case (Season One, episode 4, "Elementary, My Dear Murdoch"). Originally Murdoch did not trust her, but bad luck with his case caused him to change his mind and ask Ms. Pensall for help. In episode 11, "Bad Medicine", after having had a vision of Murdoch's apparent death, she returned to assist him in solving a series of murders; after the case's successful conclusion (in which Murdoch was seriously wounded but not killed), she left Toronto to travel to Prague.

=== Enid Jones ===
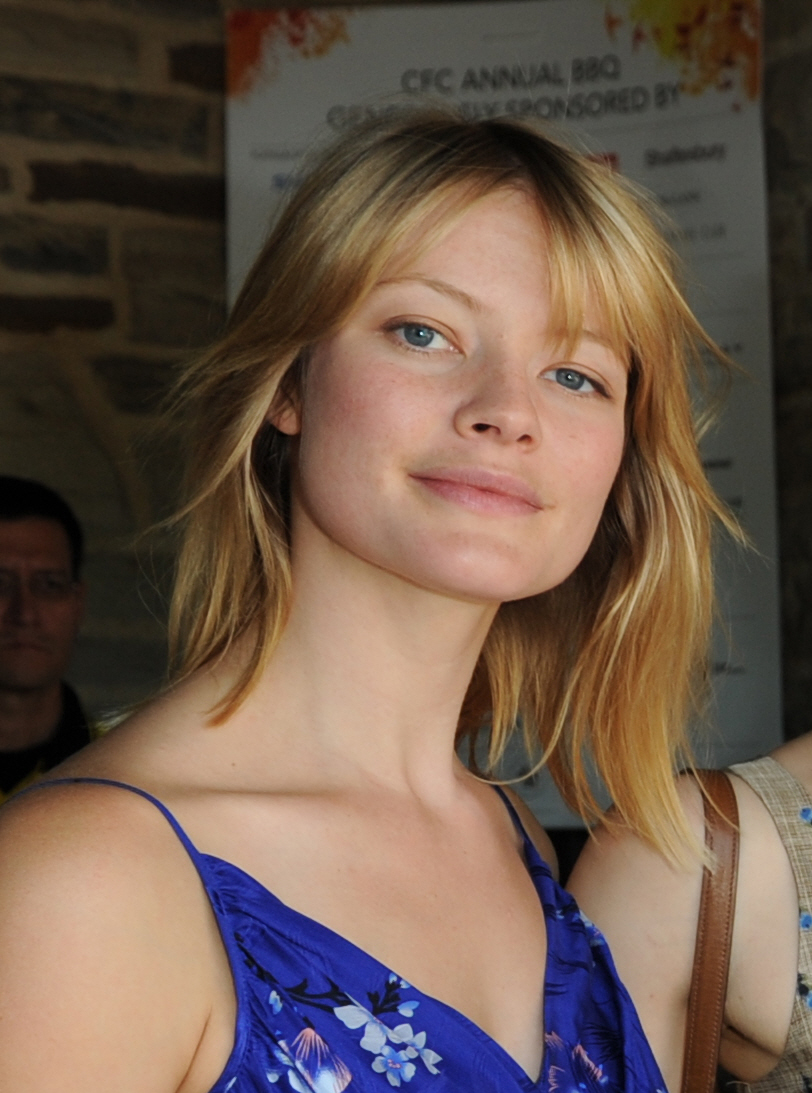
Sarah Allen

Portrayed by Sarah Allen, a romantic interest of Murdoch appearing in five episodes over the second half of season 2. She often does not get along with Dr. Julia Ogden because she suspects that Murdoch still has feelings for her.

=== Alwyn Jones ===
Portrayed by Dakota Goyo, he is the son of Enid Jones. He appears in 3 episodes in the second season. He captured Detective Murdoch's attention with his insatiable curiosity and vivid imagination, claiming he had seen a “giant”. While Murdoch and the constables searched for him at his mother's behest, Alwyn snuck into a secure compound and took the "giant"-actually a government experimental war machine-for a joyride through town until it short-circuited, "sparking" the relationship between Alwyn's mother and Detective Murdoch, after he rescued Alwyn.

=== Ruby Ogden ===
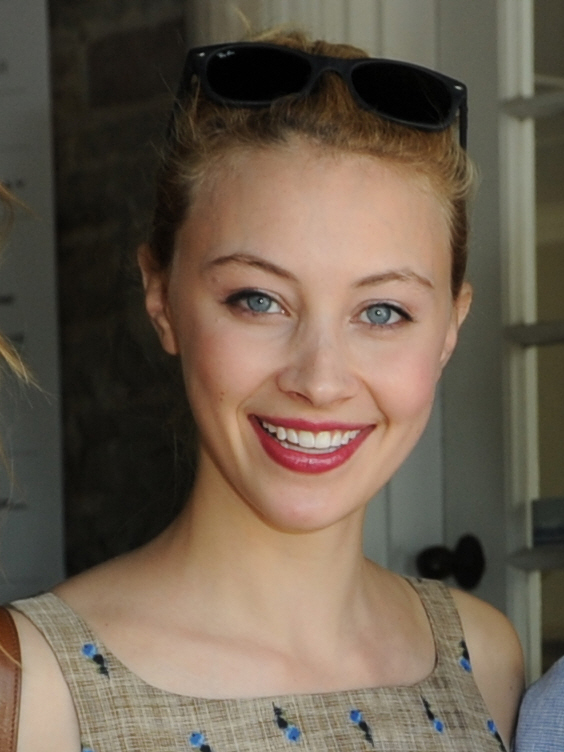
Sarah Gadon

A free-living journalist, portrayed by Sarah Gadon. She is the sister of Dr. Julia Ogden, and encourages Julia to be with Detective Murdoch. She also flirts with George Crabtree and Murdoch, making her sister Julia very jealous. She is first seen with Harry Houdini. She later has an affair with H. G. Wells. She tells Dr. Ogden to not let Murdoch slip away from her.

=== Dr. Isaac Tash ===
A doctor known for having an illegal abortion care practice. He is a friend of Julia Ogden, having known her since their medical school days. When Julia went to him for an abortion due to a relationship she had with another man, he refused due to personal and legal reasons. When Julia almost died as a result of his decision, Isaac resolved never to allow another woman suffer as his friend did and has performed abortions in order to save the lives of other women. Due to Isaac being aware of Julia's abortion and his decision to keep it a secret, Murdoch misinterprets Isaac and Julia's relationship as romantic. Appears throughout the series twice.

=== Mick O'Shea ===
Portrayed by Jonathan Llyr. A Toronto dock worker, strongly dislikes Inspector Brackenreid to the point where he brutally beats him in an episode in season seven. He dies in a later episode.

=== Dr. Roberts ===
Dr. Roberts is a practising psychiatrist who assists William Murdoch on a number of cases, first introduced in Season 2, played by Paul Amos. Dr. Roberts, who was recently removed from his position at the Provincial Lunatic Asylum because his research on the workings of the criminal mind ruffled too many feathers. He is quite forward-thinking and is practicing at a private hospital in Etobicoke, the Toronto Hospital for the Incurables.

In "Twentieth Century Murdoch", Murdoch and Dr. Ogden, baffled by a supposed time machine, consult with Dr. Roberts on the psychiatric nature of the men holding it, Professor Harms and his assistant, Turner. Dr. Roberts' hand trembles and clenches in a spasm, and he drops his eyeglasses. He explains that he has Huntington's Chorea, which Dr. Ogden recognizes as a fatal degenerative nerve condition.

Later, in Murdoch's office, Dr. Roberts breaks a drinking glass, cutting his hand. George recognizes his bloody fingermark as the one discovered on the incriminating Santa suit. When Brackenreid, Murdoch, Crabtree and Dr. Ogden go to question him, they discover that Dr. Roberts has been frozen alive by Professor Harms, his stepbrother, in hopes that he can be revived and cured in the future. Using a headpiece that makes people susceptible to suggestion, Dr. Roberts hypnotized Murdoch into believing he had travelled in time, as he had all the other people who entered the "time machine" and contributed funds that will maintain his cryogenic state. Unsure of what to do, the police leave Dr. Roberts in his frozen state.

=== Minor recurring police officers ===
==== Chief Constable Stockton ====
Portrayed by Allan Royal. The Chief Constable who offers Murdoch a promotion to inspector, but decides not to give him the job because Murdoch is Catholic. Inspector Brackenreid is ordered to tell Murdoch he can't have the job, but the Inspector instead convinces Murdoch to decline the job. Stockton retires from the Toronto Constabulary sometime in late 1898, and is replaced by Percival Giles.

==== Constable Worseley ====
Played by Sean Harraher, Worseley is an older constable, with red hair and beard, who often appears when a group of constables are assigned to a task. First listed in credits in "Blood and Circuses". Worseley makes his final appearance in the final episode of season 9, when he is killed by Eva Pearce.

==== Detective/Chief Inspector Hamish Slorach ====
Portrayed by Patrick McKenna, Slorach is introduced in season 3, "The Murdoch Identity", when Murdoch goes missing. He returns in season 8, "On the Waterfront, Part 1" and "On the Waterfront, Part 2", to replace Brackenreid while he is out after his assault. He reappears in season 12, episode 16, "Manual for Murder", to announce his impending retirement.

==== Chief Constable Percival Giles ====
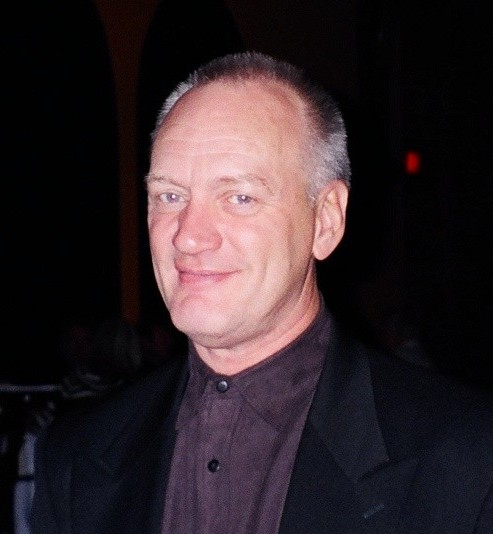
Nigel Bennett

Portrayed by Nigel Bennett. The Chief of police, he succeeded Chief Constable Stockton. He believed that Murdoch set a prisoner free in season 4 episode 13, "Murdoch in Wonderland"; in the season 5 episode 1, "Murdoch of the Klondike", Brackenreid covered for Murdoch with the story of a faulty lock. Giles did not believe this story but because he did not have any evidence, he could not arrest Murdoch. However, because of that, in a number of episodes in season 5, Giles seemed to have something personally against Murdoch and was always against anything that Murdoch said in any episode that had both Giles and Murdoch. The storyline with Giles personally hating Murdoch was dropped from the program, and because of that in season 6 episode 6, "Murdoch and the Cloud of Doom", when somebody threatened Toronto with a deadly toxic gas, Giles personally asked Murdoch to find the person. In season 6 episode 12, "Crime & Punishment" he arrested Dr. Ogden for the murder of her husband Dr. Darcy Garland and suspended both Murdoch and Brackenreid, but when they secretly continued their investigation, he reinstated them. In season 8, episode 7, Giles admits to being homosexual, regarding which another constable years prior had tried to blackmail him. Constable Hodge (see below) killed the attempted blackmailer; Hodge and Giles covered up the killing but Murdoch unravelled the story when a body was found in the basement of Station House 4, ending the careers of both and sending them to prison. In season 9, episode 1, Giles, now behind bars at the Don Jail, assists Crabtree and Murdoch in finding the killer of another inmate and thereby helping clear Crabtree of his own charge of murder. In season 13, episode 14, inmate Giles, who has been transferred from the Don Jail to Kingston Penitentiary, is among the first Detective Murdoch speaks to - Murdoch has been called in to investigate a murder at the Kingston Penitentiary.

==== Constable John Hodge ====
A constable, played by Brian Kaulback, seen around Station House 4 but not given a name until season 4, episode 1, "All Tattered and Torn", when Detective Malcolm Lamb returns to the station. In season 8, episode 7, "What Lies Buried", Constable Hodge was discovered to have accidentally killed a constable to prevent Chief Constable Giles, a detective at the time, from being blackmailed. Hodge was tried for manslaughter and imprisoned. He reappears briefly, serving drinks in a pub, in season 11, episode 1, "Up from Ashes", having been released from prison a few months earlier. He is still working in the pub in episode 18, "Free Falling".

=== Morality Officer Iona Berger ===
Introduced as a morally upright and extremely detail oriented office manager at Bosworth Rubber Factory, Iona Berger (portrayed by Lucy Hill), is recruited as the Toronto Constabulary's first female morality officer. As morality officer, she is often unyielding with following the rule of law, resulting in issuing a fine to Effie Newsome for failing to observe a minor bylaw, though she's encouraged to be more flexible and sympathetic by Detective Watts.

== Recurring antagonists ==
=== James Gillies ===
James Gillies, portrayed by Michael Seater, is Detective William Murdoch's nemesis. He is a cold, calculating, murderous criminal mastermind who hides behind a facade of cordiality. Gillies views his nefarious schemes as high-stakes games in which he and Murdoch match wits and, for which, there must be a clear winner and a loser. Priding himself on always being one step ahead of the detective, he often employs people as dispensable pawns to aid in his machinations, not hesitating to kill them when they no longer prove useful, to ensure their silence. During his first appearance, Gillies is shown to be a gifted student and teacher's assistant along with his friend and fellow teacher's assistant, Robert Perry. Murdoch eventually discovers that Gillies and Perry had murdered their physics professor, supposedly to test their knowledge of physics. Under pressure, Perry confesses to his involvement in the crime and implicates Gillies, after being tricked into believing that Gillies intended to kill him as well.

Gillies is arrested, convicted, and sentenced to death for his crimes; but he escapes from his execution and seeks revenge against Murdoch. Gillies kidnaps and buries Dr. Julia Ogden alive. Though Dr. Ogden is saved, Gillies escapes again. In his next act of revenge, Gillies frames Julia for the murder of her estranged husband, Dr. Darcy Garland. After capturing Murdoch, Gillies sets an elaborate trap to pressure Murdoch into choosing either his own life or that of the convicted Julia's. Though Murdoch chooses to save Julia, he is rescued, and Gillies is apprehended. Gillies is boarded on a train headed to Kingston where he is to be hanged for his crimes. While Gillies manages to escape from the train, Murdoch pursues him. After pinning Gillies down, Gillies distracts Murdoch with a kiss and jumps off a bridge, to escape. Despite an extensive manhunt undertaken by the Toronto Constabulary, Gillies is nowhere to be found, and it seems likely he perished from his fall.

After Gillies' fall, Julia begins receiving letters from someone claiming to be Gillies. The author of the letters threatens to kill Murdoch should Julia accept Murdoch's proposal for marriage or reveal the existence of the letters. Murdoch, Ogden, and Brackenreid begin investigating whether Gillies is alive, which results in finding what appears to be Gillies' body downriver from where he threw himself off the bridge. After Dr. Ogden and Dr. Emily Grace examine the badly decomposed body and perform a facial approximation on the skull, they and Murdoch believe the body to be Gillies'. The key piece of evidence suggesting the corpse is Gillies' is a bullet found embedded in its shoulder. Constable George Crabtree had shot Gillies in the shoulder, and the bullet was never removed. After careful examination, Murdoch ascertained the bullet to be the same that Crabtree shot Gillies with.

Years later, a murderer is caught who claims to be possessed by the spirit of James Gillies. Murdoch and Dr. Ogden interrogate the man and coax information from him that leads them to realize that Gillies is alive, having faked his death by killing someone of similar appearance, embedding the bullet George Crabtree shot him with into the corpse's shoulder, and throwing the corpse in the river he jumped into. After giving a clue to the whereabouts of Gillies, the murderer kills himself. Ogden's autopsy of the murderer reveals a small wireless radio transceiver hidden in his body as well as an even smaller wireless electroacoustic transducer embedded in his skull—both of which are soon after discovered to have been commissioned and implanted by Gillies. After following the clues to the address of a girl Gillies once kidnapped, he finds a talking doll whose message seems to suggest that Gillies has once again kidnapped Julia. Murdoch rushes to his home only to find Gillies instead holding Murdoch's young son hostage with a syringe filled with heroin. Gillies, who, as a result of his fall suffers from chronic pain and has a severely disfigured face, wants Murdoch, the man he most loves and respects, to kill him. Murdoch hesitates at first, desiring Gillies to receive punishment by the state, but then fires his gun at Gillies after Gillies threatens his son with the syringe. The gun, however, had been surreptitiously emptied of all but one bullet by Gillies sometime earlier, and doesn't fire. Gillies, given a renewed sense of purpose by his brush with death at the hands of his greatest adversary, still hovering over Murdoch's son with a syringe, and seemingly back in control, taunts Murdoch, telling him that he looks forward to the fun they will have together. However, Murdoch slides out a sleeve gun and shoots Gillies with a rubber bullet, incapacitating him. Gillies is captured and finally hanged for his crimes. Dr. Ogden performs Gillies' autopsy and removes his brain so that it may be studied, as she promised him she'd do years before on the train.

Michael Seater reprises his role in the Macy Murdoch webseries, portraying Gillies at a point in time prior to his scarring. In this series, he was responsible murdering 21st century time traveler Kurt Labine and stole his time machine. He used the machine to recruit a younger version of himself and sent him to the year 2025 to get close to Murdoch's descendant, Macy, under the anagram Miles J. Gaelus. Gillies set up Macy to solve her own future murder with the intent of trapping her as he did Murdoch. Eventually, he captured Macy's friends, Billie and Zane, as part of his own twisted experiment to force Macy to choose whether her friends or herself would die at the hands of a recreation of Sally Pendrick's laser. He also planned to bring Macy's body to torment Murdoch in the past before he killed him. Macy is able to thwart his plan and got Miles to turn on Gillies, and they use the time machine to send both versions of Gillies back to the July 31, 1904, the date of his hanging.

=== Eva Pearce ===
Portrayed by Daiva Johnston, Eva Pearce becomes Murdoch's nemesis, a white collar thief, kidnapper, and killer. She was deadly, manipulative, and cautious, making her a dangerous opponent of William Murdoch.

In her first appearance, Eva is introduced as a shop girl in the prestigious T. Eaton Co. department store where someone has been murdered. She flirts with Murdoch, who is unaware of her attentions until Dr. Ogden points it out to him. She is revealed to be responsible for causing murders by manipulating men that she seduces. Though Murdoch thwarts her plans to court a wealthy man, she gets away and manages to attract another suitor. She subsequently takes on the identity of Cassie Chadwick, claiming to be the illegitimate daughter of Andrew Carnegie, and manages to become the fiancée of Ian Worthington, president of the Canadian Bank. Her scheme to marry Worthington and force him to take on her debts fails when Murdoch exposes her true identity and she is arrested. Eva is later sent to an insane asylum, where she and other female "lunatics" such as Mrs. Lynd, Rose Maxwell, and Charlotte, as well as a murderess named Hannah, concoct an escape plan. Eva is the only one who manages to escape, securing her freedom by tricking a man into giving her a cab ride. Presumably she will continue to con men into getting what she wants. In her final appearance, the now-mentally-unstable Eva attempts to kill Julia and kidnaps Murdoch, with the intention of forcing herself on him to "give him the child he has always wanted" as she has become obsessed and delusional with him, having never succeeded in seducing him. She is ultimately unsuccessful, and while in a confrontation with Julia, bleeds to death after Julia manages to stab her in the throat.

=== Allen Clegg ===
Portrayed by Matthew Bennett, Allen Clegg has been undermining the United States government through Canada, with the intent to create a united North America according his values. He is thwarted several times through the collaboration of Murdoch and Terrence Meyers.

=== Amelia and Dorothy Ernst ===
Portrayed by Sarah Swire, Amelia and Dorothy Ernst are identical twin sisters. Amelia develops an obsessive interest in George Crabtree through his novels, and abducts him with the intent of coercing him into marriage. After persuading her to let him escape, her sister Dorothy appears as Effie Newsome's clerical assistant, with no apparent knowledge of Amelia's past doings. George believes Dorothy is lying or is actually Amelia, though he fails to prove either to Effie or Dr. Ogden. Dorothy later reveals that she was indeed lying to find a way to get close to Effie, in order to abduct her and hold her hostage to force George to marry Amelia. George and Effie manage to escape the ordeal, while both sisters remain at large.

=== Ralph Fellows ===
Portrayed by Colin Mochrie, Ralph Fellows is introduced as a hotel detective who begins to hold a grudge against Murdoch that grows increasingly murderous as he believes Murdoch looks down on his investigative skills.

== Historical figures ==
Several additional historical figures have been presented in the series.

=== Nikola Tesla ===
Portrayed by Dmitry Chepovetsky. The famous inventor, Nikola Tesla, helps Murdoch solve the case in the very first episode "Power" (January 20, 2008). He really likes inventing things and improving things as he was working on transmitting wireless phone calls throughout the episode. Later in the episode he feels that his work will not make him rich, so he explores new options. Tesla is one of Murdoch's heroes.

Tesla returns in "The Tesla Effect" (May 11, 2010), "Murdoch and the Undetectable Man" (January 28, 2019) and "Staring Blindly into the Future" (January 13, 2020).

=== Arthur Conan Doyle ===
Portrayed by Geraint Wyn Davies. He first appears in Season 1, episode 4 ("Elementary, My Dear Murdoch"), visiting Toronto to deliver a lecture on spiritualism. He returns in episode 9 ("Belly Speaker"). He follows Murdoch, trying to get a grasp on detective work for a future book and personal detective skills. He refers to Murdoch and himself as "similar people", because of their fathers both being alcoholics. Inspector Brackenreid retells to Doyle a story he had heard about a "Hell Hound of the Highlands", which is suggested inspired Doyle to write The Hound of the Baskervilles. He reappears in season 6 to help with the matter of a man with a personality disorder that led him to believe he was Sherlock Holmes. Because Arthur Conan Doyle is the creator and authority on Sherlock Holmes, he was brought to assist the detectives in tricking the man into revealing his true self. However, to Doyle's surprise, the man was an impeccable likeness to his character, offering all logical answers to his questions. Doyle even asked him how "Sherlock Holmes" could have survived his death at the Reichenbach Falls, as there were no footprints leading away from the cliff, but the man replies that he retraced his own footprints. Doyle is startled and admits that it is a good idea. It is suggested that the man gave the ideas that made it possible for Doyle to bring his character back to life in "The Adventure of the Empty House". He also names Sebastian Moran as Moriarity's assistant, a character found in later Holmes stories.

=== Other historical figures ===
- Prince Alfred (Chad Connell)
- Prime Minister H. H. Asquith (Dennis Cutts)
- Alexander Graham Bell (John Tench)
- Mabel Hubbard Bell (Catherine Joell MacKinnon)
- Joseph-Elzéar Bernier (Rémy Girard)
- Prime Minister Robert Borden (Patrick Galligan, John Ralston)
- Henri Bourassa (Christian Martel)
- Edgar Rice Burroughs (Adam Butcher)
- Calvin Bricker
- Andrew Carnegie (Philip Craig)
- Emily Carr (Kristen Thomson)
- Cassie Chadwick (Wendy Crewson)
- Charlie Chaplin (Matthew Finlan)
- Winston Churchill (Thomas Howes)
- Dr. Daniel Clark (Stephen Bogaert)
- Buffalo Bill Cody (Nicholas Campbell)
- Marie Curie (Ewa Placzynska)
- Leon Czolgosz (Goran Stjepanovic)
- Arthur Davidson (Matthew Tissi)
- Robert Nathaniel Dett (Mark Williams Jr.)
- George “Little Chocolate” Dixon (Milton Barnes)
- W. E. B. Du Bois (Derwin Phillips)
- John Craig Eaton (Michael Therriault)
- Timothy Eaton (Brian Rhodes)
- Mary Baker Eddy (Jayne Eastwood)
- Thomas Edison (David Storch)
- Thomas Edison Jr. (Scott Beaudin)
- Albert Einstein (Eric Charters)
- Sándor Ferenczi (Karl Graboshas)
- Reginald Fessenden (William Matthews)
- W. C. Fields (Andrew Chapman)
- F. B. Fetherstonhaugh (Trevor Hayes)
- Dr. Mahlon Bainbridge Folwell (Kevin Bundy)
- Henry Ford (Todd Hofley)
- Sigmund Freud (Diego Matamoros)
- King George V (Jamie Thomas King)
- Robert H. Goddard (Andrew Robinson)
- Emma Goldman (Lisa Norton)
- George Goulding
- John Bell Gourlay (Benjamin Sutherland)
- Florence Nightingale Graham (Kathryn Alexandre)
- Marcel Guillaume (Yannick Soulier)
- Margaret Haile (Nicole Underhay)
- William S. Harley (Neil Babcock)
- Martha Matilda Harper (Tara Rosling)
- Charlotte Hennessey (Rachel Wilson)
- Harry Houdini (Joe Dinicol)
- William Peyton Hubbard (Rothaford Gray)
- Jack Johnson (Ryan Allen)
- Al Jolson (Sayer Roberts)
- Carl Jung (Jeff Lillico)
- Buster Keaton (Alexander Elliot)
- Helen Keller (Amanda Richer)
- Will Keith Kellogg (Todd Thomas Dark)
- Rudyard Kipling (Seán Cullen)
- Sam Langford (Dwain Murphy)
- Stanley Laurel (Ryan Tapley)
- Prime Minister Sir Wilfrid Laurier (Brian Paul)
- Armand Lavergne (Marcello Di Fruscia)
- Lead Belly (real name Huddie William Ledbetter) (Richard Walters)
- Jack London (Aaron Ashmore)
- Thomas Longboat (D'Pharaoh McKay Woon-A-Tai)
- H. P. Lovecraft (Tyler East)
- George Lyon (Kevin Jubinville)
- Agnes Macphail (Zoe Fraser)
- Clara Brett Martin (Patricia Fagan)
- Guglielmo Marconi (Jason Card)
- George Marter (Jeffrey Wetsch)
- Bat Masterson (Steven Ogg)
- Madge Merton (Kristina Nicoll)
- Charles McCool (Robin Ward)
- President William McKinley (Brent Crawford)
- Lucy Maud Montgomery (Alison Louder)
- Lieutenant Governor Sir Oliver Mowat (Lieutenant Governor David Onley)
- James Naismith (Nigel Hamer)
- Carrie Nation (Valerie Buhagiar)
- William Beattie Nesbitt (Andrew Stelmack)
- Annie Oakley (Sarah Strange, Amber Marshall)
- Frank Oliver (Thomas Rickert)
- William Osler (Stewart Arnott)
- Anna Pavlova (Nicole Volossetski)
- Rocco Perri (Stefano DiMatteo)
- Vincenzo Peruggia (Johnathan Sousa)
- Mary Pickford (Peyton Kennedy, Eva Foote)
- Charles Ponzi (Jake Epstein)
- John Ross Robertson (Guy Bannerman)
- President Theodore Roosevelt (Marty Moreau)
- Ernest Rutherford (Andrew Hodwitz)
- Dan Seavey (Hugh Thompson)
- Edmund E. Sheppard (Brad Rudy)
- Clifford Sifton (Brad Austin)
- Anne Sullivan (Severn Thompson)
- Sam Steele (Matt Cooke)
- Augusta Stowe-Gullen (Julie Khaner)
- President William Howard Taft (Darryl Pring)
- Annie Taylor (Jillian Cook)
- Marshall Walter "Major" Taylor (Dewshane Williams)
- Tom Thomson (Brock Morgan)
- Tom Three Persons (Owen Crow Shoe)
- Mark Twain (William Shatner)
- Queen Victoria (Elizabeth Leslie)
- Booker T. Washington (Michael Blake)
- Guy Weadick (Damir Kovic)
- H. G. Wells (Peter Mikhail)
- Edith Wharton (Kate Campbell)
- Frank Lloyd Wright (Aaron Poole)
- Orville Wright (Daniel Cristofori)
- Wilbur Wright (Derek Bogart)
