= Dmitry Chepovetsky =

Canadian actor (born 1970)

- Born: 1970 (age 55–56); Lviv, Ukrainian SSR, Soviet Union

Dmitry Chepovetsky (Russian: Дмитрий Чеповецкий; born 1970) is a Soviet-born Canadian actor, best known for his role of Bob Melnikov in the TV series ReGenesis.

== Early life and education ==
Chepovetsky was born in Lviv in modern-day Ukraine. His family left in 1976 along with waves of other Jewish olim bound for Israel. Along the way, his family experienced an eight-month stopover in Italy while awaiting their travel visas. They then decided to change course for Regina, where his uncle lived. Since then, Chepovetsky has been splitting his time between Vancouver and Toronto, where he's been living for the past eight years, close to his older brother and nieces.

== Career ==
Chepovetsky acted in his first musical at the age of 14 while in high school in Regina, then began acting in local community. Thinking briefly about a different career path, he was accepted to the University of Toronto on a scholarship for its commerce program. But after three weeks he dropped out to work as an elf at Casa Loma and then worked numerous jobs until he got to Ryerson Theatre School. He also trained with David Rotenberg and Carol Rosenfeld, as well as Kate Hale at the Foursight Theatre. Aside from his numerous acting credits, among them stints on critically acclaimed TV shows and feature films such as The X-Files, Lucky Number Slevin and Stargate, Chepovetsky is likely best known for his recurring role on ReGenesis as Bob Melnikov, the show's lead biochemist and a person with Asperger syndrome. The role has garnered him two Gemini Award nominations for best actor in a dramatic series; once in 2005 and another in 2007. The show has reached 120 countries in over 18 languages. He also played a role in the video game Outriders as Jakub Dabrowski. Chepovetsky has played historical figure Nikola Tesla in four episodes of long running detective series Murdoch Mysteries.

== Personal life ==
Chepovetsky enjoys photography, music, movies, theatre and writing.

== Filmography ==
=== Film ===
Year	Title	Role	Notes
1998	I'll Be Home for Christmas	Angel	
1998	Saving Grace	Eton	
1999	Fiona		
2000	Chain of Fools	Dr. Welby	
2000	Cinderella: Single Again	Dashing Prince	
2000	Mission to Mars	Technician	
2002	K-19: The Widowmaker	Sergei Maksimov	
2002	The Chosen Family	Ewin	(short movie)
2002	The Safety of Objects	Bartender	
2004	The Last Hit	Doctor	
2006	Lucky Number Slevin	Bodyguard No. 2	
2006	Man of the Year	Eckhart	
2007	Dead Silence	Richard Walker	
2008	The Baby Formula	Larry	
2009	Driven to Kill	Stephan Abramov	
2013	Separation	Geoffrey	
2025	Finch & Midland	Michael	

=== Television ===
Year	Title	Role	Notes
1995	Hawkeye	British soldier	"Amnesty"
1995	Marshall	David Brokerman	"Little Odessa"
1995	The X-Files	Lt. Richard Harper	"Død Kalm"
1996	Sweet Dreams	Ben	TV movie
1996	Madison	Claude	"No Sell Out"
1996	Strange Luck	"Account Manager"	"Blinded by the Sun"
1996	The X-Files	"Young Bill Mulder"	Apocrypha
1998	Cold Squad	Keith Harmon	"Marcey Bennett"
1998	Max Q	Kaysat controller	TV movie
1998	F/X: The Series	Sergei	"Evil Eye"
1998	The X-Files	Supervisor	"Folie a Deux"
1999	Atomic Train	NEST Man #3	Miniseries
1999	You, Me and the Kids	Director	"Hollywood Kids"
1999	The Net	Cal Hamilton	"Y2K: Total System Failure"
1999	The Sentinel	Rick Feldman	"Murder 101"
1999	Nothing Too Good for a Cowboy	Deaver	The Shape of Things to Come
2000	Higher Ground	Jeff Wilton	6 episodes
2000	Hollywood Off-Ramp		"TKO"
2000	So Weird	Derrick Larch	"Twin"
2000	Stargate SG-1	Boris	"Small Victories"
2001	My Husband's Double aka The Familiar Stranger	Rob Dusak	TV movie
2001	Dark Water	Spencer	TV movie
2001	Blue Murder	Graeme Cudmore	"Dr. Tara"
2002	Master Spy: The Robert Hanssen Story	Fatelov	(as Dmitri Chepovetsky) TV movie
2003	Spinning Boris	Courtyard guard	TV movie
2003	Haven		TV movie
2004	Sue Thomas: F.B.Eye	Sergei	"The Body Shop"
2004–2008	ReGenesis	49 episodes	Bob Melnikov
2005	Stargate SG-1	Russian soldier	"Full Alert"
2008, 2010, 2019 & 2020	Murdoch Mysteries	Nikola Tesla	"Power", "The Tesla Effect", "Murdoch and the Undetectable Man" & "Staring Blindly into the Future"
2010	Psych	James	"Death Is in the Air"
2010	Caprica	Crossdressing Cabaret Host	"Ghosts in the Machine"
2011	The Listener	Yuri Volkov	"The Brothers Volkov"
2011	Good Dog	Sales Clerk	"Gay Sopranos"
2011	The Kennedys	Kennedy's Translator	"On the Brink of War"
2011	CHAOS	Albert Boskiv	"Eaten by Wolves"
2011	Alphas	Gil	"A Short Time in Paradise"
2011	Supernatural	Nikolai Lishin	"The Mentalists"
2013	Air Crash Investigation	Captain Arkadiusz Protasiuk	"Death of the president" (S12:E10)
2017	Frankie Drake Mysteries	Mack Sennett	"Out of Focus" (S1:E5)
2021	Children Ruin Everything	Bo	Series regular

=== Theater ===
Year	Show	Role	Theater	Notes
1995	FETCH!		Men's Fest '95; Arts Club Revue '96, Liesl Lafferty	(Co-Writer, One Man Show)
1996	Orphan Muses	Brother Luc	Firehall Theatre, Burnaby; Touchstone Theatre	
1996	Basically Good Kids		Carousel Theatre, Vancouver	
1997	(Compared to This) Hell Will Be Sweet		Factory Theatre, Toronto	
1999	Bloodline	Papa	Foursight Theatre, England; Vancouver East Cultural Centre	collaborated as writer/lead performer/producer
1999	El Salvador	Skee	Vancouver East Cultural Centre	
2000	As Bees in Honey Drown	Kaden	Vancouver East Cultural Centre, Western Theatre Conspiracy Production	
2000	Bodyblood		Vancouver East Cultural Centre	collaborated as writer/creator
2000	The Festivities	Kuzma Nikolayevich Heerin	Rushin Productions	
2001	Unidentified Human Remains...	David	Vancouver Fringe 2001	
2002	Slip Knot	Jonathan	Factory Theatre, Toronto	
2002	The Danish Play, Extra Space	Michael	Tarragon Theatre, Toronto; Nightwood Theatre Production	
2003	Remnants	Joseph	Tarragon Theatre, Toronto	
2003	Top Gun! The Musical	Maverick	Factory Theatre, Toronto; NY Musical Theatre Festiva	
2004	The Trials of John Demjanjuk: A Holocaust Cabaret	Ivan the Terrible	Theatre Asylum, Studio Theatre, Harbourfront Centre, Toronto	(title role)
2006	The Catering Queen	Caterer	Tarragon Theatre, Toronto	
2007	Blind Submission: Reliving the Exquisite Corpse		Chaos Collective, The Theatre Centre, Toronto	(created and performed)
2007	Dish		Factory Theatre, Toronto	
2008	Beyond Mozambique	Tomas	Factory Theatre, Toronto	
2008	Room to Panic		The Annex at La MaMa ETC, New York	

== Awards and nominations ==
Year	Award	Type	Production	Theatre/Producer
1996	Jessie Richardson Theatre Award	Best Production	Orphan Muses	Touchstone Theatre
1996	Jessie Richardson Theatre Award	Ensemble Cast	Basically Good Kids	Green Thumb Theatre
1999	Jessie Richardson Theatre Award nomination	Outstanding Original Play	Bloodline	Kitchen Sink Kollective
2004	Dora Mavor Moore Award	Best Production	Remnants	Tarragon Theatre
2004	Dora Mavor Moore Award nomination	Outstanding Performance by a Male in a Principal Role Musical	Top Gun! The Musical	Nightwood Theatre
2004	Canadian Comedy Award nomination	Pretty Funny Comedic Play	Top Gun! The Musical	Nightwood Theatre
2005 & 2007	Gemini Award nomination	Best Performance by an Actor in a Featured Supporting Role in a Dramatic Series	ReGenesis	Shaftesbury Films
2008	Gemini Award nomination	Best Performance by an Actor in a Guest Role in a Dramatic Series	Murdoch Mysteries: Power	Shaftesbury Films
2025	Canadian Screen Awards nomination	Best Ensemble Performance in a Comedy	Children Ruin Everything	Bell Media Studios
