= William Kirkpatrick McNaught =

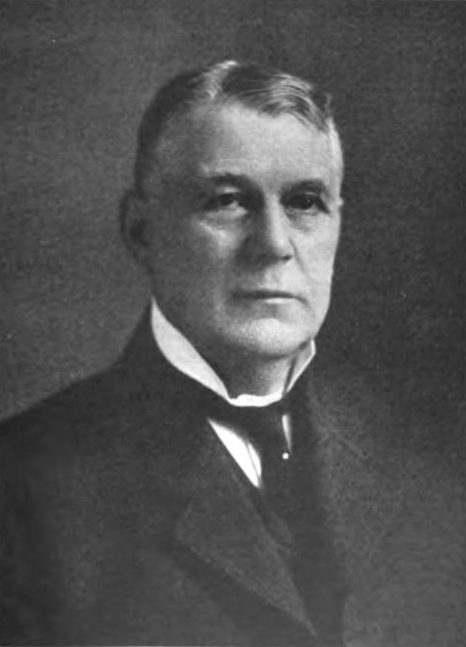

Ontario MPP
- In office 1905-1914
- Preceded by: William Beattie Nesbitt
- Succeeded by: Riding abolished
- Constituency: Toronto North (Note: Represented Seat A from 1908 after riding started electing two members.)

Personal details
- Born: September 6, 1845 Fergus, Canada West
- Died: February 2, 1919 (aged 73) Toronto, Ontario
- Party: Conservative
- Spouse: Caroline Eliza Lugsdin
- Occupation: Businessman

Military service
- Allegiance: Canadian
- Branch/service: Royal Canadian Artillery
- Years of service: 1866-1919
- Rank: Colonel
- Unit: Queen's Own Rifles
- Commands: 12th York Rangers
- Battles/wars: Fenian Raids, WWI

William Kirkpatrick McNaught CMG (September 6, 1845 – February 2, 1919) was an Ontario manufacturer and political figure. He represented Toronto North in the Legislative Assembly of Ontario from 1906 to 1914 as a Conservative member.

== Background ==
He was born in Fergus, Canada West, the son of John and Sarah McNaught who were Scottish immigrants. He attended schools in Brantford and also the Bryant and Stratton Commercial College in Toronto. He worked at a hardware store in Toronto and then apprenticed in jewelry and silverware wholesale before establishing a jewelry wholesale company with a partner. In 1873, he married Caroline Eliza Lugsden. McNaught later became president of the American Watch Glass Company of Toronto. He also served as president of the Canadian Manufacturers' Association and was president for the Canadian National Exhibition from 1901 to 1905.

In 1866 he enlisted in the Queen's Own Rifles where he participated in the Fenian Raids. He rose to the rank of Color-Sergeant. He later joined the 12th York Rangers as a lieutenant. By 1914 he had risen to the rank of Colonel and he offered his services to the war office at the outbreak of World War I. Being too old to serve overseas, he worked in various roles at the headquarters in Ottawa involving land transportation, recruitment and outfitting of new units including the 109th Toronto militia regiment and the 84th and 169th overseas battalions.

He was appointed C.M.G. in the 1914 Birthday Honours.

== Politics ==
McNaught was elected in a by-election after his predecessor William Nesbitt resigned. He defeated the Liberal candidate Thomas Urquhart who was the mayor of Toronto by 1,301 votes. He was re-elected in 1908 along with John Shaw when the riding started electing two members. He remained in office until 1914.

=== Toronto North election results ===
By-election, February 22, 1906
Party	Candidate	Votes	Vote %
Conservative	William McNaught	3,819	57.9
Liberal	Thomas Urquhart	2,518	38.2
Socialist	James Simpson	260	3.9
	Total	6,597	

=== Toronto North (Seat A) election results ===
1908 Ontario general election
Party	Candidate	Votes	Vote %
Conservative	William McNaught	6,346	88.0
Labour	Mr. Hevey	519	7.2
Socialist	Mr. Lindala	347	4.8
	Total	7,212	

1911 Ontario general election
Party	Candidate	Votes	Vote %
Conservative	William McNaught	5,110	79.8
Labour	W. Stephenson	1,295	20.2
	Total	6,405	
