= Toronto North (provincial electoral district) =

Ontario electoral district
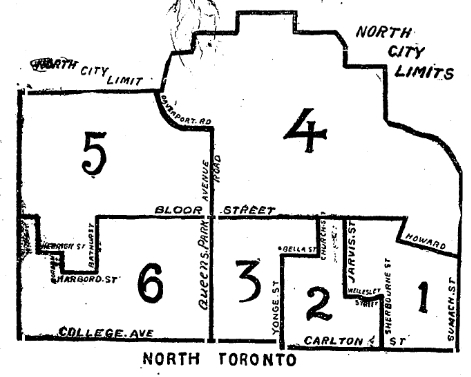
- Toronto North riding, created in 1894

Defunct provincial electoral district
- Legislature: Legislative Assembly of Ontario
- District created: 1894
- District abolished: 1914
- First contested: 1894
- Last contested: 1911

Toronto North, also known as North Toronto, was a provincial riding that was created in Toronto, Ontario in 1894. It was in use until 1914.

From 1894 to 1908 it elected a single MLA. In the 1908-1914 period it elected two members.

Prior to Toronto North's creation in 1894, the City of Toronto was represented as one single district that elected three members. In 1894 this district was split into four parts of which Toronto North was one. Toronto North occupied the northern part of the old Toronto district.

In 1914 the North Toronto district was abolished. The districts of Toronto East, Toronto North, Toronto South and Toronto West were replaced by Toronto Northeast, Toronto Northwest, Toronto Southwest and Toronto Southeast, which were constituted as two-member districts. Parkdale and Riverdale were created as single-member constituencies.

== Boundaries ==
The riding was established in 1894. The boundaries were College Street and Carlton Street to the south, Sumach Street to the east and Palmerston Avenue to the west. It was bounded on the north by the city limits.

In 1914, the district was split between the new ridings of Toronto Northeast and Toronto Northwest.

== Members of Provincial Parliament ==
Parliament	Years	Member	Party
Riding established in 1894 from the riding of Toronto
8th	1894–1898	George Marter	Conservative
9th	1898–1902	George Marter	Conservative
10th	1902–1905	Beattie Nesbitt (Note: Resigned February 6, 1906, to accept position as registrar of West Toronto.)	Conservative
11th	1905–1906	Beattie Nesbitt	Conservative
11th	1906–1908	William McNaught	Conservative
Seat A
12th	1908–1911	William McNaught	Conservative
13th	1911–1914	William McNaught	Conservative
Seat B
12th	1908–1911	John Shaw	Conservative
13th	1911–1914	J.J. Foy	Conservative
		Sourced from the Ontario Legislative Assembly	
Split into Toronto Northeast and Toronto Northwest ridings after 1914

== Election results ==
1894 Ontario general election
Party	Candidate	Votes	Vote %
Conservative	George Marter	4,008	56.0
Liberal	Joseph Tait	3,154	44.0
	Total	7,162	

1898 Ontario general election
Party	Candidate	Votes	Vote %
Conservative	George Marter	3,493	50.1
Liberal	Hartley Dewart	3,476	49.9
	Total	6,969	

1902 Ontario general election
Party	Candidate	Votes	Vote %
Conservative	Beattie Nesbitt	3,693	51.0
Independent	George Marter	3,461	47.8
Canadian Socialist League	Margaret Haile	74	1.0
Liberal	Mr. Tripp	20	0.3
	Total	7,248	

1905 Ontario general election
Party	Candidate	Votes	Vote %
Conservative	Beattie Nesbitt	5,163	56.4
Liberal	Hugh Blain	3,780	41.3
Socialist	James Simpson	211	2.3
	Total	4,949	

By-election, February 22, 1906
Party	Candidate	Votes	Vote %
Conservative	William McNaught	3,819	57.9
Liberal	Thomas Urquhart	2,518	38.2
Socialist	James Simpson	260	3.9
	Total	6,597	

=== Seat A ===
1908 Ontario general election
Party	Candidate	Votes	Vote %
Conservative	William McNaught	6,346	88.0
Labour	Mr. Hevey	519	7.2
Socialist	Mr. Lindala	347	4.8
	Total	7,212	

1911 Ontario general election
Party	Candidate	Votes	Vote %
Conservative	William McNaught	5,110	79.8
Labour	W. Stephenson	1,295	20.2
	Total	6,405	

=== Seat B ===
1908 Ontario general election
Party	Candidate	Votes	Vote %
Conservative	John Shaw	4,176	52.1
Liberal	Mr. Hossack	3,643	45.5
Socialist	James Simpson	190	2.4
	Total	8,008	

1911 Ontario general election
Party	Candidate	Votes	Vote %
Conservative	J.J. Foy	3,754	53.6
Liberal	Joseph Oliver	3,070	43.9
Socialist	James Richards	174	2.5
	Total	6,998	
