= Sarah Manninen =

Canadian actress (born 1976)

- Born: November 6, 1976 (age 49); Waterloo, Regional Municipality of Waterloo, Ontario
- Occupation: Film/television/stage actress
- Years active: 1999–present

Sarah Manninen (born November 6, 1976) is a Canadian film, television and stage actress, better known for her appearances on film The Prince and Me and series The Line.

== Career ==
A Finnish Canadian, Manninen graduated from Resurrection Catholic Secondary School in Kitchener, Regional Municipality of Waterloo, Ontario, in 1995, and from George Brown Theatre School. She has a degree in political science and belongs to the Liberal Party of Canada.

She was nominated for a Gemini Award for the BBC/CTV film Aka Albert Walker.

Select theatre credits include, Amiel Gladstone's The Wedding Pool (Belfry Theatre) and (Atelier du Rhin Théâtre de la Manufacture). George F. Walker's Better Living and Escape From Happiness (Factory Theatre) and David Rotenberg's production of The Dwarf (Equity Showcase Theatre).

== Filmography ==
Film
Year	Title	Role	Notes
2004	The Prince and Me	Krista	
2004	System of Units	Gert Hadley	Short film
2004	All You Got	Amy	
2004	Eternal	Wildcat	
2005	A Stranger Here Myself	Lucy	Short film
2005	Streets of Wonderland	Babysitter	
2006	Monkey Warfare	Bike Girl	
2008	Sigh	Maggie	Short film
2008	Never Forget	Natasha	
2009	Windigo Road		Video short
2010	In the Dominican	Mysterious Woman	Short film
2012	My Awkward Sexual Adventure	Rachel Stern	
2012	I'll Follow You Down	Avril	
2013	Separation	Liz	
2013	Empire of Dirt	Anna	
2013	Haunter	Olivia's Mother	
2013	Hunting Season	Katie	

Television
Year	Title	Role	Notes
1998	Power Play	May	Episode: "Changing the Luck"
1999	Power Play	May	Episode: "Family Values"
1999	Exhibit A: Secrets of Forensic Science	Rena Walker	Episode: "Dead Sea"
1999	Dear America: Dreams in the Golden Country	Helen Kern	TV short
1999	Animorphs	Anne	Episode: "Face Off: Part 1"; Episode: "Face Off: Part 2"
1999	The Hunt for the Unicorn Killer	British Girl (uncredited)	TV movie
1999	Dear America: The Winter of Red Snow	Helen Kern	TV short
2000	Live Through This	Lu Baker	TV movie
2000	Relic Hunter	Mrs. Peterson	Episode: "Affaire de Coeur"
2000	Live Through This	Lu Baker	TV series
2000	Code Name: Eternity	Hostess	Episode: "24 Hours"
2002	Aka Albert Walker	Helen Morrow	TV movie
2002	Martin and Lewis	Patti Lewis	TV movie
2003	Veritas: The Quest	Sophie St. John	Episode: "The Lost Codex"
2003	Platinum	Olivia Ross	TV series
2003	Wild Card	Jacquline	Episode: "Dearly Beloved"
2003	Beautiful Girl	Rachel Wasserman	TV movie
2004	Blue Murder	Janine	Episode: "Spooks"
2004	The Riverman	Georgia Hawkins	TV movie
2005	The Eleventh Hour	Samantha	Episode: "Kettle Black"
2005	This Is Wonderland	Belinda	Episode: "2.5"
2005	Burnt Toast	Tanya	TV movie
2006	Mayday	Katrina Stark	Episode: "Collision Course"
2006	Touch the Top of the World	Ellie	TV movie
2006	Naked Josh	Trish	5 episodes
2006	Angela's Eyes	Maureen Campbell	Episode: "Blue-Eyed Blues"
2006	Molly: An American Girl on the Home Front	Charlotte Campbell	TV movie
2008–2009	The Line	Lucie	15 episodes
2010	Republic of Doyle	Laura Dawe	Episode: "Fathers and Sons"
2010	Keep Your Head Up, Kid: The Don Cherry Story	Rose Cherry	TV miniseries
2010	When Love Is Not Enough: The Lois Wilson Story	Elise Shaw	TV movie
2010	NCIS	Hannah Gator	Episode: "Dead Air"
2011	The Edge of the Garden	Nora Hargrave	TV movie
2012	Wrath of Grapes: The Don Cherry Story II	Rose Cherry	TV miniseries
2012	Murdoch Mysteries	Verna Bowden	Episode: "Murdoch in Toyland"
2012	King	Vanessa Kaplan	Episode: "Justice Calvin Faulkner"
2012	Alphas	Becky	Episode: "When Push Comes to Shove"
2017	Alias Grace	Mrs. Humphrey	TV miniseries
