= Counting for Thunder =

- Directed by: Phillip Irwin Cooper
- Written by: Phillip Irwin Cooper
- Starring: Phillip Irwin Cooper
- Release date: May 2, 2017
- Running time: 103 minutes
- Country: United States
- Language: English

Counting for Thunder is a 2017 American romantic comedy-drama film written by, directed by and starring Phillip Irwin Cooper.

== Cast ==
- Phillip Irwin Cooper
- Mariette Hartley
- John Heard
- Peter Stebbings as Joe

== Release ==
The film was released on DVD and VOD on May 2, 2017.

== Reception ==
Leigh Monson of Substream Magazine awarded the film two stars out of five.
