= Peter Stebbings =

Canadian actor

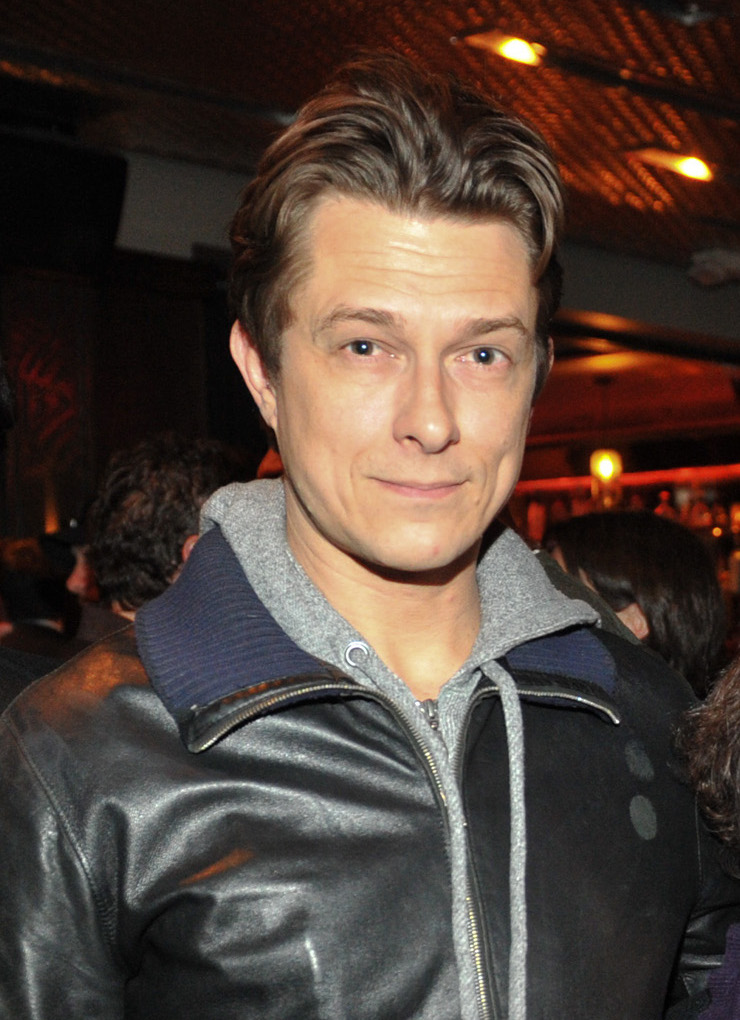
- Peter Stebbings in 2011
- Born: 1971 (age 54–55); Vancouver, British Columbia, Canada
- Occupations: Actor, film director, producer, screenwriter
- Years active: 1989–present
- Spouse: Charlotte Sullivan (m. 2010)
- Children: 1

Peter Stebbings is a Canadian actor, director, producer, and screenwriter best known for portraying Kevin Sharp in the drama series Madison, Paul Deeds in the series Traders, and for writing and directing Defendor. He portrayed Alvin Klein on the science fiction drama series The Listener.

== Life and career ==
Stebbings began acting at the age of 12 at the Vancouver Youth Theatre. At 22 he went to New York City to study at the Circle in the Square Theater School. Stebbings later returned to Canada, playing Kevin Sharp on the Canadian series Madison, a role that earned him two Gemini Award nominations as Best Actor in a Continuing Leading Dramatic Role. He also played Paul Deeds in the Canadian series Traders. He has a recurring role on the Canadian series Murdoch Mysteries as industrialist/inventor James Pendrick.

He is married to Charlotte Sullivan.

== Filmography ==
=== Film ===
Year	Film	Role	Notes
1991	Too Close for Comfort	David	
1997	Drive, She Said	Detective Eddie	
1998	Letting Go	Jeffery	
1999	Ruby Blue	Karl Blue	
2000	No Alibi	Phil Valenz	
2001	Picture Claire	Culver	
2001	On Their Knees	Sam Walker	
2002	Blue Boy and Girl in Pink	Lothario	
2002	K-19: The Widowmaker	Kuryshev	
2004	Re-Generation	Dr. Gabriel Goode	
2005	Kardia	Dad	
2006	Citizen Duane	Minister	
2007	Jack and Jill vs. the World	George	Also writer and associate producer
2008	Never Cry Werewolf	Jared	
2009	Defendor	Doctor	Also writer and director; Claude Jutra Award (Honourable Mention); Nominated - Genie Award for Best Screenplay, Original
2011	Immortals	Helios	
2013	Empire of Dirt		Director
2013	Separation	Jack	
2017	Counting for Thunder	Joe Tischman	
2020	Percy	Roger	

=== Television ===
Year	Show	Role	Notes
1989	Bordertown	Lamar Johnson	Episode: "Pretty Shadows"
1989	The Beachcombers	Cassidy	Episode: "The Sechelt Queen"
1990	21 Jump Street	Bill Godwin	Episode: "Just Say No! High"
1990, 1992	Neon Rider	Unknown	2 episodes
1992	Sexual Advances	Chris	TV movie
1993	Street Justice	Jeffrey	Episode: "Black or Blue"
1993	Family of Strangers	Young Del	TV movie
1993	Cobra	Kelso	Episode: "Hostage Hearts"
1993-1997	Madison	Kevin Sharpe	Main role; Nominated - Gemini Award for Best Performance by an Actor in a Continuing Leading Dramatic Role (1997 & 1998)
1994	The X-Files	Marty	Episode: "Gender Bender"
1996	Kung Fu: The Legend Continues	Jimmy	Episode: "Blackout"
1998	Welcome to Paradox	Paul	Episode: "The Girl Who Was Plugged In"
1998; 2000	The Outer Limits	Seth Todtman; Luke	Episode: "Final Exam"; Episode: "Revival"
1998; 2000	Traders	Paul Deeds	Recurring role
1999–2000	The Hoop Life	Peter Marr	Main role
2000	On Hostile Ground	George Regan	TV movie
2001	Relic Hunter	Tsarlov	Episode: "Run Sydney Run"
2001	Blue Murder	Kirk Mondragon	Episode: "Asylum"; Nominated - Best Performance by an Actor in a Guest Role in a Dramatic Series
2002	Cold Squad	Blaire McDonald	Episode: "The Shed"
2002	Stargate SG-1	Malek	2 episodes
2002–2004	Jeremiah	Markus Alexander	Main role
2003	Mutant X	Kristoff	Episode: "The Hand of God"
2004	The Eleventh Hour	Eco	Episode: "In Spite of All the Damage"
2007	Across the River to Motor City	Brett McNeal	Recurring role
2007–2008	Rabbit Fall	Harley McPherson	Main role
2008	Would Be Kings		Miniseries
2008	Flashpoint	Gerald Duglin	Episode: "Planets Aligned"
2009	G-Spot	Bill Wright	4 episodes
2009–2010	Cra$h & Burn	Lionel	Recurring role
2010–present	Murdoch Mysteries	James Pendrick	Recurring role
2011–2013	The Listener	Alvin Klein	Main role (seasons 2-4)
2013	The Borgias	Cardinal Giovanni Battista de Luca	4 episodes
2014	Crossbones	James Balfour	Recurring role

=== Director ===
Year	Title	Note(s)
2012–2014	The Listener	6 episodes
2014–2016	Saving Hope	4 episodes
2015	Rookie Blue	Episode: "Open Windows"
2015–2019	Killjoys	5 episodes
2016	Orphan Black	Episode: "From Instinct to Rational Control"
2016	Wynonna Earp	2 episodes
2017	The Disappearance	6 episodes
2018–2021	Frankie Drake Mysteries	4 episodes
2020	The Sounds	8 episodes
2021–2025	FBI: Most Wanted	7 episodes
2022	Ruby and the Well	2 episodes
2023	Transplant	Episode: "A Sort of Homecoming"
2024–2026	Law & Order Toronto: Criminal Intent	4 episodes
2025	FBI: International	Episode: "They May Get Their Wish"
2025	FBI	2 episodes
2025	Law & Order: Organized Crime	Episode: "He Was a Stabler"
2026	CIA	Episode: "Bridge of Lies"
2026	Anna Pigeon	2 episodes
