= Separation (2013 film) =

- Directed by: Greg White
- Written by: Greg White
- Produced by: Peter Apostolopoulos, Greg White
- Starring: Sarah Manninen, Peter Stebbings, Dmitry Chepovetsky
- Cinematography: Pasha Patriki
- Edited by: Jamie Franklin
- Production company: Birchmount Entertainment
- Distributed by: Gravitas Ventures
- Release date: April 15, 2013
- Running time: 81 minutes
- Country: Canada
- Language: English

Separation is a 2013 Canadian thriller film directed by Greg White and his feature film directorial debut. The film was released on video on demand on April 15, 2013 and stars Sarah Manninen and Peter Stebbings as a married couple struggling to save their lives as well as their marriage.

== Synopsis ==
Liz (Sarah Manninen) and Jack (Peter Stebbings) are a seemingly average couple that have moved into a new house in the hopes of rekindling their failing marriage. This effort is made more difficult by their troubled daughter Angie (Arcadia Kendal) and an unhappy mother-in-law (Barbara Gordon) that's determined to find fault in everything the couple does. When the family hears about a potential serial killer in the neighborhood, things begin to grow tense and they begin to suspect everyone around them- especially their strange neighbor Geoffrey (Dmitry Chepovetsky).

== Cast ==
- Sarah Manninen as Liz
- Peter Stebbings as Jack
- Dmitry Chepovetsky as Geoffrey
- Al Sapienza as Elliot
- Rob deLeeuw as Guy
- Barbara Gordon as Mom
- Arcadia Kendal as Angie

== Reception ==
Critical reception for Separation has been largely positive and Fearnet drew positive comparisons between the film and a Twilight Zone episode. Much of the film's praise centered on its acting and pacing, as multiple reviewers felt that the slow development in the film heightened the story's tension. Bloody Disgusting gave the film a positive rating and stated that it "has as a solid story and the leads carry the movie through its rough patches".
