= Margaret Haile =

Canadian journalist, educator and socialist

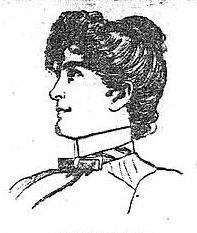
- Margaret Haile in campaign material for the 1902 Ontario election
- Born: Unknown; Canada
- Died: Unknown
- Occupations: Journalist, educator, socialist activist
- Years active: 1894–1902: Canadian Socialist League; Social Democratic Party (United States)
- Known for: First woman to run for legislative office in Canada
- Political party: Canadian Socialist League: Member, unity committee forming the Socialist Party of America
- Movement: Democratic socialism

Margaret Haile (fl. 1894–1902) was a Canadian socialist in the late nineteenth and early twentieth centuries, and journalist by profession. She was active in the socialist movements in both Canada and the United States. Frederic Heath's "Socialism in America", published in January 1900 in the Social Democracy Red Book, lists her, along with Corinne Stubbs Brown and Eugene V. Debs, among "One Hundred Well-known Social Democrats".

== Biography ==
Most likely born in Canada, Haile spent some time working for socialist causes in New England. A resident of Massachusetts in 1901, Haile was a member of the nine member unity committee of the Chicago faction of the Social Democratic Party as it planned the formation of the Socialist Party of America. She was one of two women on that body.

Haile returned to Canada shortly thereafter, and became in 1902 the first woman to run for legislative office in Canada, when she was nominated on the platform of the Canadian Socialist League as a candidate in Toronto North in the 1902 Ontario provincial election. Although her nomination was accepted and she received 79 votes, a woman was not eligible to sit as a member of the Legislative Assembly. She may have been the first woman to run for major elected office within the British Empire.

== In popular culture ==
Haile appears regularly during Season 8 of the Canadian television period detective series Murdoch Mysteries. Her final appearance is in "Election Day" (March 23, 2015), episode 17 of season 8, where Haile and her suffragette supporters insist that her name be on the ballot alongside George Marter and Dr. Beattie Nesbitt for the Toronto North riding during the 1902 Ontario general election. Haile is played by Nicole Underhay.
