= George Frederick Marter =

Politician in the Canadian province of Ontario

The Honourable George Frederick Marter

Leader of the Ontario Conservative Party
- In office 1894–1896
- Preceded by: William Ralph Meredith
- Succeeded by: James P. Whitney

Ontario MPP
- In office 1894–1902
- Preceded by: New riding
- Succeeded by: William Beattie Nesbitt
- Constituency: Toronto North
- In office 1886–1894
- Preceded by: Jacob William Dill (Note: Riding formerly named Muskoka and Parry Sound.)
- Succeeded by: George Langford
- Constituency: Muskoka

Personal details
- Born: 6 June 1840 Brantford, Upper Canada
- Died: May 10, 1907 (aged 66) Toronto, Ontario
- Party: Conservative 1886–1894, Independent 1902
- Occupation: Businessman

George Frederick Marter (6 June 1840 – 10 May 1907) was a politician in the province of Ontario, Canada. He led the Ontario Conservative Party from 1894 to 1896. Marter and Patrick Brown are the only permanent Ontario Conservative leaders who did not lead the party into an election.

== Early career ==
After graduating from grammar school in Brantford Marter became a merchant and county councillor in Norfolk County, but later moved to operate a general store Bracebridge, Ontario.

== Politics ==
Marter was elected for the riding of Muskoka from 1886 to 1894 and Toronto North from 1894 to 1902.

In 1894, Marter became Conservative leader following William Ralph Meredith's acceptance of the position of Chief Justice of the Common Pleas. The Conservative Party he led was aligned with the Protestant Protective Association in the legislature, and was divided by religious conflict and narrow bigotry. Marter was essentially an interim leader.

In 1896, he was replaced as leader by James P. Whitney. He was defeated when he ran as an Independent in the 1902 election.

== Later life ==
Following his political career Marter became an insurance agent and manager of the London and Lancashire Insurance Company of Toronto and later co-founder of Marter Hall Company Limited with his son. Marter died in Toronto in 1907.

== Legacy ==
Marter Township in northeastern Ontario is named for him.

In "Election Day" (March 23, 2015), episode 17 of season 8 of the Canadian television period detective series Murdoch Mysteries, Marter and Dr. Beattie Nesbitt run alongside Margaret Haile for the Toronto North riding during the 1902 Ontario general election. Marter is played by Jeffrey Wetsch.
