= William Beattie Nesbitt =

Canadian politician

Member of the Legislative Assembly of Ontario for Toronto North
- In office 1902–1906
- Preceded by: George Marter
- Succeeded by: William McNaught

Personal details
- Born: May 23, 1866
- Died: January 31, 1913 (aged 46)
- Party: Conservative
- Relations: F.L. Nesbitt (father)
- Education: Victoria University; Johns Hopkins University
- Occupation: Physician, politician

William Beattie Nesbitt (May 23, 1866 – January 31, 1913) was an Ontario physician, manufacturer and political figure. He represented Toronto North in the Legislative Assembly of Ontario as a Conservative member from 1902 to 1906.

He was born in Vandecar, Oxford County, the son of F.L. Nesbitt. He studied medicine at Victoria University and Johns Hopkins University in Baltimore. He resigned from his seat in the Ontario assembly after being named registrar for West Toronto. He served as president of the Farmer's Bank of Canada and ran unsuccessfully for the mayoralty of Toronto.

Nesbitt died in Toronto at the age of 46 after an extended illness.
