= Yannick Bisson =

Canadian film and television actor

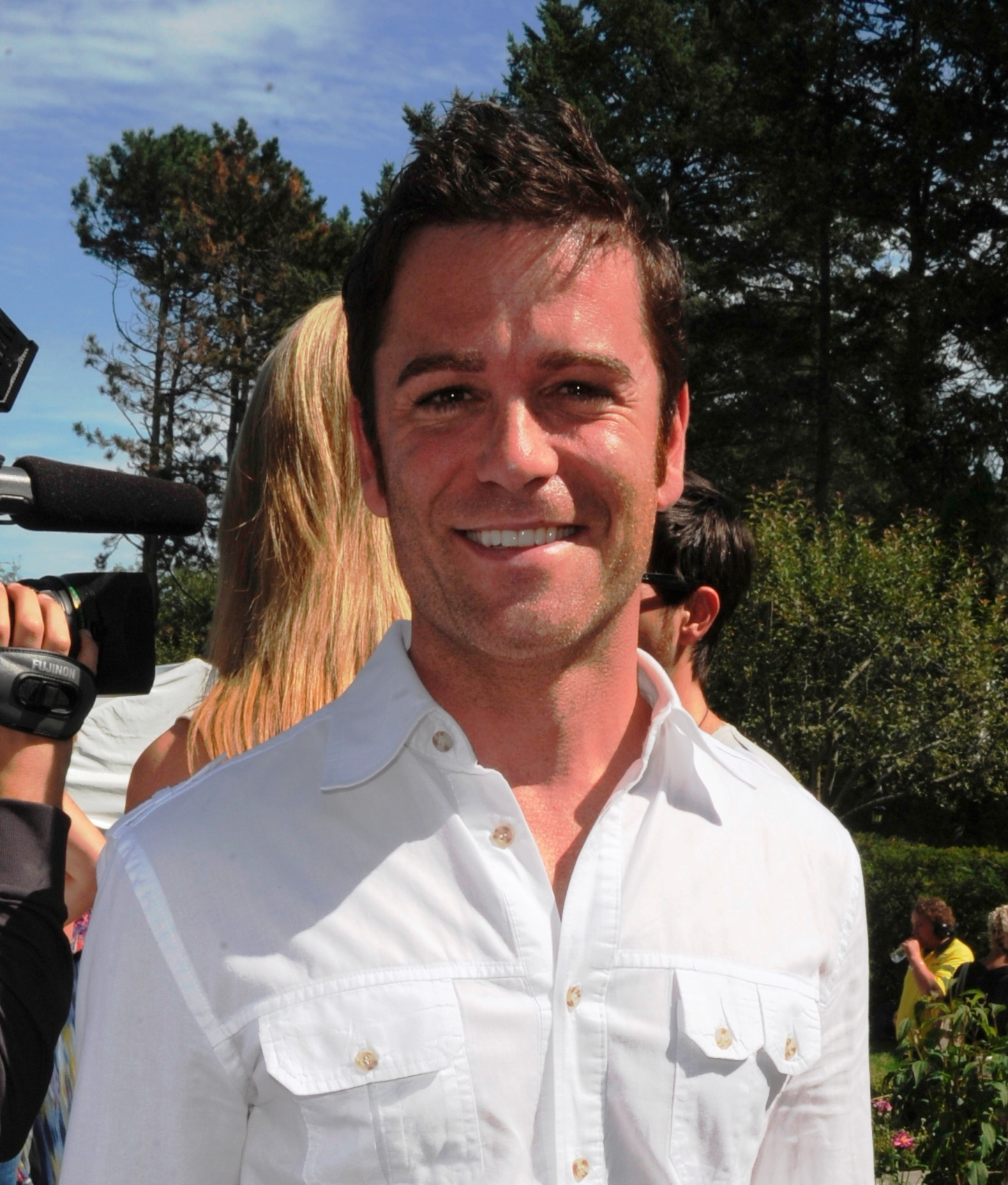
- Bisson in 2011
- Born: Yannick Denis Bisson; May 16, 1969 (age 57); Montreal, Quebec, Canada
- Occupations: Actor, director
- Years active: 1984–present
- Known for: Murdoch Mysteries
- Spouse: Shantelle Bisson (aka Chantal Craig) (m. 1990)
- Children: 3

Yannick Denis Bisson (born May 16, 1969) is a Canadian film and television actor and director. He is known for playing Detective William Murdoch on the series Murdoch Mysteries since 2008.

== Early life ==
Bisson was born in Montreal, Quebec, and is of French and English ancestry. He moved to Toronto, Ontario, as a teenager and his acting career began, when he was still in high school. His father, noting his son's interest in acting, encouraged him to reply to a newspaper advertisement seeking "child actors".

== Career ==
Bisson's first major role was in the 1984 CBC movie of the week Hockey Night, alongside Megan Follows and Rick Moranis. He starred in the Canadian television series Learning the Ropes from 1988 through 1989. From 1994 through 1997, he starred in the syndicated action series High Tide, co-starring Rick Springfield. He moved back from Los Angeles to Vancouver, British Columbia in 1998 when he was cast as the lead in CBC'S Nothing Too Good for a Cowboy. From 2000 though 2004, he had a recurring role as attorney Brian Tedrow on the Showtime drama Soul Food.

He starred as FBI agent Jack Hudson in the PAX TV series Sue Thomas: F.B.Eye and in the short-lived CBC drama Nothing Too Good for a Cowboy.

He appeared on Falcon Beach in Season 2 as well as in several Lifetime cable movies, such as Crazy for Christmas and I do (but I don't), and the Disney Channel movie Genius. Bisson was a guest star on Flashpoint and starred in the television movies Brothers by Choice and Keshan. He appeared as Jon in all of the Roxy Hunter movies to date. Bisson is featured in a series of commercials for CIBC. He starred in the 2001 TV movie Loves Music, Loves to Dance based on the book by Mary Higgins Clark. He provided the voice of Ferdie in the children's animated series Maxie's World.

Bisson plays the lead in the CBC Television drama series Murdoch Mysteries and made his directorial debut with the show's fourth-season episode "Buffalo Shuffle".

Starting on December 30, 2013, Bisson starred as Mr. Anthony, a preschool teacher in The Adventures of Napkin Man on CBC Television.

Bisson played Martin Bartell in Hallmark Channel's Aurora Teagarden Mysteries. He is introduced in "Three Bedrooms, One Corpse" as a CIA agent Bartell who moves to town, falls in love with Teagarden, and later dates her. Bisson left the series in 2018 as his character does not feature in the later novels.

== Awards ==
Bisson was awarded the Fan's Choice Award at the 2016 Canadian Screen Awards on March 13, 2016. Murdoch Mysteries has been awarded several Canadian Screen Award Golden Screen Awards in 2017, 2018, and 2020.

Bisson received the ACTRA Toronto Award of Excellence in 2017 for his lifetime of work.

Bisson was the host of Discovery Canada Channel's Star Racer reality show.

== Personal life ==
Bisson is married to Chantal Craig, a former actress, model, Toronto Argonauts Cheerleader, and fitness instructor who currently works as a television content creator and writer.

The couple met in high school and married in 1990. They have three daughters: Brianna, Dominique, and Mikaela. Craig made guest appearances on two of Bisson's television series, Sue Thomas: F.B.Eye and Murdoch Mysteries. Their daughter played "Penny Renton" in an episode of Murdoch Mysteries entitled "Love and Human Remains." Dominique Bisson had a part as Gloria Abercrombie in an episode of Murdoch Mysteries, season 2, entitled "Snakes and Ladders". Craig is now known as Shantelle Bisson, a producer, author, parenting expert, and regular contributor to Zoomer Magazine. She is the owner of Shantilly's Place, a marina in Kawartha Lakes, Ontario.

Bisson is also an avid bicyclist and bicycle collector. He formerly worked as a builder between acting jobs to support his family.

== Filmography ==
=== Film ===
Year	Title	Role	Notes
1984	Hockey Night	Spear Kozak	
1986	Toby McTeague	Toby	
1986	My Pet Monster	Rod	Video
1986	Where's Pete	Pete	Short
1999	Velocity Trap	Franklin J. Robinson	
2004	Some Things That Stay	Dr. Ostrum	
2005	Crazy For Christmas	Peter Archer	
2008	Animal 2	Dillen	
2008	Nothing Really Matters	Leo	
2010	Casino Jack	Oscar Carillo	
2012	Your Side of the Bed	Steve	
2016	Static	Billy	Short
2016	Year by the Sea	Cahoon	
2016	Another WolfCop	Swallows	
2018	Hellmington	Professor Freeborn	
2020	Anything for Jackson	Rory	
2020	A Perfect Plan	Gerry	

=== Television ===
Year	Title	Role	Notes
1984	Hockey Night	Spear Kozak	TV film
1986	Brothers by Choice	Scott	TV film
1986–88	Danger Bay	Larry / Todd	2 episodes
1987	First Offender	Jeff	TV film
1987	Night Heat	Regan	Episode: "The Kid"
1987	Maxie's World	Ferdie (voice)	
1988	Alfred Hitchcock Presents	Ty	Episode: "Twisted Sisters"
1988	Learning the Ropes	Mark Randall	Main role, 13 episodes
1989	Pray for Me, Paul Henderson	Mike Stanoulis	
1989	Rookies	Corey	
1989	Street Legal	Lennie Smith	Episode: "Complex Offer"
1991	Gold: The World's Play	Johnny	TV film
1991	Gold: The Merchants of Venice	Johnny	TV film
1991	Gold: The Dynamiters	Johnny	TV film
1991	Gold: Frenchie's Gold	Johnny	TV film
1991	Gold: A Fistful of Gold	Johnny	TV film
1991–93	The Hidden Room	John / Glenn	2 episodes
1992	Tropical Heat	Harry Jr.	Episode: "Double Fault"
1992	The Ray Bradbury Theater	Roger (ages 18–22)	Episode: "Some Live Like Lazarus"
1992	Catwalk	Nick	Episode: "Here Today"
1993	Matrix	Rick Beals	Episode: "Blindside"
1993	Top Cops	Mike Sheehan	Episode: "Craig Gravel and Jerry Jones/Mike Sheehan and Stephen Davis"
1994	The Forget-Me-Not Murders	Greg Gale	TV film
1994–97	High Tide	Joey Barrett	Main role, 63 episodes
1995	Young at Heart	Joey	TV film
1999	Genius	Mike MacGregor	TV film
1999	Relic Hunter	Stavros Vordalos	Episode: "Myth of the Maze"
1999–2000	Nothing Too Good for a Cowboy	Richmond P. Hobson Jr.	Main role, 26 episodes
2000	The Moving of Sophia Myles	Rev. Young	TV film
2000–04	Soul Food	Brian Tedrow	Recurring role, 14 episodes
2001	The Pretender 2001	NSA Agent Edward Ballinger	TV film
2001	Twice in a Lifetime	Julian Fanshaw	Episode: "Mama Mia"
2001	Mutant X	Richard Saunders	Episode: "Fool for Love"
2001	Undergrads	Kruger / Stoner Dave (voice)	Recurring role, 10 episodes
2001	Loves Music, Loves to Dance	Charley / Paul Nash	TV film
2001	The Day Reagan Was Shot	Buddy Stein	TV film
2002–05	Sue Thomas: F.B.Eye	Jack Hudson	Main role, 56 episodes
2003	See Jane Date	Max Garrett	TV film
2003	Missing	Bruce Skeller	Episode: "Thin Air"
2003	Playmakers	Police Detective	Episode: "Choice: Part 1"
2004	I Do (But I Don't)	James "Jay" Corina	TV film
2005	Kevin Hill	Austin Brooks	Episode: "Sacrificial Lambs"
2005	Crazy for Christmas	Peter Archer	TV film
2006	The Secrets of Comfort House	Curtis	TV film
2007	Falcon Beach	Michael Prescott	4 episodes
2007	The Dresden Files	Sergeant Darren Munzer	Episode: "Second City"
2007	Roxy Hunter and the Mystery of the Moody Ghost	Jon Steadman	TV film
2008	Roxy Hunter and the Secret of the Shaman	Jon Steadman	TV film
2008	Roxy Hunter and the Myth of the Mermaid	Jon Steadman	TV film
2008	Roxy Hunter and the Horrific Halloween	Jon Steadman	TV film
2008	Urban Vermin	No-neck	2 episodes
2008–present	Murdoch Mysteries	Det. William Murdoch	Main role, 155 episodes Produced 75 episodes Directed six episodes Nominated – ACTRA Award for Outstanding Performance – Ensemble (2017)
2009	Too Late to Say Goodbye	Bobby Corbin	TV film
2010	Flashpoint	Philip Sobol	Episode: "Jumping at Shadows"
2011	The Listener	Keith Shelton	Episode: "Vanished"
2012	My Mother's Secret	Dennis Coulson	TV film
2012	Beauty and the Beast	Alex Webster	Episode: "Pilot"
2012	Royal Canadian Air Farce	Det. William Murdoch	Episode: "Air Farce New Year's Eve 2012"
2013	This Hour Has 22 Minutes	Himself	Guest host Season 20 episode 18
2013–14	The Adventures of Napkin Man!	Napkin Man; Mister Anthony; Mister Newman	Main role, 52 episodes Co-executive produced 14 episodes Won – Canadian Screen Award for Best Host in a Pre-School, Children's or Youth Program or Series (2015)
2014	Republic of Doyle	Det. Bill Murdoch	Episode: "If the Shoe Fits"
2016	Three Bedrooms, One Corpse: An Aurora Teagarden Mystery	Martin Bartell	TV film
2016	The Julius House: An Aurora Teagarden Mystery	Martin Bartell	TV film
2017	Dead Over Heels: An Aurora Teagarden Mystery	Martin Bartell	TV film
2017	A Bundle of Trouble: An Aurora Teagarden Mystery	Martin Bartell	TV film
2018	Last Scene Alive: An Aurora Teagarden Mystery	Martin Bartell	TV film
