= Cruel but Necessary =

- Directed by: Saul Rubinek
- Written by: Wendel Meldrum
- Produced by: Elinor Reid
- Starring: Wendel Meldrum; Mark Humphrey; Luke Humphrey
- Cinematography: Steve Ackerman
- Edited by: Chris Kern
- Distributed by: Somerville House; Critical Mass
- Release date: June 7, 2005
- Running time: 92 minutes
- Country: United States
- Language: English

Cruel but Necessary is a 2005 independent film directed by Canadian actor/film director Saul Rubinek. Actress Wendel Meldrum took a turn as a screenwriter for this project. Meldrum stars in the film as Betty Munson, a woman struggling to put her life back together after her marriage falls apart. Betty decides to secretly videotape family, friends, and others to help understand the truth of her life. Meldrum's own ex-husband Mark Humphrey and son Luke Humphrey play her onscreen ex-husband and son.

Portions of Cruel but Necessary were posted on YouTube beginning in 2007. The film was released on DVD November 11, 2008.

== Cast ==
- Wendel Meldrum as Betty Munson
- Mark Humphrey as Doug Munson
- Luke Humphrey as Darwin Munson
- Fred Goss as Chad
- James O'Connell as Teddy
- Julie Payne as Pearl
- Lisa Zane as Gynecologist

== Awards ==
Outstanding Actress in a Female Role, Wendel Meldrum - 2007 Winnipeg International Film Festival.
