= Still Small Voices =

2007 Canadian Movie

- Directed by: Mario Azzopardi
- Written by: Jolene Rice
- Produced by: David Perlmutter; Lewis Chesler; Julie Glucksman; Robert O. Green; Marek Posival; Robert Vaughn
- Starring: Catherine Bell; Mark Humphrey; Damir Andrei; Deborah Grover; George Buza
- Cinematography: Michael Storey
- Production companies: Chesler/Perlmutter Productions; Granada America
- Release date: January 6, 2007
- Running time: 90 minutes
- Country: Canada
- Language: English

Still Small Voices is a 2007 Canadian mystery film written by Jolene Rice and directed by Mario Azzopardi, starring Catherine Bell and Mark Humphrey. The film premiered on Lifetime Movie Network on January 6, 2007.

== Plot ==
Michael Summer is a 911 dispatcher who lives with her husband, Ash, a doctor. The only other person in her life is her mother, Anne Hartley. Michael suffers from recurring nightmares involving a dangerous-looking man attempting to break through a door, alongside visions of a young girl in a blue dress.

One day, Michael receives a silent 911 call. From the background noise, she determines that the caller is a child trapped in a building on fire. She dispatches an emergency unit to the address displayed on her monitor, but the address suddenly vanishes from the system, and the police are unable to locate the site. Michael's supervisor later informs her that there is no official record of the call and advises her to take a medical leave. Meanwhile, Dr. Elaine discovers that Michael has a brain aneurysm. Unable to reach Michael by phone, Elaine informs Ash, who works at the same hospital.

As characters from her nightmares begin appearing to her in real life, Michael becomes convinced the phenomena are tied to her stillborn daughter, Emma. Leaving her cellphone behind, she sets out to locate the address from the 911 call, guided by clues from her visions of the girl in the blue dress. Her search leads her to the small town of Starlight. Ash tracks her down using credit card records and informs her about the aneurysm. Refusing to believe her visions are merely medical hallucinations, Michael pursues the apparition of the young girl. The spirit leads her to a house with handprint stepping stones in the backyard, revealing that the girl in her visions is Carrie Waiverly, a six-year-old who disappeared thirty years prior, in 1978.

Michael meets Carrie's parents, Henry and Silva Waiverly, who tell her that Carrie drowned in a nearby lake. However, Bud Atherton, the editor of the town newspaper, reveals that Carrie's body was never recovered. Michael then experiences visions of a second girl who died in a garage fire around the same time, alongside Terrance Reed, the menacing man from her nightmares. Convinced that Carrie was also present at the fire, Michael interrogates Burton Hayes, an arsonist currently in prison. Hayes confesses to abducting Carrie and taking her to the garage.

Because Carrie's body was never found in the debris, Michael deduces that she escaped. Checking local hospital records from 1978, she discovers that a mute young girl was admitted at the time, but her identity was never established. The records indicate that the girl was slated to be transferred to St. Theresa's, a psychiatric facility. Her caseworker vehemently opposed the transfer and resigned in protest; Michael discovers the caseworker was her own mother, Anne Hartley.

Michael confronts Anne, who admits that she could not bear to see the child sent to an institution. Anne took the girl home and raised her as her own daughter, revealing to Michael that she is actually Carrie Waiverly. The revelation triggers Michael's repressed memories: she remembers that Hayes was the arsonist, whereas Terrance Reed was actually a hero trying to rescue her. During the fire, the young Carrie had been unable to articulate that the other girl was already dead, prompting Reed to run back into the flames, where he perished.

Michael undergoes successful surgery for her aneurysm. During her recovery, she receives a package from Bud containing a newspaper feature he wrote about her story, along with a photograph of Reed in a Marine uniform. A note from Bud explains that Reed's name has been cleared, and he has been posthumously awarded a medal for his heroism in saving Carrie's life.

Michael reunites with her biological parents and reveals her true identity. Though initially skeptical, Henry and Silva are convinced when Michael recites a specific bedtime prayer they used to say to her: "It's time for small voices to be quiet and still. It's time for stars to give us a thrill. If you are afraid of the dark, just remember our prayer and when you open your eyes..."

A few years later, Michael, Ash, Anne, and the Waiverlys gather at the Waiverly home to celebrate the birthday of Michael and Ash's new daughter. In keeping with the family tradition, they create a new handprint stepping stone for the baby.

== Cast ==
- Catherine Bell as Michael Summer
- Mark Humphrey as Ash Summer
- Damir Andrei as Bud Atherton
- Deborah Grover as Anne Hartley
- George Buza as Wife Beater Terrance Reed
- Lawrence Dane as Henry Waiverly
- Barbara Gordon as Silva Waiverly
- Mimi Kuzyk as Dr. Elaine Trussle
- Eugene Clark as Sergeant Gillett
- Brian Kaulback as Delivery Doctor
- Emily Swiss as Carrie Waiverly
- Jason Barbeck as Orderly
- Colleen Williams as Alice Lipton
- James Downing as Prison Guard
- Charles Martin Smith as Burton Hayes
- Araby Lockhart as Older Woman
- Marcia Bennett as Diane
- Alan Catlin as Hospital Administrator
- Heidi Hayes as Lisa Pinkham
- Kendra Mio as Nellie Lipton

== Reception ==
On review aggregator website Rotten Tomatoes, the film holds a Popcornmeter rating of 70% based on 250 votes. Moria Reviews gave it 2 stars while describing it as routine film with an interesting twist.
