= Nothing Too Good for a Cowboy =

- Starring: Yannick Bisson; Sarah Chalke; Ted Atherton
- No. of seasons: 2

Original release
- Network: CBC
- Release: 1998 – 2000

Nothing Too Good for a Cowboy is a Canadian television drama series, which aired on CBC from 1998 to 2000. The series, which is set in the 1940s, was based on the memoirs of author and rancher Richmond P. Hobson, Jr. and set on a ranch in rural northern British Columbia.

The series began with a 1998 television film pilot directed by Kari Skogland, starring Chad Willett in the title role as Hobson, Sarah Chalke as his love interest and later wife Gloria McIntosh and Ted Atherton as his friend and business partner Panhandle Phillips, as well as Zachary Bennett, Robin Brûlé and Ryan Gosling in supporting roles. It then premiered as a weekly series in February 1999, with Yannick Bisson replacing Willett as Hobson while Chalke and Atherton continued to play the same roles. The series aired nine episodes in the winter and spring of 1999; although thirteen had been produced, the network's programming schedule was disrupted in the spring by a technician's strike which resulted in the season ending earlier than planned.

The series was renewed for a second season; it aired seventeen episodes, comprising the four leftover episodes from the first season and thirteen new episodes, between October 1999 and February 2000. The second season initially saw a significant ratings dropoff from the first, to which the CBC responded by scheduling one episode for a special airing in a prime family viewing spot on Sunday evening; the special airing doubled the ratings of the season's previous episodes and the show's ratings improved significantly in its regular time slot for the rest of the season.

The series was not renewed for a third season.

== Awards ==
The television film received a Gemini Award nomination to Danny Nowak for Best Photography in a Drama Program or Series at the 13th Gemini Awards in 1998.

At the 14th Gemini Awards in 1999, Sarah Strange received a nomination for Guest Performance by an Actress in a Drama Series, for the episode "Wild Horses", and Lorraine Carson received a nomination for Best Costume Design.

At the 15th Gemini Awards in 2000, Atherton was nominated for Best Actor in a Continuing Leading Dramatic Role and Chalke was nominated for Best Actress in a Continuing Leading Dramatic Role.
