= Tony Scherman =

Canadian painter (1950–2023)

Tony Scherman RCA
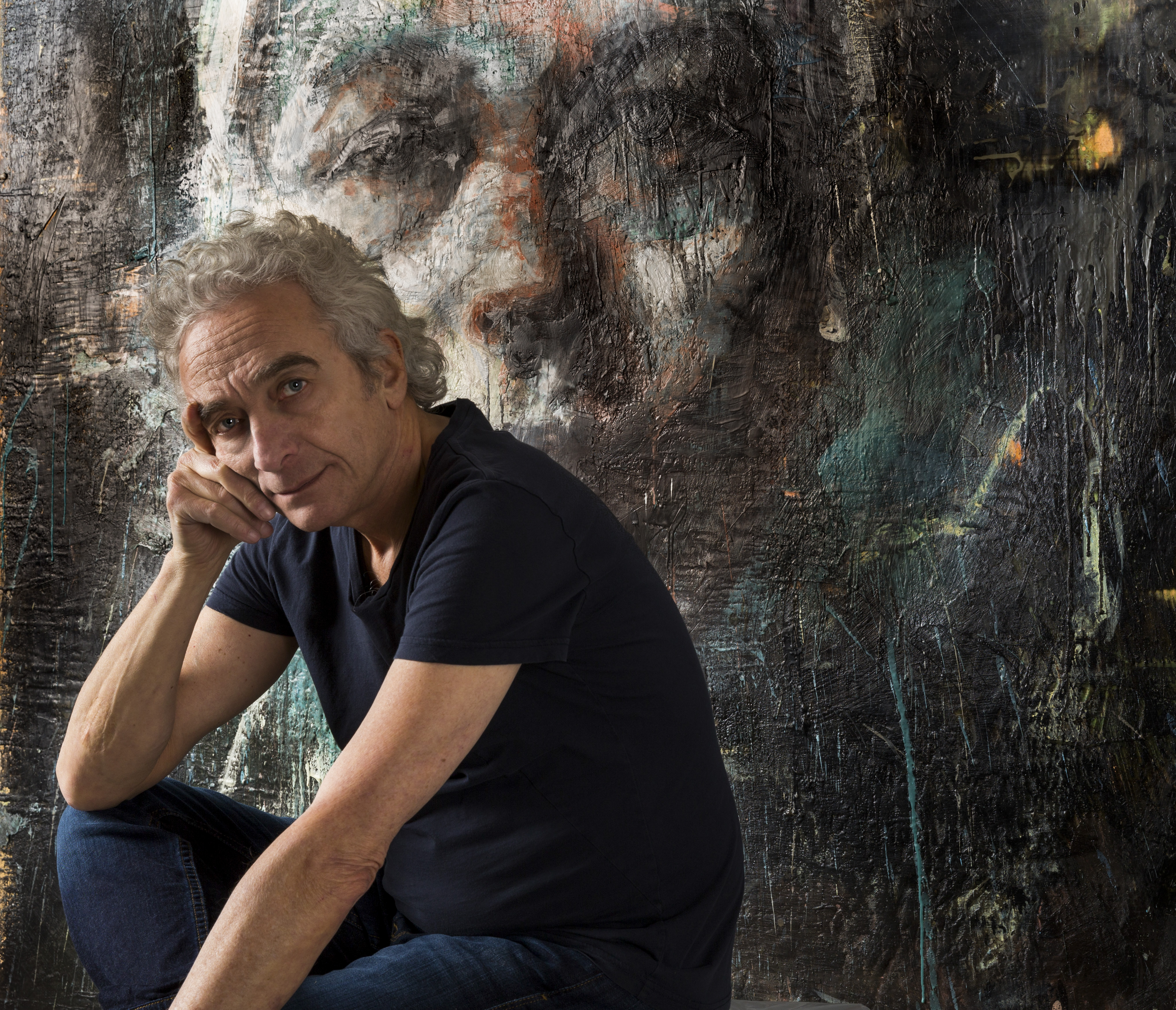
- Scherman in 2016
- Born: Antony Scherman; August 13, 1950; Toronto, Ontario, Canada
- Died: February 28, 2023 (aged 72); Toronto, Ontario, Canada
- Education: Royal College of Art
- Known for: Painting
- Spouse: Margaret Priest
- Children: 3, including Leo Scherman

Antony Scherman RCA (August 13, 1950 – February 28, 2023) was a Canadian painter. He was known for his use of encaustic and portraiture to depict events of historical, cultural and popular significance.

== Early life, education and career ==
Scherman was born in Toronto, but he grew up in Europe. His father and mother settled in Paris in 1955. Scherman's father, Paul Scherman, a conductor and violinist, relocated to London by 1958, and Tony Scherman arrived there by 1959 to live with his father.

After first attending the Byam Shaw School of Art, Scherman then went to the Royal College of Art and graduated with an MA in 1974. While at the Royal College of Art, Scherman was introduced to encaustic by his tutor, John Golding. The college acquired a painting for the collection from Scherman's thesis exhibition.

In 1976, he was included in the notable and controversial exhibition entitled "The Human Clay", organized by artist R.B. Kitaj for the Arts Council of Great Britain (now Arts Council England). Scherman was the youngest of the 48 artists, which included Frank Auerbach, Francis Bacon, David Hockney, Peter Blake and Henry Moore. The exhibition originated at the Hayward Gallery in London and then toured galleries in England, Wales, Scotland and Belgium.

== Return to Canada ==
Scherman returned to Toronto in 1976 with his wife, British artist Margaret Priest. He was soon recognized as an emerging artist with a growing international presence. He continued to be based in Toronto with more than 100 solo exhibitions in Canada, the United States, England and Europe and has been a visiting lecturer at numerous universities, art schools and public galleries in England, Canada and the United States since the mid-1970s. Scherman was a sessional instructor at the University of Guelph Department of Fine Art and an adjunct professor at the University of Toronto School of Architecture and Landscape Architecture in the 1980s and 1990s.

In 1987, he was one of 48 Canadian artists commissioned by the Cineplex Odeon Corporation for works to be installed in cinema complexes in Canada and the United States. His 5.18 metre wide painting The Comfort of Food was installed at the Cinemas in Oakbrook a suburb of Chicago. Scherman was part of the competition team for the Toronto public commission Cloud Gardens in the 1990s. In 2015, Scherman was commissioned by Western University to paint the portrait of former Chancellor Joseph Rotman. His painting Poseidon, 2007, is featured on the cover of Dr. Gerald Cupchik's book The Aesthetics of Emotion, Up the Down Staircase of the Mind-Body. In 2005, Scherman was elected to the Royal Canadian Academy of Arts.

== Death ==
Scherman died from cancer on February 28, 2023, at the age of 72.

== Artistic practice and themes ==
Scherman's work considers the human condition in paintings and works on paper that are done in thematic series. These visual investigations are drawn from the mythologies of antiquity, the narratives and characters of the Shakespearean tragedies, Hamlet and Macbeth, and historical events that have formed and shaped the world today. Scherman, however, does not rely on illustrating dramatic moments, a characteristic of history painting, but employs a range of subject matter—portraits, animals, flowers and food—as stand-ins and visual metaphor, and imagining what is not written. His Macbeth paintings from the mid-1990s were given the series title Banquo’s Funeral. While Banquo was murdered in Shakespeare's play, the funeral was not written in. Curator Karen Antaki wrote: "Scherman suspends the…narrative frame and proceeds to invent his own meta-text and to plot its wayward course."

=== About 1789, Chasing Napoleon and Unthinkable Thoughts ===
In the late 1990s, Scherman addressed the social and political upheaval of the French Revolution, which he titled About 1789. As with his mythology and literature sources, Scherman created a meta-text through images in order to present a visual language beyond dramatic moments. In contrast to Eugène Delacroix's 1830 heroic-image painting Liberty Leading the People, Scherman devised Jacques: The New Boss, which depicts a rooster in front of a black background. The rooster is an old Gallic symbol revived to express national resurgence during The French Revolution and now the unofficial national symbol of France. This cycle of paintings and works on paper culminated in the exhibition Chasing Napoleon. The architects and minor figures of the First French Empire, Napoleonic France and the Third Reich were intertwined in a narrative of tyranny, ambitions and inflicted suffering. Critic Jacques Henric underscored the complexities of About 1789 and Chasing Napoleon: "The French Revolution is not only the preparation, the dress rehearsal and the quintessence of what would constitute the horrible grandeur and the superb infamy of the centuries that followed [but also the] perfectly monstrous utopia that the 20th century would attempt to bring about: to make a new mankind."

Scherman expressed the horror of the Third Reich in a painting with a horse subject for Oradour. A horse is depicted grazing in a meadow but the title refers to the massacre of French civilians by the German Waffen-SS in 1944, but as Scherman has noted, the painting's significance is absent if the massacre is not known by a viewer; "the panting's meaning is that it’s just a horse painting [and that] happens with all art all the time." The Chasing Napoleon exhibition was organized by Curatorial Assistance Travelling Exhibitions and toured to public galleries in the United States and Canada in 2001–2002.

A related exhibition Unthinkable Thoughts, with a focus on works on paper, circulated to galleries in Canada in 2004–2007.

=== About 1865 ===
Scherman's 2007 historical painting series addressed the American Civil War. Critic Lilly Wei wrote that Scherman chose the conflict because "it was the first war fought on moral terms…an ethical war and a necessary work, premised on the belief that slavery was a non-negotiable evil." As with his previous series, there are portraits, animals and food and imagined moments; several works are titled “The Dreams of Robert E. Lee." Lee was the commander of the Confederate States Army.

=== The Blue Highway and Difficult Women ===
Portraiture has been a critical aspect of Tony Scherman's painting series. For The Blue Highway, 1999–2002, he worked from photograph sources to depict celebrities who died young and under tragic circumstances. Three of the subjects were musician and performers Jim Morrison, Elvis Presley, and Kurt Cobain. The subjects for Difficult Women came from diverse walks of life, historical to contemporary, including activists, philosophers, political figures, athletes and celebrities. Scherman stated that the term "difficult" "is often reserved for women of principle and determination; it is rarely applied to men".

== Public collections ==
=== England ===
- Arts Council England;
- Contemporary Arts Society, London
- Royal College of Art, London;
- Salford Museum;

=== Europe ===
- Centre Pompidou, Paris;
- FRAC Ile-de-France, Paris;
- Lieu d’art contemporain, Sigean, France;
- Schlossmuseum Murnau, Germany
- Fundación Privada Sorigué, Lleida, Spain;

=== United States, selected ===
- High Museum Atlanta;
- Hunter Museum;
- Johnson Museum of Art, Cornell University;
- San Diego Museum of Art;
- Williams College Museum of Art;

=== Canada, selected ===
- Agnes Etherington Art Centre, Kingston;
- Art Gallery of Alberta, Edmonton;
- Art Gallery of Greater Victoria;
- Art Gallery of Hamilton;
- Art Gallery of Nova Scotia, Halifax;
- Art Gallery of Ontario, Toronto;
- Art Gallery of Windsor;
- Art Museums University of Toronto;
- Beaverbrook Art Gallery, Fredericton;
- Canada Council Art Bank;
- Canadian Centre for Architecture, Montreal;
- Dalhousie Art Gallery, Halifax;
- Glenbow Museum, Calgary;
- Kelowna Art Gallery;
- Kenderine Art Gallery;
- Leonard & Bina Ellen Art Gallery, Concordia University, Montreal;
- McMaster Museum of Art, Hamilton;
- McMichael Canadian Art Collection, Kleinberg;
- Montreal Museum of Fine Arts;
- Museum London;
- The Robert McLaughlin Gallery, Oshawa;
- University of Lethbridge Art Gallery;
- Winnipeg Art Gallery;
- Woodstock Art Gallery;

== Publications ==
- Mayor Gallery (1979). Tony Scherman. London: Mayor Gallery.
- Davidson (Maxwell) Gallery (New York) (1980). Tony Scherman. New York: Maxwell Davidson Gallery.
- Mayor Gallery (London) (1981). Tony Scherman: recent paintings [10 works.
- Crone, Rainer; Moos, David; Scherman, Tony (1992). The rape of Io: a cycle of paintings by Tony Scherman. Toronto: Sable-Castelli Gallery.
- Crone, Rainer; Scherman, Tony; Moos, David; Galerie Barbara Farber; Sable-Castelli Gallery (1992). The rape of Io. Amsterdam: B. Farber.
- Tony Scherman - "Callisto" ein Zyklus aus Ovids Metamorphosen; [anlässlich der Ausstellung Tony Scherman: Callisto - ein Zyklus aus Ovids Metamorphosen; Ausstellungsdauer: 27. Mai - 13. Juli 1993. Tony Scherman, Eve Förschl, Rainer Crone, undefinedKarl-Pfefferle-Galerie und Edition, München> Ausstellung Tony Scherman: Callisto - ein Zyklus aus Ovids Metamorphosen <1993 (eds.). München: Galerie Pfefferle. 1993. ISBN 978-3-925585-22-7.
- Scherman, Tony; Moos, David; Holubizky, Ihor; Heffel Gallery (1994). Portraits & gods. Vancouver: Heffel Gallery. ISBN 978-0-9694735-6-5.
- Portraits & Gods: Paintings by Tony Scherman. Heffel Gallery. 1994.
- Scherman, Tony; Holubizky, Ihor; Moos, David; Gallery Paule Anglim; Heffel Gallery; Galerie Barbara Farber; Art Gallery of Hamilton (Ont.) (1994). Portraits & gods: paintings. Hamilton, Ontario: Art Gallery of Hamilton.
- Scherman, Tony; Antaki, Karen; Galerie d'art Leonard et Bina Ellen (1996). Tony Scherman: Banquo's funeral = Tony Scherman : les funérailles de Banquo. Montréal: Leonard & Bina Ellen Art Gallery = Galerie d'art Leonard & Bina Ellen. ISBN 978-2-920394-42-1.
- Scherman, Tony; Henric, Jacques; Daniel Templon (Gallery) (1997). Tony Scherman: about 1789. Paris: Daniel Templon.
- Scherman, Tony; White, Scott; SOMA Gallery (1998). Tony Scherman: about 1789.
- Henric, Jacques; Galerie Daniel Templon (1998). Tony Scherman: about 1789. Paris: Daniel Templon.
- Scherman, Tony; Pevere, Geoff; Galerie Haas & Fuchs (1997). Tony Scherman: about 1789 : Gemälde : 1. November- 1. Dezember 1997, Galerie Haas & Fuchs. Berlin: Galerie Haas & Fuchs.
- Scherman, Tony; Ollman, Leah; SOMA Gallery (1998). About 1789. La Jolla, Calif: SOMA Gallery.
- Scherman, Tony; Henric, Jacques (1999). Tony Scherman, Napoléon dévisagé. Paris: Catleya. ISBN 978-2-913191-03-7.
- Scherman, Tony; Hollis, Jill (1999). Chasing Napoleon: Tony Sherman, forensic portraits. Moffat: Cameron & Hollis. ISBN 978-0-906506-15-8.
- Scherman, Tony (2000). Chasing Napoleon. Moffat: Cameron & Hollis. ISBN 978-0-906506-15-8.
- Simak, Ellen (2001). "Tony Scherman (1950- ): Il Mostro (Painting)". A Catalogue of the American Collection, Hunter Museum of Art, Chattanooga, Tennessee. 2.
- Scherman, Tony; Holubizky, Ihor; Kelowna Art Gallery (2004). Tony Scherman: pensées impensables. Kelowna, B.C.: Kelowna Art Gallery. ISBN 978-1-896749-23-5.
- Scherman, Tony; Wylie, Liz; Holubizky, Ihor; University of Toronto; Art Centre (2005). Tony Scherman: works on paper : a recent gift to the University of Toronto Art Collection. Toronto, Ont.: University of Toronto Art Centre. ISBN 978-0-7727-0653-9.
- Scherman, Tony; Winston Wächter Mayer Fine Art (Gallery) (2007). Tony Scherman: about 1865. Toronto, Ont.; New York, NY: Georgia Scherman Projects; Winston Wächter Fine Art. ISBN 978-0-9782810-0-7.
- Newlands, Anne (2007). Canadian paintings, prints and drawings. Buffalo; Richmond Hill, Ont.: Firefly Books. ISBN 978-1-55407-290-3.
- Scherman, Tony; Moos, David; Gallery at Windsor (Vero Beach, Fla.) (2011). Tony Scherman: new mythologies. Vero Beach, Fl.; Toronto: Windsor Press. ISBN 978-0-615-44970-8.

== Other sources ==
- Robert L. Picus, "Dreaming of Jocasta: Tony Scherman's `Seduction of Oedipus' is sophisticated, powerful", The San Diego Union-Tribune, June 12, 2003, Sec. Ent., p. 36.
