= Trench 11 =

- Theatrical release poster
- Directed by: Leo Scherman
- Written by: Matt Booi; Leo Scherman
- Story by: Michael Klug
- Produced by: Tyler Levine
- Starring: Rossif Sutherland; Robert Stadlober; Charlie Carrick; Shaun Benson; Ted Atherton; Luke Humphrey; Jeff Strome; Adam Hurtig; Karine Vanasse
- Cinematography: Dylan Macleod
- Edited by: Mike Munn
- Music by: Mark Domitric; Kevin Krouglow; Ryan McLarnon; Tom Westin
- Production companies: Carousel Pictures; Buffalo Gal Pictures
- Distributed by: Raven Banner Entertainment
- Release dates: October 15, 2017 (Toronto After Dark Film Festival); August 31, 2018 (Canada)
- Running time: 90 minutes
- Country: Canada
- Languages: English; German; French
- Budget: $1-2 million

Trench 11 is a 2017 Canadian horror thriller film directed by Leo Scherman. The movie stars Rossif Sutherland, Robert Stadlober, Charlie Carrick, Shaun Benson, Ted Atherton, Luke Humphrey, Jeff Strome, Adam Hurtig, and Karine Vanasse. The setting takes place near the end of the First World War where a group of Allied soldiers are sent to investigate a secret German bunker and discover the horrors that lay beneath it.

The film's development began in 2011 with its filming beginning in late 2016 in Winnipeg, Canada.

== Plot ==
Lieutenant Berton, a Canadian tunneller on the Western Front in France in 1918, digs 78 feet (24 m) beneath a German position to rescue fellow tunnellers, startling a survivor whose screams alert the Germans above. When the Germans detonate charges above him, Berton is trapped underground for twelve days.

On November 2, 1918, three months later, Major Jennings and Dr. Priest of the British Army Intelligence Corps brief Colonel Ashcroft about a deep underground German bunker called "Trench 11" hidden in the Argonne Forest, so-called because it is eleven miles behind the lines. The complex is commanded by a German officer named Reiner, called "The Prophet" by his men and a specialist in chemical and biological weapons. Jennings and Dr. Priest believe Trench 11 is still a base of operations for Reiner to construct bio-chemical weapons as the Germans failed to destroy it during their retreat. The Argonne lies within the American sector and Colonel Ashcroft arranges for U.S. troops to escort Jennings, Priest and Berton there so they can investigate. Berton, who has entered a romantic relationship with a French woman named Veronique, is forced to cut a leave short for the mission. Captain Cooper, Sergeant Pronger, and Private Kelly accompany the trio to Trench 11 and discover dead German soldiers in the trenches. Expended German bullet casings reveal the German Army killed their own men for unknown reasons.

At the headquarters of the German 5th Army, Reiner and Captain Mueller are ordered to erase all evidence of activities at Trench 11, called the "Wotan Complex" by the Germans. Reiner had failed to detonate the explosives inside during their retreat, which would have prevented the Allies from discovering the true nature of the complex. Mueller, disgusted by Reiner's work, is ordered to escort him to the bunker and ensure it is destroyed.

The Allied soldiers discover evidence of German infighting and sabotage, then find a sealed door underground. A German soldier who was left behind begs the group not to open the door, and becomes hysterical when they ignore him, forcing Cooper to shoot him. Moving deeper into the bunker the men are attacked by a crazed man who vomits on Kelly and arms Pronger's grenade. Berton tosses it away but collapses the tunnel behind them. Jennings orders Berton and Cooper to split and search for an exit while he, Dr. Priest, Pronger and Kelly investigate ahead.

When Berton and Cooper are ambushed by more crazed men, Cooper is stabbed as they fight them off and flee. The other group is attacked by a crazed man in a hospital room. Pronger kills the man, after which a worm crawls out of the gunshot wound. Dr. Priest dissects the body, finding it full of parasitic worms that are responsible for his insane, violent behavior, and concludes the unnatural worms have been engineered. Pronger and Kelly demand to leave the bunker and a standoff ensues with Jennings before the group is ambushed by non-infected German soldiers who kill Pronger and Jennings and capture Kelly and Dr. Priest. Berton and Cooper discover an exit but are also taken prisoner. Mueller has lost his own tunneller to the infected Germans and is unable to reactivate the demolition charges. He attempts to recruit the Allied prisoners to assist, but Dr. Priest refuses to cooperate. Kelly's health deteriorates and Reiner interrogates Dr. Priest. They discuss how the worms were meant to kill livestock in Allied countries but jumped species to infect humans. Reiner was delighted by the result and deliberately bred deadlier strains.

Mueller escorts Berton, Cooper and Kelly to the main demolition charge on the bottom level of the bunker, but Kelly succumbs to the parasite's control and kills Cooper before being shot dead by Berton. Mueller is held at gunpoint and released after convincing Berton that the parasite will spread rapidly if able to escape from the bunker. Dr. Priest begs Reiner to spare civilian lives from the parasite, but Reiner remains adamant about using the parasite to destroy Europe and rebuild it under German rule. He then tortures Dr. Priest.

Mueller and Berton discover that Reiner never rigged the explosives in the first place. Reiner meanwhile, having finished torturing Dr. Priest to death, orders the lower levels sealed and flooded with poison gas and begins collecting his parasites. Mueller and Berton escape and try to rig the explosives to a clock timer for a remote detonation but an infected soldier attacks them, breaking Mueller's leg and destroying the clock. Unable to move, Mueller agrees to stay behind to manually detonate the explosives, giving Berton time to arm the remaining explosives on the bunker’s upper levels. Upon reaching the ladder leading up to the surface, as he attempts to climb up and escape, Berton is shot in the leg by Reiner and his guard, Private Johann. Reiner mocks and tortures Berton, who endures it to distract Reiner and Johann long enough for Mueller to detonate the explosives. The explosions cause the bunker to quickly start collapsing and knock the two Germans off balance, allowing Berton to kill Johann and tackle Reiner. In the melee with Berton, Reiner runs for the ladder and trips, resulting in a parasite vial in his hand piercing his left eye. The tunnel collapses on Reiner while Berton narrowly escapes to the surface and limps away from the area, seeing a vision of Veronique.

== Cast ==
- Rossif Sutherland as Lt(Lieutenant). Berton
- Robert Stadlober as Reiner
- Charlie Carrick as Dr. Priest
- Shaun Benson as Kapitan Müller
- Ted Atherton as Maj(Major). Jennings
- Luke Humphrey as Capt(Captain). Cooper
- Jeff Strome as Sgt(Sergeant). Pronger
- Adam Hurtig as Pvt(Private). Kelly
- Karine Vanasse as Veronique
- John B. Lowe as Col(Colonel). Ashcroft
- Werner Artinger as Gen(General). Ophulus
- Andrew Cecon as Pvt(Private). Wilcox

== Production ==
Development of the film begin in 2011 by producer Tyler Levine and his production company Carousel Pictures. Tyler partnered with Buffalo Gal Pictures to recruit various well known Canadian film crew. The crew includes Chad Giesbrecht (production designer), Dylan Macleod (cinematographer), Francois Dagenais (special makeup effects artist), Mike Munn (film editor), Martin Katz (executive producer), Walter Gasparovic (executive producer), Phyllis Laing (executive producer), and Isaac Clements (co-producer).

Telefilm Canada, The Harold Greenburg Fund, Manitoba Film and Music and the Cogeco Fund helped financed the film's development and production.

Production of the film began in late 2016 and was shot in Winnipeg, Canada. The director of the film, Leo Scherman, described that the biggest challenge in making the film was due to a limited budget for making Canadian films compared to films produced elsewhere (i.e. the United States). Leo stated that he was fortunate and thankful for the generous amount of financial support the film had behind it.

== Release ==
Trench 11 premiered in Canada during the Toronto After Dark Film Festival on October 15, 2017. It was later released in Mexico on October 27, 2017, during Mórbido Fest and the UK on April 21, 2018, during the Dead by Dawn Horror Film Festival. It was released in Canada for a second time (albeit limited) on August 31, 2018. On September 11, 2018, the film was released in the US through the internet.

== Reception ==
=== Critical response ===
On Rotten Tomatoes, the film holds an approval rating of 92%, based on 12 reviews, with an average rating of 6.33/10. Mike Hassler of Destroy the Brain! gave the film a score of 3.5/5, praising the film's atmosphere and Rossif Sutherland's performance but criticizing the film's lack of development for other characters and drab setting.

=== Awards ===
Trench 11 won several awards from Toronto After Dark Film Festival in 2017. In 2018, the Canadian Society of Cinematographers nominated the film for CSC Award for Theatrical Feature Cinematography.

List of Awards and Nominations
Year	Award	Category	Recipients	Result
2017	Toronto After Dark Film Festival (Audience choice awards)	Best Feature Film Gold		Won
2017	Toronto After Dark Film Festival (Specialty awards)	Best horror film		Won
2017	Toronto After Dark Film Festival (Specialty awards)	Best Canadian Feature Film		Won
2017	Toronto After Dark Film Festival (Specialty awards)	Scariest Film		Won
2018	Canadian Society of Cinematographers Awards	CSC Award for Theatrical Feature Cinematography	Dylan Macleod	Nominated
