= Margaret Priest =

Canadian artist and educator (born 1944)

Margaret Priest RCA
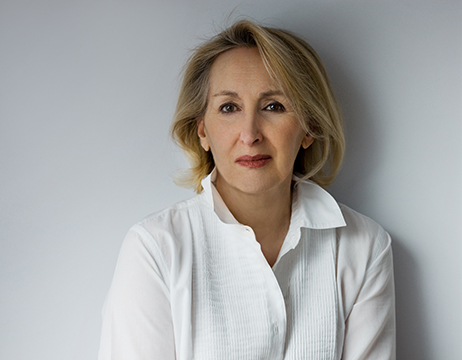
- Portrait of Priest by Joy von Tiedemann
- Born: 1944 (age 81–82); England
- Education: Royal College of Art
- Known for: Graphic artist, painter, printmaker, sculptor who does public art projects
- Notable work: The Monument to Construction Workers
- Spouse: Tony Scherman
- Children: 3, including Leo Scherman
- Awards: Honorary doctorate (OCAD)
- Website: margaretpriest.com

Margaret Priest RCA (born 1944) is a Toronto based artist, educator and arts advocate. Priest's artistic practice of 50 years includes painting, print-making, sculpture and public art projects, and she is known and recognized for drawing the interiors and exteriors of the modern, urban built environment. Her work has been exhibited across Canada and internationally in solo and group exhibitions since 1970. Priest is a Professor Emeritus at the University of Guelph, where she taught in the School of Fine Art and Music from 1983 to 2001, and has guest lectured extensively in Canada, England and the United States.

Priest has been living and working in Toronto since 1976, after relocating from England with her husband, the Canadian-born painter Tony Scherman. They have three children, Leo, Georgia and Claudia.

== Biography ==
Priest was born at Tyringham Hall, England, then a war-time maternity hospital for people evacuated from the bombing of London in World War II. She grew up in the family council house in Becontree, Dagenham. Her father Arthur was a railway employee; her mother Gertrude Tommason was the daughter of a stonemason. Priest studied at the South West Essex Technical College and School of Art in 1963 and 1964 before entering Maidstone College of Art. From 1967 she attended the Royal College of Art in London and graduated with a master's degree in 1970. In the same year, her photolithograph Picture Palace III, 1969, was included in Studio International magazine's Prints and Lithographs supplement. Priest’s first solo exhibition was at the Arnolfini in Bristol in 1970, which hosted a second show in 1974. Priest was a lecturer at Saint Martin's School of Art in London from 1972 to 1976, when she moved to Canada. Priest was Professor in the School of Fine Art and Music at the University of Guelph from 1983 to 2001, and is now professor emeritus. In 1996, the Art Gallery of Hamilton and the Macdonald Stewart Art Centre co-organized a two-site career survey exhibition including drawing, painting, printwork and sculpture. In October 2019, the Art Gallery of Ontario mounted an exhibition of her work focused around the recently acquired suite of prints for The Monument to Construction Workers.

== Work ==
Priest’s work is not overtly feminist or political, but issues of gender and social class have had a critical role in her approach and thinking. In an interview with Rozsika Parker she articulated her awareness of the still male-dominated art world as a student in the 1960s and into the 1970s, and also remained conscious of her working-class background. Griselda Pollock has noted Priest's choice of drawing as a medium as a conscious decision to embrace a typically feminine art form on her own terms.

=== Architecture as source and subject matter ===
Modern and aspirational architecture of the international style has been a primary interest for Priest as well as the democratic aspect of public housing in the British reconstruction phase after World War II. She has been included in exhibitions with an architectural focus, such as Viewpoints (1989) and Toronto/Roma (1991). Architect Marc Baraness has noted that Priest's depictions of architecture by Richard Neutra, Adolf Loos and Eileen Gray distills the architects' original ideas and the emotional content of their work. Critic and art historian Bernard Denvir has observed that Priest's drawings of architecture are resonant with the human aspects of the built environment.

=== Drawing ===
Priest often uses research-selected photographs as a source and starting point for her architectural drawings, through which alterations and refinements are made. British writer Deanna Petherbridge and critic E.C. Woodley have described the long creative process of the artist, building on painstakingly observed photographs combined with her own memories, and making interventions into the architectural space through the eventual drawing.

=== Sculpture ===
Priest’s earliest sculptural work is related to her Toronto public art commission, The Monument to Construction Workers, which was completed in 1993. The Construction Series: Building Materials (1990-1995) were a hybrid of precise drawings and actual building materials such as granite, aluminum and limestone, which were used to frame the drawings. Art historian Linda Norden observed the tactile aspects of these works, which she saw as reflecting the importance of materiality and place. Between 1996 and 2000, Priest created three fully dimensional sculptures each titled The Critic’s Armchair. They are meant to resemble furniture and made with materials that are also associated with modern architecture and design, such as chrome, steel, terrazzo and marble. Each armchair includes an insert in which a material drawing is positioned. One writer remarked on the absence of the implied human figure as being central to the effect of these works. Priest’s sculptural work in 2011 returned to recollections of her life in England. The centre piece incorporates a well-crafted shipping crate that serves as a plinth for a variety of objects made from cherry wood. One of these is a doll-house like model of Tyringham Hall. Another is a locomotive, a homage to the site of her father’s war injury. Each object has a steel engraved label with poetic phrases on both sides. For Tyringham Hall, one side is engraved with “where I didn’t belong but I came from”; the other side with “On Chance and Charity.”

=== Public Art ===
Priest’s on-going interest in architecture has led her to conceptualize and devise integrated permanent public art projects. The first to be built was The Monument to Construction Workers in downtown Toronto, a landmark component for the collaborative urban park project Cloud Gardens working with project architects Baird Sampson. Completed in 1993, it received a Governor General’s Award of Merit in Architecture in 1994.

The Monument measures approximately 22 metres wide by 10 metres at its highest point, and consists of a structural steel grid with twenty-six 150 x 150 cm inserted panels. The panels began as Priest’s geometric composition drawings of materials and methods used in each of the professional construction trades, such as carpentry, concrete work, and pipe-fitting. The panels themselves were fabricated by the respective tradespeople. Linda Norden described the unique conditions and approach of the process of creating this work, in which Priest directed the activity of around 40 trade workers, all male, subverting the usual gender dynamic of construction. Urban historian Robert Fulford has noted the way in which construction workers are celebrated in the work, while other critics have observed the way that the work reverses the usual materials and processes of building.

Priest continued the sculptural work of the Monument with a suite of 27 etchings produced in 1994: The 27th etching is a facsimile of the dedication panel. Curator Renée van der Avoird has said of the etchings that they reflect the strength and precision of both the represented trades and the artist herself.

Her most recent major public work was for the Infinity Condominium Development, Toronto, in collaboration with artist Fraser Stables. Commissioned through the City of Toronto Percent for Public Art Program, it was completed in 2008. Using terrazzo and lighting elements, Priest and Stables traced travel across the site from pre-contact to the railway tracks of the 19th and 20th century.

== Cultural advocacy and honours ==
Priest received an Ontario Confederation of University Faculty Associations Teaching Award in 1996, and was recognized for her role in developing the University’s MFA program. Priest has been a visiting critic and lecturer at the University of Toronto, Carleton University, and the University of Waterloo, and has been a visiting critic at the Yale School of Architecture and the Graduate School of Design at Harvard University. In 2015 she received an honorary doctorate from the Ontario College of Art and Design University, Toronto. Priest also served for a number of years as a Trustee for the Gershon Iskowitz Foundation.

== Collections ==
Priest’s work in all media are held in public collections in Canada, England and the United States, including:

=== International ===
- Arts Council England
- British Council
- Tate, London
- Smith College Museum of Art, USA

=== Canada ===
- Agnes Etherington Art Centre
- Art Gallery of Ontario
- Art Museum at the University of Toronto
- Canadian Centre for Architecture
- Kelowna Art Gallery
- McMaster Museum of Art
