= Mark Humphrey (actor) =

Canadian actor

- Born: Mark Adrian Humphrey; December 27, 1960 (age 65); Vancouver, British Columbia, Canada
- Occupation: Actor
- Years active: 1985–present
- Website: http://www.markhumphrey.com/

Mark Adrian Humphrey (born December 27, 1960) is a Canadian actor best known for the role of Jake Antonelli in the Canadian television series E.N.G. In 1988 he made his feature film debut in the film Iron Eagle II as Captain Matt Cooper, Doug Masters' (Jason Gedrick) best friend. Humphrey has been featured in other films and several television movies. In 2005 he starred in Living With the Enemy with Sarah Lancaster. In 2006 he starred in The Wives He Forgot with Molly Ringwald as a handsome amnesiac. In 2007 he appeared in Still Small Voices with Catherine Bell. Humphrey has also appeared in numerous television series.

== Life and career ==
Humphrey was born in Vancouver, British Columbia, to Sidney and Jack Humphrey. His family relocated to Toronto, Ontario in 1967, where his father worked as a producer for CBC Radio and Television. After graduating from high school, Humphrey moved to New York City to study acting at the Lee Strasberg Theatre and Film Institute. Humphrey spent five years in New York, later returning to Toronto, and eventually relocating to California.

Humphrey has four siblings. His three brothers, John, Paul, and Andy, are professional musicians. His sister, Lesley, is a former Ford model.

In 2009 Humphrey appeared in the Canadian dramatic series Paradise Falls, and the television movies Encounter with Danger with Shannen Doherty, and Hostile Makeover with Maggie Lawson. He appeared in the 2010 feature film Summer Eleven. In 2015 Humphrey joined the cast of the Hallmark Channel series When Calls the Heart as mysterious preacher Frank Hogan.

Humphrey appeared in the 2005 independent film Cruel But Necessary with his ex-wife Wendel Meldrum and their son Luke Humphrey.
