= Wendel Meldrum =

Canadian actress (1954–2021)

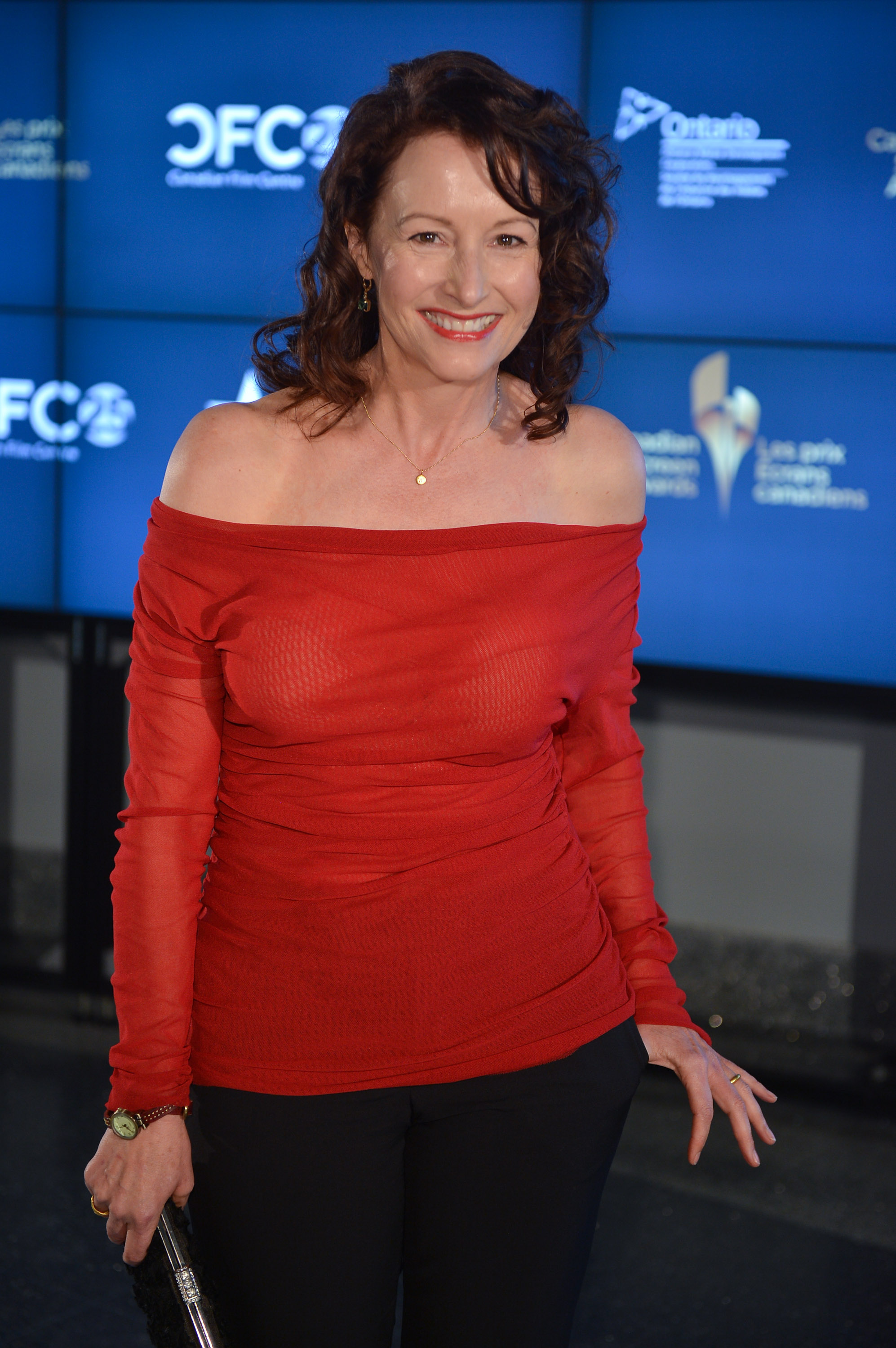
- Meldrum in 2013
- Born: Wendy Anne Meldrum; July 21, 1954; Edmonton, Alberta, Canada
- Died: January 27, 2021 (aged 66)
- Occupation: Actress
- Years active: 1984–2021
- Spouses: Mark Humphrey (divorced): Patric Caird

Wendy Anne "Wendel" Meldrum (July 21, 1954 – January 27, 2021) was a Canadian actress best known for her roles as the "low talker" in the 1993 Seinfeld episode "The Puffy Shirt", and as Miss White/Mrs. Heimer on The Wonder Years.

She guest starred in several television series and appeared in a number of feature films and television movies. Her films include Beautiful Dreamers (1990), Why Me? (1990), Diplomatic Immunity (1991) and The Divine Ryans (1999). She wrote the screenplay for the 2005 independent film Cruel But Necessary. She also played the starring role of Betty Munson alongside her real life ex-husband Mark Humphrey and their son Luke Humphrey.

Meldrum received multiple nominations and awards for her performance as Anne Blecher in the Canadian television comedy-drama series Less Than Kind, which finished its four-season run on HBO Canada in 2013.

On November 19, 2014, Meldrum appeared on Ken Reid's TV Guidance Counselor podcast. She died after a short illness on January 27, 2021.

== Filmography ==
=== Film ===
Year	Title	Role	Notes
1984	Vamping	Rita	
1990	Why Me?	Gatou Vardebedian	
1990	Beautiful Dreamers	Jessie Bucke	
1991	Diplomatic Immunity	Kim Dades	
1999	Blast from the Past	Ruth	
1999	The Divine Ryans	Linda Ryan	
2003	A Mighty Wind	Witch #1	
2005	Cruel but Necessary	Betty Munson	
2005	Partner(s)	Sandy	
2010	Queen of the Lot	Kylie	

=== Television ===
Year	Title	Role	Notes
1984–85	Knots Landing	P.K. Kelly	8 episodes
1985	Punky Brewster	Heather	"Play It Again, Punky"
1985	American Playhouse	Shelby Dischinger Everson	"Breakfast with Les and Bess"
1985	Stark	Laura Stark	TV film
1986	Cagney & Lacey	Susan	"Post Partum"
1986	Dallas: The Early Years	Honey	TV film
1987	Family Ties	Kathy Brady	"O'Brother: Parts 1 & 2"
1987	I Married Dora	Janet Farrell	"I Married Dora"
1987–88	Pursuit of Happiness	Margaret Callahan	Main role
1988–91	The Wonder Years	Miss White / Mrs. Heimer	Recurring role
1989	Day by Day	Carol Gilbert	"Father Knows Best"
1990	E.N.G.	Jaz Taylor	"The Dancer and the Dance"
1992	Northern Exposure	Amy Lochner	"Nothing's Perfect"
1992	City Boy	Olivia Pollard	TV film
1993	Picket Fences	Wendy Hill	"Sightings"
1993; 1998	Seinfeld	Leslie / Low-Talker	"The Puffy Shirt" and "The Finale"
1994	Hush Little Baby	Susan Nolan	TV film
1994	Due South	Leann Brighton	"Pilot"
1994	Sodbusters	Lilac Gentry	TV film
1994–95	Side Effects	Elisabeth Mercer	"Worth It", "Heart Choices", "The Great Lutz"
1995	The Marshal	Veronica Cole	"Hitwoman"
1995	Pig Sty	Dr. James	"The Ghost and Mr. Evans"
1995	The Song Spinner	Mona	TV film
1995	The Commish	Emily Daniels	"Father Image: Parts 1 & 2"
1996	The Pretender	Dr. Lizabeth Drake	"Not Even a Mouse"
1997	Promised Land	Ellen	"The Getaway"
1997	Dad's Week Off	Lew	TV film
1997	Melanie Darrow	Diane	TV film
1998	Murder at 75 Birch	Pat Todson	TV film
1999	The Outer Limits	Renee Stuyvescent	"Donor"
2000	First Wave	Ann Berman	"Wednesday's Child"
2001	Strong Medicine	Eleanor Vogel	"Complications"
2001	NYPD Blue	Lucy Gullickson	"Baby Love"
2003	Bliss	Dr. Andrea Gibson	"Cat Got Your Tongue"
2008–2012	Less Than Kind	Anne Blecher	Main role
2012	The Phantoms	Linda Jordan	TV film
2014	Saving Hope	Mimi	"Twinned Lambs"
2014	Working the Engels	Little Wanda	"Jenna vs. Big Pastry Part II"

== Awards and nominations ==
Year	Association	Category	Nominated work	Result	Ref.
2007	Winnipeg International Film Festival	Outstanding Actress in a Female Role	Cruel but Necessary	Won	
2009	Canadian Comedy Awards	Best Performance by a Female - Television	Less Than Kind	Won	
2009	Canadian Comedy Awards	Best Performance by an Ensemble - Television	Less Than Kind	Won	
2010	Canadian Comedy Awards	Best Performance by a Female - Television	Less Than Kind	Nominated	
2010	Canadian Comedy Awards	Best Performance by an Ensemble - Television	Less Than Kind	Nominated	
