= Luke Humphrey =

American-Canadian actor

- Born: June 12, 1987 (age 39); California, U.S.
- Occupation: Actor
- Years active: 2005–present
- Known for: I Was Lorena Bobbitt
- Parents: Mark Humphrey; Wendel Meldrum

Luke Humphrey (born June 12, 1987) is an American-born Canadian actor. He is most noted for his performance as John Wayne Bobbitt in the television film I Was Lorena Bobbitt, for which he won the Canadian Screen Award for Best Actor in a Television Film or Miniseries at the 10th Canadian Screen Awards in 2022.

== Early life ==
The son of Canadian actors Mark Humphrey and Wendel Meldrum, he was born in California while his parents were working in Hollywood.

== Career ==
Humphrey had his first film acting role in the 2005 film Cruel but Necessary, alongside both of his parents even though they were already divorced. His other roles have included the films I Don't Want to Kill Myself (2011) and Trench 11 (2017), the television series Frankie Drake Mysteries and Tiny Pretty Things, and the web series Chateau Laurier, as well as stage roles in Stratford Festival productions of The Three Musketeers and Shakespeare in Love.

== Filmography ==
=== Film ===
| Year | Title | Role | Notes |
|---|---|---|---|
| 2005 | Cruel but Necessary | Darwin Munson | |
| 2011 | I Don't Want to Kill Myself | James | |
| 2017 | Trench 11 | Captain Cooper | |
| 2023 | Priscilla | Terry West | |

=== Television ===
| Year | Title | Role | Notes |
|---|---|---|---|
| 2015 | Saving Hope | Kurt Belford | Episode: "Waiting on a Friend" |
| 2016 | Murdoch Mysteries | Julian Philips | Episode: "The Big Chill" |
| 2016 | Motive | Justin | Episode: "Chronology of Pain" |
| 2017 | Slasher | R.G. | Episode: "Night of Hunters" |
| 2017 | Star Trek: Discovery | V'Latak | Episode: "Lethe" |
| 2017, 2019 | Frankie Drake Mysteries | Joe Perry | 2 episodes |
| 2018 | Taken | Neal | Episode: "OPSEC" |
| 2018–2021 | Chateau Laurier | Vivian Mutchmur | 7 episodes |
| 2019 | Save Me | Tom | Episode: "Animl" |
| 2019 | Hudson & Rex | Chad Firestone | Episode: "Under the Influencer" |
| 2020 | I Was Lorena Bobbitt | John Bobbitt | Television film |
| 2020 | Tiny Pretty Things | Travis Quinn | 4 episodes |
| 2021 | See | Kerrigan | 3 episodes |
| 2022 | Love and the Radio Star | Patrick Ryan | Television film |
| 2023 | Yes, Chef! Christmas | Logan Forest | Lifetime Television film |
| 2024 | Alert: Missing Persons Unit | Ezekiel 'Zeke' Lapp | Season 2 Episode 6 Jedidiah & Lucy |
