= Leo Scherman =

Canadian film director

- Screamfest (2017)
- Born: Leo Edmund Scherman; April 2, 1975 (age 51); London, United Kingdom
- Education: McGill University
- Occupations: Film director, screenwriter, producer, actor

Leo Edmund Scherman (born April 2, 1975) is a Canadian film and television director, writer and producer. He is best known as the co-writer and director of the feature film Trench 11, and co-creator of the television series Cock'd Gunns.

== Personal life ==
Scherman was born in London, England to Canadian artist Tony Scherman and British artist Margaret Priest. His grandfather is Canadian conductor and violinist Paul Scherman and his father-in-law is deep-sea explorer Dr. Joe MacInnis.

In 1997, he graduated from McGill University in Montreal, Quebec, Canada with a degree in Cultural Studies.

== Selected filmography ==
=== Film ===
Year	Film	Credited as		
Year	Film	Director	Producer	Writer
2004	White Knuckles	Yes	Yes	Yes
2006	Living Death			Yes
2008	Never Forget	Yes		
2017	Trench 11	Yes		Yes

== Awards and nominations ==
He won two Gemini Awards at the 23rd Gemini Awards in 2008 for Cock'd Gunns, for Best Writing in a Comedy Series and Best Ensemble Performance in a Comedy Series.

Trench 11 won the award for Best Feature Film at the Toronto After Dark Film Festival in 2017.
