= Bay Adelaide Centre =

Office complex in the Financial District of Toronto, Ontario, Canada

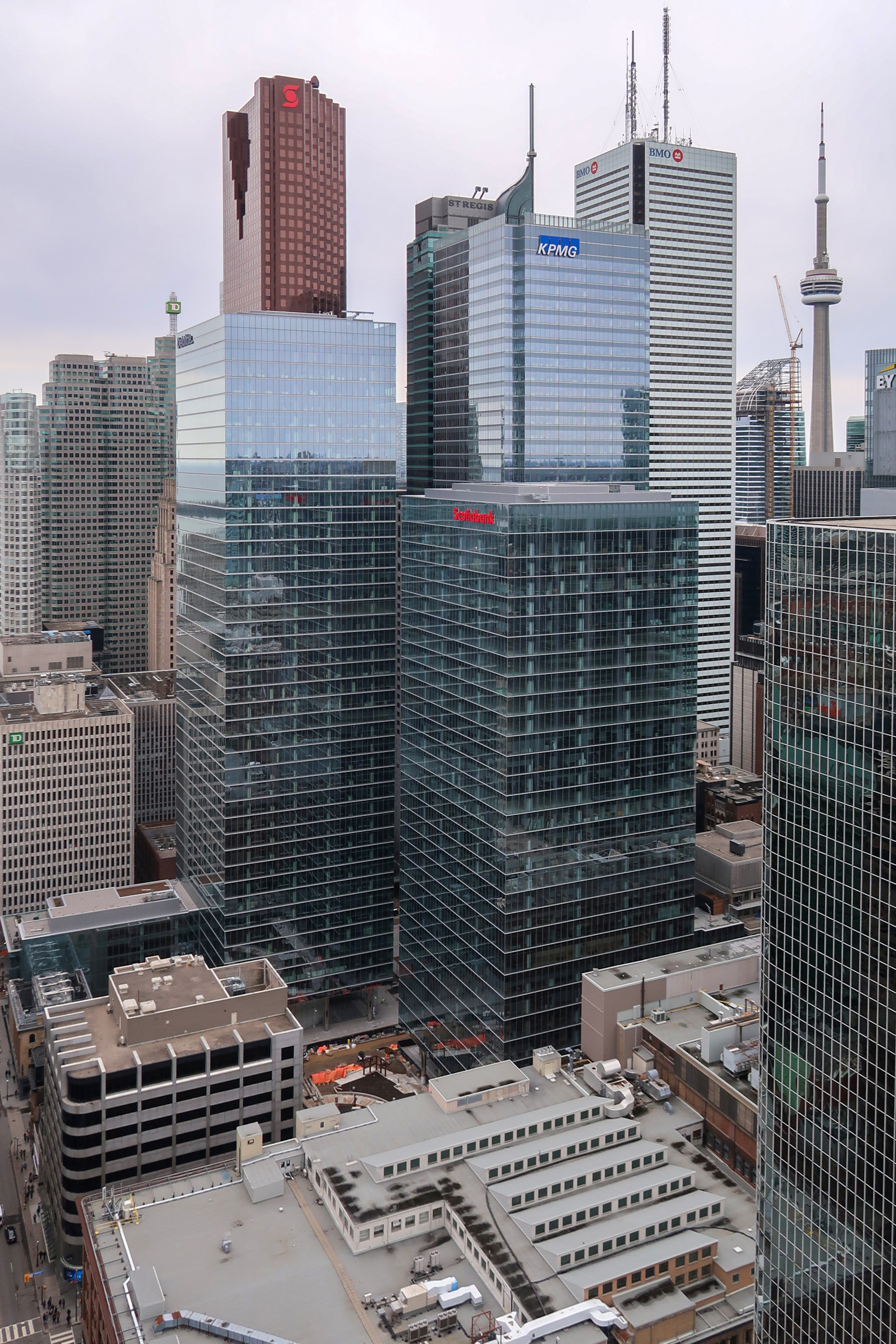
- Bay Adelaide Centre in 2023

- Location within Ontario

General information
- Status: Completed
- Type: Office building
- Architectural style: Neomodern
- Location: 333 Bay Street; Toronto, Ontario, Canada
- Coordinates: 43.6504°N 79.3800°W
- Construction started: 2007
- Completed: 2022
- Owner: Brookfield Properties
- Operator: Brookfield Properties

Height
- Roof: 218 m (715 ft) (Bay Adelaide West); 196 m (643 ft) (Bay Adelaide East)

Technical details
- Floor area: 108,000 m^{2} (1,160,000 sq ft) (Bay Adelaide West); 91,045 m^{2} (980,000 sq ft) (Bay Adelaide East)
- Lifts/elevators: 34

Design and construction
- Architects: West Tower: WZMH Architects; East Tower and North Tower: KPMB Architects, Adamson Associates (as architect of record)
- Developer: Brookfield Properties
- Structural engineer: Halcrow Yolles
- Main contractor: West Tower: EllisDon; East Tower: Multiplex

The Bay Adelaide Centre is an office complex in the Financial District of Toronto, Ontario, Canada. The first phase, a 51-storey skyscraper known as Bay Adelaide West, was completed in July 2009. The second phase, the 44-storey Bay Adelaide East, was completed in October 2016. A third tower, Scotiabank North Tower, opened in 2022 and serves as the new global head office of Canadian bank Scotiabank.

== Description ==
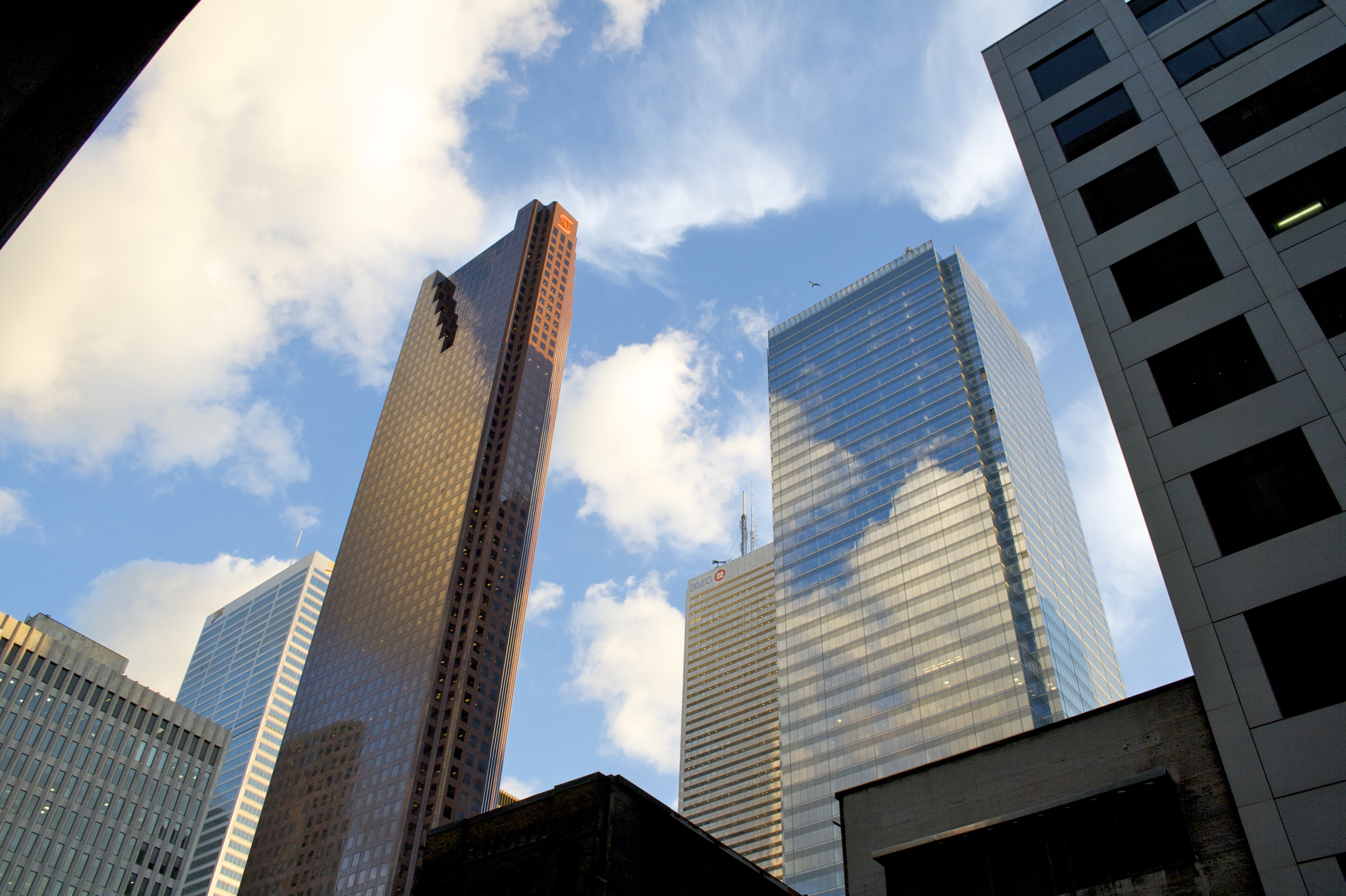
Bay Adelaide West in Toronto's Financial District in 2009, prior to the construction of Bay Adelaide East

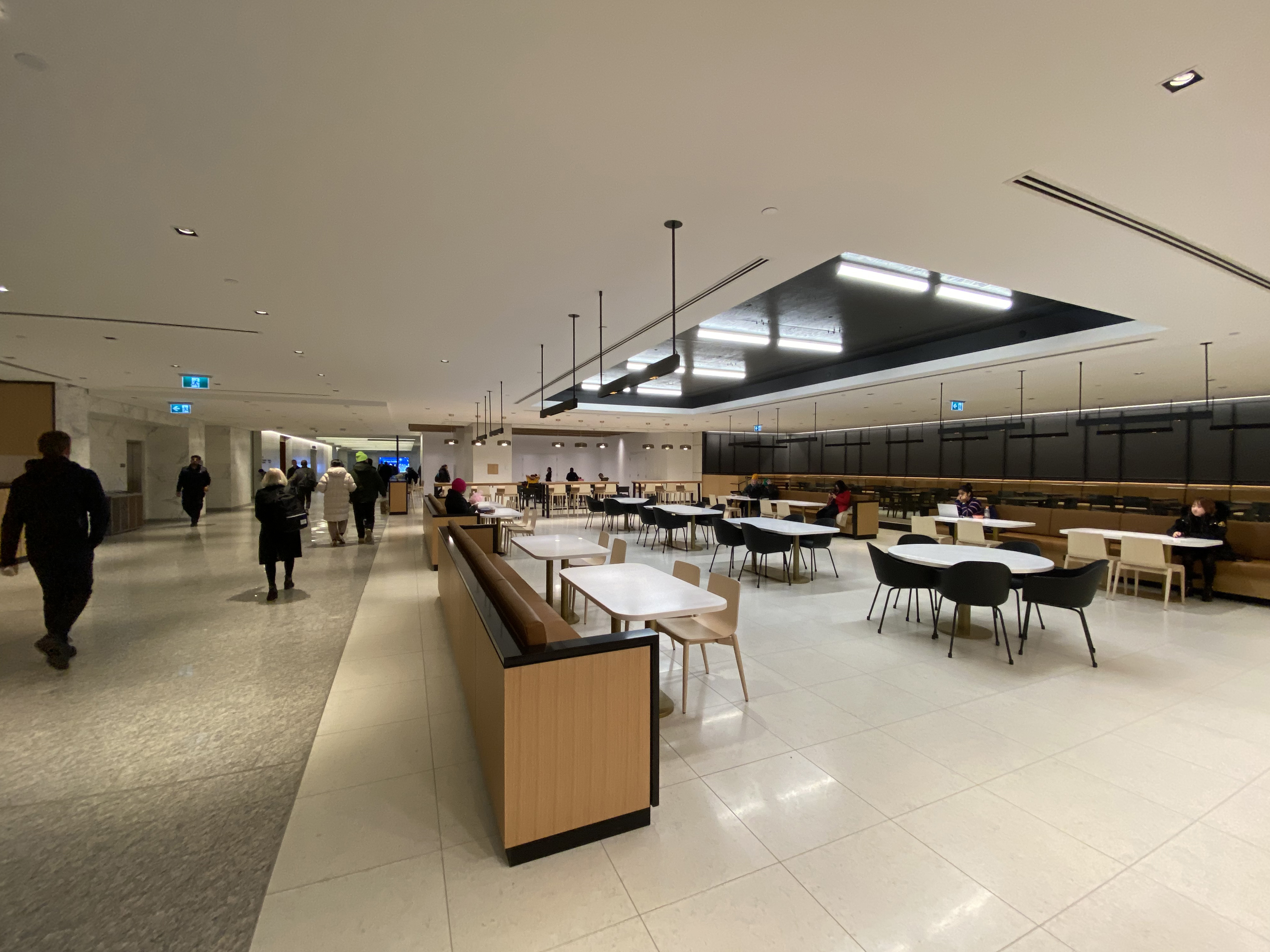
Bay Adelaide Centre Food Court in basement, opened in late 2022

The Bay Adelaide Centre complex currently consists of three towers. The first tower, Bay Adelaide West, was completed in 2009 entailing a floor area of 108,000 square metres (1,160,000 sq ft) and a height of 218 metres (715 ft) or 51 storeys. It is located on the northeast corner of Bay Street and Adelaide Street West.

The second tower, Bay Adelaide East, entails a floor area of 91,045 square metres (980,000 sq ft) and a height of 44 storeys. Located mid-block between Adelaide Street West and Temperance Street, the tower has a 6-storey podium extending to the northwest corner of Yonge Street and Adelaide Street West.

The third tower, Bay Adelaide North entails a floor area of approximately 46,450 square metres (500,000 sq ft) and a height of 28 to 32 storeys. Unlike the two other towers in the complex, the north tower is located on the north side of Temperance Street, with frontage along Richmond Street West.

The towers of the Bay Adelaide Centre are connected by an underground concourse, which extends under Temperance Street, and is connected to the PATH network. The underground concourse has PATH connections to Scotia Plaza to the south and Hudson's Bay Queen Street to the north. There is also a four-level underground garage under the complex, with vehicular access from both Adelaide Street West and Richmond Street West.

There is a 0.2-hectare (0.49-acre) public space, Arnell Plaza, located between Bay Adelaide West and Bay Adelaide East. Although Arnell Plaza is privately owned, public access has been legally secured by the City of Toronto. Cloud Gardens, a 0.24-hectare (0.59-acre) public park, is located immediately to the east of the Bay Adelaide North site on land conveyed to the City of Toronto as a condition of the original development approvals for the complex.

The complex's mechanical facilities are located in a four-storey above-grade building on the southwest corner of Yonge and Temperance Streets, with retail uses to be constructed at grade as part of the Bay Adelaide East construction. In order to accommodate the construction of the Bay Adelaide East podium, the historic facades of the former Elgin Block, constructed in 1850 and 1910 and once occupied by Holt Renfrew, were disassembled, refurbished and reconstructed as the facade of the mechanical facility building.

Both Bay Adelaide West and Bay Adelaide East are designed in a modernist style, although the historic north and west facades of the former National Building at the corner of Bay and Temperance Streets, completed in 1926, has been incorporated into Bay Adelaide West.

== History ==
=== First tower proposal ===
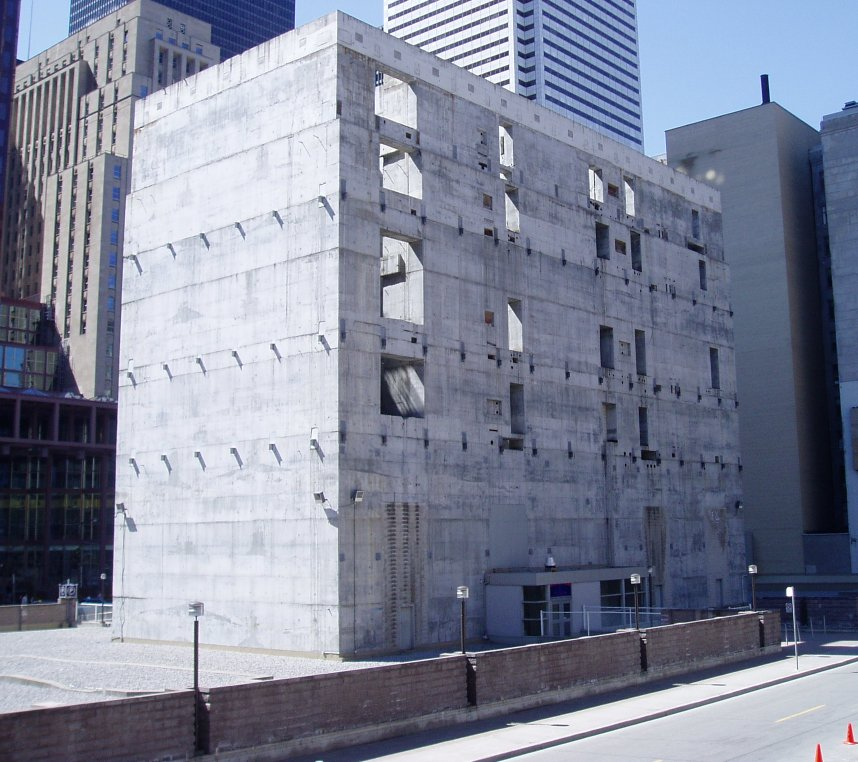
The six-storey "stump" in 2005, which stood as a symbol of the 1990s recession until its demolition in 2006.

The first tower development on the site was a joint project by Markborough Properties and TrizecHahn: a 57-storey office tower to be constructed at the corner of Bay and Adelaide Streets. It was to have cost $500 million, and was the last of a series of construction projects in downtown Toronto launched in the boom years of the 1980s, when a number of massive towers were built nearby, such as Scotia Plaza.

The building caused considerable controversy among those opposed to the erection of such massive structures. The tower would have stood far higher than was allowed by the city's official plan. To gain city hall's approval, the developers committed some $33 million towards new social housing. In addition, a portion of the site and $5 million were given by the developers to the city to build a new park named Bay Adelaide Park (now Cloud Gardens). Both of these deals went ahead, despite the tower never having been completed.

Construction began in 1990, but the developers soon ran into problems. The economy went into recession and office vacancy rates in Toronto rose to 20%. Construction was halted, and in 1993, with over $500 million already invested, the project was permanently put on hold. All that was completed was the underground parking garage and several storeys of the concrete service shaft that stood from 1991 onwards, as a monument to the failed project in downtown Toronto. The stump of the service shaft was known to security and the locals as "the bunker" or simply "the stump". The parking garage was in operation, and the stump itself was used as a surface on which to mount advertisements.

The exterior of the stump of the building was depicted as a nightclub in the opening scene of the 1996 comedy film Kids in the Hall: Brain Candy.

=== Subsequent proposals ===
There were several attempts to revive the project. In 1998 TrizecHahn briefly revived it, but another shift in the economy caused them to again pause. In 2000 there was again talk of reviving the project, but the next year TrizecHahn sold its 50% share to Brookfield Properties for $49 million. Brookfield was committed to completing the structure to a smaller height of either 40 or 50 storeys, but later that year the economy again soured and the project remained on hiatus.

=== Current development scheme ===
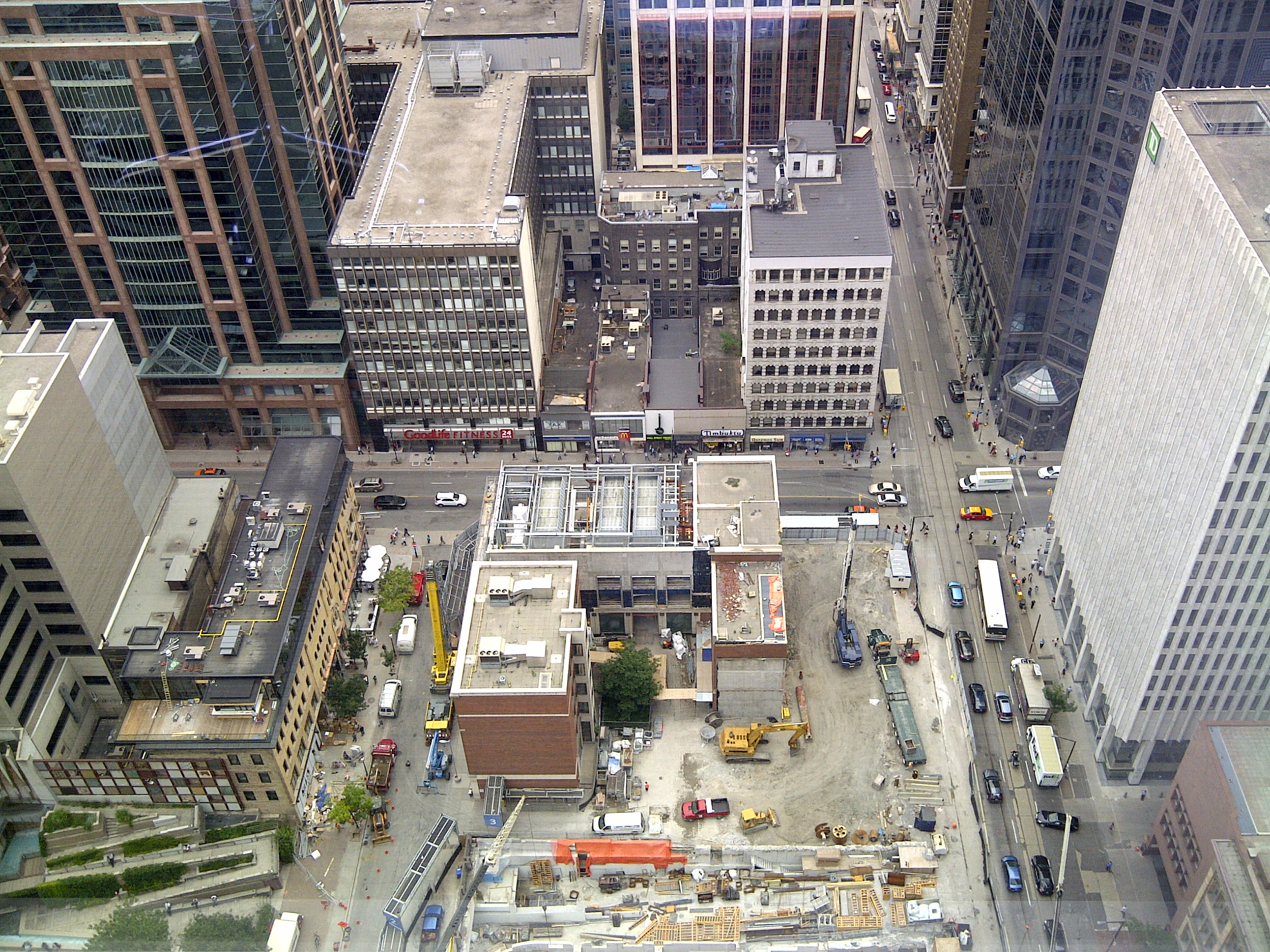
Excavation for Bay Adelaide East in July 2013

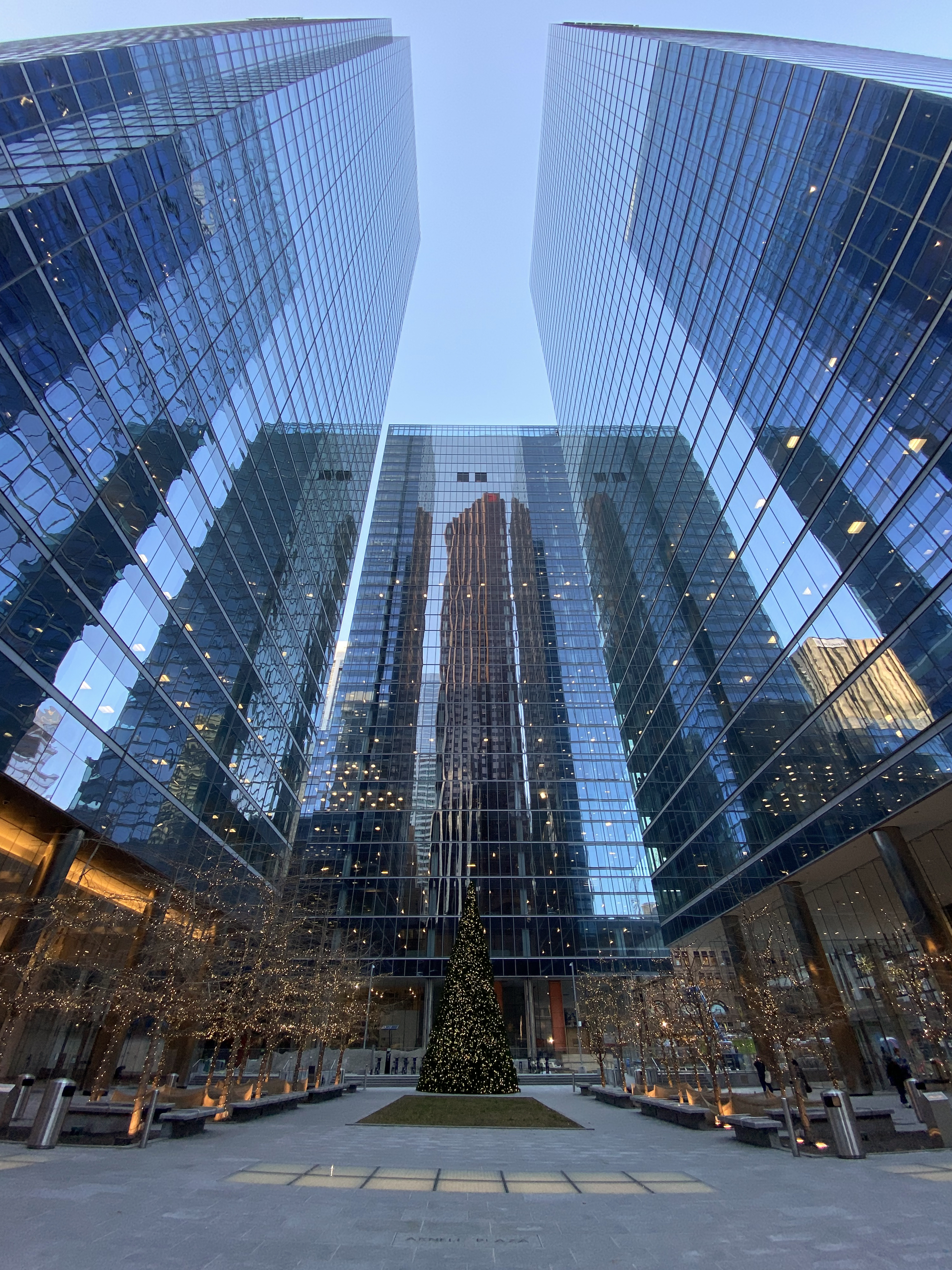
Bay Adelaide Centre in December 2021

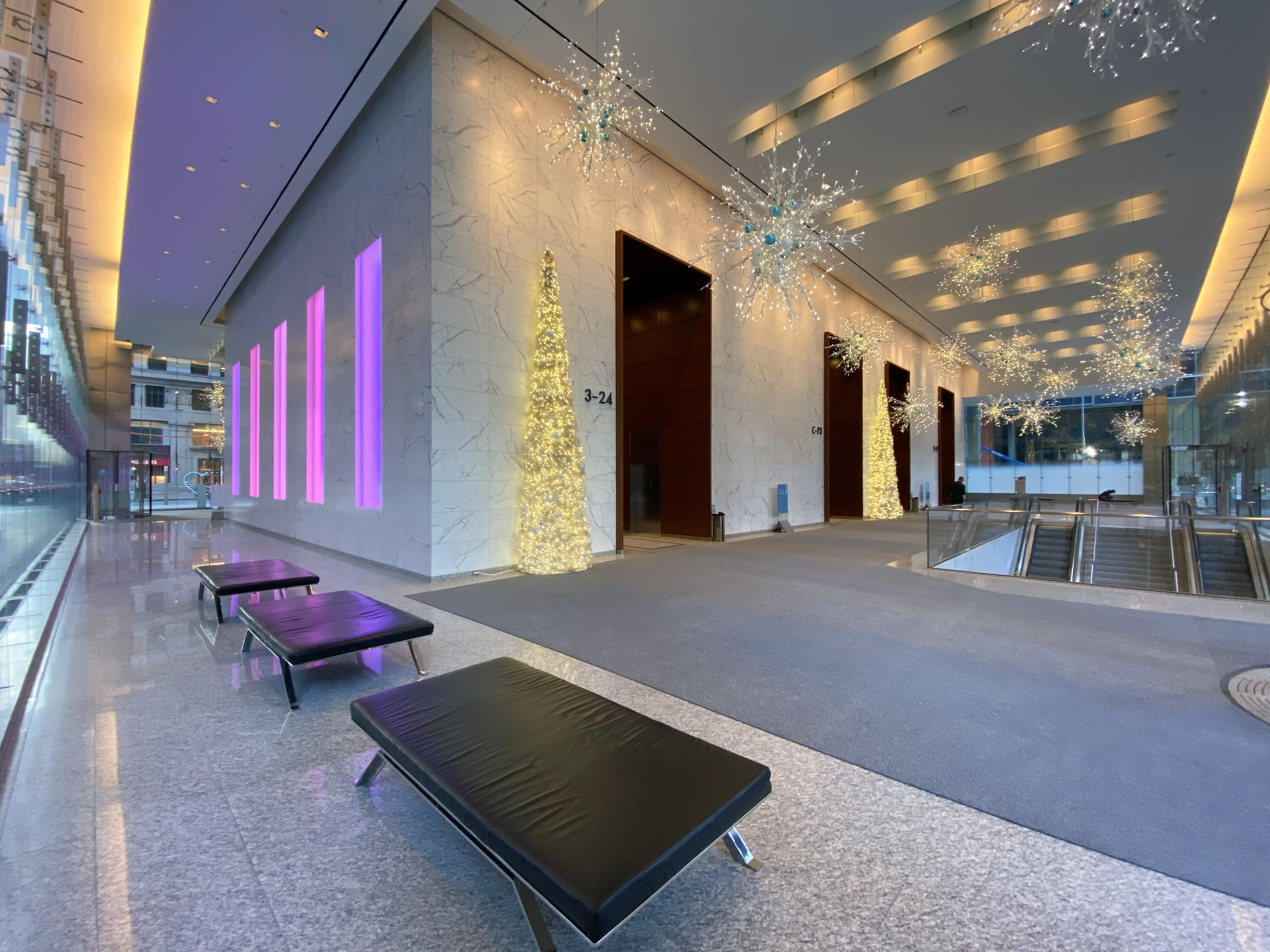
Bay Adelaide West Tower Lobby

In October 2005, plans were filed with the City of Toronto to develop the property. An information sign (notice to amend the by law regulating zoning) was placed on Bay St. between 347 Bay and 355 Bay, both also Brookfield properties. The notice, in short, informed the public that three mixed-use high-rise towers surrounding an urban plaza will be built. The towers were then planned to vary in size from 43 to 50 storeys and contain an aggregate density of 240,396 square metres (2,587,600 sq ft). Brookfield Properties had signed KPMG and Goodmans as anchor tenants for the first tower, Bay Adelaide West, with Fasken Martineau and Heenan Blaikie also taking up residence in the building.

In June 2006, both buildings on Bay Street attached to this property were emptied of tenants and by December 11, 2006, both buildings had been taken down, with the north and west facades of the National Building (347 Bay) being removed for incorporation into the new buildings. The National Building had only been designated a heritage building under the Ontario Heritage Act (Part IV) on September 27, 2006. By December 2006, dismantling of the service shaft stump was complete. Construction of the PATH tunnel north from Scotia Plaza through the Bay Adelaide Centre started in fall 2007. Completion of this section closed the last remaining gap in the north–south route through PATH that parallels Yonge Street, thus eliminating the need to double back from Bay Street to get between buildings located on the eastern edge of PATH.

Bay Adelaide West was completed in 2009 at 51 storeys. It played a primary role in the thriller Devil by M. Night Shyamalan, which was released on September 17, 2010. It is also featured extensively on TV show Suits, being the fictional head office of the law firm Pearson Specter Litt.

In June 2012, Brookfield announced that it planned to commence construction of Bay Adelaide East at 44 storeys and 91,045 square metres (980,000 sq ft), with Deloitte as the anchor tenant.

In August 2018, Brookfield announced that it planned to commence construction of Bay Adelaide North at 32 storeys and 76,180 square metres (820,000 sq ft), with Scotiabank as the anchor tenant. The North tower will complete the three-million-square-foot Bay Adelaide Centre campus.

== Sustainable design ==
The development achieved LEED (Leadership in Energy and Environmental Design) Gold status for the project's environmental sustainability and will produce an estimated 40% energy savings relative to other buildings. The LEED rating system recognizes leading-edge buildings that incorporate design, construction and operational practices that combine healthy, high-quality and high-performance advantages with reduced environmental impacts.

== Communications ==
Bay Adelaide Centre is the first mixed-use, commercial real estate building in North America to launch a mobile app aimed to communicate directly with tenants in the building.

== See also ==
- List of tallest buildings in Toronto
- List of tallest buildings in Canada
- Cloud Gardens
