= Chateau Laurier (web series) =

2018 Canadian web series

Chateau Laurier is a Canadian dramatic web series, which premiered in 2018. A period drama set in 1912, the series stars Kate Ross as Hattie Bracebridge, a young woman who is accompanied by her aunt (Fiona Reid) to the Château Laurier in Ottawa in preparation for an unwanted arranged marriage to Vivian Mutchmor, but has a romantic interlude with a hotel busboy (Luke Humphrey) before discovering that her betrothed husband is not the "old fart" Mr. Mutchmor (Bruce Gray) she thought, but his son, who had himself tried to get out of the arrangement by dressing up as a hotel busboy. The series was Gray's final acting role before his death.

The series was co-created by James Stewart, Kent Staines and Emily Weedon, and written by Kent Staines and Emily Weedon, as proof of concept for a television pilot. Although set in the Chateau Laurier, the series was actually filmed at the Fairmont Royal York hotel in Toronto as Stewart's limited budget did not allow for travel expenses. The series was distributed on Facebook, and quickly became one of the most widely viewed web series in Canadian history, amassing over one million views in its first two weeks on the platform and reaching three million views after two months. Critic John Doyle of The Globe and Mail attributed its success in part to the timing of its debut, as it premiered at a time when the popular Canadian period drama series Murdoch Mysteries and Frankie Drake Mysteries were on hiatus for the 2018 NHL playoffs.

At the 7th Canadian Screen Awards in 2019, the series received a nomination for Best Web Series, Fiction.

A second season of the series entered production in 2021, centred on a power struggle for ownership of the hotel. Ross and Humphrey reprised their roles as the happily married Vivian and Hattie, now heirs to the hotel, while new cast additions included Emmanuel Kabongo, Joel Oulette, Brittany Raymond, Tymika Tafari and Katie Uhlmann. The new season launched on Apple TV in January 2023. Staines and Weedon won the Canadian Screen Award for Best Writing in a Web Program or Series at the 11th Canadian Screen Awards in 2023, for the episode "An Unfortunate Turn of Events".
