= Hockey Night (film) =

1984 Canadian television film

- Written by: Jack Blum; Paul Shapiro
- Directed by: Paul Shapiro
- Starring: Megan Follows; Yannick Bisson; Rick Moranis
- Theme music composer: Fred Mollin
- Country of origin: Canada
- Original language: English

Production
- Producer: Martin Harbury
- Running time: 74 minutes (approx.)
- Production company: CINAR

Original release
- Network: CBC
- Release: December 14, 1984

Hockey Night is a 1984 Canadian coming-of-age television drama film by Canadian screenwriters Jack Blum and Paul Shapiro. It stars Megan Follows, Yannick Bisson, and Rick Moranis. It was released on December 14, 1984.

The film was shot primarily in Parry Sound, Ontario, and arena scenes were filmed at the Centennial Arena in North York, Ontario. It was the feature film debut of future Murdoch Mysteries star Yannick Bisson, and was an early screen appearance for Canadian stage and screen star Megan Follows.

== Plot ==
Cathy Yarrow arrives in Parry Sound, Ontario with her mother and sister from Toronto following the separation of her parents. As the town has no team for girls, she attends tryouts for the local boys' hockey team, and wins a spot as one of the team's goaltenders. Even after she plays well in the first couple of games, the team sponsor indicates displeasure at having a female on the team, and threatens to withdraw his sponsorship. The young players must then decide whether to continue with or without Cathy.

== Restoration ==
In an unusual step for a 1980s made-for-television movie, the film was given a 4K resolution restoration in 2016 and screened theatrically in Toronto and Vancouver.

== See also ==
- Justine Blainey-Broker
- List of films about ice hockey
