= Cloud Gardens =

Public park in Toronto, Ontario, Canada

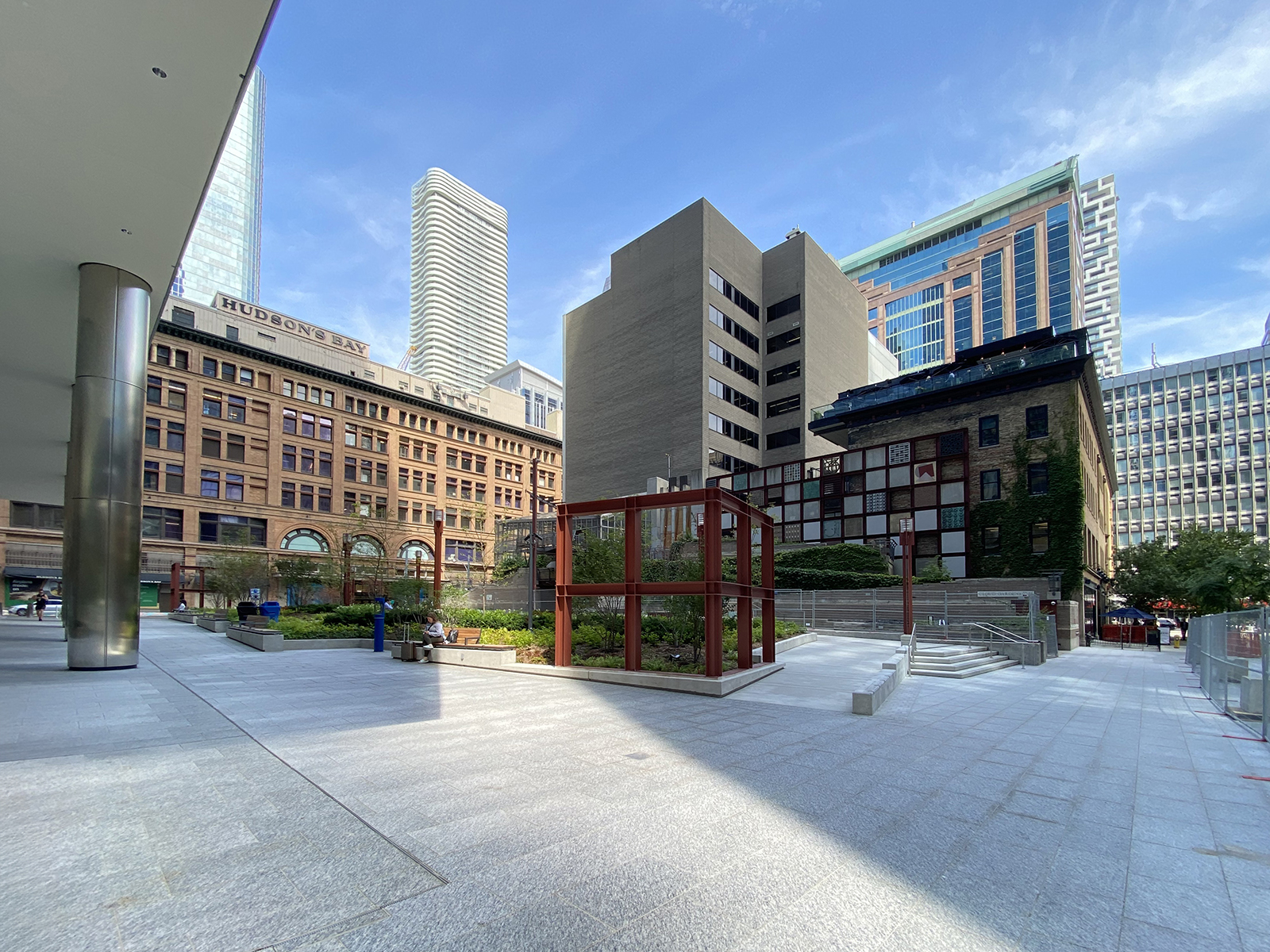
- Cloud Gardens after waterproofing in 2023

- Location within Toronto
- Interactive map of Cloud Gardens
- Type: Public Park
- Location: 14 Temperance Street, Toronto, Ontario, Canada
- Coordinates: 43°39′04″N 79°22′47″W
- Area: 0.6 acres (2,400 m^{2})
- Operator: Toronto Parks
- Website: Cloud Gardens Conservatory

Cloud Gardens or "Bay Adelaide Park" and "Cloud Gardens Conservatory" is a small park in downtown Toronto, Ontario, Canada. It extends from the south side of Richmond Street to the north side of Temperance Street, between Yonge Street and Bay Street, on 0.6 acres (2,400 m^{2}) of land. The park is currently closed for construction and repairs.

== Origin ==
The site was given to the city in the 1980s as part of a deal that allowed the Bay Adelaide Centre to be higher than official plan limits. The developers thus gave a small portion of the lot to the city and spent $5 million to build a park.

== Landscape design and art ==
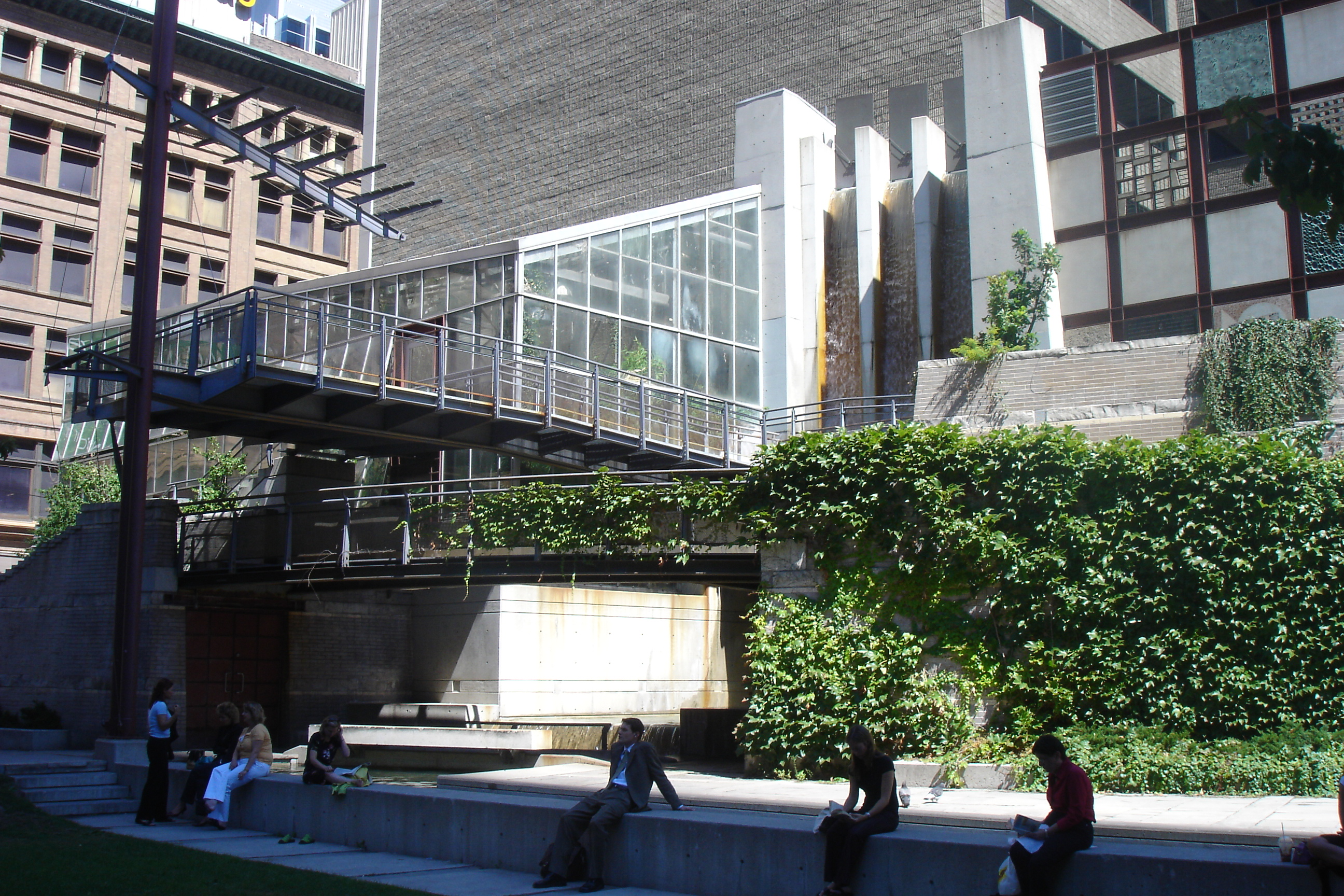
The conservatory (greenhouse) is in the upper left, the waterfall to its right and the outdoor artwork in the upper right

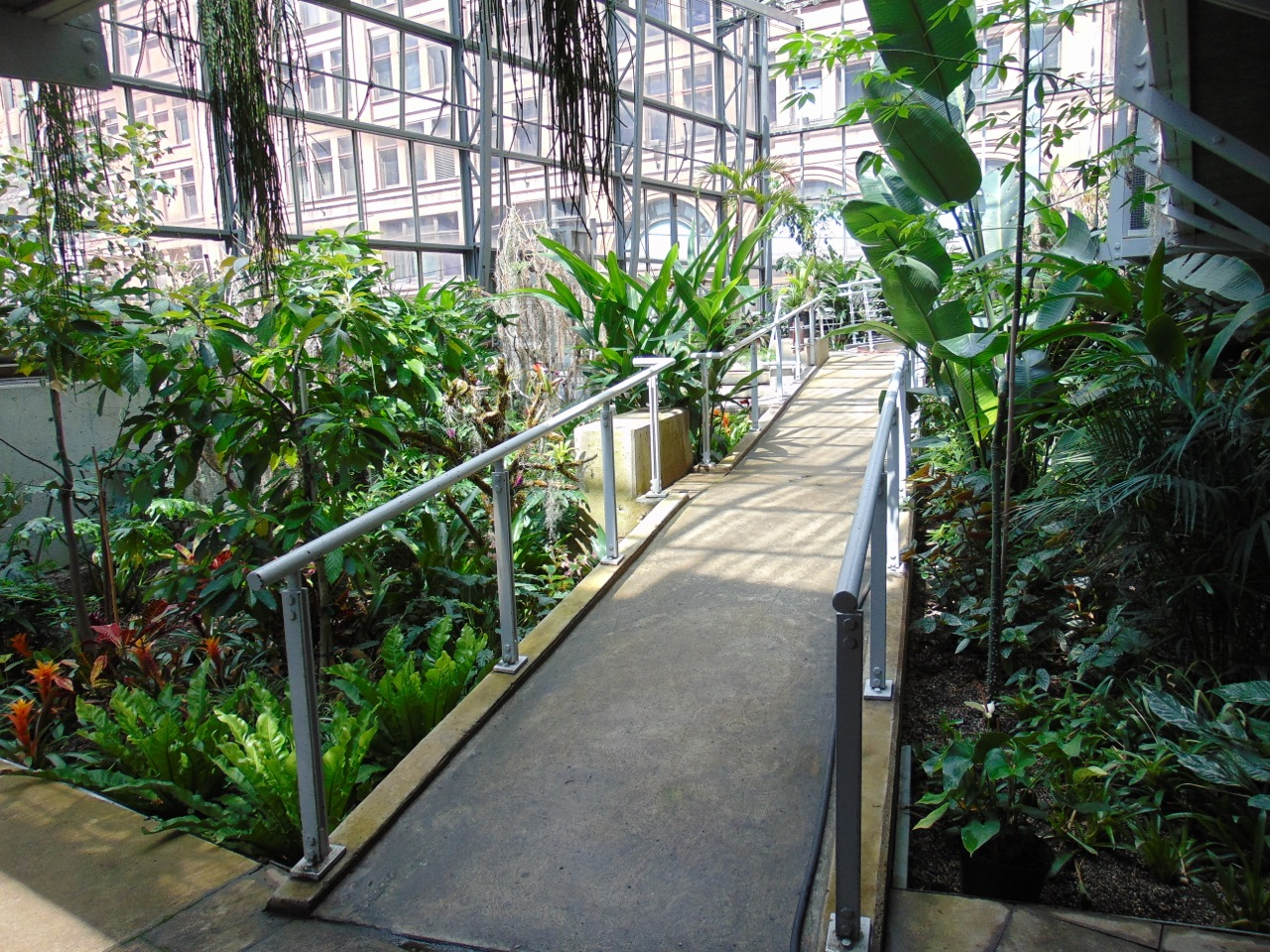
Interior of the glasshouse

Designed by Baird Sampson Neuert Architects, the MBTW Group/Watchorn Architects, and two artists—Margaret Priest and Tony Scherman—the park features elaborate landscape design. The western part of the park includes a network of pathways and is edged by cluster of trees around a semicircular lawn. The eastern portion is marked by series of walkways climbing past a waterfall. Rising above this area is a monument to Toronto's construction workers designed by Margaret Priest and constructed by the Building Trades Union. It comprises squares that each illustrate one of the building trades. Thus one shows a network of steel rebars, another, a cluster of wiring.

The namesake feature of the Gardens is a small greenhouse set to the cool and moist conditions of a cloud rainforest. A walkway runs from the lower-level entrance to an upper-level exit by the waterfall. Cloud Gardens won Baird Sampson Architects a Governor General's Architecture Award.

== Construction ==
The park was closed in November 2018 for construction to replace the waterproofing under the park, and is estimated to reopen in 2026 after the construction of a new building west of the park is complete.

== See also ==
- Bay Adelaide Centre
- The Bay Queen Street
