= Ted Atherton =

Canadian actor

- Born: Winnipeg, Manitoba, Canada
- Education: University of Toronto; University of Calgary
- Occupation: Actor
- Years active: 1997–present

Ted Atherton is a Canadian television and film actor, as well as an accomplished stage actor. His list of stage credits include major roles in Death of a Salesman and The Lion King at the Royal Alexandra, The Cryptogram at the Tarragon Theatre, Hay Fever at the Canadian Stage and The Last Comedy at the Banff Centre. An experienced Shakespearean actor, he has played principal roles in As You Like It at the Du Maurier World Stage, Much Ado About Nothing at the Theatre Calgary, as well as Richard III and All Well That Ends Well at the Stratford Festival. He is best known as Myles Leland III in the TV series Sue Thomas: F.B.Eye.

== Early life ==
He moved with his family to Scarborough, Ontario when he was 13. He went to the University of Toronto and obtained a bachelor's degree in English and Drama. He was also a member of the advanced actors workshop at the Banff Centre for three years.

== Career ==
Atherton acted in the movie and television series Nothing Too Good for a Cowboy in 1998. He also starred in the Prairie Theatre Exchange's comedic production, Bingo! in 2011. He also co-starred for three years on Sue Thomas: F.B.Eye as Myles Leland III.

== Filmography ==
=== Television ===
| Year | Title | Role | Notes |
|---|---|---|---|
| 1997 | Traders | | 1 episode |
| 1998 | Nothing Too Good for a Cowboy | Panhandle Phillips | TV movie |
| 1998 | La Femme Nikita | Ray Leeds | 1 episode |
| 1998 | Rescuers: Stories of Courage: Two Families | SS Soldier #1 | TV movie |
| 1998–2000 | Nothing Too Good for a Cowboy | Panhandle Phillips | 26 episodes |
| 1999 | Joan of Arc | Jean d'Estivet | Miniseries |
| 1999 | The City | Barns | 1 episode |
| 1999 | Switching Goals | Mitch | TV movie |
| 2000 | Santa Who? | George | TV movie |
| 2001 | The Associates | Ned Waterston | 1 episode |
| 2001–2004 | Blue Murder | Pete Milbourne / P.C. Gerald Passmore | 2 episodes |
| 2002 | Whitewash: The Clarence Brandley Story | James Robinson | TV movie |
| 2002 | Street Time | Larry Atwood | 2 episodes |
| 2002–2005 | Sue Thomas: F.B.Eye | Myles Leland III | Main role |
| 2004 | A Bear Named Winnie | Captain Elliot | TV movie |
| 2004 | Ace Lightning | Kilobyte (voice) | 11 episodes |
| 2005 | Time Warp Trio | Meriwether Lewis (voice) | 1 episode |
| 2006 | Tangled Webs | Older Man at Bar | |
| 2006 | This Is Wonderland | Paul Tiernay | 1 episode |
| 2006 | Find | Professor | Short |
| 2006 | Candles on Bay Street | Ross | TV movie |
| 2007 | The Company | Frank Wisner | Miniseries |
| 2007 | 'Til Death Do Us Part (Love You to Death) | Matthew | 1 episode |
| 2007 | Everest '82 | Eric Paxton | Miniseries |
| 2007–2012 | Degrassi: The Next Generation | Randall Edwards | 10 episodes |
| 2008 | Degrassi Spring Break Movie | Randall Edwards | TV movie |
| 2008 | An Old Fashioned Thanksgiving | Mr. Hopkins | TV movie |
| 2008 | XIII: The Conspiracy | Wally Sheridan | Miniseries |
| 2008 | The Andromeda Strain | Edward "Ed" Dewitt | Miniseries |
| 2008–2010 | The Border | Clifford Holland | 16 episodes |
| 2009 | 'Da Kink in My Hair | Executive #2 | 1 episode |
| 2009 | The National Tree | Aaron | TV movie |
| 2009–2010 | Cra$h & Burn | Stan/Sam | 2 episodes |
| 2009, 2017, 2024 | Murdoch Mysteries | Professor Albert Godfrey/Preacher Jimmy Wilde | 3 episodes |
| 2010 | Who Is Clark Rockefeller? | Detective John Ryan | TV movie |
| 2010 | Pure Pwnage | Doug's Lawyer | 1 episode |
| 2010 | The Santa Suit | Bryce Hunter | TV movie |
| 2010–2011 | Blue Mountain State | Dean Simon | 4 episodes |
| 2011 | King | Dr. John Telsun | 1 episode |
| 2011 | XIII: The Series | Wally Sheridan | 1 season |
| 2011 | Haven | Ben Keegan | 1 episode |
| 2011 | John A.: Birth of a Country | Governor General Charles Monck | TV movie |
| 2012 | Fairly Legal | Jerry Blankstein | 1 episode |
| 2012 | An Officer and a Murderer | Minister Shaw | TV movie |
| 2012 | Zac & Penny | Thelonious (voice) | TV movie |
| 2012–2016, 2024–2025 | Fugget About It | Special Agent Strait McCool / Juan Carlos (voice) | Main role |
| 2013 | Transporter: The Series | Stanwick | 1 episode |
| 2013 | Lost Girl | Bob Hamelin | 1 episode |
| 2013 | Bomb Girls | Detective Prentiss | 1 episode |
| 2013 | Suits | Judge Henderson | 1 episode |
| 2014 | Reign | Lord Hugo | 2 episodes |
| 2014 | The Good Witch's Wonder | Adam | TV movie |
| 2015 | Good Witch | Darryl Blankenship | 1 episode |
| 2015–2016 | Rogue | Robert Richmond / Robert Holdsworth / Bob Richmond | 5 episodes |
| 2016 | The Package | Pick-Up Guy | Short |
| 2017 | The Kennedys: After Camelot | Ted Sorensen | Miniseries |
| 2017 | Killjoys | Gander | 7 episodes |
| 2017 | Heartland | Nathan Stockwell | 1 episode |
| 2017 | Christmas Wedding Planner | Tim | TV movie |
| 2017–2018 | The Expanse | Lawrence Strickland | 10 episodes |
| 2018 | Max Voltage | | Voice |
| 2019 | Diggstown | Judge Ballard | 1 episode |
| 2019 | Ransom | Travis Beaton | 1 episode |
| 2019 | Departure | Commander Foster | 2 episodes |
| 2019 | Anne with an E | Mr. Rose | 2 episodes |
| 2019 | Hudson & Rex | Dr. Reginald Meade | 1 episode |
| 2019 | V-Wars | Senator Smythe | 4 episodes |
| 2019 | Grounded for Christmas | Bert | TV movie |
| 2021 | Private Eyes | 1 episode | "Murder They Wrote" as Percy Voss |

=== Film ===
| Year | Title | Role | Notes |
|---|---|---|---|
| 2006 | Hollywoodland | Detective Doug Johnson | |
| 2006 | Tangled Webs | Older Man at Bar | |
| 2007 | The Stone Angel | Reverend Troy | |
| 2008 | Max Payne | Detective Shipman | |
| 2008 | An Old Fashioned Thanksgiving | Mr. Hopkins | |
| 2010 | Arctic Blast | Randall | |
| 2014 | Guidance | The Real Roland Brown | |
| 2015 | River | Patrick Reardon | |
| 2016 | Standoff | The Priest | Credited as Tim Atherton |
| 2017 | Trench 11 | Major Jennings | |
| 2019 | Goalie | Louis Sawchuk | |
| 2019 | Rabid | Dr. William Burroughs | |
| 2021 | Crisis | University Lawyer | |
| 2022 | The Fight Machine | Jack Harris | |

=== Video games ===
| Year | Title | Role | Notes |
|---|---|---|---|
| 2018 | Far Cry 5 | Zip Kupka (voice) | |
| 2018 | Starlink: Battle for Atlas | Victor St. Grand (voice) | |
