= Richmond P. Hobson Jr. =

American-Canadian author (1907–1966)

Richmond Pearson Hobson Jr. (November 27, 1907 – August 9, 1966) was an American-Canadian author who wrote memoirs of his life as a rancher in British Columbia. His books, Grass Beyond the Mountains, Nothing Too Good for a Cowboy and The Rancher Takes a Wife, inspired the CBC drama series Nothing Too Good for a Cowboy.

== Biography ==
Born in Washington, D.C., in 1907, he was the son of Grizelda Houston Hull Hobson and Richmond Pearson Hobson. His father was a congressman, a U.S. Navy admiral and a decorated veteran of the Spanish–American War. Hobson attended Stanford University before moving to Wyoming and forming a partnership with Panhandle "Pan" Phillips. The pair traveled north to British Columbia in the early 1930s, formed the Frontier Cattle Company and established Home Ranch north of Anahim Lake in the Chilcotin. When his partnership with Phillips ended in the 1940s, Hobson moved to the Vanderhoof area and continued ranching. He and his wife Gloria (1921–1986) lived on River Ranch, south of Vanderhoof. He died there in 1966.

Hobson's first book, Grass Beyond the Mountains (1951), recalled his early years in British Columbia and the hardships he and Phillips endured in establishing their ranch. It was first published in serial form by Maclean's magazine. The next volume, Nothing Too Good for a Cowboy (1955), covered the difficulties of maintaining the ranch during the shortages caused by World War II. His final book, The Rancher Takes a Wife (1961), detailed his life as a married rancher in Vanderhoof.

He died August 8, 1966, from a coronary attack.
