= List of Traders episodes =

Traders premiered on February 1, 1996. Five seasons of the series were broadcast on Global between 1996 and 2000.

== Series overview ==
Season	Episodes	Originally released	
Season	Episodes	First released	Last released
1	13	February 1, 1996	1996
2	13	1996	1997
3	22	1997	May 3, 1998
4	22	October 15, 1998	April 29, 1999
5	13	December 2, 1999	March 9, 2000

== Episodes ==
=== Season 1 (1996) ===
No. overall	No. in season	Title	Directed by	Written by	Original release date
1	1	"Options"	Kari Skogland	David Shore and Jack Blum & Sharon Corder	February 1, 1996
Jack Larkin, a Vancouver-based trader with Gardner Ross, shows up at their Toronto office with a plan to move from the trading floor into corporate finance. He meets with Cedric Ross, the eponymous controlling shareholder of Gardner Ross, who initially balks at the idea of making him an investment banker but agrees to further consideration if Jack can land a coveted mining company IPO (Initial Public Offering) for firm. Jack hustles to find the location of a poker game that the owner of Graykirk Mining, Gerald Graykirk, is playing and bribes his way into the game. During the poker game Jack connects with Gerald Graykirk and, while sharing a limousine ride later, convinces him to let Gardiner Ross lead the IPO. Despite an attempt to undermine the deal by Adam, Gardner Ross leads the Graykirk IPO, taking 40% of the $300M issue but endangers its ability to survive to do so. The firm only survives the offering with some deft (and questionable) market maneuvering led by Jack and the head trader, Marty Stephens. As per his deal with Sally, Jack becomes a director of Gardner Ross. After ignoring a securities commission investigator, Cedric Ross is dramatically arrested at the firm for embezzlement. In detention, it is implied that since Ross previously had dealings with the judge who refused to grant him bail on the grounds that he might be a flight risk, his lawyer might be justified in arguing that judicial bias is the cause for his bail to be denied. Later, while still in prison, Cedric Ross has a heart attack. Back at Gardner Ross, the directors of the firm are discussing an offer from a larger investment bank when the economist daughter of Cedric, Sally Ross, enters. Her father has transferred his controlling share of the firm to her to prevent Adam Cunningham from selling Gardner out to a larger investment bank.
2	2	"Pennies from Heaven"	Alan Taylor	Story by : Tim Southam and Jack Blum & Sharon Corder; Teleplay by : Jack Blum & Sharon Corder and David Shore	1996
At the beginning of the show, Marty fires several of the trading staff after they leave the floor in response to a fire alarm while in the midst of executing a large trade. Jack approaches Navadyne, a GPS company with highly marketable technology products but lacking management expertise and capital to meet demand for its products. In looking for a suitable investor for Navadyne, Jack finds the perfect match in an aviation company owned by a recluse. When Jack and Donald D'Arby show up at his office, he refuses to see them but learn that he is a client of Ann Krywarik at Gardner Ross. Ann, who wants a new desk, initially refuses to help Jack access her client until Jack challenges her to a game of pool. If he wins, she will introduce him to her reclusive client. If she wins, he will get her a new desk. The following day, Jack gets a pool lesson from his father. When they play, Ann is about to win when Jack suckers her into a side bet causing her to lose. Later on, they manage to convince Ann's eccentric client to buy Navadyne. Jack and Ann begin a relationship soon after. Sally asks Marty to curtail practices on the trading floor to avoid any securities commission inquiries until her father has been cleared of charges but Marty refuses. Adam uses an old contact to get $25M of a British railroad privatization offering for the firm but the issue does not include a market out clause. Marty wants Benny Siedleman, an aging floor trader and his former boss to join his desk traders but Adam refuses. Sally later offers to move Benny from the trading floor to a trading desk on the condition that Marty cuts down on his questionable transactions to avoid any further scrutiny from the securities commission.
3	3	"Bad is Good"	Kari Skogland	David Shore	1996
Cedric is offered a plea bargain by the prosecution. Doubting that the prosecution's case is strong, he rejects it. At the end of the episode, Sally figures out that the securities commission made an illegal search and seizure in obtaining evidence on her father and the case against him is dropped. The firm decides to restrict trading in Navadyne, a GPS company, while Marty has a large short position. Rather than face serious and potentially unlimited losses as the stock rises, Marty defies orders and covers the short position anyway. Donald informs Adam that the British rail offer does not have a market out clause, meaning that the price is guaranteed by Gardner Ross. As the price of British rail drops, the firm loses money. Adam later punches a hole in the wall of his office when he finds out. The reclusive aviation company owner changes his mind about Navadyne when he learns of the management problems it has. Unknown to Jack, Navadyne has used another investment bank to raise more capital with a rights issue. Furious when he finds out, Jack tells them that they need management more than cash. Jack returns to the reclusive aviation company owner and offers him a bought deal where Gardner Ross shoulders all of the risk but finds out that the firm cannot legally meet that capital requirements because of losses on British rail. In order to raise capital quickly, Jack finds a brilliant but socially awkward derivatives trader name Grant Jansky and hires him. Jack gives Grant 3 hours to make $1.8M so the firm can legally underwrite the bought deal he offered the reclusive aviation company owner.
4	4	"The King Is Dead..."	Alan Taylor	Story by : Mark Shekter; Teleplay by : David Shore	1996
Ben is moved from the trading floor at the exchange to a trading desk at the firm as Sally promised. After having lost the case the against Cedric, the securities commission puts Gardner Ross under further scrutiny. In doing so, they uncover Marty's trades in the Navadyne while it was restricted. Susannah Marks, the firm's analyst, suspects a company's reported financial numbers are cooked and resists pressure from the others to make a buy recommendation. Sally backs her. They later find out she was right. Susannah gets a call from an accented man claiming that a recommendation she made cause him to lose money. He threateningly tells her to make a positive recommendation on a construction company. Susannah finds a funds transfer document that has been misfiled and gives it to Sally. After seeing it Sally goes to a ministry that her father allegedly embezzled funds from to talk to the Reverend, who is under RCMP surveillance. The securities commission calls Jack in on his day off for questioning. In answering their questions, he intentionally misleads them. After obtaining a search warrant, the securities commission's ensuing investigation disrupts the firm's day-to-day operations. Gardner Ross knows the investigation will not stop until the securities commission finds something prosecutable so they allow the commission to suspend Marty to halt the ongoing investigation. Marty is suspended for 30 days to avoid having them investigate the firm further. In a walk together, Cedric tells Sally that he didn't embezzle the money, he earned it. After Cedric returns to the firm and admits to Sally that he and the Reverend embezzled the funds, she refuses to return control of Gardner Ross to him. At the end of the episode, Cedric publicly announces his retirement. Jack's father is diagnosed with lung cancer.
5	5	"...Long Live The King"	Kari Skogland	Tim Southam	1996
A European pulp mill approaches Gardner Ross to acquire Donald's family's forestry company. Since Donald is the firm's resource industry specialist, the directors decide they cannot do the deal without him. Donald initially refuses to participate in structuring the bid for his family's firm but Jack forces him to work on the acquisition. Jack and Donald meet with a major Montreal pension fund that holds shares in Donald's family's forestry firm. Donald's father is unexpectedly present at the meeting. The shareholders initially tell them they will not sell their stake to the bidder and Jack gets up to leave the meeting. Before he leaves, Donald asks the shareholder if he would be interested in shares of the pulp and paper firm. When the fund replies that they would, Donald proposes a deal structure that would include a provision allowing him to swap shares of his father's firm for shares in the acquiring firm. The shareholders point out that since the acquiring firm is foreign and the shareholder's fund cannot invest more than 20% of its holdings in foreign equities, the share swap would push the value of the fund's foreign holdings above 20% so they are not interested in a swap. Donald shows how he could create a structure to get around the 20% maximum foreign equity restriction. Donald's father responds by pointing out that his firm has a money losing mill in Quebec that would likely be shut down if taken over by the foreign firm. He offers to guarantee that the money losing mill will be kept open for 3 years if the fund retains its shares in his company. The employee pension fund agrees not to sell its stake. Before he leaves, his father tells him to move out of the family home. Adam and Sally make Benny head trader for the duration of Marty's absence but, due to his computer illiteracy, new environment and lack of experience, he is ineffective. Benny gets caught taking orders from Marty and is stripped of his position as temporary head trader. He is replaced by Chris. Susannah ignores a faxed threat but Monika Barnes, the research assistant, shows it to Sally who, despite Susannah's objections, hires a bodyguard for her. Susannah receives another threat over the telephone. At the end of the episode, Susannah's daughter is kidnapped for a few minutes and taken to the firm by a stranger with instructions to tell her: "There is always more than one target." Marty is bored at home but while watching TV, he notices a news story that might be material to the traders and calls Benny to tell him about it. Benny acts on the story. Marty breaks his suspension by illegally feeding trading ideas to Benny.
6	6	"From Russia with Love"	George Mendeluk	Sharon Corder & Jack Blum	1996
The show begins with the police investigating threats against Susannah and her family. Susannah is advised by the police to stay home. The firm's traders do not know about the extortion attempt and proceed to speculate on why she is not at work. To the irritation of the officer investigating Susannah's case, Adam pulls rank on him to in an attempt to ensure the case gets special attention. While at home, Susannah wrestles with her dilemma on whether or not to cave in to the extortionist's demands. Adam dumps a record company IPO he expects to be a money loser on Jack and asks Grant to find a way for the firm to hedge itself on the record company offering. After insulting the lead broker for the record company IPO, Jack later approaches him with a request to restructure the deal. After failing with the lead on the record company deal, Jack and Donald approach the company directly with their deal restructuring proposal. As soon as the record company starts trading, the firm's traders, who see it as a dog, sell it as quickly as they can. As the stock price of the record company rises, the position that Adam ordered Grant to set up to bet on its fall loses money quickly. Ann is approached by a new but potentially high-risk client that Jack met at a poker game. Later, the wife of Ann's new client meets with her to tell her that her husband is an unemployed compulsive gambler. Ann later decides not to place the high-risk call options order he gave her. As it rises, she becomes distraught and runs to Jack for consolation. After the compulsive gambler's call drops in value, he angrily storms the trading floor when he finds out the value of the call option he asked Ann to place would have caused huge losses. Chris receives a recommendation from Monika and takes an opposite course of action to what she recommended. Adam later dresses Chris down for not following her recommendation. Sally discovers some unusual buying activity in the stock of the company the extortionist told Susannah to recommend. She approaches the executing broker to reveal the name of the client but he refuses. At Sally's behest, Monika looks through investment newsletters for situations where an analyst has reversed his recommendation in a short time frame and finds another analyst at another firm who has probably been extorted. Sally meets the analyst but he refuses to admit any extortion has taken place. Later, he arranges a private night meeting in a park with Susannah. The extortionist is a Russian mobster. The other analyst tells Susannah that he initially did not comply with the mobsters until they broke his leg. Ann discovers a biotechnology firm that might be able to help treat Jack's father's lung cancer.
7	7	"Dancing with Mr. D."	Alex Chapple	Hart Hanson	1996
Chris and Benny get into a fistfight on the trading floor. In response, Adam demotes Chris from head trader. While Susannah is working late at night, she hears an unexpected sound after her bodyguard has gone to the kitchen for coffee. When she goes to investigate, she is frightened by Jack and sprays him with pepper spray in her surprise. The following morning, she decides to cave in to the Russian mobsters and make the false recommendation but Sally decides to hire the broker who made the suspicious trades so they can find out who the extortionist is. Apart from Adam, all shareholders of the firm vote to purchase the extortionist's broker's firm at 4 times its value so they can uncover the identity of the extortionist. Before they are able to make the purchase, Adam meets with the owner of the extortionist's firm and offers to pay him the market value of the firm in cash but with the understanding that the money will be used to invest in a company as directed by Adam that will result in a payoff higher than the asking price of the extortionist's firm on the condition that the extortionist's broker never become part of Gardner Ross. The extortionist's broker accepts the offer. With the broker's client list, members of the firm figure out who the extortionist is and report it to the police but they do not have enough evidence to take any action. When Susannah relents again, Adam threatens to make a press release stating that her changed recommendation resulted from extortion. The extortionist appears at Gardner Ross after hours and threatens Susannah's family again. After seeing this, Jack approaches a more powerful gangster he inadvertently laundered money for in Vancouver for help. When the more powerful gangster offers to help in exchange for an unspecified favor at an unspecified time, Jack and Susannah leave. Susannah decides to get a gun. The extortionist humbly tells Susannah that he will not longer harass her and her family. Realizing that Jack, at some risk to himself, intervened by returning to the more powerful mobster to ask for help, Susannah thanks him. Unfortunately their victory is bittersweet. Her husband moves for a separation. At his wife's request, Marty joins group therapy for men who have lost their jobs. He ridicules them at first but the therapist appears to reach Marty when he suggests that Marty wasn't popular in high school and lost his virginity late. When Marty gets home from therapy later, he is more reflective. During his suspension, Marty contemplates a career change. The following morning at the director's meeting, Marty announces that he will not be returning to the firm. While Adam and Sally wish Marty well on his change in direction while standing in view of the trading floor, Marty begins to miss being a trader and changes his mind. He negotiates better employment terms and agrees to return to the trading floor. Jack introduces his father to a doctor from a biotechnology firm who is working on an experimental treatment for his condition but, due to the expense, the firm has not clinically tested the treatment on humans. Jack later sleeps with his father's new doctor. The doctor from the biotechnology firm agrees to go public to raise money for further testing of her drug. Jack later learns from his father that tests of the drug had been done on humans in Europe. Jack confronts the doctor over the death of a patient during a trial of her experimental drug, a fact she had not disclosed to him and Donald. She tells him that, unknown to him, she has already begun administering the drug to his father. Jack decides not to take her company public. Jack later has a change of heart decides to continue with the biotechnology IPO. Jack's father tells him that he's proud of him for closing what he considers a meaningful deal. Grant figures out that there will be a tragedy in Guatemala and tells Chris who proceeds to trade on speculation of disaster there. As Grant predicted, disaster strikes in Guatemala. When he finds out Chris only used the information to make a profitable trade and did not warn the authorities, Grant angrily punches him.
8	8	"Into that Good Night"	George Mendeluk	Robert Sandler & Allen Booth	1996
As Marty returns to the trading floor after his 30-day suspension, Jack is rushing his father to the hospital emergency ward suffering from flu symptoms. Chris uses a handicapped parking sticker from a car inherited from his grandfather and brags about it. The firm's legal counsel tells Chris he received a call from the securities commission about him using his deceased grandfather's parking sticker. Adam later calls Chris into his office to tell him that the commission will be investigating his use of the handicapped parking sticker. During the discussion, Adam decides they will tell the securities commission that Chris temporarily lost his mind. Near the end of the episode, Chris is called into a meeting with a man in a wheelchair supposedly from the securities commission over his use of the disabled parking sticker. Unknown to him, the whole firm is watching and the disabled parking sticker investigation is a prank set up by Marty. After being humiliated, Chris decides to quit until Marty changes his mind but soon after Marty plays another prank on Chris by handcuffing him to a door. In Jack's absence, Sally, who has no investment banking experience, tries to handle an acquisition by herself but she is rudely blown off by the client because she has no street reputation as an investment banker. After some positive encouragement from Donald, Sally decides to further pursue the prospective client who had rudely dismissed her. Encouraged, she discovers that the prospect sits on the board of a symphony orchestra charity and becomes a member of the orchestra fund-raising committee with a donation. Sally meets with the prospect who had blown her off earlier at the symphony charity event and after intimating that she will handle either the takeover or the defense, successfully arranges a meeting for the following day. While there, Sally introduces herself to a conductor named Anton and asks him out for dinner. During Marty's suspension, the firm has lost many large clients. In order to regain stature, Marty begins accumulating shares in a telecommunications firm that he knows a large client will need to buy that day before he expects to receive the order from the client. Alarmed at the size of the position Marty has built on margin, Adam orders Marty to call the large client but is rebuffed. Not long after, Marty calls the client who buys the block from him but Gardner Ross loses on the trade. Marty asserts that the loss was necessary to restore his reputation. Susannah's husband sues for custody of their child. Jack's father goes into a coma. As per his father's request, Jack visits his sister Cathy to give her a ring that belonged to their mother. Not long before passing on, Jack's father briefly comes out of a coma and expresses his love for him.
9	9	"Rumours"	E. Jane Thompson	Tim Southam	1996
While watching the director's meeting, Benny uses his lip-reading skills to find out that they plan to fire staff thus touching off mass speculation amongst staff members. When asked by Monika, Susannah assures her that she will not be laid off. Meanwhile, Adam hires a termination consultant to help the firm avoid any lawsuits from laid off employees. Grant interrupts the executive meeting with the termination consultant and asks that he be the first to be laid off but since his activities are highly profitable to the firm, they refuse. In order to save his job, Chris shorts the Danish Krona and then starts a rumor about Denmark holding a referendum on withdrawing from the European Union with a less reputable wire service. Unknown to Chris, Benny piggybacks and both earn a profit making it less likely that either will be laid off. Jack is away from the firm attending to his father's affairs. Sally's first investment banking client threatens to pull her takeover bid unless Gardner Ross can increase her stake in the takeover target from 3% to 10% by the end of the day, a near impossible request to fulfill. Marty finds someone who holds a large block of the pipeline company they are bidding on. The holder is a friend of Adam's so at the request of the other directors, Adam takes him out to lunch to encourage him to sell his stake. As soon as Adam leaves the executive committee meeting with the termination consultant, the others vote to terminate her. In an effort to land an investment banking deal of his own and avoid being laid off, Donald gives a prospective client who wants to build a UFO sanctuary on some land he owns consideration but Jack instructs Donald to blow him off. Despite Jack's orders to drop the deal, Donald commits the firm to it. Monika suggest that Donald structure the UFO sanctuary deal as a UFO theme park to make it more palatable to prospective investors. When Donald tells Jack of his idea to pitch the deal as a UFO theme park instead of a sanctuary, Jack reconsiders. After losing several clients, Ann goes to Grant for help hoping he might be able to figure out what they all have in common. To her surprise, he tells her that they all dined at the same private club together that day. He knows because he visited a friend who was working in the kitchen that day. Grant tries to get laid off by losing money but ends up earning money for the firm instead. During a debate on who will be laid off, Adam announces to the other directors that the friend he had lunch with who owns a large block of the target pipeline company has agreed to sell it at a dollar over the market price. He also informs Sally that he expects half of her advisory fee for helping her. Just as the trading floor is about to begin a stealth buy of the pipeline, the share price starts to rise, indicating that someone leaked the upcoming takeover bid. Sally asks Marty to start a rumor that she is handling the takeover hoping that the share price will not be bid up so quickly. The UFO sanctuary prospect is angered by Donald's theme park proposal. Donald wants to announce the failed deal to the board but Jack doesn't want him to because Donald's estranged father could prevent him from getting another job in the industry. To protect Donald's job, Jack lies to Adam telling him that Donald is gay and therefore a lawsuit risk in the case of dismissal. Monika and a trader get laid off. Angered by the leak, Sally's bidder storms the trading floor and drops the deal. After talking to Grant, the UFO sanctuary client warms up to the firm.
10	10	"The Enemy Within"	George Mendeluk	David Cole	1996
The episode begins with the director's meeting to find out who leaked the pipeline bid they lost in the previous episode. In response, they decide to enact tighter surveillance measures at the firm. Donald discovers that a bond trader at another firm bought shares in the pipeline before it was announced. Sally meets with the bond trader at a church. The bond trader tells her that, while having lunch in a clam restaurant, he heard a voice say that the pipeline company Sally's client was bidding on is going to be bought. Seeing nobody around him, he thought the voice came from God and proceeded to buy shares in the pipeline. Sally and Anton go to the restaurant where the bond trader who bought shares of the target pipeline company thought he heard voices from God. They discover an acoustic anomaly causing sound from one table to be clearly heard at another table. Sally asks the waiter to find out who was sitting at both tables the day that the bond trader thought he heard the voice God. In hopes that the employee with the most to lose will expose himself/herself as the leak, Adam announces mandatory drug testing even though it's illegal. Upset at the drug testing announcement, Ann confides to Benny that she doesn't want to take the urine test because she has something to hide. Later, in an effort to defend Ann, Benny makes an outburst on the trading floor over the rumored drug testing while Adam is watching, leading Adam to believe that Benny was the leak. Adam, Marty and a compliance officer are having a heated discussion because Adam, sure that he is the leak, wants to fire Benny when Sally intervenes after finding out that the trader who bought the pipeline after thinking he heard God's voice actually heard Adam at another table. Sally then forces Adam to acknowledge to the rest of the firm that he was the leak. Adam later issues a statement acknowledging his impropriety. Ann later thanks Benny for protecting her. Adam returns to the restaurant with the acoustic anomaly to listen in on conversations. Jack and Donald are approached by a Jewish man who wants to buy a company that made a catalytic agent that was used to rapidly decompose bodies, including those of his parents, during the Holocaust. His sole reason for wanting to buy the company is to dismantle it. Today, the catalytic agent is successfully sold as a composting product. Although the company was never tried, the grandson of the founders runs it today. When Jack and Donald come up with a way for their Jewish prospect to destroy the company he is targeting, he engages them. The Jewish client buys the target company's debt at a premium and then Jack commissions Susannah and the firm's lawyer to find a reason to send a receiver into the company. They discover that the company went above their debt to book equity ratio thereby putting them in breach of a loan agreement before the Jewish client bought their debt. Since the previous debt holder did not waive the breach, it gives the new debt holder the right to send the company into receivership but after visiting the company that his client intends to destroy, seeing how well it treats its employees and realizing that those employees are innocent of any wrongdoing, Jack has second thoughts about destroying the firm. Jack tells the grandson of the company founder that their real intent is to destroy his company and then proposes an alternative plan involving a transfer of the catalytic agent patent to his client instead of destroying the company but the grandson rudely dismisses him. Although the catalytic agent company has hundreds of employees, they do not employ any Blacks or Asians. They also were the subject of a complaint alleging unfair employment practices recently. While they are discussing this, a Gardner Ross lawyer enters with an injunction filed by the catalytic agent company on the grounds that the receiver was appointed in bad faith. Jack is required to appear in court the following morning. In court, Jack lies under oath and later puts the company into receivership. Marty pressures Chris to get rid of a stock he has a large position in. Unable to offload it to any of his institutional clients, Chris tricks Ann into getting one of her retail clients to buy some. Ann later confronts him after her client transfers his account as a result of significant losses. The client Chris caused Ann to lose returns to her. Jack's sister Cathy, who has been laid off, shows up at the firm to ask him for a job. In order to help her, Jack asks Susannah to hire his sister. While at the clam restaurant, Anton confesses to Sally that he is married, putting an end to their relationship.
11	11	"Sharper Than a Serpent's Tooth"	Holly Dale	Sondra Kelly	1996
The episode begins with the directors discussing a bank offer. When Sally suggests that she is in favor of accepting the offer, Jack responds that he will resign as soon as the takeover occurs. Later, the acquiring bank stipulates that either Adam or Jack must stay with Gardner Ross for the deal to go through but Adam refuses the 3 year lock in period. Adam tries to convince Jack to take the bank offer and agree to the lock in period, but he refuses. Adam asks a competing investment banker named Ian to join Gardner Ross so the deal with the acquiring bank can go through without Adam having to stay for 3 years. When Ian tells him that Jack's sister bought the target cosmetics firm on insider information, Adam decides to blackmail Jack into staying but it doesn't work. Jack forces his sister to quit instead. During a shareholder's meeting adjourned to vote on the bank's bid, Sally does an about-face and votes against accepting the bid. She suggests going public to increase the firm's capital base and acquire a merchant bank. At the end of the episode, upset that the bank will not be acquired and he will have to continue in the business for longer, Adam is consoled by his ailing wife. Jack and Donald agree to handle a leveraged buyout of a cosmetics firm owned by the mother of the hostile bidder. While Gardner Ross is acquiring shares of the target cosmetics firm on behalf of its client, one of the suppliers of the target cosmetics firm acts as a white knight by also making takeover bid of the cosmetics firm. The white knight supplier is run by the godson of the bidder's mother whose firm is targeted. In response to the competing bid for her mother's firm, the daughter raises her bid. Confused and frustrated, Jack asks Sally for help. Sally immediately decides to start buying shares in the acquiring cosmetics supplier as a bluff. The bluff works when the supplier withdraws the bid for the cosmetics company. Later, Sally sets up a meeting between mother and daughter and between Jack and Ian, the competing banker. When Sally leaves the women alone, they work out their differences and decide to jointly acquire the cosmetics supplier. When his computer crashes, Grant falls for a female technician named Magda who fixes it. She feels the same way but, with him being socially awkward, he does not know how to ask her out so he sabotages the firm's network so he can see her again. When she arrives, with Donald's assistance, he asks her out. After she agrees, he restores the network. Cathy tries to interest members of the firm in shares of a company that makes macaroni dinners that she likes. Susannah ignores her but Chris profits from buying stock in the company. Claiming to have accepted a higher paying job at another firm, Cathy quits.
12	12	"The Big Picture"	Alan Taylor	Alyson Feltes	1996
Gardner Ross hires a competing investment bank to handle its IPO. After a reception for potential investors, the investment bank handling the IPO claims that investors do not think Sally is experienced enough to be head of the firm. He asks her to make Adam head of the firm but she refuses. Face time with potential investors reveals that they are less receptive to Sally as head of the firm. Later, during an executive meeting, she relents and asks Adam to lead the firm. Unwilling to agree to a lock-in period due to her fragile marriage, Susannah asks Monika to return as head of research and agree to a lock-in period in her place to make the IPO more appealing to investors. Monika doesn't give her an answer because she has received an offer from a competing firm. After the competing investment bank withdraws Monika's offer, she suspects Susannah influenced the withdrawal and angrily turns down the offer from Gardner Ross but later changes her mind. Susannah decides to let her husband have custody over their daughter. Monika decides not to head the research department. Marty temporarily tries to hide currency trading losses. During a reception for potential investors, Sally learns about Marty's losses from his intoxicated wife, Barb Stephens. Cathy's lawyer gives the firm until an hour before it goes public to settle her lawsuit. Since, a pending lawsuit will have a negative impact on the IPO and both firms are implicated in her insider trades, the investment banker handling the IPO asks Jack to hire his sister back. He points out that Jack can always fire her again later. Jack visits her at her home and hires her back. After Donald dates Grant's love interest, Grant quits. Donald follows him into a tree in a park in the middle of winter to tell Grant he will not see her again and ask for Grant's forgiveness. Grant accepts. They get stuck together in a tree and have to call the fire department to get down. Meanwhile, the newly floated Gardner Ross stock has started trading and is dropping precipitously on the news that Grant has quit. Later, in an e-mail to his love interest, he encourages her to date Donald. The episode ends with Cedric and Adam walking together. Cedric tells Adam that he has bought shares of Gardner Ross and hints of plans to buy more.
13	13	"The Enemy Without"	Alan Goluboff	David Shore	1996
Cedric takes Sally by surprise by showing up for a board meeting after purchasing 10% of the firm in the IPO. Adam motions to give Cedric a seat on the board but Sally objects. The others vote and the motion fails. Sally and her father have a lunch meeting where she explains why she does not want him on the executive board. Jack asks Donald to spy on his sister Cathy. Later, while making a phone call from Cathy's desk, he notices a scheduled an appointment with another bank. While watching her, Donald sees Cathy put something from one of the firm's files into her purse and gets suspicious. After Susannah sends Cathy to the library, Donald takes her purse and finds a confidential document inside. Grant and Donald go to the address on Cathy's desk only to find a dumpster and dive in expecting to find something incriminating. When she shows up at the dumpster, they realize she has tricked them. While spying on Cathy, Donald feigns interest in a rubber company and uncovers a deal opportunity. He later approaches the owner of the rubber processing company about taking it public. In his absence, he asks Grant to watch Cathy. When he returns, Susannah gets annoyed at Donald's constant presence in her office. When Donald discusses the deal with Susannah, she thinks it's too early for an IPO. Sally meets with the 21-year-old head of a merchant bank to make a purchase offer. Susannah's due diligence uncovers several private placements that the merchant bank has that are valued at cost and not market value, making the target more valuable than their offer for it. Cedric sells his block of Gardner Ross and meets with the target merchant bank to discuss investing in them. He has no interest in merchant banking but wants to buy them so that Gardner Ross cannot. When Sally meets again with the head of the merchant bank, she discovers that her father's bid includes an off table offer for the bank. While Cedric has a lower official bid for the bank, his offer includes an untraceable cash component that will not be taxed. In order to raise money quickly, Adam and Sally approach Grant. Instead of getting into a bidding war with Cedric, the directors attempt to hire the bank's star banker. Jack goes to the merchant bank but is ignored by the key merchant banker he hopes to retain. When Jack makes the star banker an offer, he discovers that the target merchant bank already has her locked in for 5 years. Jack follows the star merchant banker to a meeting with a potential buyer to pitch one of her client's products. Much to her chagrin, Jack promises the buyer to make some product modifications that will be difficult to fulfill. In an effort to correct his earlier mistake, Jack poses as a retailer from the west coast and meets a different person at the company he pitched earlier to buy the product. While there, he discovers that the merchant banker he is pursuing did the same thing earlier. While talking after a game of squash, Adam updates Cedric on the firm's strategy. Adam tells Cedric that Grant is making enough profit to outbid him for the merchant bank but then meets with Sally and tells her that Grant is making huge losses. During his meeting with Sally, he offers to sell some of his stock in Gardner Ross and loan the money back to the firm. They each sell 1/3 of their holdings in the firm. Meanwhile, Grant is actually up about $1 million for the day. Jack and Sally later come to an agreement with the merchant bank. Gardner will get 51% of the merchant bank, the conditions will be waived, the 21-year-old gets a seat on Gardner's board, veto power and Jack cannot have anything to do with the star merchant banker's deals. Jack enters his office to find Janet Hamilton, the star merchant banker sitting at his desk with the intention of renegotiating the terms of her contract, which she finds restrictive. Although Gardner brings money to the table, it doesn't bring any deals. Donald, who is in the room realizes that the rubber processing plant might be a more appropriate deal for a merchant bank and gives it to her. When the price of Gardner drops as a result of their inflated bid for the merchant bank, Cedric starts buying Gardner. Sally orders the firm to buy Gardner stock to defend her position from her father's takeover bid. When Chris tells her that they have almost used up Grant's spectacular profits, she realizes that Adam had lied to her and had been working with her father behind her back all along. The firm quickly runs out of capital and Cedric regains a controlling stake. He fires Sally at the next board meeting. Jack quits with her.

=== Season 2 (1996–97) ===
No. overall	No. in season	Title	Directed by	Written by	Original release date
14	1	"Chaos Theory"	Kari Skogland	Hart Hanson	1996
The season opens with Jack Larkin and Sally Ross drinking together on top of a building in an industrial park with the city skyline in the background. While they are celebrating, Sally receives a call from her father, Cedric Ross, and they both travel to meet him. During their conversation, Sally tells him she won't be going back to her professorship at the university but will be looking for a new job instead. Her father tries to explain that there are circumstances that she is unaware of and it's better that she is not involved with the firm. Just after they part, Cedric's car drives by at high speed by an unknown driver. Jack, Sally and Adam Cunningham run to find Cedric lying on the street where he has been hit by a stun gun in the heart area in what appears to be a carjacking. The three of them return to the office where Arthur Kemper, the firm's lawyer, informs them that Cedric has willed his share of the firm away to Sally. Hearing this, Adam contests the lawyer's assertion stating that, before his death, Cedric had made promises to him in the lawyer's presence. Sally immediately decides to leave the board intact and makes her, Adam and Jack into an executive committee. She then promises that if the 3 of them successfully manage the firm together for a year, she will sell each of them a corresponding share in the firm making them equal partners. Donald finds Grant Jansky, the firm's derivatives trader, immobile on the bathroom floor and calls emergency. Grant returns from the hospital in good health but it is revealed that his earlier catatonic state was caused by a toxic reaction to caffeine resulting from his incessant chocolate eating. Jack is approached by a guitar maker client who has received a phone call from the Canadian Corporate Bank of Canada, a large bank, threatening to cut off its line of credit if it goes public with Gardner Ross. Cedric's personal assistant of 37 years offers to take care of his memorial arrangements for Sally. When Sally is unsure about the randomness of her father's robbery/murder, Jack asks Tommy Rykespoor, a boxer friend of his who also does private investigation to look into Cedric's carjacking and murder. When Jack introduces Sally to Tommy, she gets upset that Jack initiated an investigation without her knowledge and consent. Before leaving, Tommy tells them that while there has been a spate of carjackings, her father's does not fit the pattern. The carjackers normally go after newer, sportier vehicles and nobody has ever been killed. During a talk in a sauna with other industry leader friends and associates, Adam dispels potentially damaging rumors about Gardner Ross. While there, he also mentions threats to the guitar maker to cut off lines of credit if the guitar maker went public with Gardner to David Astin, the chairman of Cancorp. Sally later finds a key to a safety deposit box but no record of which bank or box number it is for so she hires Tommy to find out. He quickly finds out by examining her father's car service history. When they find the box empty, knowing that the box must have been in use at the time of Cedric's death, they decide to find out who last accessed it. After discovering that Cedric's personal assistant emptied the safety deposit box, Sally and Tommy confront her. The personal assistant tells Sally that she shredded the envelope she found inside. Just after they leave, the assistant calls Adam about the envelope. Knowing that Adam has the envelope, Sally offers to sell him a third of the firm at 3 times book value. Inside of the envelope, they find an illegally obtained Canadian Security Intelligence Service (CSIS) file. Tommy's examination of the CSIS file reveals that it's the investigation of a financier who they presume is Cedric. When Jack introduces Adam to an executive from a Korean bank that purchased a large stake in Gardner Ross at the IPO, Adam does not want any involvement with them because they cannot verify the bank's sources of capital but later relents and receives a blue guitar from the guitar maker client as a token of appreciation for arranging alternative financing with the Korean bank. At the request of their Korean bank shareholder and partner, the firm sends Mike Fabris to Korea to learn Korean banking practices. The episode ends with Sally's eulogy to her father.
15	2	"The Natari Affair"	Alex Chapple	Robert Sandler & Allen Booth	1996
Jack and Donald meet with a delegation representing the Prince of Natari to discuss a $500M deal. Frustrated at not having direct contact with the Prince, Jack insults the delegation during the meeting calling them carpet hagglers only to find out that the Prince was in the delegation but never spoke. During an executive meeting later, Adam informs Jack that what the Prince did is a common tactic in the Middle East. Feeling that Jack does not have the experience to close the deal successfully, Adam asks Sally to make him the lead investment banker. Still despondent about her father's death, Sally refuses to make a decision. Acting on a tip about stock churning, a securities commission investigator arrives at the firm to investigate the trading floor. While Marty is trying to shoo him away, Sally intervenes by offering the firm's trading records for the last 72 hours by the following morning. Marty is shorting the stock of a housewares company he expects to tank because he hears that they have accounting irregularities. On the day of the securities commission investigation, Cathy finds an accounting discrepancy of $5,000. Meanwhile, the stock Marty has been shorting is not going down like he expected. In order to stall the investigator from finding the discrepancy, Sally asks Marty to alert the investigator about the housewares company he's shorting. Marty refuses admitting that he got the information from an insider so Sally stalls the investigator herself. Marty asks Sally to make a call to the securities commission investigator. When she refuses, Marty disguises his voice and makes an anonymous call to the investigator from a phone booth. Later, Marty approaches Sally about her despondence. To atone for insulting the Prince, Adam suggests that they get him a falcon as a present but feeling jilted at not getting to lead the Natari deal, he goes home early to spend time with his wife. Jack tasks Donald to find a falcon. Hoping to woo new clients, Ann asks to accompany Jack to the luncheon with the Prince. When they arrive at the meeting, they are denied admittance. Ann and Jack sneak in through a back door while Donald sets up a date with the interpreter. The Prince likes a falcon lawn ornament Jack got him and, appreciating the thoughtfulness of the gift, reconsiders doing business with Gardner Ross. Later, Jack and Anne attend a dinner with the Prince of Natari pretending to be husband and wife. Hoping to land a new client, Ann is surprised to find that men and women dine separately. They both compete with a British investment bank rival couple to connect with the Natari Prince and Princess. Meanwhile, Donald is on a date with the Arabic interpreter that unexpectedly involves booze and intimacy. The following morning, they find out that Gardner has landed the deal. Donald, mistakenly thinking that he found a deal-breaker, embarrasses Gardner by querying the Natari group about it. Jack makes him take full responsibility for his mistake. Donald's mistake embarrasses the Prince who now expects better deal terms that will bring no profit to the firm. Gardner team members figure out that the missing $5,000 is a result of an over invoicing by the Prince's interpreter. When they alert the Prince, he agrees to the original terms of the deal but realizing that the interpreter's hand might be cut off as punishment for theft when she returns to Natari and expecting the Prince to pull the plug on the deal if they try to intervene with her punishment, members of the firm are divided on what course of action to take. Concerned about how their causing someone's hand to be cut off might affect the firm's image, Jack asks the Prince to consider an alternative form of punishment but the Prince refuses. Meanwhile, Donald further endangers the deal by going to the airport to rescue the thieving interpreter. Not knowing what to do, Jack personally goes to Adam's house to ask him to take over the deal. Adam successfully persuades the Prince to allow Gardner Ross to handle the deal while pressing charges against the thief in Canada. Adam returns home to find his wife has attempted to overdose on prescription sleeping pills and pleads with him to let her die.
16	3	"High Flyer Down"	Stacey Stewart Curtis	Hart Hanson	1996
When a shady stock promoter that Jack knows shows up at the firm, Jack immediately calls security but when the promoter reminds Jack of a favor he owes, Jack decides to hear him out. He pitches Jack on a hemp company. Jack has several members of the firm examine the company and they all get excited about it but, knowing the history of the stock promoter, Jack remains skeptical so he hires Tommy to investigate the promoter. Tommy only finds out that the promoter has been using the Internet to promote bogus stocks lately and owes money to a loan shark. The stock promoter later damages Sally's car and when she enters the parking lot, befriends her and convinces her to have the executive committee listen to his hemp company promotion. Still skeptical of the stock promoter, Jack asks Ann to research hemp stocks on the Internet to find anything suspicious. They discover that the promoter is promoting hemp stocks on the Internet and figure out that the promoter wants a reputable firm like Gardner to announce its support for the company, thereby increasing stock prices so he can make a fortune selling his stock while opening up Gardner to lawsuits. Jack buys the entire issue on his personal account. When the stock promoter meets with the Gardner executive committee, he learns that Jack has bought the company and forced him to sign an unpalatable contract or be charged with stock fraud. He reluctantly signs. Grant invites other members of the firm to watch a new derivatives trading program he has created but nobody is interested. When only Donald shows up to see it, Grant allows him to try out the program for himself. Donald gets immersed in Grant's video game like trading device but soon breaks it. Jack's sister starts work in the cage. A microfiche explosion and a brownout cause the firm to lose record of all trades—around $10M—for that day. When Adam finds out, he threatens to fire someone unless a viable solution is found. At a board meeting, Cathy is about to get fired when she finds a way to bluff the bank into getting back securities deposited by Gardner the previous day so the firm can account for them. A financial TV show wants to interview Sally. She is initially hesitant until the host tells her that the topic is Cuba, a subject she is interested in. Sally later appears on a TV financial program to defend Canada's interest in Cuba. Jack's nephew is facing expulsion from school if he gets into any more trouble. Cathy asks Jack to take her nephew to a school dance. Before they go to the dance, Jack takes him to Tommy's boxing class that he has agreed to coach in Tommy's absence. His nephew shows promise and asks Tommy to join the boxing club. Tommy agrees to let him join on the condition that he not drink, smoke, do drugs or fight outside the ring. At the dance, Jack's nephew is accused of drawing graffiti on a wall. The principal plans to expel his nephew but Jack intervenes by telling her that, as a rule of the boxing club, he will have to maintain a C average and won't be able to fight outside of the ring. She decides not to expel him. Contrary to Jack's encouragement, Cathy disallows her son from boxing.
17	4	"Trudy Kelly"	Kari Skogland	Raymond Storey	1996
After seeing Sally on TV, a popular TV personality named Trudy Kelly who has been having trouble renegotiating her contract over image control issues and profit distribution approaches the firm wanting to buy her employer out. Sally agrees to act as the lead in the Trudy Kelly deal with Jack's assistance. Sally wants to try a diplomatic solution using a buy out as a last resort for Trudy's contract dispute but Trudy is uncompromising leans toward a more hostile approach. Unable to contact the head of the media conglomerate that holds Trudy's contract since he won't return her calls, Sally discovers that he is golfing and when she learns that Donald belongs to the same country club, she gets him to take her there to meet the executive. When Sally tells the media executive that she's shopping Trudy to other networks, he refers her to a section of Trudy's contract. When they check her contract, they realize that the media conglomerate owns the name and image of Trudy Kelly and cannot therefore shop her around to other potentially interested media companies. Jack's research into Trudy Kelly's operations reveal that her spendthrift ways have made her magazine unprofitable. During lunch with Sally, Ann tells her that she agrees with Jack's view of Trudy being a free spender. In light of Trudy's contract details and her spendthrift ways, Sally does not think she has what it takes to run a business and recommends that they negotiate for a percentage of the profits for Trudy instead of a buy out. When Sally meets with the communications company executives, Trudy is a no show but instead announces on her show that she will launch a management buy out of her name and image from the media conglomerate. When the Gardner executive committee meets with Trudy later, Sally outlines the sacrifices she will have to make to buy out the media company and informs her that, since Gardner will be putting their own capital on the line, someone from Gardner will be assigned to control her spending. Trudy agrees to the terms. Trudy, Gardner's bankers and the media company's executives meet to negotiate the buyout. The media company rejects their first offer. They resubmit a bid that does not include book publishing that is also rejected. Gardner finally makes an offer requiring her to give up some valuable properties she has the use of but the media executives reject the bid. When Sally asks Jack for advice, he suggests that the media company might not be willing to let go of Trudy. Finally, they offer international distribution rights to the media conglomerate with Trudy Kelly only holding English language distribution rights. The media executive accepts the deal. After the disastrous loss of a day's trading records the previous week, the firm's board members vote for Cathy to work on Marty's trading floor to improve communication between the floor and the cage. She immediately hits if off with Benny but distracted by her, Benny incorrectly enters a trade, potentially costing the firm $500,000. Feeling partially responsible, Cathy convinces him to let her help him cover it up and she uses her access to the cage to do so. The trade that Benny entered incorrectly becomes profitable but Marty knows about their cover up. He warns Cathy and Benny never to try to hide their losses again. Adams wife decides to end her life with a prescription medication overdose again. Adam reluctantly assists her. The episode ends with a shot from Adam's wife's funeral procession.
18	5	"Separation Anxiety"	Alex Chapple	Alyson Feltes	1996
In the lobby of the building, a Quebec First Nations group is holding what looks like a protest in front of the media. When Marty calls security to have them removed, Jack tries to stop him because the group are clients of Gardner Ross. A bank in Quebec had agreed to loan the First Nations reserve money to build a casino but when First Nations voted not to separate from the remainder of Canada in a referendum, the bank changed its mind and the province revoked their casino license. The reserve approaches Gardner for the money to build the casino even though they do not have an operating license. Jack thinks the province will change its mind once a casino building has been erected. First Nations is currently fighting with the province in court over the casino license. Since First Nations reserves are self-governed, Jack gives them the same advice as he would for a small sovereign country. He advises the reserve to issue bonds on the international market to raise the capital they need even though they expect that doing so will raise the ire of the Quebec government. Out of fear that by doing so, the First Nations reserve will move a step closer to becoming a sovereign nation, they expect the Quebec government to reissue the casino license and the Quebec bank to reissue the loan. In financial terms, a government is sovereign only when it can collect taxes from its citizens but in international law, the First Nations reserve is as sovereign as it was before the Europeans invaded Canada. Jack, Susannah and Donald convince a bond rating agency to publish a rating for their First Nations client, thereby paving the way for a bond issue as long as they can get the First Nations reserve to commit to allow mining on their land and get a mining company to commit to development. Adam takes time away from the office to look after his deceased wife's affairs. Marty's brother-in-law has lost money on a stock scam and the rest of his in-laws pressure him to do something about it. Marty hires Tommy to find the boiler room (business) that sold the bogus stock to his brother-in-law. After Tommy finds the location, Marty unsuccessfully tries to prepare Tommy to go in undercover so they can catch the owner/operator and have him arrested. Because he does not understand the shady world of stock promotion well enough, Tommy is ill-equipped to go undercover so Marty decides to do it himself. Marty goes to the boiler room and is quickly hired. Marty excels so much at the penny stock promotion swindle that he gets a bonus for being the top swindler of the day and is invited to meet the boss at a strip club later that evening. When Marty meets with the boiler room boss at a strip club later, he receives a further payment in cash and discovers that the man who hired him is actually the boss. He plans to expand and wants Marty to train new swindlers in exchange for 40% of the profits. Jack finds Marty at the boiler room. When the boiler room operator sees Jack, he assumes Jack is a loan shark and offers to pay Marty's debt. Later on, the police raid the boiler room and arrest all of the sales staff. Benny and his wife separate after 22 years of marriage. Cathy invites Benny over for dinner. The Gerald Graykirk of Graykirk Mining agrees to mine the First Nations' mineral resources if Gardner can get the reserve to agree to a binding contract. Gardner sends out a trial balloon in the form of a draft Green Sheet (Investment Term) to see how the market might react to a sovereign debt issue from a First Nations reserve. Ann finds a European client willing to buy half of the offer. After some Quebec clients decide to close their accounts with Gardner Ross as a result of the firm's attempt to float the First Nations bond issue as sovereign debt, Sally and Adam question Jack's decision to involve the firm with the issue. Jack defends his decision, pointing out that it's a business decision and not a political one. When Adam later speaks with one of his fellow private club members who has strong ties to the Prime Minister's office, it is implied that the national government views the designation of the First Nations bond issue as sovereign as separatist. During an executive committee meeting later on, Adam sides with Jack on the issue. Both expect the Quebec government to reconsider the casino license. Even though the firm is losing clients, Adam also wants to see the issue through to the end. When the executive committee meets with the First Nations leaders later, the Quebec government has reissued the casino license and the Quebec bank has reissued the loan guarantee with lower interest rates and better terms. Even though Gardner will receive a generous commission for its services, Jack still hopes the reserve will continue with the bond issue since it would give them far more capital than the loan but the reserve leaders prefer the loan only since it is more certain. It is implied later that Adam influenced the outcome and will receive something in return for it. He is also offered dinner with the Prime Minister.
19	6	"Spin"	Stacey Stewart Curtis	John Krizanc	1996
The firm discovers that they have missed a $2M payment on something called a Cartesian bond that Cedric sold. They think it's a clerical error but, if it's not, the firm will be liable for $32M. The Cartesian bond's first payment was made by Cedric according to the large fund that holds the bond but Gardner has no record of the payment being made. The second $2M payment is now due but, with Cedric gone, nobody at the firm knows anything about it. Since the bond has no credit rating, they suspect it's a bogus issue. When Sally goes to the address on the bond issue to investigate, she finds an empty lot in an industrial area. Since the compliance department has to report anything shady to the commission and fearing that her father might have made a bogus issue, Sally hires Tommy to investigate the Cartesian bond. Tommy's investigation uncovers the local phone number of an answering service. He also finds out that the output of stun gun used to kill Cedric was doubled making it more likely that it was actually a murder and not a carjacking but the police were ordered to put the case on a back burner by a higher authority. When Sally and Tommy go the answering service that answers the telephone number on the Cartesian bond, they find out that Cedric initiated service with them in person. Jack and Tommy find the teenager who doubled the output of the stun gun that killed Sally's father to try to squeeze information from him. He doesn't divulge any information but gets nervous when Tommy mentions Cedric. The executive committee learns that the firm is not liable for the Cartesian bond payments but that Sally is personally liable through an offshore tax shelter her father set up in her name the day she was born. A senator who is also Sally's godfather gives her the $2M payment she is liable for and then explains the details of the Cartesian bond. The senator approached Cedric for help creating an unorthodox but not fraudulent investment vehicle on the behalf of the Canadian Security Intelligence service (CSIS). The $30M was seed money to cover a covert CSIS investment fund. The reason why CSIS had a case file on Cedric because he was overseeing hundreds of millions of dollars of their money. The senator asks Sally to act as a front for the fund as her father did. If she refuses, they will give her the money to pay back the bond. She doesn't commit. Jack and Tommy tell Sally that they think they've found the kid who killed her father. When she wants to know why they haven't turned him in to the police, they tell her that the police have been told by their superiors to back off the murder investigation. They then ask Adam to ask one of his contacts at CSIS why the investigation is being held back. Adam asks a high-level CSIS contact about Cedric's involvement in the fund and offers to manage the fund himself if Sally refuses. He also suggests that the firm might make the existence of the fund public. The CSIS official shrugs off the publicity threat leading them to believe that they have nothing to hide. The teenager who killed Cedric had worked for the senator leading them to suspect that the Sally's godfather might have ordered her father's murder. They later confirm that the senator knew about Cedric's heart condition and ordered the teenager to use the overpowered stun gun on Sally's father. The teenager agrees to turn himself in and testify against the senator. Susannah warns Marty that a stock he's been shorting is unlikely to fall any further and, if the company wins a patent it applied for, the price will skyrocket, thereby opening Marty's short position to unlimited losses. Later, Jack and Adam meet with Marty because, to the detriment of the firm, he frequently does not take Susannah's advice. Thinking that they will need to make the $2M payment to avoid a securities commission investigation, Sally pressures Marty to have $2M in cash at the end of the day. If he sells from the firm's inventory, he will be selling at the bottom of the market. In an effort to help Marty, Cathy introduces him to self-hypnosis that uses a pendant as a way to make decisions. Marty tests the self-hypnosis technique by asking whether to buy an under performing stock. When the pendant indicates he should buy, he disregards the technique. Marty starts to change his mind about Cathy's self-hypnosis technique when the stock that the pendant indicated he should buy rises dramatically. He soon buys the pendant from Cathy and starts using it to make trading decisions. Later, when Susannah gets concerned about a large position in a cable company he has built, he ignores her and the other traders in favor of his pendant. The stock price of the cable company tanks causing Marty $1.26M in losses at the market close after one of Ann's clients sells 500,000 shares. A foreman from a pulp mill that Donald worked at as a teenager shows up at the firm to ask Donald for help refinancing after the government has decided to foreclose on it. Although Donald is perfectly suited to lead the deal, the mill manager thinks of him as a teenager and would not be comfortable with him acting as lead banker. When Donald suggest to his former foreman that he should be the one to handle the debt issue, as expected, the foreman rejects him and asks for someone older so Donald introduces him to Adam. On Donald's recommendation, the pulp mill foreman engages Adam but the two of them are not in agreement on how to raise capital. Adam thinks an equity issue would be better than a debt issue, partially because the debt issue would earn Gardner 3.5% as opposed to 6% of the equity issue. During Adam's meeting with the mill foremen, Donald undermines him by presenting his preferred way of financing so Adam dismisses him. Donald is about to quit when he learns from Susannah that the pulp mill will receive logging rights to a prime timber stand. Donald's father knows that and if they go with an equity issue, they will effectively give the pulp mill to Donald's father for far less than it's worth. This makes Donald's original plan the better course of action.
20	7	"Home Office"	Alan Goluboff	David Cole	1997
At Tommy's gym, Sally meets a nun named Connie who also coaches boxing. Tommy also gives Sally a tape of a nature and choir mash-up made by Connie hoping that she can help Connie with the business end of things. The manufacturer of the tapes cannot prevent a hissing sound and hopes that Sally might be able to help with a defect common to all tapes. Sally meets with the owner of the recording company that manufactures Connie's tapes. Sally suggests that his tapes are cheap and they hiss and he agrees. If he could sell more, he could get better tapes but he won't sell more unless he gets better tapes, putting him in a catch 22 situation. Sally learns that he makes no profit from making the tapes. Knowing that he has contacts at a record company, Sally asks Jack, who is Catholic, for help with Connie's tapes. Later, both Connie and the manufacturer appear in Sally's office overjoyed with a $25,000 offer they have received from another record company. When they received the offer, the manufacturer exercised a shotgun clause to buy out Connie for $10,000 expecting to net $15,000 when the record company buys him out. Sally is dismayed that they accepted a first offer and advises Connie to buy the manufacturer out instead. She then advises Connie to counter the record company by asking $250,000. Jack, Ann and Sally buy out the tape manufacturer for $30,000 hoping to negotiate a better purchase price from the record company. Under this arrangement, instead of receiving the $10,000 she needs, Connie will owe Sally and the others $10,000. A lawyer for the church informs Sally, Jack and Ann that they are actually in partnership with the church and not Connie herself. The church decides not to sell out to the larger record company but to market the tapes itself. Since doing so will not be profitable for at least a year, Connie will not have the money for some charity work she wants to do. Feeling responsible, Sally donates $10,000 so the nun can do her work. The firm hires Tommy to track down a millionaire prospect. Jack and Sally suggest that Adam approach the millionaire but he refuses saying that he saw the prospect shoot a duck in the water. They decide Marty should make the approach. Marty is reluctant until he finds out the prospect is worth $300M, has just closed his accounts at a competing bank and landing him as a client can greatly expand his trading capital. Since the prospect and Adam have a history, Marty cannot approach him directly. They have to make it look like an accidental meeting. Tommy quickly finds out that the client will be in a box at a baseball game that night. Gardner Ross arranges for Marty to meet the $300M prospect in a private box at the baseball game by somehow double-booking the box. While Marty and his wife are sharing the box with the $300M prospective client, his attempts to connect with the prospect are disrupted by his wife. The firm then decides to arrange a dinner meeting between the prospect with Marty and Susannah. Since the two of them are often at odds with one another, they are both reluctant to the dinner meeting together. Marty is also uncomfortable not being accompanied by his wife. When the prospect is very late, they have dinner together, smooth over their differences and actually enjoy each other's company. Just as Susannah leaves, the prospect and Marty's wife show up. The prospect had forgotten where they were supposed to meet but met Marty's wife by accident and the two of them had been walking through the theater district together to find the restaurant. Marty's wife gets suspicious at signs that Marty did not dine alone. Later on, when the $300M prospect insults his wife Barb, Marty gets angry and rudely asks him to leave the firm. Cathy's work is suffering as a result of domestic problems with her son. Cathy's son admits that the chocolates he has been selling have been stolen. Cathy agrees to pay for them and then slaps him in front of the trading floor after finding out he has lied about the theft. To retaliate, her son injures himself and then lies to social services by telling them Cathy abuses him.
21	8	"Top of the Tombstone"	Henry Sarwer-Foner	Maureen McKeon	1997
Jack's nephew tells a judge that he would prefer to live with his uncle but the judge leaves it up to Jack, Cathy and Cathy's son Sean to decide together where he will live. At a subsequent meeting, Cathy requests that the judge order Sean to stay with her. To help her case, she lies to the judge telling her that her son was in a bar the night before and Ann gave him alcohol to drink. When Jack tells Sean that it's time to return home, his nephew storms off. The next day when they find out he did not stay with either Cathy or Jack the previous and did not attend a counseling session, Jack, Ann, Cathy and Benny leave work to search the streets for him. Benny finds him and convinces him to return home. When a billionaire client announces that he needs to raise $1B to build a harbor in Jakarta, even though Gardner is not large enough to take on the deal, Jack asks him who will lead the project. Sally and Adam expect a large bank to lead a consortium but give Gardner a small piece of the action. Adam meets with the Canadian Corporate Bank of Canada's (CANCORP.) David Astin and uses the opportunity to imply that Gardner's past work helping the billionaire develop the project gives them unique insights into the project. David promises Adam a small role for Gardner if chosen to lead the issue. Sally then tasks Susannah and Donald with finding unique insights into the project. Behind the backs of the others, Jack visits the billionaire client at his boat to pitch a plan that might save him $100M. If he buys a construction company large enough to handle the harbor project for $400M, $100M of the construction costs would go back into his pocket. When Jack tells him that Gardner wants to lead the financing, he replies that Gardner does not have the capital or international reputation to lead on a deal of that size and scope. Even though his idea has been rejected, the billionaire keeps the written proposal. The billionaire later decides to buy the construction company as per Jack's recommendation but requires that the purchase price be within his current financial structure and that the commission be 0.75%. Jack negotiates first consideration on the larger harbor project if they can arrange financing for the acquisition. If Gardner is unable to do the deal, the billionaire states that Gardner will definitely not lead the $1B harbor project deal. Before Adam is to meet David Astin, he asks what ideas Jack and Sally have come up with. Sally gives him a proposal for managing the billionaire's foreign exchange exposure. When he asks Jack for information on the construction company proposal, Jack reveals that he has been talking to the billionaire prospect behind their backs. Sally and Adam are alarmed by his move because it makes them look untrustworthy to the other investment banks. They fear that if the other banks find out, Gardner will receive very little of the deal if they are not chosen to lead. When Jack returns to the billionaire client to report that Gardner is only able to raise a half of the required money, he learns that the client took his idea to CANCORP. but they were not able to do any better. Jack suggests that he take his shipping line public to raise capital but as expected, the billionaire angrily rejects the idea. Not only has he lost the deal but the larger banks now know that Gardner has gone behind their backs, potentially angering them. When he returns to the office, Jack proposes that Gardner Ross invest since the client wants to sell the financing side of his business. Doing so would make Gardner too cash strapped to join the consortium. Adam tells him that Gardner is not his firm to put at risk but he counters that it is as much his firm as it is Adams. When he hears that Sally secretly sold Adam a share in the firm equal to her own, Jack gets angry and leaves the meeting. In an effort to control the damage done and salvage some part of the deal, Adam calls David Astin. David considers Jack's actions a major breach of trust and threatens to shut Gardner out of the consortium. The trading floor starts a charity trade off with CANCORP. After Gardner loses the trade off, Marty calls his counterpart to ask for a recount. After negotiating, they agree on a draw but the two of them will go head-to-head on a long-distance run. It is only then that Marty learns that his counterpart is an avid marathoner. He tries to persuade Chris to dress up in a costume and run for him but Chris refuses. Still looking for a way to beat his competitor, Marty tries to convince Donald to disguise himself as him and run the race but Donald refuses, pointing out that Marty's counterpart is a much better runner. Marty runs the race but cheats by taking the subway to make the top twenty finishers. Seeing this, Grant is incensed at Marty's cheating. After he tells Sally about it, their conversation drifts to his new program and shows her how they can use it to manage the billionaire client's currency risk giving them a new idea to pitch to him. Sally pitches the billionaire client with a new plan. They can turn the client's ships into a public company and then swap its stock for a controlling interest in the construction company that they are unable to raise $400M for. The construction company will wind up owning the shipping company but the billionaire will have a controlling interest in the construction company. As a new company in Indonesia, the deal will also enable him to gain venture capital benefits from the Indonesian government. After the Jakarta harbor project has been completed, he will be able to buy his ships back. She arranges for him to meet Grant face-to-face so that Grant can explain the workings of the program to him. The billionaire is so impressed that he gives Gardner the billion dollar deal and hires Grant. Soon after, Jack demands his share of the firm from Sally. He is willing to pay 3 times the book value of the firm just like Adam did. Adam meets with David Astin who demands that his bank get at least 50% of the $1B deal but Adam refuses to commit. Grant uses the investment histories of Ann's clients to test a program that can predict what their next investment will be.
22	9	"Family Legacy"	Alan Goluboff	Raymond Storey	1997
Adam meets with a childhood friend named Clifford who heads a family business. He asks Adam to be the first non-family member to join the company board of directors. While Clifford was suffering from an illness, his sister wrestled control of the company from him. He has won a lawsuit to take back control of the company on the condition that the board have an objective voice which is why he wants Adam to join the board. Jack is uninterested in using the firm's capital to back Adam's seat on the board of Clifford's company and Sally is not comfortable with how much capital it will require but Adam prefers the board seat to leading the $1B deal. He wants Gardner to buy 5% of Clifford's company which, according to the analysts, will cost the firm approximately $60M. Sally doesn't think Gardner can afford more than a 2% stake. Clifford shows up at Gardner and tells Adam that the family is looking forward to him joining the board. Later, Clifford's sister tells Adam that she will oppose him becoming a board member but, after a discussion where he states his intentions for the family company, she becomes more amenable. Susannah approaches Marty with an idea to short a gold company stock because she expects the price of gold, which is at an all-time low, to fall further due to anticipated selling by two European central banks. He is totally bullish on gold and rejects her idea outright. Near the end of the trading day, the price of gold drops, thereby hurting Marty's long position in the gold mining stock that Susannah recommended that he short. That evening, the other traders get down on Marty for not listening to Susannah's recommendation. Marty tries to patch things up with her while she is watching a TV trivia game show to which she knows all of the answers to. The other traders ridicule Marty for not having any trading ideas. When he looks through the newspaper for ideas, he finds an advertisement to enter Quiz Whiz, the TV game show Susannah knew all of the answers to the previous night and tries mend bridges by getting her on the show. He even asks Sally who is friends with the producer of the show to get Susannah on but she refuses to pull any strings. He later pretends to call the producer of Quiz Whiz on Sally's behalf to get Susannah on the show. In return for the favor, Marty commits Sally to being a guest host on one of his other shows. While Marty is trying to get Susannah prepared for Quiz Whiz, she admits that her call on the gold mining company was actually a tip from an old roommate and did not come from any analysis. Susannah enters the game show. After she leaves, Marty collects money from the other traders who were probably betting against the two of them reconciling. Although Gardner has landed the $1B deal, due to their comparatively limited capital, they face an uphill battle making it profitable unless they increase their share of the deal. A new CANCORP. VP named Victor Kennilworth tries to exploit Gardner's limited cash availability and make a name for himself by demanding a larger share of the deal than the other two participating banks. Gardner cannot do the deal without him. Jack wants to increase Gardner's stake in the deal but Sally is unwilling to put the firm at risk. Jack suggests asking their large South Korean shareholder to participate as a backup even though non-Canadian financiers cannot participate in the deal. Their discussion is interrupted by Victor, the new VP at the larger competing bank, who invites Jack out to play basketball. After basketball, Victor tells him that he intends to scoop the $1B deal but offers him $100M of it after he does. Jack turns down the offer. Jack learns that their South Korean backer decided to pull out of the Jakarta harbor project. Knowing that Adam is responsible, he confronts Adam over it and threatens to sue him, possibly jeopardizing Adam's ability to join Clifford's board. Jack tells him that when he gets on the board, he must steer the company toward a large investment in the Jakarta harbor project to make up for the loss of the South Korean backer. Since Clifford's company makes dredgers and the Jakarta harbor project needs them, the two firms are related. When Jack and Adam pitch the idea to Clifford, he angrily rejects it and withdraws Adam's board membership offer. Clifford refers to Adam as "scholarship boy" and later Adam tells Jack that his father's business collapsed while he was attending school. Not being able to afford a prestigious private school anymore, Adam's mother got the headmaster to accept him on scholarship. Before Clifford called him "scholarship boy", Adam thought it was a secret. Grant confides in Ann telling her that he misses Gardner Ross. Jack later asks the billionaire client for Grant to return to Gardner and he allows Grant to return. Donald's mother leaves his father and turns to him for support. Knowing of Donald's mother's situation, Sally suggests getting financial advice from a professional for her. Donald gets Ann to help her but his mother is too distraught. Donald meets with his father and arranges a meeting between the three of them the following day. When they meet, Donald's mother intimates that she is more interested in Donald and his father reconciling than in leaving him. Tommy has to attend an event and needs a date because he knows a former girlfriend of his will be there. Sally volunteers but he doesn't take her seriously but when Tommy picks Sally up for the event, she is dressed in a revealing outfit. They become intimate. The billionaire client and Clifford's sister meet at Gardner. The client is open to their proposal but does not commit. After the meeting, Clifford's sister supports Adam's election to the board of her family-owned company. Later on, in a meeting with the Adam, Clifford and his sister, after they all come to agree on the direction of the company, offer Adam 1% of the company, a $12M value. When Victor shows up at Gardner, Jack offers him 9.5% of the deal and not the 10% CANCORP. was pushing for. Victor thinks that Gardner Ross cannot do such a large deal without them until Jack informs him that Clifford's family-owned firm will be participating. Later, Victor sees that Gardner can do the deal without CANCORP.'s participation, he agrees to join on Gardner's terms.
23	10	"Emeritus No More"	Gordon Langevin	Alyson Feltes	1997
The episode begins with Adam, Sally and Jack being interviewed on a financial TV show. Adam walks off the show after the host falsely suggests that he owns a hobby farm and has political aspirations. Marty, who is watching the show from the trading floor, gets mad when the host mentions a $65M draw down required on the following day. Jack and Sally tell Marty they need $65M in escrow by the end of the day but Marty has been suffering losses recently. When Grant sees him on the trading floor at an unusually early hour, Marty tells him that he is at 40% of his maximum allowable draw down and will need over $90M to get to profitability. Grant offers to help. After squash, a friend who owns a sport management company tells Adam that a larger sport management firm has offered to buy him out. Having heard negative things about the acquiring sport management company, Jack advises Adam not to proceed with the acquisition. Donald and Adam explain to the sport management company owner that the acquiring company is in a financial position that requires it to continually buy other companies or falter. After Adam explains that the acquiring company will try to acquire his company by hostile means if rebuffed, they decide to enact defensive measures. Soon after, the acquiring sport management company turns hostile. Adam and Donald explain the poison pill as a way to make the purchase of his company too expensive to the acquiring company. The also consider using Gardner Ross's capital to buy out the acquiring company since it has a weak financial position. The client learns that his athletes want his company to be bought by the larger firm. Adam finds a way to take over the acquiring sports management company without using Gardner's money. Instead they approach the large shareholders of the acquiring firm and propose a merger with their client ultimately being appointed to manage. If they can get the acquiring firm's super agent to go along with the deal, the shareholders are likely to approve the merger. Adam and Donald approach the super agent with the proposal. He considers it but with him as the manager of the new entity and not their client. Adam decides to go ahead with the deal without telling his client but ensures that the client is well compensated. When Adam and Donald meet with their sports management client later, Adam does not admit that he agreed to go along with the super agent's demands that his client not be made manager. An environmental company releases a report asserting that the Jakarta harbor project will have a negative impact on the environment causing an environmentally friendly mutual fund that has subscribed to $100M of the offering concern over the report forcing Gardner to pay attention to acknowledge the report. Later, a marine biologist debunks claims in the environmental report and Gardner learns that a large bank rival commissioned the report. Even though the environmental mutual fund company has seen both the report that claims environmental damage from the Jakarta harbor project and the report refuting those claims, they are not willing to risk their reputation by holding a stock in a company that might be environmentally damaging and pull out of the deal as a result. Jack and Sally try to speak with Victor over the phone but he refuses to speak with them directly, instead talking through his assistant. His assistant tells them that the large bank will be willing to take up 9.5% of the shortfall, which would force Gardner to raise the rest of the $100M shortfall within a day. They offer to allow him to take the full share of the deal that the environmental company dropped. When Victor responds by saying that it would be happy to take over the deal, Jack angrily hangs up. He then goes directly to the trading floor and confronts Marty before Ann pulls him away. Doubting Chris's loyalty, Marty confronts him. At market close, Jack and Sally ask Marty for the floor's position. In order to stay within the governing body's capital regulations, the trading floor will need $12M from corporate finance. When Marty threatens to quit, Sally calls him on it. Later, the executive committee agrees that Marty is most responsible for the firm being unable to meet its capital obligations. The firm is likely to miss its drawdown date the following day. Adam leaves the meeting after Sally suggests his role there is as a figurehead. The firm cannot raise the shortfall by borrowing from any of its regular banks because all of them are in on the Jakarta harbor deal. They are forced to ask the large Korean bank that owns 8% of Gardner. Doing so saves the firm from having to default on the deal but will also make the deal profitless. Sally admits to Jack that she leaked the draw down date. Her intention was not to harm the deal but, thinking the deal was in the bag, it was to brag to the other banks about Gardner's enhanced capability to handle large deals. Near the end of the episode, Marty storms into Sally's office and refuses to resign. She responds by admitting that she leaked the draw down and expresses her belief that he used the leak as an excuse for his poor trading performance. In the end, the executive committee decide to cover the shortfall with money from the Korean bank at a loss of their independence. Chris leaves for a position as head trader at another firm. Before he does, he admits that he leaked the false information about Adam's hobby farm and political aspirations.
24	11	"The Hands Off Approach"	Keith Ross Leckie	Maureen McKeon	1997
Adam, Jack and Sally attend the opening ceremony for a retailer that they have provided a $10M bridge loan for. Jack and Adam express concern over Sally's chumminess with the client and soon learn from a potential investor the client is a former drug dealer. Sally announces that a $30M private placement for her retailer client is oversubscribed. Later, a designer who worked for Sally's retailer client shows up at the firm drunk and demanding $500,000 for work she allegedly performed but was not compensated for. During a meeting with Sally, her retailer client claims that he had offered the drunk designer a job to help turn her life around but the work she did was so poor that he could not accept any of it. He then goes on to pitch Sally on a property he wants to buy in Montreal despite having previously told his investors that the firm planned to consolidate over the next year and not expand, effectively misrepresenting himself to his investors. Sally later goes to the grand opening of the store to find it locked. When she meets with her retail client later, he claims that the fire marshal refused to allow the store to open. He also tells her that, despite her warnings, he has made an offer on the Montreal property. As a result, he will not be able to make a $1M payment the following day. Sally tasks Tommy with investigating her retail client's activities in Montreal. She then asks Ann if he is still involved in drugs. Later, she learns that there was no spot check by the fire marshal. When she tries to call the retailer, she learns that he is in Montreal. When he does not make the bridge loan installment, Adam and Jack immediately vote to sell it to a vulture fund. Following that course of action would likely get them 50% of their money but Sally later decides to force the client into receivership hoping to get more and gain satisfaction. Adam suggests she decide what to do after informing the other investors and gaging their sentiment on the scenario. Tommy learns that Sally's client is buying the building in Montreal as a favor to an old friend and drug dealing partner who contracted AIDS in prison after getting busted for drug dealing. Ann tells Sally that she is sure that the retail client is not involved in the drug trade because he got her out. Later, when they speak with an investor representing the other investors, they learn that the other private placement investors are supportive of the deal. The executive committee reconsiders killing the deal. When she sees him later, Tommy tells her that he has learned that the retailer stopped dealing drugs when his now AIDS suffering partner got busted. When Sally confronts her client, he hands her a check for a half of what is owed. She responds by telling him he good at retail but bad at business and informs him that she will place his company into receivership unless he gives up a half of the company for the $10M he owes the firm. Gardner's role will be to hire a CEO and approve all financing. After Sally agrees to let him purchase the Montreal property to help his friend, he agrees to her terms. The trading floor's losing streak continues. Donald, who has been assigned to liaise with the South Korean bank, announces to the executive committee that the bank wants Marty fired after a multi-week slump. Jack and Adam do not want to fire Marty but know the Korean bank will demand a seat on the board if they ignore the dismissal request. Later, a headhunter who specializes in placing traders shows up at Gardner Ross. In fear of losing his job, Marty resorts to technical analysis for trading ideas but the next day, Marty breaks his losing streak as a result of Susannah's recommendations. Happy with the previous day's profits that came from Susannah's recommendations, Marty convinces her to stay on the trading floor so she's more available for consultation. The traders immediately overwhelm Susannah by consulting her on every decision they make. Accustomed to making trading calls only after extensive research, Susannah quickly gets flustered by the traders who expect instant answers. Marty starts to hear a voice inside of his head that tells him what to trade again. To her embarrassment, a picture of Sally and Tommy displaying affection for each other publicly gets published in the gossip column of a local newspaper. Tommy and Sally argue over her discomfort with their public displays of affection. Jack learns that Ann had a relationship history with Sally's retailer client. At the end of the episode, Jack and Ann end their relationship. After the headhunter suggests that he should be part of the trading floor, Grant asks Marty who is in charge of him. Marty sends him to Adam. Grant incessantly updates Adam on his current profit/loss until Adam, tired of the constant interruptions, makes Marty his boss. When Grant tells Marty, he immediately confronts Adam over the apparent plans to replace him as head trader. The headhunter hires a new superstitious currency trader named Hans on a trial basis to replace Chris. Realizing that the firm was not head hunting a replacement for him, he thanks Adam.
25	12	"Middle Ground"	Giles Walker	Raymond Storey	1997
The episode begins with a pitch by a friend of Adam's in the business of selling old refinery equipment to Third World countries. A package of gift flowers arrives for Sally. When they open it, there is a pipe bomb inside that starts to smoke so the staff is evacuated. They continue their work in a bar downstairs until they can return to the office. The executive of the refinery equipment company blames an environmental group that Donald belongs to for the bomb scare. The leader of the environmental group soon arrives at the firm to deny responsibility for the bomb scare but tries to persuade the executive committee not to get involved with the used refinery equipment company. When rebuffed, he threatens to hurt the firm through legal means. The executive committee decide that Jack and Donald should go to the Honduras to verify the claims made by the environmental group. As they are preparing to travel, Adam's friend rushes in with the news that overseas insurers are pulling out and a government agency is reviewing grants and aid received. Adam suggests his friend go to Honduras with Jack and Donald. He also decides to be interviewed by a reporter about the bomb threat. During the interview, he discredits the environmental group. Adam's friend, Jack and Donald fly to the Honduras together to inspect a plant that has been reassembled there from an old Canadian plant. When Jack tells Donald to lighten up on his inspection, Donald points out that although Adam's friend claims the plant employs 280 workers, they have only seen about 20 people there that day and has concluded that their tour is really staged and does not reflect the reality of day-to-day plant operations. Donald discovers that the plant is releasing a highly toxic gas into the atmosphere. In Canada, with its wide open spaces, there is no effect but in the Honduras, it poisons the local population. Marty tells Cathy he is not comfortable with her and Benny's relationship. After Grant leaves his office, someone hacks into the Gardner Ross computer network. Grant notices the company's computers have been hacked the following morning. The leader of the environmental group shows up at Gardner's offices with many of the firm's shareholders who also belong to his environmental group. He gained access to Gardner's shareholder list by buying one share of the firm. Along with his group, a man with a laptop and a backpack holding something else sneaks into the office unnoticed. He hacks into the phone system causing chaos on the trading floor. Soon after, the trading floor's computers are shut down followed by the power forcing the traders have to evacuate to an emergency floor. The leader of the environmental group tells Sally and Adam that his group is not responsible. When Cathy goes to Grant's office she encounters a man who confines her to the room and activates a bomb. Leo, the suicide bomber then takes her to the office where Adam and Sally are located. He forces Adam to call the police to tell them of the bomb and advise them to clear the building. When the phone rings, Leo ignores it. Agitated by Adam, Leo forces him to his knees and handcuffs him to his desk. When the phone rings again, Sally answers it and hands it to Leo, telling him the police are on the other end. Leo immediately hangs up the phone. When Cathy starts crying, out of sympathy, Leo allows her to call her son. When she picks up the phone, the police are on the line. She responds to their questions by pretending to talk to her son. From a bar where most of Gardner's staff are, Grant tries to get all the information he can by hacking into Leo's home computer. Grant finds that although Leo follows the environmental group closely, he is not a member. Jack asks Grant to hack into Adam's office computer. Adam begins to write a cashier's check hoping that money will persuade Leo to leave but it only agitates him further. Leo then activates a device that will cause the bomb to detonate if he is killed. At that point, Adam, considering that Cathy is the only one with dependents, tells her to leave. Leo allows her to go. He asks Sally if she has children. In an effort to protect her, Adam lies and says she does but Leo, who has downloaded the company's personnel file knows that neither Adam nor Sally have children. He also says he doesn't have children and considers all three of them expendable. Feeling that their situation is hopeless, Adam and Sally start to laugh as they look back on their lives. Leo gets agitated and when the phone rings, he makes Sally answer it. The police have patched into Adam's computer and they have the leader of the environmental group on the other end. While Leo is looking at the computer, a police sniper kills him but the bomb doesn't go off as Leo claimed. Sally and Adam join the rest of the staff at the bar downstairs. When the leader of the environmental group arrives to express his regrets. Sally angrily tells him that, by using inflammatory speech, he is responsible for Leo's death. The executive committee meets with Adam's friend and agrees to proceed with the deal contingent on the outcome of an independent environmental assessment commissioned by Gardner Ross. Also, his firm must donate 1% of annual profits to an environmental impact fund. Gardner verified Leo's claims with researchers at 2 different universities who both confirm they are not without merit. In his defense, Adam's friend claims that the plant surpasses both Canadian and Honduran standards but when Adam suggests he approach another bank, he agrees to the terms.
26	13	"Us and Them"	Alan Taylor (director)	Hart Hanson	1997
The show begins with Adam announcing to the board spectacular returns from both the trading floor and corporate finance when Mike returns from South Korea to interrupt the meeting. The Korean bank has given him their proxies to attend the board meeting and vote on their behalf much to Jack, Adam and Sally's consternation. He also informs them that he is under instruction to request a seat on the executive committee. Privately, Adam suggests that they quietly buy back shares to consolidate their position to avoid giving up control. Aware of Ann's interest in corporate finance, Jack suggests that they invest in a software project together but she initially declines due to their personal relationship. Ann later asks Grant for his opinion on the software company. When she learns he doesn't like it because the package they offer is too user-friendly, she changes her mind about investing with Jack. Sally asks Marty to start buying Gardner stock for the firm even though the price is high due to the Jakarta harbor project deal. Knowing of their relationship, the other traders approach Ann to find out why the firm is buying its own stock. When she tells them the two of them broke up, the traders start betting on whether they will get back together again or not. During a lunch meeting with David Astin, it is revealed that Gardner scooping the Jakarta harbor project from the big bank has caused David some difficulty professionally. The chairman then pulls Adam aside and apologizes before saying he intends to merge Gardner into his bank with Adam becoming his successor. Later on, back at the firm, when Adam tells Jack and Sally about the offer, they all decide that he should stall his response to the acquiring bank's overtures. Gardner's stock is rising as a result of buying by the acquiring large bank. Marty tricks Sally into confirming that Gardner is in play. Victor arranges a meeting between himself and Jack. He discloses that he knows the terms of the loan that Jack took out to buy his share of Gardner Ross at 3 times book value and claims his bank bought the debt of Jack's load issuer. If Jack does not agree to sell his shares of Gardner, the large bank will foreclose on his loan. When the shares hit the market, the large bank will then be able to buy them on the open market. Jack will have to repay the loan or the large bank will call it. David Astin later warns Adam that if he does not cooperate, the large bank will not abandon the takeover attempt and, if it succeeds there will be no place for him at the merged firm. When Jack and Sally discuss it later, neither are sure if the large bank is bluffing. He suggests that she buy his shares back from him but, due securities commission regulations, she cannot. If he sells to Gardner, the large bank will only need 35% of the firm to take it over. Since this information would give Adam a lot of leverage, they decide not to tell him. Since Jack bought the shares at 3 times book value, he will suffer a loss he sells them back to Gardner at market value so instead of buying his shares, Sally offers to finance the debt he had to incur to buy them. He negotiates several extra guarantees before they come to agreement. Donald tells jack that a bug in the program will cause a 2 month delay in the release by the software company. Concerned about the delay, Ann decides to pull out of the deal. Due to his current financial instability, Jack also pulls out. Marty notices that the acquiring bank's stock price is also rising. They figure out that a Japanese firm is attempting to acquire Cancorp. When Mike tries to enter an executive committee meeting, Adam locks him out. They all ignore his pleas to get in. When he later demands to know what happened at the meeting, they hint that they were planning his surprise welcome party. Sally meets with David Astin who promises to put her in charge of international deals with full autonomy from Adam if Gardner is merged into the larger bank. Knowing that Adam has been offered chairmanship, she calls him on his lie since all departments would have to fall under his supervision. Astin responds by saying that either of the two offers can be taken. A press release announcing that Cancorp. now owns 20% of Gardner takes the firm by surprise. They then realize that the Korean bank, after buying Mike's Gardner Ross shares, has partnered with the acquiring bank to take over Gardner. Mike is removed from the executive committee. Marty proposes that the best thing to do might be to help the Japanese bank that is trying to acquire Cancorp who is in turn trying to acquire Gardner by buying enough of the Japanese bond to catch the large bank in a short squeeze. If it works, the large bank will not be able to reach its commitment and they will lose their license to trade in Japan. Donald informs Jack that he is unable to find any investors for the software development company. When he realizes that Ann has killed the deal by getting everyone to buy the other software company, he confronts her. Having to finance the whole deal himself has him facing bankruptcy. Ostracized by the other traders, Ann later quits. Benny decides to help Jack by investing most of the $600,000 that Jack is on the hook for himself. Cathy, Grant and Donald agree to help out by participating too. Tommy turns down a job offer that Sally helped him get. Jack has an altercation with Victor Kennilworth. After Victor suggests that Jack got his kicked by his girlfriend, Jack punches him. On the trading floor, when the price of the Japanese bond rises, they ignore a buy order from Cancorp. Soon after, Cancorp begins selling its stake in Gardner. Marty's plan worked, thereby saving the firm from takeover. Adam purchased 500,000 shares of the large bank through Ann. David Astin shows up at the firm to congratulate Adam on his profit from the trade. Cancorp's stock is rising high enough to prevent its takeover by the acquiring Japanese bank. David accompanies the police to arrest Jack for assault. He also warns Adam that it is only a matter of time before Gardner Ross is taken over by a larger bank. When Jack's nephew learns that the police are looking for Jack but have not found him yet, he goes to an industrial park to find his uncle sitting on top of a large tank, drinking and looking at the city skyline. When Jack tells him to leave, he stubbornly stays. The season ends with them yelling together.

=== Season 3 (1997–98) ===
No. overall	No. in season	Title	Directed by	Written by	Original release date
27	1	"Dark Sanctuary"	Alex Chapple	Hart Hanson	1997
Jack has sold his condominium and has been sleeping in his office. In defending the takeover, the firm has lost so much capital that most of the firm's staff have left or been fired. The executive committee tries to come up with recapitalization scenarios. Before the committee meeting is over, the police arrive to arrest Jack. In court to enter his plea, Jack notices David Astin in the courtroom. Jack's outbursts in court prompt the judge to give him three days in jail, after which he must enter his plea. Marty and Benny have a trading idea but cannot execute it due to the firm's low capital position. Sally visits the trading floor later to assure the skeletal staff that the firm will not go under. When Marty ridicules her, she demands that he hire a foreign exchange trader by the following day. Marty convinces Chris to return. While a financial TV show announces that Adam made $12 million speculating on the large bank's stock, Sally suggests that the judge's dislike for Jack might have been prearranged as if someone might have influenced the choice of judge to hear Jack's case. Adam tells her he actually made $15 million on the trade and shows surprise when he hears that David Astin was in the court. In jail, Jack is harassed by another inmate. He soon gets into his first fight. Adam goes on a date with a woman who has close ties to a high-level government person who might be able to help recapitalized the firm if it can buy the debt of an airline name Algonquin Air. Expecting that he will be charged with assault and be barred from working in the securities industry as a result, Adam prepares to give Jack's office away. Adam offers Ian Farnham a job but he initially refuses. When he tells Ian that they have an airline debt issue in the works and suggests that he will get more experience from the ten-day deal than in 10 years of working in his current position, Ian becomes more interested. After Adam assures him that he is not making the offer as a favor to Ian's mother, Ian becomes even more amenable. Sally and Grant later visit him in jail but Jack is unwilling to help her find a way to re-capitalize and suggests she asks Donald for help. When Grant sees a woman who was talking to the inmate who beat Jack up crying, he offers her a handkerchief. Later, Grant suggest to Cathy that they try to get Jack out of jail but she refuses to help. While in jail, Jack suspects that there is a conspiracy against him. He decides to plead guilty. When Benny overhears Marty making job interview arrangements, he points out that the firm cannot survive without Marty. Grant asks Ann to help her get Jack out of jail. The two of them meet the inmate who beat up Jack along with the inmate's lawyer to offer his wife a forgivable loan if he protects Jack for the remainder of his time in jail. Benny tells Sally of the day's events on the trading floor and also informs her that Marty has a dinner interview. Realizing that the firm has to do a deal in order to re-capitalize, she changes her mind on the Algonquin Air deal. In order to persuade Marty to sell Algonquin stock, she decides to offer him more money and a seat on the executive committee. Behind Adam's back, Sally approaches Ian's mother and promises to underwrite Algonquin if Ian's mother will be transparent about what Gardner will get in return for the deal. Later, Donald's analysis concludes that the only way to structure the Algonquin issue would be to use a high-yield convertible bond. While the two of them are working, Adam interrupts them to confront Sally over her communication with Ian's mother. He tells Sally that, in return for Algonquin, Gardner Ross will be the new fiscal agent for the maritime provinces, an arrangement that should bring in about $50 million per year. He then informs Sally that he has hired Ian to replace Jack while he's in jail. Jack's adversary inmate warns him to stay away. Later, the inmate confronts Jack but runs away when Jack doesn't back down. Before leaving prison, he tells Jack about the offer that Ann and Grant gave him. After looking at the preliminary Algonquin prospectus, Marty tells Sally that he could sell it but refuses to do so because he considers it beneath him. When Donald points out that it's on him to keep the firm together with Jack gone, he relents. Later, Marty tells the other members of the firm that, while he could sell the bond, it would kill its reputation. Ian advises him to make the issue sound overly complex and convince more junior salespeople that it's a sure bet but Marty still does not agree to sell it. Adam and Sally offer to make him a principal of the firm and member of the executive committee if he sells it. The issue does not go as well as hoped. Gardner has to subscribe to a half of it. In court later, Jack pleads not guilty. At the end of the episode, it is revealed that Adam and Ian's mother are intimate and that he has hired Ian as a favor to his mother.
28	2	"Some Lies, Mostly Secrets"	Keith Ross Leckie	Alyson Feltes	1997
Jack returns to find Ian in his office and forces both Donald and Ian to leave. Jack later receives a suspension notice from the investment dealer's association pending a conduct hearing. They decide to appeal the decision but, in the meantime, Jack cannot be at the offices of Gardner Ross. At the executive committee meeting, it is revealed that Gardner is stuck with $50 million of the Algonquin Air convertible debt. In order to avoid being liable for so much of the issue, they come up with a plan that could be construed as stock manipulation that Marty agrees to execute. After Marty leaves the meeting, they discuss finding a way to earn quick cash without incurring much overhead. Marty starts giving traders at other firms the impression that he has not sold 80% of Algonquin but then assigns Cathy to start buying its common stock. On the trading floor, Sally gets an idea for a deal after Marty explains why he is speculating on a tobacco stock and asks him to buy 9.9% of the company. At the next executive committee meeting Sally and Marty vote to take over a tobacco company since it generates a lot of cash. During a still later meeting, Donald tells Sally that he has a moral problem with the firm buying a tobacco company and suggests some software companies instead. At 18% ownership, Gardner Ross finds it odd that the tobacco company has not requested a meeting. Adam sets Ian up to speak with Ann to find out why. The meeting ends with Ann telling Ian to tell Adam that she appreciates his offer but she's not interested. Ian relays to Adam Ann's confirmation that the tobacco company is the type of cash generator that Sally thinks it is. On his own, Ian has learned that the reason the tobacco company did not arrange a meeting with Gardner is because their chairman plans to fight a takeover attempt. When Gardner calls a meeting with the tobacco company, they learn that the company plans to leave the tobacco business within three years. It plans to enter the less profitable but less litigious nutraceuticals industry. Sally ends the meeting by telling them that any attempts to diversify will be opposed by Gardner Ross. After the meeting, Adam, who directly opposes Sally's position on the tobacco company, asks Ian to find a way to come to some compromise with the tobacco company. At the end of the trading day, Adam, Benny and Marty think that they failed in their attempted takeover of the tobacco company. The following morning, Donald and Ian try to interest Adam in their plan for the tobacco company but since he expects the deal to falter, he does not give it much consideration. While Marty is trying to convince Sally to give up on their takeover, Adam enters to announce that the tobacco company wants to meet with Gardner Ross. Later on, while Gardner is negotiating with the tobacco company, Ann delivers shares accounting for 14% of the company, giving Gardner a controlling stake in the company. Later, at the executive meeting committee, Marty is infuriated at Sally's decision to bring Ann back to the firm. As Jack is about to leave the firm, Sally stops him. Although he cannot work at the firm's offices, after they take over Algonquin, she wants him to break up the company. After he physically confronts her, she asks the receptionist to collect his pass and keys. In response, Jack starts to hitchhike back to Vancouver but happens upon a Catholic priest at a truck stop. After talking, Jack decides not to run away. Jack later shows up at the firm, apologizes to Ian, asks Donald if he can stay on his couch and asks Sally for the Algonquin Air job. She gives him the job on the condition that he report the executive committee weekly. Feeling slighted by Adam's close relationship with Ian, Donald asks Adam if Ian is in line for his job but Adam assures him that it's not the case. Adam offers Ann a position as a proprietary trader. Knowing she will have difficulty winning the approval of other members of the firm, she refuses the offer until Adam divulges that, by the end of the year, he will have created a billion dollar mutual fund that he wants her to manage. When Sally and Ann meet away from the firm, Ann offers to get her a large block of the tobacco company stock in exchange for a position at the firm away from the trading floor. Sally takes her up on her offer.
29	3	"Nobody's Boy"	Gord Langevin	Ann MacNaughton	1997
A client of Adam's plans to build luxury condos on a hospital site where a clinic for women at risk currently stands, thereby forcing the women to travel far out of the city to go for help. Later on, during a meeting with a bureaucrat, Adam and his property developer client discover that there is a higher bid then theirs for the hospital they intend to turn into luxury condominiums. They infer that since the government did not take the higher bid, there must be something they do not understand. They decide to investigate the other bidder to find out why. The competing bid is $5M higher and comes from an American company that plans to turn the hospital into a highly profitable wellness center offering many services not covered by Canada's universal health care. They deduce that the reason why the government is being so slow to accept the American offer is that the services they offer would spell the end of universal health care. At the private club during a discussion with a politician in the sauna later, Adam is told that he will not be sitting at the head table with the UN Secretary General as promised before. When queried about the change, the politician points out that when he was promised head table before, the American company was not about to introduce two-tier medicine into Canada. It is revealed that Adam wants a UN posting so he promises to block the American health and wellness company's bid if he can get a seat at the head table. In a meeting with Donald and Sally later, Adam states that Gardner will need to increase their investment stake and lower fee to come up with the extra $5M required. Sally is not interested in further investing in a long-term deal with a relatively small yield and is skeptical of why Adam is so eager to finance it. Adam offers the doctor trying to save the women's clinic money to set up a new clinic but she replies that it's not enough until he explains that his client's bid was not accepted and her clinic is being evicted by an American health care company. As a result, the protesters turn their anger toward the government. After being accosted by the protesters, the same bureaucrat who originally refused them meets with Adam and Donald again. He agrees to accept their bid as long as it beats the rival bid. Adam also receives a golden invitation to the UN Secretary General dinner. Sally refuses to increase Gardner's exposure to the luxury condo project. She suggests co-opting a Canadian health group's deal into the condo developer's. When Adam is supposed to meet with the condo developers and the health concern, he feigns sickness and, thinking that Donald will mess up the meeting, asks him to attend in his place but Donald pulls off the deal. At another meeting later, the developer and the Canadian health care concern come to a joint agreement on the site that includes a provision for the women at risk clinic to stay at the site rent free. Afterward, Adam asks the clinic doctor out for dinner. At the UN Secretary General meeting later, Adam's politician contact tells him that building the health and wellness center will adversely affect his political aspirations. Adam responds that he has helped the politician by keeping the hospital health and wellness center Canadian and bought Canada's politicians time to come up with new rules for private health services. Jack gives an invitation to have dinner with the United Nations Secretary General to Grant, who is more interested in attending. When he sees Ann at the firm, he confronts Sally and the rest of the executive committee over it. He also confronts her over her unwillingness to protest his suspension. At Algonquin, Jack lays off 160 staff members in one day. When the COO of the airline cannot renegotiate a deal with a supplier, Jack steps in and gets better terms. When the COO refuses to authorize the sale of the shipping facility to another airline, Jack fires him. Later, when Ian shows Jack that the luggage tracking system developed by the COO that he fired is more advanced than others in the industry, Jack initially responds by increasing the asking price of the baggage handling system. Jack explains the baggage handling system to Sally and she also thinks that he should make it part of the sell-off but he has changed his mind. He suggests they purchase the rights and develop the technology themselves. When she refuses, he meets with the COO he fired to offer him a chance to buy the technology and license it out himself. At the end of the episode, Jack tries to convince Sally that he can turn the airline around instead of dismantling it and she offers him the chance to turn the airline around in 2 years. Benny has an undisclosed medical condition. At the bar later, Marty tricks Benny into admitting he has a health problem and Ann's attempt at reconciliation is rebuffed by everyone but Chris. When he finds out that Benny's health problem is hemorrhoids the following day, Marty ridicules him about it. When Ann enters the trading floor to offer helpful information to Marty, he makes it clear that she is not to enter the trading pit and he does not want to communicate with her at all. Cathy finds a stock recommendation that Ann has personally left behind and the floor acts on it. Ann later admits intentionally planting a stock recommendation knowing that Cathy would act on and profit from it.
30	4	"Turnaround Is Fair Play"	Alan Goluboff	Michael Teversham	1997
The show begins with Adam hosting a horse breeding event. During the event, someone opens a bottle of champagne and the popping sound of the bottle being opened scares the horses causes the mare to kick the stud in the genitals, rendering him sterile and afraid of mares. As a last-ditch effort to recoup his $12 million loss on the stud, Adam considers Grant's suggestion that they clone the stud and the two of them meet with a scientist to discuss it. Later, during a meeting with other investors, Adam buys one of the investors out. The scientist is having trouble cloning the $12M horse but assures Adam that, with repeated trials, a clone will be made. Later on, when the investor that rejected the cloning idea offers him $12M for the horse to prevent the cloning, Adam sells. Grant gets angry because he realizes that Adam only used cloning as a negotiating ploy to recover his investment back. Adam and Sally meet with Jack to tell him that they need the airline to be profitable in 16 months and not the original 24. Having difficulty with the remaining employees, Jack and Ian move to establish an employee stock ownership program but, not trusting Jack, the employees reject it. Not knowing of their history, Ian brings Ann in to help find a more palatable stock ownership alternative and the airline employees accept Ann's stock ownership proposal. Jack is approached by a mercenary named Jean-Paul Brunet who had planned to buy Algonquin's airplanes during the expected break-up. An Algonquin plane later crashes thereby jeopardizing the survival of the airline. Still trying to save it, Jack and Ian try to prepare the airline for the safety board but a maintenance log is missing. They suspect that the head mechanic who called in sick took the log book and visit his home since it is only the second time he has called in sick in 40 years. When Jack asks him if he's covering up for another employee, he assures Jack that the flight was checked out but admits that it was never signed over. His not signing it over was a protest but he assures Jack that the plane was airworthy. Jack asks him to sign the maintenance log and put it back but, knowing that would be fraudulent, the mechanic refuses. While they are talking, the transport authority suspends all flights pending mechanical inspection of Algonquin's fleet. Back at the airline, Jack meets with the press, expresses confidence in the airline staff, assures them that the crash is not due to mechanical failure and takes full responsibility for the crash if it is. Back at Gardner, Sally tells Adam that she intends to support him if the investigation does not find the airline at fault for the crash. Jack again meets with Jean-Paul and agrees to sell three planes for $16 million with payment made before delivery. Investigators from the transportation safety board attribute the crash to a freak wind shear thereby absolving the airline of all responsibility and the suspension is lifted.
31	5	"Pledge of Allegiance"	Stacey Stewart Curtis	Maureen McKeon	1997
Ann asks Marty for permission to borrow Grant for a credit union client of hers to trade derivatives for a few days. Grant gets angry at Marty for saying that he would wipe out the credit union but Marty allows him to trade for the credit union if he does twice as much volume for Marty. At 30 minutes before market close, Grant's trading on behalf of the credit union is up $300,000 so Ann tells him to stop. Despite her initial objections, he runs a new market algorithm that immediately brings profits up to $500,000. Soon after she leaves his office, he makes a change and the profit quickly turns into a loss. Smitten by Ann, he covers his loss by embezzling from one of the other trading accounts. When he tells Benny, Benny tells Ann what happened. She is initially reluctant to help Grant. Marty later confronts Grant about the embezzlement he has discovered and warns him not to do it again. Benny is such a mess after Cathy's leaving that Marty asks him not to deal with any clients. Sally meets with an ice skate manufacturer client of Jack's who is trying to raise capital to expand his product line into roller hockey. Annoyed by his behavior, Sally tells him that his company is not attractive enough for Gardner to finance. She suggests that he sell his company to an American sports manufacturer looking to get into hockey gear but he nationalistically he refuses to hear of it. After the meeting, feeling undermined by Ian's chumminess with the client, she takes him off the account. Since Sally has never played hockey, Ian tries to explain the skate manufacturer's personality to her even though she removed him from the account. He also asks her to ask the client to autograph his hockey card from his professional days. When Sally meets with the skate manufacturer at an ice rink, he says he doesn't want to sell out to the Americans but when she proposes that he take inline skate production offshore to lower costs and keep ice skate production in Canada, he becomes more receptive. Later on, at the firm, he insists on good working and living conditions for his workers if he will manufacture inline skates in a Third World country. During the meeting, they learn that his company's trading volumes have risen. He initially suspects that Sally has approached an American firm until she explains that it's probably an American competitor that has become more interested in his firm as a result of its increased sponsorship. After Ian defends her, she invites him back on the deal. Sally later confirms the American sports manufacturer's intent to take over her client's firm by hostile takeover if necessary. Marty refuses to act on the takeover attempt without consulting Adam so Sally comes up with an unorthodox plan to defend the skate manufacturer. As a bluff, she decides to begin outsourced manufacturing talks with Cuba and leak that information to the press. Under the Helms-Burton Act, American companies cannot do business in Cuba so it will force them to back away from a takeover. When they hesitate, the company can then set up manufacturing in Taiwan and Malaysia instead. When the skate manufacturer meets with a Cuban representative, the bluff turns into a potential deal. An old shoe factory can meet all present and future needs of the skate manufacturer, the factory is safe from Helms Burton litigation and it meets working and living conditions for employees he requires. Adam is against the skate manufacturer setting up operations in Cuba and confronts Sally. If Sally's deal goes through, his deal to finance a bridge in America will not. After Adam tells her that he has also arranged financing from an American bank to the tune of $100M per year, she decides to tell her client that the deal is off but then changes her mind after Donald tells her that the American bank has not committed to the deal as Adam claimed. When the news hits the press, it destroys all prospects of a deal with the American bank. To avoid putting the ice skate manufacturer at further risk of takeover, Jack and Sally propose a private placement to hockey fans. When Jack receives word from the investment dealers association wanting to reinstate him as a banker on the condition that he make a public apology to Victor Kennilworth and Cancorp. and also go for anger management counseling, Jack is disinterested replying and tells the lawyer that he wants to stay with the airline. Jack soon leaves to meet the buyer of Algonquin's aircraft in a war torn country to receive payment for the 3 planes he sold. At the airport in the Third World country, Jack meets Joe Fitzpatrick, a man who owns a claim in what could become a diamond mine in the future. Jack soon learns that Joe has been successful in prospecting in the past. During a poker game, the man loses a 20% share of his claim to Jack. Their game is interrupted by the mercenary who arrives with $13M of the money. After Jack receives payment, he pays the mine owner $200,000 for 51% of the mine. After he returns, Sally is dismayed at Jack having purchased 51% of the diamond mine claim on behalf of Gardner Ross using an old checkbook even though he has no signing authority. When Sally visits the airline later, she learns of the reinstatement letter from the investment dealers association. Jack explains that he will not make the required apology. Wanting him to return to the firm, she offers to apologize on his behalf, find a psychiatrist who says he won't need anger management, hire a management company to replace him and either give him $1M or provide for full backing on the diamond claim. Due to a NAFTA crisis, the American ambassador is unable to attend the function that Adam, Donald and Ian's mother have all traveled to attend. Ian asks Sally out but, thinking that he is only doing it to spy on her for Adam, she refuses. When Adam learns that Ian asked Sally out for a drink, sensing a change in loyalty, he suggests sending Ian to the airline to replace Jack. Sally takes him up on his drink offer.
32	6	"A Soldier's Virtue"	Reid Dunlop	Hart Hanson	1997
Ziggy starts on the trading floor. She offers Marty a trading idea but he ignores it. While on a finance show, a microphone falls into Sally's blouse causing a comical situation. A multi-billionaire named Phil Hoagland who has seen the show is smitten and shows up at the firm with flowers for Sally. Later, she refuses to see Phil when he unexpectedly shows up at the firm because she is with a client. Before he leaves, Adam tells him about a charity event Sally has planned for the afternoon. Phil shows up at croquet to meet Sally. A chemical company pulls out of a deal Jack is working on as a result of his assault charge. The owner of the company for sale, who is homosexual, suspects that to be the reason for the pullout. At croquet, Donald meets an employee from the company that Sally trashed on TV. When Donald asks him if Sally was wrong about the company, he replies that she was and gives him the world's smallest voice-activated recorder which is made by the company. During the game, a mallet slips from Donald's hand, flies through the air and hits Victor on the head, knocking him out. Feeling responsible, Donald stays with him at the hospital until he regains consciousness. When Donald expresses concern that his retina might have been detached again, the investment banker replies that it was never detached to begin with. He lied to set Jack up. In his stupor, he also divulges that his bank holds the chemical company's line of credit and his bank threatened to revoke it if Gardner Ross was chosen to lead the deal. Not yet knowing this, Jack tells his client that the reason the acquiring firm is pulling out is because of the assault charge and not the client's sexual orientation. In response, the client turns down Jack's offer to let him go with another banker. The morning after a sleepless night at the hospital Donald is about to tell Jack what the competing banker told him when Jack rudely interrupts him to demand more prospective suitors to buy his client's company. Sally returns to her office to find it filled with balloons from Phil. When Jack pops one of them, they discover that they are all filled with cubic zirconias. On the phone later, Phil tells Sally that one of the cubic zirconias is a real diamond. When Donald shows Adam the voice-activated recorder, Adam takes it. Later, in his office, Adam listens to everything recorded for the day. Unknown to anyone, he discovers Victor's admissions. At lunch with David Astin, Adam offers to replace Jack if the chairman allows the chemical company to do the merger with Jack's client. When the chairman refuses, Adam realizes that the big bank wants Jack and hands David a transcript of the recorded conversation. Not telling Jack about the taped conversation, Adam offers to take the lead on the deal and Jack accepts. When he announces the change the following morning, Donald tells him that he was set up by the other bank. Jack arranges a meeting between his client and Sally's fast food client. After an executive committee meeting, all members vote against Adam, allowing Jack to retain lead the deal. At a bar, Jack sees the investment banker who previously got him thrown into jail. Victor has lost his job and asks Jack if there are any opportunities available at Gardner Ross. Jack ignores him. The financial show host announces a challenge to Sally to use the voice stress analyzer on the air to support her previous claims about its manufacturer. When Sally reappears on the finance show opposite Phil Hoagland, they ask each other questions to test a voice stress analyzer made by the company that Sally previously trashed on the show that is now owned by Phil. Sally gets Phil to admit that her negative recommendation on his company was solid. At the end, they agree to dinner together. For her recommendation on the technology company Phil owns, Marty decides to give Ziggy a chance to become a trader.
33	7	"Profit and Prejudice"	Henry Sarwer-Foner	Maureen McKeon	1998
Pauline and Adam are enjoying a private moment at his home when Ann interrupts them to show Adam an offer she has received to head up a mutual fund from a rival investment bank. The following day, Adam proposes the mutual fund idea at the executive committee meeting but, feeling that the existence of his trading floor will be threatened, Marty opposes the idea. Realizing that the fund manager will want to be on the executive committee, Sally decides that the manager candidate's election must be agreed on unanimously by the current committee. Adam begins establishing the mutual fund. He then announces to the trading floor that the inception of the fund does not mean there will be firings from the trading floor but Marty is not convinced. When Adam asks him how he can ease Marty's mind over the mutual fund inception, Marty asks for half of the fund's capital. Adam promises him a third. Marty soon figures out that Adam has Ann in mind for the manager position so, after hours, Marty convinces Donald to apply for fund manager. The civil war in the country where Jack landed a diamond claim has ended and Jack is eager to proceed with the mine development but Sally wants to hold off until the country stabilizes. She later relents and commits $500,000 to diamond mine development. Donald and Jack decide to use the money to buy a shell company on the Vancouver Stock Exchange, issue a prospectus on the diamond mine and make a stock offering to raise the $1 million they need to proceed with the second drilling but Sally doesn't want to be associated with the VSE. They propose that Sally, Jack and Joe Fitzpatrick be given signing authority but, since Gardner is putting up all of the capital, Sally does not want the prospector to have any signing authority and proposes Adam instead. The diamond mining shell company quickly drops to $0.04, down from its $0.30 issue price. Jack agrees to back Ann as mutual fund manager if she helps drive up the price of his diamond mine. Key members of the firm start to realize that Adam promised Ann a mutual fund to lure her back to the firm. Jack and the prospector meet with Jean-Paul and they form a deal getting him to underwrite the $1M second drilling expedition in return for a share of the company. The results of the second drilling expedition are stellar. In a private discussion between the two of them, Sally agrees to consider Donald as manager for the new fund. The executive committee proposes Donald as manager of the fund with Marty as co-head. Adam initially refuses to vote in favor but relents thinking that Marty will not be approved due to his trading record. When Ann finds out that Donald has been offered the fund manager position and goes straight to Sally to discuss it. She offers to contribute the 5% of the diamond stock she bought as seed money for the fund, something that Donald cannot offer. She also promises not to vote with Adam all of the time. Due to his securities commission infractions, Marty cannot have any association with the fund, torpedoing Donald's chances of becoming fund manager. They agree on Ann as manager but nobody nominates her for the executive committee. Expecting interest rates to drop in contrast to market expectations, Benny wants to buy bonds. Marty agrees to let him act on his idea even though Benny will lose his job if he is wrong. Benny's bond speculation turns out to be profitable.
34	8	"Meltdown"	John L'Ecuyer	David S. Young	1998
The episode starts with Grant having a nightmare about the world ending. He is convinced that it is a prophecy. At the executive meeting, members discuss a solar company. After the meeting, Adam calls a broker who owes him a favor and discovers that Sally has a heavy position the solar company in her blind trust. During a heated discussion, it is revealed that Sally doesn't know the blind trust is holding the solar company. In order for the solar company merger to go through, Sally has to put up her Gardner Ross shares, leaving Adam with the only voting shares. When she tells Jack that her shares will be put up if the solar stock drops below a certain price, he responds that they must keep the stock price above that level. Jack asks Ann if she knows anyone who would be willing to buy shares in Sally's solar stock. She calls a German buyer to offer him the solar stock but has to sweeten the deal with 350,000 diamond mine shares. Adam finds out from friends he has at the German bank about the deal Ann and Jack offered. After the price of the solar company hits $16, Sally is forced to put her shares of Gardner into escrow. Jack has to loan Sally $10M to get her shares back and keep Adam from controlling the firm. A movie about the world ending causes a severe market correction. At the end of the day, the firm is unable to meet its capital requirements or margin call due the following morning. The compliance officer tells Sally that, with Adam's signed authorization, Marty shorted 8 million shares of the solar stock while it was on the restricted list but compliance is unable to find any evidence of the trade. Sally asks Grant, who is a computer whiz, to help the compliance officer investigate. He finds a ghost trade in an account in the name of Adam's wife. When Ann meets with Grant later, it turns out that a program he developed was responsible for her up day. Grant innocently tells Adam that he is responsible for Ann's trading gains from the previous day. Adam gets Ann to hand over an account's details so he can hide Marty's solar short trade profits. Needing Adam's signature to sell the diamond mining stock, Jack and Sally consider violating regulations by transferring the stock without signature but Sally does not go through with it. The compliance officer offers not to report the ghost trade to the securities commission for $1M from Adam and Marty. Marty refuses but, disgusted that he used Adam's late wife's account, Adam agrees to pay. Not aware that she has bought back her voting shares, Adam orders Sally to sell her shares in the solar company. She also forces Adam to sell Jack the shares he lost a year ago at book value. If he refuses, Sally will alert the compliance officer to where the profits from the solar stock short are hidden. The episode ends at Grants 'End of the World' party. Sally returns Jack's $10M and offers him Gardner Ross shares.
35	9	"Hope Chasers"	Steve DiMarco	Alyson Feltes	1998
Benny formally divorces his wife, leaving him more sensitive to his faith. Back at the firm later, he disobeys Marty's order to get rid of Israeli bonds. After Ziggy shows Marty the position in Israeli bonds that Benny lied about, Marty freezes the account causing an outburst from Benny. After Benny has finished, Marty makes it clear that trading decisions should not be made based on religious conviction. After Sally helps Phil buy a cement factory from a rival family, he commissions her and Jack to help him buy properties along the St. Lawrence seaway before legislation is passed making the seaway nonprofit. Adam thinks the project is being used as a test of Gardner's capabilities by Phil. Buying the St. Lawrence seaway will use up most of Phil's capital and lead to a significant rise in operating costs. Not sure if Phil is testing them or not, Sally does not know whether Phil wants them to tell him that buying the seaway is impossible or if he wants them to find a creative way to make the buy. When she asks him what his intentions are, he responds that he wants to reclaim the seaway so he can preserve it. Sally finds a way for Phil to purchase the St. Lawrence seaway and the structures that feed into it. She presents an ambitious long-term plan to buy all of the shipping and holding facilities in the Great Lakes but Adam is concerned that the deal would consume Gardner's resources for a long time into the future. Phil likes the plan and wants Sally and Gardner Ross to execute it but she refuses the offer responding that she does not want to spend her life pursuing someone else's dream. Jack finds Ann shooting heroin in her bathroom and angrily leaves. Later, after receiving a phone call from her, Jack finds Ann passed out on her bathroom floor after a heroin overdose.
36	10	"The Afterlife"	Gord Langevin	Ann MacNaughton	1998
The episode begins with Ann in the hospital emergency room. While jogging, Sally is approached by a young MBA student named Trisha Kennedy who wants to work as an intern but Sally turns her down. When Sally arrives at the firm, she finds a large client in the reception area waiting on Ann. Later, due to Trisha's persistence, Sally takes her on as an intern. Adam engages a Canadian 20 funeral parlor undertaker who wants to start a discount funeral chain but Adam doesn't want Gardner to be associated with any kind of discount operation. Adam promises to raise $30M in a private placement for the Canadian undertaker but, hoping to gain some free advertising, the undertaker prefers a public offering. Adam is approached by another funeral home operator who has seen an infomercial for his client's modest interment business. He first offers to buy out the entire modest interment business but, knowing his client would be unlikely to sell, Adam suggests that he make an offer for the Southern Ontario operations instead. He offers 25% more than the price Adam suggests. At their next meeting, Adam offers to buy out his client's Southern Ontario operations for $10M but he refuses. In a meeting with Adam's undertaker client and a competing undertaker, the competitor offers $15M for his southern Ontario funeral homes on the condition that he not promote his modest interment business in any of the competitor's areas. The profit that Adam's client will make from his southern Ontario holdings will allow him to market his modest interment in other markets. Adam suggests that undertakers throughout the country who might be threatened by discount funerals might also be willing to buy out his operation making him a huge profit. After learning of Ann's condition and whereabouts, Adam, Sally and Jack decide that Donald would be the best person to act as fund manager in her absence. Marty meets with Donald to convince him to take the fund management opportunity. The traders start taking bets on the reason for Ann's absence. After Ann's large fund client meets with Donald and Marty, he decides to pull out. Later, the securities commission receives a complaint about Marty's involvement with the fund since he is not registered. To Marty's dismay, as fund manager, Donald sells off the fund's gold stock to invest in oil and gas. In an executive committee meeting later, Donald justifies his decision by pointing out that a mutual fund is not well equipped to do short-term trading like the trading floor. After faxing the fund holdings to the large investor who earlier pulled out, the investor reverses his earlier decision and decides not to withdraw from the fund. Donald then negotiates terms as a fund manager with Sally.
37	11	"Independence Days"	Stephen Williams (director)	Michael Teversham	1998
Trisha is in the reception area when a man enters wanting to see Jack. When she tells him that Jack is in a meeting, he forces her to take him to the meeting at gunpoint. Jack deftly confronts him taking away what is actually a water gun. It turns out that he is an old friend of Jack's named Sonny who wants Jack to raise capital to finance a television venture. Adam and Sally are not interested in Sonny's company because it would cause a conflict of interest with a preexisting client. Adam was also previously involved with Sonny on a deal that went bad. Encountering resistance from the others, Jack personally gives Sonny money to move forward. Even though Donald manages a resource fund, Jack suggests he buy into Sonny's media technology company. Later on, not remembering having dealt with him before, Sonny walks into Adam's office to ask why Adam refuses to deal with him. They straighten things out after a discussion. Sally tells Donald not to buy into Sonny's deal. When she discusses Jack's insistence on proceeding with the deal despite the executive committee decision not to, he decides to go on vacation. At home, Jack and Sonny try to find other ways to float the deal without Gardner Ross. Sonny suggests they try Cancorp. Knowing his is barred from their offices, Jack bribes his way past security at a private club to speak with David Astin. David won't consider the deal but suggests that Jack leave Gardner. When the chairman meets with Adam later, he learns that Cancorp. is likely to take the deal. In a discussion with Sally later, Adam suggests they fire Jack. While at his apartment, David appears with proof that Sonny is willing to dissolve his partnership with Jack and work with Cancorp. instead. He offers Jack a position as VP of corporate finance with the discretion to do deals up to $500M. Later on, Jack confronts Sonny over Sonny's attempt to cut him out of the deal. He points out that he refused the chairman's offer to cut Sonny out of the deal and that the chairman was only using Sonny to get Jack to relocate to Cancorp. In response, Sonny offers to let Jack buy him out but that is unworkable. They agree that the deal includes the two of them or it does not happen. Donald later declines to finance Jack and Sonny's deal from the mutual fund. During an executive meeting, Adam moves to dismiss Jack but Sally suggests they set up an independent merchant bank under Jack's leadership seeded with his capital so that Jack has more freedom to pursue deals. This arrangement will give Gardner a first look at any deal. Jack agrees to do the deal with Sonny if Sonny holds back on his plans to expand into China and put his island up as collateral. After Marty tries to discover Ann's whereabouts from Grant, Jack gives Grant a whistle to blow anytime Marty tries to extract information about why Ann is not at work. When Marty goes to Grant's office to find out what happened to Ann, Grant blows on the whistle that Jack gave him before telling Marty that Ann's dead. After Marty orders Chris to make a trade against his will, the computers go down. On her first day, Trisha sends the wrong prospectus to a client. Sally tasks her with writing a proposal. While working on the proposal, Trisha gets a little helpful advice from Adam. Sally and Phil break up while a TV camera is recording them from a distance. It later airs on a tabloid show. At the end, Phil suggests that, since the world now thinks he's single, they continue their relationship in private.
38	12	"The Unseen Lever"	Jeremy Podeswa	Hart Hanson	1998
Marty's wife gets him a motor home for their anniversary. Twenty years before, he promised to quit his job on their 20th anniversary and travel to south America by motor home with her. To at least appear to placate her wishes, he takes a few days away from the firm to pretend to plan the trip with her. Sally refuses to allow Marty time off but he leaves anyway explaining that he needs the time to deal with a marital situation. Benny explains to the staff how when Marty was his underling, he promised her the Latin America trip after she caught him working on their honeymoon. Ian presents his successes with the airline to Adam and Sally and then announces that he wants to return to Gardner. Sally assigns him to Jack to help him with a beer company deal. Ian and Jack meet with Trudy Kelly to discuss a beer she has been marketing. Because a fungus-infected batch of the beer had previously been shipped, they suggest she change the brand name. While testing out Trudy Kelly's beer, Sally, Ian and Jack decide the beer should be targeted to women. After Sally's insistence, Jack tasks Ian with running the idea to market the beer to women by Trudy Kelly. When Ian pitches her, he angrily rejects the idea. They learn that she bought the brewery to shake off the perception that her products only appeal to women. That is the reason why she did not ask Sally to handle the deal. Sally later convinces Trudy to change the name of the beer and market it to women. In a sauna conversation, David Astin promises to let Gardner handle a large bank merger if Adam can persuade the Minister of Finance to allow it. At lunch later, Ian's mother suggests that if Adam successfully handles the large bank merger, it may clinch the U.N. appointment he wants and offers to help him. After she consults with the minister, she tells him that the minister will not allow a bank merger in the near future. In response, Adam decides to turn the bank's acquisition target to an insurance company instead. David is not interested in an insurance company merger until Trisha points out that their compatible computer systems would make the combination synergistic. Donald shows up at Marty's house to try to convince Marty to delay his departure. In his absence, Marty suggests Donald do something that will raise eyebrows as a career move so Donald tries to land an uncouth but very wealthy client named Noah. Noah suggests they meet for drinks later that evening and asks him to bring girls. If they get along well, Noah will invest $50M in Donald's mutual fund. After consulting with Jack, Donald realizes that Noah expects him to bring hookers. Ian suggests that he get two for Noah. With Grant's help, Donald finds and books escorts on the Internet. At the bar, Trisha hints that although Adam will not be doing a bank merger, he will do another large merger. Chris and Benny quickly figure out that he plans to merge the bank with an insurance company that he is on the board of directors. The following day, David shows up at Gardner angrily wanting to know why the securities commission has asked him to confirm that he has engaged Gardner on the life insurance company purchase. Meanwhile, the trading floor has begun buying the insurance company on the information they surmised from Trisha. When she admits to Adam that she was the leak, he tells her that she wasn't. He has the compliance officer put a different financial firm on the restricted list and warns her to be more discreet. Their decoy works but Adam learns that the chairman has been chosen Canadian ambassador to the United Nations since using a Canadian bank to handle the merger is seen as patriotic. Adam initially says he will not do the merger. He also learns that Ian's mother betrayed him. Marty warns Donald not to take Ziggy to a mutual fund industry event or else he will lose his position as fund manager. He then announces his intention to quit to Sally and Adam. Donald later tells Ziggy that he will not be attending the mutual fund event. Sally later goes to Marty's house to offer incentives for him to stay on. He rejects her offer but his wife agrees to let him continue to work if he gets his own bathroom. At the end of the episode, when Trisha finds Adam drunk and despondent in his office after hours, she successfully makes intimate advances toward him.
39	13	"The Sun and the Moon"	Alex Chapple	Ann MacNaughton	1998
Jean-Paul Brunet shows interest in participating as an investor in an airport deal in a former Soviet state. Oil companies investing heavily in the area are expected to require an airport. On Adam's advice, Jack approaches a wealthy Russian investor born in the former Soviet state to invest in the airport and receives a $10M commitment on the condition that no bribes are paid to government officials to get the airport built. To Adam's surprise, the Russian investor's involvement with the airport results in threats of sabotage from nationalists of the former Soviet state. When the investor learns of this, he responds that it is really the government of the former Soviet state that does not want him involved because they know he will not pay bribes to get the airport built but promises to withdraw from the project if Jack insists on it. Before leaving, he tells them that they will be asked to pay protection money to build the airport. Soon after, they are asked to do so. Adam and Sally decide to withdraw from the airport deal rather than be blackmailed. Jack asks Jean-Paul to protect the airport but he refuses to consider it since creating the need for his services by investing in a politically sensitive area would be seen as self-dealing. He also helps Jack rule out hiring a private security force for the airport since it would make the investment unprofitable. When Jack and Adam meet to discuss the status of the airport deal, Adam convinces Jack to pay the bribe but not tell the Russian investor that he is doing so. They later meet with him and lie about the government not extracting bribes from them. He leaves overjoyed thinking the government of the former Soviet state did not ask for bribes. Sally is approached by a fashion distribution company in need of expansion capital. During a visit with the fashion designer, Sally discovers a rift between the designer and the distributor. During a meeting with the fashion designer and the distributor, Sally angrily denies them financing after the two get into a heated argument. At a later meeting, the designer asks Sally to help him get his company back and ahe agrees to lend him enough money to buy back his brand from a company that had previously acquired his. Sally returns to her office after hours to find Phil inside. An argument between them turns physical leaving Sally with a black eye. When she later meets him at a house he bought for her, she learns that he is manic depressive but has been off medication for months. He asks her to confirm with his doctor. After Phil's constant urging, Sally finally talks to his doctor to learn that he is not violent but that the doctor has also refused to take him back as a patient unless he starts taking his prescribed medication again. Realizing Phil has no intention of taking the medicine, Sally breaks up with him. Sally recognizes Trisha's crush on Adam and warns him of the possible repercussions if he mishandles the situation.
40	14	"Two Steps Forward"	Peter Wellington (director)	Maureen McKeon	1998
Adam and Trisha's affair is in full swing but, feeling uncomfortable with it, he asks Sally to keep Trisha away from his office more and she does. Adam ends his relationship with Trisha leading her to resign emotionally. Ann is released from rehab. Adam and Sally still think it was a suicide attempt until she meets with them at the firm later to confess that she was a heroin addict. When they discuss the matter with the compliance officer, they learn that drug abuse is considered a disability so if they fire her, she can sue them. They are not required to give her the mutual fund manager position though. In a meeting to discuss Ann's future with the firm, they decide that she cannot head up the mutual fund. Jack asks Marty to consider Ann for the trading floor as a favor to him. Ann accepts Marty's offer to maker her a commodities trader. Donald has an asthma attack when he learns that he has become permanent fund manager. Senior members of the firm meet to determine annual bonuses. Corporate finance has had good year but the trading floor's bonus pool is smaller than the year before. When Ziggy later finds Chris and Benny in Sally's office looking for bonus information, she offers Sally's password if the two of them promise to get Marty to reexamine her for the commodities test. Angry about the decrease in their bonuses for the year, the trading floor later stops working forcing Marty to ask Sally and Adam to raise their bonuses. They promise to match whatever portion of his bonus he is willing to give up for his traders. Adam's political connection is likely to be promoted to Deputy Prime Minister. He asks Adam if his blind trust can be made to disappear. Adam agrees to help him in return for a different political appointment. The blind trust can be dismantled but there are several companies that profited enormously from decisions made by the politician and his cronies, thereby running afoul of Cabinet conflict of interest guidelines. To avoid being implicated in any wrongdoing that comes to light, Adam backdates the trust's inception date and changes the name of the person who started the fund from his to his deceased partner Cedric. In return, the politician hands Adam an order in counsel of appointment to a court. After a newspaper article exposes his underhanded dealings, the politician resigns from his post while Adam gets credit for providing the information that led to the politician's downfall. A friend of Sally's who has become a single mother via in vitro fertilization shows up at the firm looking for help with a diaper deal but due to her past record of quickly selling companies that she either founds or leads, Sally has reservations about her long-term commitment. She later decides not to hire her friend. Sally's old friend and former lover moves onto another idea so is no longer interested in a job at a Gardner Ross company. At the bar, in Ian's presence, her friend reveals that the two of them had an affair in college. He thinks it's hot.
41	15	"Retreat, But No Surrender"	Gord Langevin	David Barlow	1998
A minister of industry arrives at the firm to hear financing ideas for a new project but, uncomfortable with the less than professional work atmosphere, leaves without meeting with anyone. An event organizer tries to sell Sally on a weekend retreat for the firm's staff. The rest of the executive committee reject the idea until Sally tells Adam that the event organizer is close to the minister whose business they just lost. Adam agrees to go along as long as she agrees to redefine the managing partnership to give him more control if they cannot win back the minister. The rest of the firm is unwilling so Sally makes the retreat mandatory. To win Jack over, Sally offers to allow him to pitch his equity idea to the minister if they get him back as a client. Benny falls asleep during the first seminar. The event organizer tasks Adam and Sally with making dinner for everyone. Adam cooks a great meal but, as they were not told that food is limited, they will have to ration food for the rest of the weekend. They sleep in bunk beds but when the men discover they are short a bed, Chris offers to sleep outside if Benny gives him $200. While outside, Chris encounters Ziggy who is trying to find her way to Donald's room. She offers Chris $1,000 to get Donald out to the tent so they can spend the night together. Chris tells him she offered him $5,000 and Donald quickly agrees to pay. The next exercise is for the firm members to decide roles. They can either be sovereigns, knights or squires. They choose teams and spend the day playing team-building games together. After the day is over, firm members share candid insights with each other. On the second day, they play a war game that reveals everyone's character. At the end of it all, they argue over who won. When the squires from Adam's team say they would have preferred to be on Sally's team, the point of the exercise is revealed. Squires choose their knights who, in turn, choose their sovereigns. Within earshot of the consultant, Marty suggest that they buy shares in his company. When he then shows his appreciation for all that he learned over the weekend by offering a favor to the consultant. The consultant decides to open an account with him. Ian decides that he would prefer to work for Sally rather than Jack. Donald decides to give up the mutual fund. The minister returns to hear the firm's financing ideas.
42	16	"Joint Adventures"	David Straiton	Michael Teversham	1998
While Sally confronts Adam in the reception area over a deal of hers that he tried to poach, she starts to vomit. When the client later shows up at the firm, she learns that Adam had arranged for a meeting with him. Marty shows up to work with his son Randy, who has been suspended from school for taking the bake sale money and using it to trade. They suspended him for taking a commission on the trade. Thinking that the boredom of Marty's job would inspire Randy to do better in school, his wife forces Marty to take him to work. Instead, he takes an avid interest in the markets. On the second day, Marty starts teaching Randy how to trade. Randy's trades are profitable. Marty realizes his encouragement has gone too far when Randy decides to drop out of school to become a trader. Marty learns from the compliance officer that Randy took credit for Grant's trades. After an argument, Randy decides to try to get a job at another firm but Marty calls all of the other firms to ask them not to hire him. Donald is eager to buy into Gardner Ross Larkin venture capital. Jack and Donald try to find a way to get arena for a basketball team owner. After a meeting between their basketball team owner client and the owner of an indoor soccer team that owns land with the right zoning for an arena, their client refuses the deal because the soccer team owner is Italian. Jack then proposes they tie the deal in with a casino but their client doesn't like that idea either. When Donald comes up with a plan for a facility that can host sports and concerts, Jack has to reject it because entertainment facilities require special hearings and the facility needs to be built quickly. Donald finally confronts Jack with the fact that doing the deal with the soccer team owner is the only viable option and Jack agrees to try to convince their client. When Jack and Donald meet with the basketball team owner, they learn that she had bad dealings with Italians on two separate occasions in the past and fires them after Donald's persistence. Later, Jack accepts Donald as a partner even though Donald blew the deal. An examination finds an anomalous cyst on one of Sally's ovaries which will require immediate surgical removal. She warns Adam to stay away from her deal while she is in the hospital. Ian sees Adam in a meeting with the top purchasing officer for the Canadian Armed Forces. When Ian meets with Sally's client, he is unable to convince him that their deal is better than Adam's. Ian agrees. During conversation, Sally tells Ian that she might have cancer. Adam visits Sally in the hospital and admits that his government sources helped him present a better proposal to the client. He thinks that a combination of both deals is best for the client but refuses to lead the deal. The episode ends with a doctor telling Sally that the malignant tumor was fully removed but further tests must be done.
43	17	"End Games"	John L'Ecuyer	Graham Clegg, Maureen McKeon	1998
During an executive meeting, Sally announces the firm's participation in a hot aerospace issue and Adam announces that the Financial Post will name him businessman of the year. When Adam meets Trisha for lunch and learns that she is job hunting, he encourages her to apply for a market analyst position with Grant. Later, while waiting in his office, she discovers a new artifact on his shelf and realizes she is still seeing Ian's mother. She gets angry and storms out but returns later with her lawyer to file a sexual harassment suit. He decides to fight her in court even after Sally reminds him that he will lose his businessman of the year award if he does not settle privately. While preparing Adam for the deposition, the compliance officer learns that Grant might be able to help Adam's case. When asked, Grant confirms that Trisha seemed jealous. Briefly questioning Grant reveals that, despite his best intentions, he would be detrimental to Adam's case on a witness stand thereby forcing Adam to settle the lawsuit out of court for $2 million. Ian suggests to Donald that they branch out on their own with a merchant bank. They get Chris, who wants to run the floor, on board. Rising aluminum prices begin to hurt the aerospace company's prospects. Sally tasks a disinterested Marty to find out why. When Phil Hoagland's name appears on the list of suspects, she meets with him later and learns that he has no interest in aluminum. He only caused the market disruption to get her attention. In order to protect their aerospace client, the trading floor spends $40M and works overnight to stop the rise in aluminum prices. In response, Phil pulls out of the aluminum market but the following morning, the aerospace company begins having trouble buying the required lithium. Donald's initial research turns up no evidence that Phil is behind the shortage. Still unconvinced that Phil is not behind the lithium shortage, Adam suggests Sally leave the firm. When Sally and Adam tell the leader of the aerospace company of their suspicions of sabotage, he immediately suspects one of his rivals. When Adam meets with him to negotiate, Phil offers him one hundred times book value for his share of Gardner Ross but Adam declines. In order to figure out who is trying to sabotage the aerospace company, Donald approaches Grant to hack into the computer systems of the companies they are investigating but to his surprise, Grant has already done so. He then helps them show that Phil Hoagland's company is buying lithium through shell companies. Unfortunately, they do not have enough evidence to file a complaint with the competition bureau so Sally decides to leave to save Gardner Ross. Further research reveals that the lithium company has a major debt in one of its divisions. Gardner decides to buy the debt and foreclose. If Phil tries to buy the debt back, they will be able to nail him with market manipulation. If he doesn't, Gardner will own a lithium supplier. The firm sets Chris up to entrap Phil by posing as a wealthy orthodontist who has bought the debt of Phil's lithium company and record Phil trying to buy back the debt from him thereby giving Gardner enough evidence to pursue an antitrust suit against Phil. At the end, Sally meets with Phil at Gardner to tell him his actions were crazy and that they scared her.
44	18	"A Friend in Need"	Reid Dunlop	Ann MacNaughton	1998
Chris gets an unexpected visit from an attractive young woman from his hometown named Rachel but rudely blows her off but they meet later and the young woman from his hometown explains to Chris that she is in Toronto studying to be a teacher. The religious commune they both come from is paying for her tuition on the condition that she return there to teach for 5 years. Exposure to theories of evolution has made her doubt the religious teachings prevalent in the commune and she doesn't want to return home to teach things she no longer believes in. If she does not return to teach, she will be shunned by the commune so has found Chris to seek advice since he was shunned for having sex with a married woman from the same commune years before. Chris later gives Rachel money to help with her education and allow her the option of not going back to her hometown but advises her to go back anyway. When she hints at a possible relationship between the two of them, he rebuffs her. Jack, Joe Fitzpatrick and Jean-Paul Brunet get impatient with Graykirk Mining's stalling via its insistence on doing several assays before committing to development. Donald gets Gerald Graykirk to begin mine development if the results of the next assay are positive. Soon after, the price of the junior mining stock is drops. The prospector calls Jack to suggest that the large mining company investor is spreading rumors about the venture so he can buy more stock cheaply. Sally has inherited $5M from an aunt who never married or had children and begins thinking about ways to give back. Looking for a way to get more involved in charity, Sally meets with an abrasive friend of Ian's named George. Sally cuts a check for $250,000 to pay for breakfast and lunch for needy children on the condition that she be actively involved in serving them. When Marty sees the head of the mining company at Gardner, he realizes something must be wrong and sells off as much of the junior mining concern as he can as quickly as possible. In a meeting with Jack, Donald and the compliance officer, it is revealed that the assay came up dry. Knowing that the poor results will drag other unrelated mining stocks with African interests down with it, Marty spends the rest of the day shorting other junior mining stocks. Gardner Ross lost several million on the junior mining stock. During a meeting later, Marty divulges that the prospector sold 1.5 million shares. Jack receives a call from the prospector who is on site. He is drunk but accuses the large mining company of switching the samples. Jean-Paul offers to send some of his people to the prospective mine site to check for evidence of tampering but they soon learn that the prospector's airplane has gone missing after he had an argument with the big mining company's crew chief. The mercenary contributes resources to the search. In talking with Jack, Gerald reveals that someone has been stealing from his company's deposits. When the crew chief asked if anyone had offered him diamonds, the drunk prospector wanted to fight. Donald learns that Jean-Paul has been buying the mining stock ever since it crashed. Joe's airplane is later found but not his body. Jean-Paul gives Jack sworn statements from two workers who claim to have seen the prospector salt the samples. Jack suggests that the mercenary could have bribed the workers to make false statements and arranged for the prospector's disappearance. While Jack is absent from the executive committee meeting, Adam moves to sever Gardner's ties with the merchant bank arm that Jack runs and remove him from the executive committee but nobody supports him. At the end, Jack receives a letter from the prospector saying: "You'll be the first one I call if I find anything."
45	19	"The Whites of their Eyes"	Philip Earnshaw	Shelley Eriksen	1998
Looking for a stereo system for his son, Marty goes to the one man factory of an audiophile manufacturer named Stroud. Noticing that the owner has poor business skills, Marty tries to convince him to partner. After the manufacturer agrees, Marty immediately tries to sell his shares to Jack. After researching the company, Jack becomes interested in buying Marty's share out as long as Marty gets a stereo for his son. After Jack tells Marty he expects to increase Stroud's profits by 300–500%, Marty decides he wants to stay in. Marty convinces Stroud to give up 40% of his company. A competitor to Stroud that bought his previous company and forced him out is willing to pay $25 million for Stroud because they want a prestige subsidiary. They also invest in Gardner Ross Larkin as a silent partner, giving GRL an extra $50M in venture capital. When Marty finds out they have sold their share of Stroud to a company that had previously ripped off the owner, he has second thoughts. Stroud is hesitant about the deal proposal because the acquiring company put him out of business before. When he asks for Marty's advice, Marty covertly tells him to go with the original deal. After he leaves, Marty justifies his actions by saying that, even though Stroud would have made a lot of money on the deal, he would have lost his workbench. Adam lands a toll highway construction deal but due to the mining fiasco, the firm does not have the capital to underwrite the bridge loan so Adam must find a way of financing that does not require the firm's capital. He meets with David Astin who promises recommend Adam's proposal to their corporate finance department. Adam later meets with the Cancorp. banker to arrange for a bridge loan but the banker tells him that his bank will require collateral in order to extend it. Adam refuses to give him any part of the deal. Adam tries several other banks but none of them will give him a loan guarantee without a piece of the deal. The Bank Act prohibits mutual funds from making loans to banks but Adam pitches an idea to establish an independent capital pool that can legally take investments from mutual funds to a mutual fund manager that rejected his offer earlier. She likes his idea and decides to pursue it. David, having heard of Adam's independent capital pool idea, arranges a favorable bridge loan for the highway deal. Despite the potential ramifications, Adam decides to move forward with the independent capital pool. Donald invites Ziggy to attend his parents' 30th wedding anniversary. In hopes of impressing his family, she researches their forestry company. The following day, trading floor attempts to push the stock price of a timber company to the point where the company has more debt than equity. If the stock price falls below a certain level, they expect the debt holders to foreclose. Fearing that he took her advice. Ziggy is nervous because she advised Donald's father to buy the same company the night before. After the price of the forestry company starts to rise, Ann learns that Cancorp. is defending it. They hold its debt and don't want it to go under. Fearing that Donald's father is buying the forestry company like she suggested and knowing that the trading floor could lose millions if he is, she gets Donald to ask his father if D'Arby Forestry is buying the target. When they meet, Donald's father confirms that he is not buying the timber company. Ann calls the Cancorp. head trader to get him to stop defending the forestry company in exchange for some stock she has in inventory. Donald's father gives him pictures of Ziggy as a hooker given to him by a private detective from her home town. When Donald later shows Ziggy, she gets upset. Donald goes to his father to get the negatives of Ziggy as a hooker and to get them from the private detective that found them. When Donald tells Ziggy of his plans to destroy all evidence of her past, she explains that the pictures were a Halloween costume from high school. Ann defies Marty's limit to successfully down the timber company.
46	20	"Boom"	Stacey Stewart Curtis	Alyson Feltes	1998
Ann decides to go long Colombian cotton after the Colombian government announces they will provide seeds and start-up capital to cocoa growers but a landslide in Colombia soon hurts her cotton position. When Marty orders her to buy coffee futures to profit from a triad of disasters in Colombia, she has misgivings about profiting from disasters. She later arranges with the relevant authorities to pave the way for Mike's soy bean crop substitution. Tired of Ann taking up anti-drug causes on the trading floor, Marty arranges a meeting between the two of them and Adam in hopes that he can convince her to drop the causes and focus on making profitable trades. During the talk, Ann realizes that she will not find meaning in her work and decides to resign. Ann tells Jack she has signed on with the Canadian disaster relief contingent to Colombia. He responds angrily accusing her of running away from their relationship but, after she asks, he decides to hand over the merchant bank to Donald so he can go with her. The DEA announces a pilot project with Mike's genetically enhanced soybeans. Adam chairs a UN finance committee meeting in the Gardner Ross boardroom. Sally questions Adam after discovering that a numbered company he controls has transferred Old Montreal real estate leases to Gardner Ross. After Adam suggests they move the UN headquarters to Montreal, the French member of the UN finance committee supports the idea as long as France gets the credit for it. The American UN ambassador confronts Adam over his proposed plan to move the UN headquarters to Montreal and hands him a message from president's office stating that if the UN moves to Montreal the United States will not go with it. Adam's ploy works. They United States pays off its $1.5 billion UN outstanding debt obligation provided that the headquarters remain in Manhattan. Jack meets with a client who has pioneered a method of crossing soy beans with petunias with the result being soy beans more resistant to pesticides. Jean-Paul approaches Jack with a resort deal but Jack is uninterested. Jack pitches his client's super soybean to Jean-Paul as a cash crop for Colombia. Jean-Paul replies that any such move could be met with violent opposition from Colombia's drug cartel. Jack arranges a meeting between Mike, Jean-Paul and Ann. Ann is immediately interested in participating in a DEA program that might give Colombian farmers an alternative cash crop to cocaine but Jean-Paul warns that the drug cartels who control 70% of the arable land in Colombia may react violently to any crop substitution programs. Due to a $2M shortfall on the trading floor, Sally tells Adam she will need to collapse the escrow account on the bridge deal but Adam asks her not to and offers to make up the shortfall personally by putting up his Gardner Ross stock. When Sally threatens to collapse the account just to be vindictive, Adam explains why he wants to keep it open. Donald likes Jean-Paul's Ecuador deal but Jack is uninterested because he feels overextended in the Third World. Jack gives Ann an engagement ring before she gets into a limousine he has order for her. After the car travels a short distance down the street, it stops and the driver gets out and runs away from the vehicle before it blows up. Jack unsuccessfully tries to save her.
47	21	"In Toto"	Alex Chapple	Hart Hanson	1998
The episode begins with Ann's funeral. After the funeral, Jean-Paul tells Jack the police will make an arrest that day. Jack asks him to kill whoever is responsible for her death. Jean-Paul and a detective provide information to Jack about Ann's killer. Jean-Paul offers Jack a Cayman Islands-based CFO position with his private security firm. After Jack confronts the brother of the man convicted of killing Ann, he begins to think that he is the one they were trying to kill. He begins looking through all of his merchant bank deals to figure out who might want to kill him. The detective, who has the limousine company under surveillance, shows Jack pictures of him threatening the killer's brother and asks why he is threatening the killer's brother. He then gives Jack some of Ann's personal effects found in the limousine. Jack tells him he believes that it was not Ann they were trying to kill. After a brief tirade, the detective tells him to stand down. Jack then decides to take Jean-Paul's CFO offer. Chris finally shows emotion over Ann's death after Jack gives him the remains of a lighter Chris gave her. In the international media, after Jean-Paul's company gets blamed for violence in Africa, he disappears. After the detective tells Jack that Jean-Paul also had the limousine service that killed Ann on retainer, Jack begins to wonder whether it could just be a coincidence. Grant crawls into a vent and refuses to leave until Donald and Ziggy promise to find his birth mother. Ziggy and Donald find Grant's biological mother. During the meeting, Ziggy is very insensitive to Grant's birth mother who is not ready to meet the son she gave away for adoption sot hey don't tell Grant that they've found her. Chris later hires an aging hooker to pretend that she's Grant's mother so that he will start trading again. Believing that privatization can improve prisons, Adam takes on a prison privatization deal. When Ian ridicules his idea, he gets offended. Ian later apologizes to Adam for his earlier offensive behavior but Adam rejects it. Shaken by the mining company scandal and Ann's murder, the shareholder's representative meets with Sally to demand representation on the executive committee but Sally refuses. Phil warns Sally that a group of shareholders want to put a representative on the executive committee. If Sally does not agree, she will fight to put Adam in charge of Gardner Ross. As a result of their involvement with Jean-Paul, the firm is losing clients. In a meeting with Adam and Sally, Ian's mother insists that either Jack or Ann publicly take the fall for Gardner's involvement in Jean-Paul's company but Sally refuses to defame either of them. The three of them later meet with Jack to tell him they plan to shift some of the blame to Ann but he rejects that idea and asks them to blame him instead but Sally refuses. Adam, in turn, decides to announce his resignation at the next shareholder's meeting. Sally faces a hostile group of shareholders at the annual meeting. Phil supports her and Jack appears before the shareholders to take full responsibility for the firm's dealings with the private security firm. When it's Adam's turn to speak, he resigns but the shareholders rally for him to take over full control at the firm. Donald begins to consider Ian's idea to take over the Gardner Ross merchant bank.
48	22	"In Vacuo"	Alex Chapple	Hart Hanson	1998
While being interviewed on a financial television show, Marty makes remarks likely to put the firm under greater securities commission scrutiny before getting into a confrontation with the host and assaulting him. Floor activity is dead because nobody wants to trade with Gardner so Marty makes a deal with another broker to execute Gardner's trades through their floor. During an executive committee meeting, they decide that Jack should be removed from the executive committee meeting and Sally proposes they find a White knight (business). Adam and Sally meet with the David Astin to discuss a purchase of Gardner by Cancorp. Sally proposes a 3 to 1 stock swap. The chairman's successor is weak and is expected to be replaced in the coming months. Since the chairman promised to promote from within at the last annual general meeting, if he buys Gardner Ross, he can promote Adam to chairman after the merger. Adam and Sally agree to the deal with Cancorp. Jack gets Cathy and Grant to research all transactions between the merchant bank and the private security firm. He then hands Donald control over Gardner's merchant bank. In a discussion with Jack, Jean-Paul claims that the media reports about his company are untrue and says that because his company's reputation is shot, he is losing clients quickly he will need to fold the company and restart under a new name. When he offers Jack the CFO position again, Jack accepts. Cathy and Grant soon figure out that Jean-Paul has been using Gardner to launder money. They also figure out that Jack has been made director of many of Jean-Paul's shell companies, effectively framing Jack for laundering his money. Cathy and Benny decide to get married. Cathy asks him to quit trading and help her with a car servicing business she manages. Despite Sally's objections, Jack and Adam decide that Jack should take Jean-Paul's money. When Jean-Paul asks for it back, Jack will return if he collapses the bogus subsidiaries linking his money laundering to Gardner Ross. They avoid calling the police because, if they do, everything will become public record and they will lose the bank. While Jack is transferring Jean-Paul's money, he sister suggests he take it for himself. She then announces her plans to marry Benny and asks him to give her away. The Lifeshock executive decides that, due to its involvement with the mercenary firm, he doesn't want Gardner to handle his deal. In a bid to survive the turmoil, Adam suggests to Donald and Ian that he take the Lifeshock IPO to Cancorp. and set the three of them up as a separate division. Realizing that Cancorp. will uncover the money laundering during due diligence immediately, Adam and Sally meet with David to tell him the acquisition deal is off. After David storms away from the two of them, Adam privately offers him the Lifeshock IPO. In a meeting with Ian and Donald, the Lifeshock founder suggests the two of them do the deal without Gardner Ross. When Donald and Ian tell Adam they are leaving him out of the deal, he banishes them from the firm. At the end of the working day, the firm is stormed by securities commission staff who hold all Gardner Ross employees at the firm until their investigation is complete. Knowing that Jack's involvement will surface during the investigation and refusing to let him to try to shoulder the blame for the money laundering alone, Sally calls Phil for help. She then announces that Phil will buy the bank and she will take a leave of absence for health reasons, causing the securities commission to halt the investigation. Adam is furious that Sally made the decision without him. When they meet at a restaurant after he realizes Jack has taken his money, Jean-Paul admits that he used Jack to launder money. Figuring out that Jean-Paul had Ann killed to keep him from going to Colombia with her, Jack follows him outside and pummels him. After being blackballed by all of the other firms on the street, Marty's wife finds him on the floor making trades with a dead phone line. After Cathy and Benny's wedding, Jack tells her he will be leaving to live the life of Riley as she suggested.

=== Season 4 (1998–99) ===
No. overall	No. in season	Title	Directed by	Written by	Original release date
49	1	"Reap the Whirlwind"	John L'Ecuyer	Peter Mitchell	October 15, 1998
The season begins with Marty, who has been missing work, having a nightmare. The firm's name has been changed to Gardner Ross Cunningham (GRC). Marty is at home because the trading floor has not reopened amid rumors that Phil plans to close it permanently but Phil keeps the trading floor opened after Adam threatens to leave if he closes it. The trading floor reopens with speeches from Marty, Adam and Phil. Despite Marty's protests, Phil moves an attractive young trader name Niko Bach to the trading floor from his company. When Niko doesn't trade for the first day, Marty harasses her. Jean-Paul has been killed and Jack is a prime suspect. Sally has left the firm. When a detective questions Adam about Jack's whereabouts, Adam gives him Sally's phone number. Phil tries to lure Sally back to the bank but she refuses because she needs time away from him and the banking industry. Sally arrives at home to find Jack there. He explains that he killed Jean-Paul on purpose but, despite her pleas, refuses to turn himself in. Their talk is interrupted by the police who are searching for Jack who flees when they arrive. The following day, Sally returns home to find a detective waiting for her. After he tells her that Jean-Paul's head was severed with a 6-inch knife, she realizes that Jack did not kill him. Despite Adam's protests, Phil tells him to meet with Ian and Donald to get the Lifeshock IPO back. Adam offers Ian and Donald a healthy commission if they allow GRC to lead the Lifeshock IPO. Donald argues that the client wants to do the deal with them and not GRC but Adam counters that it's in the best interests of the client's company to do the deal with GRC. Adam also makes it clear that he is interested in Lifeshock and not the two of them returning to the firm. Phil later promises to let Ian return to GRC if Ian can bring Lifeshock back with him. Ian stipulates that he will accept if he can lead the deal, sit on the executive committee and if Donald is bought out of the deal fairly. When asked by Ian why he is so interested in Lifeshock, Phil says the product would have saved his father's life. When Adam threatens to disallow Ian's return, Phil threatens to call David Astin. He also brings a new banker named Paul Deeds to the firm, appoints him to the executive committee, tells Adam to mentor them and warns Adam not to disrupt them. When Jack goes to his gym, he finds his locker unlocked because the police opened it earlier and emptied its contents. While there, a friend of his recommends someone who can forge passports so he can leave the country. Sally hires a private investigator to find Jack.
50	2	"No Fixed Address"	TW Peacocke	Graham Clegg	October 22, 1998
Grant has been sleeping with the hooker that Chris hired to pretend to be his biological mother. The traders later figure out that Grant is paying the hooker and not Chris or Marty. When Marty and Chris tell Grant to stop sleeping with the hooker that Chris hired to pretend to be his mother, they learn that he knows she's not his mother but considers her a girlfriend. Ian and Paul reject a telecommunications deal that Adam suggests. Chris has been showing discontent with his current position as a currency trader. Since the introduction of the Euro, the importance and potential profitability of his position as currency trader has diminished. Marty offers to let Chris transfer if Chris makes a profit acting as head trader for the day. With Chris as head trader, the floor barely makes a profit for the day but still gives him the transfer he bet Marty for. Chris chooses to trade commodities but hints at his intention to take over Marty's job. Donald accepts a VP position at an investment bank in London and asks Ziggy to go with him but she decides not to go. Jack gets a new passport under a new identity. He soon contacts Grant to help him move $175M of Jean-Paul's money into an account in Turks & Caicos. Grant is reluctant at first but helps him. When asked, Jack tells Grant that he killed Jean-Paul. Adam meets with a headhunter who has received many board offers for him from many other companies but Adam rejects them. Later, Adam meets with the chairman of Cancorp. for career advice. David advises him to stay in the game if he still has ambition. After a bartender tells her that personal finance scares her, Sally begins contemplating teaching people about personal finance as a charity avenue. Sally soon starts teaching classes on personal finance as a volunteer. Jack visits Donald to say goodbye and ask for a little cash. Adam proposes that they establish a retail division to help place issues like one Ian is currently working on. When Adam tells him of the plan to establish a retail division, Marty likes the idea so the trading floor can dump its mistakes on retail clients. While trying to flee, Jack is apprehended by the police.
51	3	"Killer Instinct"	John L'Ecuyer	Shelley Eriksen	October 29, 1998
A highly successful music industry entrepreneur named Fatty Size and his entourage shows up at the firm to meet with Ian. Coming from difficult backgrounds, their first meeting is a bit difficult. Fatty wants to start a mutual fund with $20M in seed money. Ian likes the mutual fund idea but Paul and Adam express reservations. A meeting between the executive committee and Fatty is arranged. Adam and Paul express their reservations over the potential size of the fund. Anticipating this, Ian shows up a little late with Jamaican food from a successful restaurant chain as an example of a business the mutual fund could invest in. Both Adam and Paul leave the meeting more receptive to Fatty's mutual fund idea. Paul later expresses reservations over the mutual fund to Adam and tells him that if it fails, he does not want to be in any way responsible but Adam likes the fund's potential to raise GRC's profile and possibly bring in more business. Ian suggests that Fatty take his record label public but Fatty refuses, saying that he prefers the autonomy of keeping it private. Sally asks Adam to be present at Jack's bail hearing. She also hires a lawyer for Jack, visits him in jail and tells him that, since Jean-Paul was killed when someone cut his head off with a knife, Jack is not responsible for his death. Adam shows up at the bail hearing but a hostile judge sets bail at $1M anyway. Jack's rejects his lawyer's proposal to plead guilty to a manslaughter charge. Not wanting to spend 3 years in jail, Jack later calls Sally to tell her he will jump bail and promises to make it up to her. Niko suspects that the president of a small, oil-producing country is dead but his death has not been announced to the general public yet. Thinking that buying resources might be a good way to play the situation, she pitches her idea to Marty who loudly rejects it. At the end of the trading day, Marty blows his stack when he discovers that Niko went with her hunch about the president being dead and set up positions to profit from it. Later in the evening, after Niko's suspicions prove correct and positions profitable, Marty asks her to explain how she knew the president was dead and she does. Ian visits Sally at her volunteer personal finance workshop to ask her to look at some proposals he's considering. When Ian stops by Sally's house to drop the proposals in her mailbox, she is still up and invites him in. They drink, talk and wind up in bed together. In the morning, she makes it clear that she does not want it to be the beginning of a relationship. Jack arrives in Turks and Caicos.
52	4	"I'll Sleep When I'm Dead"	David Straiton	Peter Mitchell	November 5, 1998
The episode begins with Jack partying with two hookers on an expensive boat he's purchased. The following day while on the beach, Jack meets an attractive local woman named Martha who runs a property development and suspiciously knows a lot about him. He later visits the property developer to discuss investing in one of her projects. Jack decides to invest in his new friend's development as a silent partner. Over dinner, Jack commits to a $4M investment in Martha's project. The two quickly become intimate and spend the night together. While they are together, Martha gets a phone call with news that the government has decided to pull out of her deal, Jack offers to make a larger investment in the project. When Jack goes to his bank in Turks and Caicos to get the money to invest in Martha's company, he learns that Sally has gotten Grant to transfer the money back to her. A detective shows up at Sally's class and threatens to charge her with aiding and abetting Jack's flight. She responds by threatening to complain of police harassment. When she returns to the class, she proposes to her students that they pool their funds to invest in the stock market together. At the next class, Sally comes up with $5,000 to invest in stocks. She asks them to think about which companies they want to buy. Ziggy is accepted to University of Toronto's MBA program. When Ziggy is unsure of whether to attend business school due to the high cost, Ian suggests she try to get the firm to pay for it. When she approaches him, Marty laughs at Ziggy's request for a letter of recommendation for the firm to pay for her MBA. When Ziggy asks him for help more seriously later, Marty seriously replies that he will not help her but when she later asks the executive committee if the firm will sponsor her MBA studies, Adam agrees to it. Even after Ziggy has received a commitment from GRC to pay for her MBA, Marty further discourages her from studying. Adam and the head of another investment bank come to an agreement on the purchase of the retail division of their bank. At an executive meeting, Adam and Paul argue over which retail firm to buy. Each has their own preference but Ian is more interested in setting up a mutual fund. A banker from Cancorp sees Adam meet with someone from the retail firm Paul wants to buy and immediately calls David Astin. On the floor later, Niko detects buy activity on the retail firm Paul wants to buy. When Marty tells him, Paul immediately orders Marty to buy stock below a certain level. When they consult Ian, he decides they won't be buying. When Adam returns to his office, he learns that the head of the retail firm has heard that he plans to buy the firm Paul wants and is angry about it. The executive committee decide on Adam's pick for the retail arm. Paul soon realizes that Adam sank his deal. At the end of the episode, Martha, who is an operative of Jean-Paul's company unable to recover money for the mercenaries shoots and kills Jack.
53	5	"The Old Man and the CEO"	Reid Dunlop	Jennifer Cowan	November 12, 1998
During a date with her, Grant's hooker Amber tries to leave to meet with another client until he pays her more to stay but after Grants sees her with another client, his perception of her and their relationship change. Grant's relationship with Amber later ends after he tells her he wants to continue seeing her but doesn't want to pay her anymore. An old friend of Adam's named Leo Baker tries to pitch him on a Montreal revitalization project but due to the heavy capital requirements and Quebec's political situation, Adam is skeptical and refuses to invest in his developer friend's project instead offering to sell him some properties he owns in Montreal. In a meeting later, Ian and Paul ridicule Adam's proposal that the bank invest in the Montreal revitalization effort. Adam and Leo present their development plan to the mayor of Montreal who seems receptive to their plan. After asking for his discretion during their meeting, Adam later learns that the mayor has publicized the development project for Montreal after Leo asked him a question about it during a press conference. The mayor later assures Adam that his conditions will be met. When Leo enters the meeting late, along with other bizarre behavior, he introduces himself to the mayor even though they had already met. Fatty, who has had poor previous dealings with them, rejects a rival black owned record label that Ian wants to invest fund holdings in. Later, Adam and Paul press Ian to convince Fatty to invest in his rival's company. After Ian makes it clear that he needs to be in full control of the fund including which companies it invests in, Fatty relents on not allowing the fund to invest in his rival. Ian becomes upset when Fatty Size later tells him that his rival has been charged with tax evasion. Still looking for ways to invest fund holdings, Ian finds several companies that might be considered racially progressive but Fatty dismisses all of them. After Ian implies that he is being unreasonable, Fatty relents. Sally tells class that she will trust Marty to invest in blue chip for her but they want to meet him in person. Marty immediately ignores Sally's instructions to buy blue chip stock and invests her students' money in an Internet startup, even betting that he can double the amount in 3 days. The Internet startup Marty invested Sally's students' money in gets busted for growing marijuana, thereby losing their money in one day. Sally becomes concerned about when neither her nor Grant has heard from Jack so she dispatches her private investigator to Turks & Caicos. Sally begins investing the money she took from Jack as if it were her own. While Sally is confronting Marty over his trading in futures for her student's fund instead of blue chip stock as she requested, she receives word that Jack has been killed. This upsets Grant when he finds out and nearly assaults Sally. Sally is careful not to tell Adam that she took Jack's money.
54	6	"The Falcon and the Showman"	Randy Bradshaw	Paul Aitken	November 19, 1998
The episode begins with Fatty and the executive committee watching a promotional for the new mutual fund. Fatty gets annoyed with Adam's sarcasm and leaves the meeting. Sally's class is ecstatic when they learn that Marty has tripled their investment. When one of her students tell her someone has been arrested for Jean-Paul's murder, she is so overcome with emotion that she has to leave the classroom. Enchanted by the quick profits Marty earned them in futures trading, Sally's class pushes her to buy newsprint futures. Sally instructs Chris not to buy newsprint futures but wants her class to think that she made the order. The price of newsprint drops $5 during the day. When Sally's class tells her they would have preferred to lose the money, she ends her volunteer work. Fearing that he may have health problems, Adam questions Leo's ability to do the Montreal deal. During a meeting with a potential investor, Leo stops talking in mid-speech. Concerned about Leo's ability, Adam insists that he get a physical check-up. After catching the Maitre D' from a private club pretend to be a doctor giving Leo a clean bill of health, Adam visits his wife and finds out that Leo has Alzheimer's disease. Leo's wife assures him that he can do the deal with Adam's help. Adam tells Leo that they can either let the proposed development die or Leo can take a back seat. The investor they met with earlier is on board. The mutual fund sellers are resistant to Fatty's fund until Ian offers them a list of prospective buyers and outlines the promotional plan. A popular Reverend appears at Fatty's club to congratulate him on the fund but later on at a press conference, the same Reverend who congratulated Fatty on the mutual fund the night before criticizes the fund for investing in companies that do not have enough black leadership or ownership possibly killing support for the fund from the black community. Ian pulls strings to have the Reverend's comments edited out of Fatty's press conference media coverage. Sally meets with Adam to discuss some projects she has been approached with. Chris offers to help Ziggy in return for sexual favors. Grant returns to the firm with a more serious demeanor, goes into his closet office, hurls the copy machine from the office and slams the door shut. Sally attempts to make amends but Grant, still angry, asks her never to speak to him again. Marty reams Ziggy out for sneaking away to study while at work. Ziggy later figures out that two companies are planning to merge by researching likely domain names for the combined entity that have recently been registered. Sally meets with someone who advises her on how to launder the money she took from Jack.
55	7	"Six Degrees of Duplicity"	Reid Dunlop	David Young (Canadian playwright)	November 26, 1998
Chris gets a visit from Rachel, a girl from his hometown who he had helped through school the previous year. She is there to tell Chris that his father wants to buy some land from Chris. He rudely blows her off. Adam rejects a proposal from a company that manufactures fertilizer from human waste. Chris approaches Paul to tell him that he has 80 acres of land that the human waste fertilizer company can buy from him. After hearing that Chris grew up in a religious community that shuns technology and the outside world, Niko takes an interest in him. Phil tells Sally that a Swiss firm has approached him to buy GRC and wants to know how she would feel about him selling the firm. Sally does not object to the deal and offers Phil some advice on how Adam might react to it. Sally relays the information Phil gave her to Adam but claims she heard it in Europe. Adam is angry to hear the rumor but later agrees to go along with Phil's sale of the bank on the condition that the acquiring firm buy half of his share of the bank at the price Phil gets now and the other half at a fixed minimum if he leaves the bank in 2 years. Sally later reveals to Adam that the Swiss buyer of an 80% share of the bank is actually a shell company controlled by her. During an executive meeting, Sally outlines her road map for the firm now that she controls it. When Paul immediately calls Phil to tell him he sold the bank to Sally, he realizes she suckered him. Phil interrupts a meeting between Sally and some clients she poached from him to confront her over her stealth purchase. Assuming he would be fired under Sally's ownership, Paul hands in his resignation but she offers him a place at GRC and he accepts. Niko also packs up to leave but Marty offers her a chance to stay and she accepts. Partially due to Leo's sickness, Adam is having a difficult time putting the Montreal deal together. Hoping to prevent any further mistakes, Adam convinces Leo to allow Ian to help out with the Montreal project. Since Ian's family is well-known in Montreal, Adam asks him to host a reception for the advisory board. Ian agrees to use his family name only if he gets equal billing on the deal. Adam refuses him but agrees to put his name on the prospectus and guarantees him a bonus. With Chris out of the office helping Paul on the human waste fertilizer deal and Ziggy writing midterms, Marty is short staffed so he grabs an employee that he doesn't know and puts her on the trading floor to help. The employee that Marty put on the trading floor uses considerable sexual innuendo to flirt with other traders at other houses and makes some successful trades as a result. When Marty tries to get the new girl back to the trading floor, he discovers that she is actually in charge of the plants and has no interest in trading. While visiting his farmland, Chris tells Paul of how he grew up plowing fields without the use of mechanical farm equipment, not having electricity, not being allowed to listen to music or watch television. It is revealed that Paul is religious. While there, an elder from the community approaches Chris to ask if he has reconsidered returning to the town. Rachel later pleads with Chris not to sell his land to a human fertilizer company to no avail. Chris cannot sell his land to the human excrement factory because the deal will return to Phil's firm. Grant voices his disapproval at how Sally used money they took from Jack to buy back the firm.
56	8	"Blood on the Floor"	Philip Earnshaw	Shelley Eriksen	December 3, 1998
The episode begins with Sally at a lab that has created artificial blood. Sally later announces the new blood substitute deal to the executive committee and asks Paul to lead it but aberrations in lab expenses at the artificial blood start-up spook Sally. When Sally and Paul press their contact at the biotech company, she admits that an aberration in lab expenditures one year was caused by a technician who had mad cow disease. While the lab was not the cause of his condition, they did have to spend the money on purification technology and the medical insurance company covered his treatment prompting a rise in insurance rates afterward. During an executive meeting discussion of the artificial blood deal, Ian offers to introduce Paul and Sally to a large potential investor who might buy the whole issue. Ian's large investor is a black man who owns a courier company. The health minister who has assured Sally that there will not be delays in approvals for the artificial blood products resigns. Since the biotech firm planned to issue debt to finance the clinical trials, they have to consider other alternatives since any investor would be unwilling to extend debt to a company that does not have a product and could face regulatory delays getting one to market. Sally suggests that they set up in an African country where they are likely to get regulatory approval quickly. Marty gets a tip about an asthma biotech company from someone who works in a lab supplier that has shipped a large quantity of mice to them. The asthma biotech stock Marty was tipped off on rises quickly after the expected clinical trial announcement occurs. Marty learns that the person who tipped him off was fired. When Marty opens a courier delivery, a box full of mice falls apart they scamper all over the trading floor causing chaos. Marty uses a fire extinguisher to kill them. Niko and Chris bet that whoever has the best trading idea wins. If Niko loses, she has to wear tasteless stockings and stilettos to his house but if she wins, he has to wear the traditional garb of the religious community he is from to his father's house. Niko shows up at Chris's house later to tell him she thinks he won their bet. Since she is not wearing the tacky stilettos and heels so he does not let her in. During a meeting, Ian invites Leo to a reception at Adam's home. For fear of what he might say due to his Alzheimer's, Adam hadn't told Leo about the reception. Ian's mother crashes the party and confronts Adam over his use of her family name to promote the Montreal project. Adam confides to Sally that Leo has Alzheimer's and can sometimes be a liability to the Montreal project. Adam visits Leo at his home and tells him in private that while Leo's reputation made the Montreal project fly, his sickness could shoot if out of the air. Adam asks him not to attend any meetings or have any communication with other partners. Leo acquiesces. Ian meets his mother later to make amends but when he tells her of how he persuaded the courier company owner to invest in the biotech company, she gets angry because the client also deals with her. When Adam is about to host a meeting with a potential investor at his home, having forgotten that they agreed Leo should not have any contact with investors, he shows up expecting to participate. During the presentation, Leo zones out and starts singing. Privately, Leo admits that he intentionally crashed the meeting because he thought he would be able to help with the potential investor since he knows her. Leo's wife asks that they name part of the project after Leo and Adam agrees. Chris was away from the floor for the day to begin building a strip club on his inherited land as a way to get back at his religious parents. Ian tells Sally that his mother caused the health minister's resignation. Adam advises him to resolve his differences with his mother. At the end, the beginnings of an affair between Chris and Rachel is hinted at.
57	9	"Little Monsters"	Gary Harvey	Graham Clegg	December 17, 1998
Adam receives an assurance from a financial institution of their intent to underwrite the Montreal real estate development project. He notes that there are a few small businesses that need to be expropriated before the construction can begin but learns that some of the buildings are owned by a biker gang. Adam meets with the leader of the motorcycle gang regarding the properties the gang is reluctant to sell. He threatens to build around the biker gang's clubs if they do not sell. The biker replies that either GRC incorporate them into the plan or neither party gains anything. Later on, after learning that their activities have become borderline legal over the past 5 years, Adam realizes that expropriating their properties would take a long time and decides to form a limited partnership with the biker gang. Adam comes to an agreement with the bikers but the other investors in the Montreal project are not pleased with the biker gang's involvement and call a meeting between the syndicate and the leader of the biker gang. At a meeting between establishment syndicate members and the bikers, Adam overcomes the syndicate members' resistance by making reference to underhanded deals each of them, including him, has made. After Marty unsuccessfully tries to talk his son Randy out of starting as a trader at another firm, he hires him to work at GRC. Marty fears that Randy will be targeted if other traders know he is his son. Before leaving for lunch, Marty gives his son $200k to trade with and immediately calls traders from other firms on the street with instructions to attack him. With the commodities desk suspiciously busy, Randy realizes that his father attempted to set him up for failure. Marty returns to the floor to find that Randy has made a profit but created several enemies on the street. Randy learns that, when he was much younger, his father once called in a bomb threat to make a record one day profit after the traders had left their desks. The fire alarm goes off and everyone leaves the trading floor. Chris and Niko slip into a room to have sex. Before leaving, Marty locks the computers so they cannot be accessed. After everyone has left, Randy, who has tripped the alarm, sneaks onto the floor to execute some trades that his father would not allow but in unable to since all of the computers are locked. Marty fires him. At the executive committee meeting, Ian presents a company that has developed an artificial intelligence method to simulate curiosity. Grant is excited about Ian's artificial intelligence deal. Ziggy uses ideas from the artificial intelligence company Ian is working with for a school paper but one of Ziggy's classmates takes the artificial intelligence idea to another firm. Ian figures out that Ziggy leaked the artificial intelligence company project information to her MBA class causing GRC to lose the deal and asks Sally to speak with her. Ziggy is fired from GRC and expelled from the MBA program after admitting that she leaked information on the artificial intelligence company. She confronts her classmate who reveals he got a $100,000 bonus for landing the deal for the investment bank where he works. Sally tasks Paul with finding an alternative use for 27 single hull tankers owned by a Halifax company. They Paul independently come up with an idea to use the oil tankers to ship freshwater to countries around the world but the federal government disapproves of Paul and Sally's idea to ship freshwater. After a glass with ice cubes falls in Sally's lap while they are talking, she comes up with the idea to ship icebergs instead of freshwater. Sally and Paul hire an expert who confirms the feasibility of the exporting icebergs. Sally and Paul's conversion of oil tankers into water transport ships is a go. Sally hires Justine, one of the students from the investment club where she taught as a volunteer. The episode ends with the bikers taking Adam for a ride around the block on their bikes.
58	10	"Spin Cycles"	David Straiton	Peter Mitchell	December 24, 1998
A baby food manufacturing client of GRC's is suspected in the death of a baby. If the company goes down, GRC will lose $7M. Adam asks Paul to delay the IPO of another food company because GRC would be seen as abandoning its baby food manufacturer if it finances another food company while the baby food manufacturer is under investigation. Sally hires a public relations expert to minimize the damage. Fearing that a causal connection will be made if it is revealed that several babies that got ill recently were using the baby formula of the baby food manufacturer, Sally, Adam, the PR expert and the leader of the baby food company prepare for the outcome of the coroner's report. The coroner's office reports that the baby died of botulism traced to the baby food manufacturer's product. During a conference call, they try to calm investor fears but the CEO of the company veers off topic. Sally threatens to stop supporting him as a client and tells the CEO to order trading of the stock halted. The CEO suspects the union head is trying to sabotage the company out of revenge. They push the CEO to take responsibility and order a total product recall before the government does. The trading floor notices suspicious buying activity on the baby food company after the halt is lifted. They learn that 5 of the 8 babies have been released from hospital but just as things start to look up, they learn of another death. This time, the product came from a unionized plant throwing doubt on the sabotage theory. Suspecting that GRC is withholding her company's IPO to bolster confidence in the baby food company, an executive from the food company Paul is leading the IPO on pulls GRC off her IPO. Suspicious because the American market consumes 50,000 bottles of its baby food each day with only one death and no illnesses, GRC hires a private investigator to do a full background check on the mother of the baby who died. They then decide to hire an independent testing agency to do a full health and safety of all baby food plants and also test random case lots of the baby food. Soon after, they learn that the government has ordered that brand of baby food pulled from store shelves. Adam, Sally and the PR consultant then try to decide on how much to compensate the affected families. An investigation into the American death reveals that the mother probably stuffed the baby food down her child's throat after death. GRC forces the CEO of the baby food company to allow the Port Moody plant to be unionized since that is where the problems were originated. Marty has a block buyer for the baby food company so GRC decides to sell some of their stake. The CEO announces to the press that the problem originated from a cooling vat in the Port Moody plant that wasn't properly sterilized. When the union leader shows up, Sally and Adam offer a 3-year countrywide deal for his union that he promises to recommend to his members. When the CEO walks in during negotiations and threatens to get bridge financing elsewhere so he won't have to unionize the plant, Adam threatens to hurt him financially. Paul is unhappy about his reputation being damaged by Adam and Sally delaying his IPO. The traders complain about poor coffee since Ziggy's firing. Ziggy starts at a day trading firm. She loses big when she doesn't sell stock in the baby food company before market close. Making it worse, some of the money was borrowed from a friend. Later, Ziggy's baby food company position looks better as the price starts to rise and makes enough profit for her to pay back her classmate.
59	11	"Sour Grapes of Wrath"	Gord Langevin	Jennifer Cowan	December 31, 1998
At the bar, a trader friend of Marty's named Doug asks him for a job so Marty gives him one. On his first day, Doug immediately tries to hit on Niko. She later sees Doug violating the Chinese Wall by snooping around Paul's desk and confronts him. Doug trades in a resource stock after seeing information about the company in the corporate finance area of GRC. Pretending to be working on behalf of a client, Rachel buys back the resource stock that Doug bought. Suspicious of his snooping, Niko and Marty ask Paul to check into the reason why Doug was dismissed from his previous employer. After repeatedly trying to throw away the plant she got for him, Grant tells the plant girl he doesn't want the plant she gave him. Seeing that she is upset that he rebuffed her gesture, he later fishes the plant out of the garbage where she dumped it. Marty discovers that Doug was fired at his previous firm for Front running and fires him. When Marty asks him why he wasn't suspended by the securities commission, Doug replies that he was sleeping with the married woman who investigated him. The plant girl sees Grant giving food to squeegee kids and takes an interest in him. When she mentions Grant's actions to him, he denies doing it. Grant later finds a present from the plant girl on his desk and removes it. Grant later asks the plant girl out for dinner. While Sally and Paul are discussing financing options for a vineyard, the owner angrily bursts into their office complaining about decisions made by a vineyard that he mostly owns but does not control due to a two-tiered voting structure. Sally suggests he divest the vineyard but he refuses. She decides to talk to the object of his rant alone. When Sally visits the vineyard, she learns that the owner has a substandard crop of Chardonnay that he does not want to bottle under his name. The vineyard client has gone to the vineyard he owns but does not control to try to force it into production and is charged with trespassing. Sally tries to convince the vineyard owner to produce wine. During the meeting, his daughter suggests the grapes are good enough for production. Afterward, Sally encourages his daughter to be more assertive. Sally arranges a meeting between her vineyard client and the father and daughter of the vineyard her clients owns nonvoting stock in. She offers to buy 51% of the voting shares at a premium to the current trading price. The father refuses the offer and leaves the meeting. Sally meets with the daughter of the family-owned vineyard and suggests either pushing for the right to vote the shares in his trust or initiate a competency hearing. She warns that her father's decisions might bankrupt the family if she doesn't. The vineyard owner's daughter threatens to sue her father if he does not allow her to put out a less exclusive vintage. After learning that one of the main financiers of the Montreal project plans to divert funds to a mall in Texas, Adam and Ian meet with the fund manager to say they will fight the decision. After a board meeting vote, the Quebec financial institution decides they will put up 40% or $200M of the original commitment. Adam asks a Quebec trust that has already committed $40M to co-lead the Montreal project. When Adam announces the Quebec trust as co-lead, the board of the large financial institution votes again to fully commit to the project. After encountering difficulties contacting his wife, Marty gets suspicious and soon leaves the office to find out where his wife is. When he finds her at the tennis club, he gives her a cell phone so he can more easily find. When he asks her, Marty's wife denies having an affair. The episode ends with hints of Barb's infidelity.
60	12	"The Last Good Deal"	Reid Dunlop	Shelley Eriksen	January 7, 1999
While Marty is reaming the other traders out for being down in a bear market, Grant walks away from the floor laughing. On the floor later, Niko goes against Marty's trading ideas and the rest of the traders follow. Angry at having his authority undermined by Niko, Marty leaves the floor early and has a conniption while alone in the elevator. Sally and Adam both hear pitches from oddball prospects. They later revisit a potential client that they had rejected before who is developing a cruise ship with long-term rental units. They suggest that he use a REIT as a financing tool. Adam and Sally propose merging both the long-term rental cruise ship company and a resort chain that they know is overextended financially into a REIT. Both parties agree. When it becomes apparent that the resort owner and the cruise ship owner cannot not work together, Adam and Sally decide to hire a manager for the REIT so each of the two can manage their respective businesses. After working hand in hand to complete the merger between the resort and cruise ship, Adam and Sally act like best friends until Adam sees Ziggy on the trading floor. Disagreeing with her rehiring, Adam and Sally go right back to their contentious relationship. Grant hires an agent named Lana to negotiate his new contract. Marty wants Ziggy back but both Sally and Adam outrightly refuse Marty's request to hire Ziggy back. Paul starts on a body armor deal. Paul is hesitant to commit to the body armor deal due to feared quality issues with vests made in Mexico. After a Mexican cop is killed while wearing one of the vests, the Mexican government seizes the Mexican assets of the armored vest maker. Having lost confidence as a result of suffering losses on the body armor deal, Paul calls his previous employer. When Grant gets Sally's signature on his new contract, he uses his knowledge of her having taken money from Jack as leverage to get Ziggy back.
61	13	"Eat the Loss"	Michael DeCarlo	Paul Aitken	January 14, 1999
Having discovered a malignant cyst on her other ovary, Sally chooses chemotherapy over a complete hysterectomy. Sally has Justine research cancer drugs in the clinical testing phase in hopes of finding a new drug that could treat her ovarian cancer. Sally meets with an executive from a Brazilian company working on a new treatment for the form of cancer she suffers from. The company is looking for a large injection of cash to conduct clinical trials and do basic research. The treatment is extracted from secretions from a certain species of toad but since toad secretions are toxic, an antidote must be used with the treatment. The company scientists claim not to know how it works. Sally wants to back the Brazilian company but Adam and Ian are skeptical. Despite their response, she decides to go ahead with the financing. With Grant's help Ian uncovers the Brazilian company as a fraud. Adam has left a trapdoor in GRC's contract so they won't pay a penalty for withdrawing from the deal. Sally meets the fraud in her office to confront him. When finished, she warns him not to commit fraud again before throwing him out of her office. Sally later confronts Adam over slipping an escape clause into the contract behind her back. Marty and his wife argue about buying a new house. Finding his son's travel ticket in his briefcase, Marty drives home during trading hours to give it to him. As he is approaching his house, he sees a man leave his yard. When he gets inside, he finds his wife just getting dressed. Suspecting she has been unfaithful, he becomes so distraught that he loses money so the other traders cancel out his trades to help him. Marty leaves the floor. Still distraught, Marty wanders back onto the floor at the end of the trading day. Instead of going home that night, he goes over to the house that Randy has just moved into with his friends, drinks beer, talks about his marital problems and plays street hockey with them until the police arrive to investigate a noise complaint. One of Randy's friends suggests that they move to a house downtown so his wife won't be so bored. After a retail investment advisor goes missing, Adam forces Paul to temporarily take over managing the accounts or leave GRC. Paul meets with an elderly couple that lost most of the money they had invested in an aggressive managed fund that was managed by the missing broker. When the missing fund manager resurfaces, Paul reams him out for losing pensioner's money even after he claims that he also suffered significant losses and also implies that he is cowardly for leaving Paul to tell the clients. Adam chides him for gambling and warns him that he will probably be investigated, charged and will not receive any support from GRC. The episode ends with Sally returning to the office of the support group.
62	14	"Price You Pay"	TW Peacocke	Peter Mitchell, Paul Aitken	January 21, 1999
The episode begins with Chris, Marty and Pail watching a nude video of Sally on the Internet. In the elevator later, Sally gets strange looks from men who have probably also seen the video. Later, Sally is amused when Justine shows her the video and explains that the photo is from a nude photography session she did 2 years before. Marty shows Ian the nude picture of Sally to determine whether it is real or not. When Ian's surprised reaction indicates that it is real, the traders settle their office pool. Sally calls her friends to find out who leaked the photos. After hanging up she notices that her hair is falling out. At the executive meeting, Paul puts forward a technology startup company focused on using high-performance computers to model the properties of new materials. The founder of the startup shows interest in a higher offer from another firm that would cause him to lose control of his company. During discussions over a game of pool, Paul learns that the married tech startup founder is bisexual when he comes on to Paul. Adam later authorizes Paul to provide better deal terms to the tech company to compete with the American investment bank. The founder of the tech company decides to go with GRC's competitor unless Paul can offer him something "tangible". He walks away from the table leaving his hotel room card behind on purpose. Paul seals the deal with the tech company founder by having sex with him. Ian makes the cover of Canadian Business prompting mutual fund offers from other firms to appear. He soon uses his newfound fame to leverage himself a raise and bonus from Adam and Sally. Some of the companies in Ian's fund started to tank while he was not paying attention. Annoyed because Ian rescheduled a meeting to Monday from Friday, his investors cancel his Monday meeting. Sally gets upset when she learns from one of the investors that Ian did not show up to a meeting and canceled another. Adam finds Marty on the floor late in the evening. Marty tells him that Marty's wife has been cheating on him. Niko ends her relationship with Chris. While speaking at an economics conference, the men in the room are inattentive, constantly whisper to one another and make private jokes to each other. To get them to take her seriously, Sally puts her nude picture on the screen and tells the room that she will continue when they have looked at her for long enough. Back at the office Sally notices Marty ogling her and tells him it was her in the picture. Paul gloats to Ian about having closed a deal while Ian's arrogance loses clients. At the bar, Paul tells the traders about having slept with his client to close the deal. Marty and Ziggy think he's joking but Niko knows he's not. She admits she has done the same.
63	15	"History Lesson"	Alex Chapple	Edwina Follows	January 28, 1999
Sally and Adam are accosted by demonstrators when they meet with a property developer at the site of a park that he is about to destroy to build on. Justine is upset that GRC is financing the destruction of her community park and suggests to Sally that GRC pull out. The developer finds what might be an historic artifact at the construction site. Sally wants to cover it up but Adam wants to report it. Due to the archaeological find, construction at the park is halted. Sally accuses Justine of leaking the archaeological find when Adam intervenes to admit that he did it. Sally considers firing him but quickly reconsiders after considering the severance pay he is entitled to. Adam's 16-year-old niece from out of town shows up at the firm and asks him if she can stay with him for a few days. At lunch, Adam's niece flirts with him Ian. Later on, Adam's niece is on a morality tirade against the trading floor when Adam returns to the firm. Later, Adam walks into Ian's office to see his niece forcing herself on Ian and immediately tries to fire him until his niece tells him that she wanted to have sex with Ian. Adam apologizes to Ian for jumping to conclusions. The traders are later amused by a paper Adam's niece wrote about the firm but Marty uses information from Adam's niece's magazine to make trades. The traders make bets on whether or not Marty's marriage will survive. Ian lands a window manufacturer M & A deal but, citing lost confidence in his abilities, Sally orders him to let Paul handle it. The window manufacturer is initially resistant to Paul handling his deal but Paul convinces him to give him a chance. The window manufacturer suggests a different company to merge with from the one Paul chose. When Paul meets with the door manufacturer that the window manufacturer requested as a partner, he quickly discerns that Ian influenced the request. Since Ian's fund is invested in the door manufacturer and a sale of it would benefit the fund, Paul accuses Ian of putting his own interests ahead of the client's. Madelaine, Sally's cancer support buddy who has had leukemia for 15 years shows up at her office to introduce herself. Later on, after nearly falling down the steps due to chemotherapy induced fatigue, Sally decides to rest in her office. Grant later learns of Sally's ovarian cancer by hacking into her computer. Niko expresses dismay at Marty's decision to trade in a company that uses child labor. After hearing Sally yell at her, Grant asks Justine about Sally's health. Adam's niece returns to Medicine Hat. He gets nervous when Paul picks her up to leave. The episode ends with Sally swapping stories with her cancer buddy.
64	16	"Great Stock'n' Roll Swindle"	E. Jane Thompson	Jennifer Cowan	March 18, 1999
The episode begins with Sally crying while her hairstylist shaves her head. Phil wants to sell his stake in GRC. Sally and Adam offer him book value but he wants an IPO. Adam suggests that an IPO would enable GRC to make acquisitions. After Phil's new girlfriend walks into Sally's office while they are talking, he admits that he wants to sell his stake because his girlfriend feels threatened by Sally. After he leaves, Justine notes that his new girlfriend looks a lot like Sally. Sally decides to offer stock to all employees. Adam later assures her that his offer to buy Phil's shares is not in any way hostile. The traders decide to band together to buy Phil's shares. Adam can afford to take Phil's 10% but it will drain his account. Adam and the trading floor each make a bid for Phil's 10%. The bids are identical so Sally asks both parties to bid again. Adam's banker advises him that a higher bid will leave him overextended. Hoping to raise his bid, Marty asks Ian and Paul to join the trading floor bid but they both reject his invitation. Adam offers Marty 5% of GRC for himself if the traders do not submit another bid. Conflicted over having to stab the traders in the back, Marty and his wife get so engrossed discussing the dilemma on the way to counseling that the miss their session. The following morning, Marty announces to the floor that they cannot outbid Adam and withdraws the floor's offer. Paul presents a chartered school that wants to raise money for expansion but Sally rejects the idea. Paul later presents a boy that attends the charter school in Alberta to the executive committee. He is well-versed in business and economics, has no friends and no hobbies but has been accepted to several top tier business schools. When Sally talks to the boy, she learns that he is single minded in his love for business and does not enjoy going to public schools since students there consider him a geek. Despite the fact that his board of directors supports the sale of his company, the CEO and 70% owner of a truck factory refuses to sell his company. Adam advises him to acquiesce or be driven into insolvency by the bidder who is also a competitor. Adam and two other board members approach the CEO of the truck manufacturer together threatening to cash out if he doesn't accept the takeover offer. Fearing that the acquiring company will simply shut down his firm and loyal to his staff, the CEO refuses to consider the offer. Adam offers to support him if he streamlines his operations and gets rid of a division. While Paul tries to convince Ian to back his charter school idea, a porn star enters the firm to meet with Ian. During their meeting, she tries to convince him that there is a large market for her female audience targeted products. Since the buyers of pornographic products are predominantly men, Ian is mostly uninterested until she mentions a product she has planned for men. Figuring out that he wants to have sex with her, the porn star gets angry when Ian meets with her just to confirm that his mutual fund will not back her venture. Niko and Ziggy notice that Sally is wearing a wig. Ziggy hears from Ian that he saw Adam and Marty negotiating before the floor's offer was withdrawn. She promises not to tell the others.
65	17	"Four Mergers and a Funeral"	TW Peacocke	Peter Mitchell	March 25, 1999
The episode begins with David Astin in a meeting with the GRC executive committee. He has heard that Sally has cancer and pointedly asks her how long she intends to keep GRC private. The men in the board room get angry but she responds by removing her wig to reveal her bald head. The chairman has an aneurysm before collapsing. In the commotion, Paul removes the chairman's briefcase without anyone noticing but later puts in on the gurney, again without anyone noticing. The traders notice that their computers have been acting strange. On the trading floor, the computers and phones go dead. Later, the phone technician figures out that Grant's pet mouse chewed through the wires on the trading floor. Since they won't be fixed until the following day, Marty gives the trading floor the rest of the day off. Adam, Ian, Paul and Sally attend David's funeral. Paul uses the opportunity to aggressively pursue as many prospective clients as he can. Adam does the same. David's second wife hits on Ian. Sally bumps into a handsome man. After he finishes signing in, she gleans his personal information from the register. When he sits next to her later, she learns that he checked the register for her name also. Feeling drowsy due to her cancer treatments, Sally nods off but is embarrassed to find herself resting her head on the handsome stranger seated next to her. When she steps outside for air, he insists on escorting her. Outside, they decide to skip the graveside ceremony together and dance at a bar with live entertainment together. Adam uses the limousine to successfully broker a deal between two telecommunications rivals leaving Paul to walk from the church to the grave. When Adam goes to the gathering after the funeral, David's first wife tells him that David considered him a true friend and asks him to make a speech. Adam calls Sally to the firm to close the deal between the two telecommunications companies. One of the telephone technicians who is still at GRC orders a stock trade after seeing the deal between the two telecommunications firms close. Chris and Rachel make amends after meeting after work by chance. While Ian and David's second wife are alone in a limousine together, he turns down her advances. Marty's wife tells him about the affair she had and apologizes for it.
66	18	"Traders Of The Lost Arcs"	Randy Bradshaw	Graham Clegg	April 1, 1999
In the Financial Post, GRC has dropped 4 spaces in the annual rankings of trading floors. In response, Adam and Sally ask Marty if they should hire someone to share the load or replace him. Marty warns his traders that Adam and Sally are not happy with the floor's performance. The traders decide to break into the trading floor of a rival firm and steal a lucky teddy bear from the head trader's desk. The traders decide to access the rival trading floor via a service tunnels when Grant returns with his girlfriend Lulu's access card. When they reach the Federated Dundas trading room, they have to keep the door to the trading room propped opened since Lulu's access card only allows them to enter and not exit the trading room. A security guard hears a laughing message Marty records for his rival, speaks with Grant while the others hide and insists on closing the door leaving them trapped in the trading room. The wife of Adam's deceased brother, who is having financial trouble, shows up at the firm to ask for financial advice. Adam's sister-in-law gives him a briefcase with all of his brother's financial records which he stays up late to examine. In doing so, he learns many things about his estranged brother's life. In hopes that they may be worth something, his sister-in-law draws his attention to some stock certificates. Adam tells his sister-in-law that she will have to sell her house to pay off all of her debts and offers her a loan but she refuses. Adam lies to his sister-in-law by telling her that one of his brother's stock certificates is worth enough to pay off all family debts. After seeing her look his number up in the phone book, Justine calls the man Sally met at the funeral. Caught off balance, she asks him out for dinner. At dinner, Daniel Booth, the man from the funeral, tells her that he's a forensic investigator who has been contracted by the Swiss bank she used to buy back GRC to her. He swears that he did not know he would be investigating her at the time they met and, due to a potential conflict of interest, was reluctant to see her but they decide to continue their romance anyway. Paul begins meeting with clients he poached from David. A Cancorp. banker confronts Adam over a deal that Paul poached. In response, Adam forces Paul to allow Cancorp a role in the project he pilfered from David's briefcase. He then forces Paul to make him the co-lead on the deal. Ian accidentally notices that Paul has stolen correspondence from David and warns him that it's bad luck to steal from the dead. From the trove of information stolen from David's briefcase, Paul offers Ian a lead on one of the deals. Sally's cancer support group buddy shows up at her office unannounced. She asks Justine to call her out of the meeting after half an hour. Sally learns that the cancer is not responding to her chemotherapy treatments so she decides to have a hysterectomy. She announces her intention to have surgery and leaves Adam in charge of the bank. At the hospital, she successfully negotiates an earlier surgery date in exchange for a $250,000 donation to the surgeon's research lab. Marty and the others escape from the Federated Dundas trading floor via a service tunnel. As they are leaving Marty has a small accident requiring stitches. While at the hospital, they discover that Sally is having surgery. To prevent the rest of the trading floor from learning of her cancer operation, Marty insists on visiting her alone. Grant stays in the hospital until Sally comes to. When she does, he apologizes for blaming her for Jack's death and tells her he does not believe Jack is dead because of her. They share a moment after she admits that she blames herself for his death. Sally's operation is successful and her prognosis promising. She gets a visit in the hospital from Daniel. The episode ends with the trading floor having an up day and Marty calling his rival to gloat about having stolen the teddy bear.
67	19	"Every Secret Thing"	Philip Earnshaw	Shelley Eriksen	April 8, 1999
Fatty Size decides to withdraw $15M from the fund, leaving Ian in a quandary. Adam hires someone from outside the firm to replace Ian as fund manager, leaving him with no responsibilities at GRC. After meeting with several prospects to no avail, Ian decides to pursue the Cancorp. deal Paul gave him. Marty convinces Adam to authorize a raise in the floor's trading limit to bet on Japanese market futures. Marty moves Grant to the trading floor. Niko warns Marty that his trades are large in relation to the size of GRC's capital base. Marty, Grant and Ziggy stay late to trade while Asian markets are opened. Despite cautions from Grant and Ziggy, Marty decides to go over limit in his Yen trade. The following morning, the trading floor is up over $10M but Grant advises against taking profits since he expects the market to continue moving their way. Marty asks Adam to raise his trading limit by $2M. Marty lies to the floor by telling them Adam raised him by $5M and they begin trading as such. Ziggy becomes nervous after Japanese equity indexes start to rise. After learning that Marty is over the floor's trading limit, the traders try to convince him to unload their position but he refuses. A reverse in Japanese government policy causes the trading floor's positions profit to reverse. Against his trader's orders, Marty decides to hold their position even though it is now a loss. After the trading floor's firms losses swell, Marty admits to Adam that he went over limit. In response, Sally gives him another $1M. Emboldened, Marty risks extending the floor's losses further by setting up new positions in Japanese securities, again against the will of his traders. Daniel tries to interrogate Sally about her suspicious Swiss transactions but she doesn't take him seriously and flirts with him. Daniel finishes his interrogation of Sally while she is still in bed recovering. After speaking with Phil, Daniel questions Sally on why she bought the bonds when he would have returned the bank to her had she asked for it. After Sally opens a present from Daniel, she learns that he was married before and had a daughter who drowned. Sally begins to tell Daniel more about the bonds but, knowing her dealings are not fully above board and he might have to report her to the police, he stops her. After receiving her purchase offer, Adam's executive client is fired by her publishing company. She suspects they learned of her plans for an online textbook. Adam learns that the publishing company his client is trying to buy has received an offer from an American bookstore chain. Adam's publishing executive client explains that the American bookstore will drop all but the publisher's bestselling writers. Adam and the publishing executive client find a way to eliminate the competing bid and buy the publisher. Adam's sister-in-law, Catherine decides to take a job in Toronto.
68	20	"Secret Information"	Steve DiMarco	Peter Mitchell	April 15, 1999
Sally returns to GRC. The hydraulics deal Paul offered Ian went to Cancorp. Ian asks Paul for another deal lead and Paul gives him an arcade. Ian suggests the arcade chain owners partner with a 30 location family hotel chain. Ian meets with the family hotel chain owner who is interested in partnering with the arcade chain only if he can have an equity stake in them but when asked, the arcade chain refuses to partner. Ian arranges for the hotel chain owner to meet with the arcade chain owner. The arcade owner tells the hotel owner that he is interested in an outright purchase and not a partnership. Paul becomes angry when he learns that Ian did not use some private pictures to blackmail the arcade owner into the deal with the hotel. With the trading floor down, Marty asks Sally for more capital to get out of their $9M hole. She allows $3M. Marty anticipates the Bank of Japan will sell off a large US bonds and treasury holdings. Marty holds his losing position against the advice of Niko and Chris. Marty turns out to be right when the Japanese government rescinds its plans for a bank bailout. After Ian and Paul leave the meeting, Adam proposes to Sally that they take GRC public. He later tries to convince Sally to take GRC public but she refuses. Later on, Sally explains to Adam how she regained control of the bank and how, under the scrutiny of an IPO, she would be destroyed and so would the bank. Adam agrees to keep GRC private but asks for joint ownership of the bank to keep his silence. Over dinner, Sally tells Daniel the whole story of how she got the $165M. She explains that Jack's mistake caused her to lose Gardner so taking his money allowed her to take back what was hers. Before leaving town for 2 days, Daniel visits Sally to tell her that he is still interested in her despite her secret. Adam is having difficulty finding a caterer for a 20 person party on short notice when Catherine offers to do it. At the party for Leo, uncomfortable with him having Alzheimer's, the bankers pay him scant attention. With most of the guests ignoring Leo, Adam suggests that he, Catherine, Leo and Leo's wife slip away from the party to go out for a walk. During a snowball fight, Adam and Catherine share their first kiss. They later spend the night together. The firm has a record trading day after Marty stayed the course.
69	21	"A Bitter Pill"	Gary Harvey	Jennifer Cowan, Graham Clegg	April 22, 1999
After meeting with a client at a strip club to celebrate a successful private placement, Paul is beaten by a group of thugs who were hired by Cancorp. None of the bankers want to visit Paul in the hospital so it falls on Ian since he is the most junior. When questioned by the police, Paul does not tell the officer why he was mugged and beaten. Knowing that Paul could not wrestle so many deals from Cancorp. without inside help, Adam presses him to admit to how he got the information. When Paul tells him of how he stole David's briefcase when he died, Adam decides to keep a closer eye on him. Paul warns Ian not to pursue any of the Cancorp. deals, admitting that Cancorp. was behind his beating. He also terminates the Cancorp. deals he was working on. When he looks into the cupboard where the photocopied deal information was, he finds it empty. Realizing Adam took the Cancorp. documentation, Paul confronts him. Chris is uncharacteristically cheerful after taking neutraceutical pills from a health food store. Adam and Sally grant him permission to act as an investment banker for the herbal medicine company where bought the pills that are making him feel good. Chris successfully brokers a deal between his herbal products client and pharmaceutical company with national distribution. He is dismayed to learn that the herbal medicine he has been taking doesn't work. Adam is pleased with the way Chris's deal worked out. Ziggy runs into Fatty who asks her to consider chaperoning one of his young stars so she feigns sickness to be Fatty's assistant for a few days. Ziggy starts to work with Stash, one of Fatty's young rock stars. Stash throws the food Ziggy gives him and a cell phone given to her by Fatty from a moving limousine. Stash later apologizes to Ziggy for his behavior. Stash appreciates the job Ziggy has been doing and wants her to continue. After learning that he will receive a $2M advance, she counsels him on what to do with it. Ziggy returns to the floor and tells Marty the truth about why she was away. He is accepting of her explanation but warns her not to look for jobs on other trading floors. Ian asks Grant to use his quantitative skills to pick winners for his hockey pool. Grant is having difficulty making picks for Ian's hockey pool until Ian tells him of a hockey almanac available on diskette. A last minute change in the hockey pool rules completely nullifies Grant and Ian's strategy. Justine is late for work because she helped a friend approach a bank for a loan. Sally loans Justine's friend $20,000 to set up a mobile cappuccino business. Sally puts Justine in charge of a newly created small business loans division. At the end, Adam is seen using Paul's information for himself.
70	22	"This World...Then the Fireworks"	John L'Ecuyer	Peter Mitchell	April 29, 1999
Grant meets with a group of people he has not seen for a long time with the express purpose of crashing the market. A programmer friend of Grant's shows up at the firm with access codes to most of the major banks and trading floors in North America intending to crash the market by putting bonus trades through. They successfully run a test in Asian markets. Back at GRC, Niko notices inexplicable market activity later that day. Not disgruntled like the other hackers, Grant calls the police and slips out the back door when they raid the place. Marty is about to leave the floor permanently when Grant rushes in and tells everyone the truth about the market crash. Not wanting to miss the opportunity, Marty goes back to the trading floor. Marty turns 40. Showing signs of a midlife crisis, Marty meets with his chief Bay Street rival, returns the teddy bear he had stolen, asks for advice on aging and leaves the bill to his competitor. The traders realize they forgot Marty's birthday and decide to get him a present the following morning. Marty announces to Adam and Sally that he has decided to retire. When they respond that they need time to replace him, he recommends Niko. After receiving birthday wishes from the traders, Marty announces his retirement and his choice of Niko as a replacement. Chris becomes visibly upset at being passed over. Adam considers taking an offer to become CEO of Cancorp. He later accepts the position of Cancorp. CEO and is making a speech to their boardroom when he is stopped and told that the offer was not sincere. He is so humiliated that he sleeps at GRC. In an effort to help Adam recover, Paul hands him a letter. The letter Paul gave Adam is proof of a bribe to the government so Adam meets with the Cancorp. executive that arranged for his humiliation. The Cancorp. executive offers to pay for their silence but Adam has already called the police. Sally works to raise financing for an in vitro fertilization clinic doing research on an artificial womb. Niko is disturbed when she receives a message from a man from her past. In opposition to its product, Sally forces Ian to terminate his cigarette manufacturer deal. In opposition to the artificial womb, she also terminates the in vitro fertilization clinic deal and then signs on for a Third World betterment project. Catherine is pregnant. A man from Niko's past shows up and she leaves the floor immediately.

=== Season 5 (1999–2000) ===
No. overall	No. in season	Title	Directed by	Written by	Original release date
71	1	"Episode One"	Gary Harvey	Peter Mitchell	December 2, 1999
The season begins with Adam having a nightmare about being old while sleeping in the waiting room of a hospital before he is woken by a hospital employee. He soon goes to the room where Catherine is with his newborn son. At the morning meeting, after all bankers are having difficulty landing and keeping deals, Sally laments having stolen deals from Cancorp. Adam arrives late and announces the birth of his son, Matthew. Marty distributes copies of a book he has written to all members of his firm. Disappointed when his book doesn't sell any copies on its first day, he goes to the bookstore and replaces books on an end display with his book. The next day, Marty calls his publisher to angrily voice his discontent with their efforts to promote his book. Marty thinks 200 copies of his book have been sold but soon learns that Grant bought them to make him feel better. After learning of Marty's troubles selling his book, Adam calls a friend at his publishing company for greater promotion priority. Grant decides to move from his closet to the trading floor. Ziggy and new trader named Mike Pinetti show up together. Later, Mike confesses to Niko and Ziggy that he spent 2 years in jail for aggravated assault after beating a man who raped his sister and that he currently lives with his mother. Chris is now an analyst in the firm, junior to the investment bankers. Paul gets Sally to reassign Chris to him. Justine asks Sally for more capital for her small business division. Sally agrees to 2/3 of the capital she requested. Sally travels to Chicago hoping to scare up capital from venture capital firms. In Chicago, she is rejected by several venture capital firms before meets with a quirky venture capitalist named Ben Sullivan of Epona Capital, who seems open to a partnership. She decides to stay in Chicago overnight. Ben agrees to invest in one of the four companies Sally pitches. She calls Ian to Chicago with the CEO of the company to present further details. After presenting to a group of high-net-worth American investors, Sally raises more money than needed for the telecommunications technology startup. Adam proposes a joint venture with another investment bank but, fearing Cancorp's response, the other firm refuses. Due to pressure from Cancorp., GRC is having a difficult time landing deals. Tired, Adam and Catherine decide to hire a helper for Matthew and Adam becomes a more involved father.
72	2	"Career Opportunities"	TW Peacocke	Shelley Eriksen	December 9, 1999
An old friend of Adam's approaches him to raise money for his petroleum company. Ian and Sally lose another deal to Cancorp. prompting Sally to press Adam to make amends with them. As a peace offering, Adam invites Cancorp. to act as co-lead on his friend's petroleum company financing. His Cancorp. rival counters by suggesting that he steer his friend's company toward a convertible bond offering for the benefit of one of Cancorp's clients but Adam initially refuses. Adam knows that a convertible bond offering could cause one of Cancorp's clients to gain control of his friend's petroleum company. Doing so would not be in his best interest but would be in GRC's. His friend is skeptical of the convertible issue but, out of trust, decides to go along with Adam. Adam's petroleum producer friend is irate after his common stock drops by $2/share in one day. After learning that a hedge fund has bought 24% of his company, Adam's petroleum producer friend realizes Adam has laid him out to appease Cancorp. Marty neglects his floor duties to promote his book. Distracted by his book, the trading floor's yearly profit suffers and so does Marty's bonus. A woman who has just quit her job to trade at home full-time approaches Marty on the trading floor for an autograph. At a book signing later, Marty meets a creep named Darren who idolizes him. Ziggy is upset at receiving a meager bonus after a poor performance review with Sally and starts looking for another job. Paul joins a Christian business group. At Paul's first meeting, he relates how he had sex with a client to land a deal as his ethical dilemma but neglects to mentions it was a homosexual encounter. Having had a difficult year after being pulled from the mutual fund, Ian does not receive a bonus but decides to stay with the firm anyway.
73	3	"Getting Lucky"	TW Peacocke	Jennifer Cowan	December 16, 1999
The other traders are annoyed with Marty's hubris. At a charity casino, Marty meets rival traders who also think his book popularity is making him arrogant. One of them offhandedly mentions a deal to Marty. One of the rival traders later gives Marty a further hint about a deal. The following morning, against the advice of the other traders, Marty begins to act on it. The company that Marty is making a play on is halted. Marty leaves in the middle of a radio interview when he learns that the company he received a tip on is in trouble with the police and rushes back to the trading floor hoping to minimize the damage. When he sees the traders who played him, Marty is even more arrogant. Catherine is gets bored with her homemaker lifestyle and decides to return to Alberta. After a discussion, Catherine decides to leave Matthew in Toronto with Adam. The firm decides to sell off its retail arm. Adam orders Chris and Paul to reprice the retail arm at a price 33% higher than their valuation. He later changes his mind and decides to go with Chris's valuation of their retail division. Justine gets Sally interested in cardboard temporary homeless shelters but their idea is rebuffed by a civil servant. Sally asks an anti-poverty activist with a history of using unorthodox methods to make public protests to help bring the government around to approving the cardboard temporary homeless shelters for use. Embarrassed by the anti-poverty activist, the bureaucrat that originally rejected Sally's cardboard homeless shelter idea agrees to buy 750 boxes if she can stop the activist from generating any more negative publicity for her ministry. Not being an experienced player, Grant loses at blackjack at a charity casino. He later goes to the casino after hours and pays the blackjack dealer to help him practice for a few hours. After winning consistently, Grant feels validated that he is smart enough to play blackjack. Sally proposes a merger between GRC and the American venture capitalist.
74	4	"Solitary Consignment"	Gary Harvey	Graham Clegg	December 30, 1999
While volunteering as a prison counselor with the Christian business group, Paul is assigned to a child killer who has designed and patented a unique GPS device to track children but need help bringing it to market. He wants any profits directed to his grandchildren and children's charities. GRC agrees to do the child tracker deal on the condition that the killer's name not be associated with it but the child killer is insistent that his name be included on the child tracking device. After the child killer fails at a suicide attempt, Sally and Paul convince him to allow the project to proceed without his name on it. While trying to sell a manufacturing plant, Ian is approached by a concerned union leader named Wayne. Later, after the factory buyer bails, the union decides to make a bid for it. Adam refuses the $4M Ian's needs to help Wayne's union buy out the factory. Darren, one of Marty's fans sets up a web site for him that includes unauthorized public shots of Marty. Darren later shows up on the floor to ask Marty for a job. Marty shoos him away but notices him taking pictures of Marty before leaving. Later on, Marty gets very upset when Darren, his stalker fan, shows up at his house one evening. Much to the consternation of her colleagues, Ziggy joins a narcotics using group of traders from another firm for drinks. Hoping to land a job with another firm, she stays out all night and starts doing cocaine with them. Ian confronts the other bankers when he learns that the child killer's deal was passed but his union buyout was not. Marty receives an email in which Darren promises not to stalk him. The episode ends with the firm receiving a visit from correctional services Canada representatives. Any intellectual property created by prisoners legally belongs to the federal government.
75	5	"Budding Prospects"	Richard J. Lewis	Peter Mitchell	January 12, 2000
The episode begins with Paul ridiculing Ian for his union auto plant buyback efforts. GRC formally signs a joint venture agreement with Epona Capital. Grant plays blackjack online. Ian tries to sell Ben on the plant buyback proposal but Adam suggests he find something else for the plant to manufacture. Wayne, the plant union leader, rejects Ian's idea to use the plant for electric vehicle manufacturing. Ian arranges another meeting with Wayne over the electric car idea and convinces him to consider it, pointing out that when electric cars take off, as owners of the factory, his workers will see financial benefits far beyond their union wage. Wayne agrees to give the idea some consideration. Later, Ian's environmentalist client proposes they retrofit the plant to make it more environmentally friendly and sell their emissions to companies exceeding their pollution allowance. In the end, Wayne agrees to the electric car manufacturing deal. Ben pitches an American medical marijuana company to the executive committee. After meeting with the American marijuana grower who has brought along some samples of his product, Sally and Adam consider getting involved with the deal. Sally and Ben meet with a bureaucrat who outrightly refuses to consider conducting clinical trials on medical marijuana from an American firm. When Sally learns that all Canadian applicants for medical marijuana clinical trials have criminal records or are inexperience in marijuana growing, she convinces the same bureaucrat who rejected them to promise due consideration since Ben's American grower is a botanist without a criminal record. At the end of the episode, Ben and Sally smoke marijuana on the roof of the building together. While complaining to him about not being able to do his own deals, Chris notices Adam with a popular out of print children's book from a series he read as a child. To help Chris, Grant uses the Internet to find out that rights to the children's book series have reverted to the author who has refused attempts by publishers to acquire the rights. Chris finds the reclusive author of the children's book series but quickly learns she has no interest in publishing the series. The reclusive author only becomes interested in republishing her book series after Chris explains that she can get $10M upfront if they issue a bond against the rights to her book. On the floor, the children's book bond issue sells out briskly but during her speech in front of the press, they children's book author announces her plans to donate the lion's share of her proceeds from the bond issue to various white supremacist groups causing the Jewish publisher to pull out of the deal immediately. Since GRC will take a financial hit if the books are not published, Chris offers to allow the publisher out of the deal or face litigation. The publisher agrees to tear up the contract and Chris finds another publisher for the children's books.
76	6	"It's a Family Affair"	TW Peacocke	Shelley Eriksen	January 20, 2000
The father of Niko's son, who she has no contact with, approaches her to ask for money. He apparently works for another Bay Street firm and has taken $2M from client accounts to bet on a stock that failed. While she does not have the money to help him, he knows that she might be able to get insider information so he can make a trade that might profit him enough to replace the money he embezzled. To help the father of her son, Niko asks Paul for advance information on an upcoming merger that her son's father can profit from. She explains that if her son's father goes to jail, she will become a mother. On his way to work one morning, Paul drops off information about an upcoming merger at Niko's condo but after hearing her son's voice on the phone, Niko decides not to use the inside information Paul has given her to help her son's father out of trouble. Instead of giving him the inside information when she meets with him, Niko encourages her son's father to turn himself in and serve time in jail rather than risk having both of them go to jail if he gets caught using the insider information she was supposed to give him. She offers to take care of her son while he is in jail but he refuses to turn himself in. Adam engages a family-owned media company client who is estranged from her brother. Adam meets with the estranged brother who states that he is not averse to a merger between his media company and his sister's but explains that she may not accept his over-the-top programming. Later, Adam's client claims that it is not the programming on her brother's radio station she objects to. She doesn't want a merger because she expects to be at odds with her brother over programming issues. In order to create a common enemy for the feuding brother and sister, Adam and Sally get a rival media company owner to feign interest in taking over radio stations. In an effort to head off a hostile takeover, the feuding brother and sister agree to a takeover. Marty assigns Niko to the role of head trader while is away for a book sellers convention. At the convention, Marty is approached by a flirtatious infomercial producer who thinks his book could be well marketed in an infomercial. After an evening of dancing together, the infomercial producer almost seduces Marty but he breaks it off before they have sex. Despite that, she still wants to do the infomercial. After an argument with his wife later, Marty goes straight to the infomercial producer's hotel room hoping to resume their tryst only to find that her husband has flown into town to surprise her. Wayne, the union leader, understands that they will have to break up the union and make concessions to keep their manufacturing jobs but anticipates difficulty convincing the other members. Ian has to decertify Wayne's union to make the electric vehicle deal fly. At a union softball game, he tries to sell the union members on the merits of the deal. When Ian and Wayne meet with the union boss, Ian suspects that he will try to take some action against them at a later stage. Expecting to be reunited with her son, Niko is joyful but when she appears at the park where they are supposed to meet, the boy and his father do not show up. Instead, the babysitter arrives to tell her that they won't be there. The episode ends with Niko attending to Grant like a mother would to a son after hitting him in the eye with a baby toy she threw at him.
77	7	"Scents and Sensibilities"	Scott Smith (director)	Alyson Feltes	January 27, 2000
The episode begins with Ziggy and the traders she parties with at a house the morning after a party. Brick mentions to her that there is a shake-up on the trading floor of his firm so they will be looking for new traders and offers to put in a good word for her. Sally meets with a former university contact of hers. During their conversation, he complains of how budget shortfalls are forcing the university to consider partnerships with industry firms such as pharmaceutical companies. Sally offers to donate $20M from GRC to help but warns that there will also be strings attached. More comfortable with a former colleague than an unfamiliar corporation, he is interested in her offer. Sally suggests to Adam that they offer the university a $20M endowment in exchange for a first pass on any of its projects. Adam suggests $10M and the right to choose which projects to fund and to what extent. The executive committee finds 6 university research projects they want to invest in. Sally's university contact introduces a professor doing research in an area with no practical application. Just after Paul promises a professor $2.5M for a drug testing project, Sally informs him that since she has allocated $1M to the project with no practical application, only $1.5M will be available for drug testing. Instead of telling the professor they can only allocate $1.5M, Paul instructs him to ask for Sally when he visits the firm. When the drug testing project professor arrives at the firm, he complains to Sally that raising another $1M will delay the product's market entry. Adam, who was also under the understanding that drug testing would receive $2.5M also gets angry that Sally changed the allocation amount they had agreed on at the board meeting. When she explains how she diverted $1M to another project with no commercial value, he gets angrier. During dinner, Sally explains to her boyfriend that she decided to allocation $1M to a pie in the sky project because it was meaningful to her. They also decide that they will not move in together. On the trading floor, Niko, Ziggy and Marty notice Grant's body odor but for fear of hurting him, nobody wants to tell him. While they are trying to decide who will tell Grant, Mike shows up and immediately suggests that he take a shower. Grant explains that he has been working so hard on Marty's CD-ROM that he has forgotten to change and shower and immediately leaves the floor to clean himself up. When the other traders learn that Grant is working on Marty's CD-ROM for free, Niko and Niko negotiate a compensation arrangement for him. The CD-ROM Grant has developed for Marty is too complex for the average person to understand. While having lunch together, Marty and the infomercial producer discuss another possible tryst. Ziggy is excited about an engagement party she has been invited to. At the engagement party, the groom-to-be flirts with Ziggy. Goaded on by one of her friends, Ziggy sleeps with the groom at his engagement party. M.J., Ben Sullivan's daughter arrives at the firm from the U.S. and immediately hits it off with Paul. He allows M.J. to put up the other $1M for the drug testing company but wanting to keep Canadian technology in Canada, Sally is enraged when she learns that Paul and M.J. went behind her back to an American financier. When Adam walks in on the argument, he agrees with Paul and M.J.'s determination to help the drug testing product to market faster than its competitors but frowns on them resorting to subterfuge to achieve their ends. In private, Sally later admits to Ian that she screwed up on the drug testing deal, saying she thinks Paul did the right thing the wrong way. After Grant and Marty finish the CD-ROM over the weekend, they show it to the infomercial producer and she loves it. Noticing the flirtation between Marty and the infomercial producer, grant asks point blank if he plans to sleep with her. Marty later blames Grant's remarks for not having slept with the infomercial producer. The traders buy Grant a Palm Pilot to help him remember things and keep organized. Offended and preferring to keep things in his head, he returns it to them then launching into a tirade about an impending market crash leading the other traders to raise doubts about his mental stability. Dunnage Motors receives orders for its electric cars from municipal governments.
78	8	"Hawks"	Michael DeCarlo	Peter Mitchell	February 3, 2000
The episode begins with Ben and Sally waiting on a contact of Ben's interested in buying an International Hockey League franchise with the intent of moving it to Texas. While waiting, Sally mentions that she broke up with her boyfriend. The owner of the IHL hockey team gets cold feet due to media and community pressure against selling the team to an American owner. He also fears that his auto dealerships might be boycotted. The IHL transaction leaves GRC in a dilemma. If they facilitate the sale to an American buyer, there may be a backlash in Canada but if they are unable to do the deal, they may lose out on future business with the American buyer. The IHL team owner accepts an offer from Ben and Sally's American client that is $2M higher than the offer from the consortium of local businessmen. When confronted by hockey fans protesting the sale of the hockey team to an American bidder, Sally points out that during home games, stands are often empty and the American buyer can give the team more stability than the local consortium. Adam and Sally allow Marty to use the firm's trading floor for an infomercial. Barb is present during the filming of his infomercial at GRC offices. While filming, Vanessa and Marty's mutual flirtation is so obvious that Paul's child prodigy inventor prospect even notices. After the shooting, Barb confronts Marty, asking him point-blank if he has been having sex with Vanessa. After Adam and Sally watch the infomercial, they insist that all references to GRC be cut out. Marty arranges to meet Vanessa at her hotel the day after the first airing of his infomercial but after it bombs, Vanessa shows up at the firm to tell Marty that its broadcasting has been ordered halted and she cannot meet with him for their planned tryst because she is leaving town early and is no longer interested in him. They share a passionate kiss before she leaves. Concerned over his mental state, Marty requires that all of Grant's trades be approved. Grant is soon annoyed that his trades must be approved by Marty. After a call option play does not go as he expected, Grant suspects he has medical problems. Paul attempts to woo a thirteen-year-old girl who has invented an effective nutritional supplement. Since the child prodigy nutritional supplement inventor is being wooed by other bankers, Paul takes her out in an attempt to gain her trust and make her more likely to choose him. On their second outing together, Paul better connects with the 13-year-old who chooses him to handle her project. Paul notices a typo in the contract drawn up by the 13-year-old inventor's mother's law student boyfriend that causes the rights for the nutritional supplement to revert to GRC and not the girl and her family as intended. The girl's mother's boyfriend tried to trick GRC by regaining ownership of the product rights after GRC had invested R & D money into the project but the typo does the exact opposite so Paul signs the contract. Later, when the prodigy who claims she knew nothing of the clause confronts him, he is unrepentant. Ziggy's party hard lifestyle is taking a toll on her work performance. At a bar, Tonya, a woman who had previously approached Marty for a book autograph makes advances toward Marty while asking for trading advice but he rudely blows her off. When he reaches his car later, he finds that someone has thrown a large rock through the window and left a copy of his book on the seat Ben and Sally become intimate.
79	9	"The Running of the Bulls"	Reid Dunlop	Graham Clegg	February 10, 2000
At a bar, Ian runs into some friends from his university days. One of them is lead on a hot technology offering. He suggests to Ian that there might be room for a co-lead. When Ian tells Adam and Sally about it, they are skeptical but Adam suggest that he accompany Ian to the meeting. Ian assigns Chris to research the technology and the key players involved in it. When Ian shows up to the meeting, he quickly learns that his university buddy picked a co-lead that morning. They learn that the third in command selling group role must still be filled and Ian's friend intends to choose the role with a card game. Adam agrees. At the card game, after two of the bankers bow out, the one remaining non-GRC banker offers Adam and Ian a deal if they bow out but they refuse. Ian soon bows out before Adam wins third place. Back at the offices, Ian is ready to lead the selling group but Adam still wants to angle his way into the co-lead position. Chris learns that the co-lead has health problems and the software CEO collects guns. Sally calls Ben to find a merger partner for a Canadian wireless company and he delegates the task to M.J. Sally and M.J. are unable to agree on a suitable candidate for the Canadian wireless company. Sally and M.J. agree on a merger partner for the Canadian wireless company. During a meeting with CEOs of the two companies, Sally is surprised to learn that M.J. only put her own name on the board of directors of the merged entity and not Sally's. In response, Sally tries to talk the CEO of the wireless company out of the merger but he refuses. Chris leaks the microprocessor company secondary issue information to Marty who promptly acts on it. Later, the software company hits the restricted list while the trading floor is still accumulating it. Thinking he is gravely ill, Grant decides to have a CAT scan done. Grant's CAT scan results indicate that he is fine but he thinks he has a tumor. Wayne and Denise Laplante feel that Ian is neglecting Dunnage Motors. Adam meets with the software company CEO hoping to gain co-lead position but the meeting does not go well. The CEO gets offended when Adam suggests the current co-lead has Narcolepsy and might not be fit to co-lead before outrightly refusing Adam's suggestion that GRC co-lead. He they refuses the vintage rifle Adam has brought, explaining that he stopped collecting rifles after his cousin was killed in a hunting accident. Still determined to gain co-lead, Adam tells Ian and Chris to find someone who can gain advance notice on what the share price will be for the secondary offering. In response, Ian makes a deal with one of the bankers who lost third place giving him 100,000 options in the company at 25% below market rate plus a rabbit delivered to his apartment every month in exchange for advance notice on the secondary price. They receive notice on the planned offering price for the stock but knowing that the higher the secondary offering is priced, the less the smaller houses will be able to afford and the more GRC will be able to take, Adam asks Marty to spread rumors on the company in order to boost its stock price and force the smaller brokerages to take a smaller share of the offering. Marty agrees to do it in exchange for an unspecified favor. The lead banker for the software deal soon approaches Adam and orders him to get Marty to stop spreading rumors or lose their place in the deal. Adam complies. When Adam needs more cash for his and Ian's software company offering, hoping to teach M.J. a lesson, Sally decides to help him by pulling the bridge loan to the wireless company and dissolving her partnership with M.J. She also agrees to give Adam and Ian's software company co-lead advance notice on the wireless merger as a peacemaker gift. In advance of Adam and Ian's meeting, Chris plants a cellphone in the washroom of the lead bank. When Adam and Ian meet to bid on GRC's share of the software company, there is a long delay before the lead arrives. When he arrives, Ian immediately goes to the bathroom to use the cell phone that Chris had hidden in there to check the trading price before the bidding begins. Adam asks for 25% of the secondary offering. The co-lead also wants 25% but, at the price of the previous day's market close, cannot afford to take it. His narcolepsy kicks in and he soon falls asleep during the meeting. Since the co-lead cannot afford the 25% and has fallen asleep so cannot argue, GRC becomes co-lead. Ben flies in from Chicago to mediate between Sally and M.J. Sally admits scuttling the deal was a vindictive move. After M.J. leaves, Ben sides with Sally and tells her he would have done exactly the same thing. The episode ends with Ian meeting with Wayne and Denise, who he has been neglecting for the whole episode.
80	10	"Someone to Watch Over Me"	Philip Earnshaw	Jennifer Cowan	February 17, 2000
Someone from the surveillance department of the Toronto Stock Exchange shows up at GRC intent on meeting with Marty and Grant. Sally agrees to lend Grant to the TSE to test their new trading system but Grant is reluctant to go and when he refuses, the TSE representative hints at reopening the investigation into the tech stock crash he was involved with from the previous year. Ziggy hints at her plans to leave when Marty offers her a temporary promotion while Grant is gonebut gets upset when she learns that Brick helped Tory get a senior floor position at his firm. While they are out, Brick runs over a homeless man on the sidewalk. Ziggy wants to stay on the scene to help him but the others pull her away. Later, they report the accident from a phone booth near Ziggy's apartment. Upset about the accident the previous night, Ziggy is late for work and out of sorts the following morning. In an attempt to get out a date with someone his mother has fixed him up with, Mike asks Ziggy to accompany him to a wedding. After her inattentiveness to her job causes trading losses, Ziggy's behavior starts to concern Marty. The trading room computers all freeze at the same time due to technical problems at the stock exchange so Marty allows everyone to take the remainder of the day off. When Ziggy meets with Brick and the others, they decide not to report their involvement in the hit and run to avoid being charged with manslaughter. The other three traders decide to keep the accident a secret. Still concerned about Ziggy, Marty asks Mike if he knows why her recent behavior has been so strange. Brick shows up at GRC to offer Ziggy the job she has been asking him for the past month but she refuses his offer. Before they part, he tells her that he made a $50,000 donation to a homeless shelter. When the very beautiful woman that Mike's mother tried to fix him up with appears at GRC wanting to know if they will be attending the wedding together, Mike says no. Seeing this, Ziggy agrees to go with him. Adam is offered a job by Charles, a client of his, and later agrees to act as a consultant on a high-speed rail project. Niko meets with a private investigator hired by her ex-husband's firm to provide as much help as she can for them to find him. On receiving news that her son was found, Niko quickly leaves the trading floor. Later, Niko's first meeting with her son doesn't go well. When Grant returns from the stock exchange early, Marty suspects he is responsible for the exchange crash from the previous day. During lunch with another banker, Sally and Adam learn that the market crash was caused by Grant. Sally meets with Marty, expresses doubts about Grant's mental capacity and orders him to let Grant go immediately but the first time Marty approaches him, he cannot bring himself to fire Grant. When she sees Grant on the trading floor the following morning, Sally insists Marty fire Grant immediately. After negotiating, they decide to give him a leave of absence. Marty is so upset about having asked Grant to leave that he doesn't even yell when Ziggy tells him she lost $100,000. When Sally visits Grant at his apartment to tell him that there is a place for him at GRC when he feels better, Grant responds that he doesn't intend to return. He also rejects the number of a psychiatrist she tries to give him.
81	11	"Money Shot"	E. Jane Thompson	Peter Mitchell	February 24, 2000
Sally meets with a former university professor colleague who asks her to take her pornography company public and chooses Paul to help her with the IPO. During their lunch meeting, Sally warns her pornographer friend that going public will mean that shareholders will want a say in the company's operations. During their lunch, Sally learns that her friend has appeared in films after a man in the restaurant stares at her. Meanwhile, Paul visits the porn studio to meet with Fiona's partner, to learn about the business. He returns to Sally impressed with the porn company's prospects and tells her they can finance it any way she wants. Sally visits the porn studio herself to recommend a public offering as the best way to raise financing. While there, she discusses remuneration and working conditions for the porn actresses with her friend. Back at GRC later, Sally becomes disturbed after viewing a rape scene in one of the porn films. When Sally goes to Adam for advice on what to do about the porn issue, Adam suggest she use her position to reshape the company. Later during a meeting with Fiona and her partner, Sally announces that she will increase the share price by $0.50 with the extra capital raised going to a health and education fund for the porn stars. She also insists that any business that the company conducts in any foreign countries strictly adhere to Canadian labor laws. Fiona's partner initially tries to terminate the deal with GRC but Sally threatens to have every government agency investigate them if they do. Fiona agrees to Sally's conditions. At Dunnage Motors, since financing is contingent on successfully delivering the first order and the plant is seemingly behind its production schedule, Ian is concerned about them not being able to fill the first order. Later, Wayne asks Ian for money to hire more men to finish the first car order on time. At a Dunnage party to celebrate completion of their first order on time, Ian and Denise dance and become intimate in one of the cars. On the morning when the first order of Dunnage cars are about to ship, the drivers hired to ship the cars, who are members of Wayne's former union, refuse to cross the picket line. The union has also banded with a union of municipal workers to strike if their government takes delivery of any of the vehicles. When Ian calls the municipal controller to explain the delay, he learns that the deadline will not be extended. In order to reward him for his success, Sally and Adam offer Chris a 2 week vacation and airplane tickets to anywhere. While Chris is trying to decide where to go, Paul suggests that Adam cashed in some air miles to avoid giving him a raise. Later, Chris learns that his father has died. His response is uncaring. He soon decides against taking a vacation and meets with Adam to request more work. Chris misses his father's funeral to facilitate a deal between two biotechnology firms. Chris later rejects a card from the floor traders. Adam gets the federal government to agree to a $250M investment in the high-speed rail project. They then plan to get agreements from the provincial governments. Impressed, Charles Fosset asks Adam to join his company full-time. During drinks with Marty, Chris expresses his regret about not attending his father's funeral. He also expresses discontent with his job and life in general. When Chris tells him that his life is better, Marty shares that his marriage is close to divorce. Wayne receives a call from a Japanese company planning to launch a line of electric vehicles that is interested in buying the factory, getting the workers back in the union and moving into production within a year. He asks for Ian's help. Ian is a bit disappointed that the EV company will not be Canadian. The episode ends with one of the porn stars approaching Sally on the street to thank her for getting better working conditions.
82	12	"The One You Bury"	Scott Smith (director)	Shelley Eriksen	March 2, 2000
While making out in the back of a taxi, Sally asks Ben to marry her. At the morning meeting later, Sally announces that she married Ben to the stunned executive committee. Before the bank opens, Adam tries to sell a potential investor in the high-speed railway venture at his GRC office. In the underground parking area, Marty is approached by Darren, the fan of his book that used to stalk him. Darren has lost his money trading and is now head of security for the parking lot. Fearing for his safety, Marty wants Darren fired. In the parking lot, Marty is accosted by Darren. Marty apologizes for the losses Darren has suffered but Darren is not placated. Marty soon calls the building manager and tries to get Darren fired. Sally and Chris meet with two young women trying to make a business out of selling video games for girls. Taking notice of the competence Chris shows on the video games for girls software company, Sally makes him the co-lead on the deal. After hearing of Sally's marriage, Adam decides to join the high-speed rail company full-time. Niko's son bites his teacher. In the elevator, Chris offers to help Niko out with her son. At home, Grant tries to download his personality to a powerful computer. When Marty visits, Grant does not allow him inside of the apartment. Grant later finishes downloading his personality to the computer and begins testing it. Ziggy cries when Marty lays into her for her trading performance for the month. Mike intervenes and takes her away from the trading floor. Later, during dinner at Mike's family's house, Ziggy leaves the table upset after spilling a drink on the table. When Mike follows her outside, she tells him about the hit and run. With help from some of Mike's friends, Ziggy submits a statement to the police regarding the hit and run. After an argument on the floor, Marty and Mike nearly come to physical blows. When Marty rises quickly, Niko get frightened and hits him. Hoping to give himself a stronger case to the building management to fire Darren, Marty takes a golf club and uses it to smash the window of his vehicle. When Ian learns that the biotechnology company him and Paul are working with have developed a strain of Anthrax that there is currently no antidote for, he tells Paul who has no scruples about dealing with a company that could be manufacturing a biological weapon. At lunch, Adam tries to tell Sally that he is leaving by telling her the consulting and banking is too heavy a workload. Thinking that he means he will drop the consulting, she responds by telling him that, much to his surprise, she plans to leave GRC to move to Chicago. Overjoy at finally becoming the head of GRC, he congratulates her again on her marriage. She later announces her leave of absence to the executive committee. While doing so, Paul, who is in close contact with M.J., arrives late with a going away present. With Sally gone, it leaves Paul as second in command at GRC and M.J. as acting director at Epona. When Grant asks the computer with his downloaded computer personality how it is today, the computer responds by saying it is alone. The building management calls Marty to report that Darren has been fired after his car was broken into. When Niko's son bites him while he is reading a story, Chris bites him back. The two of them show signs of bonding. Before leaving for her honeymoon, as a last dig against Adam, Sally uses her shoe to remove the letters h, a, and m from the firm's logo at the entrance, making it Gardner, Ross, Cunning. At the end, Mike, Marty and Ziggy break into Grant's apartment to find him collapsed on the floor.
83	13	"Nice Guys Finish Last"	Peter Mitchell	Peter Mitchell	March 9, 2000
The episode begins with an exchange between Marty and his wife indicating that their future of their marriage is uncertain. Ben and Sally are enjoying life together on Ben's ranch. During a board meeting, Ian announces that GRC's Dunnage Motors investment will be recouped with the sale to a Japanese firm. Adam responds that the bank will not dole out rewards for projects that only break even. After receiving an offer from Denise, Ian decides to leave GRC to become the CFO for Dunnage. After the board meeting, Marty asks Adam for permission to offer Grant, who has already accepted his severance package, his old job back. In a session with a psychiatrist, it is revealed that Grant has a borderline personality disorder prone to fits of rage and moments of delusion. When on an anti-psychotic drug, Grant begins to feel normal so the psychiatrist offers him a prescription to the drug. While checking out Sally's office as the place for an office of her own, M.J. discovers that Adam has been using it as a room for Matthew. He states that, until he decides who is worthy of the office, Sally's old office is Matthew's room. Marty receives a disturbing gift-wrapped effigy of himself. Alan Greenspan makes an announcement that causes a large unexpected downward move in the market but Marty refuses to unload positions at a loss when they are down 10%. The corporate finance staff, including Sally who is at Ben's ranch, all work frantically to provide reassurances their clients in the face of the market panic. Grant returns to the firm to help out. Marty works himself up to the point where he collapses on the trading floor. Adam gets a visit from an investigator who warns that knowingly selling biological weapons is punishable by imprisonment. When interrogated, Paul denies knowing that the biotechnology company he financed was making biological weapons. When asked if Ian might have known, he states that he doubts Ian would knowingly involve himself in a biological weapons deal but raises the investigator's suspicions by hinting that Ian will be leaving the firm soon. The investigator advises that Ian find a good lawyer and takes him to the police station for questioning. After markets close, Marty stays on the floor. Grant offers to watch Asian markets for him but he urges Grant to go home before confiding that his wife has left him. The following day, the firm's losses rise to $29M. Niko invites Chris to spend the evening with her and her son, implying their relationship will start again. Mike tells Marty that the police picked up Darren for shoplifting. Knowing of Sally's feelings toward Ian and will fly back to Toronto to help him, Adam does not mention that he is being held by the police. Soon after making bail, Ian returns to the firm and quickly confronts Paul, physically assaulting him. Adam rushes into the office, pulls Ian away from Paul and assures him that GRC's lawyers will get Ian out of trouble. After the trading day has finished, while waiting outside Grant allows a disguised Tonya into the building. She finds her way to the trading floor where Marty is and begins by expressing her sorrow for Marty's presumably bad trading day and apologizing for yelling at him when they last met. As she begins to cry, he comforts her with a hug. While holder her, she pulls a knife out of her purse and stabs him in the back. As Grant and Ziggy are exiting the elevator to the trading floor, she rushes past them into the elevator. When they arrive at the trading floor, they find Marty in a pool of blood. While Marty is at the hospital in critical condition, Adam makes Niko the head trader. We learn that Tonya killed herself soon after. When M.J. informs Niko that she has recommended her to replace Marty as head trader if he cannot return to work, M.J. threatens to beat her. Niko then sends Ziggy out to find Grant who blames himself for letting Tonya in. When Ziggy finds him at the hospital, she tell him to stop blaming himself and encourages him to start taking his medication again. With a young child, Niko declines the head trader position. Sally returns to Ben's ranch. In Marty's hospital room, Barb tells him they need to finish their fight. He responds by saying that he is finished. It is uncertain whether he survives the stabbing or not.
