= Traders season 1 =

Traders
- Season 1
- No. of episodes: 13

Release
- Original network: Global Television Network
- Original release: February 1, 1996

Season chronology
- Next → Season 2

This is a list of episodes for Traders, a Canadian television drama series, which was broadcast on Global Television Network from 1996 to 2000. The show was set in a Bay Street investment bank, Gardner Ross. Bruce Gray and Sonja Smits starred as the firm's senior partners, Adam Cunningham and Sally Ross. The cast also included Patrick McKenna, Janet Bailey, David Cubitt, Rick Roberts, Kim Huffman, Chris Leavins, Gabriel Hogan, David Hewlett, Peter Stebbings and Alex Carter.

== Cast ==
=== Main ===
- Sonja Smits as Sally Ross
- David Cubitt as Jack Larkin
- Bruce Gray as Adam Cunningham
- Patrick McKenna as Marty Stephens
- Kim Huffman as Ann Krywarik
- David Hewlett as Grant Jansky
- Janet Bailey as Susannah Marks
- Rick Roberts as Donald D'Arby
- Terri Hawkes as Monika Barnes
- Ron Gabriel as Benny Siedleman
- Philip Akin as Carl Davison

== Episodes ==
No. overall	No. in season	Title	Directed by	Written by	Original release date
1	1	"Options"	Kari Skogland	David Shore and Jack Blum & Sharon Corder	February 1, 1996
Jack Larkin, a Vancouver-based trader with Gardner Ross, shows up at their Toronto office with a plan to move from the trading floor into corporate finance. He meets with Cedric Ross, the eponymous controlling shareholder of Gardner Ross, who initially balks at the idea of making him an investment banker but agrees to further consideration if Jack can land a coveted mining company IPO (Initial Public Offering) for firm. Jack hustles to find the location of a poker game that the owner of Graykirk Mining, Gerald Graykirk, is playing and bribes his way into the game. During the poker game Jack connects with Gerald Graykirk and, while sharing a limousine ride later, convinces him to let Gardiner Ross lead the IPO. Despite an attempt to undermine the deal by Adam, Gardner Ross leads the Graykirk IPO, taking 40% of the $300M issue but endangers its ability to survive to do so. The firm only survives the offering with some deft (and questionable) market maneuvering led by Jack and the head trader, Marty Stephens. As per his deal with Sally, Jack becomes a director of Gardner Ross. After ignoring a securities commission investigator, Cedric Ross is dramatically arrested at the firm for embezzlement. In detention, it is implied that since Ross previously had dealings with the judge who refused to grant him bail on the grounds that he might be a flight risk, his lawyer might be justified in arguing that judicial bias is the cause for his bail to be denied. Later, while still in prison, Cedric Ross has a heart attack. Back at Gardner Ross, the directors of the firm are discussing an offer from a larger investment bank when the economist daughter of Cedric, Sally Ross, enters. Her father has transferred his controlling share of the firm to her to prevent Adam Cunningham from selling Gardner out to a larger investment bank.
2	2	"Pennies from Heaven"	Alan Taylor	Story by : Tim Southam and Jack Blum & Sharon Corder; Teleplay by : Jack Blum & Sharon Corder and David Shore	1996
At the beginning of the show, Marty fires several of the trading staff after they leave the floor in response to a fire alarm while in the midst of executing a large trade. Jack approaches Navadyne, a GPS company with highly marketable technology products but lacking management expertise and capital to meet demand for its products. In looking for a suitable investor for Navadyne, Jack finds the perfect match in an aviation company owned by a recluse. When Jack and Donald D'Arby show up at his office, he refuses to see them but learn that he is a client of Ann Krywarik at Gardner Ross. Ann, who wants a new desk, initially refuses to help Jack access her client until Jack challenges her to a game of pool. If he wins, she will introduce him to her reclusive client. If she wins, he will get her a new desk. The following day, Jack gets a pool lesson from his father. When they play, Ann is about to win when Jack suckers her into a side bet causing her to lose. Later on, they manage to convince Ann's eccentric client to buy Navadyne. Jack and Ann begin a relationship soon after. Sally asks Marty to curtail practices on the trading floor to avoid any securities commission inquiries until her father has been cleared of charges but Marty refuses. Adam uses an old contact to get $25M of a British railroad privatization offering for the firm but the issue does not include a market out clause. Marty wants Benny Siedleman, an aging floor trader and his former boss to join his desk traders but Adam refuses. Sally later offers to move Benny from the trading floor to a trading desk on the condition that Marty cuts down on his questionable transactions to avoid any further scrutiny from the securities commission.
3	3	"Bad is Good"	Kari Skogland	David Shore	1996
Cedric is offered a plea bargain by the prosecution. Doubting that the prosecution's case is strong, he rejects it. At the end of the episode, Sally figures out that the securities commission made an illegal search and seizure in obtaining evidence on her father and the case against him is dropped. The firm decides to restrict trading in Navadyne, a GPS company, while Marty has a large short position. Rather than face serious and potentially unlimited losses as the stock rises, Marty defies orders and covers the short position anyway. Donald informs Adam that the British rail offer does not have a market out clause, meaning that the price is guaranteed by Gardner Ross. As the price of British rail drops, the firm loses money. Adam later punches a hole in the wall of his office when he finds out. The reclusive aviation company owner changes his mind about Navadyne when he learns of the management problems it has. Unknown to Jack, Navadyne has used another investment bank to raise more capital with a rights issue. Furious when he finds out, Jack tells them that they need management more than cash. Jack returns to the reclusive aviation company owner and offers him a bought deal where Gardner Ross shoulders all of the risk but finds out that the firm cannot legally meet that capital requirements because of losses on British rail. In order to raise capital quickly, Jack finds a brilliant but socially awkward derivatives trader name Grant Jansky and hires him. Jack gives Grant 3 hours to make $1.8M so the firm can legally underwrite the bought deal he offered the reclusive aviation company owner.
4	4	"The King Is Dead..."	Alan Taylor	Story by : Mark Shekter; Teleplay by : David Shore	1996
Ben is moved from the trading floor at the exchange to a trading desk at the firm as Sally promised. After having lost the case the against Cedric, the securities commission puts Gardner Ross under further scrutiny. In doing so, they uncover Marty's trades in the Navadyne while it was restricted. Susannah Marks, the firm's analyst, suspects a company's reported financial numbers are cooked and resists pressure from the others to make a buy recommendation. Sally backs her. They later find out she was right. Susannah gets a call from an accented man claiming that a recommendation she made cause him to lose money. He threateningly tells her to make a positive recommendation on a construction company. Susannah finds a funds transfer document that has been misfiled and gives it to Sally. After seeing it Sally goes to a ministry that her father allegedly embezzled funds from to talk to the Reverend, who is under RCMP surveillance. The securities commission calls Jack in on his day off for questioning. In answering their questions, he intentionally misleads them. After obtaining a search warrant, the securities commission's ensuing investigation disrupts the firm's day-to-day operations. Gardner Ross knows the investigation will not stop until the securities commission finds something prosecutable so they allow the commission to suspend Marty to halt the ongoing investigation. Marty is suspended for 30 days to avoid having them investigate the firm further. In a walk together, Cedric tells Sally that he didn't embezzle the money, he earned it. After Cedric returns to the firm and admits to Sally that he and the Reverend embezzled the funds, she refuses to return control of Gardner Ross to him. At the end of the episode, Cedric publicly announces his retirement. Jack's father is diagnosed with lung cancer.
5	5	"...Long Live The King"	Kari Skogland	Tim Southam	1996
A European pulp mill approaches Gardner Ross to acquire Donald's family's forestry company. Since Donald is the firm's resource industry specialist, the directors decide they cannot do the deal without him. Donald initially refuses to participate in structuring the bid for his family's firm but Jack forces him to work on the acquisition. Jack and Donald meet with a major Montreal pension fund that holds shares in Donald's family's forestry firm. Donald's father is unexpectedly present at the meeting. The shareholders initially tell them they will not sell their stake to the bidder and Jack gets up to leave the meeting. Before he leaves, Donald asks the shareholder if he would be interested in shares of the pulp and paper firm. When the fund replies that they would, Donald proposes a deal structure that would include a provision allowing him to swap shares of his father's firm for shares in the acquiring firm. The shareholders point out that since the acquiring firm is foreign and the shareholder's fund cannot invest more than 20% of its holdings in foreign equities, the share swap would push the value of the fund's foreign holdings above 20% so they are not interested in a swap. Donald shows how he could create a structure to get around the 20% maximum foreign equity restriction. Donald's father responds by pointing out that his firm has a money losing mill in Quebec that would likely be shut down if taken over by the foreign firm. He offers to guarantee that the money losing mill will be kept open for 3 years if the fund retains its shares in his company. The employee pension fund agrees not to sell its stake. Before he leaves, his father tells him to move out of the family home. Adam and Sally make Benny head trader for the duration of Marty's absence but, due to his computer illiteracy, new environment and lack of experience, he is ineffective. Benny gets caught taking orders from Marty and is stripped of his position as temporary head trader. He is replaced by Chris. Susannah ignores a faxed threat but Monika Barnes, the research assistant, shows it to Sally who, despite Susannah's objections, hires a bodyguard for her. Susannah receives another threat over the telephone. At the end of the episode, Susannah's daughter is kidnapped for a few minutes and taken to the firm by a stranger with instructions to tell her: "There is always more than one target." Marty is bored at home but while watching TV, he notices a news story that might be material to the traders and calls Benny to tell him about it. Benny acts on the story. Marty breaks his suspension by illegally feeding trading ideas to Benny.
6	6	"From Russia with Love"	George Mendeluk	Sharon Corder & Jack Blum	1996
The show begins with the police investigating threats against Susannah and her family. Susannah is advised by the police to stay home. The firm's traders do not know about the extortion attempt and proceed to speculate on why she is not at work. To the irritation of the officer investigating Susannah's case, Adam pulls rank on him to in an attempt to ensure the case gets special attention. While at home, Susannah wrestles with her dilemma on whether or not to cave in to the extortionist's demands. Adam dumps a record company IPO he expects to be a money loser on Jack and asks Grant to find a way for the firm to hedge itself on the record company offering. After insulting the lead broker for the record company IPO, Jack later approaches him with a request to restructure the deal. After failing with the lead on the record company deal, Jack and Donald approach the company directly with their deal restructuring proposal. As soon as the record company starts trading, the firm's traders, who see it as a dog, sell it as quickly as they can. As the stock price of the record company rises, the position that Adam ordered Grant to set up to bet on its fall loses money quickly. Ann is approached by a new but potentially high-risk client that Jack met at a poker game. Later, the wife of Ann's new client meets with her to tell her that her husband is an unemployed compulsive gambler. Ann later decides not to place the high-risk call options order he gave her. As it rises, she becomes distraught and runs to Jack for consolation. After the compulsive gambler's call drops in value, he angrily storms the trading floor when he finds out the value of the call option he asked Ann to place would have caused huge losses. Chris receives a recommendation from Monika and takes an opposite course of action to what she recommended. Adam later dresses Chris down for not following her recommendation. Sally discovers some unusual buying activity in the stock of the company the extortionist told Susannah to recommend. She approaches the executing broker to reveal the name of the client but he refuses. At Sally's behest, Monika looks through investment newsletters for situations where an analyst has reversed his recommendation in a short time frame and finds another analyst at another firm who has probably been extorted. Sally meets the analyst but he refuses to admit any extortion has taken place. Later, he arranges a private night meeting in a park with Susannah. The extortionist is a Russian mobster. The other analyst tells Susannah that he initially did not comply with the mobsters until they broke his leg. Ann discovers a biotechnology firm that might be able to help treat Jack's father's lung cancer.
7	7	"Dancing with Mr. D."	Alex Chapple	Hart Hanson	1996
Chris and Benny get into a fistfight on the trading floor. In response, Adam demotes Chris from head trader. While Susannah is working late at night, she hears an unexpected sound after her bodyguard has gone to the kitchen for coffee. When she goes to investigate, she is frightened by Jack and sprays him with pepper spray in her surprise. The following morning, she decides to cave in to the Russian mobsters and make the false recommendation but Sally decides to hire the broker who made the suspicious trades so they can find out who the extortionist is. Apart from Adam, all shareholders of the firm vote to purchase the extortionist's broker's firm at 4 times its value so they can uncover the identity of the extortionist. Before they are able to make the purchase, Adam meets with the owner of the extortionist's firm and offers to pay him the market value of the firm in cash but with the understanding that the money will be used to invest in a company as directed by Adam that will result in a payoff higher than the asking price of the extortionist's firm on the condition that the extortionist's broker never become part of Gardner Ross. The extortionist's broker accepts the offer. With the broker's client list, members of the firm figure out who the extortionist is and report it to the police but they do not have enough evidence to take any action. When Susannah relents again, Adam threatens to make a press release stating that her changed recommendation resulted from extortion. The extortionist appears at Gardner Ross after hours and threatens Susannah's family again. After seeing this, Jack approaches a more powerful gangster he inadvertently laundered money for in Vancouver for help. When the more powerful gangster offers to help in exchange for an unspecified favor at an unspecified time, Jack and Susannah leave. Susannah decides to get a gun. The extortionist humbly tells Susannah that he will not longer harass her and her family. Realizing that Jack, at some risk to himself, intervened by returning to the more powerful mobster to ask for help, Susannah thanks him. Unfortunately their victory is bittersweet. Her husband moves for a separation. At his wife's request, Marty joins group therapy for men who have lost their jobs. He ridicules them at first but the therapist appears to reach Marty when he suggests that Marty wasn't popular in high school and lost his virginity late. When Marty gets home from therapy later, he is more reflective. During his suspension, Marty contemplates a career change. The following morning at the director's meeting, Marty announces that he will not be returning to the firm. While Adam and Sally wish Marty well on his change in direction while standing in view of the trading floor, Marty begins to miss being a trader and changes his mind. He negotiates better employment terms and agrees to return to the trading floor. Jack introduces his father to a doctor from a biotechnology firm who is working on an experimental treatment for his condition but, due to the expense, the firm has not clinically tested the treatment on humans. Jack later sleeps with his father's new doctor. The doctor from the biotechnology firm agrees to go public to raise money for further testing of her drug. Jack later learns from his father that tests of the drug had been done on humans in Europe. Jack confronts the doctor over the death of a patient during a trial of her experimental drug, a fact she had not disclosed to him and Donald. She tells him that, unknown to him, she has already begun administering the drug to his father. Jack decides not to take her company public. Jack later has a change of heart decides to continue with the biotechnology IPO. Jack's father tells him that he's proud of him for closing what he considers a meaningful deal. Grant figures out that there will be a tragedy in Guatemala and tells Chris who proceeds to trade on speculation of disaster there. As Grant predicted, disaster strikes in Guatemala. When he finds out Chris only used the information to make a profitable trade and did not warn the authorities, Grant angrily punches him.
8	8	"Into that Good Night"	George Mendeluk	Robert Sandler & Allen Booth	1996
As Marty returns to the trading floor after his 30-day suspension, Jack is rushing his father to the hospital emergency ward suffering from flu symptoms. Chris uses a handicapped parking sticker from a car inherited from his grandfather and brags about it. The firm's legal counsel tells Chris he received a call from the securities commission about him using his deceased grandfather's parking sticker. Adam later calls Chris into his office to tell him that the commission will be investigating his use of the handicapped parking sticker. During the discussion, Adam decides they will tell the securities commission that Chris temporarily lost his mind. Near the end of the episode, Chris is called into a meeting with a man in a wheelchair supposedly from the securities commission over his use of the disabled parking sticker. Unknown to him, the whole firm is watching and the disabled parking sticker investigation is a prank set up by Marty. After being humiliated, Chris decides to quit until Marty changes his mind but soon after Marty plays another prank on Chris by handcuffing him to a door. In Jack's absence, Sally, who has no investment banking experience, tries to handle an acquisition by herself but she is rudely blown off by the client because she has no street reputation as an investment banker. After some positive encouragement from Donald, Sally decides to further pursue the prospective client who had rudely dismissed her. Encouraged, she discovers that the prospect sits on the board of a symphony orchestra charity and becomes a member of the orchestra fund-raising committee with a donation. Sally meets with the prospect who had blown her off earlier at the symphony charity event and after intimating that she will handle either the takeover or the defense, successfully arranges a meeting for the following day. While there, Sally introduces herself to a conductor named Anton and asks him out for dinner. During Marty's suspension, the firm has lost many large clients. In order to regain stature, Marty begins accumulating shares in a telecommunications firm that he knows a large client will need to buy that day before he expects to receive the order from the client. Alarmed at the size of the position Marty has built on margin, Adam orders Marty to call the large client but is rebuffed. Not long after, Marty calls the client who buys the block from him but Gardner Ross loses on the trade. Marty asserts that the loss was necessary to restore his reputation. Susannah's husband sues for custody of their child. Jack's father goes into a coma. As per his father's request, Jack visits his sister Cathy to give her a ring that belonged to their mother. Not long before passing on, Jack's father briefly comes out of a coma and expresses his love for him.
9	9	"Rumours"	E. Jane Thompson	Tim Southam	1996
While watching the director's meeting, Benny uses his lip-reading skills to find out that they plan to fire staff thus touching off mass speculation amongst staff members. When asked by Monika, Susannah assures her that she will not be laid off. Meanwhile, Adam hires a termination consultant to help the firm avoid any lawsuits from laid off employees. Grant interrupts the executive meeting with the termination consultant and asks that he be the first to be laid off but since his activities are highly profitable to the firm, they refuse. In order to save his job, Chris shorts the Danish Krona and then starts a rumor about Denmark holding a referendum on withdrawing from the European Union with a less reputable wire service. Unknown to Chris, Benny piggybacks and both earn a profit making it less likely that either will be laid off. Jack is away from the firm attending to his father's affairs. Sally's first investment banking client threatens to pull her takeover bid unless Gardner Ross can increase her stake in the takeover target from 3% to 10% by the end of the day, a near impossible request to fulfill. Marty finds someone who holds a large block of the pipeline company they are bidding on. The holder is a friend of Adam's so at the request of the other directors, Adam takes him out to lunch to encourage him to sell his stake. As soon as Adam leaves the executive committee meeting with the termination consultant, the others vote to terminate her. In an effort to land an investment banking deal of his own and avoid being laid off, Donald gives a prospective client who wants to build a UFO sanctuary on some land he owns consideration but Jack instructs Donald to blow him off. Despite Jack's orders to drop the deal, Donald commits the firm to it. Monika suggest that Donald structure the UFO sanctuary deal as a UFO theme park to make it more palatable to prospective investors. When Donald tells Jack of his idea to pitch the deal as a UFO theme park instead of a sanctuary, Jack reconsiders. After losing several clients, Ann goes to Grant for help hoping he might be able to figure out what they all have in common. To her surprise, he tells her that they all dined at the same private club together that day. He knows because he visited a friend who was working in the kitchen that day. Grant tries to get laid off by losing money but ends up earning money for the firm instead. During a debate on who will be laid off, Adam announces to the other directors that the friend he had lunch with who owns a large block of the target pipeline company has agreed to sell it at a dollar over the market price. He also informs Sally that he expects half of her advisory fee for helping her. Just as the trading floor is about to begin a stealth buy of the pipeline, the share price starts to rise, indicating that someone leaked the upcoming takeover bid. Sally asks Marty to start a rumor that she is handling the takeover hoping that the share price will not be bid up so quickly. The UFO sanctuary prospect is angered by Donald's theme park proposal. Donald wants to announce the failed deal to the board but Jack doesn't want him to because Donald's estranged father could prevent him from getting another job in the industry. To protect Donald's job, Jack lies to Adam telling him that Donald is gay and therefore a lawsuit risk in the case of dismissal. Monika and a trader get laid off. Angered by the leak, Sally's bidder storms the trading floor and drops the deal. After talking to Grant, the UFO sanctuary client warms up to the firm.
10	10	"The Enemy Within"	George Mendeluk	David Cole	1996
The episode begins with the director's meeting to find out who leaked the pipeline bid they lost in the previous episode. In response, they decide to enact tighter surveillance measures at the firm. Donald discovers that a bond trader at another firm bought shares in the pipeline before it was announced. Sally meets with the bond trader at a church. The bond trader tells her that, while having lunch in a clam restaurant, he heard a voice say that the pipeline company Sally's client was bidding on is going to be bought. Seeing nobody around him, he thought the voice came from God and proceeded to buy shares in the pipeline. Sally and Anton go to the restaurant where the bond trader who bought shares of the target pipeline company thought he heard voices from God. They discover an acoustic anomaly causing sound from one table to be clearly heard at another table. Sally asks the waiter to find out who was sitting at both tables the day that the bond trader thought he heard the voice God. In hopes that the employee with the most to lose will expose himself/herself as the leak, Adam announces mandatory drug testing even though it's illegal. Upset at the drug testing announcement, Ann confides to Benny that she doesn't want to take the urine test because she has something to hide. Later, in an effort to defend Ann, Benny makes an outburst on the trading floor over the rumored drug testing while Adam is watching, leading Adam to believe that Benny was the leak. Adam, Marty and a compliance officer are having a heated discussion because Adam, sure that he is the leak, wants to fire Benny when Sally intervenes after finding out that the trader who bought the pipeline after thinking he heard God's voice actually heard Adam at another table. Sally then forces Adam to acknowledge to the rest of the firm that he was the leak. Adam later issues a statement acknowledging his impropriety. Ann later thanks Benny for protecting her. Adam returns to the restaurant with the acoustic anomaly to listen in on conversations. Jack and Donald are approached by a Jewish man who wants to buy a company that made a catalytic agent that was used to rapidly decompose bodies, including those of his parents, during the Holocaust. His sole reason for wanting to buy the company is to dismantle it. Today, the catalytic agent is successfully sold as a composting product. Although the company was never tried, the grandson of the founders runs it today. When Jack and Donald come up with a way for their Jewish prospect to destroy the company he is targeting, he engages them. The Jewish client buys the target company's debt at a premium and then Jack commissions Susannah and the firm's lawyer to find a reason to send a receiver into the company. They discover that the company went above their debt to book equity ratio thereby putting them in breach of a loan agreement before the Jewish client bought their debt. Since the previous debt holder did not waive the breach, it gives the new debt holder the right to send the company into receivership but after visiting the company that his client intends to destroy, seeing how well it treats its employees and realizing that those employees are innocent of any wrongdoing, Jack has second thoughts about destroying the firm. Jack tells the grandson of the company founder that their real intent is to destroy his company and then proposes an alternative plan involving a transfer of the catalytic agent patent to his client instead of destroying the company but the grandson rudely dismisses him. Although the catalytic agent company has hundreds of employees, they do not employ any Blacks or Asians. They also were the subject of a complaint alleging unfair employment practices recently. While they are discussing this, a Gardner Ross lawyer enters with an injunction filed by the catalytic agent company on the grounds that the receiver was appointed in bad faith. Jack is required to appear in court the following morning. In court, Jack lies under oath and later puts the company into receivership. Marty pressures Chris to get rid of a stock he has a large position in. Unable to offload it to any of his institutional clients, Chris tricks Ann into getting one of her retail clients to buy some. Ann later confronts him after her client transfers his account as a result of significant losses. The client Chris caused Ann to lose returns to her. Jack's sister Cathy, who has been laid off, shows up at the firm to ask him for a job. In order to help her, Jack asks Susannah to hire his sister. While at the clam restaurant, Anton confesses to Sally that he is married, putting an end to their relationship.
11	11	"Sharper Than a Serpent's Tooth"	Holly Dale	Sondra Kelly	1996
The episode begins with the directors discussing a bank offer. When Sally suggests that she is in favor of accepting the offer, Jack responds that he will resign as soon as the takeover occurs. Later, the acquiring bank stipulates that either Adam or Jack must stay with Gardner Ross for the deal to go through but Adam refuses the 3 year lock in period. Adam tries to convince Jack to take the bank offer and agree to the lock in period, but he refuses. Adam asks a competing investment banker named Ian to join Gardner Ross so the deal with the acquiring bank can go through without Adam having to stay for 3 years. When Ian tells him that Jack's sister bought the target cosmetics firm on insider information, Adam decides to blackmail Jack into staying but it doesn't work. Jack forces his sister to quit instead. During a shareholder's meeting adjourned to vote on the bank's bid, Sally does an about-face and votes against accepting the bid. She suggests going public to increase the firm's capital base and acquire a merchant bank. At the end of the episode, upset that the bank will not be acquired and he will have to continue in the business for longer, Adam is consoled by his ailing wife. Jack and Donald agree to handle a leveraged buyout of a cosmetics firm owned by the mother of the hostile bidder. While Gardner Ross is acquiring shares of the target cosmetics firm on behalf of its client, one of the suppliers of the target cosmetics firm acts as a white knight by also making takeover bid of the cosmetics firm. The white knight supplier is run by the godson of the bidder's mother whose firm is targeted. In response to the competing bid for her mother's firm, the daughter raises her bid. Confused and frustrated, Jack asks Sally for help. Sally immediately decides to start buying shares in the acquiring cosmetics supplier as a bluff. The bluff works when the supplier withdraws the bid for the cosmetics company. Later, Sally sets up a meeting between mother and daughter and between Jack and Ian, the competing banker. When Sally leaves the women alone, they work out their differences and decide to jointly acquire the cosmetics supplier. When his computer crashes, Grant falls for a female technician named Magda who fixes it. She feels the same way but, with him being socially awkward, he does not know how to ask her out so he sabotages the firm's network so he can see her again. When she arrives, with Donald's assistance, he asks her out. After she agrees, he restores the network. Cathy tries to interest members of the firm in shares of a company that makes macaroni dinners that she likes. Susannah ignores her but Chris profits from buying stock in the company. Claiming to have accepted a higher paying job at another firm, Cathy quits.
12	12	"The Big Picture"	Alan Taylor	Alyson Feltes	1996
Gardner Ross hires a competing investment bank to handle its IPO. After a reception for potential investors, the investment bank handling the IPO claims that investors do not think Sally is experienced enough to be head of the firm. He asks her to make Adam head of the firm but she refuses. Face time with potential investors reveals that they are less receptive to Sally as head of the firm. Later, during an executive meeting, she relents and asks Adam to lead the firm. Unwilling to agree to a lock-in period due to her fragile marriage, Susannah asks Monika to return as head of research and agree to a lock-in period in her place to make the IPO more appealing to investors. Monika doesn't give her an answer because she has received an offer from a competing firm. After the competing investment bank withdraws Monika's offer, she suspects Susannah influenced the withdrawal and angrily turns down the offer from Gardner Ross but later changes her mind. Susannah decides to let her husband have custody over their daughter. Monika decides not to head the research department. Marty temporarily tries to hide currency trading losses. During a reception for potential investors, Sally learns about Marty's losses from his intoxicated wife, Barb Stephens. Cathy's lawyer gives the firm until an hour before it goes public to settle her lawsuit. Since, a pending lawsuit will have a negative impact on the IPO and both firms are implicated in her insider trades, the investment banker handling the IPO asks Jack to hire his sister back. He points out that Jack can always fire her again later. Jack visits her at her home and hires her back. After Donald dates Grant's love interest, Grant quits. Donald follows him into a tree in a park in the middle of winter to tell Grant he will not see her again and ask for Grant's forgiveness. Grant accepts. They get stuck together in a tree and have to call the fire department to get down. Meanwhile, the newly floated Gardner Ross stock has started trading and is dropping precipitously on the news that Grant has quit. Later, in an e-mail to his love interest, he encourages her to date Donald. The episode ends with Cedric and Adam walking together. Cedric tells Adam that he has bought shares of Gardner Ross and hints of plans to buy more.
13	13	"The Enemy Without"	Alan Goluboff	David Shore	1996
Cedric takes Sally by surprise by showing up for a board meeting after purchasing 10% of the firm in the IPO. Adam motions to give Cedric a seat on the board but Sally objects. The others vote and the motion fails. Sally and her father have a lunch meeting where she explains why she does not want him on the executive board. Jack asks Donald to spy on his sister Cathy. Later, while making a phone call from Cathy's desk, he notices a scheduled an appointment with another bank. While watching her, Donald sees Cathy put something from one of the firm's files into her purse and gets suspicious. After Susannah sends Cathy to the library, Donald takes her purse and finds a confidential document inside. Grant and Donald go to the address on Cathy's desk only to find a dumpster and dive in expecting to find something incriminating. When she shows up at the dumpster, they realize she has tricked them. While spying on Cathy, Donald feigns interest in a rubber company and uncovers a deal opportunity. He later approaches the owner of the rubber processing company about taking it public. In his absence, he asks Grant to watch Cathy. When he returns, Susannah gets annoyed at Donald's constant presence in her office. When Donald discusses the deal with Susannah, she thinks it's too early for an IPO. Sally meets with the 21-year-old head of a merchant bank to make a purchase offer. Susannah's due diligence uncovers several private placements that the merchant bank has that are valued at cost and not market value, making the target more valuable than their offer for it. Cedric sells his block of Gardner Ross and meets with the target merchant bank to discuss investing in them. He has no interest in merchant banking but wants to buy them so that Gardner Ross cannot. When Sally meets again with the head of the merchant bank, she discovers that her father's bid includes an off table offer for the bank. While Cedric has a lower official bid for the bank, his offer includes an untraceable cash component that will not be taxed. In order to raise money quickly, Adam and Sally approach Grant. Instead of getting into a bidding war with Cedric, the directors attempt to hire the bank's star banker. Jack goes to the merchant bank but is ignored by the key merchant banker he hopes to retain. When Jack makes the star banker an offer, he discovers that the target merchant bank already has her locked in for 5 years. Jack follows the star merchant banker to a meeting with a potential buyer to pitch one of her client's products. Much to her chagrin, Jack promises the buyer to make some product modifications that will be difficult to fulfill. In an effort to correct his earlier mistake, Jack poses as a retailer from the west coast and meets a different person at the company he pitched earlier to buy the product. While there, he discovers that the merchant banker he is pursuing did the same thing earlier. While talking after a game of squash, Adam updates Cedric on the firm's strategy. Adam tells Cedric that Grant is making enough profit to outbid him for the merchant bank but then meets with Sally and tells her that Grant is making huge losses. During his meeting with Sally, he offers to sell some of his stock in Gardner Ross and loan the money back to the firm. They each sell 1/3 of their holdings in the firm. Meanwhile, Grant is actually up about $1 million for the day. Jack and Sally later come to an agreement with the merchant bank. Gardner will get 51% of the merchant bank, the conditions will be waived, the 21-year-old gets a seat on Gardner's board, veto power and Jack cannot have anything to do with the star merchant banker's deals. Jack enters his office to find Janet Hamilton, the star merchant banker sitting at his desk with the intention of renegotiating the terms of her contract, which she finds restrictive. Although Gardner brings money to the table, it doesn't bring any deals. Donald, who is in the room realizes that the rubber processing plant might be a more appropriate deal for a merchant bank and gives it to her. When the price of Gardner drops as a result of their inflated bid for the merchant bank, Cedric starts buying Gardner. Sally orders the firm to buy Gardner stock to defend her position from her father's takeover bid. When Chris tells her that they have almost used up Grant's spectacular profits, she realizes that Adam had lied to her and had been working with her father behind her back all along. The firm quickly runs out of capital and Cedric regains a controlling stake. He fires Sally at the next board meeting. Jack quits with her.
