= Traders season 3 =

Traders
- Season 3
- No. of episodes: 22

Release
- Original network: CBC Television
- Original release: 1997 – 1998

Season chronology
- ← Previous; Season 2 Next → Season 4

The third season of the Canadian television series Traders consisted of 22 episodes.

For the third season only, the show was repeated on CBC Television after its airing on Global.

== Cast ==
=== Main ===
- Sonja Smits as Sally Ross
- David Cubitt as Jack Larkin
- Bruce Gray as Adam Cunningham
- Patrick McKenna as Marty Stephens
- Kim Huffman as Ann Krywarik
- Rick Roberts as Donald D'Arby
- Ron Gabriel as Benny Siedleman
- David Hewlett as Grant Jansky
- Chris Leavins as Chris Todson

== Episodes ==
No. overall	No. in season	Title	Directed by	Written by	Original release date
27	1	"Dark Sanctuary"	Alex Chapple	Hart Hanson	1997
Jack has sold his condominium and has been sleeping in his office. In defending the takeover, the firm has lost so much capital that most of the firm's staff have left or been fired. The executive committee tries to come up with recapitalization scenarios. Before the committee meeting is over, the police arrive to arrest Jack. In court to enter his plea, Jack notices David Astin in the courtroom. Jack's outbursts in court prompt the judge to give him three days in jail, after which he must enter his plea. Marty and Benny have a trading idea but cannot execute it due to the firm's low capital position. Sally visits the trading floor later to assure the skeletal staff that the firm will not go under. When Marty ridicules her, she demands that he hire a foreign exchange trader by the following day. Marty convinces Chris to return. While a financial TV show announces that Adam made $12 million speculating on the large bank's stock, Sally suggests that the judge's dislike for Jack might have been prearranged as if someone might have influenced the choice of judge to hear Jack's case. Adam tells her he actually made $15 million on the trade and shows surprise when he hears that David Astin was in the court. In jail, Jack is harassed by another inmate. He soon gets into his first fight. Adam goes on a date with a woman who has close ties to a high-level government person who might be able to help recapitalized the firm if it can buy the debt of an airline name Algonquin Air. Expecting that he will be charged with assault and be barred from working in the securities industry as a result, Adam prepares to give Jack's office away. Adam offers Ian Farnham a job but he initially refuses. When he tells Ian that they have an airline debt issue in the works and suggests that he will get more experience from the ten-day deal than in 10 years of working in his current position, Ian becomes more interested. After Adam assures him that he is not making the offer as a favor to Ian's mother, Ian becomes even more amenable. Sally and Grant later visit him in jail but Jack is unwilling to help her find a way to re-capitalize and suggests she asks Donald for help. When Grant sees a woman who was talking to the inmate who beat Jack up crying, he offers her a handkerchief. Later, Grant suggest to Cathy that they try to get Jack out of jail but she refuses to help. While in jail, Jack suspects that there is a conspiracy against him. He decides to plead guilty. When Benny overhears Marty making job interview arrangements, he points out that the firm cannot survive without Marty. Grant asks Ann to help her get Jack out of jail. The two of them meet the inmate who beat up Jack along with the inmate's lawyer to offer his wife a forgivable loan if he protects Jack for the remainder of his time in jail. Benny tells Sally of the day's events on the trading floor and also informs her that Marty has a dinner interview. Realizing that the firm has to do a deal in order to re-capitalize, she changes her mind on the Algonquin Air deal. In order to persuade Marty to sell Algonquin stock, she decides to offer him more money and a seat on the executive committee. Behind Adam's back, Sally approaches Ian's mother and promises to underwrite Algonquin if Ian's mother will be transparent about what Gardner will get in return for the deal. Later, Donald's analysis concludes that the only way to structure the Algonquin issue would be to use a high-yield convertible bond. While the two of them are working, Adam interrupts them to confront Sally over her communication with Ian's mother. He tells Sally that, in return for Algonquin, Gardner Ross will be the new fiscal agent for the maritime provinces, an arrangement that should bring in about $50 million per year. He then informs Sally that he has hired Ian to replace Jack while he's in jail. Jack's adversary inmate warns him to stay away. Later, the inmate confronts Jack but runs away when Jack doesn't back down. Before leaving prison, he tells Jack about the offer that Ann and Grant gave him. After looking at the preliminary Algonquin prospectus, Marty tells Sally that he could sell it but refuses to do so because he considers it beneath him. When Donald points out that it's on him to keep the firm together with Jack gone, he relents. Later, Marty tells the other members of the firm that, while he could sell the bond, it would kill its reputation. Ian advises him to make the issue sound overly complex and convince more junior salespeople that it's a sure bet but Marty still does not agree to sell it. Adam and Sally offer to make him a principal of the firm and member of the executive committee if he sells it. The issue does not go as well as hoped. Gardner has to subscribe to a half of it. In court later, Jack pleads not guilty. At the end of the episode, it is revealed that Adam and Ian's mother are intimate and that he has hired Ian as a favor to his mother.
28	2	"Some Lies, Mostly Secrets"	Keith Ross Leckie	Alyson Feltes	1997
Jack returns to find Ian in his office and forces both Donald and Ian to leave. Jack later receives a suspension notice from the investment dealer's association pending a conduct hearing. They decide to appeal the decision but, in the meantime, Jack cannot be at the offices of Gardner Ross. At the executive committee meeting, it is revealed that Gardner is stuck with $50 million of the Algonquin Air convertible debt. In order to avoid being liable for so much of the issue, they come up with a plan that could be construed as stock manipulation that Marty agrees to execute. After Marty leaves the meeting, they discuss finding a way to earn quick cash without incurring much overhead. Marty starts giving traders at other firms the impression that he has not sold 80% of Algonquin but then assigns Cathy to start buying its common stock. On the trading floor, Sally gets an idea for a deal after Marty explains why he is speculating on a tobacco stock and asks him to buy 9.9% of the company. At the next executive committee meeting Sally and Marty vote to take over a tobacco company since it generates a lot of cash. During a still later meeting, Donald tells Sally that he has a moral problem with the firm buying a tobacco company and suggests some software companies instead. At 18% ownership, Gardner Ross finds it odd that the tobacco company has not requested a meeting. Adam sets Ian up to speak with Ann to find out why. The meeting ends with Ann telling Ian to tell Adam that she appreciates his offer but she's not interested. Ian relays to Adam Ann's confirmation that the tobacco company is the type of cash generator that Sally thinks it is. On his own, Ian has learned that the reason the tobacco company did not arrange a meeting with Gardner is because their chairman plans to fight a takeover attempt. When Gardner calls a meeting with the tobacco company, they learn that the company plans to leave the tobacco business within three years. It plans to enter the less profitable but less litigious nutraceuticals industry. Sally ends the meeting by telling them that any attempts to diversify will be opposed by Gardner Ross. After the meeting, Adam, who directly opposes Sally's position on the tobacco company, asks Ian to find a way to come to some compromise with the tobacco company. At the end of the trading day, Adam, Benny and Marty think that they failed in their attempted takeover of the tobacco company. The following morning, Donald and Ian try to interest Adam in their plan for the tobacco company but since he expects the deal to falter, he does not give it much consideration. While Marty is trying to convince Sally to give up on their takeover, Adam enters to announce that the tobacco company wants to meet with Gardner Ross. Later on, while Gardner is negotiating with the tobacco company, Ann delivers shares accounting for 14% of the company, giving Gardner a controlling stake in the company. Later, at the executive meeting committee, Marty is infuriated at Sally's decision to bring Ann back to the firm. As Jack is about to leave the firm, Sally stops him. Although he cannot work at the firm's offices, after they take over Algonquin, she wants him to break up the company. After he physically confronts her, she asks the receptionist to collect his pass and keys. In response, Jack starts to hitchhike back to Vancouver but happens upon a Catholic priest at a truck stop. After talking, Jack decides not to run away. Jack later shows up at the firm, apologizes to Ian, asks Donald if he can stay on his couch and asks Sally for the Algonquin Air job. She gives him the job on the condition that he report the executive committee weekly. Feeling slighted by Adam's close relationship with Ian, Donald asks Adam if Ian is in line for his job but Adam assures him that it's not the case. Adam offers Ann a position as a proprietary trader. Knowing she will have difficulty winning the approval of other members of the firm, she refuses the offer until Adam divulges that, by the end of the year, he will have created a billion dollar mutual fund that he wants her to manage. When Sally and Ann meet away from the firm, Ann offers to get her a large block of the tobacco company stock in exchange for a position at the firm away from the trading floor. Sally takes her up on her offer.
29	3	"Nobody's Boy"	Gord Langevin	Ann MacNaughton	1997
A client of Adam's plans to build luxury condos on a hospital site where a clinic for women at risk currently stands, thereby forcing the women to travel far out of the city to go for help. Later on, during a meeting with a bureaucrat, Adam and his property developer client discover that there is a higher bid then theirs for the hospital they intend to turn into luxury condominiums. They infer that since the government did not take the higher bid, there must be something they do not understand. They decide to investigate the other bidder to find out why. The competing bid is $5M higher and comes from an American company that plans to turn the hospital into a highly profitable wellness center offering many services not covered by Canada's universal health care. They deduce that the reason why the government is being so slow to accept the American offer is that the services they offer would spell the end of universal health care. At the private club during a discussion with a politician in the sauna later, Adam is told that he will not be sitting at the head table with the UN Secretary General as promised before. When queried about the change, the politician points out that when he was promised head table before, the American company was not about to introduce two-tier medicine into Canada. It is revealed that Adam wants a UN posting so he promises to block the American health and wellness company's bid if he can get a seat at the head table. In a meeting with Donald and Sally later, Adam states that Gardner will need to increase their investment stake and lower fee to come up with the extra $5M required. Sally is not interested in further investing in a long-term deal with a relatively small yield and is skeptical of why Adam is so eager to finance it. Adam offers the doctor trying to save the women's clinic money to set up a new clinic but she replies that it's not enough until he explains that his client's bid was not accepted and her clinic is being evicted by an American health care company. As a result, the protesters turn their anger toward the government. After being accosted by the protesters, the same bureaucrat who originally refused them meets with Adam and Donald again. He agrees to accept their bid as long as it beats the rival bid. Adam also receives a golden invitation to the UN Secretary General dinner. Sally refuses to increase Gardner's exposure to the luxury condo project. She suggests co-opting a Canadian health group's deal into the condo developer's. When Adam is supposed to meet with the condo developers and the health concern, he feigns sickness and, thinking that Donald will mess up the meeting, asks him to attend in his place but Donald pulls off the deal. At another meeting later, the developer and the Canadian health care concern come to a joint agreement on the site that includes a provision for the women at risk clinic to stay at the site rent free. Afterward, Adam asks the clinic doctor out for dinner. At the UN Secretary General meeting later, Adam's politician contact tells him that building the health and wellness center will adversely affect his political aspirations. Adam responds that he has helped the politician by keeping the hospital health and wellness center Canadian and bought Canada's politicians time to come up with new rules for private health services. Jack gives an invitation to have dinner with the United Nations Secretary General to Grant, who is more interested in attending. When he sees Ann at the firm, he confronts Sally and the rest of the executive committee over it. He also confronts her over her unwillingness to protest his suspension. At Algonquin, Jack lays off 160 staff members in one day. When the COO of the airline cannot renegotiate a deal with a supplier, Jack steps in and gets better terms. When the COO refuses to authorize the sale of the shipping facility to another airline, Jack fires him. Later, when Ian shows Jack that the luggage tracking system developed by the COO that he fired is more advanced than others in the industry, Jack initially responds by increasing the asking price of the baggage handling system. Jack explains the baggage handling system to Sally and she also thinks that he should make it part of the sell-off but he has changed his mind. He suggests they purchase the rights and develop the technology themselves. When she refuses, he meets with the COO he fired to offer him a chance to buy the technology and license it out himself. At the end of the episode, Jack tries to convince Sally that he can turn the airline around instead of dismantling it and she offers him the chance to turn the airline around in 2 years. Benny has an undisclosed medical condition. At the bar later, Marty tricks Benny into admitting he has a health problem and Ann's attempt at reconciliation is rebuffed by everyone but Chris. When he finds out that Benny's health problem is hemorrhoids the following day, Marty ridicules him about it. When Ann enters the trading floor to offer helpful information to Marty, he makes it clear that she is not to enter the trading pit and he does not want to communicate with her at all. Cathy finds a stock recommendation that Ann has personally left behind and the floor acts on it. Ann later admits intentionally planting a stock recommendation knowing that Cathy would act on and profit from it.
30	4	"Turnaround Is Fair Play"	Alan Goluboff	Michael Teversham	1997
The show begins with Adam hosting a horse breeding event. During the event, someone opens a bottle of champagne and the popping sound of the bottle being opened scares the horses causes the mare to kick the stud in the genitals, rendering him sterile and afraid of mares. As a last-ditch effort to recoup his $12 million loss on the stud, Adam considers Grant's suggestion that they clone the stud and the two of them meet with a scientist to discuss it. Later, during a meeting with other investors, Adam buys one of the investors out. The scientist is having trouble cloning the $12M horse but assures Adam that, with repeated trials, a clone will be made. Later on, when the investor that rejected the cloning idea offers him $12M for the horse to prevent the cloning, Adam sells. Grant gets angry because he realizes that Adam only used cloning as a negotiating ploy to recover his investment back. Adam and Sally meet with Jack to tell him that they need the airline to be profitable in 16 months and not the original 24. Having difficulty with the remaining employees, Jack and Ian move to establish an employee stock ownership program but, not trusting Jack, the employees reject it. Not knowing of their history, Ian brings Ann in to help find a more palatable stock ownership alternative and the airline employees accept Ann's stock ownership proposal. Jack is approached by a mercenary named Jean-Paul Brunet who had planned to buy Algonquin's airplanes during the expected break-up. An Algonquin plane later crashes thereby jeopardizing the survival of the airline. Still trying to save it, Jack and Ian try to prepare the airline for the safety board but a maintenance log is missing. They suspect that the head mechanic who called in sick took the log book and visit his home since it is only the second time he has called in sick in 40 years. When Jack asks him if he's covering up for another employee, he assures Jack that the flight was checked out but admits that it was never signed over. His not signing it over was a protest but he assures Jack that the plane was airworthy. Jack asks him to sign the maintenance log and put it back but, knowing that would be fraudulent, the mechanic refuses. While they are talking, the transport authority suspends all flights pending mechanical inspection of Algonquin's fleet. Back at the airline, Jack meets with the press, expresses confidence in the airline staff, assures them that the crash is not due to mechanical failure and takes full responsibility for the crash if it is. Back at Gardner, Sally tells Adam that she intends to support him if the investigation does not find the airline at fault for the crash. Jack again meets with Jean-Paul and agrees to sell three planes for $16 million with payment made before delivery. Investigators from the transportation safety board attribute the crash to a freak wind shear thereby absolving the airline of all responsibility and the suspension is lifted.
31	5	"Pledge of Allegiance"	Stacey Stewart Curtis	Maureen McKeon	1997
Ann asks Marty for permission to borrow Grant for a credit union client of hers to trade derivatives for a few days. Grant gets angry at Marty for saying that he would wipe out the credit union but Marty allows him to trade for the credit union if he does twice as much volume for Marty. At 30 minutes before market close, Grant's trading on behalf of the credit union is up $300,000 so Ann tells him to stop. Despite her initial objections, he runs a new market algorithm that immediately brings profits up to $500,000. Soon after she leaves his office, he makes a change and the profit quickly turns into a loss. Smitten by Ann, he covers his loss by embezzling from one of the other trading accounts. When he tells Benny, Benny tells Ann what happened. She is initially reluctant to help Grant. Marty later confronts Grant about the embezzlement he has discovered and warns him not to do it again. Benny is such a mess after Cathy's leaving that Marty asks him not to deal with any clients. Sally meets with an ice skate manufacturer client of Jack's who is trying to raise capital to expand his product line into roller hockey. Annoyed by his behavior, Sally tells him that his company is not attractive enough for Gardner to finance. She suggests that he sell his company to an American sports manufacturer looking to get into hockey gear but he nationalistically he refuses to hear of it. After the meeting, feeling undermined by Ian's chumminess with the client, she takes him off the account. Since Sally has never played hockey, Ian tries to explain the skate manufacturer's personality to her even though she removed him from the account. He also asks her to ask the client to autograph his hockey card from his professional days. When Sally meets with the skate manufacturer at an ice rink, he says he doesn't want to sell out to the Americans but when she proposes that he take inline skate production offshore to lower costs and keep ice skate production in Canada, he becomes more receptive. Later on, at the firm, he insists on good working and living conditions for his workers if he will manufacture inline skates in a Third World country. During the meeting, they learn that his company's trading volumes have risen. He initially suspects that Sally has approached an American firm until she explains that it's probably an American competitor that has become more interested in his firm as a result of its increased sponsorship. After Ian defends her, she invites him back on the deal. Sally later confirms the American sports manufacturer's intent to take over her client's firm by hostile takeover if necessary. Marty refuses to act on the takeover attempt without consulting Adam so Sally comes up with an unorthodox plan to defend the skate manufacturer. As a bluff, she decides to begin outsourced manufacturing talks with Cuba and leak that information to the press. Under the Helms-Burton Act, American companies cannot do business in Cuba so it will force them to back away from a takeover. When they hesitate, the company can then set up manufacturing in Taiwan and Malaysia instead. When the skate manufacturer meets with a Cuban representative, the bluff turns into a potential deal. An old shoe factory can meet all present and future needs of the skate manufacturer, the factory is safe from Helms Burton litigation and it meets working and living conditions for employees he requires. Adam is against the skate manufacturer setting up operations in Cuba and confronts Sally. If Sally's deal goes through, his deal to finance a bridge in America will not. After Adam tells her that he has also arranged financing from an American bank to the tune of $100M per year, she decides to tell her client that the deal is off but then changes her mind after Donald tells her that the American bank has not committed to the deal as Adam claimed. When the news hits the press, it destroys all prospects of a deal with the American bank. To avoid putting the ice skate manufacturer at further risk of takeover, Jack and Sally propose a private placement to hockey fans. When Jack receives word from the investment dealers association wanting to reinstate him as a banker on the condition that he make a public apology to Victor Kennilworth and Cancorp. and also go for anger management counseling, Jack is disinterested replying and tells the lawyer that he wants to stay with the airline. Jack soon leaves to meet the buyer of Algonquin's aircraft in a war torn country to receive payment for the 3 planes he sold. At the airport in the Third World country, Jack meets Joe Fitzpatrick, a man who owns a claim in what could become a diamond mine in the future. Jack soon learns that Joe has been successful in prospecting in the past. During a poker game, the man loses a 20% share of his claim to Jack. Their game is interrupted by the mercenary who arrives with $13M of the money. After Jack receives payment, he pays the mine owner $200,000 for 51% of the mine. After he returns, Sally is dismayed at Jack having purchased 51% of the diamond mine claim on behalf of Gardner Ross using an old checkbook even though he has no signing authority. When Sally visits the airline later, she learns of the reinstatement letter from the investment dealers association. Jack explains that he will not make the required apology. Wanting him to return to the firm, she offers to apologize on his behalf, find a psychiatrist who says he won't need anger management, hire a management company to replace him and either give him $1M or provide for full backing on the diamond claim. Due to a NAFTA crisis, the American ambassador is unable to attend the function that Adam, Donald and Ian's mother have all traveled to attend. Ian asks Sally out but, thinking that he is only doing it to spy on her for Adam, she refuses. When Adam learns that Ian asked Sally out for a drink, sensing a change in loyalty, he suggests sending Ian to the airline to replace Jack. Sally takes him up on his drink offer.
32	6	"A Soldier's Virtue"	Reid Dunlop	Hart Hanson	1997
Ziggy starts on the trading floor. She offers Marty a trading idea but he ignores it. While on a finance show, a microphone falls into Sally's blouse causing a comical situation. A multi-billionaire named Phil Hoagland who has seen the show is smitten and shows up at the firm with flowers for Sally. Later, she refuses to see Phil when he unexpectedly shows up at the firm because she is with a client. Before he leaves, Adam tells him about a charity event Sally has planned for the afternoon. Phil shows up at croquet to meet Sally. A chemical company pulls out of a deal Jack is working on as a result of his assault charge. The owner of the company for sale, who is homosexual, suspects that to be the reason for the pullout. At croquet, Donald meets an employee from the company that Sally trashed on TV. When Donald asks him if Sally was wrong about the company, he replies that she was and gives him the world's smallest voice-activated recorder which is made by the company. During the game, a mallet slips from Donald's hand, flies through the air and hits Victor on the head, knocking him out. Feeling responsible, Donald stays with him at the hospital until he regains consciousness. When Donald expresses concern that his retina might have been detached again, the investment banker replies that it was never detached to begin with. He lied to set Jack up. In his stupor, he also divulges that his bank holds the chemical company's line of credit and his bank threatened to revoke it if Gardner Ross was chosen to lead the deal. Not yet knowing this, Jack tells his client that the reason the acquiring firm is pulling out is because of the assault charge and not the client's sexual orientation. In response, the client turns down Jack's offer to let him go with another banker. The morning after a sleepless night at the hospital Donald is about to tell Jack what the competing banker told him when Jack rudely interrupts him to demand more prospective suitors to buy his client's company. Sally returns to her office to find it filled with balloons from Phil. When Jack pops one of them, they discover that they are all filled with cubic zirconias. On the phone later, Phil tells Sally that one of the cubic zirconias is a real diamond. When Donald shows Adam the voice-activated recorder, Adam takes it. Later, in his office, Adam listens to everything recorded for the day. Unknown to anyone, he discovers Victor's admissions. At lunch with David Astin, Adam offers to replace Jack if the chairman allows the chemical company to do the merger with Jack's client. When the chairman refuses, Adam realizes that the big bank wants Jack and hands David a transcript of the recorded conversation. Not telling Jack about the taped conversation, Adam offers to take the lead on the deal and Jack accepts. When he announces the change the following morning, Donald tells him that he was set up by the other bank. Jack arranges a meeting between his client and Sally's fast food client. After an executive committee meeting, all members vote against Adam, allowing Jack to retain lead the deal. At a bar, Jack sees the investment banker who previously got him thrown into jail. Victor has lost his job and asks Jack if there are any opportunities available at Gardner Ross. Jack ignores him. The financial show host announces a challenge to Sally to use the voice stress analyzer on the air to support her previous claims about its manufacturer. When Sally reappears on the finance show opposite Phil Hoagland, they ask each other questions to test a voice stress analyzer made by the company that Sally previously trashed on the show that is now owned by Phil. Sally gets Phil to admit that her negative recommendation on his company was solid. At the end, they agree to dinner together. For her recommendation on the technology company Phil owns, Marty decides to give Ziggy a chance to become a trader.
33	7	"Profit and Prejudice"	Henry Sarwer-Foner	Maureen McKeon	1998
Pauline and Adam are enjoying a private moment at his home when Ann interrupts them to show Adam an offer she has received to head up a mutual fund from a rival investment bank. The following day, Adam proposes the mutual fund idea at the executive committee meeting but, feeling that the existence of his trading floor will be threatened, Marty opposes the idea. Realizing that the fund manager will want to be on the executive committee, Sally decides that the manager candidate's election must be agreed on unanimously by the current committee. Adam begins establishing the mutual fund. He then announces to the trading floor that the inception of the fund does not mean there will be firings from the trading floor but Marty is not convinced. When Adam asks him how he can ease Marty's mind over the mutual fund inception, Marty asks for half of the fund's capital. Adam promises him a third. Marty soon figures out that Adam has Ann in mind for the manager position so, after hours, Marty convinces Donald to apply for fund manager. The civil war in the country where Jack landed a diamond claim has ended and Jack is eager to proceed with the mine development but Sally wants to hold off until the country stabilizes. She later relents and commits $500,000 to diamond mine development. Donald and Jack decide to use the money to buy a shell company on the Vancouver Stock Exchange, issue a prospectus on the diamond mine and make a stock offering to raise the $1 million they need to proceed with the second drilling but Sally doesn't want to be associated with the VSE. They propose that Sally, Jack and Joe Fitzpatrick be given signing authority but, since Gardner is putting up all of the capital, Sally does not want the prospector to have any signing authority and proposes Adam instead. The diamond mining shell company quickly drops to $0.04, down from its $0.30 issue price. Jack agrees to back Ann as mutual fund manager if she helps drive up the price of his diamond mine. Key members of the firm start to realize that Adam promised Ann a mutual fund to lure her back to the firm. Jack and the prospector meet with Jean-Paul and they form a deal getting him to underwrite the $1M second drilling expedition in return for a share of the company. The results of the second drilling expedition are stellar. In a private discussion between the two of them, Sally agrees to consider Donald as manager for the new fund. The executive committee proposes Donald as manager of the fund with Marty as co-head. Adam initially refuses to vote in favor but relents thinking that Marty will not be approved due to his trading record. When Ann finds out that Donald has been offered the fund manager position and goes straight to Sally to discuss it. She offers to contribute the 5% of the diamond stock she bought as seed money for the fund, something that Donald cannot offer. She also promises not to vote with Adam all of the time. Due to his securities commission infractions, Marty cannot have any association with the fund, torpedoing Donald's chances of becoming fund manager. They agree on Ann as manager but nobody nominates her for the executive committee. Expecting interest rates to drop in contrast to market expectations, Benny wants to buy bonds. Marty agrees to let him act on his idea even though Benny will lose his job if he is wrong. Benny's bond speculation turns out to be profitable.
34	8	"Meltdown"	John L'Ecuyer	David S. Young	1998
The episode starts with Grant having a nightmare about the world ending. He is convinced that it is a prophecy. At the executive meeting, members discuss a solar company. After the meeting, Adam calls a broker who owes him a favor and discovers that Sally has a heavy position the solar company in her blind trust. During a heated discussion, it is revealed that Sally doesn't know the blind trust is holding the solar company. In order for the solar company merger to go through, Sally has to put up her Gardner Ross shares, leaving Adam with the only voting shares. When she tells Jack that her shares will be put up if the solar stock drops below a certain price, he responds that they must keep the stock price above that level. Jack asks Ann if she knows anyone who would be willing to buy shares in Sally's solar stock. She calls a German buyer to offer him the solar stock but has to sweeten the deal with 350,000 diamond mine shares. Adam finds out from friends he has at the German bank about the deal Ann and Jack offered. After the price of the solar company hits $16, Sally is forced to put her shares of Gardner into escrow. Jack has to loan Sally $10M to get her shares back and keep Adam from controlling the firm. A movie about the world ending causes a severe market correction. At the end of the day, the firm is unable to meet its capital requirements or margin call due the following morning. The compliance officer tells Sally that, with Adam's signed authorization, Marty shorted 8 million shares of the solar stock while it was on the restricted list but compliance is unable to find any evidence of the trade. Sally asks Grant, who is a computer whiz, to help the compliance officer investigate. He finds a ghost trade in an account in the name of Adam's wife. When Ann meets with Grant later, it turns out that a program he developed was responsible for her up day. Grant innocently tells Adam that he is responsible for Ann's trading gains from the previous day. Adam gets Ann to hand over an account's details so he can hide Marty's solar short trade profits. Needing Adam's signature to sell the diamond mining stock, Jack and Sally consider violating regulations by transferring the stock without signature but Sally does not go through with it. The compliance officer offers not to report the ghost trade to the securities commission for $1M from Adam and Marty. Marty refuses but, disgusted that he used Adam's late wife's account, Adam agrees to pay. Not aware that she has bought back her voting shares, Adam orders Sally to sell her shares in the solar company. She also forces Adam to sell Jack the shares he lost a year ago at book value. If he refuses, Sally will alert the compliance officer to where the profits from the solar stock short are hidden. The episode ends at Grants 'End of the World' party. Sally returns Jack's $10M and offers him Gardner Ross shares.
35	9	"Hope Chasers"	Steve DiMarco	Alyson Feltes	1998
Benny formally divorces his wife, leaving him more sensitive to his faith. Back at the firm later, he disobeys Marty's order to get rid of Israeli bonds. After Ziggy shows Marty the position in Israeli bonds that Benny lied about, Marty freezes the account causing an outburst from Benny. After Benny has finished, Marty makes it clear that trading decisions should not be made based on religious conviction. After Sally helps Phil buy a cement factory from a rival family, he commissions her and Jack to help him buy properties along the St. Lawrence seaway before legislation is passed making the seaway nonprofit. Adam thinks the project is being used as a test of Gardner's capabilities by Phil. Buying the St. Lawrence seaway will use up most of Phil's capital and lead to a significant rise in operating costs. Not sure if Phil is testing them or not, Sally does not know whether Phil wants them to tell him that buying the seaway is impossible or if he wants them to find a creative way to make the buy. When she asks him what his intentions are, he responds that he wants to reclaim the seaway so he can preserve it. Sally finds a way for Phil to purchase the St. Lawrence seaway and the structures that feed into it. She presents an ambitious long-term plan to buy all of the shipping and holding facilities in the Great Lakes but Adam is concerned that the deal would consume Gardner's resources for a long time into the future. Phil likes the plan and wants Sally and Gardner Ross to execute it but she refuses the offer responding that she does not want to spend her life pursuing someone else's dream. Jack finds Ann shooting heroin in her bathroom and angrily leaves. Later, after receiving a phone call from her, Jack finds Ann passed out on her bathroom floor after a heroin overdose.
36	10	"The Afterlife"	Gord Langevin	Ann MacNaughton	1998
The episode begins with Ann in the hospital emergency room. While jogging, Sally is approached by a young MBA student named Trisha Kennedy who wants to work as an intern but Sally turns her down. When Sally arrives at the firm, she finds a large client in the reception area waiting on Ann. Later, due to Trisha's persistence, Sally takes her on as an intern. Adam engages a Canadian 20 funeral parlor undertaker who wants to start a discount funeral chain but Adam doesn't want Gardner to be associated with any kind of discount operation. Adam promises to raise $30M in a private placement for the Canadian undertaker but, hoping to gain some free advertising, the undertaker prefers a public offering. Adam is approached by another funeral home operator who has seen an infomercial for his client's modest interment business. He first offers to buy out the entire modest interment business but, knowing his client would be unlikely to sell, Adam suggests that he make an offer for the Southern Ontario operations instead. He offers 25% more than the price Adam suggests. At their next meeting, Adam offers to buy out his client's Southern Ontario operations for $10M but he refuses. In a meeting with Adam's undertaker client and a competing undertaker, the competitor offers $15M for his southern Ontario funeral homes on the condition that he not promote his modest interment business in any of the competitor's areas. The profit that Adam's client will make from his southern Ontario holdings will allow him to market his modest interment in other markets. Adam suggests that undertakers throughout the country who might be threatened by discount funerals might also be willing to buy out his operation making him a huge profit. After learning of Ann's condition and whereabouts, Adam, Sally and Jack decide that Donald would be the best person to act as fund manager in her absence. Marty meets with Donald to convince him to take the fund management opportunity. The traders start taking bets on the reason for Ann's absence. After Ann's large fund client meets with Donald and Marty, he decides to pull out. Later, the securities commission receives a complaint about Marty's involvement with the fund since he is not registered. To Marty's dismay, as fund manager, Donald sells off the fund's gold stock to invest in oil and gas. In an executive committee meeting later, Donald justifies his decision by pointing out that a mutual fund is not well equipped to do short-term trading like the trading floor. After faxing the fund holdings to the large investor who earlier pulled out, the investor reverses his earlier decision and decides not to withdraw from the fund. Donald then negotiates terms as a fund manager with Sally.
37	11	"Independence Days"	Stephen Williams (director)	Michael Teversham	1998
Trisha is in the reception area when a man enters wanting to see Jack. When she tells him that Jack is in a meeting, he forces her to take him to the meeting at gunpoint. Jack deftly confronts him taking away what is actually a water gun. It turns out that he is an old friend of Jack's named Sonny who wants Jack to raise capital to finance a television venture. Adam and Sally are not interested in Sonny's company because it would cause a conflict of interest with a preexisting client. Adam was also previously involved with Sonny on a deal that went bad. Encountering resistance from the others, Jack personally gives Sonny money to move forward. Even though Donald manages a resource fund, Jack suggests he buy into Sonny's media technology company. Later on, not remembering having dealt with him before, Sonny walks into Adam's office to ask why Adam refuses to deal with him. They straighten things out after a discussion. Sally tells Donald not to buy into Sonny's deal. When she discusses Jack's insistence on proceeding with the deal despite the executive committee decision not to, he decides to go on vacation. At home, Jack and Sonny try to find other ways to float the deal without Gardner Ross. Sonny suggests they try Cancorp. Knowing his is barred from their offices, Jack bribes his way past security at a private club to speak with David Astin. David won't consider the deal but suggests that Jack leave Gardner. When the chairman meets with Adam later, he learns that Cancorp. is likely to take the deal. In a discussion with Sally later, Adam suggests they fire Jack. While at his apartment, David appears with proof that Sonny is willing to dissolve his partnership with Jack and work with Cancorp. instead. He offers Jack a position as VP of corporate finance with the discretion to do deals up to $500M. Later on, Jack confronts Sonny over Sonny's attempt to cut him out of the deal. He points out that he refused the chairman's offer to cut Sonny out of the deal and that the chairman was only using Sonny to get Jack to relocate to Cancorp. In response, Sonny offers to let Jack buy him out but that is unworkable. They agree that the deal includes the two of them or it does not happen. Donald later declines to finance Jack and Sonny's deal from the mutual fund. During an executive meeting, Adam moves to dismiss Jack but Sally suggests they set up an independent merchant bank under Jack's leadership seeded with his capital so that Jack has more freedom to pursue deals. This arrangement will give Gardner a first look at any deal. Jack agrees to do the deal with Sonny if Sonny holds back on his plans to expand into China and put his island up as collateral. After Marty tries to discover Ann's whereabouts from Grant, Jack gives Grant a whistle to blow anytime Marty tries to extract information about why Ann is not at work. When Marty goes to Grant's office to find out what happened to Ann, Grant blows on the whistle that Jack gave him before telling Marty that Ann's dead. After Marty orders Chris to make a trade against his will, the computers go down. On her first day, Trisha sends the wrong prospectus to a client. Sally tasks her with writing a proposal. While working on the proposal, Trisha gets a little helpful advice from Adam. Sally and Phil break up while a TV camera is recording them from a distance. It later airs on a tabloid show. At the end, Phil suggests that, since the world now thinks he's single, they continue their relationship in private.
38	12	"The Unseen Lever"	Jeremy Podeswa	Hart Hanson	1998
Marty's wife gets him a motor home for their anniversary. Twenty years before, he promised to quit his job on their 20th anniversary and travel to south America by motor home with her. To at least appear to placate her wishes, he takes a few days away from the firm to pretend to plan the trip with her. Sally refuses to allow Marty time off but he leaves anyway explaining that he needs the time to deal with a marital situation. Benny explains to the staff how when Marty was his underling, he promised her the Latin America trip after she caught him working on their honeymoon. Ian presents his successes with the airline to Adam and Sally and then announces that he wants to return to Gardner. Sally assigns him to Jack to help him with a beer company deal. Ian and Jack meet with Trudy Kelly to discuss a beer she has been marketing. Because a fungus-infected batch of the beer had previously been shipped, they suggest she change the brand name. While testing out Trudy Kelly's beer, Sally, Ian and Jack decide the beer should be targeted to women. After Sally's insistence, Jack tasks Ian with running the idea to market the beer to women by Trudy Kelly. When Ian pitches her, he angrily rejects the idea. They learn that she bought the brewery to shake off the perception that her products only appeal to women. That is the reason why she did not ask Sally to handle the deal. Sally later convinces Trudy to change the name of the beer and market it to women. In a sauna conversation, David Astin promises to let Gardner handle a large bank merger if Adam can persuade the Minister of Finance to allow it. At lunch later, Ian's mother suggests that if Adam successfully handles the large bank merger, it may clinch the U.N. appointment he wants and offers to help him. After she consults with the minister, she tells him that the minister will not allow a bank merger in the near future. In response, Adam decides to turn the bank's acquisition target to an insurance company instead. David is not interested in an insurance company merger until Trisha points out that their compatible computer systems would make the combination synergistic. Donald shows up at Marty's house to try to convince Marty to delay his departure. In his absence, Marty suggests Donald do something that will raise eyebrows as a career move so Donald tries to land an uncouth but very wealthy client named Noah. Noah suggests they meet for drinks later that evening and asks him to bring girls. If they get along well, Noah will invest $50M in Donald's mutual fund. After consulting with Jack, Donald realizes that Noah expects him to bring hookers. Ian suggests that he get two for Noah. With Grant's help, Donald finds and books escorts on the Internet. At the bar, Trisha hints that although Adam will not be doing a bank merger, he will do another large merger. Chris and Benny quickly figure out that he plans to merge the bank with an insurance company that he is on the board of directors. The following day, David shows up at Gardner angrily wanting to know why the securities commission has asked him to confirm that he has engaged Gardner on the life insurance company purchase. Meanwhile, the trading floor has begun buying the insurance company on the information they surmised from Trisha. When she admits to Adam that she was the leak, he tells her that she wasn't. He has the compliance officer put a different financial firm on the restricted list and warns her to be more discreet. Their decoy works but Adam learns that the chairman has been chosen Canadian ambassador to the United Nations since using a Canadian bank to handle the merger is seen as patriotic. Adam initially says he will not do the merger. He also learns that Ian's mother betrayed him. Marty warns Donald not to take Ziggy to a mutual fund industry event or else he will lose his position as fund manager. He then announces his intention to quit to Sally and Adam. Donald later tells Ziggy that he will not be attending the mutual fund event. Sally later goes to Marty's house to offer incentives for him to stay on. He rejects her offer but his wife agrees to let him continue to work if he gets his own bathroom. At the end of the episode, when Trisha finds Adam drunk and despondent in his office after hours, she successfully makes intimate advances toward him.
39	13	"The Sun and the Moon"	Alex Chapple	Ann MacNaughton	1998
Jean-Paul Brunet shows interest in participating as an investor in an airport deal in a former Soviet state. Oil companies investing heavily in the area are expected to require an airport. On Adam's advice, Jack approaches a wealthy Russian investor born in the former Soviet state to invest in the airport and receives a $10M commitment on the condition that no bribes are paid to government officials to get the airport built. To Adam's surprise, the Russian investor's involvement with the airport results in threats of sabotage from nationalists of the former Soviet state. When the investor learns of this, he responds that it is really the government of the former Soviet state that does not want him involved because they know he will not pay bribes to get the airport built but promises to withdraw from the project if Jack insists on it. Before leaving, he tells them that they will be asked to pay protection money to build the airport. Soon after, they are asked to do so. Adam and Sally decide to withdraw from the airport deal rather than be blackmailed. Jack asks Jean-Paul to protect the airport but he refuses to consider it since creating the need for his services by investing in a politically sensitive area would be seen as self-dealing. He also helps Jack rule out hiring a private security force for the airport since it would make the investment unprofitable. When Jack and Adam meet to discuss the status of the airport deal, Adam convinces Jack to pay the bribe but not tell the Russian investor that he is doing so. They later meet with him and lie about the government not extracting bribes from them. He leaves overjoyed thinking the government of the former Soviet state did not ask for bribes. Sally is approached by a fashion distribution company in need of expansion capital. During a visit with the fashion designer, Sally discovers a rift between the designer and the distributor. During a meeting with the fashion designer and the distributor, Sally angrily denies them financing after the two get into a heated argument. At a later meeting, the designer asks Sally to help him get his company back and ahe agrees to lend him enough money to buy back his brand from a company that had previously acquired his. Sally returns to her office after hours to find Phil inside. An argument between them turns physical leaving Sally with a black eye. When she later meets him at a house he bought for her, she learns that he is manic depressive but has been off medication for months. He asks her to confirm with his doctor. After Phil's constant urging, Sally finally talks to his doctor to learn that he is not violent but that the doctor has also refused to take him back as a patient unless he starts taking his prescribed medication again. Realizing Phil has no intention of taking the medicine, Sally breaks up with him. Sally recognizes Trisha's crush on Adam and warns him of the possible repercussions if he mishandles the situation.
40	14	"Two Steps Forward"	Peter Wellington (director)	Maureen McKeon	1998
Adam and Trisha's affair is in full swing but, feeling uncomfortable with it, he asks Sally to keep Trisha away from his office more and she does. Adam ends his relationship with Trisha leading her to resign emotionally. Ann is released from rehab. Adam and Sally still think it was a suicide attempt until she meets with them at the firm later to confess that she was a heroin addict. When they discuss the matter with the compliance officer, they learn that drug abuse is considered a disability so if they fire her, she can sue them. They are not required to give her the mutual fund manager position though. In a meeting to discuss Ann's future with the firm, they decide that she cannot head up the mutual fund. Jack asks Marty to consider Ann for the trading floor as a favor to him. Ann accepts Marty's offer to maker her a commodities trader. Donald has an asthma attack when he learns that he has become permanent fund manager. Senior members of the firm meet to determine annual bonuses. Corporate finance has had good year but the trading floor's bonus pool is smaller than the year before. When Ziggy later finds Chris and Benny in Sally's office looking for bonus information, she offers Sally's password if the two of them promise to get Marty to reexamine her for the commodities test. Angry about the decrease in their bonuses for the year, the trading floor later stops working forcing Marty to ask Sally and Adam to raise their bonuses. They promise to match whatever portion of his bonus he is willing to give up for his traders. Adam's political connection is likely to be promoted to Deputy Prime Minister. He asks Adam if his blind trust can be made to disappear. Adam agrees to help him in return for a different political appointment. The blind trust can be dismantled but there are several companies that profited enormously from decisions made by the politician and his cronies, thereby running afoul of Cabinet conflict of interest guidelines. To avoid being implicated in any wrongdoing that comes to light, Adam backdates the trust's inception date and changes the name of the person who started the fund from his to his deceased partner Cedric. In return, the politician hands Adam an order in counsel of appointment to a court. After a newspaper article exposes his underhanded dealings, the politician resigns from his post while Adam gets credit for providing the information that led to the politician's downfall. A friend of Sally's who has become a single mother via in vitro fertilization shows up at the firm looking for help with a diaper deal but due to her past record of quickly selling companies that she either founds or leads, Sally has reservations about her long-term commitment. She later decides not to hire her friend. Sally's old friend and former lover moves onto another idea so is no longer interested in a job at a Gardner Ross company. At the bar, in Ian's presence, her friend reveals that the two of them had an affair in college. He thinks it's hot.
41	15	"Retreat, But No Surrender"	Gord Langevin	David Barlow	1998
A minister of industry arrives at the firm to hear financing ideas for a new project but, uncomfortable with the less than professional work atmosphere, leaves without meeting with anyone. An event organizer tries to sell Sally on a weekend retreat for the firm's staff. The rest of the executive committee reject the idea until Sally tells Adam that the event organizer is close to the minister whose business they just lost. Adam agrees to go along as long as she agrees to redefine the managing partnership to give him more control if they cannot win back the minister. The rest of the firm is unwilling so Sally makes the retreat mandatory. To win Jack over, Sally offers to allow him to pitch his equity idea to the minister if they get him back as a client. Benny falls asleep during the first seminar. The event organizer tasks Adam and Sally with making dinner for everyone. Adam cooks a great meal but, as they were not told that food is limited, they will have to ration food for the rest of the weekend. They sleep in bunk beds but when the men discover they are short a bed, Chris offers to sleep outside if Benny gives him $200. While outside, Chris encounters Ziggy who is trying to find her way to Donald's room. She offers Chris $1,000 to get Donald out to the tent so they can spend the night together. Chris tells him she offered him $5,000 and Donald quickly agrees to pay. The next exercise is for the firm members to decide roles. They can either be sovereigns, knights or squires. They choose teams and spend the day playing team-building games together. After the day is over, firm members share candid insights with each other. On the second day, they play a war game that reveals everyone's character. At the end of it all, they argue over who won. When the squires from Adam's team say they would have preferred to be on Sally's team, the point of the exercise is revealed. Squires choose their knights who, in turn, choose their sovereigns. Within earshot of the consultant, Marty suggest that they buy shares in his company. When he then shows his appreciation for all that he learned over the weekend by offering a favor to the consultant. The consultant decides to open an account with him. Ian decides that he would prefer to work for Sally rather than Jack. Donald decides to give up the mutual fund. The minister returns to hear the firm's financing ideas.
42	16	"Joint Adventures"	David Straiton	Michael Teversham	1998
While Sally confronts Adam in the reception area over a deal of hers that he tried to poach, she starts to vomit. When the client later shows up at the firm, she learns that Adam had arranged for a meeting with him. Marty shows up to work with his son Randy, who has been suspended from school for taking the bake sale money and using it to trade. They suspended him for taking a commission on the trade. Thinking that the boredom of Marty's job would inspire Randy to do better in school, his wife forces Marty to take him to work. Instead, he takes an avid interest in the markets. On the second day, Marty starts teaching Randy how to trade. Randy's trades are profitable. Marty realizes his encouragement has gone too far when Randy decides to drop out of school to become a trader. Marty learns from the compliance officer that Randy took credit for Grant's trades. After an argument, Randy decides to try to get a job at another firm but Marty calls all of the other firms to ask them not to hire him. Donald is eager to buy into Gardner Ross Larkin venture capital. Jack and Donald try to find a way to get arena for a basketball team owner. After a meeting between their basketball team owner client and the owner of an indoor soccer team that owns land with the right zoning for an arena, their client refuses the deal because the soccer team owner is Italian. Jack then proposes they tie the deal in with a casino but their client doesn't like that idea either. When Donald comes up with a plan for a facility that can host sports and concerts, Jack has to reject it because entertainment facilities require special hearings and the facility needs to be built quickly. Donald finally confronts Jack with the fact that doing the deal with the soccer team owner is the only viable option and Jack agrees to try to convince their client. When Jack and Donald meet with the basketball team owner, they learn that she had bad dealings with Italians on two separate occasions in the past and fires them after Donald's persistence. Later, Jack accepts Donald as a partner even though Donald blew the deal. An examination finds an anomalous cyst on one of Sally's ovaries which will require immediate surgical removal. She warns Adam to stay away from her deal while she is in the hospital. Ian sees Adam in a meeting with the top purchasing officer for the Canadian Armed Forces. When Ian meets with Sally's client, he is unable to convince him that their deal is better than Adam's. Ian agrees. During conversation, Sally tells Ian that she might have cancer. Adam visits Sally in the hospital and admits that his government sources helped him present a better proposal to the client. He thinks that a combination of both deals is best for the client but refuses to lead the deal. The episode ends with a doctor telling Sally that the malignant tumor was fully removed but further tests must be done.
43	17	"End Games"	John L'Ecuyer	Graham Clegg, Maureen McKeon	1998
During an executive meeting, Sally announces the firm's participation in a hot aerospace issue and Adam announces that the Financial Post will name him businessman of the year. When Adam meets Trisha for lunch and learns that she is job hunting, he encourages her to apply for a market analyst position with Grant. Later, while waiting in his office, she discovers a new artifact on his shelf and realizes she is still seeing Ian's mother. She gets angry and storms out but returns later with her lawyer to file a sexual harassment suit. He decides to fight her in court even after Sally reminds him that he will lose his businessman of the year award if he does not settle privately. While preparing Adam for the deposition, the compliance officer learns that Grant might be able to help Adam's case. When asked, Grant confirms that Trisha seemed jealous. Briefly questioning Grant reveals that, despite his best intentions, he would be detrimental to Adam's case on a witness stand thereby forcing Adam to settle the lawsuit out of court for $2 million. Ian suggests to Donald that they branch out on their own with a merchant bank. They get Chris, who wants to run the floor, on board. Rising aluminum prices begin to hurt the aerospace company's prospects. Sally tasks a disinterested Marty to find out why. When Phil Hoagland's name appears on the list of suspects, she meets with him later and learns that he has no interest in aluminum. He only caused the market disruption to get her attention. In order to protect their aerospace client, the trading floor spends $40M and works overnight to stop the rise in aluminum prices. In response, Phil pulls out of the aluminum market but the following morning, the aerospace company begins having trouble buying the required lithium. Donald's initial research turns up no evidence that Phil is behind the shortage. Still unconvinced that Phil is not behind the lithium shortage, Adam suggests Sally leave the firm. When Sally and Adam tell the leader of the aerospace company of their suspicions of sabotage, he immediately suspects one of his rivals. When Adam meets with him to negotiate, Phil offers him one hundred times book value for his share of Gardner Ross but Adam declines. In order to figure out who is trying to sabotage the aerospace company, Donald approaches Grant to hack into the computer systems of the companies they are investigating but to his surprise, Grant has already done so. He then helps them show that Phil Hoagland's company is buying lithium through shell companies. Unfortunately, they do not have enough evidence to file a complaint with the competition bureau so Sally decides to leave to save Gardner Ross. Further research reveals that the lithium company has a major debt in one of its divisions. Gardner decides to buy the debt and foreclose. If Phil tries to buy the debt back, they will be able to nail him with market manipulation. If he doesn't, Gardner will own a lithium supplier. The firm sets Chris up to entrap Phil by posing as a wealthy orthodontist who has bought the debt of Phil's lithium company and record Phil trying to buy back the debt from him thereby giving Gardner enough evidence to pursue an antitrust suit against Phil. At the end, Sally meets with Phil at Gardner to tell him his actions were crazy and that they scared her.
44	18	"A Friend in Need"	Reid Dunlop	Ann MacNaughton	1998
Chris gets an unexpected visit from an attractive young woman from his hometown named Rachel but rudely blows her off but they meet later and the young woman from his hometown explains to Chris that she is in Toronto studying to be a teacher. The religious commune they both come from is paying for her tuition on the condition that she return there to teach for 5 years. Exposure to theories of evolution has made her doubt the religious teachings prevalent in the commune and she doesn't want to return home to teach things she no longer believes in. If she does not return to teach, she will be shunned by the commune so has found Chris to seek advice since he was shunned for having sex with a married woman from the same commune years before. Chris later gives Rachel money to help with her education and allow her the option of not going back to her hometown but advises her to go back anyway. When she hints at a possible relationship between the two of them, he rebuffs her. Jack, Joe Fitzpatrick and Jean-Paul Brunet get impatient with Graykirk Mining's stalling via its insistence on doing several assays before committing to development. Donald gets Gerald Graykirk to begin mine development if the results of the next assay are positive. Soon after, the price of the junior mining stock is drops. The prospector calls Jack to suggest that the large mining company investor is spreading rumors about the venture so he can buy more stock cheaply. Sally has inherited $5M from an aunt who never married or had children and begins thinking about ways to give back. Looking for a way to get more involved in charity, Sally meets with an abrasive friend of Ian's named George. Sally cuts a check for $250,000 to pay for breakfast and lunch for needy children on the condition that she be actively involved in serving them. When Marty sees the head of the mining company at Gardner, he realizes something must be wrong and sells off as much of the junior mining concern as he can as quickly as possible. In a meeting with Jack, Donald and the compliance officer, it is revealed that the assay came up dry. Knowing that the poor results will drag other unrelated mining stocks with African interests down with it, Marty spends the rest of the day shorting other junior mining stocks. Gardner Ross lost several million on the junior mining stock. During a meeting later, Marty divulges that the prospector sold 1.5 million shares. Jack receives a call from the prospector who is on site. He is drunk but accuses the large mining company of switching the samples. Jean-Paul offers to send some of his people to the prospective mine site to check for evidence of tampering but they soon learn that the prospector's airplane has gone missing after he had an argument with the big mining company's crew chief. The mercenary contributes resources to the search. In talking with Jack, Gerald reveals that someone has been stealing from his company's deposits. When the crew chief asked if anyone had offered him diamonds, the drunk prospector wanted to fight. Donald learns that Jean-Paul has been buying the mining stock ever since it crashed. Joe's airplane is later found but not his body. Jean-Paul gives Jack sworn statements from two workers who claim to have seen the prospector salt the samples. Jack suggests that the mercenary could have bribed the workers to make false statements and arranged for the prospector's disappearance. While Jack is absent from the executive committee meeting, Adam moves to sever Gardner's ties with the merchant bank arm that Jack runs and remove him from the executive committee but nobody supports him. At the end, Jack receives a letter from the prospector saying: "You'll be the first one I call if I find anything."
45	19	"The Whites of their Eyes"	Philip Earnshaw	Shelley Eriksen	1998
Looking for a stereo system for his son, Marty goes to the one man factory of an audiophile manufacturer named Stroud. Noticing that the owner has poor business skills, Marty tries to convince him to partner. After the manufacturer agrees, Marty immediately tries to sell his shares to Jack. After researching the company, Jack becomes interested in buying Marty's share out as long as Marty gets a stereo for his son. After Jack tells Marty he expects to increase Stroud's profits by 300–500%, Marty decides he wants to stay in. Marty convinces Stroud to give up 40% of his company. A competitor to Stroud that bought his previous company and forced him out is willing to pay $25 million for Stroud because they want a prestige subsidiary. They also invest in Gardner Ross Larkin as a silent partner, giving GRL an extra $50M in venture capital. When Marty finds out they have sold their share of Stroud to a company that had previously ripped off the owner, he has second thoughts. Stroud is hesitant about the deal proposal because the acquiring company put him out of business before. When he asks for Marty's advice, Marty covertly tells him to go with the original deal. After he leaves, Marty justifies his actions by saying that, even though Stroud would have made a lot of money on the deal, he would have lost his workbench. Adam lands a toll highway construction deal but due to the mining fiasco, the firm does not have the capital to underwrite the bridge loan so Adam must find a way of financing that does not require the firm's capital. He meets with David Astin who promises recommend Adam's proposal to their corporate finance department. Adam later meets with the Cancorp. banker to arrange for a bridge loan but the banker tells him that his bank will require collateral in order to extend it. Adam refuses to give him any part of the deal. Adam tries several other banks but none of them will give him a loan guarantee without a piece of the deal. The Bank Act prohibits mutual funds from making loans to banks but Adam pitches an idea to establish an independent capital pool that can legally take investments from mutual funds to a mutual fund manager that rejected his offer earlier. She likes his idea and decides to pursue it. David, having heard of Adam's independent capital pool idea, arranges a favorable bridge loan for the highway deal. Despite the potential ramifications, Adam decides to move forward with the independent capital pool. Donald invites Ziggy to attend his parents' 30th wedding anniversary. In hopes of impressing his family, she researches their forestry company. The following day, trading floor attempts to push the stock price of a timber company to the point where the company has more debt than equity. If the stock price falls below a certain level, they expect the debt holders to foreclose. Fearing that he took her advice. Ziggy is nervous because she advised Donald's father to buy the same company the night before. After the price of the forestry company starts to rise, Ann learns that Cancorp. is defending it. They hold its debt and don't want it to go under. Fearing that Donald's father is buying the forestry company like she suggested and knowing that the trading floor could lose millions if he is, she gets Donald to ask his father if D'Arby Forestry is buying the target. When they meet, Donald's father confirms that he is not buying the timber company. Ann calls the Cancorp. head trader to get him to stop defending the forestry company in exchange for some stock she has in inventory. Donald's father gives him pictures of Ziggy as a hooker given to him by a private detective from her home town. When Donald later shows Ziggy, she gets upset. Donald goes to his father to get the negatives of Ziggy as a hooker and to get them from the private detective that found them. When Donald tells Ziggy of his plans to destroy all evidence of her past, she explains that the pictures were a Halloween costume from high school. Ann defies Marty's limit to successfully down the timber company.
46	20	"Boom"	Stacey Stewart Curtis	Alyson Feltes	1998
Ann decides to go long Colombian cotton after the Colombian government announces they will provide seeds and start-up capital to cocoa growers but a landslide in Colombia soon hurts her cotton position. When Marty orders her to buy coffee futures to profit from a triad of disasters in Colombia, she has misgivings about profiting from disasters. She later arranges with the relevant authorities to pave the way for Mike's soy bean crop substitution. Tired of Ann taking up anti-drug causes on the trading floor, Marty arranges a meeting between the two of them and Adam in hopes that he can convince her to drop the causes and focus on making profitable trades. During the talk, Ann realizes that she will not find meaning in her work and decides to resign. Ann tells Jack she has signed on with the Canadian disaster relief contingent to Colombia. He responds angrily accusing her of running away from their relationship but, after she asks, he decides to hand over the merchant bank to Donald so he can go with her. The DEA announces a pilot project with Mike's genetically enhanced soybeans. Adam chairs a UN finance committee meeting in the Gardner Ross boardroom. Sally questions Adam after discovering that a numbered company he controls has transferred Old Montreal real estate leases to Gardner Ross. After Adam suggests they move the UN headquarters to Montreal, the French member of the UN finance committee supports the idea as long as France gets the credit for it. The American UN ambassador confronts Adam over his proposed plan to move the UN headquarters to Montreal and hands him a message from president's office stating that if the UN moves to Montreal the United States will not go with it. Adam's ploy works. They United States pays off its $1.5 billion UN outstanding debt obligation provided that the headquarters remain in Manhattan. Jack meets with a client who has pioneered a method of crossing soy beans with petunias with the result being soy beans more resistant to pesticides. Jean-Paul approaches Jack with a resort deal but Jack is uninterested. Jack pitches his client's super soybean to Jean-Paul as a cash crop for Colombia. Jean-Paul replies that any such move could be met with violent opposition from Colombia's drug cartel. Jack arranges a meeting between Mike, Jean-Paul and Ann. Ann is immediately interested in participating in a DEA program that might give Colombian farmers an alternative cash crop to cocaine but Jean-Paul warns that the drug cartels who control 70% of the arable land in Colombia may react violently to any crop substitution programs. Due to a $2M shortfall on the trading floor, Sally tells Adam she will need to collapse the escrow account on the bridge deal but Adam asks her not to and offers to make up the shortfall personally by putting up his Gardner Ross stock. When Sally threatens to collapse the account just to be vindictive, Adam explains why he wants to keep it open. Donald likes Jean-Paul's Ecuador deal but Jack is uninterested because he feels overextended in the Third World. Jack gives Ann an engagement ring before she gets into a limousine he has order for her. After the car travels a short distance down the street, it stops and the driver gets out and runs away from the vehicle before it blows up. Jack unsuccessfully tries to save her.
47	21	"In Toto"	Alex Chapple	Hart Hanson	1998
The episode begins with Ann's funeral. After the funeral, Jean-Paul tells Jack the police will make an arrest that day. Jack asks him to kill whoever is responsible for her death. Jean-Paul and a detective provide information to Jack about Ann's killer. Jean-Paul offers Jack a Cayman Islands-based CFO position with his private security firm. After Jack confronts the brother of the man convicted of killing Ann, he begins to think that he is the one they were trying to kill. He begins looking through all of his merchant bank deals to figure out who might want to kill him. The detective, who has the limousine company under surveillance, shows Jack pictures of him threatening the killer's brother and asks why he is threatening the killer's brother. He then gives Jack some of Ann's personal effects found in the limousine. Jack tells him he believes that it was not Ann they were trying to kill. After a brief tirade, the detective tells him to stand down. Jack then decides to take Jean-Paul's CFO offer. Chris finally shows emotion over Ann's death after Jack gives him the remains of a lighter Chris gave her. In the international media, after Jean-Paul's company gets blamed for violence in Africa, he disappears. After the detective tells Jack that Jean-Paul also had the limousine service that killed Ann on retainer, Jack begins to wonder whether it could just be a coincidence. Grant crawls into a vent and refuses to leave until Donald and Ziggy promise to find his birth mother. Ziggy and Donald find Grant's biological mother. During the meeting, Ziggy is very insensitive to Grant's birth mother who is not ready to meet the son she gave away for adoption sot hey don't tell Grant that they've found her. Chris later hires an aging hooker to pretend that she's Grant's mother so that he will start trading again. Believing that privatization can improve prisons, Adam takes on a prison privatization deal. When Ian ridicules his idea, he gets offended. Ian later apologizes to Adam for his earlier offensive behavior but Adam rejects it. Shaken by the mining company scandal and Ann's murder, the shareholder's representative meets with Sally to demand representation on the executive committee but Sally refuses. Phil warns Sally that a group of shareholders want to put a representative on the executive committee. If Sally does not agree, she will fight to put Adam in charge of Gardner Ross. As a result of their involvement with Jean-Paul, the firm is losing clients. In a meeting with Adam and Sally, Ian's mother insists that either Jack or Ann publicly take the fall for Gardner's involvement in Jean-Paul's company but Sally refuses to defame either of them. The three of them later meet with Jack to tell him they plan to shift some of the blame to Ann but he rejects that idea and asks them to blame him instead but Sally refuses. Adam, in turn, decides to announce his resignation at the next shareholder's meeting. Sally faces a hostile group of shareholders at the annual meeting. Phil supports her and Jack appears before the shareholders to take full responsibility for the firm's dealings with the private security firm. When it's Adam's turn to speak, he resigns but the shareholders rally for him to take over full control at the firm. Donald begins to consider Ian's idea to take over the Gardner Ross merchant bank.
48	22	"In Vacuo"	Alex Chapple	Hart Hanson	1998
While being interviewed on a financial television show, Marty makes remarks likely to put the firm under greater securities commission scrutiny before getting into a confrontation with the host and assaulting him. Floor activity is dead because nobody wants to trade with Gardner so Marty makes a deal with another broker to execute Gardner's trades through their floor. During an executive committee meeting, they decide that Jack should be removed from the executive committee meeting and Sally proposes they find a White knight (business). Adam and Sally meet with the David Astin to discuss a purchase of Gardner by Cancorp. Sally proposes a 3 to 1 stock swap. The chairman's successor is weak and is expected to be replaced in the coming months. Since the chairman promised to promote from within at the last annual general meeting, if he buys Gardner Ross, he can promote Adam to chairman after the merger. Adam and Sally agree to the deal with Cancorp. Jack gets Cathy and Grant to research all transactions between the merchant bank and the private security firm. He then hands Donald control over Gardner's merchant bank. In a discussion with Jack, Jean-Paul claims that the media reports about his company are untrue and says that because his company's reputation is shot, he is losing clients quickly he will need to fold the company and restart under a new name. When he offers Jack the CFO position again, Jack accepts. Cathy and Grant soon figure out that Jean-Paul has been using Gardner to launder money. They also figure out that Jack has been made director of many of Jean-Paul's shell companies, effectively framing Jack for laundering his money. Cathy and Benny decide to get married. Cathy asks him to quit trading and help her with a car servicing business she manages. Despite Sally's objections, Jack and Adam decide that Jack should take Jean-Paul's money. When Jean-Paul asks for it back, Jack will return if he collapses the bogus subsidiaries linking his money laundering to Gardner Ross. They avoid calling the police because, if they do, everything will become public record and they will lose the bank. While Jack is transferring Jean-Paul's money, he sister suggests he take it for himself. She then announces her plans to marry Benny and asks him to give her away. The Lifeshock executive decides that, due to its involvement with the mercenary firm, he doesn't want Gardner to handle his deal. In a bid to survive the turmoil, Adam suggests to Donald and Ian that he take the Lifeshock IPO to Cancorp. and set the three of them up as a separate division. Realizing that Cancorp. will uncover the money laundering during due diligence immediately, Adam and Sally meet with David to tell him the acquisition deal is off. After David storms away from the two of them, Adam privately offers him the Lifeshock IPO. In a meeting with Ian and Donald, the Lifeshock founder suggests the two of them do the deal without Gardner Ross. When Donald and Ian tell Adam they are leaving him out of the deal, he banishes them from the firm. At the end of the working day, the firm is stormed by securities commission staff who hold all Gardner Ross employees at the firm until their investigation is complete. Knowing that Jack's involvement will surface during the investigation and refusing to let him to try to shoulder the blame for the money laundering alone, Sally calls Phil for help. She then announces that Phil will buy the bank and she will take a leave of absence for health reasons, causing the securities commission to halt the investigation. Adam is furious that Sally made the decision without him. When they meet at a restaurant after he realizes Jack has taken his money, Jean-Paul admits that he used Jack to launder money. Figuring out that Jean-Paul had Ann killed to keep him from going to Colombia with her, Jack follows him outside and pummels him. After being blackballed by all of the other firms on the street, Marty's wife finds him on the floor making trades with a dead phone line. After Cathy and Benny's wedding, Jack tells her he will be leaving to live the life of Riley as she suggested.
