= Traders season 2 =

Traders
- Season 2
- No. of episodes: 13

Release
- Original network: Global Television Network
- Original release: 1996 – 1997

Season chronology
- ← Previous; Season 1 Next → Season 3

This is a list of episodes for Traders, a Canadian television drama series, which was broadcast on Global Television Network from 1996 to 2000. The show was set in a Bay Street investment bank, Gardner Ross. Bruce Gray and Sonja Smits starred as the firm's senior partners, Adam Cunningham and Sally Ross. The cast also included Patrick McKenna, David Cubitt, Rick Roberts, Chris Leavins, Gabriel Hogan, David Hewlett, Peter Stebbings and Alex Carter.

== Cast ==
=== Main ===
- Sonja Smits as Sally Ross
- David Cubitt as Jack Larkin
- Bruce Gray as Adam Cunningham
- Patrick McKenna as Marty Stephens
- Kim Huffman as Ann Krywarik
- Janet Bailey as Susannah Marks
- Rick Roberts as Donald D'Arby
- Ron Gabriel as Benny Siedleman
- David Hewlett as Grant Jansky
- Chris Leavins as Chris Todson

== Episodes ==
No. overall	No. in season	Title	Directed by	Written by	Original release date
14	1	"Chaos Theory"	Kari Skogland	Hart Hanson	1996
The season opens with Jack Larkin and Sally Ross drinking together on top of a building in an industrial park with the city skyline in the background. While they are celebrating, Sally receives a call from her father, Cedric Ross, and they both travel to meet him. During their conversation, Sally tells him she won't be going back to her professorship at the university but will be looking for a new job instead. Her father tries to explain that there are circumstances that she is unaware of and it's better that she is not involved with the firm. Just after they part, Cedric's car drives by at high speed by an unknown driver. Jack, Sally and Adam Cunningham run to find Cedric lying on the street where he has been hit by a stun gun in the heart area in what appears to be a carjacking. The three of them return to the office where Arthur Kemper, the firm's lawyer, informs them that Cedric has willed his share of the firm away to Sally. Hearing this, Adam contests the lawyer's assertion stating that, before his death, Cedric had made promises to him in the lawyer's presence. Sally immediately decides to leave the board intact and makes her, Adam and Jack into an executive committee. She then promises that if the 3 of them successfully manage the firm together for a year, she will sell each of them a corresponding share in the firm making them equal partners. Donald finds Grant Jansky, the firm's derivatives trader, immobile on the bathroom floor and calls emergency. Grant returns from the hospital in good health but it is revealed that his earlier catatonic state was caused by a toxic reaction to caffeine resulting from his incessant chocolate eating. Jack is approached by a guitar maker client who has received a phone call from the Canadian Corporate Bank of Canada, a large bank, threatening to cut off its line of credit if it goes public with Gardner Ross. Cedric's personal assistant of 37 years offers to take care of his memorial arrangements for Sally. When Sally is unsure about the randomness of her father's robbery/murder, Jack asks Tommy Rykespoor, a boxer friend of his who also does private investigation to look into Cedric's carjacking and murder. When Jack introduces Sally to Tommy, she gets upset that Jack initiated an investigation without her knowledge and consent. Before leaving, Tommy tells them that while there has been a spate of carjackings, her father's does not fit the pattern. The carjackers normally go after newer, sportier vehicles and nobody has ever been killed. During a talk in a sauna with other industry leader friends and associates, Adam dispels potentially damaging rumors about Gardner Ross. While there, he also mentions threats to the guitar maker to cut off lines of credit if the guitar maker went public with Gardner to David Astin, the chairman of Cancorp. Sally later finds a key to a safety deposit box but no record of which bank or box number it is for so she hires Tommy to find out. He quickly finds out by examining her father's car service history. When they find the box empty, knowing that the box must have been in use at the time of Cedric's death, they decide to find out who last accessed it. After discovering that Cedric's personal assistant emptied the safety deposit box, Sally and Tommy confront her. The personal assistant tells Sally that she shredded the envelope she found inside. Just after they leave, the assistant calls Adam about the envelope. Knowing that Adam has the envelope, Sally offers to sell him a third of the firm at 3 times book value. Inside of the envelope, they find an illegally obtained Canadian Security Intelligence Service (CSIS) file. Tommy's examination of the CSIS file reveals that it's the investigation of a financier who they presume is Cedric. When Jack introduces Adam to an executive from a Korean bank that purchased a large stake in Gardner Ross at the IPO, Adam does not want any involvement with them because they cannot verify the bank's sources of capital but later relents and receives a blue guitar from the guitar maker client as a token of appreciation for arranging alternative financing with the Korean bank. At the request of their Korean bank shareholder and partner, the firm sends Mike Fabris to Korea to learn Korean banking practices. The episode ends with Sally's eulogy to her father.
15	2	"The Natari Affair"	Alex Chapple	Robert Sandler & Allen Booth	1996
Jack and Donald meet with a delegation representing the Prince of Natari to discuss a $500M deal. Frustrated at not having direct contact with the Prince, Jack insults the delegation during the meeting calling them carpet hagglers only to find out that the Prince was in the delegation but never spoke. During an executive meeting later, Adam informs Jack that what the Prince did is a common tactic in the Middle East. Feeling that Jack does not have the experience to close the deal successfully, Adam asks Sally to make him the lead investment banker. Still despondent about her father's death, Sally refuses to make a decision. Acting on a tip about stock churning, a securities commission investigator arrives at the firm to investigate the trading floor. While Marty is trying to shoo him away, Sally intervenes by offering the firm's trading records for the last 72 hours by the following morning. Marty is shorting the stock of a housewares company he expects to tank because he hears that they have accounting irregularities. On the day of the securities commission investigation, Cathy finds an accounting discrepancy of $5,000. Meanwhile, the stock Marty has been shorting is not going down like he expected. In order to stall the investigator from finding the discrepancy, Sally asks Marty to alert the investigator about the housewares company he's shorting. Marty refuses admitting that he got the information from an insider so Sally stalls the investigator herself. Marty asks Sally to make a call to the securities commission investigator. When she refuses, Marty disguises his voice and makes an anonymous call to the investigator from a phone booth. Later, Marty approaches Sally about her despondence. To atone for insulting the Prince, Adam suggests that they get him a falcon as a present but feeling jilted at not getting to lead the Natari deal, he goes home early to spend time with his wife. Jack tasks Donald to find a falcon. Hoping to woo new clients, Ann asks to accompany Jack to the luncheon with the Prince. When they arrive at the meeting, they are denied admittance. Ann and Jack sneak in through a back door while Donald sets up a date with the interpreter. The Prince likes a falcon lawn ornament Jack got him and, appreciating the thoughtfulness of the gift, reconsiders doing business with Gardner Ross. Later, Jack and Anne attend a dinner with the Prince of Natari pretending to be husband and wife. Hoping to land a new client, Ann is surprised to find that men and women dine separately. They both compete with a British investment bank rival couple to connect with the Natari Prince and Princess. Meanwhile, Donald is on a date with the Arabic interpreter that unexpectedly involves booze and intimacy. The following morning, they find out that Gardner has landed the deal. Donald, mistakenly thinking that he found a deal-breaker, embarrasses Gardner by querying the Natari group about it. Jack makes him take full responsibility for his mistake. Donald's mistake embarrasses the Prince who now expects better deal terms that will bring no profit to the firm. Gardner team members figure out that the missing $5,000 is a result of an over invoicing by the Prince's interpreter. When they alert the Prince, he agrees to the original terms of the deal but realizing that the interpreter's hand might be cut off as punishment for theft when she returns to Natari and expecting the Prince to pull the plug on the deal if they try to intervene with her punishment, members of the firm are divided on what course of action to take. Concerned about how their causing someone's hand to be cut off might affect the firm's image, Jack asks the Prince to consider an alternative form of punishment but the Prince refuses. Meanwhile, Donald further endangers the deal by going to the airport to rescue the thieving interpreter. Not knowing what to do, Jack personally goes to Adam's house to ask him to take over the deal. Adam successfully persuades the Prince to allow Gardner Ross to handle the deal while pressing charges against the thief in Canada. Adam returns home to find his wife has attempted to overdose on prescription sleeping pills and pleads with him to let her die.
16	3	"High Flyer Down"	Stacey Stewart Curtis	Hart Hanson	1996
When a shady stock promoter that Jack knows shows up at the firm, Jack immediately calls security but when the promoter reminds Jack of a favor he owes, Jack decides to hear him out. He pitches Jack on a hemp company. Jack has several members of the firm examine the company and they all get excited about it but, knowing the history of the stock promoter, Jack remains skeptical so he hires Tommy to investigate the promoter. Tommy only finds out that the promoter has been using the Internet to promote bogus stocks lately and owes money to a loan shark. The stock promoter later damages Sally's car and when she enters the parking lot, befriends her and convinces her to have the executive committee listen to his hemp company promotion. Still skeptical of the stock promoter, Jack asks Ann to research hemp stocks on the Internet to find anything suspicious. They discover that the promoter is promoting hemp stocks on the Internet and figure out that the promoter wants a reputable firm like Gardner to announce its support for the company, thereby increasing stock prices so he can make a fortune selling his stock while opening up Gardner to lawsuits. Jack buys the entire issue on his personal account. When the stock promoter meets with the Gardner executive committee, he learns that Jack has bought the company and forced him to sign an unpalatable contract or be charged with stock fraud. He reluctantly signs. Grant invites other members of the firm to watch a new derivatives trading program he has created but nobody is interested. When only Donald shows up to see it, Grant allows him to try out the program for himself. Donald gets immersed in Grant's video game like trading device but soon breaks it. Jack's sister starts work in the cage. A microfiche explosion and a brownout cause the firm to lose record of all trades—around $10M—for that day. When Adam finds out, he threatens to fire someone unless a viable solution is found. At a board meeting, Cathy is about to get fired when she finds a way to bluff the bank into getting back securities deposited by Gardner the previous day so the firm can account for them. A financial TV show wants to interview Sally. She is initially hesitant until the host tells her that the topic is Cuba, a subject she is interested in. Sally later appears on a TV financial program to defend Canada's interest in Cuba. Jack's nephew is facing expulsion from school if he gets into any more trouble. Cathy asks Jack to take her nephew to a school dance. Before they go to the dance, Jack takes him to Tommy's boxing class that he has agreed to coach in Tommy's absence. His nephew shows promise and asks Tommy to join the boxing club. Tommy agrees to let him join on the condition that he not drink, smoke, do drugs or fight outside the ring. At the dance, Jack's nephew is accused of drawing graffiti on a wall. The principal plans to expel his nephew but Jack intervenes by telling her that, as a rule of the boxing club, he will have to maintain a C average and won't be able to fight outside of the ring. She decides not to expel him. Contrary to Jack's encouragement, Cathy disallows her son from boxing.
17	4	"Trudy Kelly"	Kari Skogland	Raymond Storey	1996
After seeing Sally on TV, a popular TV personality named Trudy Kelly who has been having trouble renegotiating her contract over image control issues and profit distribution approaches the firm wanting to buy her employer out. Sally agrees to act as the lead in the Trudy Kelly deal with Jack's assistance. Sally wants to try a diplomatic solution using a buy out as a last resort for Trudy's contract dispute but Trudy is uncompromising leans toward a more hostile approach. Unable to contact the head of the media conglomerate that holds Trudy's contract since he won't return her calls, Sally discovers that he is golfing and when she learns that Donald belongs to the same country club, she gets him to take her there to meet the executive. When Sally tells the media executive that she's shopping Trudy to other networks, he refers her to a section of Trudy's contract. When they check her contract, they realize that the media conglomerate owns the name and image of Trudy Kelly and cannot therefore shop her around to other potentially interested media companies. Jack's research into Trudy Kelly's operations reveal that her spendthrift ways have made her magazine unprofitable. During lunch with Sally, Ann tells her that she agrees with Jack's view of Trudy being a free spender. In light of Trudy's contract details and her spendthrift ways, Sally does not think she has what it takes to run a business and recommends that they negotiate for a percentage of the profits for Trudy instead of a buy out. When Sally meets with the communications company executives, Trudy is a no show but instead announces on her show that she will launch a management buy out of her name and image from the media conglomerate. When the Gardner executive committee meets with Trudy later, Sally outlines the sacrifices she will have to make to buy out the media company and informs her that, since Gardner will be putting their own capital on the line, someone from Gardner will be assigned to control her spending. Trudy agrees to the terms. Trudy, Gardner's bankers and the media company's executives meet to negotiate the buyout. The media company rejects their first offer. They resubmit a bid that does not include book publishing that is also rejected. Gardner finally makes an offer requiring her to give up some valuable properties she has the use of but the media executives reject the bid. When Sally asks Jack for advice, he suggests that the media company might not be willing to let go of Trudy. Finally, they offer international distribution rights to the media conglomerate with Trudy Kelly only holding English language distribution rights. The media executive accepts the deal. After the disastrous loss of a day's trading records the previous week, the firm's board members vote for Cathy to work on Marty's trading floor to improve communication between the floor and the cage. She immediately hits if off with Benny but distracted by her, Benny incorrectly enters a trade, potentially costing the firm $500,000. Feeling partially responsible, Cathy convinces him to let her help him cover it up and she uses her access to the cage to do so. The trade that Benny entered incorrectly becomes profitable but Marty knows about their cover up. He warns Cathy and Benny never to try to hide their losses again. Adams wife decides to end her life with a prescription medication overdose again. Adam reluctantly assists her. The episode ends with a shot from Adam's wife's funeral procession.
18	5	"Separation Anxiety"	Alex Chapple	Alyson Feltes	1996
In the lobby of the building, a Quebec First Nations group is holding what looks like a protest in front of the media. When Marty calls security to have them removed, Jack tries to stop him because the group are clients of Gardner Ross. A bank in Quebec had agreed to loan the First Nations reserve money to build a casino but when First Nations voted not to separate from the remainder of Canada in a referendum, the bank changed its mind and the province revoked their casino license. The reserve approaches Gardner for the money to build the casino even though they do not have an operating license. Jack thinks the province will change its mind once a casino building has been erected. First Nations is currently fighting with the province in court over the casino license. Since First Nations reserves are self-governed, Jack gives them the same advice as he would for a small sovereign country. He advises the reserve to issue bonds on the international market to raise the capital they need even though they expect that doing so will raise the ire of the Quebec government. Out of fear that by doing so, the First Nations reserve will move a step closer to becoming a sovereign nation, they expect the Quebec government to reissue the casino license and the Quebec bank to reissue the loan. In financial terms, a government is sovereign only when it can collect taxes from its citizens but in international law, the First Nations reserve is as sovereign as it was before the Europeans invaded Canada. Jack, Susannah and Donald convince a bond rating agency to publish a rating for their First Nations client, thereby paving the way for a bond issue as long as they can get the First Nations reserve to commit to allow mining on their land and get a mining company to commit to development. Adam takes time away from the office to look after his deceased wife's affairs. Marty's brother-in-law has lost money on a stock scam and the rest of his in-laws pressure him to do something about it. Marty hires Tommy to find the boiler room (business) that sold the bogus stock to his brother-in-law. After Tommy finds the location, Marty unsuccessfully tries to prepare Tommy to go in undercover so they can catch the owner/operator and have him arrested. Because he does not understand the shady world of stock promotion well enough, Tommy is ill-equipped to go undercover so Marty decides to do it himself. Marty goes to the boiler room and is quickly hired. Marty excels so much at the penny stock promotion swindle that he gets a bonus for being the top swindler of the day and is invited to meet the boss at a strip club later that evening. When Marty meets with the boiler room boss at a strip club later, he receives a further payment in cash and discovers that the man who hired him is actually the boss. He plans to expand and wants Marty to train new swindlers in exchange for 40% of the profits. Jack finds Marty at the boiler room. When the boiler room operator sees Jack, he assumes Jack is a loan shark and offers to pay Marty's debt. Later on, the police raid the boiler room and arrest all of the sales staff. Benny and his wife separate after 22 years of marriage. Cathy invites Benny over for dinner. The Gerald Graykirk of Graykirk Mining agrees to mine the First Nations' mineral resources if Gardner can get the reserve to agree to a binding contract. Gardner sends out a trial balloon in the form of a draft Green Sheet (Investment Term) to see how the market might react to a sovereign debt issue from a First Nations reserve. Ann finds a European client willing to buy half of the offer. After some Quebec clients decide to close their accounts with Gardner Ross as a result of the firm's attempt to float the First Nations bond issue as sovereign debt, Sally and Adam question Jack's decision to involve the firm with the issue. Jack defends his decision, pointing out that it's a business decision and not a political one. When Adam later speaks with one of his fellow private club members who has strong ties to the Prime Minister's office, it is implied that the national government views the designation of the First Nations bond issue as sovereign as separatist. During an executive committee meeting later on, Adam sides with Jack on the issue. Both expect the Quebec government to reconsider the casino license. Even though the firm is losing clients, Adam also wants to see the issue through to the end. When the executive committee meets with the First Nations leaders later, the Quebec government has reissued the casino license and the Quebec bank has reissued the loan guarantee with lower interest rates and better terms. Even though Gardner will receive a generous commission for its services, Jack still hopes the reserve will continue with the bond issue since it would give them far more capital than the loan but the reserve leaders prefer the loan only since it is more certain. It is implied later that Adam influenced the outcome and will receive something in return for it. He is also offered dinner with the Prime Minister.
19	6	"Spin"	Stacey Stewart Curtis	John Krizanc	1996
The firm discovers that they have missed a $2M payment on something called a Cartesian bond that Cedric sold. They think it's a clerical error but, if it's not, the firm will be liable for $32M. The Cartesian bond's first payment was made by Cedric according to the large fund that holds the bond but Gardner has no record of the payment being made. The second $2M payment is now due but, with Cedric gone, nobody at the firm knows anything about it. Since the bond has no credit rating, they suspect it's a bogus issue. When Sally goes to the address on the bond issue to investigate, she finds an empty lot in an industrial area. Since the compliance department has to report anything shady to the commission and fearing that her father might have made a bogus issue, Sally hires Tommy to investigate the Cartesian bond. Tommy's investigation uncovers the local phone number of an answering service. He also finds out that the output of stun gun used to kill Cedric was doubled making it more likely that it was actually a murder and not a carjacking but the police were ordered to put the case on a back burner by a higher authority. When Sally and Tommy go the answering service that answers the telephone number on the Cartesian bond, they find out that Cedric initiated service with them in person. Jack and Tommy find the teenager who doubled the output of the stun gun that killed Sally's father to try to squeeze information from him. He doesn't divulge any information but gets nervous when Tommy mentions Cedric. The executive committee learns that the firm is not liable for the Cartesian bond payments but that Sally is personally liable through an offshore tax shelter her father set up in her name the day she was born. A senator who is also Sally's godfather gives her the $2M payment she is liable for and then explains the details of the Cartesian bond. The senator approached Cedric for help creating an unorthodox but not fraudulent investment vehicle on the behalf of the Canadian Security Intelligence service (CSIS). The $30M was seed money to cover a covert CSIS investment fund. The reason why CSIS had a case file on Cedric because he was overseeing hundreds of millions of dollars of their money. The senator asks Sally to act as a front for the fund as her father did. If she refuses, they will give her the money to pay back the bond. She doesn't commit. Jack and Tommy tell Sally that they think they've found the kid who killed her father. When she wants to know why they haven't turned him in to the police, they tell her that the police have been told by their superiors to back off the murder investigation. They then ask Adam to ask one of his contacts at CSIS why the investigation is being held back. Adam asks a high-level CSIS contact about Cedric's involvement in the fund and offers to manage the fund himself if Sally refuses. He also suggests that the firm might make the existence of the fund public. The CSIS official shrugs off the publicity threat leading them to believe that they have nothing to hide. The teenager who killed Cedric had worked for the senator leading them to suspect that the Sally's godfather might have ordered her father's murder. They later confirm that the senator knew about Cedric's heart condition and ordered the teenager to use the overpowered stun gun on Sally's father. The teenager agrees to turn himself in and testify against the senator. Susannah warns Marty that a stock he's been shorting is unlikely to fall any further and, if the company wins a patent it applied for, the price will skyrocket, thereby opening Marty's short position to unlimited losses. Later, Jack and Adam meet with Marty because, to the detriment of the firm, he frequently does not take Susannah's advice. Thinking that they will need to make the $2M payment to avoid a securities commission investigation, Sally pressures Marty to have $2M in cash at the end of the day. If he sells from the firm's inventory, he will be selling at the bottom of the market. In an effort to help Marty, Cathy introduces him to self-hypnosis that uses a pendant as a way to make decisions. Marty tests the self-hypnosis technique by asking whether to buy an under performing stock. When the pendant indicates he should buy, he disregards the technique. Marty starts to change his mind about Cathy's self-hypnosis technique when the stock that the pendant indicated he should buy rises dramatically. He soon buys the pendant from Cathy and starts using it to make trading decisions. Later, when Susannah gets concerned about a large position in a cable company he has built, he ignores her and the other traders in favor of his pendant. The stock price of the cable company tanks causing Marty $1.26M in losses at the market close after one of Ann's clients sells 500,000 shares. A foreman from a pulp mill that Donald worked at as a teenager shows up at the firm to ask Donald for help refinancing after the government has decided to foreclose on it. Although Donald is perfectly suited to lead the deal, the mill manager thinks of him as a teenager and would not be comfortable with him acting as lead banker. When Donald suggest to his former foreman that he should be the one to handle the debt issue, as expected, the foreman rejects him and asks for someone older so Donald introduces him to Adam. On Donald's recommendation, the pulp mill foreman engages Adam but the two of them are not in agreement on how to raise capital. Adam thinks an equity issue would be better than a debt issue, partially because the debt issue would earn Gardner 3.5% as opposed to 6% of the equity issue. During Adam's meeting with the mill foremen, Donald undermines him by presenting his preferred way of financing so Adam dismisses him. Donald is about to quit when he learns from Susannah that the pulp mill will receive logging rights to a prime timber stand. Donald's father knows that and if they go with an equity issue, they will effectively give the pulp mill to Donald's father for far less than it's worth. This makes Donald's original plan the better course of action.
20	7	"Home Office"	Alan Goluboff	David Cole	1997
At Tommy's gym, Sally meets a nun named Connie who also coaches boxing. Tommy also gives Sally a tape of a nature and choir mash-up made by Connie hoping that she can help Connie with the business end of things. The manufacturer of the tapes cannot prevent a hissing sound and hopes that Sally might be able to help with a defect common to all tapes. Sally meets with the owner of the recording company that manufactures Connie's tapes. Sally suggests that his tapes are cheap and they hiss and he agrees. If he could sell more, he could get better tapes but he won't sell more unless he gets better tapes, putting him in a catch 22 situation. Sally learns that he makes no profit from making the tapes. Knowing that he has contacts at a record company, Sally asks Jack, who is Catholic, for help with Connie's tapes. Later, both Connie and the manufacturer appear in Sally's office overjoyed with a $25,000 offer they have received from another record company. When they received the offer, the manufacturer exercised a shotgun clause to buy out Connie for $10,000 expecting to net $15,000 when the record company buys him out. Sally is dismayed that they accepted a first offer and advises Connie to buy the manufacturer out instead. She then advises Connie to counter the record company by asking $250,000. Jack, Ann and Sally buy out the tape manufacturer for $30,000 hoping to negotiate a better purchase price from the record company. Under this arrangement, instead of receiving the $10,000 she needs, Connie will owe Sally and the others $10,000. A lawyer for the church informs Sally, Jack and Ann that they are actually in partnership with the church and not Connie herself. The church decides not to sell out to the larger record company but to market the tapes itself. Since doing so will not be profitable for at least a year, Connie will not have the money for some charity work she wants to do. Feeling responsible, Sally donates $10,000 so the nun can do her work. The firm hires Tommy to track down a millionaire prospect. Jack and Sally suggest that Adam approach the millionaire but he refuses saying that he saw the prospect shoot a duck in the water. They decide Marty should make the approach. Marty is reluctant until he finds out the prospect is worth $300M, has just closed his accounts at a competing bank and landing him as a client can greatly expand his trading capital. Since the prospect and Adam have a history, Marty cannot approach him directly. They have to make it look like an accidental meeting. Tommy quickly finds out that the client will be in a box at a baseball game that night. Gardner Ross arranges for Marty to meet the $300M prospect in a private box at the baseball game by somehow double-booking the box. While Marty and his wife are sharing the box with the $300M prospective client, his attempts to connect with the prospect are disrupted by his wife. The firm then decides to arrange a dinner meeting between the prospect with Marty and Susannah. Since the two of them are often at odds with one another, they are both reluctant to the dinner meeting together. Marty is also uncomfortable not being accompanied by his wife. When the prospect is very late, they have dinner together, smooth over their differences and actually enjoy each other's company. Just as Susannah leaves, the prospect and Marty's wife show up. The prospect had forgotten where they were supposed to meet but met Marty's wife by accident and the two of them had been walking through the theater district together to find the restaurant. Marty's wife gets suspicious at signs that Marty did not dine alone. Later on, when the $300M prospect insults his wife Barb, Marty gets angry and rudely asks him to leave the firm. Cathy's work is suffering as a result of domestic problems with her son. Cathy's son admits that the chocolates he has been selling have been stolen. Cathy agrees to pay for them and then slaps him in front of the trading floor after finding out he has lied about the theft. To retaliate, her son injures himself and then lies to social services by telling them Cathy abuses him.
21	8	"Top of the Tombstone"	Henry Sarwer-Foner	Maureen McKeon	1997
Jack's nephew tells a judge that he would prefer to live with his uncle but the judge leaves it up to Jack, Cathy and Cathy's son Sean to decide together where he will live. At a subsequent meeting, Cathy requests that the judge order Sean to stay with her. To help her case, she lies to the judge telling her that her son was in a bar the night before and Ann gave him alcohol to drink. When Jack tells Sean that it's time to return home, his nephew storms off. The next day when they find out he did not stay with either Cathy or Jack the previous and did not attend a counseling session, Jack, Ann, Cathy and Benny leave work to search the streets for him. Benny finds him and convinces him to return home. When a billionaire client announces that he needs to raise $1B to build a harbor in Jakarta, even though Gardner is not large enough to take on the deal, Jack asks him who will lead the project. Sally and Adam expect a large bank to lead a consortium but give Gardner a small piece of the action. Adam meets with the Canadian Corporate Bank of Canada's (CANCORP.) David Astin and uses the opportunity to imply that Gardner's past work helping the billionaire develop the project gives them unique insights into the project. David promises Adam a small role for Gardner if chosen to lead the issue. Sally then tasks Susannah and Donald with finding unique insights into the project. Behind the backs of the others, Jack visits the billionaire client at his boat to pitch a plan that might save him $100M. If he buys a construction company large enough to handle the harbor project for $400M, $100M of the construction costs would go back into his pocket. When Jack tells him that Gardner wants to lead the financing, he replies that Gardner does not have the capital or international reputation to lead on a deal of that size and scope. Even though his idea has been rejected, the billionaire keeps the written proposal. The billionaire later decides to buy the construction company as per Jack's recommendation but requires that the purchase price be within his current financial structure and that the commission be 0.75%. Jack negotiates first consideration on the larger harbor project if they can arrange financing for the acquisition. If Gardner is unable to do the deal, the billionaire states that Gardner will definitely not lead the $1B harbor project deal. Before Adam is to meet David Astin, he asks what ideas Jack and Sally have come up with. Sally gives him a proposal for managing the billionaire's foreign exchange exposure. When he asks Jack for information on the construction company proposal, Jack reveals that he has been talking to the billionaire prospect behind their backs. Sally and Adam are alarmed by his move because it makes them look untrustworthy to the other investment banks. They fear that if the other banks find out, Gardner will receive very little of the deal if they are not chosen to lead. When Jack returns to the billionaire client to report that Gardner is only able to raise a half of the required money, he learns that the client took his idea to CANCORP. but they were not able to do any better. Jack suggests that he take his shipping line public to raise capital but as expected, the billionaire angrily rejects the idea. Not only has he lost the deal but the larger banks now know that Gardner has gone behind their backs, potentially angering them. When he returns to the office, Jack proposes that Gardner Ross invest since the client wants to sell the financing side of his business. Doing so would make Gardner too cash strapped to join the consortium. Adam tells him that Gardner is not his firm to put at risk but he counters that it is as much his firm as it is Adams. When he hears that Sally secretly sold Adam a share in the firm equal to her own, Jack gets angry and leaves the meeting. In an effort to control the damage done and salvage some part of the deal, Adam calls David Astin. David considers Jack's actions a major breach of trust and threatens to shut Gardner out of the consortium. The trading floor starts a charity trade off with CANCORP. After Gardner loses the trade off, Marty calls his counterpart to ask for a recount. After negotiating, they agree on a draw but the two of them will go head-to-head on a long-distance run. It is only then that Marty learns that his counterpart is an avid marathoner. He tries to persuade Chris to dress up in a costume and run for him but Chris refuses. Still looking for a way to beat his competitor, Marty tries to convince Donald to disguise himself as him and run the race but Donald refuses, pointing out that Marty's counterpart is a much better runner. Marty runs the race but cheats by taking the subway to make the top twenty finishers. Seeing this, Grant is incensed at Marty's cheating. After he tells Sally about it, their conversation drifts to his new program and shows her how they can use it to manage the billionaire client's currency risk giving them a new idea to pitch to him. Sally pitches the billionaire client with a new plan. They can turn the client's ships into a public company and then swap its stock for a controlling interest in the construction company that they are unable to raise $400M for. The construction company will wind up owning the shipping company but the billionaire will have a controlling interest in the construction company. As a new company in Indonesia, the deal will also enable him to gain venture capital benefits from the Indonesian government. After the Jakarta harbor project has been completed, he will be able to buy his ships back. She arranges for him to meet Grant face-to-face so that Grant can explain the workings of the program to him. The billionaire is so impressed that he gives Gardner the billion dollar deal and hires Grant. Soon after, Jack demands his share of the firm from Sally. He is willing to pay 3 times the book value of the firm just like Adam did. Adam meets with David Astin who demands that his bank get at least 50% of the $1B deal but Adam refuses to commit. Grant uses the investment histories of Ann's clients to test a program that can predict what their next investment will be.
22	9	"Family Legacy"	Alan Goluboff	Raymond Storey	1997
Adam meets with a childhood friend named Clifford who heads a family business. He asks Adam to be the first non-family member to join the company board of directors. While Clifford was suffering from an illness, his sister wrestled control of the company from him. He has won a lawsuit to take back control of the company on the condition that the board have an objective voice which is why he wants Adam to join the board. Jack is uninterested in using the firm's capital to back Adam's seat on the board of Clifford's company and Sally is not comfortable with how much capital it will require but Adam prefers the board seat to leading the $1B deal. He wants Gardner to buy 5% of Clifford's company which, according to the analysts, will cost the firm approximately $60M. Sally doesn't think Gardner can afford more than a 2% stake. Clifford shows up at Gardner and tells Adam that the family is looking forward to him joining the board. Later, Clifford's sister tells Adam that she will oppose him becoming a board member but, after a discussion where he states his intentions for the family company, she becomes more amenable. Susannah approaches Marty with an idea to short a gold company stock because she expects the price of gold, which is at an all-time low, to fall further due to anticipated selling by two European central banks. He is totally bullish on gold and rejects her idea outright. Near the end of the trading day, the price of gold drops, thereby hurting Marty's long position in the gold mining stock that Susannah recommended that he short. That evening, the other traders get down on Marty for not listening to Susannah's recommendation. Marty tries to patch things up with her while she is watching a TV trivia game show to which she knows all of the answers to. The other traders ridicule Marty for not having any trading ideas. When he looks through the newspaper for ideas, he finds an advertisement to enter Quiz Whiz, the TV game show Susannah knew all of the answers to the previous night and tries mend bridges by getting her on the show. He even asks Sally who is friends with the producer of the show to get Susannah on but she refuses to pull any strings. He later pretends to call the producer of Quiz Whiz on Sally's behalf to get Susannah on the show. In return for the favor, Marty commits Sally to being a guest host on one of his other shows. While Marty is trying to get Susannah prepared for Quiz Whiz, she admits that her call on the gold mining company was actually a tip from an old roommate and did not come from any analysis. Susannah enters the game show. After she leaves, Marty collects money from the other traders who were probably betting against the two of them reconciling. Although Gardner has landed the $1B deal, due to their comparatively limited capital, they face an uphill battle making it profitable unless they increase their share of the deal. A new CANCORP. VP named Victor Kennilworth tries to exploit Gardner's limited cash availability and make a name for himself by demanding a larger share of the deal than the other two participating banks. Gardner cannot do the deal without him. Jack wants to increase Gardner's stake in the deal but Sally is unwilling to put the firm at risk. Jack suggests asking their large South Korean shareholder to participate as a backup even though non-Canadian financiers cannot participate in the deal. Their discussion is interrupted by Victor, the new VP at the larger competing bank, who invites Jack out to play basketball. After basketball, Victor tells him that he intends to scoop the $1B deal but offers him $100M of it after he does. Jack turns down the offer. Jack learns that their South Korean backer decided to pull out of the Jakarta harbor project. Knowing that Adam is responsible, he confronts Adam over it and threatens to sue him, possibly jeopardizing Adam's ability to join Clifford's board. Jack tells him that when he gets on the board, he must steer the company toward a large investment in the Jakarta harbor project to make up for the loss of the South Korean backer. Since Clifford's company makes dredgers and the Jakarta harbor project needs them, the two firms are related. When Jack and Adam pitch the idea to Clifford, he angrily rejects it and withdraws Adam's board membership offer. Clifford refers to Adam as "scholarship boy" and later Adam tells Jack that his father's business collapsed while he was attending school. Not being able to afford a prestigious private school anymore, Adam's mother got the headmaster to accept him on scholarship. Before Clifford called him "scholarship boy", Adam thought it was a secret. Grant confides in Ann telling her that he misses Gardner Ross. Jack later asks the billionaire client for Grant to return to Gardner and he allows Grant to return. Donald's mother leaves his father and turns to him for support. Knowing of Donald's mother's situation, Sally suggests getting financial advice from a professional for her. Donald gets Ann to help her but his mother is too distraught. Donald meets with his father and arranges a meeting between the three of them the following day. When they meet, Donald's mother intimates that she is more interested in Donald and his father reconciling than in leaving him. Tommy has to attend an event and needs a date because he knows a former girlfriend of his will be there. Sally volunteers but he doesn't take her seriously but when Tommy picks Sally up for the event, she is dressed in a revealing outfit. They become intimate. The billionaire client and Clifford's sister meet at Gardner. The client is open to their proposal but does not commit. After the meeting, Clifford's sister supports Adam's election to the board of her family-owned company. Later on, in a meeting with the Adam, Clifford and his sister, after they all come to agree on the direction of the company, offer Adam 1% of the company, a $12M value. When Victor shows up at Gardner, Jack offers him 9.5% of the deal and not the 10% CANCORP. was pushing for. Victor thinks that Gardner Ross cannot do such a large deal without them until Jack informs him that Clifford's family-owned firm will be participating. Later, Victor sees that Gardner can do the deal without CANCORP.'s participation, he agrees to join on Gardner's terms.
23	10	"Emeritus No More"	Gordon Langevin	Alyson Feltes	1997
The episode begins with Adam, Sally and Jack being interviewed on a financial TV show. Adam walks off the show after the host falsely suggests that he owns a hobby farm and has political aspirations. Marty, who is watching the show from the trading floor, gets mad when the host mentions a $65M draw down required on the following day. Jack and Sally tell Marty they need $65M in escrow by the end of the day but Marty has been suffering losses recently. When Grant sees him on the trading floor at an unusually early hour, Marty tells him that he is at 40% of his maximum allowable draw down and will need over $90M to get to profitability. Grant offers to help. After squash, a friend who owns a sport management company tells Adam that a larger sport management firm has offered to buy him out. Having heard negative things about the acquiring sport management company, Jack advises Adam not to proceed with the acquisition. Donald and Adam explain to the sport management company owner that the acquiring company is in a financial position that requires it to continually buy other companies or falter. After Adam explains that the acquiring company will try to acquire his company by hostile means if rebuffed, they decide to enact defensive measures. Soon after, the acquiring sport management company turns hostile. Adam and Donald explain the poison pill as a way to make the purchase of his company too expensive to the acquiring company. The also consider using Gardner Ross's capital to buy out the acquiring company since it has a weak financial position. The client learns that his athletes want his company to be bought by the larger firm. Adam finds a way to take over the acquiring sports management company without using Gardner's money. Instead they approach the large shareholders of the acquiring firm and propose a merger with their client ultimately being appointed to manage. If they can get the acquiring firm's super agent to go along with the deal, the shareholders are likely to approve the merger. Adam and Donald approach the super agent with the proposal. He considers it but with him as the manager of the new entity and not their client. Adam decides to go ahead with the deal without telling his client but ensures that the client is well compensated. When Adam and Donald meet with their sports management client later, Adam does not admit that he agreed to go along with the super agent's demands that his client not be made manager. An environmental company releases a report asserting that the Jakarta harbor project will have a negative impact on the environment causing an environmentally friendly mutual fund that has subscribed to $100M of the offering concern over the report forcing Gardner to pay attention to acknowledge the report. Later, a marine biologist debunks claims in the environmental report and Gardner learns that a large bank rival commissioned the report. Even though the environmental mutual fund company has seen both the report that claims environmental damage from the Jakarta harbor project and the report refuting those claims, they are not willing to risk their reputation by holding a stock in a company that might be environmentally damaging and pull out of the deal as a result. Jack and Sally try to speak with Victor over the phone but he refuses to speak with them directly, instead talking through his assistant. His assistant tells them that the large bank will be willing to take up 9.5% of the shortfall, which would force Gardner to raise the rest of the $100M shortfall within a day. They offer to allow him to take the full share of the deal that the environmental company dropped. When Victor responds by saying that it would be happy to take over the deal, Jack angrily hangs up. He then goes directly to the trading floor and confronts Marty before Ann pulls him away. Doubting Chris's loyalty, Marty confronts him. At market close, Jack and Sally ask Marty for the floor's position. In order to stay within the governing body's capital regulations, the trading floor will need $12M from corporate finance. When Marty threatens to quit, Sally calls him on it. Later, the executive committee agrees that Marty is most responsible for the firm being unable to meet its capital obligations. The firm is likely to miss its drawdown date the following day. Adam leaves the meeting after Sally suggests his role there is as a figurehead. The firm cannot raise the shortfall by borrowing from any of its regular banks because all of them are in on the Jakarta harbor deal. They are forced to ask the large Korean bank that owns 8% of Gardner. Doing so saves the firm from having to default on the deal but will also make the deal profitless. Sally admits to Jack that she leaked the draw down date. Her intention was not to harm the deal but, thinking the deal was in the bag, it was to brag to the other banks about Gardner's enhanced capability to handle large deals. Near the end of the episode, Marty storms into Sally's office and refuses to resign. She responds by admitting that she leaked the draw down and expresses her belief that he used the leak as an excuse for his poor trading performance. In the end, the executive committee decide to cover the shortfall with money from the Korean bank at a loss of their independence. Chris leaves for a position as head trader at another firm. Before he does, he admits that he leaked the false information about Adam's hobby farm and political aspirations.
24	11	"The Hands Off Approach"	Keith Ross Leckie	Maureen McKeon	1997
Adam, Jack and Sally attend the opening ceremony for a retailer that they have provided a $10M bridge loan for. Jack and Adam express concern over Sally's chumminess with the client and soon learn from a potential investor the client is a former drug dealer. Sally announces that a $30M private placement for her retailer client is oversubscribed. Later, a designer who worked for Sally's retailer client shows up at the firm drunk and demanding $500,000 for work she allegedly performed but was not compensated for. During a meeting with Sally, her retailer client claims that he had offered the drunk designer a job to help turn her life around but the work she did was so poor that he could not accept any of it. He then goes on to pitch Sally on a property he wants to buy in Montreal despite having previously told his investors that the firm planned to consolidate over the next year and not expand, effectively misrepresenting himself to his investors. Sally later goes to the grand opening of the store to find it locked. When she meets with her retail client later, he claims that the fire marshal refused to allow the store to open. He also tells her that, despite her warnings, he has made an offer on the Montreal property. As a result, he will not be able to make a $1M payment the following day. Sally tasks Tommy with investigating her retail client's activities in Montreal. She then asks Ann if he is still involved in drugs. Later, she learns that there was no spot check by the fire marshal. When she tries to call the retailer, she learns that he is in Montreal. When he does not make the bridge loan installment, Adam and Jack immediately vote to sell it to a vulture fund. Following that course of action would likely get them 50% of their money but Sally later decides to force the client into receivership hoping to get more and gain satisfaction. Adam suggests she decide what to do after informing the other investors and gaging their sentiment on the scenario. Tommy learns that Sally's client is buying the building in Montreal as a favor to an old friend and drug dealing partner who contracted AIDS in prison after getting busted for drug dealing. Ann tells Sally that she is sure that the retail client is not involved in the drug trade because he got her out. Later, when they speak with an investor representing the other investors, they learn that the other private placement investors are supportive of the deal. The executive committee reconsiders killing the deal. When she sees him later, Tommy tells her that he has learned that the retailer stopped dealing drugs when his now AIDS suffering partner got busted. When Sally confronts her client, he hands her a check for a half of what is owed. She responds by telling him he good at retail but bad at business and informs him that she will place his company into receivership unless he gives up a half of the company for the $10M he owes the firm. Gardner's role will be to hire a CEO and approve all financing. After Sally agrees to let him purchase the Montreal property to help his friend, he agrees to her terms. The trading floor's losing streak continues. Donald, who has been assigned to liaise with the South Korean bank, announces to the executive committee that the bank wants Marty fired after a multi-week slump. Jack and Adam do not want to fire Marty but know the Korean bank will demand a seat on the board if they ignore the dismissal request. Later, a headhunter who specializes in placing traders shows up at Gardner Ross. In fear of losing his job, Marty resorts to technical analysis for trading ideas but the next day, Marty breaks his losing streak as a result of Susannah's recommendations. Happy with the previous day's profits that came from Susannah's recommendations, Marty convinces her to stay on the trading floor so she's more available for consultation. The traders immediately overwhelm Susannah by consulting her on every decision they make. Accustomed to making trading calls only after extensive research, Susannah quickly gets flustered by the traders who expect instant answers. Marty starts to hear a voice inside of his head that tells him what to trade again. To her embarrassment, a picture of Sally and Tommy displaying affection for each other publicly gets published in the gossip column of a local newspaper. Tommy and Sally argue over her discomfort with their public displays of affection. Jack learns that Ann had a relationship history with Sally's retailer client. At the end of the episode, Jack and Ann end their relationship. After the headhunter suggests that he should be part of the trading floor, Grant asks Marty who is in charge of him. Marty sends him to Adam. Grant incessantly updates Adam on his current profit/loss until Adam, tired of the constant interruptions, makes Marty his boss. When Grant tells Marty, he immediately confronts Adam over the apparent plans to replace him as head trader. The headhunter hires a new superstitious currency trader named Hans on a trial basis to replace Chris. Realizing that the firm was not head hunting a replacement for him, he thanks Adam.
25	12	"Middle Ground"	Giles Walker	Raymond Storey	1997
The episode begins with a pitch by a friend of Adam's in the business of selling old refinery equipment to Third World countries. A package of gift flowers arrives for Sally. When they open it, there is a pipe bomb inside that starts to smoke so the staff is evacuated. They continue their work in a bar downstairs until they can return to the office. The executive of the refinery equipment company blames an environmental group that Donald belongs to for the bomb scare. The leader of the environmental group soon arrives at the firm to deny responsibility for the bomb scare but tries to persuade the executive committee not to get involved with the used refinery equipment company. When rebuffed, he threatens to hurt the firm through legal means. The executive committee decide that Jack and Donald should go to the Honduras to verify the claims made by the environmental group. As they are preparing to travel, Adam's friend rushes in with the news that overseas insurers are pulling out and a government agency is reviewing grants and aid received. Adam suggests his friend go to Honduras with Jack and Donald. He also decides to be interviewed by a reporter about the bomb threat. During the interview, he discredits the environmental group. Adam's friend, Jack and Donald fly to the Honduras together to inspect a plant that has been reassembled there from an old Canadian plant. When Jack tells Donald to lighten up on his inspection, Donald points out that although Adam's friend claims the plant employs 280 workers, they have only seen about 20 people there that day and has concluded that their tour is really staged and does not reflect the reality of day-to-day plant operations. Donald discovers that the plant is releasing a highly toxic gas into the atmosphere. In Canada, with its wide open spaces, there is no effect but in the Honduras, it poisons the local population. Marty tells Cathy he is not comfortable with her and Benny's relationship. After Grant leaves his office, someone hacks into the Gardner Ross computer network. Grant notices the company's computers have been hacked the following morning. The leader of the environmental group shows up at Gardner's offices with many of the firm's shareholders who also belong to his environmental group. He gained access to Gardner's shareholder list by buying one share of the firm. Along with his group, a man with a laptop and a backpack holding something else sneaks into the office unnoticed. He hacks into the phone system causing chaos on the trading floor. Soon after, the trading floor's computers are shut down followed by the power forcing the traders have to evacuate to an emergency floor. The leader of the environmental group tells Sally and Adam that his group is not responsible. When Cathy goes to Grant's office she encounters a man who confines her to the room and activates a bomb. Leo, the suicide bomber then takes her to the office where Adam and Sally are located. He forces Adam to call the police to tell them of the bomb and advise them to clear the building. When the phone rings, Leo ignores it. Agitated by Adam, Leo forces him to his knees and handcuffs him to his desk. When the phone rings again, Sally answers it and hands it to Leo, telling him the police are on the other end. Leo immediately hangs up the phone. When Cathy starts crying, out of sympathy, Leo allows her to call her son. When she picks up the phone, the police are on the line. She responds to their questions by pretending to talk to her son. From a bar where most of Gardner's staff are, Grant tries to get all the information he can by hacking into Leo's home computer. Grant finds that although Leo follows the environmental group closely, he is not a member. Jack asks Grant to hack into Adam's office computer. Adam begins to write a cashier's check hoping that money will persuade Leo to leave but it only agitates him further. Leo then activates a device that will cause the bomb to detonate if he is killed. At that point, Adam, considering that Cathy is the only one with dependents, tells her to leave. Leo allows her to go. He asks Sally if she has children. In an effort to protect her, Adam lies and says she does but Leo, who has downloaded the company's personnel file knows that neither Adam nor Sally have children. He also says he doesn't have children and considers all three of them expendable. Feeling that their situation is hopeless, Adam and Sally start to laugh as they look back on their lives. Leo gets agitated and when the phone rings, he makes Sally answer it. The police have patched into Adam's computer and they have the leader of the environmental group on the other end. While Leo is looking at the computer, a police sniper kills him but the bomb doesn't go off as Leo claimed. Sally and Adam join the rest of the staff at the bar downstairs. When the leader of the environmental group arrives to express his regrets. Sally angrily tells him that, by using inflammatory speech, he is responsible for Leo's death. The executive committee meets with Adam's friend and agrees to proceed with the deal contingent on the outcome of an independent environmental assessment commissioned by Gardner Ross. Also, his firm must donate 1% of annual profits to an environmental impact fund. Gardner verified Leo's claims with researchers at 2 different universities who both confirm they are not without merit. In his defense, Adam's friend claims that the plant surpasses both Canadian and Honduran standards but when Adam suggests he approach another bank, he agrees to the terms.
26	13	"Us and Them"	Alan Taylor (director)	Hart Hanson	1997
The show begins with Adam announcing to the board spectacular returns from both the trading floor and corporate finance when Mike returns from South Korea to interrupt the meeting. The Korean bank has given him their proxies to attend the board meeting and vote on their behalf much to Jack, Adam and Sally's consternation. He also informs them that he is under instruction to request a seat on the executive committee. Privately, Adam suggests that they quietly buy back shares to consolidate their position to avoid giving up control. Aware of Ann's interest in corporate finance, Jack suggests that they invest in a software project together but she initially declines due to their personal relationship. Ann later asks Grant for his opinion on the software company. When she learns he doesn't like it because the package they offer is too user-friendly, she changes her mind about investing with Jack. Sally asks Marty to start buying Gardner stock for the firm even though the price is high due to the Jakarta harbor project deal. Knowing of their relationship, the other traders approach Ann to find out why the firm is buying its own stock. When she tells them the two of them broke up, the traders start betting on whether they will get back together again or not. During a lunch meeting with David Astin, it is revealed that Gardner scooping the Jakarta harbor project from the big bank has caused David some difficulty professionally. The chairman then pulls Adam aside and apologizes before saying he intends to merge Gardner into his bank with Adam becoming his successor. Later on, back at the firm, when Adam tells Jack and Sally about the offer, they all decide that he should stall his response to the acquiring bank's overtures. Gardner's stock is rising as a result of buying by the acquiring large bank. Marty tricks Sally into confirming that Gardner is in play. Victor arranges a meeting between himself and Jack. He discloses that he knows the terms of the loan that Jack took out to buy his share of Gardner Ross at 3 times book value and claims his bank bought the debt of Jack's load issuer. If Jack does not agree to sell his shares of Gardner, the large bank will foreclose on his loan. When the shares hit the market, the large bank will then be able to buy them on the open market. Jack will have to repay the loan or the large bank will call it. David Astin later warns Adam that if he does not cooperate, the large bank will not abandon the takeover attempt and, if it succeeds there will be no place for him at the merged firm. When Jack and Sally discuss it later, neither are sure if the large bank is bluffing. He suggests that she buy his shares back from him but, due securities commission regulations, she cannot. If he sells to Gardner, the large bank will only need 35% of the firm to take it over. Since this information would give Adam a lot of leverage, they decide not to tell him. Since Jack bought the shares at 3 times book value, he will suffer a loss he sells them back to Gardner at market value so instead of buying his shares, Sally offers to finance the debt he had to incur to buy them. He negotiates several extra guarantees before they come to agreement. Donald tells jack that a bug in the program will cause a 2 month delay in the release by the software company. Concerned about the delay, Ann decides to pull out of the deal. Due to his current financial instability, Jack also pulls out. Marty notices that the acquiring bank's stock price is also rising. They figure out that a Japanese firm is attempting to acquire Cancorp. When Mike tries to enter an executive committee meeting, Adam locks him out. They all ignore his pleas to get in. When he later demands to know what happened at the meeting, they hint that they were planning his surprise welcome party. Sally meets with David Astin who promises to put her in charge of international deals with full autonomy from Adam if Gardner is merged into the larger bank. Knowing that Adam has been offered chairmanship, she calls him on his lie since all departments would have to fall under his supervision. Astin responds by saying that either of the two offers can be taken. A press release announcing that Cancorp. now owns 20% of Gardner takes the firm by surprise. They then realize that the Korean bank, after buying Mike's Gardner Ross shares, has partnered with the acquiring bank to take over Gardner. Mike is removed from the executive committee. Marty proposes that the best thing to do might be to help the Japanese bank that is trying to acquire Cancorp who is in turn trying to acquire Gardner by buying enough of the Japanese bond to catch the large bank in a short squeeze. If it works, the large bank will not be able to reach its commitment and they will lose their license to trade in Japan. Donald informs Jack that he is unable to find any investors for the software development company. When he realizes that Ann has killed the deal by getting everyone to buy the other software company, he confronts her. Having to finance the whole deal himself has him facing bankruptcy. Ostracized by the other traders, Ann later quits. Benny decides to help Jack by investing most of the $600,000 that Jack is on the hook for himself. Cathy, Grant and Donald agree to help out by participating too. Tommy turns down a job offer that Sally helped him get. Jack has an altercation with Victor Kennilworth. After Victor suggests that Jack got his kicked by his girlfriend, Jack punches him. On the trading floor, when the price of the Japanese bond rises, they ignore a buy order from Cancorp. Soon after, Cancorp begins selling its stake in Gardner. Marty's plan worked, thereby saving the firm from takeover. Adam purchased 500,000 shares of the large bank through Ann. David Astin shows up at the firm to congratulate Adam on his profit from the trade. Cancorp's stock is rising high enough to prevent its takeover by the acquiring Japanese bank. David accompanies the police to arrest Jack for assault. He also warns Adam that it is only a matter of time before Gardner Ross is taken over by a larger bank. When Jack's nephew learns that the police are looking for Jack but have not found him yet, he goes to an industrial park to find his uncle sitting on top of a large tank, drinking and looking at the city skyline. When Jack tells him to leave, he stubbornly stays. The season ends with them yelling together.
