= Kim Huffman =

Canadian actress

- Born: St. Catharines, Ontario, Canada
- Other names: Kymberley Huffman
- Occupation: Actress
- Years active: 1989–present

Kim Huffman (sometimes credited as Kymberley Huffman) is a Canadian actress born in St. Catharines, Ontario. She trained to be an opera singer, but is most known for her television and cinema roles.

== Career ==
Huffman played Lisa Trekker in the Channel 4 production of Dennis Potter's Lipstick on Your Collar. She also played Donna in the Toronto production of Mamma Mia! from 2004 to 2005. She also played Cosette in the original Mirvish production of Les Misérables at the Royal Alexandra Theatre.

In the Canadian television drama series Wild Roses, Huffman played the female lead (Maggie Henry).

== Filmography ==
=== Film ===
Year	Title	Role	Notes
1992	Project Shadowchaser	Naomi	Direct-to-video
1994	Sleeping with Strangers	Teri	
1999	The Fall	Lisa Warrington	
2000	The Spreading Ground	Mrs. Osterman	
2001	The Cave	Marcie Nussbaum / Marjoke / Girl at Camp	
2002	Looking for Leonard	Jo	
2002	K-9: P.I.	Laura Fields	Direct-to-video
2002	Three and a Half	Maja, Susan, Marie	
2012	Ben Banks	Fran Banks	

=== Television ===
Year	Title	Role	Notes
1989	Friday the 13th: The Series	Erin	Episode: "Femme Fatale"
1990	Counterstrike	Cop	Episode: "Cinema Verité"
1992	Jeeves and Wooster	Pauline	Episode: "Safety in New York (or, Bertie Sets Sail)"
1993	Forever Knight	Forever Knight	Episode: "If Looks Could Kill"
1993	Lipstick on Your Collar	Lisa	4 episodes
1993	The Hidden Room	Jean	Episode: "Marion & Jean"
1994	Kung Fu: The Legend Continues	Nan Clark	Episode: "The Gang of Three"
1996–1998	Traders	Ann Krywarik	41 episodes
1998	The Outer Limits	Amanda Harper	Episode: "To Tell the Truth"
1998	Recipe for Revenge	Carly Hunter	Television film
1999	Lethal Vows	Catherine Moray	Television film
1999	Murder Most Likely	Linda Martin	Television film
2000	The Hunger	Luann	Episode: "The Sacred Fire"
2000	Foreign Objects	Foreign Objects	Television film
2002	Family Law	Lawyer	Episode: "Ties that Bind"
2002	Escape from the Newsroom	Julia / George's Young Mother	Television film
2002	The Eleventh Hour	Leslie Grossman	Episode: "The Source"
2003	Puppets Who Kill	Femme Fatale	Episode: "The Payback"
2003	Open Mike with Mike Bullard	—	Episode dated 5 March 2003
2005	The Newsroom	Animated - Dream Woman	Episode: "Learning to Fly"
2006	This Is Wonderland	Ms. Brenner	Episode #3.10
2009	Wild Roses	Maggie Henry	13 episodes
2010	Numbers	Jean Zurlanski	Episode: "Devil Girl"
2014	The Listener	Maya	Episode: "In Our Midst"
2017	Channel Zero	Corrine Sleator	3 episodes
