= Traders season 4 =

Traders
- Season 4
- No. of episodes: 22

Release
- Original network: Global Television Network
- Original release: October 15, 1998 – April 29, 1999

Season chronology
- ← Previous; Season 3 Next → Season 5

This is a list of episodes for Traders, a Canadian television drama series, which was broadcast on Global Television Network from 1996 to 2000. The show was set in a Bay Street investment bank, Gardner Ross. Bruce Gray and Sonja Smits starred as the firm's senior partners, Adam Cunningham and Sally Ross. The cast also included Patrick McKenna, David Cubitt, Rick Roberts, Chris Leavins, Gabriel Hogan, David Hewlett, Peter Stebbings and Alex Carter.

== Episodes ==
No. overall	No. in season	Title	Directed by	Written by	Original release date
49	1	"Reap the Whirlwind"	John L'Ecuyer	Peter Mitchell	October 15, 1998
The season begins with Marty, who has been missing work, having a nightmare. The firm's name has been changed to Gardner Ross Cunningham (GRC). Marty is at home because the trading floor has not reopened amid rumors that Phil plans to close it permanently but Phil keeps the trading floor opened after Adam threatens to leave if he closes it. The trading floor reopens with speeches from Marty, Adam and Phil. Despite Marty's protests, Phil moves an attractive young trader name Niko Bach to the trading floor from his company. When Niko doesn't trade for the first day, Marty harasses her. Jean-Paul has been killed and Jack is a prime suspect. Sally has left the firm. When a detective questions Adam about Jack's whereabouts, Adam gives him Sally's phone number. Phil tries to lure Sally back to the bank but she refuses because she needs time away from him and the banking industry. Sally arrives at home to find Jack there. He explains that he killed Jean-Paul on purpose but, despite her pleas, refuses to turn himself in. Their talk is interrupted by the police who are searching for Jack who flees when they arrive. The following day, Sally returns home to find a detective waiting for her. After he tells her that Jean-Paul's head was severed with a 6-inch knife, she realizes that Jack did not kill him. Despite Adam's protests, Phil tells him to meet with Ian and Donald to get the Lifeshock IPO back. Adam offers Ian and Donald a healthy commission if they allow GRC to lead the Lifeshock IPO. Donald argues that the client wants to do the deal with them and not GRC but Adam counters that it's in the best interests of the client's company to do the deal with GRC. Adam also makes it clear that he is interested in Lifeshock and not the two of them returning to the firm. Phil later promises to let Ian return to GRC if Ian can bring Lifeshock back with him. Ian stipulates that he will accept if he can lead the deal, sit on the executive committee and if Donald is bought out of the deal fairly. When asked by Ian why he is so interested in Lifeshock, Phil says the product would have saved his father's life. When Adam threatens to disallow Ian's return, Phil threatens to call David Astin. He also brings a new banker named Paul Deeds to the firm, appoints him to the executive committee, tells Adam to mentor them and warns Adam not to disrupt them. When Jack goes to his gym, he finds his locker unlocked because the police opened it earlier and emptied its contents. While there, a friend of his recommends someone who can forge passports so he can leave the country. Sally hires a private investigator to find Jack.
50	2	"No Fixed Address"	TW Peacocke	Graham Clegg	October 22, 1998
Grant has been sleeping with the hooker that Chris hired to pretend to be his biological mother. The traders later figure out that Grant is paying the hooker and not Chris or Marty. When Marty and Chris tell Grant to stop sleeping with the hooker that Chris hired to pretend to be his mother, they learn that he knows she's not his mother but considers her a girlfriend. Ian and Paul reject a telecommunications deal that Adam suggests. Chris has been showing discontent with his current position as a currency trader. Since the introduction of the Euro, the importance and potential profitability of his position as currency trader has diminished. Marty offers to let Chris transfer if Chris makes a profit acting as head trader for the day. With Chris as head trader, the floor barely makes a profit for the day but still gives him the transfer he bet Marty for. Chris chooses to trade commodities but hints at his intention to take over Marty's job. Donald accepts a VP position at an investment bank in London and asks Ziggy to go with him but she decides not to go. Jack gets a new passport under a new identity. He soon contacts Grant to help him move $175M of Jean-Paul's money into an account in Turks & Caicos. Grant is reluctant at first but helps him. When asked, Jack tells Grant that he killed Jean-Paul. Adam meets with a headhunter who has received many board offers for him from many other companies but Adam rejects them. Later, Adam meets with the chairman of Cancorp. for career advice. David advises him to stay in the game if he still has ambition. After a bartender tells her that personal finance scares her, Sally begins contemplating teaching people about personal finance as a charity avenue. Sally soon starts teaching classes on personal finance as a volunteer. Jack visits Donald to say goodbye and ask for a little cash. Adam proposes that they establish a retail division to help place issues like one Ian is currently working on. When Adam tells him of the plan to establish a retail division, Marty likes the idea so the trading floor can dump its mistakes on retail clients. While trying to flee, Jack is apprehended by the police.
51	3	"Killer Instinct"	John L'Ecuyer	Shelley Eriksen	October 29, 1998
A highly successful music industry entrepreneur named Fatty Size and his entourage shows up at the firm to meet with Ian. Coming from difficult backgrounds, their first meeting is a bit difficult. Fatty wants to start a mutual fund with $20M in seed money. Ian likes the mutual fund idea but Paul and Adam express reservations. A meeting between the executive committee and Fatty is arranged. Adam and Paul express their reservations over the potential size of the fund. Anticipating this, Ian shows up a little late with Jamaican food from a successful restaurant chain as an example of a business the mutual fund could invest in. Both Adam and Paul leave the meeting more receptive to Fatty's mutual fund idea. Paul later expresses reservations over the mutual fund to Adam and tells him that if it fails, he does not want to be in any way responsible but Adam likes the fund's potential to raise GRC's profile and possibly bring in more business. Ian suggests that Fatty take his record label public but Fatty refuses, saying that he prefers the autonomy of keeping it private. Sally asks Adam to be present at Jack's bail hearing. She also hires a lawyer for Jack, visits him in jail and tells him that, since Jean-Paul was killed when someone cut his head off with a knife, Jack is not responsible for his death. Adam shows up at the bail hearing but a hostile judge sets bail at $1M anyway. Jack's rejects his lawyer's proposal to plead guilty to a manslaughter charge. Not wanting to spend 3 years in jail, Jack later calls Sally to tell her he will jump bail and promises to make it up to her. Niko suspects that the president of a small, oil-producing country is dead but his death has not been announced to the general public yet. Thinking that buying resources might be a good way to play the situation, she pitches her idea to Marty who loudly rejects it. At the end of the trading day, Marty blows his stack when he discovers that Niko went with her hunch about the president being dead and set up positions to profit from it. Later in the evening, after Niko's suspicions prove correct and positions profitable, Marty asks her to explain how she knew the president was dead and she does. Ian visits Sally at her volunteer personal finance workshop to ask her to look at some proposals he's considering. When Ian stops by Sally's house to drop the proposals in her mailbox, she is still up and invites him in. They drink, talk and wind up in bed together. In the morning, she makes it clear that she does not want it to be the beginning of a relationship. Jack arrives in Turks and Caicos.
52	4	"I'll Sleep When I'm Dead"	David Straiton	Peter Mitchell	November 5, 1998
The episode begins with Jack partying with two hookers on an expensive boat he's purchased. The following day while on the beach, Jack meets an attractive local woman named Martha who runs a property development and suspiciously knows a lot about him. He later visits the property developer to discuss investing in one of her projects. Jack decides to invest in his new friend's development as a silent partner. Over dinner, Jack commits to a $4M investment in Martha's project. The two quickly become intimate and spend the night together. While they are together, Martha gets a phone call with news that the government has decided to pull out of her deal, Jack offers to make a larger investment in the project. When Jack goes to his bank in Turks and Caicos to get the money to invest in Martha's company, he learns that Sally has gotten Grant to transfer the money back to her. A detective shows up at Sally's class and threatens to charge her with aiding and abetting Jack's flight. She responds by threatening to complain of police harassment. When she returns to the class, she proposes to her students that they pool their funds to invest in the stock market together. At the next class, Sally comes up with $5,000 to invest in stocks. She asks them to think about which companies they want to buy. Ziggy is accepted to University of Toronto's MBA program. When Ziggy is unsure of whether to attend business school due to the high cost, Ian suggests she try to get the firm to pay for it. When she approaches him, Marty laughs at Ziggy's request for a letter of recommendation for the firm to pay for her MBA. When Ziggy asks him for help more seriously later, Marty seriously replies that he will not help her but when she later asks the executive committee if the firm will sponsor her MBA studies, Adam agrees to it. Even after Ziggy has received a commitment from GRC to pay for her MBA, Marty further discourages her from studying. Adam and the head of another investment bank come to an agreement on the purchase of the retail division of their bank. At an executive meeting, Adam and Paul argue over which retail firm to buy. Each has their own preference but Ian is more interested in setting up a mutual fund. A banker from Cancorp sees Adam meet with someone from the retail firm Paul wants to buy and immediately calls David Astin. On the floor later, Niko detects buy activity on the retail firm Paul wants to buy. When Marty tells him, Paul immediately orders Marty to buy stock below a certain level. When they consult Ian, he decides they won't be buying. When Adam returns to his office, he learns that the head of the retail firm has heard that he plans to buy the firm Paul wants and is angry about it. The executive committee decide on Adam's pick for the retail arm. Paul soon realizes that Adam sank his deal. At the end of the episode, Martha, who is an operative of Jean-Paul's company unable to recover money for the mercenaries shoots and kills Jack.
53	5	"The Old Man and the CEO"	Reid Dunlop	Jennifer Cowan	November 12, 1998
During a date with her, Grant's hooker Amber tries to leave to meet with another client until he pays her more to stay but after Grants sees her with another client, his perception of her and their relationship change. Grant's relationship with Amber later ends after he tells her he wants to continue seeing her but doesn't want to pay her anymore. An old friend of Adam's named Leo Baker tries to pitch him on a Montreal revitalization project but due to the heavy capital requirements and Quebec's political situation, Adam is skeptical and refuses to invest in his developer friend's project instead offering to sell him some properties he owns in Montreal. In a meeting later, Ian and Paul ridicule Adam's proposal that the bank invest in the Montreal revitalization effort. Adam and Leo present their development plan to the mayor of Montreal who seems receptive to their plan. After asking for his discretion during their meeting, Adam later learns that the mayor has publicized the development project for Montreal after Leo asked him a question about it during a press conference. The mayor later assures Adam that his conditions will be met. When Leo enters the meeting late, along with other bizarre behavior, he introduces himself to the mayor even though they had already met. Fatty, who has had poor previous dealings with them, rejects a rival black owned record label that Ian wants to invest fund holdings in. Later, Adam and Paul press Ian to convince Fatty to invest in his rival's company. After Ian makes it clear that he needs to be in full control of the fund including which companies it invests in, Fatty relents on not allowing the fund to invest in his rival. Ian becomes upset when Fatty Size later tells him that his rival has been charged with tax evasion. Still looking for ways to invest fund holdings, Ian finds several companies that might be considered racially progressive but Fatty dismisses all of them. After Ian implies that he is being unreasonable, Fatty relents. Sally tells class that she will trust Marty to invest in blue chip for her but they want to meet him in person. Marty immediately ignores Sally's instructions to buy blue chip stock and invests her students' money in an Internet startup, even betting that he can double the amount in 3 days. The Internet startup Marty invested Sally's students' money in gets busted for growing marijuana, thereby losing their money in one day. Sally becomes concerned about when neither her nor Grant has heard from Jack so she dispatches her private investigator to Turks & Caicos. Sally begins investing the money she took from Jack as if it were her own. While Sally is confronting Marty over his trading in futures for her student's fund instead of blue chip stock as she requested, she receives word that Jack has been killed. This upsets Grant when he finds out and nearly assaults Sally. Sally is careful not to tell Adam that she took Jack's money.
54	6	"The Falcon and the Showman"	Randy Bradshaw	Paul Aitken	November 19, 1998
The episode begins with Fatty and the executive committee watching a promotional for the new mutual fund. Fatty gets annoyed with Adam's sarcasm and leaves the meeting. Sally's class is ecstatic when they learn that Marty has tripled their investment. When one of her students tell her someone has been arrested for Jean-Paul's murder, she is so overcome with emotion that she has to leave the classroom. Enchanted by the quick profits Marty earned them in futures trading, Sally's class pushes her to buy newsprint futures. Sally instructs Chris not to buy newsprint futures but wants her class to think that she made the order. The price of newsprint drops $5 during the day. When Sally's class tells her they would have preferred to lose the money, she ends her volunteer work. Fearing that he may have health problems, Adam questions Leo's ability to do the Montreal deal. During a meeting with a potential investor, Leo stops talking in mid-speech. Concerned about Leo's ability, Adam insists that he get a physical check-up. After catching the Maitre D' from a private club pretend to be a doctor giving Leo a clean bill of health, Adam visits his wife and finds out that Leo has Alzheimer's disease. Leo's wife assures him that he can do the deal with Adam's help. Adam tells Leo that they can either let the proposed development die or Leo can take a back seat. The investor they met with earlier is on board. The mutual fund sellers are resistant to Fatty's fund until Ian offers them a list of prospective buyers and outlines the promotional plan. A popular Reverend appears at Fatty's club to congratulate him on the fund but later on at a press conference, the same Reverend who congratulated Fatty on the mutual fund the night before criticizes the fund for investing in companies that do not have enough black leadership or ownership possibly killing support for the fund from the black community. Ian pulls strings to have the Reverend's comments edited out of Fatty's press conference media coverage. Sally meets with Adam to discuss some projects she has been approached with. Chris offers to help Ziggy in return for sexual favors. Grant returns to the firm with a more serious demeanor, goes into his closet office, hurls the copy machine from the office and slams the door shut. Sally attempts to make amends but Grant, still angry, asks her never to speak to him again. Marty reams Ziggy out for sneaking away to study while at work. Ziggy later figures out that two companies are planning to merge by researching likely domain names for the combined entity that have recently been registered. Sally meets with someone who advises her on how to launder the money she took from Jack.
55	7	"Six Degrees of Duplicity"	Reid Dunlop	David Young (Canadian playwright)	November 26, 1998
Chris gets a visit from Rachel, a girl from his hometown who he had helped through school the previous year. She is there to tell Chris that his father wants to buy some land from Chris. He rudely blows her off. Adam rejects a proposal from a company that manufactures fertilizer from human waste. Chris approaches Paul to tell him that he has 80 acres of land that the human waste fertilizer company can buy from him. After hearing that Chris grew up in a religious community that shuns technology and the outside world, Niko takes an interest in him. Phil tells Sally that a Swiss firm has approached him to buy GRC and wants to know how she would feel about him selling the firm. Sally does not object to the deal and offers Phil some advice on how Adam might react to it. Sally relays the information Phil gave her to Adam but claims she heard it in Europe. Adam is angry to hear the rumor but later agrees to go along with Phil's sale of the bank on the condition that the acquiring firm buy half of his share of the bank at the price Phil gets now and the other half at a fixed minimum if he leaves the bank in 2 years. Sally later reveals to Adam that the Swiss buyer of an 80% share of the bank is actually a shell company controlled by her. During an executive meeting, Sally outlines her road map for the firm now that she controls it. When Paul immediately calls Phil to tell him he sold the bank to Sally, he realizes she suckered him. Phil interrupts a meeting between Sally and some clients she poached from him to confront her over her stealth purchase. Assuming he would be fired under Sally's ownership, Paul hands in his resignation but she offers him a place at GRC and he accepts. Niko also packs up to leave but Marty offers her a chance to stay and she accepts. Partially due to Leo's sickness, Adam is having a difficult time putting the Montreal deal together. Hoping to prevent any further mistakes, Adam convinces Leo to allow Ian to help out with the Montreal project. Since Ian's family is well-known in Montreal, Adam asks him to host a reception for the advisory board. Ian agrees to use his family name only if he gets equal billing on the deal. Adam refuses him but agrees to put his name on the prospectus and guarantees him a bonus. With Chris out of the office helping Paul on the human waste fertilizer deal and Ziggy writing midterms, Marty is short staffed so he grabs an employee that he doesn't know and puts her on the trading floor to help. The employee that Marty put on the trading floor uses considerable sexual innuendo to flirt with other traders at other houses and makes some successful trades as a result. When Marty tries to get the new girl back to the trading floor, he discovers that she is actually in charge of the plants and has no interest in trading. While visiting his farmland, Chris tells Paul of how he grew up plowing fields without the use of mechanical farm equipment, not having electricity, not being allowed to listen to music or watch television. It is revealed that Paul is religious. While there, an elder from the community approaches Chris to ask if he has reconsidered returning to the town. Rachel later pleads with Chris not to sell his land to a human fertilizer company to no avail. Chris cannot sell his land to the human excrement factory because the deal will return to Phil's firm. Grant voices his disapproval at how Sally used money they took from Jack to buy back the firm.
56	8	"Blood on the Floor"	Philip Earnshaw	Shelley Eriksen	December 3, 1998
The episode begins with Sally at a lab that has created artificial blood. Sally later announces the new blood substitute deal to the executive committee and asks Paul to lead it but aberrations in lab expenses at the artificial blood start-up spook Sally. When Sally and Paul press their contact at the biotech company, she admits that an aberration in lab expenditures one year was caused by a technician who had mad cow disease. While the lab was not the cause of his condition, they did have to spend the money on purification technology and the medical insurance company covered his treatment prompting a rise in insurance rates afterward. During an executive meeting discussion of the artificial blood deal, Ian offers to introduce Paul and Sally to a large potential investor who might buy the whole issue. Ian's large investor is a black man who owns a courier company. The health minister who has assured Sally that there will not be delays in approvals for the artificial blood products resigns. Since the biotech firm planned to issue debt to finance the clinical trials, they have to consider other alternatives since any investor would be unwilling to extend debt to a company that does not have a product and could face regulatory delays getting one to market. Sally suggests that they set up in an African country where they are likely to get regulatory approval quickly. Marty gets a tip about an asthma biotech company from someone who works in a lab supplier that has shipped a large quantity of mice to them. The asthma biotech stock Marty was tipped off on rises quickly after the expected clinical trial announcement occurs. Marty learns that the person who tipped him off was fired. When Marty opens a courier delivery, a box full of mice falls apart they scamper all over the trading floor causing chaos. Marty uses a fire extinguisher to kill them. Niko and Chris bet that whoever has the best trading idea wins. If Niko loses, she has to wear tasteless stockings and stilettos to his house but if she wins, he has to wear the traditional garb of the religious community he is from to his father's house. Niko shows up at Chris's house later to tell him she thinks he won their bet. Since she is not wearing the tacky stilettos and heels so he does not let her in. During a meeting, Ian invites Leo to a reception at Adam's home. For fear of what he might say due to his Alzheimer's, Adam hadn't told Leo about the reception. Ian's mother crashes the party and confronts Adam over his use of her family name to promote the Montreal project. Adam confides to Sally that Leo has Alzheimer's and can sometimes be a liability to the Montreal project. Adam visits Leo at his home and tells him in private that while Leo's reputation made the Montreal project fly, his sickness could shoot if out of the air. Adam asks him not to attend any meetings or have any communication with other partners. Leo acquiesces. Ian meets his mother later to make amends but when he tells her of how he persuaded the courier company owner to invest in the biotech company, she gets angry because the client also deals with her. When Adam is about to host a meeting with a potential investor at his home, having forgotten that they agreed Leo should not have any contact with investors, he shows up expecting to participate. During the presentation, Leo zones out and starts singing. Privately, Leo admits that he intentionally crashed the meeting because he thought he would be able to help with the potential investor since he knows her. Leo's wife asks that they name part of the project after Leo and Adam agrees. Chris was away from the floor for the day to begin building a strip club on his inherited land as a way to get back at his religious parents. Ian tells Sally that his mother caused the health minister's resignation. Adam advises him to resolve his differences with his mother. At the end, the beginnings of an affair between Chris and Rachel is hinted at.
57	9	"Little Monsters"	Gary Harvey	Graham Clegg	December 17, 1998
Adam receives an assurance from a financial institution of their intent to underwrite the Montreal real estate development project. He notes that there are a few small businesses that need to be expropriated before the construction can begin but learns that some of the buildings are owned by a biker gang. Adam meets with the leader of the motorcycle gang regarding the properties the gang is reluctant to sell. He threatens to build around the biker gang's clubs if they do not sell. The biker replies that either GRC incorporate them into the plan or neither party gains anything. Later on, after learning that their activities have become borderline legal over the past 5 years, Adam realizes that expropriating their properties would take a long time and decides to form a limited partnership with the biker gang. Adam comes to an agreement with the bikers but the other investors in the Montreal project are not pleased with the biker gang's involvement and call a meeting between the syndicate and the leader of the biker gang. At a meeting between establishment syndicate members and the bikers, Adam overcomes the syndicate members' resistance by making reference to underhanded deals each of them, including him, has made. After Marty unsuccessfully tries to talk his son Randy out of starting as a trader at another firm, he hires him to work at GRC. Marty fears that Randy will be targeted if other traders know he is his son. Before leaving for lunch, Marty gives his son $200k to trade with and immediately calls traders from other firms on the street with instructions to attack him. With the commodities desk suspiciously busy, Randy realizes that his father attempted to set him up for failure. Marty returns to the floor to find that Randy has made a profit but created several enemies on the street. Randy learns that, when he was much younger, his father once called in a bomb threat to make a record one day profit after the traders had left their desks. The fire alarm goes off and everyone leaves the trading floor. Chris and Niko slip into a room to have sex. Before leaving, Marty locks the computers so they cannot be accessed. After everyone has left, Randy, who has tripped the alarm, sneaks onto the floor to execute some trades that his father would not allow but in unable to since all of the computers are locked. Marty fires him. At the executive committee meeting, Ian presents a company that has developed an artificial intelligence method to simulate curiosity. Grant is excited about Ian's artificial intelligence deal. Ziggy uses ideas from the artificial intelligence company Ian is working with for a school paper but one of Ziggy's classmates takes the artificial intelligence idea to another firm. Ian figures out that Ziggy leaked the artificial intelligence company project information to her MBA class causing GRC to lose the deal and asks Sally to speak with her. Ziggy is fired from GRC and expelled from the MBA program after admitting that she leaked information on the artificial intelligence company. She confronts her classmate who reveals he got a $100,000 bonus for landing the deal for the investment bank where he works. Sally tasks Paul with finding an alternative use for 27 single hull tankers owned by a Halifax company. They Paul independently come up with an idea to use the oil tankers to ship freshwater to countries around the world but the federal government disapproves of Paul and Sally's idea to ship freshwater. After a glass with ice cubes falls in Sally's lap while they are talking, she comes up with the idea to ship icebergs instead of freshwater. Sally and Paul hire an expert who confirms the feasibility of the exporting icebergs. Sally and Paul's conversion of oil tankers into water transport ships is a go. Sally hires Justine, one of the students from the investment club where she taught as a volunteer. The episode ends with the bikers taking Adam for a ride around the block on their bikes.
58	10	"Spin Cycles"	David Straiton	Peter Mitchell	December 24, 1998
A baby food manufacturing client of GRC's is suspected in the death of a baby. If the company goes down, GRC will lose $7M. Adam asks Paul to delay the IPO of another food company because GRC would be seen as abandoning its baby food manufacturer if it finances another food company while the baby food manufacturer is under investigation. Sally hires a public relations expert to minimize the damage. Fearing that a causal connection will be made if it is revealed that several babies that got ill recently were using the baby formula of the baby food manufacturer, Sally, Adam, the PR expert and the leader of the baby food company prepare for the outcome of the coroner's report. The coroner's office reports that the baby died of botulism traced to the baby food manufacturer's product. During a conference call, they try to calm investor fears but the CEO of the company veers off topic. Sally threatens to stop supporting him as a client and tells the CEO to order trading of the stock halted. The CEO suspects the union head is trying to sabotage the company out of revenge. They push the CEO to take responsibility and order a total product recall before the government does. The trading floor notices suspicious buying activity on the baby food company after the halt is lifted. They learn that 5 of the 8 babies have been released from hospital but just as things start to look up, they learn of another death. This time, the product came from a unionized plant throwing doubt on the sabotage theory. Suspecting that GRC is withholding her company's IPO to bolster confidence in the baby food company, an executive from the food company Paul is leading the IPO on pulls GRC off her IPO. Suspicious because the American market consumes 50,000 bottles of its baby food each day with only one death and no illnesses, GRC hires a private investigator to do a full background check on the mother of the baby who died. They then decide to hire an independent testing agency to do a full health and safety of all baby food plants and also test random case lots of the baby food. Soon after, they learn that the government has ordered that brand of baby food pulled from store shelves. Adam, Sally and the PR consultant then try to decide on how much to compensate the affected families. An investigation into the American death reveals that the mother probably stuffed the baby food down her child's throat after death. GRC forces the CEO of the baby food company to allow the Port Moody plant to be unionized since that is where the problems were originated. Marty has a block buyer for the baby food company so GRC decides to sell some of their stake. The CEO announces to the press that the problem originated from a cooling vat in the Port Moody plant that wasn't properly sterilized. When the union leader shows up, Sally and Adam offer a 3-year countrywide deal for his union that he promises to recommend to his members. When the CEO walks in during negotiations and threatens to get bridge financing elsewhere so he won't have to unionize the plant, Adam threatens to hurt him financially. Paul is unhappy about his reputation being damaged by Adam and Sally delaying his IPO. The traders complain about poor coffee since Ziggy's firing. Ziggy starts at a day trading firm. She loses big when she doesn't sell stock in the baby food company before market close. Making it worse, some of the money was borrowed from a friend. Later, Ziggy's baby food company position looks better as the price starts to rise and makes enough profit for her to pay back her classmate.
59	11	"Sour Grapes of Wrath"	Gord Langevin	Jennifer Cowan	December 31, 1998
At the bar, a trader friend of Marty's named Doug asks him for a job so Marty gives him one. On his first day, Doug immediately tries to hit on Niko. She later sees Doug violating the Chinese Wall by snooping around Paul's desk and confronts him. Doug trades in a resource stock after seeing information about the company in the corporate finance area of GRC. Pretending to be working on behalf of a client, Rachel buys back the resource stock that Doug bought. Suspicious of his snooping, Niko and Marty ask Paul to check into the reason why Doug was dismissed from his previous employer. After repeatedly trying to throw away the plant she got for him, Grant tells the plant girl he doesn't want the plant she gave him. Seeing that she is upset that he rebuffed her gesture, he later fishes the plant out of the garbage where she dumped it. Marty discovers that Doug was fired at his previous firm for Front running and fires him. When Marty asks him why he wasn't suspended by the securities commission, Doug replies that he was sleeping with the married woman who investigated him. The plant girl sees Grant giving food to squeegee kids and takes an interest in him. When she mentions Grant's actions to him, he denies doing it. Grant later finds a present from the plant girl on his desk and removes it. Grant later asks the plant girl out for dinner. While Sally and Paul are discussing financing options for a vineyard, the owner angrily bursts into their office complaining about decisions made by a vineyard that he mostly owns but does not control due to a two-tiered voting structure. Sally suggests he divest the vineyard but he refuses. She decides to talk to the object of his rant alone. When Sally visits the vineyard, she learns that the owner has a substandard crop of Chardonnay that he does not want to bottle under his name. The vineyard client has gone to the vineyard he owns but does not control to try to force it into production and is charged with trespassing. Sally tries to convince the vineyard owner to produce wine. During the meeting, his daughter suggests the grapes are good enough for production. Afterward, Sally encourages his daughter to be more assertive. Sally arranges a meeting between her vineyard client and the father and daughter of the vineyard her clients owns nonvoting stock in. She offers to buy 51% of the voting shares at a premium to the current trading price. The father refuses the offer and leaves the meeting. Sally meets with the daughter of the family-owned vineyard and suggests either pushing for the right to vote the shares in his trust or initiate a competency hearing. She warns that her father's decisions might bankrupt the family if she doesn't. The vineyard owner's daughter threatens to sue her father if he does not allow her to put out a less exclusive vintage. After learning that one of the main financiers of the Montreal project plans to divert funds to a mall in Texas, Adam and Ian meet with the fund manager to say they will fight the decision. After a board meeting vote, the Quebec financial institution decides they will put up 40% or $200M of the original commitment. Adam asks a Quebec trust that has already committed $40M to co-lead the Montreal project. When Adam announces the Quebec trust as co-lead, the board of the large financial institution votes again to fully commit to the project. After encountering difficulties contacting his wife, Marty gets suspicious and soon leaves the office to find out where his wife is. When he finds her at the tennis club, he gives her a cell phone so he can more easily find. When he asks her, Marty's wife denies having an affair. The episode ends with hints of Barb's infidelity.
60	12	"The Last Good Deal"	Reid Dunlop	Shelley Eriksen	January 7, 1999
While Marty is reaming the other traders out for being down in a bear market, Grant walks away from the floor laughing. On the floor later, Niko goes against Marty's trading ideas and the rest of the traders follow. Angry at having his authority undermined by Niko, Marty leaves the floor early and has a conniption while alone in the elevator. Sally and Adam both hear pitches from oddball prospects. They later revisit a potential client that they had rejected before who is developing a cruise ship with long-term rental units. They suggest that he use a REIT as a financing tool. Adam and Sally propose merging both the long-term rental cruise ship company and a resort chain that they know is overextended financially into a REIT. Both parties agree. When it becomes apparent that the resort owner and the cruise ship owner cannot not work together, Adam and Sally decide to hire a manager for the REIT so each of the two can manage their respective businesses. After working hand in hand to complete the merger between the resort and cruise ship, Adam and Sally act like best friends until Adam sees Ziggy on the trading floor. Disagreeing with her rehiring, Adam and Sally go right back to their contentious relationship. Grant hires an agent named Lana to negotiate his new contract. Marty wants Ziggy back but both Sally and Adam outrightly refuse Marty's request to hire Ziggy back. Paul starts on a body armor deal. Paul is hesitant to commit to the body armor deal due to feared quality issues with vests made in Mexico. After a Mexican cop is killed while wearing one of the vests, the Mexican government seizes the Mexican assets of the armored vest maker. Having lost confidence as a result of suffering losses on the body armor deal, Paul calls his previous employer. When Grant gets Sally's signature on his new contract, he uses his knowledge of her having taken money from Jack as leverage to get Ziggy back.
61	13	"Eat the Loss"	Michael DeCarlo	Paul Aitken	January 14, 1999
Having discovered a malignant cyst on her other ovary, Sally chooses chemotherapy over a complete hysterectomy. Sally has Justine research cancer drugs in the clinical testing phase in hopes of finding a new drug that could treat her ovarian cancer. Sally meets with an executive from a Brazilian company working on a new treatment for the form of cancer she suffers from. The company is looking for a large injection of cash to conduct clinical trials and do basic research. The treatment is extracted from secretions from a certain species of toad but since toad secretions are toxic, an antidote must be used with the treatment. The company scientists claim not to know how it works. Sally wants to back the Brazilian company but Adam and Ian are skeptical. Despite their response, she decides to go ahead with the financing. With Grant's help Ian uncovers the Brazilian company as a fraud. Adam has left a trapdoor in GRC's contract so they won't pay a penalty for withdrawing from the deal. Sally meets the fraud in her office to confront him. When finished, she warns him not to commit fraud again before throwing him out of her office. Sally later confronts Adam over slipping an escape clause into the contract behind her back. Marty and his wife argue about buying a new house. Finding his son's travel ticket in his briefcase, Marty drives home during trading hours to give it to him. As he is approaching his house, he sees a man leave his yard. When he gets inside, he finds his wife just getting dressed. Suspecting she has been unfaithful, he becomes so distraught that he loses money so the other traders cancel out his trades to help him. Marty leaves the floor. Still distraught, Marty wanders back onto the floor at the end of the trading day. Instead of going home that night, he goes over to the house that Randy has just moved into with his friends, drinks beer, talks about his marital problems and plays street hockey with them until the police arrive to investigate a noise complaint. One of Randy's friends suggests that they move to a house downtown so his wife won't be so bored. After a retail investment advisor goes missing, Adam forces Paul to temporarily take over managing the accounts or leave GRC. Paul meets with an elderly couple that lost most of the money they had invested in an aggressive managed fund that was managed by the missing broker. When the missing fund manager resurfaces, Paul reams him out for losing pensioner's money even after he claims that he also suffered significant losses and also implies that he is cowardly for leaving Paul to tell the clients. Adam chides him for gambling and warns him that he will probably be investigated, charged and will not receive any support from GRC. The episode ends with Sally returning to the office of the support group.
62	14	"Price You Pay"	TW Peacocke	Peter Mitchell, Paul Aitken	January 21, 1999
The episode begins with Chris, Marty and Pail watching a nude video of Sally on the Internet. In the elevator later, Sally gets strange looks from men who have probably also seen the video. Later, Sally is amused when Justine shows her the video and explains that the photo is from a nude photography session she did 2 years before. Marty shows Ian the nude picture of Sally to determine whether it is real or not. When Ian's surprised reaction indicates that it is real, the traders settle their office pool. Sally calls her friends to find out who leaked the photos. After hanging up she notices that her hair is falling out. At the executive meeting, Paul puts forward a technology startup company focused on using high-performance computers to model the properties of new materials. The founder of the startup shows interest in a higher offer from another firm that would cause him to lose control of his company. During discussions over a game of pool, Paul learns that the married tech startup founder is bisexual when he comes on to Paul. Adam later authorizes Paul to provide better deal terms to the tech company to compete with the American investment bank. The founder of the tech company decides to go with GRC's competitor unless Paul can offer him something "tangible". He walks away from the table leaving his hotel room card behind on purpose. Paul seals the deal with the tech company founder by having sex with him. Ian makes the cover of Canadian Business prompting mutual fund offers from other firms to appear. He soon uses his newfound fame to leverage himself a raise and bonus from Adam and Sally. Some of the companies in Ian's fund started to tank while he was not paying attention. Annoyed because Ian rescheduled a meeting to Monday from Friday, his investors cancel his Monday meeting. Sally gets upset when she learns from one of the investors that Ian did not show up to a meeting and canceled another. Adam finds Marty on the floor late in the evening. Marty tells him that Marty's wife has been cheating on him. Niko ends her relationship with Chris. While speaking at an economics conference, the men in the room are inattentive, constantly whisper to one another and make private jokes to each other. To get them to take her seriously, Sally puts her nude picture on the screen and tells the room that she will continue when they have looked at her for long enough. Back at the office Sally notices Marty ogling her and tells him it was her in the picture. Paul gloats to Ian about having closed a deal while Ian's arrogance loses clients. At the bar, Paul tells the traders about having slept with his client to close the deal. Marty and Ziggy think he's joking but Niko knows he's not. She admits she has done the same.
63	15	"History Lesson"	Alex Chapple	Edwina Follows	January 28, 1999
Sally and Adam are accosted by demonstrators when they meet with a property developer at the site of a park that he is about to destroy to build on. Justine is upset that GRC is financing the destruction of her community park and suggests to Sally that GRC pull out. The developer finds what might be an historic artifact at the construction site. Sally wants to cover it up but Adam wants to report it. Due to the archaeological find, construction at the park is halted. Sally accuses Justine of leaking the archaeological find when Adam intervenes to admit that he did it. Sally considers firing him but quickly reconsiders after considering the severance pay he is entitled to. Adam's 16-year-old niece from out of town shows up at the firm and asks him if she can stay with him for a few days. At lunch, Adam's niece flirts with him Ian. Later on, Adam's niece is on a morality tirade against the trading floor when Adam returns to the firm. Later, Adam walks into Ian's office to see his niece forcing herself on Ian and immediately tries to fire him until his niece tells him that she wanted to have sex with Ian. Adam apologizes to Ian for jumping to conclusions. The traders are later amused by a paper Adam's niece wrote about the firm but Marty uses information from Adam's niece's magazine to make trades. The traders make bets on whether or not Marty's marriage will survive. Ian lands a window manufacturer M & A deal but, citing lost confidence in his abilities, Sally orders him to let Paul handle it. The window manufacturer is initially resistant to Paul handling his deal but Paul convinces him to give him a chance. The window manufacturer suggests a different company to merge with from the one Paul chose. When Paul meets with the door manufacturer that the window manufacturer requested as a partner, he quickly discerns that Ian influenced the request. Since Ian's fund is invested in the door manufacturer and a sale of it would benefit the fund, Paul accuses Ian of putting his own interests ahead of the client's. Madelaine, Sally's cancer support buddy who has had leukemia for 15 years shows up at her office to introduce herself. Later on, after nearly falling down the steps due to chemotherapy induced fatigue, Sally decides to rest in her office. Grant later learns of Sally's ovarian cancer by hacking into her computer. Niko expresses dismay at Marty's decision to trade in a company that uses child labor. After hearing Sally yell at her, Grant asks Justine about Sally's health. Adam's niece returns to Medicine Hat. He gets nervous when Paul picks her up to leave. The episode ends with Sally swapping stories with her cancer buddy.
64	16	"Great Stock'n' Roll Swindle"	E. Jane Thompson	Jennifer Cowan	March 18, 1999
The episode begins with Sally crying while her hairstylist shaves her head. Phil wants to sell his stake in GRC. Sally and Adam offer him book value but he wants an IPO. Adam suggests that an IPO would enable GRC to make acquisitions. After Phil's new girlfriend walks into Sally's office while they are talking, he admits that he wants to sell his stake because his girlfriend feels threatened by Sally. After he leaves, Justine notes that his new girlfriend looks a lot like Sally. Sally decides to offer stock to all employees. Adam later assures her that his offer to buy Phil's shares is not in any way hostile. The traders decide to band together to buy Phil's shares. Adam can afford to take Phil's 10% but it will drain his account. Adam and the trading floor each make a bid for Phil's 10%. The bids are identical so Sally asks both parties to bid again. Adam's banker advises him that a higher bid will leave him overextended. Hoping to raise his bid, Marty asks Ian and Paul to join the trading floor bid but they both reject his invitation. Adam offers Marty 5% of GRC for himself if the traders do not submit another bid. Conflicted over having to stab the traders in the back, Marty and his wife get so engrossed discussing the dilemma on the way to counseling that the miss their session. The following morning, Marty announces to the floor that they cannot outbid Adam and withdraws the floor's offer. Paul presents a chartered school that wants to raise money for expansion but Sally rejects the idea. Paul later presents a boy that attends the charter school in Alberta to the executive committee. He is well-versed in business and economics, has no friends and no hobbies but has been accepted to several top tier business schools. When Sally talks to the boy, she learns that he is single minded in his love for business and does not enjoy going to public schools since students there consider him a geek. Despite the fact that his board of directors supports the sale of his company, the CEO and 70% owner of a truck factory refuses to sell his company. Adam advises him to acquiesce or be driven into insolvency by the bidder who is also a competitor. Adam and two other board members approach the CEO of the truck manufacturer together threatening to cash out if he doesn't accept the takeover offer. Fearing that the acquiring company will simply shut down his firm and loyal to his staff, the CEO refuses to consider the offer. Adam offers to support him if he streamlines his operations and gets rid of a division. While Paul tries to convince Ian to back his charter school idea, a porn star enters the firm to meet with Ian. During their meeting, she tries to convince him that there is a large market for her female audience targeted products. Since the buyers of pornographic products are predominantly men, Ian is mostly uninterested until she mentions a product she has planned for men. Figuring out that he wants to have sex with her, the porn star gets angry when Ian meets with her just to confirm that his mutual fund will not back her venture. Niko and Ziggy notice that Sally is wearing a wig. Ziggy hears from Ian that he saw Adam and Marty negotiating before the floor's offer was withdrawn. She promises not to tell the others.
65	17	"Four Mergers and a Funeral"	TW Peacocke	Peter Mitchell	March 25, 1999
The episode begins with David Astin in a meeting with the GRC executive committee. He has heard that Sally has cancer and pointedly asks her how long she intends to keep GRC private. The men in the board room get angry but she responds by removing her wig to reveal her bald head. The chairman has an aneurysm before collapsing. In the commotion, Paul removes the chairman's briefcase without anyone noticing but later puts in on the gurney, again without anyone noticing. The traders notice that their computers have been acting strange. On the trading floor, the computers and phones go dead. Later, the phone technician figures out that Grant's pet mouse chewed through the wires on the trading floor. Since they won't be fixed until the following day, Marty gives the trading floor the rest of the day off. Adam, Ian, Paul and Sally attend David's funeral. Paul uses the opportunity to aggressively pursue as many prospective clients as he can. Adam does the same. David's second wife hits on Ian. Sally bumps into a handsome man. After he finishes signing in, she gleans his personal information from the register. When he sits next to her later, she learns that he checked the register for her name also. Feeling drowsy due to her cancer treatments, Sally nods off but is embarrassed to find herself resting her head on the handsome stranger seated next to her. When she steps outside for air, he insists on escorting her. Outside, they decide to skip the graveside ceremony together and dance at a bar with live entertainment together. Adam uses the limousine to successfully broker a deal between two telecommunications rivals leaving Paul to walk from the church to the grave. When Adam goes to the gathering after the funeral, David's first wife tells him that David considered him a true friend and asks him to make a speech. Adam calls Sally to the firm to close the deal between the two telecommunications companies. One of the telephone technicians who is still at GRC orders a stock trade after seeing the deal between the two telecommunications firms close. Chris and Rachel make amends after meeting after work by chance. While Ian and David's second wife are alone in a limousine together, he turns down her advances. Marty's wife tells him about the affair she had and apologizes for it.
66	18	"Traders Of The Lost Arcs"	Randy Bradshaw	Graham Clegg	April 1, 1999
In the Financial Post, GRC has dropped 4 spaces in the annual rankings of trading floors. In response, Adam and Sally ask Marty if they should hire someone to share the load or replace him. Marty warns his traders that Adam and Sally are not happy with the floor's performance. The traders decide to break into the trading floor of a rival firm and steal a lucky teddy bear from the head trader's desk. The traders decide to access the rival trading floor via a service tunnels when Grant returns with his girlfriend Lulu's access card. When they reach the Federated Dundas trading room, they have to keep the door to the trading room propped opened since Lulu's access card only allows them to enter and not exit the trading room. A security guard hears a laughing message Marty records for his rival, speaks with Grant while the others hide and insists on closing the door leaving them trapped in the trading room. The wife of Adam's deceased brother, who is having financial trouble, shows up at the firm to ask for financial advice. Adam's sister-in-law gives him a briefcase with all of his brother's financial records which he stays up late to examine. In doing so, he learns many things about his estranged brother's life. In hopes that they may be worth something, his sister-in-law draws his attention to some stock certificates. Adam tells his sister-in-law that she will have to sell her house to pay off all of her debts and offers her a loan but she refuses. Adam lies to his sister-in-law by telling her that one of his brother's stock certificates is worth enough to pay off all family debts. After seeing her look his number up in the phone book, Justine calls the man Sally met at the funeral. Caught off balance, she asks him out for dinner. At dinner, Daniel Booth, the man from the funeral, tells her that he's a forensic investigator who has been contracted by the Swiss bank she used to buy back GRC to her. He swears that he did not know he would be investigating her at the time they met and, due to a potential conflict of interest, was reluctant to see her but they decide to continue their romance anyway. Paul begins meeting with clients he poached from David. A Cancorp. banker confronts Adam over a deal that Paul poached. In response, Adam forces Paul to allow Cancorp a role in the project he pilfered from David's briefcase. He then forces Paul to make him the co-lead on the deal. Ian accidentally notices that Paul has stolen correspondence from David and warns him that it's bad luck to steal from the dead. From the trove of information stolen from David's briefcase, Paul offers Ian a lead on one of the deals. Sally's cancer support group buddy shows up at her office unannounced. She asks Justine to call her out of the meeting after half an hour. Sally learns that the cancer is not responding to her chemotherapy treatments so she decides to have a hysterectomy. She announces her intention to have surgery and leaves Adam in charge of the bank. At the hospital, she successfully negotiates an earlier surgery date in exchange for a $250,000 donation to the surgeon's research lab. Marty and the others escape from the Federated Dundas trading floor via a service tunnel. As they are leaving Marty has a small accident requiring stitches. While at the hospital, they discover that Sally is having surgery. To prevent the rest of the trading floor from learning of her cancer operation, Marty insists on visiting her alone. Grant stays in the hospital until Sally comes to. When she does, he apologizes for blaming her for Jack's death and tells her he does not believe Jack is dead because of her. They share a moment after she admits that she blames herself for his death. Sally's operation is successful and her prognosis promising. She gets a visit in the hospital from Daniel. The episode ends with the trading floor having an up day and Marty calling his rival to gloat about having stolen the teddy bear.
67	19	"Every Secret Thing"	Philip Earnshaw	Shelley Eriksen	April 8, 1999
Fatty Size decides to withdraw $15M from the fund, leaving Ian in a quandary. Adam hires someone from outside the firm to replace Ian as fund manager, leaving him with no responsibilities at GRC. After meeting with several prospects to no avail, Ian decides to pursue the Cancorp. deal Paul gave him. Marty convinces Adam to authorize a raise in the floor's trading limit to bet on Japanese market futures. Marty moves Grant to the trading floor. Niko warns Marty that his trades are large in relation to the size of GRC's capital base. Marty, Grant and Ziggy stay late to trade while Asian markets are opened. Despite cautions from Grant and Ziggy, Marty decides to go over limit in his Yen trade. The following morning, the trading floor is up over $10M but Grant advises against taking profits since he expects the market to continue moving their way. Marty asks Adam to raise his trading limit by $2M. Marty lies to the floor by telling them Adam raised him by $5M and they begin trading as such. Ziggy becomes nervous after Japanese equity indexes start to rise. After learning that Marty is over the floor's trading limit, the traders try to convince him to unload their position but he refuses. A reverse in Japanese government policy causes the trading floor's positions profit to reverse. Against his trader's orders, Marty decides to hold their position even though it is now a loss. After the trading floor's firms losses swell, Marty admits to Adam that he went over limit. In response, Sally gives him another $1M. Emboldened, Marty risks extending the floor's losses further by setting up new positions in Japanese securities, again against the will of his traders. Daniel tries to interrogate Sally about her suspicious Swiss transactions but she doesn't take him seriously and flirts with him. Daniel finishes his interrogation of Sally while she is still in bed recovering. After speaking with Phil, Daniel questions Sally on why she bought the bonds when he would have returned the bank to her had she asked for it. After Sally opens a present from Daniel, she learns that he was married before and had a daughter who drowned. Sally begins to tell Daniel more about the bonds but, knowing her dealings are not fully above board and he might have to report her to the police, he stops her. After receiving her purchase offer, Adam's executive client is fired by her publishing company. She suspects they learned of her plans for an online textbook. Adam learns that the publishing company his client is trying to buy has received an offer from an American bookstore chain. Adam's publishing executive client explains that the American bookstore will drop all but the publisher's bestselling writers. Adam and the publishing executive client find a way to eliminate the competing bid and buy the publisher. Adam's sister-in-law, Catherine decides to take a job in Toronto.
68	20	"Secret Information"	Steve DiMarco	Peter Mitchell	April 15, 1999
Sally returns to GRC. The hydraulics deal Paul offered Ian went to Cancorp. Ian asks Paul for another deal lead and Paul gives him an arcade. Ian suggests the arcade chain owners partner with a 30 location family hotel chain. Ian meets with the family hotel chain owner who is interested in partnering with the arcade chain only if he can have an equity stake in them but when asked, the arcade chain refuses to partner. Ian arranges for the hotel chain owner to meet with the arcade chain owner. The arcade owner tells the hotel owner that he is interested in an outright purchase and not a partnership. Paul becomes angry when he learns that Ian did not use some private pictures to blackmail the arcade owner into the deal with the hotel. With the trading floor down, Marty asks Sally for more capital to get out of their $9M hole. She allows $3M. Marty anticipates the Bank of Japan will sell off a large US bonds and treasury holdings. Marty holds his losing position against the advice of Niko and Chris. Marty turns out to be right when the Japanese government rescinds its plans for a bank bailout. After Ian and Paul leave the meeting, Adam proposes to Sally that they take GRC public. He later tries to convince Sally to take GRC public but she refuses. Later on, Sally explains to Adam how she regained control of the bank and how, under the scrutiny of an IPO, she would be destroyed and so would the bank. Adam agrees to keep GRC private but asks for joint ownership of the bank to keep his silence. Over dinner, Sally tells Daniel the whole story of how she got the $165M. She explains that Jack's mistake caused her to lose Gardner so taking his money allowed her to take back what was hers. Before leaving town for 2 days, Daniel visits Sally to tell her that he is still interested in her despite her secret. Adam is having difficulty finding a caterer for a 20 person party on short notice when Catherine offers to do it. At the party for Leo, uncomfortable with him having Alzheimer's, the bankers pay him scant attention. With most of the guests ignoring Leo, Adam suggests that he, Catherine, Leo and Leo's wife slip away from the party to go out for a walk. During a snowball fight, Adam and Catherine share their first kiss. They later spend the night together. The firm has a record trading day after Marty stayed the course.
69	21	"A Bitter Pill"	Gary Harvey	Jennifer Cowan, Graham Clegg	April 22, 1999
After meeting with a client at a strip club to celebrate a successful private placement, Paul is beaten by a group of thugs who were hired by Cancorp. None of the bankers want to visit Paul in the hospital so it falls on Ian since he is the most junior. When questioned by the police, Paul does not tell the officer why he was mugged and beaten. Knowing that Paul could not wrestle so many deals from Cancorp. without inside help, Adam presses him to admit to how he got the information. When Paul tells him of how he stole David's briefcase when he died, Adam decides to keep a closer eye on him. Paul warns Ian not to pursue any of the Cancorp. deals, admitting that Cancorp. was behind his beating. He also terminates the Cancorp. deals he was working on. When he looks into the cupboard where the photocopied deal information was, he finds it empty. Realizing Adam took the Cancorp. documentation, Paul confronts him. Chris is uncharacteristically cheerful after taking neutraceutical pills from a health food store. Adam and Sally grant him permission to act as an investment banker for the herbal medicine company where bought the pills that are making him feel good. Chris successfully brokers a deal between his herbal products client and pharmaceutical company with national distribution. He is dismayed to learn that the herbal medicine he has been taking doesn't work. Adam is pleased with the way Chris's deal worked out. Ziggy runs into Fatty who asks her to consider chaperoning one of his young stars so she feigns sickness to be Fatty's assistant for a few days. Ziggy starts to work with Stash, one of Fatty's young rock stars. Stash throws the food Ziggy gives him and a cell phone given to her by Fatty from a moving limousine. Stash later apologizes to Ziggy for his behavior. Stash appreciates the job Ziggy has been doing and wants her to continue. After learning that he will receive a $2M advance, she counsels him on what to do with it. Ziggy returns to the floor and tells Marty the truth about why she was away. He is accepting of her explanation but warns her not to look for jobs on other trading floors. Ian asks Grant to use his quantitative skills to pick winners for his hockey pool. Grant is having difficulty making picks for Ian's hockey pool until Ian tells him of a hockey almanac available on diskette. A last minute change in the hockey pool rules completely nullifies Grant and Ian's strategy. Justine is late for work because she helped a friend approach a bank for a loan. Sally loans Justine's friend $20,000 to set up a mobile cappuccino business. Sally puts Justine in charge of a newly created small business loans division. At the end, Adam is seen using Paul's information for himself.
70	22	"This World...Then the Fireworks"	John L'Ecuyer	Peter Mitchell	April 29, 1999
Grant meets with a group of people he has not seen for a long time with the express purpose of crashing the market. A programmer friend of Grant's shows up at the firm with access codes to most of the major banks and trading floors in North America intending to crash the market by putting bonus trades through. They successfully run a test in Asian markets. Back at GRC, Niko notices inexplicable market activity later that day. Not disgruntled like the other hackers, Grant calls the police and slips out the back door when they raid the place. Marty is about to leave the floor permanently when Grant rushes in and tells everyone the truth about the market crash. Not wanting to miss the opportunity, Marty goes back to the trading floor. Marty turns 40. Showing signs of a midlife crisis, Marty meets with his chief Bay Street rival, returns the teddy bear he had stolen, asks for advice on aging and leaves the bill to his competitor. The traders realize they forgot Marty's birthday and decide to get him a present the following morning. Marty announces to Adam and Sally that he has decided to retire. When they respond that they need time to replace him, he recommends Niko. After receiving birthday wishes from the traders, Marty announces his retirement and his choice of Niko as a replacement. Chris becomes visibly upset at being passed over. Adam considers taking an offer to become CEO of Cancorp. He later accepts the position of Cancorp. CEO and is making a speech to their boardroom when he is stopped and told that the offer was not sincere. He is so humiliated that he sleeps at GRC. In an effort to help Adam recover, Paul hands him a letter. The letter Paul gave Adam is proof of a bribe to the government so Adam meets with the Cancorp. executive that arranged for his humiliation. The Cancorp. executive offers to pay for their silence but Adam has already called the police. Sally works to raise financing for an in vitro fertilization clinic doing research on an artificial womb. Niko is disturbed when she receives a message from a man from her past. In opposition to its product, Sally forces Ian to terminate his cigarette manufacturer deal. In opposition to the artificial womb, she also terminates the in vitro fertilization clinic deal and then signs on for a Third World betterment project. Catherine is pregnant. A man from Niko's past shows up and she leaves the floor immediately.
