= Patricia Marceau =

Canadian actress and director

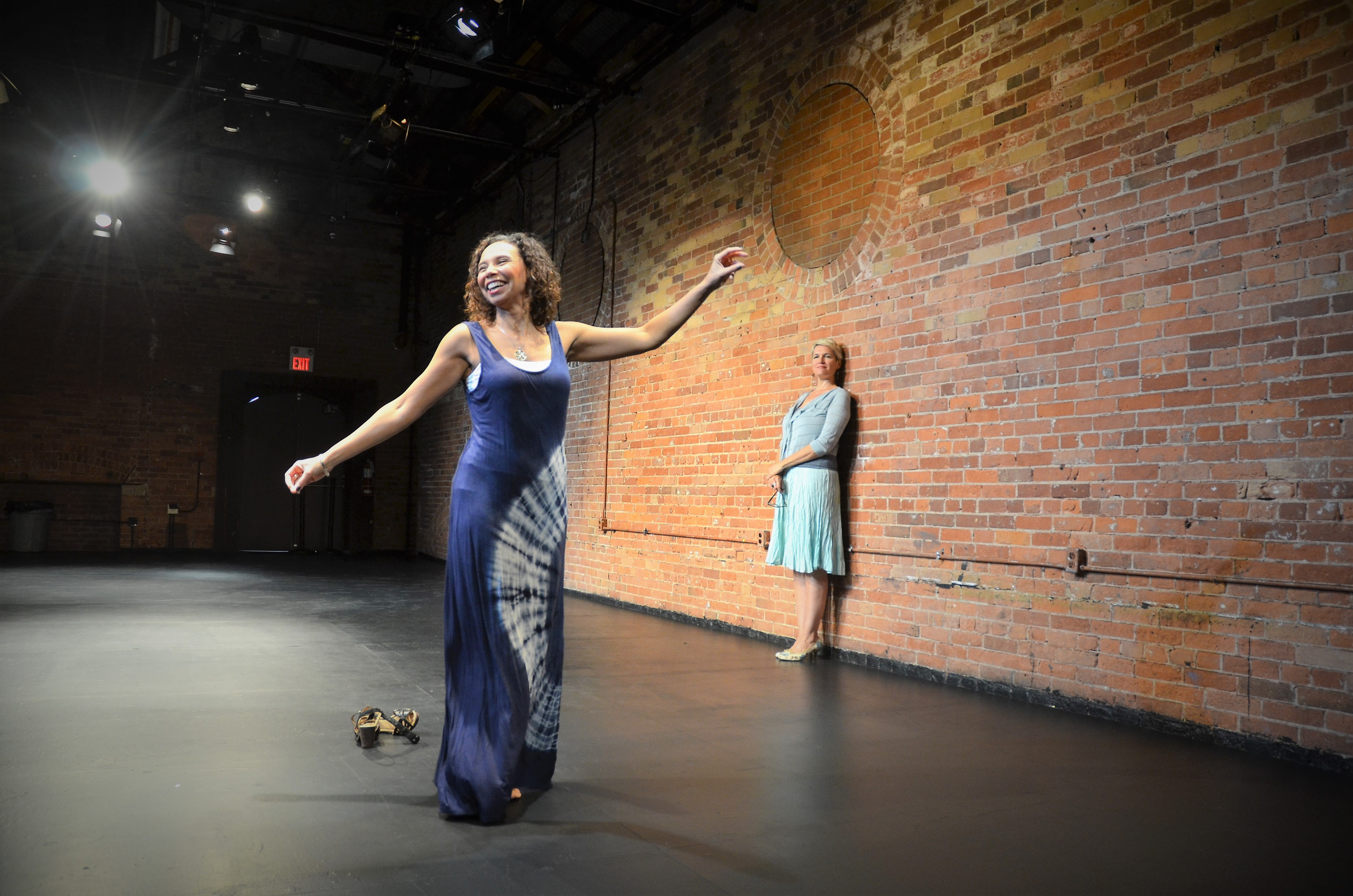
Patricia Marceau (right) and Karine Ricard in La Seconde Surprise de l'amour by Pierre de Marivaux

Patricia Marceau is a Canadian actress and director. Marceau has performed in theatre, voice-over, film, and television in both English and French in several Toronto-based productions including Pleiades Theatre, Théâtre français de Toronto and Theatre Smith-Gilmour, some of which took her across Canada, China, and Moscow. Originally from Montreal, she graduated from The Neighborhood Playhouse School of the Theatre in New York City.

== Selected Credits ==
=== Actress ===
- The Flood Thereafter (The Canadian Stage Company)
- Albertine en cinq temps (Théâtre La Catapulte/Théâtre français de Toronto)
- The Post Office (Pleiades Theatre)
- Des Fraises en Janvier (Théâtre français de Toronto)
- L'Avare (Théâtre français de Toronto)
- Portrait Chinois d'une imposteure (Théâtre français de Toronto)
- Le Visiteur (Théâtre français de Toronto)
- Heart of a Dog (Pleiades Theatre)
- Coeur de chien (Théâtre français de Toronto)
- Le Mariage forcé (Théâtre français de Toronto)
- La Critique de l'École des femmes (Théâtre français de Toronto)
- Apocalypse à Kamloops (Théâtre français de Toronto/La Catapulte)
- Chekhov's Shorts (Theatre-Smith Gimour)

=== Director ===
- Le Projet Ionesco (Créations VAD)
- Afghanistan (La Catapulte)
- Je serai là pour te tuer (Cassis Productions)
- I'll be always there to kill you (Cassis Productions)

=== Assistant Director ===
- À toi, pour toujours, ta Marie-Lou (Théâtre français de Toronto)

=== Film and television ===
- Météo+
- Flashpoint
- ReGenesis
- Mordu
- Wild Card
- Le Canada: Une historie populaire
- The Red Green Show
- Traders
