= Emmanuelle Zeesman =

- Born: Emmanuelle Zeesman; Montreal, Quebec, Canada
- Occupations: film, stage, television actress singer film director and choreographer

Emmanuelle Zeesman (born 20th century) is a Canadian actress in film, stage, and television, as well as a singer, musical director, and choreographer working primarily in the United States and Canada. She has also performed throughout Australia, Asia and Europe. Zeesman is also a pianist, a trumpet player, and tin whistler.

== Training ==
Zeesman graduated from the University of Windsor Musical Theatre Performance Program before becoming an instructor at the Ottawa School of Speech and Drama. In addition to her education at Windsor, Zeesman is a graduate of École Philippe Gaulier, and she has studied under leading Canadian acting, musical theatre, and choreography coaches.

== Performances ==
=== Movies and television ===
Zeesman played the role of Lou Anne in the short film "Mercy". Her credits also list her as performing in various film and television roles (acting, dancing, hosting), including A Lover's Revenge, First Comes Love, Getting Along Famously, Officier Croupier, and The Breakfast Club (for Rogers Cable and the New RO television, not the John Hughes film).

=== Theatre ===
Zeesman is a member of A Company of Fools Theatre Inc., a not-for-profit professional theatre company that presents Shakespeare plays in a format that employs editing, improvisation, costumes, make up, physical comedy, and local and contemporary references to appeal to broad audiences, including children and those uninitiated into Shakespeare's works.

Zeesman's theatrical performances are tabled below.

Theatrical performances
Performance	Role	Theatre (production)
Guys and Dolls	Mimi	National Arts Centre
I	The Writer	Gladstone Theatre (David Hersh)
Blood Brothers musical	Mrs. Johnstone	Gladstone Theatre
The Andrews Brothers	Peggy	Gladstone Theatre
Doubt	Sister James	Gladstone Theatre (John P. Kelly)
Romeo and Juliet	Juliet	A Company of Fools (Al Connors)
The Snow Show	Elizabeth	National Arts Centre (Jennifer Brewin)
The Gimquet (or, Found Her Song)	Gimquet	Platypus Theatre (Peter Duschenes)
La Vie Parisienne	Pauline	Theatre Lyrique (Steve Michaud)
Home	As Cast	STO Union (Nadia Ross)
Tempest in a Teapot	Miranda	A Company of Fools (Scott Florence)
Macbeth	Lady Macbeth	Salamander Theatre (Chris McLeod)
Twelfth Night	Olivia	A Company of Fools (Torchlight Shakespeare; Margo McDonald)
The Tales of Hoffmann	Spirite	Opera Lyra (Henri Akino)
Lunch	Mary	U of O Masters Series (Nathalie Quesnel)
Dans le creux de la vague	La Mer (Lead Vocalist)	Jeunesse en Tete (Anne-Marie Riel)
Amahl and the Night Visitors	Shepherdess	Detroit Symphony Orchestra (Diana-Mady Kelly)
Into the Woods	Rapunzel	Essex Theatre (David Savoy)
Romeo and Juliet	Capulet (Dancer)	Opera Lyra (Daniel Livingston)
The Secret Garden musical	Lily	Experimental Theatre (Melanie Walker)
Mother Courage	Ivette	Third Wall Theatre (James Richardson)
Samuel Beckett Shorts	Morvan	Late Night Series for Great Canadian Theatre Company (C. Roberts)
A Midwinter's Dream Tale	Titania	A Company of Fools (Al Connors)
A Midsummer Night's Dream	Hermia	A Company of Fools (Catriona Leger)
Forbidden Broadway	Julie Andrews	Experimental Theatre (S. Henrickson)
A World of Stories	Storyteller	Salamander Theatre (Eleanor Crowder)
Parliament Hill Players	Lady Dufferin	Government of Canada (Benoit Osborne)
Never Swim Alone	Referee	Vision Theatre (Greg Wizinski)
Chicago	Velma Kelly	Eddy May Mysteries (Riley Stewart)
Hairspray	Prudy Pingleton / Gym Teacher / Matron	Segerstrom Hall, Costa Mesa CA

== Awards ==
In 2010 the Capital Critics Circle (CCC) awarded her the title of Best Professional Actor for her role in Blood Brothers at the Gladstone Theatre. Alvina Ruprecht of the CCC, and resident theatrical critic of the Canadian Broadcasting Corporation, describes Zeesman's performance as "absolutely magnificent as Mrs Johnstone, the worried, harassed debt ridden mother who can't pay, can't control her oldest boys ... Zeesman's singing brings great depth to all these emotional situations. As well as being a strong singer she has also become a serious actress. The final number, 'Tell me it's not true', as she bends over the two bodies of her dead sons, was the culmination of a great performance".
