= Traders season 5 =

Traders
- Season 5
- No. of episodes: 13

Release
- Original network: Global Television Network
- Original release: December 2, 1999 – March 9, 2000

Season chronology
- ← Previous; Season 4

This is a list of episodes for Traders a Canadian television drama series, which was broadcast on Global Television Network from 1996 to 2000. The show was set in a Bay Street investment bank, Gardner Ross. Bruce Gray and Sonja Smits starred as the firm's senior partners, Adam Cunningham and Sally Ross. The cast also included Patrick McKenna, David Cubitt, Rick Roberts, Chris Leavins, Gabriel Hogan, David Hewlett, Peter Stebbings and Alex Carter.

== Episodes ==
No. overall	No. in season	Title	Directed by	Written by	Original release date
71	1	"Episode One"	Gary Harvey	Peter Mitchell	December 2, 1999
The season begins with Adam having a nightmare about being old while sleeping in the waiting room of a hospital before he is woken by a hospital employee. He soon goes to the room where Catherine is with his newborn son. At the morning meeting, after all bankers are having difficulty landing and keeping deals, Sally laments having stolen deals from Cancorp. Adam arrives late and announces the birth of his son, Matthew. Marty distributes copies of a book he has written to all members of his firm. Disappointed when his book doesn't sell any copies on its first day, he goes to the bookstore and replaces books on an end display with his book. The next day, Marty calls his publisher to angrily voice his discontent with their efforts to promote his book. Marty thinks 200 copies of his book have been sold but soon learns that Grant bought them to make him feel better. After learning of Marty's troubles selling his book, Adam calls a friend at his publishing company for greater promotion priority. Grant decides to move from his closet to the trading floor. Ziggy and new trader named Mike Pinetti show up together. Later, Mike confesses to Niko and Ziggy that he spent 2 years in jail for aggravated assault after beating a man who raped his sister and that he currently lives with his mother. Chris is now an analyst in the firm, junior to the investment bankers. Paul gets Sally to reassign Chris to him. Justine asks Sally for more capital for her small business division. Sally agrees to 2/3 of the capital she requested. Sally travels to Chicago hoping to scare up capital from venture capital firms. In Chicago, she is rejected by several venture capital firms before meets with a quirky venture capitalist named Ben Sullivan of Epona Capital, who seems open to a partnership. She decides to stay in Chicago overnight. Ben agrees to invest in one of the four companies Sally pitches. She calls Ian to Chicago with the CEO of the company to present further details. After presenting to a group of high-net-worth American investors, Sally raises more money than needed for the telecommunications technology startup. Adam proposes a joint venture with another investment bank but, fearing Cancorp's response, the other firm refuses. Due to pressure from Cancorp., GRC is having a difficult time landing deals. Tired, Adam and Catherine decide to hire a helper for Matthew and Adam becomes a more involved father.
72	2	"Career Opportunities"	TW Peacocke	Shelley Eriksen	December 9, 1999
An old friend of Adam's approaches him to raise money for his petroleum company. Ian and Sally lose another deal to Cancorp. prompting Sally to press Adam to make amends with them. As a peace offering, Adam invites Cancorp. to act as co-lead on his friend's petroleum company financing. His Cancorp. rival counters by suggesting that he steer his friend's company toward a convertible bond offering for the benefit of one of Cancorp's clients but Adam initially refuses. Adam knows that a convertible bond offering could cause one of Cancorp's clients to gain control of his friend's petroleum company. Doing so would not be in his best interest but would be in GRC's. His friend is skeptical of the convertible issue but, out of trust, decides to go along with Adam. Adam's petroleum producer friend is irate after his common stock drops by $2/share in one day. After learning that a hedge fund has bought 24% of his company, Adam's petroleum producer friend realizes Adam has laid him out to appease Cancorp. Marty neglects his floor duties to promote his book. Distracted by his book, the trading floor's yearly profit suffers and so does Marty's bonus. A woman who has just quit her job to trade at home full-time approaches Marty on the trading floor for an autograph. At a book signing later, Marty meets a creep named Darren who idolizes him. Ziggy is upset at receiving a meager bonus after a poor performance review with Sally and starts looking for another job. Paul joins a Christian business group. At Paul's first meeting, he relates how he had sex with a client to land a deal as his ethical dilemma but neglects to mentions it was a homosexual encounter. Having had a difficult year after being pulled from the mutual fund, Ian does not receive a bonus but decides to stay with the firm anyway.
73	3	"Getting Lucky"	TW Peacocke	Jennifer Cowan	December 16, 1999
The other traders are annoyed with Marty's hubris. At a charity casino, Marty meets rival traders who also think his book popularity is making him arrogant. One of them offhandedly mentions a deal to Marty. One of the rival traders later gives Marty a further hint about a deal. The following morning, against the advice of the other traders, Marty begins to act on it. The company that Marty is making a play on is halted. Marty leaves in the middle of a radio interview when he learns that the company he received a tip on is in trouble with the police and rushes back to the trading floor hoping to minimize the damage. When he sees the traders who played him, Marty is even more arrogant. Catherine is gets bored with her homemaker lifestyle and decides to return to Alberta. After a discussion, Catherine decides to leave Matthew in Toronto with Adam. The firm decides to sell off its retail arm. Adam orders Chris and Paul to reprice the retail arm at a price 33% higher than their valuation. He later changes his mind and decides to go with Chris's valuation of their retail division. Justine gets Sally interested in cardboard temporary homeless shelters but their idea is rebuffed by a civil servant. Sally asks an anti-poverty activist with a history of using unorthodox methods to make public protests to help bring the government around to approving the cardboard temporary homeless shelters for use. Embarrassed by the anti-poverty activist, the bureaucrat that originally rejected Sally's cardboard homeless shelter idea agrees to buy 750 boxes if she can stop the activist from generating any more negative publicity for her ministry. Not being an experienced player, Grant loses at blackjack at a charity casino. He later goes to the casino after hours and pays the blackjack dealer to help him practice for a few hours. After winning consistently, Grant feels validated that he is smart enough to play blackjack. Sally proposes a merger between GRC and the American venture capitalist.
74	4	"Solitary Consignment"	Gary Harvey	Graham Clegg	December 30, 1999
While volunteering as a prison counselor with the Christian business group, Paul is assigned to a child killer who has designed and patented a unique GPS device to track children but need help bringing it to market. He wants any profits directed to his grandchildren and children's charities. GRC agrees to do the child tracker deal on the condition that the killer's name not be associated with it but the child killer is insistent that his name be included on the child tracking device. After the child killer fails at a suicide attempt, Sally and Paul convince him to allow the project to proceed without his name on it. While trying to sell a manufacturing plant, Ian is approached by a concerned union leader named Wayne. Later, after the factory buyer bails, the union decides to make a bid for it. Adam refuses the $4M Ian's needs to help Wayne's union buy out the factory. Darren, one of Marty's fans sets up a web site for him that includes unauthorized public shots of Marty. Darren later shows up on the floor to ask Marty for a job. Marty shoos him away but notices him taking pictures of Marty before leaving. Later on, Marty gets very upset when Darren, his stalker fan, shows up at his house one evening. Much to the consternation of her colleagues, Ziggy joins a narcotics using group of traders from another firm for drinks. Hoping to land a job with another firm, she stays out all night and starts doing cocaine with them. Ian confronts the other bankers when he learns that the child killer's deal was passed but his union buyout was not. Marty receives an email in which Darren promises not to stalk him. The episode ends with the firm receiving a visit from correctional services Canada representatives. Any intellectual property created by prisoners legally belongs to the federal government.
75	5	"Budding Prospects"	Richard J. Lewis	Peter Mitchell	January 12, 2000
The episode begins with Paul ridiculing Ian for his union auto plant buyback efforts. GRC formally signs a joint venture agreement with Epona Capital. Grant plays blackjack online. Ian tries to sell Ben on the plant buyback proposal but Adam suggests he find something else for the plant to manufacture. Wayne, the plant union leader, rejects Ian's idea to use the plant for electric vehicle manufacturing. Ian arranges another meeting with Wayne over the electric car idea and convinces him to consider it, pointing out that when electric cars take off, as owners of the factory, his workers will see financial benefits far beyond their union wage. Wayne agrees to give the idea some consideration. Later, Ian's environmentalist client proposes they retrofit the plant to make it more environmentally friendly and sell their emissions to companies exceeding their pollution allowance. In the end, Wayne agrees to the electric car manufacturing deal. Ben pitches an American medical marijuana company to the executive committee. After meeting with the American marijuana grower who has brought along some samples of his product, Sally and Adam consider getting involved with the deal. Sally and Ben meet with a bureaucrat who outrightly refuses to consider conducting clinical trials on medical marijuana from an American firm. When Sally learns that all Canadian applicants for medical marijuana clinical trials have criminal records or are inexperience in marijuana growing, she convinces the same bureaucrat who rejected them to promise due consideration since Ben's American grower is a botanist without a criminal record. At the end of the episode, Ben and Sally smoke marijuana on the roof of the building together. While complaining to him about not being able to do his own deals, Chris notices Adam with a popular out of print children's book from a series he read as a child. To help Chris, Grant uses the Internet to find out that rights to the children's book series have reverted to the author who has refused attempts by publishers to acquire the rights. Chris finds the reclusive author of the children's book series but quickly learns she has no interest in publishing the series. The reclusive author only becomes interested in republishing her book series after Chris explains that she can get $10M upfront if they issue a bond against the rights to her book. On the floor, the children's book bond issue sells out briskly but during her speech in front of the press, they children's book author announces her plans to donate the lion's share of her proceeds from the bond issue to various white supremacist groups causing the Jewish publisher to pull out of the deal immediately. Since GRC will take a financial hit if the books are not published, Chris offers to allow the publisher out of the deal or face litigation. The publisher agrees to tear up the contract and Chris finds another publisher for the children's books.
76	6	"It's a Family Affair"	TW Peacocke	Shelley Eriksen	January 20, 2000
The father of Niko's son, who she has no contact with, approaches her to ask for money. He apparently works for another Bay Street firm and has taken $2M from client accounts to bet on a stock that failed. While she does not have the money to help him, he knows that she might be able to get insider information so he can make a trade that might profit him enough to replace the money he embezzled. To help the father of her son, Niko asks Paul for advance information on an upcoming merger that her son's father can profit from. She explains that if her son's father goes to jail, she will become a mother. On his way to work one morning, Paul drops off information about an upcoming merger at Niko's condo but after hearing her son's voice on the phone, Niko decides not to use the inside information Paul has given her to help her son's father out of trouble. Instead of giving him the inside information when she meets with him, Niko encourages her son's father to turn himself in and serve time in jail rather than risk having both of them go to jail if he gets caught using the insider information she was supposed to give him. She offers to take care of her son while he is in jail but he refuses to turn himself in. Adam engages a family-owned media company client who is estranged from her brother. Adam meets with the estranged brother who states that he is not averse to a merger between his media company and his sister's but explains that she may not accept his over-the-top programming. Later, Adam's client claims that it is not the programming on her brother's radio station she objects to. She doesn't want a merger because she expects to be at odds with her brother over programming issues. In order to create a common enemy for the feuding brother and sister, Adam and Sally get a rival media company owner to feign interest in taking over radio stations. In an effort to head off a hostile takeover, the feuding brother and sister agree to a takeover. Marty assigns Niko to the role of head trader while is away for a book sellers convention. At the convention, Marty is approached by a flirtatious infomercial producer who thinks his book could be well marketed in an infomercial. After an evening of dancing together, the infomercial producer almost seduces Marty but he breaks it off before they have sex. Despite that, she still wants to do the infomercial. After an argument with his wife later, Marty goes straight to the infomercial producer's hotel room hoping to resume their tryst only to find that her husband has flown into town to surprise her. Wayne, the union leader, understands that they will have to break up the union and make concessions to keep their manufacturing jobs but anticipates difficulty convincing the other members. Ian has to decertify Wayne's union to make the electric vehicle deal fly. At a union softball game, he tries to sell the union members on the merits of the deal. When Ian and Wayne meet with the union boss, Ian suspects that he will try to take some action against them at a later stage. Expecting to be reunited with her son, Niko is joyful but when she appears at the park where they are supposed to meet, the boy and his father do not show up. Instead, the babysitter arrives to tell her that they won't be there. The episode ends with Niko attending to Grant like a mother would to a son after hitting him in the eye with a baby toy she threw at him.
77	7	"Scents and Sensibilities"	Scott Smith (director)	Alyson Feltes	January 27, 2000
The episode begins with Ziggy and the traders she parties with at a house the morning after a party. Brick mentions to her that there is a shake-up on the trading floor of his firm so they will be looking for new traders and offers to put in a good word for her. Sally meets with a former university contact of hers. During their conversation, he complains of how budget shortfalls are forcing the university to consider partnerships with industry firms such as pharmaceutical companies. Sally offers to donate $20M from GRC to help but warns that there will also be strings attached. More comfortable with a former colleague than an unfamiliar corporation, he is interested in her offer. Sally suggests to Adam that they offer the university a $20M endowment in exchange for a first pass on any of its projects. Adam suggests $10M and the right to choose which projects to fund and to what extent. The executive committee finds 6 university research projects they want to invest in. Sally's university contact introduces a professor doing research in an area with no practical application. Just after Paul promises a professor $2.5M for a drug testing project, Sally informs him that since she has allocated $1M to the project with no practical application, only $1.5M will be available for drug testing. Instead of telling the professor they can only allocate $1.5M, Paul instructs him to ask for Sally when he visits the firm. When the drug testing project professor arrives at the firm, he complains to Sally that raising another $1M will delay the product's market entry. Adam, who was also under the understanding that drug testing would receive $2.5M also gets angry that Sally changed the allocation amount they had agreed on at the board meeting. When she explains how she diverted $1M to another project with no commercial value, he gets angrier. During dinner, Sally explains to her boyfriend that she decided to allocation $1M to a pie in the sky project because it was meaningful to her. They also decide that they will not move in together. On the trading floor, Niko, Ziggy and Marty notice Grant's body odor but for fear of hurting him, nobody wants to tell him. While they are trying to decide who will tell Grant, Mike shows up and immediately suggests that he take a shower. Grant explains that he has been working so hard on Marty's CD-ROM that he has forgotten to change and shower and immediately leaves the floor to clean himself up. When the other traders learn that Grant is working on Marty's CD-ROM for free, Niko and Niko negotiate a compensation arrangement for him. The CD-ROM Grant has developed for Marty is too complex for the average person to understand. While having lunch together, Marty and the infomercial producer discuss another possible tryst. Ziggy is excited about an engagement party she has been invited to. At the engagement party, the groom-to-be flirts with Ziggy. Goaded on by one of her friends, Ziggy sleeps with the groom at his engagement party. M.J., Ben Sullivan's daughter arrives at the firm from the U.S. and immediately hits it off with Paul. He allows M.J. to put up the other $1M for the drug testing company but wanting to keep Canadian technology in Canada, Sally is enraged when she learns that Paul and M.J. went behind her back to an American financier. When Adam walks in on the argument, he agrees with Paul and M.J.'s determination to help the drug testing product to market faster than its competitors but frowns on them resorting to subterfuge to achieve their ends. In private, Sally later admits to Ian that she screwed up on the drug testing deal, saying she thinks Paul did the right thing the wrong way. After Grant and Marty finish the CD-ROM over the weekend, they show it to the infomercial producer and she loves it. Noticing the flirtation between Marty and the infomercial producer, grant asks point blank if he plans to sleep with her. Marty later blames Grant's remarks for not having slept with the infomercial producer. The traders buy Grant a Palm Pilot to help him remember things and keep organized. Offended and preferring to keep things in his head, he returns it to them then launching into a tirade about an impending market crash leading the other traders to raise doubts about his mental stability. Dunnage Motors receives orders for its electric cars from municipal governments.
78	8	"Hawks"	Michael DeCarlo	Peter Mitchell	February 3, 2000
The episode begins with Ben and Sally waiting on a contact of Ben's interested in buying an International Hockey League franchise with the intent of moving it to Texas. While waiting, Sally mentions that she broke up with her boyfriend. The owner of the IHL hockey team gets cold feet due to media and community pressure against selling the team to an American owner. He also fears that his auto dealerships might be boycotted. The IHL transaction leaves GRC in a dilemma. If they facilitate the sale to an American buyer, there may be a backlash in Canada but if they are unable to do the deal, they may lose out on future business with the American buyer. The IHL team owner accepts an offer from Ben and Sally's American client that is $2M higher than the offer from the consortium of local businessmen. When confronted by hockey fans protesting the sale of the hockey team to an American bidder, Sally points out that during home games, stands are often empty and the American buyer can give the team more stability than the local consortium. Adam and Sally allow Marty to use the firm's trading floor for an infomercial. Barb is present during the filming of his infomercial at GRC offices. While filming, Vanessa and Marty's mutual flirtation is so obvious that Paul's child prodigy inventor prospect even notices. After the shooting, Barb confronts Marty, asking him point-blank if he has been having sex with Vanessa. After Adam and Sally watch the infomercial, they insist that all references to GRC be cut out. Marty arranges to meet Vanessa at her hotel the day after the first airing of his infomercial but after it bombs, Vanessa shows up at the firm to tell Marty that its broadcasting has been ordered halted and she cannot meet with him for their planned tryst because she is leaving town early and is no longer interested in him. They share a passionate kiss before she leaves. Concerned over his mental state, Marty requires that all of Grant's trades be approved. Grant is soon annoyed that his trades must be approved by Marty. After a call option play does not go as he expected, Grant suspects he has medical problems. Paul attempts to woo a thirteen-year-old girl who has invented an effective nutritional supplement. Since the child prodigy nutritional supplement inventor is being wooed by other bankers, Paul takes her out in an attempt to gain her trust and make her more likely to choose him. On their second outing together, Paul better connects with the 13-year-old who chooses him to handle her project. Paul notices a typo in the contract drawn up by the 13-year-old inventor's mother's law student boyfriend that causes the rights for the nutritional supplement to revert to GRC and not the girl and her family as intended. The girl's mother's boyfriend tried to trick GRC by regaining ownership of the product rights after GRC had invested R & D money into the project but the typo does the exact opposite so Paul signs the contract. Later, when the prodigy who claims she knew nothing of the clause confronts him, he is unrepentant. Ziggy's party hard lifestyle is taking a toll on her work performance. At a bar, Tonya, a woman who had previously approached Marty for a book autograph makes advances toward Marty while asking for trading advice but he rudely blows her off. When he reaches his car later, he finds that someone has thrown a large rock through the window and left a copy of his book on the seat Ben and Sally become intimate.
79	9	"The Running of the Bulls"	Reid Dunlop	Graham Clegg	February 10, 2000
At a bar, Ian runs into some friends from his university days. One of them is lead on a hot technology offering. He suggests to Ian that there might be room for a co-lead. When Ian tells Adam and Sally about it, they are skeptical but Adam suggest that he accompany Ian to the meeting. Ian assigns Chris to research the technology and the key players involved in it. When Ian shows up to the meeting, he quickly learns that his university buddy picked a co-lead that morning. They learn that the third in command selling group role must still be filled and Ian's friend intends to choose the role with a card game. Adam agrees. At the card game, after two of the bankers bow out, the one remaining non-GRC banker offers Adam and Ian a deal if they bow out but they refuse. Ian soon bows out before Adam wins third place. Back at the offices, Ian is ready to lead the selling group but Adam still wants to angle his way into the co-lead position. Chris learns that the co-lead has health problems and the software CEO collects guns. Sally calls Ben to find a merger partner for a Canadian wireless company and he delegates the task to M.J. Sally and M.J. are unable to agree on a suitable candidate for the Canadian wireless company. Sally and M.J. agree on a merger partner for the Canadian wireless company. During a meeting with CEOs of the two companies, Sally is surprised to learn that M.J. only put her own name on the board of directors of the merged entity and not Sally's. In response, Sally tries to talk the CEO of the wireless company out of the merger but he refuses. Chris leaks the microprocessor company secondary issue information to Marty who promptly acts on it. Later, the software company hits the restricted list while the trading floor is still accumulating it. Thinking he is gravely ill, Grant decides to have a CAT scan done. Grant's CAT scan results indicate that he is fine but he thinks he has a tumor. Wayne and Denise Laplante feel that Ian is neglecting Dunnage Motors. Adam meets with the software company CEO hoping to gain co-lead position but the meeting does not go well. The CEO gets offended when Adam suggests the current co-lead has Narcolepsy and might not be fit to co-lead before outrightly refusing Adam's suggestion that GRC co-lead. He they refuses the vintage rifle Adam has brought, explaining that he stopped collecting rifles after his cousin was killed in a hunting accident. Still determined to gain co-lead, Adam tells Ian and Chris to find someone who can gain advance notice on what the share price will be for the secondary offering. In response, Ian makes a deal with one of the bankers who lost third place giving him 100,000 options in the company at 25% below market rate plus a rabbit delivered to his apartment every month in exchange for advance notice on the secondary price. They receive notice on the planned offering price for the stock but knowing that the higher the secondary offering is priced, the less the smaller houses will be able to afford and the more GRC will be able to take, Adam asks Marty to spread rumors on the company in order to boost its stock price and force the smaller brokerages to take a smaller share of the offering. Marty agrees to do it in exchange for an unspecified favor. The lead banker for the software deal soon approaches Adam and orders him to get Marty to stop spreading rumors or lose their place in the deal. Adam complies. When Adam needs more cash for his and Ian's software company offering, hoping to teach M.J. a lesson, Sally decides to help him by pulling the bridge loan to the wireless company and dissolving her partnership with M.J. She also agrees to give Adam and Ian's software company co-lead advance notice on the wireless merger as a peacemaker gift. In advance of Adam and Ian's meeting, Chris plants a cellphone in the washroom of the lead bank. When Adam and Ian meet to bid on GRC's share of the software company, there is a long delay before the lead arrives. When he arrives, Ian immediately goes to the bathroom to use the cell phone that Chris had hidden in there to check the trading price before the bidding begins. Adam asks for 25% of the secondary offering. The co-lead also wants 25% but, at the price of the previous day's market close, cannot afford to take it. His narcolepsy kicks in and he soon falls asleep during the meeting. Since the co-lead cannot afford the 25% and has fallen asleep so cannot argue, GRC becomes co-lead. Ben flies in from Chicago to mediate between Sally and M.J. Sally admits scuttling the deal was a vindictive move. After M.J. leaves, Ben sides with Sally and tells her he would have done exactly the same thing. The episode ends with Ian meeting with Wayne and Denise, who he has been neglecting for the whole episode.
80	10	"Someone to Watch Over Me"	Philip Earnshaw	Jennifer Cowan	February 17, 2000
Someone from the surveillance department of the Toronto Stock Exchange shows up at GRC intent on meeting with Marty and Grant. Sally agrees to lend Grant to the TSE to test their new trading system but Grant is reluctant to go and when he refuses, the TSE representative hints at reopening the investigation into the tech stock crash he was involved with from the previous year. Ziggy hints at her plans to leave when Marty offers her a temporary promotion while Grant is gonebut gets upset when she learns that Brick helped Tory get a senior floor position at his firm. While they are out, Brick runs over a homeless man on the sidewalk. Ziggy wants to stay on the scene to help him but the others pull her away. Later, they report the accident from a phone booth near Ziggy's apartment. Upset about the accident the previous night, Ziggy is late for work and out of sorts the following morning. In an attempt to get out a date with someone his mother has fixed him up with, Mike asks Ziggy to accompany him to a wedding. After her inattentiveness to her job causes trading losses, Ziggy's behavior starts to concern Marty. The trading room computers all freeze at the same time due to technical problems at the stock exchange so Marty allows everyone to take the remainder of the day off. When Ziggy meets with Brick and the others, they decide not to report their involvement in the hit and run to avoid being charged with manslaughter. The other three traders decide to keep the accident a secret. Still concerned about Ziggy, Marty asks Mike if he knows why her recent behavior has been so strange. Brick shows up at GRC to offer Ziggy the job she has been asking him for the past month but she refuses his offer. Before they part, he tells her that he made a $50,000 donation to a homeless shelter. When the very beautiful woman that Mike's mother tried to fix him up with appears at GRC wanting to know if they will be attending the wedding together, Mike says no. Seeing this, Ziggy agrees to go with him. Adam is offered a job by Charles, a client of his, and later agrees to act as a consultant on a high-speed rail project. Niko meets with a private investigator hired by her ex-husband's firm to provide as much help as she can for them to find him. On receiving news that her son was found, Niko quickly leaves the trading floor. Later, Niko's first meeting with her son doesn't go well. When Grant returns from the stock exchange early, Marty suspects he is responsible for the exchange crash from the previous day. During lunch with another banker, Sally and Adam learn that the market crash was caused by Grant. Sally meets with Marty, expresses doubts about Grant's mental capacity and orders him to let Grant go immediately but the first time Marty approaches him, he cannot bring himself to fire Grant. When she sees Grant on the trading floor the following morning, Sally insists Marty fire Grant immediately. After negotiating, they decide to give him a leave of absence. Marty is so upset about having asked Grant to leave that he doesn't even yell when Ziggy tells him she lost $100,000. When Sally visits Grant at his apartment to tell him that there is a place for him at GRC when he feels better, Grant responds that he doesn't intend to return. He also rejects the number of a psychiatrist she tries to give him.
81	11	"Money Shot"	E. Jane Thompson	Peter Mitchell	February 24, 2000
Sally meets with a former university professor colleague who asks her to take her pornography company public and chooses Paul to help her with the IPO. During their lunch meeting, Sally warns her pornographer friend that going public will mean that shareholders will want a say in the company's operations. During their lunch, Sally learns that her friend has appeared in films after a man in the restaurant stares at her. Meanwhile, Paul visits the porn studio to meet with Fiona's partner, to learn about the business. He returns to Sally impressed with the porn company's prospects and tells her they can finance it any way she wants. Sally visits the porn studio herself to recommend a public offering as the best way to raise financing. While there, she discusses remuneration and working conditions for the porn actresses with her friend. Back at GRC later, Sally becomes disturbed after viewing a rape scene in one of the porn films. When Sally goes to Adam for advice on what to do about the porn issue, Adam suggest she use her position to reshape the company. Later during a meeting with Fiona and her partner, Sally announces that she will increase the share price by $0.50 with the extra capital raised going to a health and education fund for the porn stars. She also insists that any business that the company conducts in any foreign countries strictly adhere to Canadian labor laws. Fiona's partner initially tries to terminate the deal with GRC but Sally threatens to have every government agency investigate them if they do. Fiona agrees to Sally's conditions. At Dunnage Motors, since financing is contingent on successfully delivering the first order and the plant is seemingly behind its production schedule, Ian is concerned about them not being able to fill the first order. Later, Wayne asks Ian for money to hire more men to finish the first car order on time. At a Dunnage party to celebrate completion of their first order on time, Ian and Denise dance and become intimate in one of the cars. On the morning when the first order of Dunnage cars are about to ship, the drivers hired to ship the cars, who are members of Wayne's former union, refuse to cross the picket line. The union has also banded with a union of municipal workers to strike if their government takes delivery of any of the vehicles. When Ian calls the municipal controller to explain the delay, he learns that the deadline will not be extended. In order to reward him for his success, Sally and Adam offer Chris a 2 week vacation and airplane tickets to anywhere. While Chris is trying to decide where to go, Paul suggests that Adam cashed in some air miles to avoid giving him a raise. Later, Chris learns that his father has died. His response is uncaring. He soon decides against taking a vacation and meets with Adam to request more work. Chris misses his father's funeral to facilitate a deal between two biotechnology firms. Chris later rejects a card from the floor traders. Adam gets the federal government to agree to a $250M investment in the high-speed rail project. They then plan to get agreements from the provincial governments. Impressed, Charles Fosset asks Adam to join his company full-time. During drinks with Marty, Chris expresses his regret about not attending his father's funeral. He also expresses discontent with his job and life in general. When Chris tells him that his life is better, Marty shares that his marriage is close to divorce. Wayne receives a call from a Japanese company planning to launch a line of electric vehicles that is interested in buying the factory, getting the workers back in the union and moving into production within a year. He asks for Ian's help. Ian is a bit disappointed that the EV company will not be Canadian. The episode ends with one of the porn stars approaching Sally on the street to thank her for getting better working conditions.
82	12	"The One You Bury"	Scott Smith (director)	Shelley Eriksen	March 2, 2000
While making out in the back of a taxi, Sally asks Ben to marry her. At the morning meeting later, Sally announces that she married Ben to the stunned executive committee. Before the bank opens, Adam tries to sell a potential investor in the high-speed railway venture at his GRC office. In the underground parking area, Marty is approached by Darren, the fan of his book that used to stalk him. Darren has lost his money trading and is now head of security for the parking lot. Fearing for his safety, Marty wants Darren fired. In the parking lot, Marty is accosted by Darren. Marty apologizes for the losses Darren has suffered but Darren is not placated. Marty soon calls the building manager and tries to get Darren fired. Sally and Chris meet with two young women trying to make a business out of selling video games for girls. Taking notice of the competence Chris shows on the video games for girls software company, Sally makes him the co-lead on the deal. After hearing of Sally's marriage, Adam decides to join the high-speed rail company full-time. Niko's son bites his teacher. In the elevator, Chris offers to help Niko out with her son. At home, Grant tries to download his personality to a powerful computer. When Marty visits, Grant does not allow him inside of the apartment. Grant later finishes downloading his personality to the computer and begins testing it. Ziggy cries when Marty lays into her for her trading performance for the month. Mike intervenes and takes her away from the trading floor. Later, during dinner at Mike's family's house, Ziggy leaves the table upset after spilling a drink on the table. When Mike follows her outside, she tells him about the hit and run. With help from some of Mike's friends, Ziggy submits a statement to the police regarding the hit and run. After an argument on the floor, Marty and Mike nearly come to physical blows. When Marty rises quickly, Niko get frightened and hits him. Hoping to give himself a stronger case to the building management to fire Darren, Marty takes a golf club and uses it to smash the window of his vehicle. When Ian learns that the biotechnology company him and Paul are working with have developed a strain of Anthrax that there is currently no antidote for, he tells Paul who has no scruples about dealing with a company that could be manufacturing a biological weapon. At lunch, Adam tries to tell Sally that he is leaving by telling her the consulting and banking is too heavy a workload. Thinking that he means he will drop the consulting, she responds by telling him that, much to his surprise, she plans to leave GRC to move to Chicago. Overjoy at finally becoming the head of GRC, he congratulates her again on her marriage. She later announces her leave of absence to the executive committee. While doing so, Paul, who is in close contact with M.J., arrives late with a going away present. With Sally gone, it leaves Paul as second in command at GRC and M.J. as acting director at Epona. When Grant asks the computer with his downloaded computer personality how it is today, the computer responds by saying it is alone. The building management calls Marty to report that Darren has been fired after his car was broken into. When Niko's son bites him while he is reading a story, Chris bites him back. The two of them show signs of bonding. Before leaving for her honeymoon, as a last dig against Adam, Sally uses her shoe to remove the letters h, a, and m from the firm's logo at the entrance, making it Gardner, Ross, Cunning. At the end, Mike, Marty and Ziggy break into Grant's apartment to find him collapsed on the floor.
83	13	"Nice Guys Finish Last"	Peter Mitchell	Peter Mitchell	March 9, 2000
The episode begins with an exchange between Marty and his wife indicating that their future of their marriage is uncertain. Ben and Sally are enjoying life together on Ben's ranch. During a board meeting, Ian announces that GRC's Dunnage Motors investment will be recouped with the sale to a Japanese firm. Adam responds that the bank will not dole out rewards for projects that only break even. After receiving an offer from Denise, Ian decides to leave GRC to become the CFO for Dunnage. After the board meeting, Marty asks Adam for permission to offer Grant, who has already accepted his severance package, his old job back. In a session with a psychiatrist, it is revealed that Grant has a borderline personality disorder prone to fits of rage and moments of delusion. When on an anti-psychotic drug, Grant begins to feel normal so the psychiatrist offers him a prescription to the drug. While checking out Sally's office as the place for an office of her own, M.J. discovers that Adam has been using it as a room for Matthew. He states that, until he decides who is worthy of the office, Sally's old office is Matthew's room. Marty receives a disturbing gift-wrapped effigy of himself. Alan Greenspan makes an announcement that causes a large unexpected downward move in the market but Marty refuses to unload positions at a loss when they are down 10%. The corporate finance staff, including Sally who is at Ben's ranch, all work frantically to provide reassurances their clients in the face of the market panic. Grant returns to the firm to help out. Marty works himself up to the point where he collapses on the trading floor. Adam gets a visit from an investigator who warns that knowingly selling biological weapons is punishable by imprisonment. When interrogated, Paul denies knowing that the biotechnology company he financed was making biological weapons. When asked if Ian might have known, he states that he doubts Ian would knowingly involve himself in a biological weapons deal but raises the investigator's suspicions by hinting that Ian will be leaving the firm soon. The investigator advises that Ian find a good lawyer and takes him to the police station for questioning. After markets close, Marty stays on the floor. Grant offers to watch Asian markets for him but he urges Grant to go home before confiding that his wife has left him. The following day, the firm's losses rise to $29M. Niko invites Chris to spend the evening with her and her son, implying their relationship will start again. Mike tells Marty that the police picked up Darren for shoplifting. Knowing of Sally's feelings toward Ian and will fly back to Toronto to help him, Adam does not mention that he is being held by the police. Soon after making bail, Ian returns to the firm and quickly confronts Paul, physically assaulting him. Adam rushes into the office, pulls Ian away from Paul and assures him that GRC's lawyers will get Ian out of trouble. After the trading day has finished, while waiting outside Grant allows a disguised Tonya into the building. She finds her way to the trading floor where Marty is and begins by expressing her sorrow for Marty's presumably bad trading day and apologizing for yelling at him when they last met. As she begins to cry, he comforts her with a hug. While holder her, she pulls a knife out of her purse and stabs him in the back. As Grant and Ziggy are exiting the elevator to the trading floor, she rushes past them into the elevator. When they arrive at the trading floor, they find Marty in a pool of blood. While Marty is at the hospital in critical condition, Adam makes Niko the head trader. We learn that Tonya killed herself soon after. When M.J. informs Niko that she has recommended her to replace Marty as head trader if he cannot return to work, M.J. threatens to beat her. Niko then sends Ziggy out to find Grant who blames himself for letting Tonya in. When Ziggy finds him at the hospital, she tell him to stop blaming himself and encourages him to start taking his medication again. With a young child, Niko declines the head trader position. Sally returns to Ben's ranch. In Marty's hospital room, Barb tells him they need to finish their fight. He responds by saying that he is finished. It is uncertain whether he survives the stabbing or not.
