= Gladstone Avenue =

Street in Ottawa, Canada

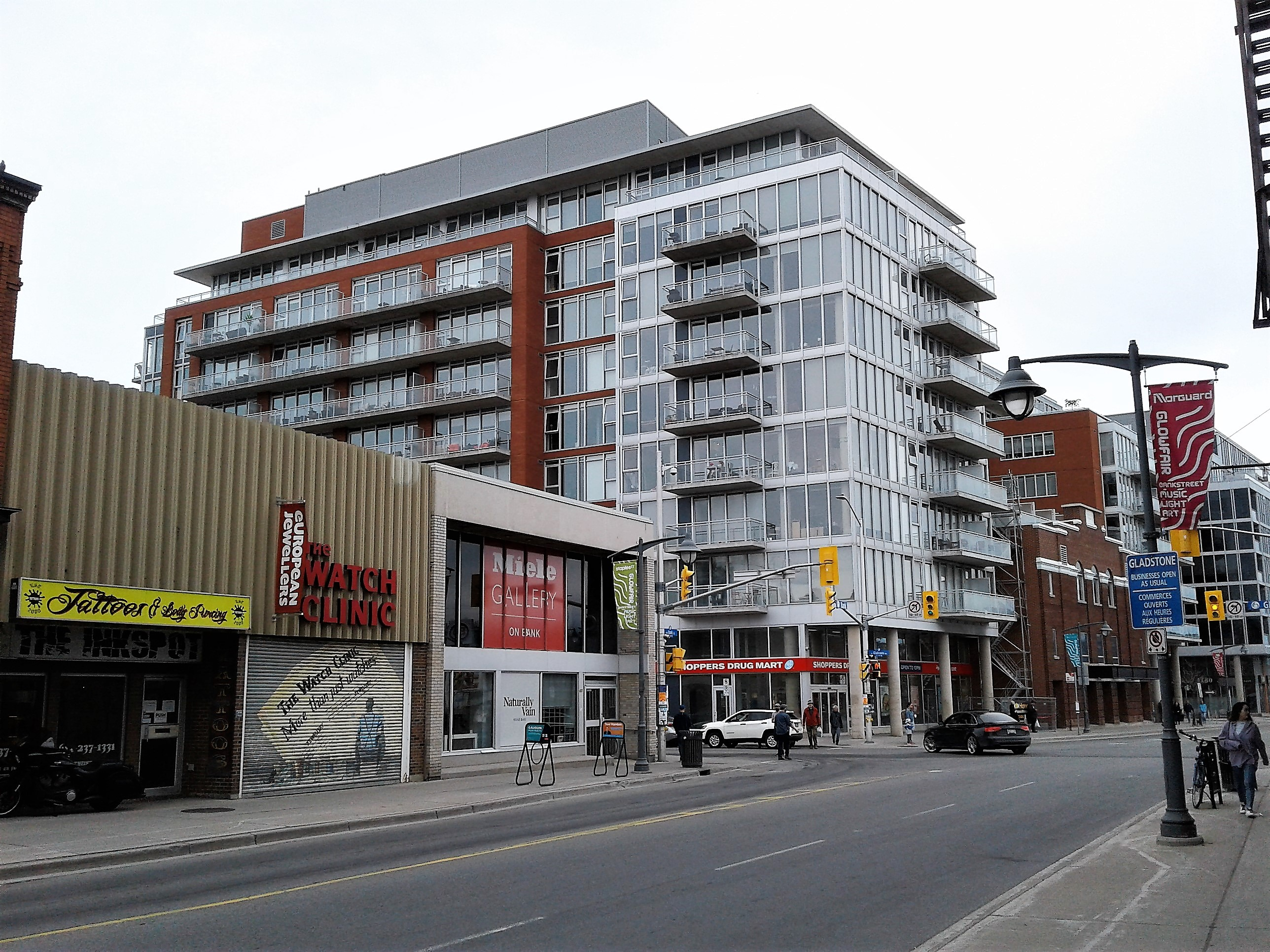
Intersection of Gladstone with Bank St.

Gladstone Avenue is a street in Ottawa running east from the Rideau Canal west to Parkdale Avenue. Historically a residential street running just south of the downtown core, a number of small houses in the downtown section have now been converted to commercial uses. The local pronunciation is phonetic, unlike that of William Ewart Gladstone's surname.

== Landmarks ==
- Connaught Public School, just east of Parkdale Avenue. (1149 Gladstone)
- Gladstone Theatre, just west of Preston Street
- Saint Nicholas Adult High School, at Booth Street.
- McNabb Arena and Community Centre at Percy Street, one block east of Bronson Avenue.

== Notable events ==
When laid out in the 1800s, the street was named Ann Street, after the wife of Thomas McKay. From 1896 until 1907, the Ottawa Hockey Club, commonly known as the Silver Seven, Stanley Cup winner, played its games at the Dey's Skating Rink at Bay Street and Gladstone.

Prince George himself cut the ribbon to open Connaught Public School in 1913.

In the 2000s, the street was modified to provide two lanes of traffic, bicycle lanes and traffic calming measures between Bronson Avenue and Bank Street.

In May 2005, the Salus Millennium House for the Homeless, located on Gladstone Avenue in Ottawa, was destroyed by fire.

== See also ==
- List of Ottawa, Ontario roads
