= Gladstone Theatre =

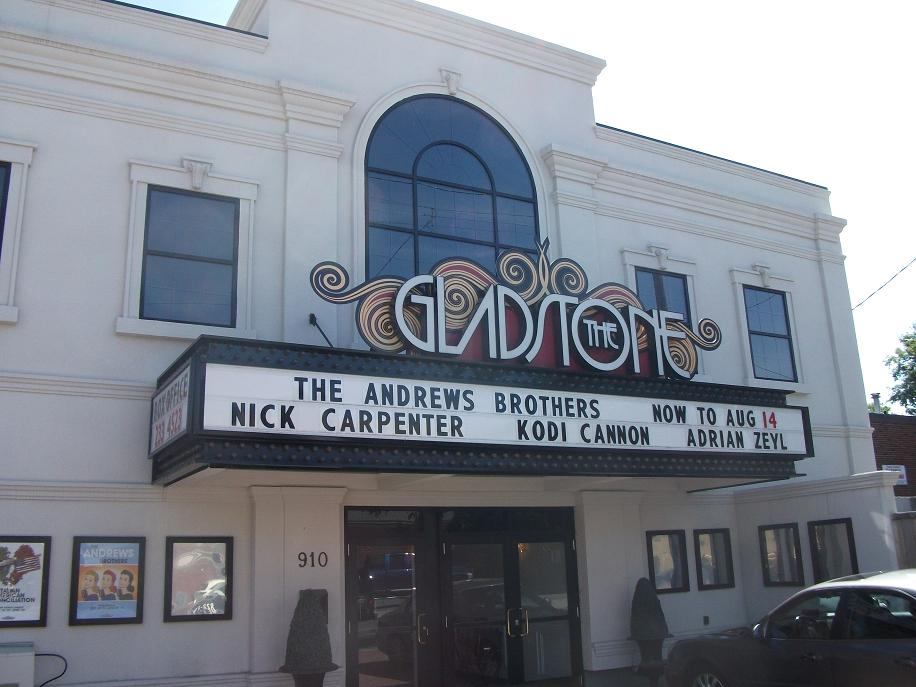
- The Gladstone

- Location within Ottawa

General information
- Type: Live theatre
- Location: 910 Gladstone Avenue, Ottawa, Ontario, Canada
- Coordinates: 45.4043549°N 75.714599°W

Other information
- Seating capacity: 230

The Gladstone is a live theatre in Ottawa, Ontario, Canada. The Gladstone is "Ottawa's Home of Independent Theatre," housing productions by local indie theatre companies. It is located on Gladstone Avenue just west of Preston Street. It is the former home of the Great Canadian Theatre Company.

== History ==
The building started out as a cinderblock garage. In 1982, Great Canadian Theatre Company converted it into a 230-seat theatre. In 2008, GCTC moved out into the Irving Greenberg Theatre Centre. The building was purchased by Steve Martin and Marilisa Granzotto, owners of a nearby Arthur Murray Dance Studio, and renovated at an approximate cost of CA$500,000. In 2011, Plosive Productions and SevenThirty Productions joined forces to take on the operation of the theatre. The partnership expanded to include shows by Black Sheep Theatre, Bear and Co., Same Day Theatre (in 2013), and Three Sisters Theatre Company (in 2014). In 2015, the theatre building was sold again, and a lease was signed to keep The Gladstone a theatre for years to come. In November 2016, The Gladstone Theatre Inc. was incorporated as a not-for-profit. By this time, The Gladstone was regularly housing twelve stylistically diverse theatre companies, with more than 27,000 tickets sold per year. During the process of incorporation, five Resident Companies were named: four professional indie companies, and one community theatre company. The newly minted Resident Companies had to have produced at least three shows at The Gladstone, and to make a commitment to continue producing at least one show per year. These five inaugural Resident Companies were Bear & Co., Black Sheep Theatre, Phoenix Players, Plosive Productions, and Three Sisters Theatre Company. As of December 2020, the seven Resident Companies are SevenThirty Productions, Plosive Productions, Three Sisters Theatre Company, Bear & Co., Pierre Brault, Phoenix Players, and Black Sheep Theatre.

== Theatre ==
The theatre holds approximately 230 persons for live performance. The theatre was renovated for its re-opening on September 11, 2008 with Art Deco style decoration.

== Controversy ==
Former theatre manager Don Fex was removed for sexual harassment of a minor in August 2020. Fex's confession in a social media post led to community backlash. This included an open letter calling for Fex's removal, which received over 700 signatures, and was received shortly before his dismissal three days after the initial complaint. The theatre faced further controversy in January 2021 for a marquee sign, reading "2021 - More Theatre, Less Drama please", perceived as making light of the situation.
