= Traders (TV series) =

- DVD cover
- Country of origin: Canada
- No. of seasons: 5
- No. of episodes: 83 (list of episodes)

Production
- Running time: 60 minutes

Original release
- Network: Global Television Network
- Release: February 1, 1996 – March 9, 2000

Traders is a Canadian television drama series, which was broadcast on Global Television Network from 1996 to 2000 and CBC Television from 1997 to 1998. The series centred on the employees of Gardner Ross, an investment bank in the Bay Street financial district of Toronto, Ontario.

== Series overview ==
Season	Episodes	Originally released	
Season	Episodes	First released	Last released
1	13	February 1, 1996	1996
2	13	1996	1997
3	22	1997	May 3, 1998
4	22	October 15, 1998	April 29, 1999
5	13	December 2, 1999	March 9, 2000

Although Global had locked up most of NBC's "Must See Thursday" situation comedies for their Thursday night broadcasts, they lost the rights to broadcast the medical drama ER to rival CTV. Traders was broadcast against ER in the 10 p.m. Thursday time slot. Many critics at the time believed the show would die an early death against the time slot competition, as ER had even beaten the other American networks in the time slot in a convincing manner. However, despite the stiff competition, Traders received good ratings, in part thanks to its lead-ins.

Bruce Gray and Sonja Smits starred as the firm's senior partners, Adam Cunningham and Sally Ross. The cast also included Patrick McKenna, David Cubitt, Rick Roberts, Chris Leavins, Gabriel Hogan, David Hewlett, Peter Stebbings and Alex Carter.

The show, although one of the most popular Canadian television series of its era, was expensive to produce. In the 1997–98 season, Global entered a joint production arrangement with CBC, and the series was shown on both networks for several months, with episodes airing Thursdays on Global and Fridays on CBC. However, this arrangement was not continued after the 1998 season.

The exterior shots of Gardner Ross are of the Canada Permanent Trust Building at 320 Bay Street in Toronto, currently the offices of CIBC Mellon.

== Characters ==
- Sally Ross (Sonja Smits), a former economics professor and the only daughter of Cedric Ross who is one of the partners in the firm. She takes control of the firm when her father is arrested for embezzlement, loses control of the firm back to him, and regains control on her father's death.
- Adam Cunningham (Bruce Gray), the Machiavellian elder statesman of the bank, although a junior partner to the Rosses. Like Sally, he comes from a rich family, but he fell on hard times when his father lost the family fortune. Less of a risk taker than Sally or Jack, Adam is often at odds with them. He is very much in love with his wife Gillian (Linda Goranson), who has an unidentified illness and is lobbying to be permitted assisted suicide.
- Marty Stephens (Patrick McKenna), the driven head trader of Gardner Ross, making the firm money through risky short term trades. Stephens often derides the senior partners as "overheads"—a double insult based on the fact that their offices are above the trading floor and, in his view, they eat up rent without bringing in any regular income. Although largely driven by money, he has a soft spot for his wife and two children.
- Jack Larkin (David Cubitt), the firm's ambitious young investment banker and junior partner. He grew up as a juvenile delinquent with an abusive father and got through college as a boxer. He became a trader in Vancouver before coming to Gardner Ross. He is also responsible for bringing Grant Janksy into the firm. Jack dies in the Season 4 episode, "I'll Sleep When I'm Dead" after being fatally shot by Martha, an operative of Jean Paul's company.
- Ann Krywarik (Kim Huffman), the firm's female broker. She started her career by specializing in accounts held by elderly single men. She is at times Jack's paramour. She works as a broker, trader and mutual fund manager. Grant Jansky, a colleague has feelings for her. Ann dies in the Season 3 episode, "Boomwith" after being caught in a limo explosion with the team being devastated by her death which is later revealed to be murder.
- Donald D'Arby (Rick Roberts), a young, smart and shy investment banker. He usually works for Jack and runs a mutual fund later in the series. D'Arby is from an extremely rich lumber family.
- Grant Jansky (David Hewlett), a brilliant but disturbed derivatives trader who despite his poor social skills is actually a genius, able to calculate numbers lightning fast in his head. He tends to keep to himself, although he is close to Donald and Jack. He is in love with Ann and often resents the way Jack treats her. In Season 3, Grant like the rest of the team is left devastated by Ann's death while a year later, during Season 4, Grant suffers another personal tragedy when in the episode, "The Old Man and the CEO", he learns that Jack has been shot and killed which has him nearly attacking Sally in a fit of rage, prompting security to drag Grant away. In "The Falcon and the Showman", Grant returns to work with a new serious demeanor and then angrily tells Sally never to speak to him again. In the Season 5 episode and series finale, "Nice Guys Finish Last", Grant is formally diagnosed as having a borderline personality disorder which has him suffering from delusions and also fits of rage. He is later given an anti-psychotic drug which proves to be a big help and results in his psychiatrist offering Grant a prescription to the drug. However, after Marty is stabbed, Grant, guilt-ridden begins blaming himself with Ziggy later visiting Grant and encouraging him to begin taking his medication again.
- Chris Todson (Chris Leavins), the firm's humorless head currency trader. He was raised on a farm in a religion that shuns modern technology (similar to the Mennonite), but is shunned after he had an affair with an older married woman. He is highly materialistic and has a sister named Lilly.
- Ian Farnham (Gabriel Hogan), a very handsome young investment banker, hired by Gardner Ross as a favor to his well-connected mother in order to grease the wheels of a pending deal, although Ian is unaware of this fact.
- Benny Siedleman (Ron Gabriel), the firm's primary bond trader, and the oldest man on the trading floor. He was Marty's first boss.
- Ziggy McLeod (Angela Vint) is the firm's receptionist early in the series. Later, she becomes a trainee on the trading floor.
- Niko Bach (Rachael Crawford) is brought into Gardner Ross by Phil Hoagland after he takes control of Gardner Ross. She is beautiful, exotic and a brilliant trader. She is the only trader Marty feels is capable of succeeding him as head trader. She has a short, kinky love affair with Chris.
- Cedric Ross (David Gardner), the "Ross" in Gardner Ross, and Sally's father. Sally eventually finds out that he was deeply involved in several illegal financial transactions, and attempts to keep him out of the firm. Although he regains control, his double life leads to his murder shortly thereafter, and Sally once again becomes the senior partner.
- Paul Deeds (Peter Stebbings) is brought into Gardner Ross by Phil Hoagland after he takes control of Gardner Ross. Paul is young, brilliant, but unprincipled investment banker. He steals research material from David Astin (William Pappas).

== Main crew ==
=== Directors ===
- Alex Chapple (8 episodes, 1996–1999)
- Reid A. Dunlop (6 episodes, 1998–2000)
- T. W. Peacocke (6 episodes, 1998–2000)
- Kari Skogland (5 episodes, 1996)
- Gordon Langevin (5 episodes, 1997–1998)
- John L'Ecuyer (5 episodes, 1998–1999)
- Stacey Stewart Curtis (4 episodes, 1996–1998)
- Alan Goluboff (4 episodes, 1996–1997)
- Alan Taylor (4 episodes, 1996–1997)
- Gary Harvey (4 episodes, 1998–1999)
- E. Jane Thompson (3 episodes, 1996–2000)
- George Mendeluk (3 episodes, 1996)
- Philip Earnshaw (3 episodes, 1998–2000)
- David Straiton (3 episodes, 1998)
- Henry Sarwer-Foner (2 episodes, 1997–1998)
- Keith Ross Leckie (2 episodes, 1997)
- Randy Bradshaw (2 episodes, 1998–1999)
- Michael DeCarlo (2 episodes, 1999–2000)
- Steve DiMarco (2 episodes, 1999)
- Scott Smith (2 episodes, 2000)

=== Writers ===
- Hart Hanson (83 episodes, 1996–2000)
- Peter Mitchell (12 episodes, 1998–2000)
- Alyson Feltes (7 episodes, 1996–2000)
- Graham Clegg (7 episodes, 1998–2000)
- Shelley Eriksen (7 episodes, 1998–2000)
- Maureen McKeon (6 episodes, 1997–1998)
- Jennifer Cowan (6 episodes, 1998–2000)
- David Shore (5 episodes, 1996)
- Ann MacNaughton (4 episodes, 1996–1998)
- Tim Southam (4 episodes, 1996–1998)
- Raymond Storey (3 episodes, 1996–1997)
- Jack Blum (3 episodes, 1996)
- Sharon Corder (3 episodes, 1996)
- Paul Aitken (3 episodes, 1998–1999)
- Michael Teversham (3 episodes, 1998)
- David Cole (2 episodes, 1996–1997)
- Allen Booth (2 episodes, 1996)
- Robert Sandler (2 episodes, 1996)
- David Young (2 episodes, 1998)

== Story arc ==
The entire series encompasses a large story arc, with several characters disappearing, and some reappearing, throughout the series. As such, like other series with a consistent story arc, it is often best to watch the episodes in order as plot points often cover several episodes and very few episodes stand entirely on their own.

=== Basic story line ===
Gardner Ross is a small Canadian investment bank that is somewhat profitable, but often faces a takeover by a larger institution due to its inability to compete in a global marketplace. Crisis strikes when senior partner Cedric Ross is jailed after money goes missing from an initial public offering. Fearing that his partner Adam Cunningham will take advantage of his absence to agree to a friendly takeover by a larger bank, he calls on his only child, Sally, to take care of his interests in his absence. Meanwhile, hotshot trader Jack Larkin is looking to break into investment banking and approaches Adam, who agrees to allow Larkin to join the firm if he can land another IPO. Jack undercuts a rival bank and wins the IPO, but as the investment syndicate falls through, Gardner Ross finds itself responsible for most of the underwriting of the issue, and if the sale goes poorly, faces the loss of all of its investment capital. Luckily, head trader Marty Stephens saves the day by making a large profit for the bank selling the issue into a cool market.

The three major players each have different agendas. Sally wishes both to keep the bank independent and to solidify her control of the bank despite her lack of experience. Adam wants to steer a safe course that will bring consistent but relatively low returns on capital. Jack seeks outgrowth at any cost seeking bigger and bigger deals, culminating in a $1 billion financing of a harbour project. This infuriates Marty who sees the plans of the investment bankers stealing capital away from his consistently profitable trading while putting him under pressure to bring more capital into the bank.

Meanwhile, the charges against Cedric are dropped on a technicality. However, Sally discovers that he did take an illegal commission on the IPO, and refuses to give up her control of the shares. Sally makes a misstep by bragging about the harbour project, nearly defaulting on a progress advance in the process - she has to be bailed out by a much larger bank, making the original deal totally unprofitable. The larger bank gets a share of Gardner Ross in the process, threatening Jack's expansion plans. Sally decides to take the company public to raise capital to pay off the larger bank, but with Adam's help this results in Cedric being able to buy enough shares to re-take control of Gardner Ross and force Sally out for ordering Marty to keep buying Gardner Ross stock in a futile attempt to stop him, technically violating capital requirements.

However, Cedric is soon murdered and his stock goes back to Sally. Adam is caught up in his own betrayal, but Sally keeps him on because his dismissal would end the firm's credibility on the street. Adam and Jack buy back in as partners. However, Jack is betrayed by Ann on a software investment and goes bankrupt when his shares in Gardner Ross don't cover the amount he borrowed to buy them. He unwisely assaults another banker and is suspended as a result.

Although Ann leaves the firm, she is soon wooed back by Adam to run the mutual fund being set up by the firm. Marty wants nothing to do with her although to get him to agree to sell a very poor bond issue (and ruin his reputation in the process), he is given managerial control of the firm. Marty fears another betrayal and the effect the mutual fund will have on the trading floor.

Jack soon recovers as he is reinstated and an investment in a diamond mine pays off huge dividends. However, the success is short lived after the tests turn out to be fraudulent. Benny loses his life savings as a result and gives up trading to marry Jack's sister Cathy. Sally pursues a relationship with a smitten billionaire, Phil Hoagland, but cuts it off when she realizes he has bipolar disorder and will not take medication to control it. Hoagland first tries to use his influence to destroy Gardner Ross, but when the firm gets in trouble again, he instead agrees to act as a white knight and save the firm at the expense of Sally leaving the firm. He brings Niko and Paul to the bank to look out for his interests.

Jack plans a new life himself with Ann, but Ann is murdered by a security company who is dependent on an unknowing Jack to launder their illegally obtained money. Jack finds out about the scheme and runs off with the money. Sally and Grant manage to freeze Jack's assets, but they only manage to enrage the security company when an attempted sting operation on Jack to get their money back can't be carried out because he has lost the funds. Jack is killed as a result. However, Sally uses his money to re-take control of the bank by buying Hoagland's shares.

The bank is once again thrown into crisis when Sally is diagnosed with cancer and has to undergo surgery and chemotherapy to keep it under control. As usual, she has to compete with Adam for managerial control and ownership of the bank during this time. After this major crisis, most of the rest of the series concentrates on the relationship between the character's personal lives and their work at the bank.

== Themes ==
Several themes are repeated during the course of the series.

David v. Goliath: Throughout the series, Gardner Ross is constantly comparing themselves to their larger competition. The investment bankers often trade blows with the much larger (if fictional) Canadian Corporate Bank (most likely based on one of Canada's Big Five). The trading floor's key competition is Federated Dundas, a brokerage firm with ten times the staff and capital, and the home of Marty's nemesis "McGrath" (played in a memorable cameo by Joe Flaherty, although otherwise unseen during the series). Even Canada's status with respect to the much larger economy of the United States is examined, with Sally eventually partnering with both a U.S. venture capital fund with twice her working capital and the entrepreneurial Texan who runs it.

Family: All of the characters have varying family troubles. Ironically, Marty has the most stable "nuclear" family with a wife and children, but even his relationship is rocky. On the other extreme, Ann is so disconnected from a family life that she listed Gardner Ross as her person to contact in case of an emergency. A few characters suffer the loss of a close family member during the series. Chris is alienated from his family, and despite the efforts of a family friend to mend the relationship with his father, he never manages to do it. Donald, similarly disowned, does manage to build bridges with his parents. Niko perhaps has the worst relationship history, cutting herself off from her own son in order to further her career, only to find herself caring for the child when her ex-husband is arrested.

However, obligations to family often prove problematic. Feeling guilty about abandoning his sister to their abusive father, Jack found his sister Cathy a job at the firm, and on her first day of work she engaged in an incident of insider trading. Similarly, fearing that his talented son would drop out of high school, Marty called in all his favours in order to prevent his son from having a job on a trading floor.

Business Ethics: The characters often grapple with ethical issues, and even Adam raises these issues on occasion. For example, to increase its cash flow, Gardner Ross attempts a takeover of a cigarette company that is actually trying to get out of the tobacco business. Marty is constantly "walking the line" on ethical issues, taking advantage of information that doesn't quite meet the criteria for insider trading on a near daily basis. Although he knows the rules, he consistently breaks the spirit of the law, and occasionally steps over the line. For example, when he took a short position on a stock that was put on the restricted list when Gardner Ross announced a takeover attempt, he covered the short in order to save the firm millions at the expense of its client.

Reputation: Gardner Ross is constantly trying to balance appearances with reality. For example, Adam is known as "The Most Trusted Man on Bay Street", although he consistently tries to take advantage of Sally. Despite this, rumours swirl around him, one about his wife's death (an assisted suicide) just out of the range of hearing. Conversely, Jack does not mind putting the firm in a position where the rest of Bay Street is "out to get him" - Jack openly steps on the toes of larger rivals in order to get deals. Marty too understands the importance of reputation - on one occasion after being suspended, he comes back to find that no-one will execute a trade with him, leaving him at the end of the day begging an old friend to execute any trade with him whatsoever.

== Cameos ==
The show featured cameos from several notable Canadian personalities playing themselves, including:

- Hon. John Manley MP - At the time was the sitting federal Minister for Industry
- Marianne Limpert - Olympic Silver Medalist swimmer
- Derek Porter - Olympic Gold medalist rower
- Edward (Eddie) Greenspan - Noted defense lawyer
- Bob Rae - Former Premier of Ontario and current MP. Ironically in the episode there is a scene where he says he will never go back into politics, but he in fact does about 10 years later.
- Michie Mee - Rapper
- Mike Bullard - Comedian, spoofed himself by playing a telephone repairman (Bullard is a former Bell Canada employee)
- Kim Stockwood - Singer, performed her song "12 Years Old"
- Izzy Asper - Then Owner of Global TV network which aired Traders. Asper plays piano incognito at a corporate event. Marty's drunken wife argues with him and declares: "Do you know who I am?" Izzy responds. "No, do you know who 'I' am?"

== Awards/Nominations ==
Near the peak of its run, Traders was frequently nominated in the Gemini Awards, earning 28 nominations and nine wins during its run. Most notable of the Gemini wins are the two consecutive awards for Best Dramatic Series in 1998.

== DVD release ==
Alliance Atlantis released season 1 on DVD in Region 1 (Canada only) on November 25, 2003. This release has been discontinued and is now out of print. Seasons 2-5 remain unreleased.

== Streaming ==
In 2019 the series started streaming online on the Canada Media Fund's Encore+ YouTube channel, the series was removed when Encore+ ceased operation in 2022 & all videos were taken down.

In the UK and Australia, it is available on Amazon Prime Video.

== See also ==
- Capital City, a British drama also involving investment bankers
