= Chris Leavins =

Canadian actor, playwright, author (born 1968)

- Born: 1968; Saskatchewan, Canada
- Years active: 1994 - present
- Known for: Satire
- Notable work: Cute With Chris; Todd and the Book of Pure Evil
- Website: www.chrisleavins.com

Chris Leavins is a Canadian actor and writer based in Los Angeles. Known for playing Atticus Murphy, Jr. the malevolent school guidance counselor on cult TV series Todd and the Book of Pure Evil. He has appeared in a number of successful Canadian television shows, been nominated for two Gemini Awards and shared in a Gemini Award for Ensemble Performance win. He also created and hosted satirical internet show, Cute With Chris.

== Early life ==
Born in 1968, Leavins resided in Saskatchewan, Canada as a youngster.

After 12 years living and working in Toronto, Leavins moved to Los Angeles in 2003.

== Career ==
Leavins has been a cast member or guest star on some of Canada's most popular and critically acclaimed television series including Traders (Gemini Winner 1997 and 1998, Best Dramatic Series), The Eleventh Hour (Gemini Winner 2002–03, Best Dramatic Series) and Slings and Arrows (Gemini Winner 2006, Best Dramatic Series) which airs in America on the Sundance Channel. Leavins appears in the 1997 film The Hanging Garden as William.

In 2010 Leavins was cast in the comedy horror TV series Todd and the Book of Pure Evil as Atticus Murphy Jr., the seemingly affable school guidance counselor who is secretly in league with the Satanic cult at the heart of Crowley High. He would return to the role the following year when the series was renewed for a second season. After the series ended on a cliffhanger, Leavins along with the rest of the cast returned to voice their characters in an animated feature film Todd and the Book of Pure Evil: The End of the End, which acted as a conclusion.

Leavins writes and performs for the stage as well. His shows Posterchild, The Captain, and The Best Play in the Fringe Festival Ever have been performed across North America.

In 2006 he started the internet show Cute with Chris, a satirical video podcast which he wrote, anchored, and produced himself from his apartment. The show features photos and letters sent in by viewers, which Leavins comments on, mocks, and subjects to polls on which is cutest. His show also features co-hosts: Colty, the female plastic horse, Pervy, the larger male perverted plastic horse with racist issues, and Peanuts, a bag of polystyrene peanuts that can only be understood by Leavins. The show's popularity increased over time, and the weekly episodes attracted up to 100,000 views each. Chris abruptly ceased production of the show in June 2009, ostensibly prompted by one of his viewers, informing him of how the show had aged him. Chris later confirmed on his website that this episode would be the last in the series.

On January 30, 2008, he performed a live version of the show for free at the 99-seat Hudson Theater in Hollywood, California. The show sold out in 85 minutes. Another two shows, this time charging money for tickets, were put on at the Theatre Centre, Toronto on April 19 and 20, 2008. Both sold out; the first in 20 minutes. Leavins has said that he sees this use of an Internet fan base to attract theatre audiences as a new model for success, and a solution to the difficulties that he experienced attracting audiences as a conventional writer and performer.

== Works ==
=== Features/TV movies ===
Year	Title	Role	Notes
1994	Nothing to Lose	Ed	
1996	Deeply, Deeply Trunk		Short film
1997	The Hanging Garden	Sweet William	
1998	American Whiskey Bar	He	TV movie
1999	Family of Cops III: Under Suspicion	Vincent Coelle	TV movie
2009	The Good Germany	Gordon Verlaine	TV movie
2017	Todd and the Book of Pure Evil: The End of the End	Atticus Murphy Jr. (voice)	Animated feature film

=== Television series ===
Year	Title	Role	Notes
1994	Robocop	Wilson Eberhart	1 episode
1995	Due South	Jim	1 episode
1996–2000	Traders	Chris Todson	Main cast
1998	La Femme Nikita	Gregory Formitz	1 episode
2003	Blue Murder	Carl Statler	1 episode
2003–2005	Bury the Lead (AKA The Eleventh Hour)	Danny Pahlka, Ross Hudson	3 episodes
2004	Zoe Busiek: Wild Card	Howard Leland, Jim Turner	1 episode
2006	Slings & Arrows	Andrew McTeague	4 episodes
2010–2012	Todd and the Book of Pure Evil	Atticus Murphy Jr.	Main cast

=== Stage ===
- Posterchild
- The Captain
- The Best Play in the Fringe Festival Ever

=== Books ===
- The Captain and other stories (2009)

== Awards and nominations ==
Leavins was nominated for a Gemini Award in the Best Supporting Actor category for his work as Christopher Todson in the series Traders in 1997, and for Best Actor in a Guest Role for his work on Slings and Arrows in 2007. In 2011, alongside his fellow Todd and the Book of Pure Evil main cast-mates, won the Gemini Award for Best Ensemble Performance for musical episode "The Phantom of Crowley High".
