= List of The Next Step episodes =

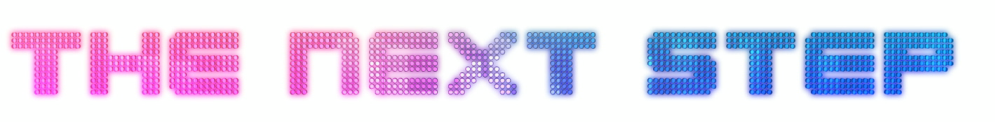

The Next Step is a Canadian teen drama series created by Frank van Keeken and produced by Temple Street Productions. Shot in a dramatic mockumentary style, the series focuses on a group of dancers who attend the Next Step Dance Studio.

During the course of the series, 275 episodes of The Next Step were released over ten seasons, between March 8, 2013, and July 12, 2025.

== Series overview ==
Season	Episodes	Originally released (Canada)		
Season	Episodes	First released	Last released	Network
1	30	March 8, 2013	January 3, 2014	Family Channel
2	34	March 7, 2014	January 2, 2015	Family Channel
3	30	March 16, 2015	December 11, 2015	Family Channel
4	40	February 15, 2016	May 12, 2017	Family Channel
5	20	May 26, 2017	December 13, 2017	Family Channel
6	26	September 29, 2018	April 7, 2019	Family Channel
Special	2	December 21, 2019		YouTube
7	24	April 10, 2020	September 18, 2020	CBC Gem
8	27	September 26, 2022	November 24, 2022	YTV
9	22	May 13, 2024	June 17, 2024	YTV
10	20	June 30, 2025	November 10, 2025	YTV

== Episodes ==
=== Season 1 (2013–14) ===
No. overall	No. in season	Title	Directed by	Written by	Original UK air date	Original Can. air date
Part 1
1	1	"Get the Party Started"	Brian K. Roberts	Frank van Keeken	April 7, 2014	March 8, 2013
The dancers of A- and B-Troupe must audition to earn a spot in A-Troupe, and are divided into four groups by Kate and Chris. When the fourth group of dancers are about to start their audition, an unknown dancer named Michelle, who has just moved from Madison, Wisconsin, enters the studio to audition. The previous year's dance captain, Emily, feels threatened by the arrival of Michelle. Kate speaks to Michelle in her office – Kate is delighted to let Michelle audition, as Michelle was dance captain at her previous studio as well as being Miss National Soloist.
2	2	"Everybody Dance Now"	Brian K. Roberts	Frank van Keeken and Chloe van Keeken	April 8, 2014	March 12, 2013
Giselle does not make it into A-Troupe, and is later removed from Emily's E-Girls clique for not being in A-Troupe. Emily promises to get Giselle back in A-troupe. West and Chloe are promoted to A-Troupe, and Chloe joins the E-Girls upon her promotion. Her family are not rich and she is worried about not being able to keep up with the girls shopping trips. Stephanie lies to Michelle about where rehearsals are, so Michelle is late and in trouble with the adult leaders. Despite this, they offer Michelle the dance captaincy - but she says no, worried about being too new. The adults ask Michelle and Emily to train two dancer groups to show their abilities as captains. James has dated Beth who is now in B-Troupe, and Amanda, who is now at Elite which is a rival studio.
3	3	"Dance, Dance"	Brian K. Roberts	Chloe van Keeken	April 9, 2014	March 13, 2013
Tired of the fighting, Kate and Chris give Michelle the opportunity to compete to be dance captain versus Emily, since Michelle had been dance captain at her previous studio. Each dance captain candidate has to choreograph a dance for half the members of A Troupe. But when Chris chooses the groups, Emily is not in the same group as Stephanie, her best friend. Stephanie sabotages Michelle's team dance for Emily. Kate is unimpressed with Michelle's team's effort, and all the dancers in A-Troupe start to argue over who should be dance captain. Riley feels Stephanie's behavior shows that Emily is feeling overly threatened by Michelle. Kate begins to panic at the arguing, so Chris throws out ping pong balls for the group to clean up, but eventually everyone starts dancing together, forgetting about the dance captain situation. Meanwhile, James is about to get kicked out of the studio for failing math. Chris says that he will help James with math, so James' mom gives him a second chance. West tries to befriend James by randomly staging dance-offs with him in public.
4	4	"Rock and a Hard Place"	Brian K. Roberts	Rachael Schaefer	April 10, 2014	March 14, 2013
A dance competition is coming up that weekend, so Kate and Chris think they should decide the dance line positions. Emily persuades them to let her make the decision, which leads her to putting Michelle in the back row. After Riley finds out that Emily lied to A-Troupe about having the list reviewed by Kate and Chris, she approaches James and asks him if he thinks her being in the front over Michelle is fair, he gives her his honest opinion and tells her that it is not. So she switches her front line position with Michelle in the middle of a rehearsal. Emily is outraged that her sister betrayed her, and the E-Girls vote to kick Riley out of their clique. Also, Daniel choreographs a routine for J-Troupe, while Tiffany uses J-Troupe to mess with him.
5	5	"Steal My Sunshine"	Mitchell T. Ness	Chloe van Keeken	April 11, 2014	March 15, 2013
The A-Troupe members go to the beach for a day off while the E-Girls run Dance Camp for the younger children in the "Baby Ballet" class, which freaks Chloe out. At the beach, Riley loses Emily's necklace and the group has to find it before they leave the beach. Meanwhile, one of the little kids at dance camp gets lost on Chloe's watch, and the E-Girls have to find her before dance camp is over. With the help of her fellow dancers, Riley is able to find Emily's necklace after borrowing a beachgoer's metal detector, while the E-Girls find the missing girl, Margie.
6	6	"Good Girls Go Bad"	Frank van Keeken	Story by : Cole Bastedo; Teleplay by : Rachael Schaefer	April 14, 2014	March 22, 2013
At Emily's insistence, the A-Troupe visits the Elite studio to see what Elite is doing for regionals. West and Daniel stay back at The Next Step to rehearse dancing, as does Riley, while the rest go to Elite. Riley asks James to go along to keep an eye out for Michelle as he is the only one she feels she can trust to keep Emily from scheming against Michelle. Michelle gets caught by Elite's dance troupe, captain Amanda, and coach Lucien, while filming their routine. When Stephanie reports back that Michelle has been caught by Elite, the rest of the group leaves her there at Emily's suggestion. After fighting over studio space, Daniel and West end up choreographing a duet together.
7	7	"Love Story"	Brian K. Roberts	Frank van Keeken	April 21, 2014	April 19, 2013
Upon their return to The Next Step, Riley confronts Emily and the others, and Emily reveals they abandoned Michelle at Elite when Michelle got caught. This makes Riley angry, and she confronts Emily about being threatened by Michelle. Having been caught by Elite in their studio, Michelle is frightened and embarrassed. In confessional, Michelle admits she volunteered to film some of Elite's dancing to try to make a friendship with Emily. Michelle pretends to audition for Elite as a cover story, and Elite considers recruiting her. Kate and Chris order A-Troupe to pair up, to work on duets routines, but just as they notice Michelle missing, Michelle returns to the studio declaring that she had just been at Elite. Kate is worried Michelle plans to leave the studio, but Michelle assures her that this is not the case. Riley discovers Emily's plan to push Michelle out of the studio, and she and James begin to plan to replace Emily with Michelle as dance captain, but Michelle refuses their offer. Eldon finally gets Emily to go out on a date, a "pity date", with him, but it does not go well.
8	8	"Just the Two of Us"	Brian K. Roberts	Rachael Schaefer	April 28, 2014	April 26, 2013
Eldon, having agreed to be both Michelle's and Emily's duet partners, realizes that he has feelings for both of them. But neither Michelle nor Emily know that Eldon is also the duet partner of the other. Chloe has no dance partner for the duets. Stephanie is very bossy with her duet partner West, which just makes West want to quit the duet, though West eventually talks Stephanie into compromising. Stephanie tells Kate that she wants to become a "triple-threat", meaning Stephanie wants to pursue acting and singing as well as dance. When Michelle and Emily both demand that Eldon choose one of them, he instead does a duet with neither of them, but with Chloe instead.
9	9	"Video Killed the Radio Star"	Brian K. Roberts	Ian Van Den Hurk	May 5, 2014	May 3, 2013
The band Brighter Brightest is coming to make a music video with the A-Troupe dancers featured in the video. Riley is such a huge fan of Brighter Brightest that she stammers incoherently when trying the talk to the band, leading the band to think she's a foreign girl who doesn't speak any English. James and Riley are caught bickering and told they have a lot of chemistry and are going to be the center of the music video. The female and male dancers split up after arguments where the boys are making animal noises and acting childishly. Eventually they join back together to create a great routine for the music video. James admits to having feelings for Riley in confessional, while Riley denies it but may be changing her mind after James gets an autograph from the band for her as a gift.
10	10	"Road to Joy"	Mitchell Ness	Rachael Schaefer	May 12, 2014	May 10, 2013
Kate tasks Riley with going downtown to pick up the costumes for regionals, and James insists on going along, solely to spend time with her. On the way, he begs Riley to stop and get shawarmas. But, when they get back on the bus, James doesn't have a transfer, and when Riley presents her transfer to the bus driver, James rips her transfer in order to force Riley to stay with him. James insists that they take a shortcut through the park where they encounter James's "kooky" aunt which delays them further. When they finally arrive at the costume shop, it is closed and Riley goes off on James. They manage to get the costumes after-hours, when they impress the owners with their dancing. As they head back to the studio on the bus, Riley and James hold hands. Kate arranges a photo shoot for Stephanie, to further her dream of being a "triple threat", but Stephanie is stiff and the shoot goes badly at first. But when Kate, Tiffany and Chloe suggest that Stephanie start dancing to loosen up, the shoot starts to go well.
11	11	"Can You Keep a Secret?"	Brian K. Roberts	Rachael Schaefer	May 19, 2014	May 17, 2013
The A-Troupe auditions for soloists for regionals begin. While Daniel earns the solo, he injures his ankle during his audition routine, but keeps it a secret from everyone. Michelle figures out Chloe has a job, and when Chloe is late for soloist auditions, Emily goes off on Chloe in an unnecessarily mean diatribe. Michelle stands up for Chloe to Emily, giving a speech about how Emily is being a bully before walking out. This gives the impression that Michelle is going to Elite. But, when Riley and James find her in Squeezed, she announces to them that she has decided that she will join them in trying to overthrow Emily as dance captain for the good of the team.
12	12	"Get It Together"	Brian K. Roberts	Story by : Cole Bastedo; Teleplay by : Chloe van Keeken	May 26, 2014	May 24, 2013
Michelle, Riley and James start planning a new choreographed dance routine for regionals, to replace Emily's routine which is perceived as boring and traditional, and use this to overthrow Emily as dance captain. As they start to choreograph their routine, they get West and Daniel to join in the dance, as they also think Michelle's routine is superior and that she would be a much better dance captain. When the group is late for rehearsals, Emily suspects something is up. After Emily rejects Chloe's dance move, Michelle, Riley, James, West, and Daniel show Chloe the new choreography, and ask her if she wants to join. Chloe immediately says no, and leaves upset at them for trying to overthrow Emily, her fellow E-Girl. Emily and Eldon start to get closer, as they talk about their families, and hold hands in the juice bar. Seeing this makes Michelle upset for an "unknown" reason. Also, Stephanie gets help from Tiffany on her acting skills. After Kate and Stephanie return from meeting with an acting agent, Stephanie gets a phone call confirming that she has gotten her first agent.
13	13	"Don't Go Breaking My Heart"	Samir Rehem	Chloe van Keeken	June 2, 2014	May 31, 2013
Emily tries to figure out what Michelle's group of dancers is doing. After Emily once again bullies her, Chloe also joins Michelle's group. Eldon tries to prove to the A-Troupe dancers that he and Emily are serious, by publicly declaring his feelings for Emily in front of everyone. His plan does not go well, and Emily feels humiliated, and she lashes out at Eldon in front of A-Troupe declaring that she will "never be his girlfriend". In confessional, Emily later admits that she regrets being so harsh with Eldon. After his public humiliation by Emily, Michelle's group decides to invite Eldon into their dance. While they are performing their dance for Eldon, Stephanie searches for Chloe and discovers Michelle's and the others performing their dance routine for Eldon, and runs to tell Emily.
14	14	"Sabotage"	Samir Rehem	Frank van Keeken	June 9, 2014	June 7, 2013
The E-Girls have found out about Michelle's rival routine. Stephanie takes Michelle's phone and sends mean texts to Emily's phone in order to frame Michelle for bullying, in order to get her kicked out of The Next Step. Riley sees this, and hides Michelle's phone so it won't be found. James takes his big math test, but after trying to lie to Riley about it, admits that he likely failed his exam, which means James' mother will pull him out of The Next Step. Emily tells Kate about Michelle's alleged bullying, and the truth about Michelle's alternate dance routine is revealed in response. To settle it, Kate asks for Michelle's group to perform their choreographed dance routine, and then have A-Troupe vote on which routine, and thus which dance captain, they choose. Kate and Chris like Michelle's routine. A-Troupe then votes for captain, and Michelle wins 8–2, with only Stephanie and Emily voting for Emily to remain as captain. Heartbroken at the rejection and the perceived betrayal, and after Kate tells Emily that she doesn't want to hear any complaints over the result, Emily and Stephanie exit the studio.
Part 2
15	15	"Changes"	Samir Rehem	Frank van Keeken	September 10, 2014	September 20, 2013
Emily and Stephanie struggle with Michelle as the new dance captain, and the E-Girls clique is now dead, with Stephanie even rejecting Tiffany. Michelle attempts to befriend Emily, as Michelle doesn't want a bad relationship with Emily, but Emily rejects Michelle's overture. James is about to be pulled out of the studio by his mother, but Michelle convinces her to allow James to forgo dancing for two weeks so that James can focus on his studies to improve his grades in math – if James improves his grades, his mother agrees to allow him to return to The Next Step at the end of the two weeks. Riley is also upset – she makes a deal with James that if he gets 70% or higher on his Math exam, she will go on a date with him. James is overjoyed by this development. Emily refuses to properly participate in Michelle's new choreography in any of the dance rehearsals. Riley's and Emily's relationship hits rock bottom when Emily tells Riley that they are "no longer sisters".
16	16	"Help"	Samir Rehem	Frank van Keeken and Rachael Schaefer	September 17, 2014	September 27, 2013
Michelle's captaincy gets praised by the dancers once again. Everybody gets mad at Emily for not trying during practice at all. Emily confesses her feelings to Kate about no longer being Dance Captain, and Kate tells Emily that she will have to work hard so she can still be a part of the team. James is studying math hard to improve his grades. Eldon is still mad at Emily for how she treated him, but offers to help Emily learn the new choreography after she confesses that she is unable to master it. In confessional, Emily admits that she has been a bad dance captain, because she was rejecting others' suggestions and tailoring the choreography to her specific skills as a dancer. Emily is starting to have feelings for Eldon during their practice sessions. She decides to finally accept Michelle as dance captain. Michelle decides to change the line positions for the routine and has everyone re-audition for their spots. Stephanie will not accept Michelle, and fails to show up for the auditions. With Eldon's help, Emily actually does well in her audition, but Michelle still puts Emily in the back row, which destroys Emily's desire to work with Michelle.
17	17	"Forget You"	Samir Rahem	Rachael Schaefer	September 24, 2014	October 4, 2013
Emily confronts Michelle about her placement in the back row, saying Michelle put her in the back row just because Michelle has an enormous crush on Eldon. Michelle denies this, but later admits in confessional that she does have a "little" crush on him. Eldon comforts Emily and after they talk a little, they share a kiss. Eldon talks to Michelle about Emily's line placement and Michelle promises she will switch Emily and Eldon's positions. Meanwhile, Stephanie auditions for a commercial and the director pretends to like her, but behind her back declares that Stephanie was awful – Stephanie overhears this and is embarrassed and tries to leave but is called back. Riley makes math cue cards for James, but states that they are just friends when confronted about it by Tiffany. Michelle reveals she will switch Emily and Eldon and everyone disagrees but they let her do it anyway. Emily does not know about this, and she and Stephanie go to audition at Elite. At The Next Step, Riley runs into rehearsal and declares that Emily and Stephanie are leaving the studio, surprising and angering everyone.
18	18	"Brand New"	Patrick Sisam	Chloe van Keeken	October 1, 2014	October 11, 2013
A-Troupe decides to hold auditions for two new dancers to replace Emily and Stephanie. They let B-Troupe members audition and Giselle is desperate to make it back into A-Troupe. Emily and Stephanie perform their auditions for Lucien and Amanda at Elite. Riley goes to James' school to teach him Michelle's routine and sees that he is stressed out about his upcoming math test. Riley quizzes him and he gets all of the answers right. When she asks for a high five to congratulate him, he pulls her in for a hug instead. She then teaches James the routine and they dance together. It is later revealed that James feels like anything is possible with Riley and is happy that she sticks by him and believes in him. Eldon goes to Elite to see how Emily is doing and she promises that even if they are at different studios, they will always be together. But just as Kate and Chris are about to reveal the two new A-Troupe dancers, Stephanie enters and asks if she can audition for A-Troupe because she did not make it at Elite. But Emily did, leaving Stephanie behind.
19	19	"First Date"	Frank van Keeken	Chloe Van Keeken	March 8, 2013	October 18, 2013
Stephanie is allowed to audition for A-Troupe despite how angry everyone is with her. Despite this, Stephanie is readmitted and cries happy tears when she makes it. Later James walks in to see Riley dancing a solo to a song called "Where Did Everybody Go?", and it stirs him up a little. He passes his math test with a B+, earning him his readmission into A-Troupe, and a date with Riley. Giselle successfully auditions back into A-Troupe as well. Michelle and Stephanie agree to create a new regionals routine as Emily might share A-Troupe's choreography with Elite's troupe. After choreographing it, Daniel begins to mark the routine, Kate tells him he needs to work harder or his solo will be taken away. Daniel practices alone and states that his injury is much better now. Michelle and Eldon choreograph a duet together for regionals, and Michelle believes there is something between them. James and Riley go on their first date at the studio, where James' theme for the date is food from many different countries – they eat, dance, and kiss at the end.
20	20	"We Are Family"	Frank van Keeken	Story by : Chloe van Keeken; Teleplay by : Chloe van Keeken and Brian Hartigan	March 8, 2013	October 25, 2013
Riley tries to repair her relationship with her sister, but Emily initially resists. Later, Emily agrees to try to make things right between them. Eldon takes Emily on a date, but Emily doesn't like the food he brings, so they decide to talk. That makes Eldon like Michelle a bit more. Emily is in the back row at Elite, but Amanda and Lucien agree she can move to the middle row after Emily seemingly improves. When Emily and Riley talk, Riley tells Emily she went on a date with James, and she needs advice to know if they're in a relationship or not. Emily tells her to be straight with James and ask him. While Eldon dances his duet with Michelle, Riley arrives and reminds him he's supposed to be at a date with Emily. This lets Eldon know that he is in love with Michelle, not Emily. Riley pulls James aside, so she can ask him if they're in a relationship or not – Riley declares that she would like to be, and James runs and hugs her. Riley and James are officially in a relationship.
21	21	"Break Stuff"	Frank van Keeken	Brian Hartigan	March 8, 2013	November 1, 2013
Giselle and Daniel want to do an overhead lift called "the helicopter" in the routine, but Kate says no because it is too risky. They talk to Michelle and she lets them show it to her. They do and Michelle loves it and allows them do the lift. Meanwhile, Stephanie gets a role on a television show, only to find out it is filming the same weekend as the regionals competition. Also, West runs into a member from his former dance crew, Marcel, and he doesn't want Marcel to know that he is in A-Troupe at The Next Step, since West left the crew without telling Marcel. When demonstrating the routine to Kate, Daniel and Giselle attempt the helicopter lift, and Daniel badly sprains his ankle. He has to leave A-Troupe, as he will be out indefinitely, and will not being able to take part in regionals. Daniel is devastated.
22	22	"Come Back... Be Here"	Frank van Keeken	Rachael Schaefer	March 8, 2013	November 8, 2013
Michelle declares that they need to get Emily to back in order to compete at regionals. After initial resistance, the others agree. A-Troupe goes to Elite to convince Emily to rejoin The Next Step, but Emily refuses, as she has moved up to the front row at Elite. Amanda says "hi" to James, and in confessional, Riley admits that it is difficult, as James has dated so many girls. With Daniel out, James has the regionals solo, but he can't get it right. James' grades begin to slip again, but he only cares about getting the solo right. Eventually James tells Kate he can't do the solo, as it is too much. Kate tries to give the solo to West, but West refuses out of loyalty to James. Emily secretly overhears Amanda and Lucien plotting to kick her out of Elite just before regionals – getting Emily to join Elite was just a ploy to sabotage The Next Step. Eldon confesses to Michelle that he wants to be with her. Just then, Emily returns to The Next Step, and she and Eldon hug. But Eldon now wants to be with Michelle, who thinks Emily and Eldon are not meant to be.
23	23	"Dancing in the Street"	Mitchell Ness	Chloe van Keeken	March 8, 2013	November 15, 2013
A-Troupe agree to a dance battle with "Seeds", West's former dance crew. Emily and Stephanie finally make up and become friends again. When Seeds arrive at The Next Step, everyone finds out that West used to dance with Seeds. West is forced to pick a crew to dance with, and he picks The Next Step. Emily begins to captain A-Troupe in areas Michelle falters at, and Michelle contemplates bringing Emily on as her co-captain. Michelle begins to avoid Eldon because he is still dating Emily, and Emily is back at The Next Step. A-Troupe loses the street dance battle to Seeds, and they are upset. Back at the studio, Emily declares that she is happy that they lost, because now they are competing against Seeds at regionals and know they need to get better. She offers to buy all of A-Troupe a juice, which they accept. Michelle pulls Emily aside to tell Emily that she wants Emily to be her co-captain. Emily is shocked.
24	24	"Price Tag"	Mitchell Ness	Chloe van Keeken	November 22, 2013	TBA
Emily accepts Michelle's offer to be co-captain of A-Troupe, and they agree that they need to create a new routine for regionals. Chloe's financial problems finally boil over when she is late for a payment with Kate again, and Chloe confesses to Kate that she has a job on the side in order to pay for The Next Step and regionals. Chloe decides it would be best for her to leave A-Troupe, as she is unable to pull her weight, financially. Co-captains Michelle and Emily decide to work together and encourage the team to help Chloe. The team goes to the restaurant Chloe works in – initially it seems they are only there to give Chloe a hard time, but they all end up giving her huge tips, which she uses to pay for regionals. Chloe rejoins A-Troupe.
25	25	"Bad Moon Rising"	Derby Crewe	Story by : Cole Bastedo; Teleplay by : Frank van Keeken	November 29, 2013	TBA
A-Troupe is practicing for regionals, and Emily says they can all go home as a reward. Chris and Kate enter to suggest that they should just have a night where they hang out at the studio as friends. A-Troupe begins by playing "truth or dare". Later, Kate wants to put a movie on – there is a dance-off to pick the movie, with James winning – he gives the choice to Riley. Afterwards, they return to "truth or dare". Emily challenges Michelle, who chooses "truth", and Emily asks who Michelle would like to date in A-Troupe. Michelle picks West, not wanting to expose her secret crush on Eldon. Eldon later tells Michelle that he wants to break up with Emily, but Michelle says that would tear the team apart. The girls and boys tell ghost stories – the loser has to pay for pizza. Stephanie's attempt fails, but West tells a story about The Next Step's former history as a chicken factory – in a chicken costume, James scares Riley, so the boys win. The girls retaliate with several pranks on the boys, including having a cop show up and arrest James. The guys are shocked at being double-pranked, as the cop is Giselle's uncle and Kate is in on it.
26	26	"Can't Fight This Feeling"	Kim Derko	Rachael Schaefer	December 6, 2013	TBA
Excitement turns to worry when the wrong costumes for regionals are delivered to The Next Step. A-Troupe try on other costumes found in studio B, where James puts a chicken costume on and scares Riley, who is scared of chickens. Riley later says that he defiantly lost brownie points on that joke. They also try on the costumes Giselle picks up but they don't pass muster either. Stephanie reveals that she got the part she auditioned for in Break Stuff, but that it films the same week as regionals – Stephanie is informed she must make a choice. Michelle finally confesses to Eldon that she has feelings for him and wants to be with him, but Eldon says he has moved on, greatly upsetting Michelle. Stephanie ultimately decides to give up the television show and go to the regionals with The Next Step.
27	27	"I'm So Excited"	Mitchell Ness	Frank van Keeken	December 13, 2013	TBA
Regionals are about to begin. Before A-Troupe leaves The Next Step, a recovering Daniel and J-Troupe play them a song to wish them good luck. Once The Next Step arrives at the venue for regionals, so does Elite, who get to skip registration since Elite won last year. Amanda attempts to break A-Troupe apart but fails. When West realizes that Seeds is missing a member from their crew and will not be able to compete, he wants to perform with them so they don't forfeit. Everyone in A-Troupe, and Marcel the captain of Seeds, says no. But after a bit of convincing, West is allowed to perform with Seeds. Seeds end up scoring 88 out of 100 points from the judges, and advance to the next round. Just as A-Troupe are about to perform, West barely arrives in time and says he hurt his ankle dancing with Seeds – but West is only joking with them. A-Troupe take the stage to perform.
28	28	"Fancy Footwork"	Mitchell Ness	Frank van Keeken	December 20, 2013	TBA
A-Troupe does their first routine in regionals competition, and they manage to advance to the second round. Then they advance to the third. But in the third round, one of Riley's gloves gets caught in a feather on her hairbow near the end of their routine, and their performance suffers some. The Next Step ends up getting eliminated in the round, and the dancers are all heartbroken, especially Riley who blames herself. But Emily and the rest tell Riley it is not her fault. James reminds them all that they could be given the wild-card spot which will allow them to advance to the semifinals. The rest are excited by the prospect. The Next Step is called back onstage, along with two other eliminated dance troupes. It is announced that The Next Step is chosen as the wild-card group, and they will advance to the semifinal round. Everyone is ecstatic.
29	29	"This Is How We Do It"	Mitchell Ness	Frank van Keeken	December 27, 2013	TBA
The Next Step competes in the semifinals against Seeds. The Next Step's performance is nearly flawless which gets them a score of 93/100, narrowly beating Seeds' score of 91/100, and advancing them to the finals. In the other semifinals, Elite easily beats Dance Inc. After Elite's win, Amanda starts to make fun of Emily, who walks away with Riley, forcing Eldon to follow since she is his girlfriend. Eldon and Emily talk it through, and when Emily goes to kiss Eldon he moves away. James gets on Riley's nerves for joking around, and Riley yells at him in front of the whole group. Riley later pulls James aside and apologizes for yelling at him – she admits to getting stressed, while James is calm and relaxed in these situations. They both agree to try to be more respectful and supportive of the way the other person is. Emily is starting to notice Eldon's and Michelle's feelings for each other as they practice. Emily mentions to the troupe that Elite will have a plane as a prop in their finals routine. The Next Step votes to counter that by showcasing Eldon's and Michelle's duet in their finals performance against Elite.
30	30	"Winner Takes All"	Mitchell Ness	Frank van Keeken	January 3, 2014	TBA
The Next Step is about to face off against Elite in the finals. Eldon reveals to Michelle that he wants to be with her and had lied when he said he had moved on. Eldon promises to tell Emily after regionals. Before performing, Emily begs Eldon to tell her the truth, and Eldon confesses to wanting to be with Michelle. Emily is heart-broken and furious, but has to focus on the performance. James notices Beth backstage, and confronts her on being there – Beth tells James she still loves him. When Riley asks what Beth said, James doesn't tell her, so she won't be distracted during their performance. Elite performs their airplane-themed routine first. The Next Step then perform a Romeo and Juliet-themed routine, with Eldon and Michelle as Romeo and Juliet being the centerpiece. In confessional, Emily says that everything has been handed to Michelle, including the one thing Emily always thought she would have. The Next Step beats Elite Studio in the finals, and are proclaimed regionals champions. After winning, Emily snatches the trophy away and shoots Michelle a cold stare. Riley jumps into James' arms and they hug and kiss onstage in front of everybody, including Beth.

=== Season 2 (2014–15) ===
No. overall	No. in season	Title	Directed by	Written by	Original Can. air date	Original UK air date
Part 1
31	1	"Don't Stop the Party"	Frank van Keeken	Frank van Keeken	March 7, 2014	TBA
After winning regionals, The Next Step throws A-Troupe a party. The team reflects on the euphoria of winning, and their strength as a group. Michelle admits that the Emily and Eldon situation is still an issue. Emily arrives at the party, intending to make everybody believe she is calm and collected. But she blurts out that Michelle and Eldon are in a relationship to everyone there while feigning extreme happiness and forcing everybody to give a round of applause. Riley is wary as she notices Beth flirting with James. As the party finishes, Amanda arrives, declaring that she is there to audition. They ask what she is talking about, and Amanda explains "The Challenge" – after winning regionals, dancers from other studios can challenge to audition for the nationals team. Emily and Michelle discuss whether to allow The Challenge. As the conversation ends, Michelle asks if they are cool, but is met with hostility when Emily replies, "As ice." The captains agree to The Challenge. A-Troupe discover that they have to re-audition for the nationals team, facing dancers from other studios like Amanda. Chris tells Kate he is leaving The Next Step to become co-owner of a rival dance studio.
32	2	"My Boyfriend's Back"	Frank van Keeken	Frank van Keeken	March 7, 2014	TBA
Kate's sister, Phoebe, who is New Age-y and into yoga, becomes the new head choreographer of The Next Step. Kate speaks of The Challenge, and after a vote, it is decided that The Next Step will hold auditions for the nationals team, which means some of the current members of A-Troupe from the regionals team may not make it onto the nationals team. After seeing Amanda getting kicked out Elite by Lucien at the mall, Michelle allows Amanda audition for A-Troupe as part of The Challenge. Hunter, a dancer from Madison, Wisconsin, and a childhood friend of Michelle's, arrives. Hunter is under the impression that Michelle is still his girlfriend. This makes Eldon jealous. When Michelle tells Hunter that she has a boyfriend and has moved on, Hunter and Emily hatch a scheme so that Emily can get Eldon back and Hunter can get Michelle back.
33	3	"Ready to Start"	Mitchell Ness	Frank van Keeken and Rachael Schaefer	March 7, 2014	TBA
The Next Step holds auditions for A-Troupe after Phoebe is introduced. Two J-Troupe members, Noah and Richelle, audition, as do some B-Troupe members, like Beth. Another dancer from a rival studio, Thalia, makes Daniel nervous. The rules of The Challenge are as follows: the dancers will perform solos, after which 20 dancers will remain to perform learned choreography from Phoebe, from which the team of twelve will be picked. The Top 20 is revealed to be Michelle, Emily, Eldon, Hunter, Riley, James, Chloe, Amanda, Noah, Richelle, Thalia, Daniel, Giselle, Stephanie, Tiffany, West, Beth, Cass, Morgan and Jake. The episode ends with Phoebe teaching the Top 20 dancers the new choreography, which is much harder than most of the dancers expected.
34	4	"The Final Cut"	Frank van Keeken	Rachael Schaefer	March 14, 2014	TBA
The dancers continue to learn the choreography, which is difficult. Coming from acting classes, Stephanie arrives late, just before the auditions are to begin, and asks Tiffany for help to learn the routine. This frustrates Tiffany, as Stephanie missed the choreography and now expects her to teach Stephanie the routine. Phoebe comes in and announces that they have five minutes before auditions. When Stephanie's group performs, she does very badly at the choreography, as it is obvious that Stephanie does not know it. The rest of the dancers audition and Emily, Michelle, Kate and Phoebe discuss who should be placed on the A-Troupe. They return to announce the twelve A-Troupe dancers for the nationals team: Emily, Michelle, Riley, Eldon, James, Giselle, West, Hunter, Thalia, Chloe, Daniel and Amanda. Stephanie and Tiffany are sent down to B-Troupe, to their shock and disappointment. Stephanie accuses Emily of choosing Amanda over her, and Tiffany pleads with Kate, to no avail. Later, Michelle sees Emily and Hunter flirting and feels weird about it.
35	5	"The Girl Is Mine"	Jay Prychidny	Chloe van Keeken	March 14, 2014	TBA
Kate gives Chloe a second job at the studio, to teach the "baby ballet" class, which dismays Chloe as small children stress her out. As Chloe teaches the baby ballet class in the new dance studio, she calls West in to help her. Emily's and Hunter's scheme to break up Michelle and Eldon begins when Hunter challenges Eldon to a dance battle over Michelle. If Hunter wins, Eldon has to leave Michelle alone, but if Eldon wins then Hunter will leave them alone. Hunter and Eldon have the battle in the new studio. Eldon does well at first, but Eldon ultimately loses to Hunter meaning he has to leave Michelle alone now. Eldon is shocked that he lost the dance battle. After they both leave the studio, a smirking Amanda enters and removes her phone from the top of the piano – she has secretly recorded the entire dance battle, implying that Amanda is still scheming and might show the video to Michelle to cause trouble.
36	6	"Work It"	Mitchell Ness	Daphne Ballon	March 21, 2014	TBA
A fashion designer named Zoltan, and his assistant Minow, arrive at The Next Step to design A-Troupe's uniforms for nationals, as all teams at nationals must have studio uniforms. Zoltan presents several crazy team uniform designs, but the last design is actually good and appeals to A-Troupe. However, the price for the uniforms turns out to be $78,325.19, which too steep a price. It is decided to stage a car wash to raise money, but only $27 is raised, including a $5 tip from James' mom. Meanwhile, Stephanie and Tiffany are having a hard time being in B-Troupe, and Tiffany takes things too seriously which causes Stephanie to become irritated with her. Tiffany begins to wonder if she even belongs at The Next Step. After Zoltan gets a call that the models for his next fashion show are stuck in Milan and cannot make it, Michelle proposes that A-Troupe fill in for the models, in exchange for getting the uniforms from Zoltan for free. Zoltan agrees to the terms. A-Troupe performs in Zoltan's fashion show, which is a success, and Zoltan and Minow give them the team uniforms for nationals. Everyone "models" the new uniforms after they are delivered.
37	7	"It Takes Two"	Samir Rehem	Elizabeth Becker	March 28, 2014	TBA
A-Troupe wants Michelle and Eldon to perform the duet at nationals since they're the reason they won regionals. But Eldon opposes the idea – having lost the dance battle to Hunter, he is avoiding Michelle. James encouraging Eldon to audition for the male solo instead. Despite his earlier ankle injury, Daniel also wants to audition for soloist. Michelle asks Eldon why he backed off the duet, but Eldon brushes her off. Kate orders James to perform a duet with Beth for a competition. Hunter wants to do the duet with Michelle, but Kate begs Michelle to audition for the female solo for nationals instead, and Michelle accepts. Margie encourages Chloe to audition for female solo as well. The duet auditions include Giselle and Amanda, Thalia and West, James and Riley, and Hunter and Emily. Kate and Phoebe decide that the male soloist will be Eldon, the female soloist will be Michelle, and the duet will be given to James and Riley. The small group auditions are next. As James and Beth are practicing their routine, Beth kisses James just as Riley enters. Riley breaks into tears and runs away – in confessional, she questions her relationship with James.
38	8	"What'll I Do"	Samir Rehem	Chloe van Keeken	April 4, 2014	TBA
Riley tells Emily about James' and Beth's kiss, and Emily advises Riley to speak to James to fully understand the situation. James enters, and Riley asks him if anything happened with Beth. To James the kiss did not mean anything, so he lies, saying that everything went fine in his rehearsal with Beth. Riley knows James is lying, and angrily leaves. James tells Beth that he will not compete with her for Riley's sake. Kate announces the group auditions for nationals – the groups are: Giselle, Thalia and Amanda; and Chloe, Daniel and Hunter. The former threesome wins the group performance. Daniel is angry that he will not be a featured dancer at nationals now. Later, James performs a dance for Riley, saying that he only wants to be with her. Riley is happy and about to forgive him, but Beth enters, which forces Riley to remember everything that upset her in the first place – she breaks up with James before leaving. James tells Beth that he will now do the duet competition, since Riley left him. Riley dances her and James' duet alone in Studio A, imagining James is doing it with her, which only upsets her further.
39	9	"Never Enough"	Samir Rehem	Rachael Schaefer	April 11, 2014	TBA
James and Beth place second in their duets competition. Riley cannot believe that James still competed with Beth, causing Riley to feel that James has betrayed her again. Riley and James refuse to practice their duet together. Kate questions them and they say they need time to work it out. Michelle sees Emily and Hunter goofing around in Culture Shock (formerly Squeezed) and thinks it is "weird". Riley congratulates James on his competition result, and begins to realise that although she is still mad at James, she almost misses him. Michelle talks to Hunter about Eldon avoiding her, and although Hunter knows why Eldon is avoiding her, he offers Michelle encouraging advice. This causes Michelle to remember how much she used to like Hunter. Michelle finally confronts Eldon, but he lies, saying that he cannot date her and focus on his solo for Nationals at the same time. Eldon breaks up with Michelle. Emily overhears the entire conversation.
40	10	"I Hope I Get It"	Samir Rehem	Rachael Schaefer and Alejandro Alcoba & Carling Tedesco	April 18, 2014	TBA
J-Troupe's dancers discover that since The Next Step has gained popularity by winning regionals, they will have to re-audition to keep their spots in J-Troupe. Becca, the sister of J-Troupe member Gabi, is there to audition, and Gabi feels threatened. Emily and Hunter run the J-Troupe auditions, and pretend to really enjoy themselves so that they can make Michelle, who is observing, jealous. Michelle asks Eldon if they can still be friends and Eldon reluctantly agrees. Michelle is remembering feelings she used to have for Hunter. Richelle from J-Troupe comes up with a scheme for the current J-Troupers to keep their spots, and tries it out on Kate, but Kate tells Richelle that she needs to work on her bargaining skills, and walks away smiling. Richelle and Gabi retain their spots in J-Troupe. Everyone thinks that Richelle was the reason they kept the spots, but she really was not. Later, Michelle and Hunter perform their old duet together, and Hunter reveals he still loves Michelle, but Michelle runs away saying she can't – she still misses Eldon.
41	11	"Anything You Can Do, I Can Do Better"	Samir Rehem	Alejandro Alcoba and Carling Tedesco	April 25, 2014	TBA
Daniel asks Kate for a re-match audition for the solo since now his ankle is more healed, but Kate refuses. Michelle and Amanda are handing out flyers at Michelle's high school, and Tess from Elite shows up and makes fun of The Next Step and Amanda, saying Amanda should come back to Elite. Michelle confronts Tess, telling her to leave Amanda alone since she's happy at the Next Step and doesn't want to return to Elite. It is revealed that the flyer that Tess took from Amanda reads "East Hall at 4:00". Emily, Giselle, and James mentor some talented J-Troupe members to be more like them. Daniel tells Kate that if she doesn't give him the solo, he will leave The Next Step, because Chris offered him the nationals solo at Superstar Dance Academy. Kate still refuses to give him the solo, so Daniel leaves. Later, Amanda and Tess meet at the school. In confessional, Amanda admits that her joining A-Troupe was all a plan to tear The Next Step apart, and to make sure that they do not make it to Nationals. In fact, Amanda is still at Elite and she is still dance captain there.
42	12	"Time to Move On"	Shawn Thompson	Chloe van Keeken	May 2, 2014	TBA
Riley and James continue having difficulty rehearsing their duet. This worries Miss Kate, as their chemistry is gone. At Culture Shock open mic night, Thalia performs a funny stand-up act. While there, Emily tells Riley that she should get over James and move on. Later, Emily and Hunter accidentally get locked in the music room's closet, as the door is broken. Hunter tells funny stories to Emily, and they try on costumes and dance together. Emily falls on top of Hunter, leading to a "moment" between them. Riley finds out that James and Beth are on a date, so Michelle, Amanda and Stephanie set Riley up with Charlie from B-Troupe. Charlie asks her out, though Riley declines. Later, Riley is at the studio to practice the duet, but James fails to show up as he is jealous about Charlie. James does not answer Riley's phonecalls because he's on a date with Beth. Riley gives up on waiting and goes on a date with Charlie. Michelle gets Hunter's SOS text and frees Hunter and Emily from the closet. In confessional, Emily says she worked with Hunter to get Eldon back, but admits she is thinking about Hunter now, not Eldon.
43	13	"The Truth Comes Out"	Shawn Thompson	Rachael Schaefer	May 9, 2014	TBA
In Culture Shock, Amanda shows Michelle pictures on her phone, having planned for Michelle to "discover" the dance battle video. Michelle watches the video and becomes angry – she now knows why Eldon broke up with her. She confronts Eldon who refuses to talk about it. Michelle then talks to Emily, who confesses she doesn't want Eldon back. Michelle shows the video to Kate, who shows it to all of A-Troupe, embarrassing Eldon. They agree to hold a new vote for the male soloist – Hunter or Eldon. Emily, Amanda, Riley, Thalia and Hunter vote for Hunter – meaning Eldon gets to keep his solo. But then Michelle also raises her hand, leaving Hunter with 6 votes, enough to replace Eldon as soloist. James is angry that Riley and Michelle wouldn't vote for Eldon. Amanda believes her plan to tear The Next Step apart is working. Hunter thanks Michelle, and Emily realises that their plan is working in Hunter's favour. Phoebe gives James, Noah and Camille 24 hours to create a song, and Giselle, Chloe and Becca to choreograph a dance to go with it. They perform it, and everyone is entertained, except Eldon who is upset that he lost his solo.
44	14	"Sing"	Shawn Thompson	Chloe van Keeken	May 16, 2014	TBA
James and Beth are now dating – James thought it would be "10% annoying and 90% fun" and instead it is "10% fun and 100% annoying". Michelle and Chloe hold a fundraiser for a scholarship at The Next Step. James and Noah intend to perform, but Noah refuses to sing because of his voice changing. Beth and Thalia audition and are rejected, but Amanda sings well and is chosen. West and Giselle hold a series of competitive contests to determine the "winner", and they perform a ventriloquist act at the fundraiser. Eldon raises a dollar per pirouette he does, getting to eleven. Amanda is told by Lucien that Elite is entered in another regionals competition. With Amanda performing, Elite wins, so they will be going to nationals. James and Noah need a replacement for the missing Amanda, so Noah sings. Riley comes to see Charlie perform, but is really there to see James. James sees Riley with Charlie, and is sad. Later, James questions Amanda on why she failed to show up, but Amanda lies. Kate then tells them that Elite will be at nationals after all – Amanda pleads ignorance. In confessional, Amanda is ready to take down The Next Step.
45	15	"You're the One That I Want"	Samir Rehem	Rachael Schaefer	May 23, 2014	TBA
Hunter asks Michelle on a date to a concert and she agrees. Eldon sees this and feels down. Giselle and Thalia plan to challenge James and Riley's duet in the hopes that competition will force them to get it together. Emily has finally admitted her feelings for Hunter to herself – now she has to tell him. Emily asks Hunter to go see the same concert, but he and Michelle are already going. Thalia and Giselle explain their plan to Kate, who is very skeptical, but gives it a chance anyway. James and Eldon go for a walk to calm down from all the drama with Riley and Michelle. Eldon confesses that he misses hanging out with Michelle. After their date, Michelle and Hunter are talking in Culture Shock, but Michelle keeps mentioning Eldon. Hunter realises he and Michelle aren't going to work. At the studio, Giselle and Thalia perform for the duet at nationals. Afterwards, Riley declares that Thalia and Giselle can have the duet, and walks away. Hunter is practicing his nationals solo, when Emily enters and inquires about his date with Michelle. Hunter confesses that he could only think about Emily – Hunter kisses Emily which Michelle witnesses.
46	16	"Hazy Shade of Winter"	Samir Rehem	Frank van Keeken	May 30, 2014	TBA
Michelle enters Culture Shock and tells Emily that she witnessed Emily and Hunter kiss. Michelle believes Emily is disrespecting their "history", but Emily is shocked as Michelle did the same thing to her with Eldon. Michelle realises that Emily is right – if not for her relationship with Eldon, none of this drama would have happened. Michelle is unsure about how she feels about dance and The Next Step now. She turns to Eldon, who advises her that "it always comes back to dance", and that she has to decide. Hunter and Emily finally talk about the kiss and their mutual feelings. After Emily tells Hunter that Michelle saw them kiss, he rushes off to speak to Michelle, leaving Emily concerned. Giselle and Thalia tell James and Riley that their duet challenge was insincere – but neither Riley nor James want the duet back. Kate declares that Thalia and Giselle will just have work at the duet. Riley and James go for a walk because James wants to talk. Hunter tells Michelle that he wants to be with Emily. In confessional, Michelle admits that The Next Step does not feel like her family anymore, and thinks it is time to move on.
47	17	"Game On"	Samir Rehem	Frank van Keeken	June 6, 2014	TBA
Kate announces that Michelle has left The Next Step, so Emily is the sole dance captain again. At the mall, Emily discovers that Amanda is still at Elite. She informs Riley who is shocked. Kate declares that new auditions for the female solo are needed now. Amanda will audition. Knowing Amanda is still at Elite, Riley also volunteers for the solo. Riley and Emily plan to demonstrate that Amanda is a double-agent. But Kate thinks Amanda is great, and she will not do anything without proof. Emily's plan is to get A-Troupe hating her again, so Amanda will trust Emily enough to join her in taking down The Next Step – Emily can then reveal Amanda's true motives. James sees Riley practicing her solo, but Riley tells him not to come to the audition as it will stress her out. As part of the plan, Emily belittles Riley during her audition routine, and everyone becomes angry at Emily. In confessional, Amanda admits that she is secretly loving this, as the team is bringing itself down on its own. Kate strips Emily's dance captaincy. Later, James pledges to win Riley back. Kate names Amanda dance captain.
Part 2
48	18	"Make a Plan to Love Me"	Frank van Keeken	Frank van Keeken	September 12, 2014	TBA
Emily is in the music room and Amanda enters. Emily informs Amanda that she knows about Amanda's plans against The Next Step – Emily will keep quiet if Amanda lets Emily join her. Everyone attempts to get Michelle back, but Michelle is happy not being at The Next Step. James comes up with a plan to prove his love for Riley – James wants Riley to create a list of things she wants James to complete. First on the list: break up with Beth. James tries to break up with Beth, but she just doesn't understand. Amanda confesses that she still doesn't trust Emily – Emily needs to prove her loyalty. James admits to Riley that it is hard to break up with Beth, and continues to the second list-item, which is to read Riley's diary in public at Culture Shock. Michelle enters for a meeting with Kate, but sees all of A-Troupe there and exits, unseen. Amanda sees Emily with Hunter, and has an idea. Riley praises James' diary reading, and he is happy. James informs her that he read the whole diary, including a years-earlier entry about a "really cute boy" – Riley smiles, denying it was about James.
49	19	"Sacrifice"	Frank van Keeken	Alejandro Alcoba	September 19, 2014	TBA
Emily encourages Hunter to try to bond with "the boys". James is working on number 11 on Riley's list – creating a dance move named after Riley. Hunter takes Emily's advice, and approaches James, West and Eldon, in order to become their friends. But Hunter ruined Eldon's relationship with Michelle and took Eldon's nationals solo away. West quickly forgives Hunter after Hunter's promises to teach West his head-slide move. Eldon is intrigued by Hunter's offer to bake him the best chocolate cake ever. Michelle visits dancers from A-Troupe at Culture Shock. She is initially relieved, but Michelle's emotions change when she discovers that Amanda has already filled her nationals female solo spot. Hunter wants to help James break up with Beth so that they can become "bros". In Studio A, James presents his number 11 dance move to Riley –the Riley Roll-Up, named for Riley rolls up her shorts. Eldon accepts Hunter's chocolate cake, but smashes it into Hunter's face as a prank. Eldon also wants his solo back and requests another dance battle for it – Hunter accepts. Amanda sees Emily and Hunter together, and determines what Emily needs to – Amanda wants Emily to prove herself by dumping Hunter.
50	20	"Heartbreaker"	Patrick Sisam	Daphne Ballon	September 26, 2014	TBA
Thalia keeps attempting to get Michelle to re-join the Next Step but Michelle is refusing as she likes being in high school. Hunter and Eldon are to battle for the male solo spot. James tries to find a four-leaf clover because it is on the list that Riley assigned to James. James asks others to help him, telling them that if they find it they will win a prize. James gets the four-leaf clover from Beth who tells James that she knows he loves Riley more, but just wants him to be happy. James gives Riley the four-leaf clover at Culture Shock when Chloe arrives to give James another four-leaf clover and claim her prize but learns he already has one and walks away disappointed. Amanda tells Emily that if she wants to be trusted, she needs to break up with Hunter after the dance battle. Eldon wins his solo back in the dance battle. Emily coldly breaks up with Hunter.
51	21	"Hello Trouble"	Patrick Sisam	Rachael Schaefer	October 3, 2014	TBA
Giselle, Thalia and Amanda go to a trios competition to represent The Next Step. James intends to complete Riley's task that scares him the most, which is number 10 – James must talk to Emily and find out one thing about Emily that Riley doesn't know. James buys smoothies for himself and Emily, but Emily leaves when James' attention is elsewhere. As James tracks down Emily, the costumes for nationals arrive, and the two of them put them in the costume closet. Emily lowers her guard and she and James begin to talk. At the trios completion, Lucien is speaking with a French accent, and Kate hates it. Lucien instructs Amanda to throw the competition and quit The Next Step so that they lose, and Tess and Elite win. But Michelle arrives causing everyone to wonder what she is doing here, and Amanda is concerned. Lucien gives Amanda the sign to not throw the competition, because of Michelle's unexpected presence there. The Next Step trio take second, beating Elite who place third, but losing to Life of Dance. James and Emily bond, which shocks Riley a little.
52	22	"Lost"	Patrick Sisam	Chloe van Keeken	October 10, 2014	TBA
James attempts number 8 on Riley's list which is to solve a riddle where Eldon, West and Hunter each represent parts of the riddle and James represents the boat in which they must travel – James has to figure out how to bring each, one at a time, across a "river". Amanda decides to work with Emily to sabotage the studio by hiding their nationals costumes and prevent them from performing. Emily suggests hiding them in the dumpster, intending to quickly return them when the time is right. Amanda says that they first have to steal a key which saddens Emily. Phoebe is in Kate's office but that does not stop Amanda from stealing the key. Kate goes to the music room closet to retrieve the costumes but realises they are not there. She instructs A-Troupe to perform a search for them throughout the studio. West, channeling a "raccoon", finds them in the garbage, after Emily subtly suggests raccoons like garbage. West's success gets Amanda curious so she questions him, and he answers that it's "his raccoon" way. Kate decides to keep the costumes at her house until nationals. James solves Riley's riddle.
53	23	"Better Than This"	Frank van Keeken	Rachael Schaefer	October 17, 2014	TBA
Amanda again questions West on how he found the costumes in the garbage, and West responds that was channeling his inner "raccoon". Amanda asks if Emily helped him, and West does not remember but he thinks so. Amanda now knows that Emily cannot be trusted. James is determined to complete Riley's list to win her back. Number 9 is to earn his driver's license. So James attends a driving class. But James' driving instructor, Arthur, is both tough and eccentric, and seems to dislike James! Michelle is trying to find a new activity, and seems to find it in Debate Club. Thalia goes to watch Michelle debate, and realises Michelle is happy with debating. Michelle will be competing that night. During the driving test, Arthur gives James a hard time, until James starts singing along with Arthur's "original" song. Michelle debates in the competition, and A-Troupe attend to cheer her on. Michelle is shocked and happy to see this. But even with missing her old friends, Michelle still chooses debate over returning to dance. Having passed his driving test, James and Arthur prank Riley and James' mom into thinking he failed. James crosses number 9 off of Riley's list.
54	24	"Under Pressure"	Brad Hruboska	Chloe van Keeken and Rachael Schaefer	October 24, 2014	TBA
Kate informs A-Troupe that someone needs to be CPR-certified for nationals. Riley volunteers James, but James will only do it if Riley does it too. They go to the CPR class together. The instructor is very strict – he partners James with an elderly woman, and Riley with an attractive younger man. James doesn't like that. When James does the CPR on his partner, the elderly woman pulls him down and kisses him. At The Next Step, Amanda conspires with Emily to steal the money for regionals. Kate realises the money is missing, so she interrogates Chloe, since Chloe has the key. Chloe denies taking it. Having framed Amanda for the crime, Emily speaks up and accuses Amanda, suggesting Kate check Amanda's bag. Kate checks Amanda's bag but the money is not there. Amanda then tells Kate to check Emily's bag, where Kate finds the key and the missing money. Amanda has framed Emily instead! Kate puts Emily on suspension, and Emily may be permanently kicked out of the studio. Emily sends Riley a SNS text, for "Sister needs Sister". Riley arrives, and Emily tells Riley what has happened – Riley says she needs to do something about it.
55	25	"Just Dance"	Kim Derko	Chloe van Keeken	November 7, 2014	TBA
Emily is still suffering from Amanda framing her for stealing money from The Next Step. Riley tries to come up with a plan to prove that Amanda is still with Elite. In Culture Shock, Chloe and Riley notice Stephanie and Amanda buying juices, and Chloe sees Amanda pay with the $5 bill that Margie had drawn on the day before – Chloe remembers this being with the studio's money for nationals. This proves that Amanda, not Emily, stole the money. Riley and Chloe show Kate, and everyone confronts Amanda. Amanda admits her guilt, and leaves the studio to return to Elite, declaring that now The Next Step does not have enough dancers to compete at nationals. Meanwhile, James has to complete one last item on Riley's list, which Riley has just added: get Michelle to return to The Next Step! James convinces Michelle to come to the mall with him. But James has organized a huge flash mob with hundreds of people to convince Michelle to return. Impressed by the effort, Michelle agrees to return at The Next Step. Back together, James and Riley kiss.
56	26	"Water It"	Derby Crewe	Chloe van Keeken	November 14, 2014	TBA
Thalia and Giselle return the duet to James and Riley, because they are back together. Kate asks Michelle if she still wants the solo, and Michelle says no, but Kate convinces Michelle to take the solo back. West and Emily are having fun together impersonating Thalia and Giselle in conversion. Riley and James are having a surprisingly hard time practicing their duet together. Michelle is practicing her solo in studio A, and Eldon enters. He asks Michelle to perform her solo for him, giving her helpful tips on her choreography. Michelle feels more at home at The Next Step again. Riley talks to Emily about how she is not sure about her and James because their duet is not working. Emily suggests that Riley give James a gift, because of all the work he did on her list. Riley surprises James at the park, and sets up a picnic for him, including shwarma, like on their first date. Michelle and Eldon spend the whole day helping each other on their solos, and afterwards go to Culture Shock to get juices. Riley and James say a toast to each other, and kiss and slow-dance on their date.
57	27	"Run This Town"	Shawn Thompson	Rachael Schaefer	November 21, 2014	TBA
Miss Kate decides to give the small group routine to the boys in the aftermath of Amanda's betrayal and return to Elite Dance Academy. The boys are horsing around and when Miss Kate asks to see their routine, but they can only produce a starting pose. They need help with the routine. Kate invites choreographer Luther Brown to visit the studio to assist in choreographing the boys' routine. Thalia and Giselle catch up with Michelle, but whenever Michelle talks about something other than dance, Thalia and Giselle act strangely. Michelle asks what's wrong, and they admit that they are afraid she will leave again. Michelle insists that she would never leave again as she is with her real family. Thalia and Giselle then help Michelle with A-Troupe's nationals routine. James gives Eldon advice about dating, insisting that Eldon needs to be able to do 30 pirouettes before he is ready to date a girl. With Luther Brown's help, the boys choreograph a great hip-hop routine for nationals. Everyone dances together.
58	28	"Re-Match"	Mitchell Ness	Chloe van Keeken	November 28, 2014	TBA
The Next Step arrive at nationals. As they are waiting to register, Life Of Dance, the reigning nationals champions, enter the venue. Life of Dance, aka. "Ladies of Destruction", are The Next Step's biggest competition, even more so than Elite. After registering, the team is told that they can complete in a scavenger hunt in order to be able to attend a Shawn Desman concert that evening. Emily is a massive Shawn Desman fan, so she, West, and Giselle volunteer to do the scavenger hunt. They keep coming across Amanda and Tess from Elite during the hunt. Nationals competition begins with day one of male solos, including Max of Elite. As part of the final part of the scavenger hunt, they must get a picture with Shawn Desman, but arrive to find a long line to meet him. West comes up with a plan to pretend to be a celebrity named "Compass", so that they can skip the line and see Shawn Desman and also take a picture with him. West's plan succeeds, and The Next Step all attend the Shawn Desman concert with many of the other dancers competing at nationals, and everyone dances and has fun.
59	29	"Old Friends"	Mitchell Ness	Frank van Keeken	December 4, 2014	TBA
Eldon is to face off against Daniel in male solo round at nationals. Daniel's competitiveness gets in the way of his friendships with A-Troupe members, even Giselle, giving them the cold shoulder before he performs his solo. In the competition, Eldon beats Daniel, eliminating Daniel and his studio. At a party afterward, Daniel apologizes to Giselle for his earlier competitive behavior. He is asked to audition for Juilliard by a Juilliard representative, who was impressed by Daniel's performance despite his loss, and Giselle happily congratulates him.
60	30	"I Don't Know"	Mitchell Ness	Frank van Keeken	December 12, 2014	TBA
Having advanced to the next round of nationals, the boys are to perform their small group routine in competition. James still has not decided whether or not to include the B-Twist move in their routine, after Luther Brown told James he wasn't ready yet. The boys perform their small groups routine, and James ultimately decides not to do the B-Twist. He feels bad about this, and in confessional worries that The Next Step might be eliminated as a result, as the small group competition is fierce. The boys win their small group round, and The Next Step advances. Riley and James are to perform their duet in the next round. After their earlier difficulties with the duet, Riley and James revised their routine to tell a story about a man (James) who is all about business sitting in an art museum, when an art piece (Riley) comes alive to show him her world. The new routine is a better balance of hip-hop and ballet. Just before performing, Riley tells James to do the B-twist, which he does and he lands it. They win the duet round, and James and Riley kiss, with Riley telling James that she loves him.
61	31	"What You Waiting For?"	Mitchell Ness	Frank van Keeken	December 19, 2014	TBA
Michelle and Amanda are paired together for the female solos round, and Amanda is nervous. The girls from A-Troupe decide to go shopping at the mall to relax. Lucien orders Tess to follow them, and to make sure that Michelle does not come back in time for her solo. Tess follows Michelle into a store and plants a perfume bottle in her bag – Michelle is framed for shoplifting and detained by mall security. At nationals, A-Troupe is frantically looking for Michelle but cannot find her. Kate orders Chloe to go back to the mall to locate Michelle, and informs Riley to prepare the solo that she earlier auditioned with after Michelle had left The Next Step. Amanda is angry at Lucien and Tess for sabotaging Michelle, as she wants to beat Michelle fair and square. The mall security guards finally look at the security tape, and verify that Michelle was framed. Michelle hurriedly leaves, and she and Chloe race back to the venue. Amanda gives a lovely solos performance. Michelle returns in the nick of time, and performs her solo routine with energy. Michelle beats Amanda – Elite is eliminated, and The Next Step advances to the semifinals.
62	32	"You Love Me"	Mitchell Ness	Frank van Keeken	December 26, 2014	TBA
The Next Step has advanced to the semifinals at nationals, but are extremely nervous to perform because of all the talented troupes. During a rehearsal, Thalia and Eldon look for a "sweet spot" on stage, somewhere where the energy feels right. West informs Emily that they should date. CDC, the studio facing Life of Dance in the semis, puts in a creative performance, but are beaten by Life of Dance's vast technical mastery. The Next Step is up against Joanne Chapman Studio, the previous year's runners-up, who perform first with a romantic-gothic routine. The Next Step perform a lively routine about troupe's spirit of teamwork. At the very end of the routine, Emily lands wrong injuring her knee, and quickly hustles off stage at its conclusion. While waiting for the announcement of the winner, several dancers rush backstage to check on Emily, who informs them she will not be able to dance. The Next Step wins, advancing to face Life of Dance in the finals at nationals. But with Emily's injury, they do not have the required 10 dancers necessary to compete.
63	33	"Rewind"	Frank van Keeken	Frank van Keeken	March 13, 2015 (Note: The episode "Rewind" was broadcast out of order, but chronologically it belongs between "You Love Me" and "What Dreamers Do".)	TBA
Emily's knee injury looks bad. Kate, and Eldon and Hunter, go looking for the tournament physiotherapist. Meanwhile, individual awards are handed out before the nationals final. Rocco of Life of Dance takes second in the male soloist category. In the female soloist category, Amanda, despite having lost her round to Michelle takes third place. Lexi of Life of Dance places second, and Michelle is named top female soloist for the second year in a row. In the duets category, Riley and James take second place to Life of Dance's duo. West, and then Eldon and Hunter, show up late for the small groups award, leaving James alone on stage for a time – but the foursome end up winning the small groups category, beating Life of Dance and Elite. The physiotherapist declares that Emily cannot dance, and Kate is just about to forfeit the finals to Life of Dance when Amanda appears and declares that she will perform for The Next Step as one of their registered alternates.
64	34	"What Dreamers Do" "Danger Zone"	Frank van Keeken	Frank van Keeken	January 2, 2015	TBA
The Next Step are about to forfeit, due to Emily's injury, when Amanda enters and announces that she will dance with The Next Step, as Kate had submitted her name on the team list for nationals. The Life of Dance captain objects, believing it is against the rules for a dancer to perform with two different teams. After official discussions, the nationals manager declares that Amanda will be allowed to dance. Life of Dance performs a precise and technical routine with a concept about a paparazzo and modeling. West encourages the team by telling them "I love you." The Next Step perform a lively and acrobatic routine with a circus theme. The judges come to the stage, and The Next Step are crowned the champions, and will be going to internationals! The team is overjoyed, and Emily and West, and Riley and James, kiss. Back home, Kate, Giselle, and Chloe return to the studio to find an eviction notice on the door. Later, Kate and the dancers are packing up the studio, when Lucien enters to offer them a deal – he has a studio for them, but in return, he wants The Next Step and Elite to merge into one team for internationals.

=== Season 3 (2015) ===
No. overall	No. in season	Title	Directed by	Written by	Original Can. air date	Original UK air date
Part 1
65	1	"Coming Home?"	Samir Rehem	Frank van Keeken	March 16, 2015	TBA
A-Troupe is reunited after their Nationals win, but the celebrations are short lived. Michelle is distracted because her parents are divorcing and her mom is moving back to Madison, and Emily is still recovering from her knee injury at nationals. Kate and Phoebe try to rent other venues for their studio but fail to find anything. Meanwhile, James helps plan his aunt's wedding, and brings along Riley. Phoebe tells Kate that they have no choice but to ask Lucien for his terms, and potentially merge The Next Step with Elite.
66	2	"Game, Set, and Match"	Samir Rehem	Elizabeth Becker	March 16, 2015	TBA
Kate informs the dancers that Lucien has bought the building and is insisting that they merge with Elite. Lucien's terms are that they put the names of 12 dancers from each company into a hat, and every pair of names pulled out must battle for a spot on the internationals team, even if the two are from the same studio. Secretly, control of The Next Step is at stake. Eldon is horrified at possibility having to compete against one of his own teammates, and leaves A-Troupe. Kate offers Noah a spot to compete for the internationals team. Lucien meets up with Daniel and tells him he has the opportunity to join a team going to internationals if he does everything Lucien says. Thalia and then James try to get Eldon back, but fail. Michelle is having difficulty trusting Amanda, but she spies Amanda talking to her former assistant captains at Elite and overhears Amanda saying that she's with The Next Step now. Daniel visits The Next Step and declares he's with Elite now. James knows that this news will get Eldon to return, and Eldon rushes back to the studio. The team is now ready to take on Elite.
67	3	"Secrets"	Shawn Thompson	Chloe van Keeken	March 17, 2015	TBA
Emily learns that she will not be able to dance for at least eight months to a year. She confesses her injury status to Stephanie, but swears Stephanie to secrecy. Not wanting Emily to risk her dance career, Stephanie meets Riley in Hidalgos (formerly Culture Shock) and tells Riley that Emily is still unable to dance. Stephanie urges her to talk sense into Emily. Riley confronts Emily who continues to plan to audition. Riley tells Miss Kate and A-Troupe that Emily is not recovered enough for dance, and Kate removes Emily from the team. Emily is heartbroken, and angry at Riley and Stephanie. Emily gives her spot to Richelle from J-Troupe. Afterwards, Michelle, Miss Kate and Lucien are in the office, and Michelle informs Miss Kate that she cannot audition for a place on the internationals team because of her ongoing family difficulties. Lucien agrees to place Michelle on the nationals team without an audition, as Michelle is Miss National Soloist, but at a price – Michelle will be counted as an Elite "win", meaning Lucien is already up 1–0 on Kate and The Next Step for control of the studio.
68	4	"Let the Games Begin"	Shawn Alex Thompson	Tricia Fish & Emma Campbell	March 18, 2015	TBA
The dancers compete in pairs for a spot on the internationals team. Hunter goes first, and picks Eldon's name, which hurts Eldon as the two are friends now. They have to audition against each other and though Hunter puts in a surprisingly good performance, Eldon wins, which means Hunter is off the team. Next, Noah has to compete against his crush, Elite dancer Abi – Abi is nervous and make mistakes, while Noah is flawless. Noah wins, and the score is 2–1 for The Next Step. Sisters and Elite dancers Skylar and Cierra have to battle for a spot – older sister Cierra wins. West defeats a very nervous Elite dancer named Shannon. J-Trouper Richelle loses to Max from Elite – she is still too young, and Max is too powerful. Daniel and Lucien conspire to have two Next Step dancers compete against each other – when James' name is called, Lucien creates a diversion allowing Tess and Daniel to switch the names in the hat. When James picks a name from the hat, it is Riley's name. Riley is heartbroken to discover that she will have to compete against James for a place on the internationals team.
69	5	"The Fallout"	Chloe van Keeken	Rachael Schaefer	March 19, 2015	TBA
James and Riley are practicing their solos for their face-off for a spot on the internationals team. Riley confesses to James that she would prefer not to go to internationals, rather than compete against him. James convinces her to dance full-out, for the team, and he promises to do the same. Having returned to the studio, Riley dances her solo full-out, and puts in a good routine. But when James gets up to do his solo, he realises that Riley deserves to have the spot over him and that his competing against her will cause problems in their relationship, so he walks out and forfeits. Riley is shocked and angry that James did not keep his promise to her. The boys say goodbye to Hunter. Several Elite dancers, including Cierra's sister Skylar, join B-Troupe at The Next Step. After discussing it with Eldon, Riley realises that James forfeited as the best way forward in a bad situation, and that he forfeited because he loves her. Riley finds James drumming in the music room, and she tells him that she loves him and she knows why he did what he did.
70	6	"The Times They Are a Changin'"	Shawn Alex Thompson	Chloe van Keeken	March 20, 2015	TBA
The Next Step leads the internationals team competition 4–3. Shantel, one of the assistant captains at Elite, defeats Elite dancer Mackenzie. Chloe defends her place on the internationals team against Elite dancer Jen by beating her. Thalia defeats Elite dancer Nick to stay on the team. In the pivotal showdown, assistant captain Tess from Elite and former Elite captain Amanda go head-to-head. Both put in strong performances, but Amanda is deemed the winner, and Tess runs out of the studio upon losing. Amanda is the seventh dancer to win for The Next Step, meaning that ownership of The Next Step is decided in Kate's favor, and Lucien loses his gambit for control. In the final face-off, Giselle faces a familiar opponent in her battle when she goes up against Daniel, now with Elite. Again, both put in strong performances, but Giselle is deemed the winner. The Next Step wins the competition 8–4. Before leaving The Next Step, Emily gives Richelle the studio's dance captain dairy, as Emily thinks Richelle is future dance captain material.
71	7	"Your New Beginning"	Samir Rehem	Amy Cole	March 23, 2015	TBA
The new Elite members, Shantel, Cierra and Max, are having a hard time adjusting to life in A-Troupe, as is as former J-Trouper Noah. James plans a surprise for Riley, when she gets her braces off – he gives her a piece of corn on the cob. Eldon observes this, and assumes it must be a romantic gesture, and so gives Thalia a corn on the cob as well. Thalia doesn't get it. Phoebe assigns duets to the former Elite members and three Next Step dancers – Shantel is paired with Giselle, Max is paired with West, and Noah and Cierra are paired. The pairs have to work on a duet routine, in order to bond with one another as teammates. Max and West are totally in synch, and Noah and Cierra discover they have a lot in common. But Shantel is determined to have her own way, and irritates Giselle – in the end, Shantel refuses to perform, declaring the routine too "messy", leaving Giselle to do the duet alone, and they fail the exercise, with Shantel making an enemy of Giselle.
72	8	"I'm Your Captain"	Samir Rehem	Chloe van Keeken	March 24, 2015	TBA
Michelle resigns as dance captain, as she cannot fully commit to the team right now, with her parents divorcing. Kate chooses Giselle to be the new captain, but Shantel objects to not having a competition for captain. Shantel challenges Giselle, feeling that she is the better leader. Each is to choreograph a routine for a trio of dancers – whoever choreographs the better routine will be the new dance captain. Shantel is assigned a contemporary dance with Noah, Thalia, and West volunteering; Giselle is assigned a hip-hop dance with Max, Eldon, and non-hip-hop dancer Chloe. Giselle struggles to take control of her group, and asks Michelle for advice on how to be a good dance captain. James needs to find a suit for Aunt Kathy's wedding in his Uncle Enzo's warehouse. It is going terribly, so Riley arrives to help him out. After getting Michelle's advice, Giselle takes control and choreographs a superior hip-hop routine. Giselle wins the trio challenge, over Shantel's "safe" routine, and Michelle names her the new dance captain. Outraged at losing, Shantel storms out and leaves A-Troupe, declaring that she does not want to be on a team that does not recognize her talent.
73	9	"The Nutcracker Prince"	Samir Rehem	Elizabeth Becker	March 25, 2015	TBA
After West "corrects" Eldon when Eldon is practicing ballet, Eldon challenges West to audition for The Nutcracker with Le Ballet de la Reine touring company. Chloe attempts to teach West, who is completely untrained, basic ballet, with Noah's and Abi's assistance. Chloe and West audition together, for moral support, with the company. West and Chloe make it through several cuts, advancing to the final audition for the company. Both do well. Later, West gets a letter from the ballet company, and opens it in Eldon's presence, intending to one-up Eldon, but West discovers he did not get into the company. Giselle is perplexed with, and impressed by, Max. With Shantel having left, there is one more spot in A-Troupe, and James is offered his old spot back. James does not accept right away, being conflicted as he is very committed to his band now. James ultimately announces that he is rejoining A-Troupe and everyone is thrilled. West informs Chloe that letter indicated that she has been offered a position with the ballet company, so Chloe now has a big decision to make – complete at Internationals, or leave The Next Step and do The Nutcracker ballet.
74	10	"Can't Fight This Feeling"	Samir Rehem	Rachael Schaefer	March 26, 2015	TBA
Thalia is developing feelings for Eldon, but wonders if he and Michelle are really over each other. Richelle is bothered by Noah's crush on Abi, because she likes Noah. Thalia talks to Michelle about Eldon, and Michelle admits that she is pretty close with Eldon. Thalia then quizzes Eldon about Michelle, suggesting that he and Michelle seem to have chemistry, to which an oblivious Eldon agrees. This bothers Thalia, and she hurries off. Michelle believes Thalia asked her about Eldon because Eldon might still like her, so Michelle confronts Eldon, who declares he is not interested in her. Michelle then realizes that Thalia was actually asking because Thalia likes Eldon. Michelle informs Thalia that she and Eldon are not getting back together, and that she is totally fine with Thalia being with Eldon. Thalia goes to see Eldon, and watches him do a freestyle solo dance. When he finishes, they both admit that they really like each other and hold hands. Chloe still has no idea what to do about the decision she has to make – West tells her to follow her dream, but Chloe does not want to let the team down.
75	11	"Marry Me"	Frank van Keeken	Frank van Keeken	March 27, 2015	TBA
James finally meets his Aunt Kathy's fiance, and discovers that it is Arthur, James' eccentric driving instructor from "Better Than This". Riley is kind of scared of Arthur, and James declares Arthur to be "beyond weird". Thalia helps Eldon teach the J-Troupe acro class, and they grow closer when they perform a duet for J-Troupe. Michelle is having a lot of trouble adjusting to her parents' divorce, which includes failing to show up for a practice with Cierra, and tells Chloe that she believes her parents' breakup may be all her fault. Aunt Kathy's wedding preparations are not going well, as Arthur has no best man and the band cannot make it. James offers to be Arthur's best man, and have his band, Lost & Found, perform for the wedding reception. Ultimately, the wedding is a success, and James and Riley enjoy themselves.
76	12	"Do the Right Thing"	Frank van Keeken	Rachael Schaefer	March 30, 2015	TBA
Chloe is still conflicted about her big decision. Thalia asks Eldon to go to a concert with her, but Eldon makes up weird excuses not to go – as per James' earlier advice, Eldon believes he must complete 30 pirouettes before he can date anyone. Chloe is about to inform Miss Kate of her decision, when Miss Kate admits that she would be lost without Chloe. Thalia confronts Eldon about turning down the concert, so Eldon takes Thalia to James, who explains the "30 pirouettes before dating" rule. West advises Chloe she will be letting down The Next Step if she does not accept the ballet company position. West helps Eldon, but Eldon is nowhere near 30 pirouettes. Chloe finally decides, and informs Miss Kate that she will accept the ballet company offer. Miss Kate is very proud of Chloe, and admits that she will miss Chloe a lot. Thalia sees an exhausted Eldon on the floor, and encourages him, and they start doing pirouettes together. Chloe is dancing in Studio A one final time, and Margie appears. They dance together. Margie waves goodbye and disappears in glimmer of lights, implying that Margie has been an angel all along.
77	13	"Put You First"	Patrick Sisam	Emma Campbell	March 31, 2015	TBA
James has forgotten his anniversary with Riley, but claims to have a huge surprise for her later. Riley replies that she also has something big, when she has actually forgotten about their anniversary too. Giselle, Thalia and Amanda are practicing their trio routine for internationals, but Amanda has to leave early due to a family obligation. Max volunteers to help Giselle and Thalia with the trio, but they end up choreographing an entirely new trio routine. Kate then replaces Amanda with Max. West and Eldon see Noah catch a falling glass of milk while he is talking to Cierra, so they test his catching skills. It is revealed that Noah can even catch while facing the other way. Amanda returns to discover she has been replaced, and is crushed. Noah is shown to be able dodge while flipping. Finally, Noah's senses are tested, but even blindfolded and in the dark, Noah is able to catch West, Eldon and Cierra quickly. James creates a song with his band for Riley as her present, and she loves it. Riley puts a huge canvas in Studio A so that she and James can "paint" each other. The anniversary is a success.
78	14	"I Hope I Get It"	Frank van Keeken	Frank van Keeken	April 1, 2015	TBA
With Chloe gone, the team needs to quickly find a twelfth dancer for internationals so the team roster can be submitted by the deadline. They hold auditions from B-Troupe for the spot, with Skylar, Abi, Shannon, Jake and Stephanie, who has to be convinced to try out by Emily, auditioning. Daniel makes a surprise return as well, saying he is there to audition, boasting that the Next Step cannot win internationals without him, but secretly Daniel is in desperate straits after blowing his audition to Juilliard. In the studio office, Michelle assures a concerned Kate that she is staying with The Next Step for internationals, and that Kate will not need to hold auditions for Michelle's spot as well. In Studio A, auditions are held for Chloe's replacement, with all of A-Troupe deciding who will get promoted to the internationals team. All audition very well, but A-Troupe agree that Stephanie puts in amazing performance and has really improved since being demoted to B-Troupe. Stephanie is chosen to fill Chloe's spot, and a heartbroken Daniel hurriedly leaves the studio unnoticed.
79	15	"The New Girl in Town"	Frank van Keeken	Frank van Keeken	April 2, 2015	TBA
As A-Troupe celebrates Stephanie's promotion, Ella, a dancer from England, arrives at the studio – she is a part of the internationals exchange program. Someone from The Next Step must go on exchange, and Kate chooses Amanda to go to Sweden. Amanda does not want to go, and tries to swap with West, but Miss Kate declares that Amanda is now a team alternate, and will go on exchange. Riley is to mentor Ella. Eldon continues to practice for 30 pirouettes, when Ella and Riley enter – Ella offers to kiss Eldon if he does 24 pirouettes. Eldon does 24, and Ella kisses him, which annoys Thalia. Michelle continues to train Giselle at being dance captain, gathering J-Troupers to run scenarios, but Giselle's mock actions result in "bankrupting" the studio. Richelle feels sorry for Giselle, and gives Giselle the dance captain diary that she inherited from Emily. Michelle contemplates returning with her mom after talking to Hunter from Madison on video chat. Thalia attempts to motivate Eldon by kissing West. Riley comes across Ella pranking James by wrapping his drum kit in bubble wrap, and joins in, amused. Riley, Eldon and Thalia visit a conflicted Michelle, as Michelle helps her mom pack.
Part 2
80	16	"Sweet Spot"	Frank van Keeken	Frank van Keeken	September 11, 2015	TBA
A-Troupe is practicing their group routine, but Amanda is away and Michelle has not returned from Madison and no one has heard from her. Phoebe brings in the next letter from internationals, which indicates that a tie in any round will be decided by a duet battle – Giselle assigns the duet to James and Riley. Michelle returns to announce that she is staying with The Next Step. James is preoccupied with his band and cannot devote time to his internationals duet with Riley. Eldon and Thalia try to uncover the studio's "sweet spots", with Thalia getting Michelle to help, but Michelle feels no sweet spots. Ella convinces Riley to stop waiting around for James, and just have fun. Eldon leaves Thalia a love letter in a sweet spot, which Michelle discovers. Riley's goofing around with Ella leads to the nationals trophy getting damaged. James discovers Eldon's love letter from Michelle, and intercepts it. James summons Eldon and Thalia to Hidalgos, and reads parts of the letter to them, before forbidding them from communicating at all. Thalia agrees to this, as she wants a "30 pirouette relationship". Riley realises that she no longer wants to be the "sensible one".
81	17	"Square Dance"	Jay Prychidny	Elizabeth Becker	September 11, 2015	TBA
As the tensions mount ahead of internationals, Ella convinces Riley that the way to get A-Troupe to relax is trick them into believing that they have to learning square dancing for the competition. When a letter from internationals arrives, Ella and Riley put a note in the envelope informing the team that they need to learn a square dance. But this stresses the team out even more, and Riley cannot cope with the stress. She confides to James about Ella's prank, thinking he will understand as James loves to prank himself, but instead James is outraged and disgusted by what Ella and Riley have done. He retreats to the music room, confessing that Riley is no longer the girl he fell in love with. Ultimately, A-Troupe end up performing the square dance, but James does not return, leaving Riley without a partner, so after Ella leaves Stephanie to dance with Riley. In confessional, Riley admits that she has more fun with Ella than she has had with James for a long time which worries her about the future of their relationship.
82	18	"Mixed Messages"	Jay Prychidny	Rachael Schaefer	September 18, 2015	TBA
Thalia and Eldon use intermediaries as a clandestine way of communicating. James and Riley are arguing over Ella and the band, respectively, when Ella interrupts. Riley declares that Ella would "never mess with me", but Ella replies, "Of course I would. I'm from a rival team." Having been proven right, James smirks and leaves. Ella later clarifies that she did not say she "was messing" with Riley, just that she "would mess" with Riley, for the sake of her team, but still wants to be Riley's friend. Ella confesses she will do "whatever it takes to make my team win internationals, even if it means messing with The Next Step". Michelle is crying, and feeling alone, when Cierra finds her, and consoles Michelle about her parents' divorce. Riley's and James' duet practice goes badly, and they argue and their practice ends abruptly. Eldon's latest message to Thalia gets garbled by Ella and West, and James discovers their scheme. Max and Richelle practice for an upcoming duets competition, but Noah kills the mood by asking about Abi. James and Riley argue again about their relationship. West suggests Eldon and Thalia communicate through dance. James quits his band.
83	19	"Never There"	Rachael Schaefer	Chloe van Keeken	September 25, 2015	TBA
A-Troupe is practicing the semifinals routine, but Michelle is not there. Kate informs them that they need to come up with a 5-person dance routine for internationals, and assigns Eldon, Cierra, Stephanie, Thalia and Michelle, but Michelle is still not there and they have to start the choreo without her. Noah is frustrated at not being chosen. James and Riley talk about James quitting the band, and they agree to "walk a mile in each other's shoes", and do a role-reversal exercise for the day. Michelle finally arrives, but is still struggling because of her parents' divorce, and does not have her dance gear. Ella works to convince Noah that A-Troupe is the right place for him. When Kate wants to see the 5-person dance, Michelle still is out of dance gear, and Kate orders Michelle to sit the performance out, which means only 4 of the dancers perform. Kate decides to go with a different group – James, West, Max, Giselle, and Riley. This makes Stephanie angry at Michelle. Michelle apologizes to Miss Kate, but Kate demotes Michelle to alternate for internationals.
84	20	"Cry Me a River"	Steve Bendernjak	Rachael Schaefer	October 2, 2015	TBA
Michelle, Riley, Cierra, Giselle and Stephanie are performing a 2–7 person group routine, with Michelle mostly immobile on a throne. After finishing, Michelle cries on the floor, upset at being an alternate now, and how "useless" she looks on the throne. Stephanie is pushed to approach Michelle and console her. After Noah questions why Eldon is the internationals male soloist, he and Eldon dance battle. Noah eventually admits defeat, confessing that Eldon is amazing. Max, James and West engage Ella in a series of challenges, starting with burping. Ella easily out-burps them, and declares, "First round Ella." Stephanie is still consoling Michelle, when Riley enters Studio A asking to rehearse, proclaiming that Miss Kate chose her to be the internationals female soloist. Michelle cries again. The boys challenge Ella to a raw egg-consuming contest, and Ella wins. Noah and Eldon come up with duet together, and Eldon declares that Noah will be the soloist next year. Stephanie helps Michelle see the brighter side of being an alternate. The boys challenge Ella to a football kicking contest. Max and James fail, but Ella kicks the ball straight through the posts, and wins. Michelle is feeling better, thanks to Stephanie.
85	21	"Today I'm Getting Over You"	Chloe van Keeken	Malek Pacha & Bradley Vermunt	October 9, 2015	TBA
Phoebe wants A-Troupe to work more with B-Troupe, and assigns pairs of A- and B-Troupers duets: Stephanie is partnered with Beth, Cierra is paired with Jake, and Noah is partnered with a reluctant Richelle. This is a problem for Stephanie, as she and Beth are too similar, and Stephanie wants to seriously focus on dance right now, but Beth is excellent at distracting her. Stephanie ends up appealing to Giselle for assistance. Eldon discovers that he has lost his lucky coin, and goes into a panic. Richelle is trying to get over her crush on Noah, but now has to do a duet with him – she challenges Noah to teach her something she doesn't know. James and Riley are impressed by Noah and Richelle. Cierra's dedication to her duet and to dance leads to conflict with her sister Skylar, as Skylar is constantly having to wait around for Cierra to finish her rehearsals. Giselle tries to keep Stephanie and Beth on track. Richelle realizes she no longer has a crush on Noah. Skylar gets even with Cierra. Ella gives Eldon her lucky coin to make up for his lost one. A-Troupers realize that they will ultimately be replaced.
86	22	"It's My Party"	Kim Derko	Rachael Schaefer	October 16, 2015	TBA
Amanda returns from Sweden, and everyone is acting strangely. She discovers that The Next Step is throwing her a surprise welcome home party, and is very happy that she is appreciated. Entertainment at the party includes a musical theater-influenced duet from Eldon and Max, and performances from James' bandmates, Luke and Theo. Abi shows up hoping Noah will invite her to the party, but James has to do it when Noah flubs. Ella and Riley pull one last prank on James, but James is way ahead of them and returns the favor. Cierra informs Amanda of what Amanda missed while she was away, including that Michelle has also been made an alternate. Giselle has a crush on James' bandmate Theo. Cierra and Skylar make up. Ella "knights" West as her gift to him, and then sings to the assembled. Riley admits that she will be sad when Ella leaves to return to England. Giselle and West help Eldon and Thalia with their relationship. Noah finally asks Abi to dance, and they kiss. Amanda commiserates with Michelle about being alternates, but warns Michelle that Sweden will be unstoppable at internationals.
87	23	"Welcome to Miami"	Frank van Keeken	Tricia Fish	October 23, 2015	TBA
An excited A-Troupe arrive in Miami for internationals. Thalia has learned to say "Hello" in 55 different languages. Kate informs A-Troupe that registration is tomorrow, so they get the day off. James has plans for Riley, but Riley goes off with Ella to a Cuban restaurant. Instead, James goes sightseeing with Eldon, who is looking for "sweet spots" for his and Thalia's first date. West acts as a tour guide to popular attractions in Miami for Giselle, Amanda and Stephanie. Ella claims to have forgotten money, declaring that she will fetch it and return. Ella tells Riley to stall, which Riley does by ordering more food. Ella later calls Riley and declares that her team needs her and she will not be returning, leaving Riley with a huge bill to pay. She comes clean to the manager, who gives Riley two options – waitress, or call the police. Riley decides to be a waitress, but it goes badly. James learns of Riley's predicament, and he and Eldon go to the restaurant. They tease Riley, who gets angry, until they help pay her bill. West, Amanda, Giselle, and Stephanie conclude their tour by dancing in front of a beautiful graffiti wall.
88	24	"Lost at Sea"	Frank van Keeken	Chloe van Keeken	October 30, 2015	TBA
Kate and Giselle go to register for internationals, but they are denied when they are informed that James did not sign his registration form. Eldon, James and West go on a boat tour of the Everglades, with their boat captain Jesse, after West menaces James and Eldon with a baby alligator. Kate calls Phoebe at The Next Step for assistance with their registration problem. Captain Jesse disturbs the boys with the story of the "night of the horror of the alligators", recounting a tale about prom students that were massacred by alligators in the Everglades. The airboat breaks down, and Captain Jesse abandons the boys on the boat for a couple of hours while he goes for tools. Phoebe drafts Skylar and Richelle to perform a duet to "cleanse" The Next Step in support of Kate and Giselle in Miami. West gets the airboat working, but only temporarily. Eldon loses the lucky coin he got from Ella in the swamp. Captain Jesse returns to fix the boat, and James discovers that he needs to return to sign his form. James barely arrives in time to sign his form, and The Next Step is registered for internationals.
89	25	"When the War is Over"	Mitchell T. Ness	Rachael Schaefer	November 6, 2015	TBA
On the day of the male and female solos rounds, Eldon is anxious due to the loss of the lucky coin that Ella gave him. Thalia comforts him and Eldon feels better. He performs his solo very well, but does not win. The Swedish male dancer is declared the winner, which gives Sweden five-point advantage in a later round. Riley's friendship with Ella is tested when they have to compete against each other in the female solos. Ella is up before Riley, and when Ella performs Riley realizes that Ella has stolen Riley's entire solo routine. In confessional, Ella explains that there are two reasons why she stole Riley's solo: 1) because Riley's solo was really good, and 2) because Ella believes that it will rattle Riley. Riley feels like a fool, knowing that Ella admitted that she would mess with Riley if given the chance, and Riley had shown Ella her solo routine anyway. Riley confesses that her biggest mistake was believing that Ella was her friend. Kate instructs Giselle to perform the solo instead of Riley. Giselle performs an excellent solo routine, but Ella still wins Miss International Soloist, thus giving England a five-point advantage as well.
90	26	"We Are the World"	Frank van Keeken	Rachael Schaefer	November 13, 2015	TBA
With the small group round fast approaching. Michelle, Giselle, Riley and Cierra are frustrated and annoyed to see that Stephanie is only "marking positions" in their practice, and when Stephanie walks out they consider replacing her. Michelle says she will talk to Stephanie first. Thalia must compete with three other dancers from different countries (Poland, France, and Vietnam) in the first official round of internationals, which forces the dancers to overcome their language differences. Back home, B-Troupe keeps track of the competition at internationals. Michelle finds Stephanie, who declares that the others might be better off without her and should replace her, which angers Michelle. Michelle figures out that Stephanie is having a crisis of confidence, and convinces Stephanie that she deserves to be performing at internationals, and that Stephanie needs to own that. Stephanie overcomes her fears. Eldon begins to suspect that Thalia's Polish teammate is interested in her for more than just dance, but he and Thalia are just friends. Thalia and her group advance their teams to the next round of internationals.
91	27	"Blind"	Mitchell T. Ness	Frank van Keeken & Amy Cole	November 20, 2015	TBA
The representative for internationals informs the 16 remaining team captains that the next round, the 2–7 person group routine, will be performed blindfolded. James video chats with his bandmates, and realizes he misses his band more than he thought he would. West observes The Next Step's 5-person group blindfolded rehearsal, and declares it "terrible". West suggests adding Noah to the routine because of Noah's "gift" for sensing in the dark. England does their routine as a duet, as the routine is easier with just two people blindfolded, and defeat the Philippines who perform with four dancers. West demonstrates Noah's gift to the group, and all agree they need him, but as the routine is for five people, someone needs to go. Stephanie volunteers, but as the team's alternate Michelle backs out of the routine. Sweden performs with seven, and defeats Switzerland. The Next Step performs their acrobatic routine with Noah in Michelle's throne position, and defeat France to advance to the next round. James takes Riley on a date to a salsa club, and they dance. Giselle informs Eldon that he will need to do pirouettes for the next round.
92	28	"Turn, Turn, Turn"	Mitchell T. Ness	Frank van Keeken	November 27, 2015	TBA
The next round of internationals is a 5-person "music mystery" round – the 5-person groups will have to design their routine around music provided by the internationals board that the teams have never heard before. Placement in the "music mystery" round will be determined by a turning competition – whoever is able to do the most spins over the longest period of time wins, which will allow their team to go last in the order, giving that team the most time to choreograph their routine to the new music. Eldon competes in a turning competition against dancers from the seven other teams – if Eldon wins, James declares that he is ready to date Thalia. South Africa loses the turning competition, and have to perform first. Eldon is able to turn the longest, meaning that The Next Step wins and gets to go last in the order. As South Africa performs first, Michelle records the music, and runs it back to the 5-person team of James, Max, West, Giselle and Riley. The Next Step goes up against Jamaica, and wins. Eldon and Thalia kiss. The Next Step advances to the semifinals, where they will face England and Ella.
93	29	"She's Not You"	Mitchell T. Ness	Frank van Keeken	December 4, 2015	TBA
The Next Step is up against England in the 10-person team semifinals round. They get only one hour on stage to rehearse. Riley is determined to beat Ella and England. Alternates Michelle and Amanda take a minute to themselves on stage. West gets food poisoning from a kebab stand, and Michelle is his back-up and must step in for West. Sweden defeats Italy in the first semifinal. England's routine tells the story of a little girl lost in an enchanted forest. Kate and James convince the team to dance for themselves. As they are about to go on stage, West suddenly arrives, insisting that he is ready to go on. Michelle tells West to take the stage with the rest of the team, confessing "Sometimes you just have to step back." Their routine is about James having a dream where he gets pulled into a world of "old fashion" dancing. The Next Step defeat England, and Riley has beaten Ella. They will face Sweden in the finals. James tells Riley that he wants to do the band full-time after finals. As the team warms up on the stage for finals, Lucien arrives and claims to be a competition judge.
94	30	"How It Ends"	Frank van Keeken	Frank van Keeken	December 11, 2015	TBA
With Lucien as a judge, The Next Step has no chance. Kate attempts to get Lucien disqualified, but is unable to, until Daniel emails a video to Giselle, after she hastily brushed Daniel off, that proves Lucien is biased against The Next Step. Lucien is removed as a judge, and from the venue. Riley is worried about the change that's coming, but James says maybe the change is "for the better". The Next Step performs a 10-person routine in which the dancers are puppets, and West is the puppet master. Sweden performs a routine about Nordic gods in the ice. The Next Step scores 97, and Sweden scores 92, but because of Sweden's 5-point advantage, it is a tie. The tiebreaker is duets, which means Riley and James are up. Sweden performs their duet first. Riley's and James' duet is about the magnetic force that always pulls them back together. The Next Step are declared the winners, and are the internationals dance champions. As the team celebrates, Eldon asks Riley, "What comes next?", and Riley replies, "For the first time in my life... I really don't know."

=== Season 4 (2016–17) ===
No. overall	No. in season	Title	Directed by	Written by	Original Can. air date	Original UK air date
Part 1
95	1	"One More Time"	Frank van Keeken	Frank van Keeken	February 15, 2016	TBA
After internationals, the twelve winning team members celebrate by dancing at The Next Step one final time. But A-Troupe is about to change: James is leaving to play with his band full-time, Stephanie is moving to Los Angeles to pursue acting, Max is going to university, Giselle leaves to look for "new challenges", and Thalia leaves for Poland to dance at Bartek's studio and explore her Polish heritage. Even West ultimately decides to leave The Next Step to travel the world. And Eldon is conflicted with Thalia leaving. But Riley and Cierra just helped the team win internationals, Noah is no longer a "rookie", and Amanda and Michelle are determined to get their statuses on A-Troupe back. Kate announces that The Next Step is holding an open house the next day with dancers from all over expected to attend. She also informs them that Phoebe is off to the Galapagos Islands to "swim with turtles". Giselle is auditioning for a worldwide dance tour, and Amanda asks to as well. Prospective dancers Alfie, Cassie, Amy, Henry, Sloane and LaTroy attend the open house. James' little sister Piper also attends, but James says "Piper is not ready for The Next Step."
96	2	"Stir It Up"	Frank van Keeken	Laura Harbin	February 19, 2016	TBA
James attempts to convince Piper not to audition for A-Troupe, but Piper insists she will. Kate is about to close the auditions for A-Troupe, when Skylar shows up at the last minute to audition. Dancers from B-Troupe and Elite, like Ben and Nick, are also auditioning. Nick informs Michelle that Lucien shut down Elite. Skylar and Cierra make a pact: either they both get into A-Troupe, or neither will. Kate announces that the auditions will be held with a morning group and an afternoon group, and each group will be divided in two, with a choreography section and a freestyle section. After talking to James, Eldon makes a decision and informs Miss Kate that he is leaving The Next Step. They tearily say goodbye to each other. Michelle is annoyed because Amanda is with Giselle at the tour audition, which is administered by Tiffany, and is missing the morning A-Troupe auditions. Daniel runs choreo for the morning group. After morning auditions, Amanda returns to tell Michelle that she didn't even make the final cut. They speak with Kate, but Kate is firm that Amanda missed her audition and is no longer in A-Troupe.
97	3	"Heads Will Roll"	Frank van Keeken	Bethany Kaster	February 26, 2016	TBA
Michelle pleads Amanda's case with Miss Kate, but reveals that Amanda missed the A-Troupe auditions because she was at another professional audition. This angers Kate, who reiterates that Amanda is demoted to B-Troupe. Michelle, Cierra and Skylar, and Noah are in the afternoon group auditions. Stephanie runs the choreography session for the afternoon group, and has them do improv first to loosen up. Alfie reveals his musical talents in the warm-up before auditions. Giselle, who did win a spot on the worldwide tour, tells Amanda that she's having an amazing time, and Amanda considers leaving The Next Step. Michelle, Skylar and Noah kill it at the auditions, while some of the newbies like Alfie and Henry impress, but Cierra falters. Stephanie says goodbye to Riley and Michelle, and leaves for the airport.
98	4	"Welcome to the Jungle"	Frank van Keeken	Amy Cole	March 4, 2016	TBA
The new A-Troupe is revealed: Michelle, Richelle, Alfie, Sloane, Piper, Noah, Amy, Henry, Skylar, LaTroy, Cassie, and Riley. Cierra did not make A-Troupe, and pressures Skylar to stick to their pact. But Skylar refuses after sacrificing for Cierra all of the previous year – it is Skylar's turn now. Amanda dances in Studio A, having decided to leave The Next Step. Riley watches Amanda dance. Piper forms the "0% club" with Amy, Cassie and Sloane, as they are all new to The Next Step and will need to rely on each other. Miss Kate summons Riley to the office with some "exciting news" and a shocking offer – Kate has been invited to be a judge on a new reality TV dance show in the United Kingdom, so she is leaving The Next Step, and wants Riley to take over as head of the studio. This will mean leaving A-Troupe. Cierra overhears this, and wants Skylar to suggest to Riley that Cierra be put back in A-Troupe. Riley asks Michelle, Amanda, and James for advice, and they all tell her to follow her heart. Riley accepts Kate's invitation to run the studio, but has to decide on her replacement in A-Troupe.
99	5	"Square One"	Stephen Reynolds	Brad Vermunt & Malek Pacha	March 11, 2016	TBA
As her first act as head of the studio, Riley informs Kate that she has decided that Amanda will take her spot on A-Troupe. Kate disagrees with the choice, still believing that Amanda is not committed to the studio, but Riley sticks by her decision and Kate admires Riley's decisiveness. Riley enters Studio A to tell A-Troupe that she is the new studio head, and insist they not call her "Miss Riley" but just "Riley". She also announces that Amanda will take her spot in A-Troupe. Amanda's introduction is awkward, as only Michelle, Noah and Richelle are happy to see her, and Skylar resents that Amanda did not audition and that her sister Cierra was not even given a chance. Amanda confesses that she will have to prove herself all over again. Riley discovers that there are qualifiers for regionals this year, and the first one is a trio competition. Riley assigns audition trios that include Amanda and Michelle, who are fighting, and Richelle, and Noah, Piper and Sloane. Riley picks Noah, Piper, and Richelle for the trio, which crushes Sloane who is already fearful about not belonging in A-Troupe because she is just a hip-hop dancer.
100	6	"London Calling"	Stephen Reynolds	Ian Malone	March 18, 2016	TBA
West has received a mysterious black box in the mail from London, England. James arrives to meet West in Java Junction (formerly Hidalgo's) and opens the box to find a USB drive. Amanda enters the rehearsal room to find Noah using a bunch of "weird music stuff" to compose a song after his mom told him to "vamoose" out of house. Amanda takes half of the room to rehearse, but is soon distracted by Noah's music-making. Sloane is still upset at losing her trio spot, and the "0% club" suggest she talk to Michelle, as Michelle understands disappointment due to her internationals team experience. Amanda ends up helping Noah with the song and thinks Noah is "a rock star", before hugging him and running out. The USB drive contains an invitation for West and two others to compete in the Bangers and Mash-Ups International Hip-Hop Dance Extravaganza. West invites James, and Eldon, to team up with him. Michelle instructs Sloane that she either needs to quit, or keep fighting to get better. Noah has West, James and Eldon dance to the song they made, and Amanda realizes she has feelings for Noah.
101	7	"Walk This Way"	Stephen Reynolds	Tricia Fish	March 25, 2016	TBA
Riley finds Amanda in Java Junction and discovers that Amanda is "crushing" on Noah. Amanda tries to avoid Noah, but Noah asks to meet her later. Riley is anxious about James going to England. Henry and LaTroy are having a hip-hop dance-off and can't agree on who the winner is. Cassie and Michelle enter and make an offer – Henry and LaTroy will teach them hip-hop, and whoever is the better dance teacher will win. Noah asks for Amanda's help to pick out an outfit for a family gathering, and Amanda soon realizes that Noah has no fashion sense. Riley obsessively plans for James' trip, and James realizes that Riley is actually freaking out about running the studio alone, not about James' trip. James wants to do something really special for Riley. Amanda concludes Noah needs a more "grown-up look" and goes shopping. James stages a dinner date for Riley in Studio A, with Theo and John waiting on them, and Luke performing a song that James wrote for Riley. Cassie and Michelle both pick up the hip-hop well, and it's a tie. Noah brings a pie back from his family gathering for Amanda, which confirms her crush.
102	8	"Runaway"	Stephen Reynolds	Emma Campbell	April 1, 2016	TBA
Riley comes across Alfie in Java Junction, and after he has a strange encounter with a foreign family, she discovers that he is "Prince Alfred", a Swiss prince. James, West, and Eldon fly to London to compete in the hip-hop dance competition. The Swiss ambassador pressures Alfie to return home to Switzerland. In London, Eldon washes in a bidet, not knowing what it is. Riley meets with the Swiss ambassador, and pleads his case, but the ambassador offers Riley a bribe to let Alfie go from The Next Step. The boys register for the competition, but have to invent "hip-hop names". They then tour the venue stage, before starting to dance. Riley declines the bribe, and shows the ambassador Alfie rehearsing dance. The ambassador relents, informing Alfie that she will tell his father that he wants to stay at The Next Step.
103	9	"Dancing with Myself"	Jay Prychidny	Laura Harbin	April 8, 2016	TBA
Riley is supervising the rehearsal for the trio routine for the regionals qualifier when Noah asks if they could go slower. Riley rejects his request. Noah struggles with being "full-out" in the routine with Richelle and Piper. In confessional, Noah admits that he's been pushing himself too hard, and his back has been sore for a week. Riley halts the routine, and demands that Noah explain himself – Noah does not tell Riley about his injury, and lies saying he will be ready. Skylar eavesdrops on the entire proceedings, and suggests that her trio with LaTroy and Henry replace Noah's. Sloane forgets to read the book for "book club" with Amy and Cassie, and lies about having read it, so Amy and Cassie decide to teach her a lesson. Michelle observes Alfie practicing dancing, and asks Alfie for help improving her dancing. Riley agrees to let Skylar's trio audition again, which angers Richelle and Piper. Alfie puts Michelle through a series of physical and mental challenges. Ultimately, Riley sticks with Noah's trio, which worries Noah. Michelle realizes her own fears have been holding her back from fully dancing, and feels free for the first time in a long time.
104	10	"Simple Twist of Fate"	Frank van Keeken	Elizabeth Becker	April 15, 2016	TBA
It is the qualifier for regionals, and Noah is worried. Riley thinks qualifying should be a "piece of cake" but confesses to still being nervous. Back at the studio, Sloane, Amy and Henry set up for a party to "congratulate" the team, even before they have performed! and end up sharing competition horror stories with each other. Michelle, Amanda and Riley give words of wisdom to Piper, Richelle, and Noah, respectively, but Noah continues to conceal his back injury from Riley, saying he is like a rock. The trios competition is fierce, and a new studio named Gemini dominates the competition with a score of 97. The Next Step falter in their trio due to Noah's back injury, originally ranking third, but are eventually eliminated from qualifying by later performances from teams like Rhythm Plus and Dance Inc. Noah feels responsible, but refuses to tell Amanda the real problem. After failing to advance, Riley confesses that she has "never been so disappointed in the team" or in herself.
105	11	"On the Rocks"	Jay Prychidny	Amy Cole	April 22, 2016	TBA
After losing at the qualifiers, Riley dances alone to clear her head, and admits she has no idea where they go from here. Michelle agrees that Riley is responsible for the team's loss, and that no one would judge Riley if she decided to step down as studio head. Skylar begins organizing the other A-Troupers to replace Riley, saying that she saw that something was wrong with Noah, but Riley did not listen to her. Noah lies to Amanda about the circumstances of the trio loss, and Amanda begins to doubt Noah's feelings for her. After talking to Henry, Noah realizes he has to tell Amanda how he really feels, and tell her the truth. Alfie discovers Riley crying, and offers her some needed appreciation. Noah tells Amanda that he "really, really likes" her, and then admits his back injury to her, swearing her to secrecy. Alfie discovers Skylar's scheme, and speaks up in support of Riley at Skylar's meeting, quelling her attempt to replace Riley. Riley video chats with James, and realises that Noah has been acting strangely. When Riley confronts him, Noah confesses his relationship to Amanda to all of A-Troupe instead, and everybody dances.
106	12	"Knowing Me, Knowing You"	Derby Crewe	Ian Malone	April 29, 2016	TBA
Riley announces that the next qualifier will be a small group competition. For team-building, Riley has A-Troupe do anonymous peer reviews, which she hopes will identify the team's strengths and weaknesses. After outing their relationship to A-Troupe just to conceal his back problem, Amanda doubts Noah's feelings for her. Noah asks Amanda out on a "pre-date" to "work out the kinks", so their first real date can be "magical". Amanda will use this to find out how Noah really feels. LaTroy and Sloane are helping each other work on solos for the qualifier auditions, when LaTroy's father texts him wanting to meet. LaTroy then abandons helping Sloane. Riley's peer review project does not work out like she had hoped. Amanda tests Noah during their "pre-date". Sloane is there for LaTroy when his father doesn't show up to see him, despite how LaTroy treated her. Riley meets with both Amanda and Noah about their peer reviews of each other. She reads them, and they come off like sappy love notes. Amanda comes to realize that Noah really does like her. Disgusted with their puppy love, Riley orders them out of her office. Alfie leaves Riley her own peer review.
107	13	"The Game Belongs to Me"	Derby Crewe	Elizabeth Becker	May 6, 2016	TBA
Riley is holding solos auditions for the 5-person small group for the regional qualifier. A-Troupe will vote their top five choices from among all the solos, and Riley will tally the results. Sloane admits to LaTroy that she did not vote for him, because his solo was hip-hop but the group will require contemporary dancing. Riley announces the results: the top four are Alfie, Noah, Amy, and Richelle, but Piper and Michelle tie for fifth, so there will be a dance-off to decide. LaTroy, disappointed, walks out of the studio. Nothing is going to stop Michelle from going to that qualifier. Piper tries to be a good sport, and supportive of her teammate, but Michelle coldly brushes her off. LaTroy asks for Amy's help to improve his contemporary dancing, and she agrees to teach him. Piper confronts Michelle about her cold behavior, and Michelle pretends to break down about her difficult year the year before – however, she is simply playing Piper. When they compete, Michelle declares that she will "destroy" Piper in the dance-off, and a disturbed Piper performs poorly. Michelle wins the fifth spot. Michelle explains to the "0% club" that she did what she did to win.
108	14	"I Can't Go for That"	Lamar Johnson	Emma Campbell	May 13, 2016	TBA
Riley is going to a big gala to represent The Next Step. She asks Michelle to accompany her, but Michelle cannot. Most of the rest of A-Troupe volunteers, so Riley will have to decide who to bring. Skylar confesses that she still has not found her place in the studio. Henry employs Noah and Amy to seemingly play a mind game, about a guinea pig named "Little LaTroy", with LaTroy. Riley asks Alfie to go to the gala with her. The "0% club" feel sorry for Skylar and ask her to join, but Skylar declines as she does not want to be in a "clique". Skylar later explains to Piper that she was in a clique once, and ended up being bullied by the "Queen Bee". Michelle asks Riley if she told James about Alfie, and Riley gets defensive. Riley tells James, who is cool with it, but Riley realises that there is a problem. She tells Alfie that she is too busy to go, and sends Piper to the gala with Alfie instead. A-Troupe has arranged a surprise birthday party for LaTroy – Henry's mind game was simply a ruse. Riley has a video chat date with James.
109	15	"I Only Have Eyes for You"	Samir Rehem	Malek Pacha & Brad Vermunt	May 20, 2016	TBA
Amy and LaTroy are rehearsing a duet together, and at its conclusion Amy says to LaTroy that they should do something about their "chemistry". LaTroy responds by asking Amy out on a date. Piper is doing an interview project for school, and interviews her "dance family", including Michelle, Amanda, Alfie, and Riley. Eldon and West sightsee in London. When LaTroy informs Sloane about his date with Amy, Sloane reacts angrily and storms out. LaTroy seeks Henry's advice, and Henry infers that Sloane's bout of anger derives from her liking LaTroy. LaTroy initially rejects the possibility, but still decides to check in with Sloane nonetheless. West and Eldon start to dance along the Thames, with onlookers giving them money, but are chased away by a strict policeman, or as Eldon calls him, a "busking-busting bobby". To LaTroy's surprise, Sloane reveals that she does "like like" him. Sloane confesses that she doesn't know when she started liking LaTroy, but feels like she has liked him for a long time. LaTroy does not return Sloane's feelings, and she is left heartbroken. Piper tries to cultivate the friendship between Riley and Alfie, which is what Riley is trying to avoid.
110	16	"Love Will Tear Us Apart"	Samir Rehem	Matt Hogue	May 27, 2016	TBA
Riley has a dream in which she kisses Alfie. The 5-person group is rehearsing, but Noah deliberately misses the rehearsal so he can rest his secretly sore back. Sloane is not ready to talk to LaTroy. An infuriated Riley makes Noah prove his dancing abilities in Studio A, which he successfully does, though at the cost of great pain which Noah hides from Riley and Michelle. Riley wants some "friend time" with Michelle, with the intent of talking about Alfie, but Michelle doesn't want to talk about "boys". Riley and Michelle have lunch together, and reminisce about their past in A-Troupe (which includes flashback scenes from season 1). The "0% club" track down Sloane, to "talk it out" about Amy and LaTroy. They end up dancing together, but Sloane is still not OK. Alfie observes Riley and Michelle dancing in Studio A. Later, in her office, Alfie confesses his feelings to Riley. Riley reciprocates those feelings, but declares that they should stay friends as she is with James and is the head of the studio. In confessional, Riley states that she thought this "would be the end of this", but admits that "this does not feel like the end".
111	17	"Nobody's Fault But Mine"	Samir Rehem	Frank van Keeken	June 3, 2016	TBA
The 5-person group is rehearsing, when Riley receives an E-mail from the regionals board. She halts the rehearsal to announce that the winner of the next qualifier will get to steal a dancer from another studio. In London, Eldon realizes he has lost his phone, which contains countless photos, including of Thalia, and makes James and West help him look for it. Riley is directing a group rehearsal, when the Geminis, male and female twin dancers, march into The Next Step to announce that they are "window shopping" for the dancer they intend to steal after they win the qualifier. Riley is concerned that they could steal Alfie or another dancer from The Next Step. Amanda discovers Noah icing his back, and realizes Noah's back is still bothering him. Riley asks Amanda and Michelle for advice, and Amanda advises Riley to pull the team from the qualifier, though Michelle strongly disagrees. Eldon's phone is discovered in a restaurant, and James has West delete a text from Thalia, but West confesses this to Eldon. Riley announces to the group that she is pulling The Next Step from the qualifier, which nearly everyone objects to, with only Alfie coming to Riley's defense.
112	18	"Your Time Is Gonna Come"	Laura Harbin	Matthew MacFadzean	June 10, 2016	TBA
Riley holds a team meeting, and reports that the Geminis did win the second qualifier after she pulled The Next Step from the competition. The third qualifier will be duets, and rather than hold more auditions, Riley declares that Alfie and Noah, as the top two vote getters from the previous round, will perform the duet. But Amanda knows that Noah's back is still bothering him. In London, the Bangers and Mash-Ups International Hip-Hop Extravaganza competition begins. West is competing in the first round, which is all solo head-to-head dance battles. Alfie tells Riley that, as a studio head, he does not think she made the right decision to pull the team – but, as his friend, he is glad she cares about him. In London, West's approach to "trash talking" his competition is unconventional. Noah ducks out on duets rehearsal, and Amanda challenges him on it. In London, West wins 2 rounds out of 3, and the Next Step team advances. Noah realizes that his back is not OK, and informs Amanda, who tells him to talk to Riley. Noah finally confesses to Riley that his back is injured and plans a trip to the hospital to have his back checked.
113	19	"How Deep Is Your Love"	David Storch	Amy Cole	June 17, 2016	TBA
Alfie suggests to Riley that, with Noah potentially out, they should have a "backup" duet. He wants to teach Riley the duet, so she can assess who would be best for it. Amanda is sitting with Noah in the hospital waiting for his back to be checked. To take Amanda's mind off it, Noah wants them to say what they like about each other. LaTroy has big news, and tells Sloane – LaTroy's dad wants LaTroy to come live with him in his place in the country for a while. Sloane reacts angrily to LaTroy's seeming abandonment of her and A-Troupe. Alfie teaches Riley the duet in Studio A, and Riley confesses that no one except James has ever made her feel this way while dancing, "until now". Piper enters, declaring that she would like to be considered for Alfie's partner in the duet. This "bothers" Riley. Alfie wants Riley to perform the duet with him at the qualifier. LaTroy tells Amy he is leaving A-Troupe for a while, but insists that he is not breaking up with her. After talking with Piper and Alfie, Riley decides to hold auditions for the duet. The hospital calls Noah with the results.
114	20	"Heat of the Moment"	Kim Derko	Frank van Keeken	June 24, 2016	TBA
The hospital informs Noah that he will need to have imminent surgery on his back, but even with surgery he may never dance again. Noah reports to Riley that he will need surgery to drain a cyst in his back, and Riley reassures him. Alfie tells Henry that he likes a girl "who has a boyfriend", and Henry responds that "nothing good can come from this". Riley informs A-Troupe of Noah's condition, and will hold auditions for the duet. Amanda is worried about Noah, but needs to be strong for him, confessing "some things are more important than dancing". Michelle tests Piper, by challenging her for Alfie's partner, but Piper does not yield and passes the test. Henry, on behalf of the absent LaTroy, suggests that Amy and Sloane audition for the duet together. Riley cannot get a hold of James on the phone. A-Troupe says goodbye to Noah before he heads off to surgery. Riley holds the duet auditions, and chooses Alfie and Piper, before sending everyone home. That evening, Alfie invites Riley to Studio A and sings a song to her. At its conclusion, they kiss, which a devastated Piper witnesses from the back of the studio unseen.
Part 2
115	21	"Kiss and Tell"	Kim Derko	Frank van Keeken	October 14, 2016	TBA
A-Troupe dances while recounting recent events. Piper and Alfie are rehearsing their duet in Studio A, but are not "connecting", and when Riley enters, an angry and disgusted Piper leaves. Riley is avoiding Alfie. Piper is conflicted, as she feels like she cannot confront Riley and Alfie, and cannot tell James either. Henry eavesdrops on Amanda's phone call to Noah, and Amanda wants to learn Henry's eavesdropping technique. Riley assigns the 0% club the job of cleaning the rehearsal room mirrors, but Cassie conspires to have just Amy and Sloane do it. Cassie tries to get Piper to talk about what is bothering her, but Piper lies to her because "James deserves to know first." Amy gets Sloane to laugh while cleaning, and they reconcile as friends. Alfie tells Henry about the kiss, with Amanda eavesdropping, though she doesn't know who Alfie kissed. Riley video chats with James, who reports that Piper has been acting "moody" lately, but does not reveal the kiss with Alfie to him. After Alfie presses Piper on her behavior, Piper goes to confront Riley in the office, and reveals that she saw Riley and Alfie kissing.
116	22	"Rumour Has It"	Laura Harbin	Bethany Kaster	October 21, 2016	TBA
Riley asks Piper to repeat herself, and Piper reiterates that she saw Riley kiss Alfie. Riley tearfully begs Piper not to tell James, and Piper replies, "You're going to tell James, or else I'll tell him." Riley is avoiding James' calls. Cassie is passing around a "Thinking of you" card for Noah for others to sign. Amanda is worried because Noah is having his surgery today, so Noah sends Theo from Lost & Found to distract her. In London, the boys watch the second round of the hip-hop dance competition. In Java Junction, Cassie asks Michelle and Riley to sign Noah's card, but Piper is very sarcastic to Riley about it, which makes Michelle and Amy suspicious. Alfie wants to talk to Riley, who reveals to Alfie that Piper saw them kiss. Alfie leaves. Amy tries to find out why Piper is angry at Riley, but Piper insists that she cannot tell Amy why. Michelle questions Piper, who blurts out that Riley kissed Alfie. Michelle is shocked, and leaves. Michelle confronts Riley, who confirms the kiss, which enrages Michelle who accuses Riley of being selfish. Cassie explains her negativity. After a tearful call with Piper, James returns home.
117	23	"Here Comes Your Man"	Steve Bedernjak	Brad Vermunt & Malek Pacha	October 28, 2016	TBA
Eldon is nervous about having to replace James in the competition when he receives a text that Thalia is in England and coming to see him. At The Next Step, Amanda is leaving a note for Riley, when Richelle enters with Cooper, Amanda's cousin from England. Cooper is a big fan of The Next Step, especially James. Noah gets out of surgery, and doesn't want Amanda to see him at his weakest, but Amanda just wants "to take care of him". During Cooper's tour of The Next Step, he is handed off from Richelle to Riley to Henry. Thalia arrives to see Eldon, so West exits. Noah snaps at Amanda for "smothering" him, so she leaves, and he immediately regrets it. Piper's and Alfie's duet rehearsal is going poorly, and Piper continues to be sarcastic when Riley enters with Cooper. Thalia assures Eldon that she did not leave him for Bartek, and that she loves him. This causes Eldon to faint, three times! Richelle explains Noah's attitude to Amanda, and Amanda makes a gesture which reconciles them. Cooper dances in Studio A with Henry and Riley looking on. Riley is calling James, when James enters her office in person.
118	24	"Tainted Love"	David Storch	Emma Campbell	November 4, 2016	TBA
Riley is stunned to see James, and starts crying and looking guilty. James asks, "Who?" and Riley replies "Alfie." James storms out. James finds Piper in the rehearsal room, and Piper is about to tell him about Riley when James says that he knows. They hug. In London, it is the two v. two round at the Bangers and Mash-Ups Hip Hop Extravaganza, and West is a little worried that Eldon is distracted by Thalia's return. West loses the first round, so Eldon must take over. Noah is about to leave the hospital, and is nervous because he promised Amanda they would kiss after his surgery, and Noah feels like now is his last chance. Michelle comes to see Riley, despite being mad at her before, because Michelle heard that James is back, and because she is Riley's friend. Immediately, both James and Alfie arrive, but things get tense, and they both leave. After Amanda tells Noah a small white lie to make him at ease, they kiss. Eldon wins the final two rounds at the competition, and The Next Step advances. James angrily dances in Studio A, regretting that Riley never asked him to come home.
119	25	"A Fool in Love"	Patrick Sisam	Amy Cole	November 11, 2016	TBA
Riley feels like her life "is spinning out of control". James tells Riley that he loves and forgives her, and she asks James for "some space today", and he agrees. Riley needs Michelle's help to sort through her feelings. Michelle counsels that Riley needs to make the right choice, or she'll regret it, suggesting Riley spend time with Alfie. LaTroy, feeling lonely in the country, video chats with Amy, and admits that he has a "bad case of FOMO". Skylar has to go to her cousin's wedding, and Cassie helps Skylar get over her fear of public speaking and talking to strangers. Amy arranges for LaTroy to talk to Henry and Michelle, and then tries to get Sloane to speak with LaTroy, but Sloane is reluctant. Riley admits to James that she needs to spend time with Alfie to figure things out, and James reacts angrily. Riley spends time with Alfie, who sings her a song he wrote. Riley admits to Alfie that things with James are not completely over, which hurts Alfie. Sloane video chats with LaTroy, and they reconcile as friends. Riley is dancing in Studio A, when Emily enters, saying she is "here to help".
120	26	"Karma Police"	Patrick Sisam	Laura Harbin	November 25, 2016	TBA
Emily is there to get Riley "back on track", which means getting A-Troupe to regionals. Emily wants the power to make some hard decisions, and Riley agrees. It is Noah's first day in the studio after his surgery, and A-Troupe welcomes him back. Riley introduces Emily to the assembled as a "former dance captain", and declares Emily will be helping out. Riley says the team has to start focusing on regionals or, as Emily points out, they won't be ready if they win the third qualifier. Riley assigns Michelle the solo, assigns dancers to the 4-person, small, and trio groups, and assigns Richelle and Noah to the duet. Sloane wants to be LaTroy's best friend again, and asks Amy for help. Emily tells Riley that she needs to break up with James. Emily questions Noah and Amanda about whether Noah is ready. Riley watches Michelle, Amanda and Amy practice the trio, and Michelle admits that she summoned Emily to come. Piper and Alfie continue to struggle with the qualifiers duet, and Emily challenges Alfie who admits that Piper knows about the kiss. Emily determines that Piper is the problem, and takes Piper off the duet. Riley breaks up with James.
121	27	"Only You"	Trevor Tordjman	Emma Campbell	November 25, 2016	TBA
Michelle performs her regionals solo for Riley and Emily. Emily suggests that the team needs a dance captain, and Emily asks Michelle, but Michelle declines. Noah and Alfie are now doing the qualifiers duet. Alfie tries to practice the duet, but after Noah suggests some outlandish choreo, Noah again makes excuses to avoid practicing. Richelle, Skylar and Amy volunteer to be dance captain, and Emily and Riley perform a series of tests on the candidates, including testing their knowledge of their fellow dancers, and their public speaking skills, which Skylar excels at. Sloane helps rapper Jude from Lost & Found choreograph and film a music video for his song. Noah finds Amanda, who is "Van Damming", to discuss why he can't dance. Alfie calls Riley and Emily in to observe their duet, and Noah admits to them he can't trust himself to be ready by the qualifier, and wants to focus on regionals. Emily, having been injured herself, understands. Emily gives Skylar one final test, which she passes, and she hugs an uncomfortable Emily. Emily also gives Skylar the dance captain diary. Skylar is announced as dance captain to A-Troupe. But the duet still needs a second dancer.
122	28	"Danger Zone"	Elizabeth Becker	Elizabeth Becker	December 2, 2016	TBA
Riley, Emily and Michelle try to figure out what to do about the qualifiers duet. As Emily rolls her eyes, Michelle volunteers. But Emily believes Alfie's routine only works with two male dancers, and boldly suggests James as Noah's replacement. Michelle objects to the idea, but Emily insists that Riley ask James to do it. The quartet group of Skylar, Cassie, Piper and Sloane are practicing, but their fears are ruining their dancing. New captain Skylar tells them to take a break. Riley tries to tell Alfie about James and the duet, but gets lost in a romantic moment. In Java Junction, Skylar orders the quartet to play "Truth or Dare" to get over their fears. Riley finds Emily sitting in her chair, and she demands that Riley ask James to do the duet. Having received a text from Riley, James comes to the studio. He confronts Alfie, who does not back down. Riley asks James to do the duet as a favour to the studio, but James leaves before agreeing. Skylar's gambit works and the quartet dances better. James comes across Emily while leaving the studio, and she challenges him. James coin flips Emily for the duet.
123	29	"Rivalry"	Frank van Keeken	Tricia Fish	December 9, 2016	TBA
James and Alfie testily rehearse in Studio A as Riley and Emily look on from the office. Later, Riley, Emily and Skylar are watching the final qualifier duet performances from the audience, while James and Alfie are backstage. Riley wants to give them a pep talk, but Skylar already has. Emily tells Riley not to go backstage, but Riley can't resist. After thanking both James and Alfie, James witnesses Riley kiss Alfie. Back at the studio, Noah calls Phoebe in the Galapagos for help in clearing the studio's "negative energy". Oberhauser Dance Academy scores a 96 in the duets, making them the team to beat for the qualification spot. Alfie tries to talk to James, but James is too enraged. Both channel their emotions into the duet, which is a success. They also score 96, so it is a tie. The tiebreaker is a solo. While the Oberhauser soloist performs, Riley cannot choose between James and Alfie, and both argue about who should solo. Out of time, and with the others still arguing, Skylar takes the stage to perform the solo. Skylar's solo wins the qualifier tiebreaker, and The Next Step advances to regionals. James thanks Emily, and leaves.
124	30	"Nobody's Perfect"	Mars Horodyski	Tricia Fish	December 16, 2016	TBA
Riley calls James at the airport to thank him, but he is short with her. Riley tells Alfie that James has returned to London, so Alfie wants to take Riley on a celebratory first date. Amanda, Amy and Michelle are practicing their trio, but Michelle has her mind on her solo, and asks for time to work on it. This displeases Amanda. Richelle approaches Amanda and Amy, offering herself to practice the trio, with the intention of replacing the distracted Michelle, and they agree. Riley arrives for her date, and Sloane acts as the maître d', ushering her into Studio A, where Alfie has a romantic date planned. This bothers and distracts Riley, as this is also where she and James had their last date (in "Walk This Way"). Noah declares to Amanda, "I love you", six times, but she does not say it back. Richelle's gambit prompts Michelle to focus on the trio. Riley gets so upset by memories of James that she runs out of the date. A forgiving Piper explains to Alfie about Riley and James' date. Amanda reassures Noah. Alfie finds Riley in the lounge, and stages their date there instead. James arrives back in London.
125	31	"Shake it Off"	Samir Rehem	Matthew MacFadzean	March 17, 2017	TBA
Alfie surprises Riley in Java Junction, and in parting she calls him "James" by mistake. The 5-person group, consisting of Alfie, Henry, Noah, Skylar and Sloane, is rehearsing their dance, but Noah is still skittish after his surgery and is "marking" the routine. This is unsatisfactory to dance captain Skylar, so she summons Noah for a "training montage" session in the rehearsal room. Cassie has to do a video presentation for her history class, but she doesn't like history. Amy inquires what Cassie is doing, and it turns out Amy loves history and volunteers to help Cassie with her project, which Amy suggests should be focused on the history of dance styles since the 1960s. Amy tells Cassie to meet her in Studio A, where Amy assembles some of their fellow dancers to demonstrate dance styles from various decades. Riley accidentally calls Alfie "James" a second time, which really puts Alfie off. Riley insists on throwing a date for Alfie to make up for it, but it goes badly, and Alfie leaves early. Skylar's training montage helps Noah regain his confidence.
126	32	"Come Together"	Samir Rehem	Frank van Keeken	November 17, 2016 (Note: "Come Together" is the thirty-second produced episode in the fourth season, but was the twenty-sixth fourth season episode to be broadcast. It aired on November 17, 2016, as a special episode for Family Channel's Stand UP! Bullying Awareness Week promotion.)	TBA
Ahead of regionals, Riley has A-Troupe participate in a series of anti-bullying exercises. The first of these involves Michelle and Richelle, and examines the impact that group dynamics have on bullying. The second exercise consists of Amanda and Cassie, and involves Amanda traditionally bullying Cassie. In the confessional segment, Amanda admits to Cassie that she was a bully when she was at Elite, but says she is no longer like that. In the third exercise, Skylar engages in cyberbullying of Piper by sending her a series of mean and hurtful text messages. The final exercise involves the physical bullying of Henry by Noah. In the latter three exercises, the solution involves getting others involved: Amy helps Cassie to get the upper hand on Amanda; Sloane helps Piper appeal to a higher authority, in this case studio head Riley, in order to expose Skylar's actions; and Alfie is able to intervene on Henry's behalf which renders Noah powerless to continue his bullying. Having learned valuable lessons from the exercises, all of A-Troupe, including Riley, dance together.
127	33	"It Ain't Easy"	Samir Rehem	Ian Malone	March 24, 2017	TBA
A-Troupe is rehearsing their regionals finals routine when LaTroy returns to the studio, and is warmly greeted. Riley is avoiding spending time with Alfie, and she confesses that she needs time to "figure it out". LaTroy lies to Amy about his time with his father, and tells her he wants to learn the choreo by himself. In London, James says he wants some "alone time". To avoid Alfie, a distracted Riley asks Richelle and Noah to perform their duet for her. James is sitting on a bench, when Ella unexpectedly sits down. James tells Ella everything that happened with Riley, and Ella counsels James to stop thinking about Riley by doing something else, like the hip-hop competition. LaTroy finds Sloane, and tells her that his father effectively abandoned him after the renovations were done. Sloane counsels LaTroy that his relationship with his dad needs to be on LaTroy's terms. Alfie wants to have lunch, but Riley brushes him off. Michelle questions Riley, who admits that she is avoiding Alfie, and Michelle suggests that it is because Alfie is "not James". Ella calls Riley, revealing that Riley has reconciled with Ella and had sent Ella to speak with James.
128	34	"Bold As Love"	Brad Hruboska	Ian Malone	March 31, 2017	TBA
Alfie wants to go away on a trip with Riley, telling her to pack and meet him at the airport. In London, it is the final round of the Bangers and Mash-Ups International Hip Hop Extravaganza, and Eldon, West and James are up against Fuego Fuego from Spain. West is worried about James' focus. Riley tells Michelle about her trip with Alfie, and leaves for the airport. In the hip-hop finals, the teams compete until all three dancers are eliminated in dance-offs with the other team. Eldon is eliminated first, but West gets the first dancer from Fuego Fuego eliminated. West is then disqualified for touching the rival dancer, meaning just James is left to eliminate the last two dancers. Alfie is frantically waiting for Riley at the airport with the Swiss ambassador, but Riley never arrives. James eliminates the second dancer – he and the final Fuego Fuego dancer, Santana, have to win the best three out of five rounds. James has nothing left until Riley unexpectedly shows up at the competition. With Riley and Thalia cheering him on, James comes from behind, and The Next Step win the competition. Abandoned by Riley, Alfie leaves the country.
129	35	"Taking Care of Business"	Brad Hruboska	Malek Pacha and Brad Vermunt	April 7, 2017	TBA
Riley and James, reunited, dance together on the now empty Bangers and Mash-Ups stage before leaving London. In Riley's absence, Amanda is doing conditioning exercises with A-Troupe in Studio A, with Michelle in the office, when Riley returns to the studio with James. She is welcomed by A-Troupe, but Michelle informs Riley that Alfie has not shown up for several days. Riley apologizes to Piper who says it is not necessary. West and Eldon are brought in by Riley to help with the choreography of the 5-person small group routine, which is now down one person. Riley calls Alfie who notifies her that he has left The Next Step for good and is back in Switzerland. West and Eldon get the small group routine members to bond with one another. Riley seeks Amanda's advice on the Alfie situation, who reassures Riley, but Amanda counsels that Riley should not talk to James about it. Riley informs the small group that Alfie will not be returning. She then does ask James for advice on the situation, and he also reassures her that Alfie is replaceable in A-Troupe for regionals.
130	36	"The Edge of Glory"	Ian Chan	Amy Cole	April 14, 2017	TBA
Riley reviews the competition order for regionals with A-Troupe, and names Piper as Alfie's replacement in the 5-person group. She also declares that Cassie will be the alternate on the 10-person group routine for the regionals finals. Piper struggles as Alfie's replacement in the group routine, insisting the routine now needs to be changed. Michelle and Amanda are in Java Junction when Giselle arrives with luggage in tow. Michelle has to rehearse, so Giselle and Amanda talk. James tries to reassure a nervous Riley about regionals. LaTroy visits Sloane to celebrate their "friendaversary", and Michelle mistakenly labels it a "date". Giselle informs Amanda that there is an open spot in her worldwide dance tour, and invites Amanda to join. But if Amanda accepts, she will not be able to dance in the regionals final, so she has a big decision to make. Cassie and Henry try to convince Alfie to return, but fail, and Cassie is outraged to learn that Alfie left because of a broken heart. Noah helps LaTroy realize that he might have feelings for Sloane. James gets the Lost & Found band to perform for A-Troupe. Amanda does not tell Noah about her opportunity.
131	37	"Even Better Than the Real Thing"	Mitchell T. Ness	Amy Cole	April 21, 2017	TBA
The Next Step arrives at regionals, but when Riley goes to register, they are informed they need to "draw the name for your soloist". Riley did not read the rules properly, and the first round is a freestyle round with the soloist chosen from among all of a team's dancers. Michelle is crushed to not be dancing the solo. Sloane's name is drawn. Sloane is nervous to be doing the solo, and LaTroy tries to calm her down by pointing out that she choreographed Jude's video. The Geminis win their solo round. After Cassie reveals it, Amy says "I love you" to LaTroy, who says it back, but confesses he felt nothing. Sloane takes the stage looking "extremely nervous". Her freestyle solo starts hesitantly, but improves as she goes. But without realizing it, Sloane starts using the choreography from Jude's video, which LaTroy confesses is "cheating". Sloane wins the round, but the Geminis recognize her choreography from the video, and report it to the judges. Sloane is ejected from the competition, and The Next Step is deemed to have lost the solos round, and now must compete in the trios round. LaTroy tells Sloane he loves her.
132	38	"Don't Stop Me Now"	Mitchell T. Ness	Laura Harbin	April 28, 2017	TBA
The teams that advanced in the solos round, compete in the quartet round, with the Geminis advancing again. As The Next Step lost, they must compete in the trios round. Michelle goes off to rehearse, but feels extremely dizzy for a moment. Skylar is charge of making sure their trios round paperwork is in order. She discovers a problem, but is prevented by security from fixing it as Giselle is still the recorded team captain. Amanda interrupts Michelle rehearsing to tell Michelle about the offer she received to go on tour, but Michelle reacts angrily at the revelation. Amanda finally tells Noah about her offer, and Noah tells her to go for it. Piper is sent to retrieve Michelle, but finds Michelle manically rehearsing, and worries that Michelle is pushing herself too hard. Skylar stares down security to get the required paperwork, barely in time. The trio of Amanda, Amy and Michelle perform, but having overexerted Michelle starts to feel faint and collapses at the routine's conclusion. Amanda and Amy cover this, and The Next Step wins. But Michelle is rushed to the hospital for exhaustion and dehydration. A guilt-ridden Riley watches as Michelle is taken away on a stretcher.
133	39	"Living on a Prayer"	Mitchell T. Ness	Laura Harbin	May 4, 2017	TBA
Alfie is dancing in his studio in Switzerland when James arrives. A nervous Richelle, and Noah, perform their duet – they win and advance to the semifinals. James tells Alfie that he and Riley are the love of each others' lives, and Alfie needs to accept that and come back and perform for the team as they now don't have enough dancers for the regionals finals. Amanda must decide by day's end whether to except the professional dance tour offer. The semifinals is the small groups round. The Geminis advance again. James appears to fail to convince Alfie to come back for the team, but before leaving points out to Alfie that he has friends now. Amanda rushes from backstage, annoying Riley, to inform Giselle that she is turning down the tour offer as she has finally found her "spot" on A-Troupe. The Next Step performs, with LaTroy and Piper now in the small group routine. They win, and advance to the finals. Amanda tells Noah that she is staying, and says "I love you" to him. Riley and the team decide to perform in the final with just 9 dancers, when James arrives, with Alfie.
134	40	"A Change is Gonna Come"	Mitchell T. Ness	Frank van Keeken	May 12, 2017	TBA
A-Troupe celebrates Alfie's return, and now have 10 dancers to compete. Riley calls Michelle who insists she is cleared to dance, but Riley makes no promises. LaTroy breaks up with Amy, devastating her. The Gemimi twins boast to Riley and Alfie that they are glad they didn't poach Alfie, as Alfie is a "quitter". Sloane attempts to console LaTroy, who admits to breaking up with Amy, telling Sloane "You know why." The Geminis perform an artistic piece involving multiple twins as dancers. Michelle arrives backstage, in costume, demanding to perform. At first Riley resists, telling Michelle that this would necessitate pulling a dancer. Riley decides to bench Amanda for Michelle, saying Amanda has been "so distracted" lately. But Amanda protests that she just turned down a professional offer in order to dance with the team. Amanda runs out, devastated at the betrayal, and Noah runs after her. Noah tries to console Amanda, who tells him to go dance, even though she cannot stand to watch it. The Next Step performs in the finals with a lively and athletic routine utilizing a skate ramp. The Next Step loses to the Geminis. Afterwards, Henry is hopeful, but Noah cannot reach Amanda.

=== Season 5 (2017) ===
No. overall	No. in season	Title	Directed by	Written by	Original Can. air date	Original UK air date
Part 1
135	1	"A New Regime"	Derby Crewe	Rachael Schaefer	May 26, 2017	TBA
It is eight months after The Next Step's regionals loss. Riley is no longer studio head and is now in business school, Cassie and Alfie have left the studio, Sloane has taken a job as Luther Brown's assistant, and Noah has broken up with the absent Amanda and is interested in a new dancer named Jacquie, who is Henry's ex. Auditions for A-Troupe take place in the new east studio, called Studio One, with everyone having to audition. Michelle arrives and is surprised to see Emily, who announces herself as the new studio head at The Next Step. She introduces Daniel as her new choreographer. Emily and Daniel are brutal in the auditions, cutting anyone who is not a classically trained dancer – LaTroy, Henry, and even Skylar are cut, while Emily cuts Amy for being "difficult"; J-Trouper Ozzy also fails to make the cut, as does former hockey player Josh. Winning spots on A-Troupe are Richelle, Noah, Piper, and newcomers Jacquie, Lola and Zara. Afterwards, Skylar is so outraged she quits The Next Step on the spot, while Amy is crushed as her stage mother will be disappointed in her. Michelle, disgusted with Emily methods, prepares to quit A-Troupe.
136	2	"Go West, Young Michelle"	Derby Crewe	Karen McClellan	June 2, 2017	TBA
A surprised Emily finds Michelle dancing in the Studio A. Michelle informs Emily that she is quitting A-Troupe and will now be the studio head of the new "TNS West" in Studio A. Emily protests, but Miss Kate confirms her agreeing to this, with Emily now running A-Troupe in Studio One as "TNS East", believing that the competition will good for both troupes. Emily warns that Michelle is in "way over her head". With Michelle quitting, a spot in TNS East opens up, which Amy inquires about, but Emily reports that she has already chosen Josh, whom she feels is more motivated. Josh is welcomed to A-Troupe. Michelle gathers the dancers that Emily rejected and offers them a spot in TNS West, which Ozzy, LaTroy, Henry, a reluctant Amy, and several others accept, though they are three dancers short of a competitive team. Daniel runs A-Troupe, and especially Piper, through a tough practice session. West is the choreographer of TNS West. Emily blacklists Michelle's dancers. Noah changes choreography to help Piper, but is reprimanded by Emily. While TNS West practices, talented but untrained Kingston arrives after West found him online. Amy misleads her mother about being in A-Troupe.
137	3	"Dance, Lies and Hoverboards"	Jay Prychidny	Emma Campbell	June 9, 2017	TBA
Emily confiscates phones in Studio One while dancers are there. Amy runs West's new choreography, but untrained dancer Kingston is unable to pick it up, as Kingston knows none of the usual dance terms. Emily runs a rehearsal, but Piper is struggling. Emily announces that Richelle is the TNS East dance captain. Lola tries to befriend Richelle, but Richelle is initially suspicious. West attempts to teach Kingston the choreo, and Kingston records West, insisting that he is a "visual learner", which concerns West. Piper and Amy converse in Neutral Grounds (formerly Java Junction), when Amy's mom enters, revealing to Piper that Amy has been lying to her mother about being in A-Troupe. Amy forces Piper into learning a duet, to convince Amy's mother, with Amy promising to help Piper with the TNS East choreo. Michelle informs Kingston that he is not ready yet, and needs more training, but Kingston begs to have until the end of the day. Emily catches Piper rehearsing A-Troupe choreo with Amy, and reprimands Piper, which makes her angry with Amy. Kingston fails to learn the choreo, so Michelle cuts him, but relents and makes him provisional after seeing him in Noah's "Baby Ballet" class.
138	4	"Leon Me"	Jay Prychidny	Ian Malone	June 16, 2017	TBA
As Amy, Henry and Ozzy look on, Richelle and Lola enter Studio A and begin to remove furniture. Henry determines from Noah that Emily is bringing in professional choreographer Leon Blackwood to teach a masterclass for TNS East. Henry reiterates to Noah that Noah needs to stay away from Jacquie. Henry relates to Michelle, Amy and Ozzy about Leon Blackwood's class, and they decide to crash it. As Emily and Michelle argue, Leon Blackwood enters, which prevents Emily from ejecting Michelle and her dancers from Studio One, though Emily tells Michelle that her dancers can only "audit" the class. Leon builds a 5-person routine with Jacquie, Noah, Josh, Lola, and Amy, which annoys Emily, and further angers Piper. Leon pairs Jacquie and Noah in the dance, which bothers Henry. Noah and Jacquie later share a "moment", which Henry interrupts. Leon thanks "co-studio heads" Emily and Michelle before leaving, further irritating Emily. Afterwards, Piper avoids Amy, which causes to Amy to cry, as Cassie and Sloane are gone so she is alone now. Amy lashes out at Michelle for crashing the masterclass. Emily forbids TNS East from discussing A-Troupe business with any outsiders. Henry ends his friendship with Noah.
139	5	"It's All Fun and Games..."	Steven Reynolds	Brad Vermunt	June 23, 2017	TBA
Emily informs TNS East that she has entered them in their first competition, a duet. Emily picks Noah and Richelle, which disappoints Jacquie. TNS West is practicing their regionals choreography, when LaTroy decides to prank a boastful Ozzy – LaTroy challenges Ozzy to retrieve something from Emily's office. Noah rehearses the duet with Richelle, but finds her "emotionally stiff", and wants Jacquie on the duet instead. Ozzy returns to report on a competition for dancers from around the world, where the price is $1000 each. Josh and Zara impress each other with their hip hop dance skills. Noah expresses his concerns about the duet to Emily, who tells him that she does not make decisions based on who Noah has "a crush on". Ozzy teaches the others a "Litvanian traditional dance" for the competition, but Ozzy is just returning the prank. Jacquie is flattered by Noah's intent. Amy's mom discovers her dancing in TNS West. Michelle scolds the dancers for Ozzy's prank. An indignant Richelle castigates Noah for trying to get her off the duet, and he misses his date with Jacquie. Amy's outraged mom pulls her from TNS West, making Michelle wonder if she is stringing her dancers along.
140	6	"No Good Deed"	Stephen Reynolds	Jan Caruana	July 7, 2017	TBA
A dejected Amy is in Neutral Grounds after being pulled from the studio, but Piper has plans to get Amy back on A-Troupe. Noah admits to Jacquie that Henry is behind his backing off pursuing her. Jacquie confronts Henry, and orders him to stay out of her business. Ozzy and Kingston decide to help Henry get past Jacquie. Piper helps Amy learn Emily's choreography. Ozzy and Kingston want to set Henry up with Heather, the Neutral Grounds barista. Amy pleads with Emily and Daniel for another chance, and they agree to see her dance with Piper, though Emily is noncommittal afterwards. Heather has a boyfriend, but talking with her makes Henry feel better. Jacquie informs Noah that she talked to Henry, and Noah runs out. Noah sees Henry with Heather, and Ozzy tells Noah that they are "on a date", which puts Noah at ease. On Piper's way to a meeting with Emily, Amy tells her that she is back on A-Troupe. In Emily office, Emily and Daniel notify Piper that she is cut from A-Troupe to make room for Amy. Piper seeks out Michelle and joins TNS West. Heather is revealed to be a dancer.
141	7	"Heathers"	Stephen Reynolds	Karen McClellan	July 14, 2017	TBA
The two troupes rehearse for Daniel and West, respectively. Michelle rushes into Emily's office after receiving an E-mail from Miss Kate that only one troupe can represent the studio at regionals. Emily brushes off Michelle's chances, challenging Michelle to a competition – the winning troupe goes to regionals. Despite not yet having a full team, Michelle agrees. Piper and Amy enter an empty Neutral Grounds, and are shocked to see Heather dancing. Noah asks Jacquie on a date, but she blows him off. Zara arrives late to Richelle's rehearsal, begging an excuse that Josh knows is untrue. Noah embarrasses Jacquie during the rehearsal. Piper attempts to convince Heather to join TNS West, but Heather is adamant that is done with dancing. Richelle counsels Jacquie against dating Noah. Josh gets Zara to admit that she was late because she was at a math competition. Heather confesses to Piper that she quit dance because her parents couldn't afford it. Jacquie tells Noah that they should focus on dance. Zara's next math competition conflicts with the troupes' dance battle. Piper suggests to Michelle that they hold a Dance-a-Thon for dancers like Heather, and Michelle names Piper dance captain. Noah and Jacquie are together.
142	8	"12 Hour Party People"	Stefan Scaini	Rachael Schaefer	July 21, 2017	TBA
As TNS West prepares for the Dance-a-Thon to raise scholarship money, Piper drags Heather into Studio A, bragging that she told everyone about Heather's situation. Heather is mortified and rejects the overture. Michelle insists that they go forward with the Dance-a-Thon despite Heather's rejection. All the TNS West dancers gathered pledges, except for Ozzy, who ends up getting a pledge from Emily just to make him go away. Dancers are to dance 12 hours straight for the Dance-a-Thon, but anyone who stops dancing is eliminated. Ozzy's goofing around causes Piper, who has the most pledges, to twist her angle. Piper begs Heather to sub in for her, and Heather reluctantly agrees. Michelle and West duet to start off the Dance-a-Thon. LaTroy is eliminated first. Noah comes to offer his support, but Henry is aloof. Lola cons Richelle into coming in an attempt to get her to have fun. At the 8-hour mark, original A-Troupers James, Riley, Eldon, and Thalia, and John and Theo from Lost & Found, arrive to perk up the remaining dancers. Emily brings Michelle a cheque to show her support. Only Heather and Henry go the distance and finish. Everyone celebrates as Lost & Found perform.
143	9	"A Tale of Two Eldons"	Stefan Scaini	Karl DiPelino	July 28, 2017	TBA
Emily and Michelle are choreographing their teams for the dance battle, but both feel their routines need "something", deciding they need Eldon to improve their choreography. Michelle needs a tenth dancer immediately, and she auditions a dancer named Elliot, who impressed her. Michelle immediately offers Elliot a spot on her team, though Elliot resists her attempts to hug him. Eldon arrives in TNS East and speaks with Emily, before going to get a juice. In Neutral Grounds, Eldon runs into Michelle, who confirms with Eldon that his session with TNS West has been moved up to the morning. Eldon did not check his E-mail, and was unaware, but lies to Michelle, intending to run the sessions with both TNS East and TNS West at the same time. Michelle introduces Elliot to TNS West, but Elliot's arrogance rubs everyone the wrong way, especially Piper. Eldon continually runs back and forth between the two studios, making mistakes along the way, like confusing Lola for Jacquie in a solo section, and calling Michelle "Emily". Emily and Michelle confront Eldon about choreographing for both of them, and Eldon runs away. Piper wants Elliot gone.
144	10	"United and Divided"	Stephen Reynolds	Karen McClellan	August 11, 2017	TBA
To determine the location of the dance-off between TNS West and TNS East, Piper and Richelle decide that a hip hop-ballet mashup duets competition will decide. Elliot continues to rub everyone the wrong way, while "pulling the wool" over Michelle's eyes. Piper and Elliot, and Noah and Amy, are chosen for the duets. Daniel's tough corrections for Noah's dancing irritate Noah. Noah has had enough of Henry's coldness, and chastises Henry. Rehearsing with Elliot is a miserable experience for Piper, and Elliot insists on changing West' choreography, ridiculing it as "dance pageant choreography". Noah witnesses this, and Elliot dismisses him from Studio A. The duets competition begins in Studio One with Noah and Amy. Henry realizes that Noah was right, and apologizes to Jacquie for everything. Piper and Elliot perform in Studio A, with Elliot's revised choreography, and are judged to be the winners. Elliot lies about the choreo changes, but Noah exposes Elliot's lies, and Piper cannot take it anymore, declaring "Elliot is the worst." Michelle dismisses Elliot from the team. Henry apologizes to Noah, and they reconcile. With Elliot gone, Michelle asks for an extension, which Emily denies. But Noah declares that he is joining TNS West.
Part 2
145	11	"East Meets West"	Mitchell T Ness	Rachael Schaefer	October 13, 2017	TBA
Both teams are rehearsing for the studios' dance battle, with Noah now on TNS West, and Emily down a dancer on TNS East. Zara confesses to Josh that she intends to do both the math competition and the dance battle, but Josh is skeptical that she can make it back to the studio in time – Josh informs Emily. Jacquie is competitive with Noah. Emily pulls Zara from the dance battle, and proposes to Michelle that the dance battle should be a 5-person small group of the best dancers. Michelle agrees. Before the dance battle begins in Studio A, it is revealed that Elliot has joined A-Troupe, and will be performing in Emily's small group. Kate enters with Riley and James, who will be judging the dance battle with her. TNS West goes first, with Noah, Henry, Ozzy, Heather, and Piper performing a mostly hip-hop routine to rock music. Amy, Jacquie, Lola, Richelle, and Elliot perform a predominantly contemporary routine for TNS East. Zara returns late, proving Josh right. Josh blows off a family event to stay. Kate, Riley and James choose TNS East as the winners. It is the end of the road for Michelle and TNS West's dancers.
146	12	"Brave New World"	Mitchell T Ness	Matt Hogue	October 20, 2017	October 17, 2017
TNS East celebrate their win by dancing. In Studio A, a despondent Michelle contemplates disbanding her team. Elliot gets A-Troupe new studio jackets. Noah, Kingston, and Ozzy are moping in Neutral Grounds, when Jacquie enters wearing the new studio jacket, and Ozzy surmises that Elliot must be rich. Noah declines to celebrate with Jacquie later. LaTroy is freestyling in Studio A, when he is kicked out by a J-Troupe rehearsal. Sloane enters, and informs LaTroy that she has been promoted to dancer on Luther Brown's tour, and she wants LaTroy to take over for her as Brown's assistant. Piper finds it tough to hear Sloane's and Amy's good news. LaTroy informs Michelle that he is leaving TNS West, and she encourages him to take the job and wishes him well. Elliot challenges Richelle during rehearsal, but she takes his suggestions. Noah tells Jacquie how he really feels about losing. Ozzy and Kingston find Elliot's credit card, discovering something about him. LaTroy says goodbye to Henry, and leaves with Sloane. Jacquie is there for Noah. Ozzy and Kingston inform Michelle that Elliot is a former professional dancer, meaning Elliot is ineligible to compete, and TNS East's earlier win is invalid.
147	13	"TNS: Civil War"	Melanie Orr	Jan Caruana	October 27, 2017	October 21, 2017
As A-Troupe is rehearsing in Studio One, Michelle barges in and announces to everyone that "Elliot has disqualified all of you" from regionals. In Emily's office, Michelle declares that Elliot is a "paid Broadway dancer", who was kicked off six productions for "behavioral issues", and is therefore ineligible to compete. Emily ejects Elliot from The Next Step. Michelle insists that her team should go to regionals now, but Emily believes she won fair and square. TNS West interrupts A-Troupe's rehearsal and stages a sit-in protest wanting Emily to concede. Kingston and Lola enter Studio One to find the two troupes in chaos, and are followed shortly by Miss Kate who is appalled at the bitter acrimony. Miss Kate announces that "No one is going to regionals." Kate feels they have all lost sight of the love of dance, and a break from competition is what they all need. Everyone is depressed and angry, except for Kingston who is still excited to practice and improve as a dancer. As Emily and Michelle bitterly argue, Piper observes Kingston, Lola and Ozzy dancing together in Studio A, and it gives her an idea. Piper proposes uniting the two studios to Amy.
148	14	"Stand Together or Fall Apart"	Melanie Orr	Karen McClellan	November 3, 2017	October 24, 2017
An uncertain Noah dances alone, when Piper and Amy enter and propose showing a merged troupe from the two studios to Miss Kate. Noah agrees to join them. Piper, Amy, and Noah continue recruiting people for the merged troupe, but Jacquie is skeptical. Josh dances in Studio One when his brother Adam enters, informing Josh that he has made a AAA hockey team. This will force Josh to move away with his family. Kingston asks Lola to teach him partnering and ballroom dancing, but it is hard for Kingston to pick up. Skylar, now dance captain at the Gemini studio, attempts to entice Jacquie to join the Geminis by offering her a featured solo for regionals, and tells Noah this too. Heather offers Josh boarding to stay in town for dancing. Lola successfully teaches Kingston partnering. Josh's parents will not let him stay in town. Skylar and Jacquie enter Studio A, and Skylar admits to feeling no nostalgia, only pity. Jacquie is about to accept Skylar's offer, when the merged troupe of 11 dancers enters to rehearse. Jacquie stays with The Next Step, thwarting Skylar's gambit. Amy's mom informs Amy that she has an audition with the Geminis.
149	15	"This Changes Everything"	Derek Ryan	Rachael Schaefer	November 8, 2017	October 28, 2017
Ozzy conspires to lock Michelle and Emily in Emily's office so that the merged troupe can rehearse without interference. Piper and Richelle start the rehearsal without a late Amy. Emily divides her office with tape to keep Michelle to the other side. They bitterly accuse each other of being responsible for what has transpired. Ozzy makes a choreo suggestion and is ignored, but when Josh suggests the same thing it is accepted. As they are about the change the choreo for Amy's absence, Amy rushes into Studio A from her Gemini audition. Ozzy expresses his frustration to Noah, who suggests that Ozzy needs to act more serious. Michelle and Emily start to see things from each other's perspective. Ozzy pitches another idea in a serious tone, and this time everyone loves it. Amy gets into the Geminis. Emily and Michelle escape from the office, and arrive in Studio A to see Miss Kate, and the combined troupe ready to perform, and have to play along. The combined troupe performs to "Stand Up", and showcase all of their talents. Michelle and Emily confess that their rivalry held their dancers back. Miss Kate approves the merged troupe to compete for regionals.
150	16	"Stand and Deliver"	Derek Ryan	Brad Vermunt, Ryan Spencer	November 15, 2017	November 4, 2017
Noah, Kingston, Jacquie, Josh and Zara celebrate by freestyling in Studio One. Emily and Michelle proclaim that the "new A-Troupe" needs a dance captain, and will hold a vote. Piper and Richelle both want to continue as dance captain. Lola agrees to help Richelle campaign. Piper and Henry try to call Amy on her first day at Gemini. Emily tests Heather by assigning her a filing task, but Heather gets distracted by others goofing around. Emily catches Heather and expresses her disappointment. Amy's mom enters and informs Piper that Amy never made it to Gemini. Piper discovers Amy hiding in the locker room, and tells Amy that she must talk to her mom. Richelle and Piper start competing about the perks they will give out as dance captain, and Noah declares that they are acting ridiculous and everyone needs to work as a team. The vote for team captain is held. Amy stands up to her mother and insists on staying at The Next Step. Emily and Michelle announce that the new dance captain is Noah. Richelle is crushed and lashes out at Lola. Heather finishes the filing anyway, impressing Emily who hires Heather for around the studio work.
151	17	"Oh Brother! Why Art Thou Here?"	Kim Derko	Emma Campbell	November 22, 2017	November 11, 2017
Emily and Michelle approvingly observe Noah acting as the dance captain of A-Troupe, but Richelle resents the development. They argue over whose choreo to use for the qualifier video, and put Daniel and West in charge, who want a small group section with Amy, Josh, Kingston and Ozzy, and a female solo that Jacquie, Richelle and Zara will audition for. Richelle feels she needs to get the solo. As the small group rehearses in Studio One, Josh enters to find his brother Adam there, which annoys Josh. Richelle apologizes to Lola for lashing out at her. Zara quits the math team, to focus on dance, thrilling her math nemesis Marcus. Piper, depressed about the solo, insists upon teaching Heather hip-hop dancing. But Heather is a contemporary dancer, and instructs Piper to stop "captaining" her, forcing Piper to realize that she misses being dance captain. Josh confronts Adam about the visit, and Adam angrily admits that he was kicked off the AAA hockey team. Before the audition, Richelle tries to psych Zara and Jacquie out. Josh cheers up Adam with dancing. Daniel and West choose Zara for the solo. Richelle glares at Zara, feeling Zara did not deserve it.
152	18	"I Have a Vision"	Kim Derko	Ian Malone	November 29, 2017	November 18, 2017
The team prepare to shoot their qualifier video for regionals, with Daniel nervous and West excited. Ozzy rushes in to declare "We're doomed", and shows them a video from a rival studio which involves their entire studio, is intricately choreographed, and is professionally produced, filmed and edited. Everyone panics, and the video shoot is cancelled. Emily and Michelle decide the whole video concept needs to be redone, and West suggests that A-Troupe should come up with the solution. As the dancers come up with ideas, Piper and Josh bond, while Richelle's hip makes a cracking noise while she and Lola brainstorm choreography which Richelle keeps secret. Several ideas are proposed to Noah, including an idea Richelle steals from Zara, but Ozzy's second routine concept of the story of rival studios TNS East and TNS West ultimately coming together is deemed the winner. In the locker room, Richelle confesses to Lola that the doctors diagnosed her with snapping hip syndrome, but swears Lola to secrecy. Josh tells Piper he has to go see his brother's A-level hockey game debut. Daniel and West replace Zara with Richelle, as the new solo will be a pointe solo, angering Zara, and worrying Lola.
153	19	"Snap Decision"	Derby Crewe	Rachael Schaefer	December 6, 2017	November 25, 2017
Everyone is practicing for the coming video shoot. Zara is still resentful of Richelle. Noah admits to Henry that he is unable to come up with the choreography for a contemporary section of the routine, and Henry suggests delegating it. Noah asks Jacquie to do it, who is excited at the prospect. Lola is worried about Richelle's hip injury, and asks Heather for advice. Heather assumes Lola has the injury, and reports this to Michelle. Ozzy messes up scheduling the venue for the video shoot, so he and Kingston have to scramble to secure a replacement. Richelle receives flowers, with a card from Elliot. Jacquie ignores Noah's instructions, and choreographs a hip-hop section, which frustrates and angers Noah. Michelle summons Lola into her office, and orders Lola off the video – Lola protests that she is not injured, though she does not expose Richelle. Lola confronts Richelle, but gets nowhere. Noah argues with Jacquie, and takes over the choreography in front of the others, and then reprimands Jacquie for backtalk, which is awkward. Lola presents Michelle a doctor's note, and is cleared to dance. Lola sabotages Richelle's ballet shoes in a final desperate attempt to prevent Richelle from dancing.
154	20	"Pointe of No Return"	Derby Crewe	Karen McClellan	December 13, 2017	December 2, 2017
Emily goes over the checklist for the qualifier video with Ozzy. Richelle discovers her broken pointe shoe, and accuses an innocent Zara, but Lola admits to Richelle that she did it. Noah and Jacquie aloofly rehearse together. Richelle informs Daniel that her pointe shoe is broken, and Daniel suggests a workaround, but then hears Richelle's hip crack. Piper admits to Josh that she likes him, but he only likes Piper as a friend. Daniel reports his suspicions about Richelle's snapping hip syndrome to Emily, but Emily goes into full denial mode, and does not inform Michelle. Everyone arrives at the abandoned opera house that Kingston booked. Lola discovers Richelle duct taping her pointe shoe, intending to dance. The video routine depicts a dance battle between Piper and TNS West, and Richelle and TNS East, until the two troupes merge together after Richelle's pointe solo. Afterwards, Emily and Michelle bond, and Noah and Jacquie are reconciled. As Noah reveals to A-Troupe that The Next Step has qualified for regionals, an irate Miss Kate confronts Emily and Michelle, informing them that Richelle is in the hospital and their irresponsibility with a dancer's safety is about to "change the game, entirely".

=== Season 6 (2018–19) ===
No. overall	No. in season	Title	Directed by	Written by	Original Can. air date	Original UK air date
Part 1
155	1	"Grave New World"	Derek Ryan	Karen McClellan	September 29, 2018	July 16, 2018
In the three weeks since the Richelle incident, Emily and Michelle have been fired, and a new studio head is coming in. Josh, Lola and Zara have left The Next Step, and Heather has been accepted to college, leaving her conflicted. The new studio head is revealed to be Miss Angela, who is known as being a "fixer", and has won regionals eight times with studios like Elite and Gemini. Miss Angela brings in her own dancers – Summer, Finn, Kenzie, and Lily, who is Angela's favorite. Emily and Michelle have been reduced to working in Shakes & Ladders (formerly Neutral Grounds). Miss Angela assesses the dancers, and declares Piper the weakest link, and makes Piper practice acro while the others do planks. Heather, disgusted at Miss Angela's tactics, quits The Next Step and goes to college. Kenzie overhears Noah, Amy, Henry and Jacquie complaining about Miss Angela, and agrees with them that Miss Angela is "the worst". Summer and Finn agree too. Lily is revealed to be Miss Angela's daughter. Michelle counsels Piper to stand up to Miss Angela, which she does by criticizing Lily, so Angela benches Piper. Piper does not show up to the next rehearsal.
156	2	"Wink It Out"	Derek Ryan	Rachael Schaefer	September 29, 2018	July 17, 2018
As dance captain, and with Lily not there, Noah is directing practice. Miss Angela and Lily enter, but Angela affirms that Noah is still dance captain, though Lily has designs on the position. Angela directs them to work duets, and tells them not to worry that Piper is not there. Amy calls Piper, who lies and claims to be ill, but really cannot face going back to the studio. In the next practice, Lily arrives late and then throws her weight around to take over running the practice from Noah. For the duets, Jacquie partners with Finn, which makes Kenzie feel threatened. Miss Angela runs a rehearsal that includes Winnie from B-Troupe, which displeases the A-Troupers. Piper tries to return to the studio, but runs out again in front of Amy. Summer eavesdrops and discovers that Angela puts a lot of pressure on Lily. Summer tries to talk to Lily about Piper, but Lily wants a quid pro quo for dance captain. Kenzie is competitive with Jacquie, but they end up practicing together. Summer tells Noah that he has to give up being captain to save Piper. But Lily promotes Winnie anyway. Richelle returns.
157	3	"Dance-Zilla"	Derby Crewe	Emma Campbell	September 30, 2018	July 18, 2018
A-Troupe are practicing their duets. Richelle has been brought up to speed, and feels responsible for getting Emily and Michelle fired and wants to make it up to the dancers. The duets are performed for Miss Angela, which includes Lily with Ozzy, and Finn and Richelle. Angela picks Lily and Richelle for the duet, and Richelle does not see the problem with Miss Angela, though she starts to see issues in her rehearsal with Lily and Angela. Richelle observes further problems during team practice, concluding Miss Angela's routine is "too robotic", and resolves to do something. Richelle offers to be Lily's assistant dance captain. Concerned that Finn seems interested in Richelle, Ozzy tries to set Finn up with Kenzie. During practice, Lily has Richelle point out all of the dancers' weaknesses, which turns them all against Richelle. Finn and Kenzie come up with a duet, and then figure out that Ozzy set them up. Lily takes Richelle out for shakes at Shakes & Ladders, and Richelle discovers that Miss Angela is one day away from being made a partner in The Next Step. Lily also reveals her mom's plans for the studio, which Richelle intends to use against Angela.
158	4	"Coup d'Etat"	Derby Crewe	Brad Vermunt	September 30, 2018	July 19, 2018
Miss Angela is running through the regionals routine in Studio A, but Richelle and the others are distracted by their plan to get rid of Angela. Miss Kate enters, and then heads off to lunch with Angela. Richelle distracts Lily with their duet so the others can work their plan to expose Miss Angela. While Richelle and Lily practice, Ozzy has to sneak in to retrieve a toolbox, making an excuse to Lily. Piper is in Shakes & Ladders, as she cannot face the studio, and Emily and Michelle endeavour to find out what is wrong. After being beaten at darts, Piper admits to being too embarrassed to go back to the studio. Richelle is unable to stall Lily anymore, and has to admit that A-Troupe is throwing Miss Angela a "surprise congratulations party". Lily is horrified, and tries to stop the party, but Miss Kate and Miss Angela enter. Miss Kate is disgusted by what Angela has planned for The Next Step. Michelle and Emily take Piper into Studio One and help her overcome her fears. After Richelle and Lily instigate a food fight, Miss Kate has had enough and fires Angela. Angela storms out, with Lily following. A-Troupe celebrates.
159	5	"Summer Lovin'"	Derek Ryan	Brian Hartigan	October 6, 2018	July 20, 2018
As A-Troupe watches, Miss Kate meets with Emily and Michelle, who pitch Kate several ideas, including revenue generators, if they are restored as co-studio heads. Emily and Michelle announce to A-Troupe, "We're back!" Emily and Michelle want Finn, Kenzie and Summer to freestyle for them, as they are new to A-Troupe, and want to assess them. Piper is still nervous to dance with A-Troupe again, but is welcomed back in Studio A. Emily and Michelle announce line placements for the regionals routine, which causes much consternation when Amy, Jacquie and Richelle are put in the middle row, and Summer is placed front and centre. Finn wants to know why Piper is happy in the back row. Emily and Michelle reprimand Amy, Jacquie and Richelle for complaining about their line placements. They think Summer tattled on them, but it was Noah. Finn sees Piper by herself, soloing in Studio One, and promises to stop asking her about the back row. Jacquie asks Noah if he thinks Summer is the better dancer, and he fails to give her a direct answer. Amy apologizes to Summer who tells Amy, if she wants the front row, she needs to "come and get it".
160	6	"Mean Twirls"	Derek Ryan	Karl DiPelino	October 7, 2018	July 23, 2018
Jacquie and Richelle find each other in Studio One, and stage an impromptu dance battle/duet. Emily and Michelle enter and order them out – Studio One is being rented out. Thalia enters, and is welcomed by Emily and Michelle. Thalia is the head of AcroNation, a new studio that she has opened – Thalia reveals to Summer that AcroNation is not going to regionals this year. Emily convinces Absolute Dance to hold a convention at the Next Step by lying that the dancer Dytto will be there. Summer tells Amy about AcroNation, which gives Richelle an idea, and she and Jacquie set Summer up to miss their rehearsal, and potentially join AcroNation. Ozzy has a rivalry with B-Trouper Heath, while Winnie has a crush on Ozzy. When Summer fails to show up for rehearsal, Michelle knows something is up and sets Richelle and Jacquie up to argue. Michelle then dresses them down. Summer considers joining AcroNation. Winnie gets Ozzy to instruct her and Heath in an attempt to make Ozzy jealous, but it does not work. Richelle and Jacquie apologize to Summer. Emily smugly reports to Michelle that she got Dytto. Noah tells Jacquie that he believes in her.
161	7	"Oh Solo Me-Oh"	Mitchell Ness	Ryan Spencer	October 13, 2018	July 30, 2018
Summer, Jacquie and Richelle are rehearsing for Michelle and Emily in Studio A to determine the regionals soloist, when Kingston and Ozzy enter. Confused about the rehearsal, they ask Emily, who informs them it is for soloist and they want someone who will take it "seriously". This annoys Kingston and Ozzy. Henry, Kingston, Ozzy and Finn are in Studio A, when LaTroy enters. Kingston called LaTroy to help them "stand out" on A-Troupe. Richelle and Jacquie keep halting their rehearsal in Studio One, as they desire to perfect every move that Summer performs better than them. Irritated, Summer challenges them with more difficult choreography. Amy, disappointed at not be considered for the solo, agrees to stand in for one of Thalia's dancers. Kingston becomes extremely aggravated with Ozzy's lack of focus on dance during LaTroy's workshop. Amy enjoys working with AcroNation's dancers, including Ty. LaTroy and the other four perform their routine for Emily and Michelle, who are impressed with Henry and Kingston. The girls perform their routine, and Emily and Michelle pick Summer for the solo, and this time Richelle and Jacquie are accepting. Kingston and Henry are added to the girls' routine. Ozzy misses the old Kingston.
162	8	"Mash-Up Match-Up"	Mitchell Ness	Jan Caruana	October 14, 2018	August 6, 2018
Michelle has A-Troupe take a compatibility test and uses the results to pair dancers in a duets competition – the winner will get to be Leon Blackwood's assistant at the Absolute: Wild Styles Dance Convention. Finn is paired with a reluctant Piper, and Ozzy is paired with a resistant Richelle. Amy is paired with Henry, who insists upon running an errand before rehearsal, but they lock Henry's keys in the car and are stuck. Kingston impresses Emily and Michelle in his duet with Summer. Piper actually has fun rehearsing with Finn, until the pressure gets to her. Emily and Michelle really like the "fun" Richelle and Ozzy have during their duet. Piper goes to Summer for a favor. Amy discovers that Henry missed his prom for the qualifiers video shoot, and they work on the duet choreography in the parking lot. Summer shows up to be Finn's duet partner, and Finn is confused by Piper's actions. Finn confronts Piper, and she confesses that she is feeling a lot of pressure. Finn helps her let it go. Ozzy discovers Richelle is dating Elliot. Amy and Henry almost kiss.
163	9	"Amy's Prom Has Got It Goin' On"	Samir Rehem	Rachael Schaefer	October 20, 2018	August 13, 2018
Amy leaves a tux in Henry's locker, and tells him that she intends to throw him a prom, to make up for the one he missed. Henry wants to ask Amy, but it has to be just right. After rehearsal, Noah's "promposal" to Jacquie involves singing her a song, which makes Henry think he needs to do something bigger to ask Amy. Finn asks Piper but she brushes him off. J-Trouper Presley complains to Emily about J-Troupe not being able to go to the prom. Henry works up a 4-person routine for his promposal, but then has to lie to Amy about it when she comes across their rehearsal. Ozzy and Kingston follow Elliot, and observe him dueting with Richelle, and then see him ask Richelle to prom. Amy asks Ty from AcroNation for advice about Henry, and concludes that Henry is not interested in her. Richelle and Jacquie have gotten the same dress for prom. J-Troupe performs for Emily, and she allows them come to prom, to serve refreshments. Ty asks Amy to prom, while Emily encourages Piper to go. Ozzy confronts Elliot. Henry and company perform his elaborate promposal for Amy, but she is already going with Ty.
164	10	"Twinkle Toes"	Samir Rehem	Karen McClellan	October 21, 2018	August 20, 2018
It is the prom, and Ty wants to win Amy over by the end of the night. Noah and Jacquie arrive, followed by Piper with Ozzy and Finn, and then Emily and Michelle who come together. Richelle arrives with Elliot, wearing the same dress as Jacquie from before. Henry arrives with Summer as his date. Eldon is the prom's DJ. Winnie makes a play for an oblivious Ozzy. Jacquie and Richelle argue over the dress. Piper refuses to dance with Finn. Elliot brags to Emily and Michelle that he's now in a "critically-acclaimed musical", though Michelle points out as the "understudy". Henry attempts talk to Amy, but Ty interrupts before he gets the chance. Noah lets J-Troupe dance. Jacquie and Richelle accessorize their dresses to solve the issue. Piper finally dances with Finn. Elliot is called in to perform, so Richelle dances with Ozzy. Henry and Summer are crowned Prom King and Queen, disappointing both Henry and Amy. Amy sits alone in the locker room when Ty finds her, and she decides to stay and have fun. Richelle realizes that Winnie has a crush on Ozzy, and has them dance. Henry and Amy dance, and then everyone dances together.
165	11	"Never Been Picked"	Samir Rehem	Emma Campbell	October 27, 2018	August 27, 2018
Several A-Troupers are warming up for their rehearsal for the opening number for the Wild Stylz Dance Convention, including Amy who is standing in for Richelle who won the duet competition with Ozzy. Elliot is supervising Richelle's and Ozzy's duet rehearsal, which annoys Ozzy, and he challenges Elliot to a dance battle. Kingston has smoothies with Summer to find out how she became such a good dancer. Noah and Finn are disgusted by Jacquie's messy locker. Michelle is impressed with Amy during the rehearsal, getting Amy's hopes up that she will be added to the routine. But Michelle tells Amy that she cannot add her to the dance at this late date. Kingston helps Ozzy train for the battle. Noah cleans and organizes Jacquie's locker, but she immediately starts making it messy again. Thalia discovers there is a wildcard competition for regionals, and intends to enter AcroNation. Elliot "wipes the floor" with Ozzy in the dance battle. Amy determines from Michelle that they do not see Amy as a lead dancer. Kingston consoles Ozzy, who admits that he wants to be dancing at Kingston's level. Amy leaves The Next Step and joins AcroNation.
166	12	"Convention Tension"	Stefan Scaini	Brian Hartigan	October 28, 2018	September 3, 2018
It is the first day of the Absolute Dance Wild Stylz Convention, and Amy is set to perform as a featured dancer for AcroNation in the wildcard competition for regionals. To kick off the convention, Jacquie, Richelle, Summer, Henry and Kingston perform. Dytto comes to the studio to teach a tutting workshop, and Henry is ecstatic to be a part of it. As Jacquie tries to calm Henry down, Noah determines that they have seemingly all forgotten his birthday. Lily shows up to the workshop, after her mom got her into it, and reveals that they are now at Encore Dance, a rival regionals team. Miss Angela tries to entice Finn, Kenzie and Summer to leave The Next Step, but none are interested, and Emily shoos Angela away. With Leon Blackwood as the judge, the teams compete for the wildcard – AcroNation wins the wildcard spot for regionals. Henry tries to steal a selfie with Dytto, but she catches him and corrects him on his selfie style. With AcroNation in regionals, Amy will compete against Summer in the solos competition. Jacquie and company throw Noah a surprise eighteenth birthday party, but this presents a problem for Emily.
167	13	"Sweet and Salty"	Stefan Scaini	Rachael Schaefer	October 28, 2018	September 10, 2018
Before the solos competition, Michelle takes a moment to herself in Studio A – since becoming studio head, she has not had much time to dance. Emily enters and informs Michelle that with Noah turning 18 they either have to compete in the tougher senior advanced division at regionals, or kick Noah off the team to stay in the intermediate advanced division. As the soloists prepare to compete, Leon Blackwood is holding a workshop, which other dancers like Kenzie and Piper are attending. Richelle and Kingston, subbing in for an ill Ozzy, are Leon's assistants. At the workshop, Jacquie discovers that her sister Davis is attending. The soloists perform, with Amy going first. Leon chooses Piper, Kenzie, and Davis as his featured dancers at the workshop, which aggravates Jacquie. After Michelle shoos a boasting Angela away, Lily performs her solo, which is all "sparkle and teeth" according to Thalia. Summer performs a strong solo. Davis is offered a spot on A-Troupe. Lily wins the solos, earning her team a 5-point advantage. Richelle stands up to a bragging Lily, but Richelle declares to Summer that she would have won the solo. Emily believes she has to kick Noah off the team.
Part 2
168	14	"Ty'd to You"	Samir Rehem	Karen McClellan	March 2, 2019	September 17, 2018
A-Troupe rehearses in Studio A, with Davis having joined. Emily and Michelle still have not decided what to do about Noah. Jacquie's and Davis' dad is proud they are at the same studio. Thalia reports to Amy and Simone how regionals will operate this year, and asks Amy to be a featured dancer in each of the ballet, contemporary and hip-hop sections. Jacquie and Davis argue during practice, forcing Kenzie to take over so they will not "kill each other". Henry cannot stop talking about Amy to the guys, who tell Henry to just ask Amy out. Ty is struggling with the non-acro routines and asks Amy for help. Henry practices asking Amy out with the guys. Jacquie leaves because Davis and Kenzie are getting along great. Henry enters Studio One just as Amy and Ty kiss. Davis would rather practice with Kenzie than go to movie night with Jacquie and their dad. Henry and Amy decide that their "moment" has passed. Michelle and Emily speak with Noah again, and Emily informs Noah what his turning 18 means for regionals. They leave the decision up to Noah. Henry and Amy separately dance it out, while Summer and Ty watch.
169	15	"All the Marbles"	Stefan Scaini	Jan Caruana	March 3, 2019	September 24, 2018
Noah is directing A-Troupe practicing, but is unable to concentrate because of what Michelle and Emily told him about regionals, and is unsure about what to do. Ozzy and Kingston are practicing when Ozzy accidentally discovers Kingston is failing history in school. AcroNation dance captain Simone runs a duet rehearsal with Amy and Ty, but Simone thinks Ty should be replaced. A-Troupe is called to a team meeting in which Emily and Michelle explain what Noah's turning 18 means for the team. They will hold a secret vote, and Noah will leave the team unless the vote is unanimous for him to stay. Afterwards, A-Troupe argues about what to do. Amy tells Ty that he needs to be replaced on the duet. While A-Troupe votes, Noah waits, and dances, in Studio One. Noah receives one "No" vote, and the team argues about the vote. Amy and Simone perform their duet for an approving Thalia. Ozzy offers to be Kingston's "study buddy", but Kingston rejects the overture. Piper comes upon Noah packing to leave the studio, and he offers to help her with her aerial. Piper admits that she voted "No", but reverses her vote. Noah remains team captain.
170	16	"Less Beauty, More Beast"	Stefan Scaini	Corey Liu	March 9, 2019	October 1, 2018
As A-Troupe practices, LaTroy and Sloane enter Studio A. LaTroy and Sloane will each take a set of dancers to choreograph hip-hop, who will then face-off, with the best dancers being picked for the regionals hip-hop category. Sloane takes the boys, and LaTroy takes the girls. LaTroy calls Davis "blonde Jacquie". During Sloane's session, Kingston objects to being paired with Ozzy, disappointing the others. Henry and Summer challenge each other to rival activities if the other is picked. Davis is a nervous smiler, which is a problem as LaTroy wants "less beauty, more beast" in her performance. Jacquie rebuffs Davis when she asks for help. Noah and Finn inform a clueless Henry that he is dating Summer. Kenzie helps Davis with her lack of aggression by getting her to box. The boys remark that Kingston has changed. The boys surprise the girls with their hip-hop routine in Studio A. The girls then perform, with Davis much improved. Sloane and LaTroy pick Finn, Noah, Kenzie, Henry, Summer, and Jacquie, which crushes Kingston, Piper and Davis. Kingston turns down the movies with Finn and Noah to practice his contemporary. Henry and Summer are dating. Dance comes between Jacquie and Davis, again.
171	17	"Contemporary Contempt"	Melanie Orr	Rachael Schaefer	March 10, 2019	October 8, 2018
Michelle and Emily have chosen a select group of dancers to audition for the regionals contemporary routine – the dancers will be paired, and Noah will appraise them. Kingston and Ozzy are partnered, and Kingston admits that his "full day is just training", which confuses Ozzy because of Kingston's school struggles. Richelle is paired with Summer, who wants the dance to "tell a story", but Richelle thinks only the "moves" are important. Davis agrees to help her partner, Piper, with her aerial. Ozzy finds inconsistencies in Kingston's story. Emily and Michelle discover that Eldon is Thalia's choreographer, and Thalia reveals that AcroNation will also be competing in the senior advanced division at regionals. Ozzy discovers Kingston has been skipping school and his grades are a "disaster". Kingston swears Ozzy to secrecy. Eldon brings Emily and Michelle a peace offering, but they are suspicious. The pairings face off as Noah observes. Piper pulls out an aerial at the end of her routine, after she and Davis agreed not to do one. Noah chooses Summer, Piper, and Kingston, angering Davis and Ozzy. Noah checks on Ozzy who lies about what is bothering him. Ozzy gives Kingston an ultimatum. Eldon issues a challenge.
172	18	"Little Big Lies"	Melanie Orr	Brian Hartigan	March 16, 2019	October 15, 2018
A-Troupe gathers for an announcement from Michelle and Emily, who reveal that they have to choose the team's alternate for the regionals 10-person dance. They want four people to perform to inform their decision: Davis, Finn, Kenzie, and Ozzy. Noah runs choreo with the four, while a distracted Ozzy struggles with the Kingston dilemma. Ty wants to take Amy out, but Amy has to cancel for the third time. Noah asks for Henry's help with a game date with Jacquie and Richelle. The four perform for Emily and Michelle, but Ozzy is "off". Ty asks Simone to give Amy a night off, and Simone is unimpressed. Noah and Henry play Picture-Grams with Jacquie and Richelle, who are super-competitive. Simone challenges Amy about the time off, which angers Amy. None of the four are chosen as the alternate – Kingston is made the alternate after Ozzy tells Emily and Michelle everything. Kingston feels betrayed. Amy confronts Ty, and declares they are "better off as friends". Noah and Henry suggest "boys versus girls" in the game, which saves them. An irate Kingston confronts Ozzy, proclaiming Ozzy should not even be on the team. They dance battle, and their friendship is declared over.
173	19	"Pas De Don't"	Melanie Orr	Brad Vermunt	March 17, 2019	October 22, 2018
Richelle performs a ballet solo for Michelle and Emily, as she wants to be considered for the ballet duet with Noah. Michelle and Emily are impressed, and choose Richelle for the pas de deux. They have brought in a knowledgeable "special" ballet choreographer – it's Chloe, with her young assistant Oliver. Chloe supervises their duet rehearsal and challenges Richelle to show "more emotion". Amy is practicing for regionals when Summer enters and starts practicing too. Thalia does not think The Next Step dancers should be in Studio One right now. Finn wants to help Piper "chill out". Chloe is very impressed with Noah's performance, and informs him of an upcoming audition. Noah balks at abandoning his team before regionals, but Chloe reassures him that the production is after regionals. Richelle wonders why she was not offered the audition. Eldon tries to prevent Amy and Summer from dancing. Chloe advises Richelle that she has "lyrical eyebrows" and needs to show real emotion in her dancing if she wants to be a professional. Emily calls Miss Kate and they agree that AcroNation can no longer use Studio One as they are the competition. Noah calls to audition after Jacquie encourages him.
174	20	"Audition Subtraction"	Melanie Orr	Emma Campbell	March 23, 2019	October 29, 2018
As A-Troupe watches, Emily and Michelle meet in the office with Kingston and his mom, who is threatening to pull Kingston from the studio. They come to a deal – Kingston is off A-Troupe until his grades improve to a B-average. Emily wants to start rehearsals for the 10-person routine but Noah is not there, as he is at the audition. Jacquie attempts to stall for Noah. At the audition, Noah runs across Elliot who tries to undermine Noah's confidence, pointing out that Noah does have a picture and resume like the other auditionees. Emily calls Noah and figures out that Jacquie is stalling, and challenges Jacquie to tell the truth. Jacquie admits that Noah is at an audition. Unable to practice, A-Troupe decides to help Kingston study, except Ozzy who is still angry with Kingston. With their help, Kingston starts understanding his schoolwork. Elliot claims his audition went well. Noah auditions next, and despite being underprepared, his audition goes well. Emily arrives and drags Noah back to the studio. After talking to Finn, Ozzy decides to help Kingston too. Kingston does will in school, and is back on A-Troupe. But the alternate spot is back in play.
175	21	"Dancing with the Enemy"	Mitchell Ness	Brad Vermunt & Jan Caruana	March 24, 2019	November 6, 2018
Finn, Summer and Kenzie receive texts from Lily, who meets them in Shakes & Ladders. Lily's studio, Encore Dance, has an injured dancer, and needs a replacement featured dancer. Finn and Summer are not interested, and Kenzie considers it, but Davis overhears the conversation and accepts Lily's offer. Davis will need to audition and asks Jacquie for help. Michelle attempts to catch Noah up on choreo, but Noah already has it down, so he runs ideas by Michelle instead. Michelle misses dancing. Jacquie goes to Emily to try to get Davis a featured dance, but Emily declines. Noah is waiting to hear back on the audition, and tells Michelle about it. Ozzy and Richelle are choreographing a routine for the B-Troupe showcase, and argue about it. Winnie defends Ozzy to Richelle. Jacquie decides to help Davis with her audition. Noah observes Elliot getting a phone call, indicating Elliot got the part. Michelle counsels Noah that he should leave The Next Step after regionals. Kenzie and Jacquie argue about Davis, and Davis overhears. B-Troupe performs Ozzy's choreo for Emily, who approves. Davis leaves The Next Step. Noah remembers his time at The Next Step (with flashbacks), and contemplates leaving it.
176	22	"His Girl, Summer"	David Antoniuk	Emma Campbell & Brian Hartigan	March 30, 2019	November 13, 2018
With Davis gone to Encore Dance, Michelle and Emily announce that there will be no alternate for regionals, and that they need to rechoreograph the 10-person dance for the finals "from scratch". The dancers are to cancel any plans they have for "today and tonight", which includes Henry's and Summer's drive-in date, as they need to practice. Noah supervises the rehearsal, with Richelle declaring that she is "so excited about this dance". The routine will involve dancers hanging from 35-foot ropes. Kenzie is still argumentative with Jacquie about Davis leaving. Ozzy and Kingston realize that Finn moves his mouth when he dances, and have to record Finn dancing to prove their point. Noah is frustrated because the dancers are not focused. The ropes are delivered to Emily and Michelle, but they are 35-inches long, not 35-feet, due to a clerical error. Elliot has to go to California for his new stage production, and coldly breaks up with Richelle, devastating her. Henry and Summer take a break, which angers Noah. Richelle is distracted. Emily solves the rope issue. Noah sort of cracks under the pressure, but rehearsing the routine reassures him. Michelle and Emily are concerned about the team's unity.
177	23	"A-Troupe Escape"	David Antoniuk	Karen McClellan & Rachael Schaefer	March 31, 2019	November 20, 2018
Summer dances alone in Studio A, working through her nerves and her concerns that the team is not connecting with each other. That evening, A-Troupe is in Shakes & Ladders when they get a note from Michelle and Emily informing them that Shakes & Ladders has been turned into an "escape room", and the team must work together to get out. Miss Kate enters the studio with a man, and Michelle and Emily assume it is a date, but Kate announces that she is selling The Next Step. A-Troupe has to solve a series of clues about each member, which includes Summer finding out about Henry's past with Jacquie and Amy. Emily and Michelle are worried about Miss Kate selling the studio. Summer forgives Henry for not telling her about his past, and Jacquie and Kenzie bury the hatchet. Emily, who has always dreamed of owning a studio, resolves that she and Michelle will buy The Next Step from Miss Kate, but Michelle is unsure that this is what she wants to do with her life. The last clue is that each A-Trouper must dance like another member of the team. The escape room experience successfully rebonds the team.
178	24	"No Shell"	Mitchell Ness	Karen McClellan	April 6, 2019	November 27, 2018
The Next Step arrives at regionals. Emily and Michelle go to register, and run into Thalia and Eldon from AcroNation. Amy spies her former teammates, and confesses that she misses them and feels alone right now. Miss Angela of Encore Dance enters with Lily and Davis in tow. Giselle is Chuck Anderson's co-host for the SNR Network. The first round is hip-hop. The Next Step performs, with Angela negatively critiquing them from the wings, but they win the round, with Encore Dance in second, and AcroNation in fifth. Amy talks to Henry about Summer, and realizes she still likes him. Amy and AcroNation perform in the contemporary round, and Piper is nervous. Miss Angela tries to psych A-Troupe out, and successfully psychs out Piper who misses her aerial during their contemporary routine. The Next Step drops to fifth place, behind Encore Dance and AcroNation. Finn embarrasses himself to make Piper feel better. Noah thanks Richelle for their time together, and admits to her that he may be leaving The Next Step. The moment allows Noah, and especially Richelle, to tap into their emotions in the pas de deux. Encore Dance, AcroNation, and The Next Step advance to the finals.
179	25	"And Then There Were Three"	Mitchell Ness	Karen McClellan	April 7, 2019	November 27, 2018
Piper tells Emily and Michelle that she wants to remove the aerials from the routine, but Emily rejects the suggestion, as much as for Piper as for the team. Amy is the "star dancer" at AcroNation, but confesses that she does not feel "connected" to her team. For the finals, AcroNation performs an acrobatic routine with giant "O's" as props. Michelle admits to Amy that she was wrong about Amy being a "lead dancer". Having broken through her "emotional wall" in dance, Richelle wants to be alone, but Ozzy consoles her. Encore Dance performs, and it is not the expected "razzle-dazzle". Piper has a crisis of confidence and runs offstage. Just before performing, Emily realizes Piper is missing, and frantically looks for her. When Emily finds her, Piper says she cannot go on, but Emily convinces Piper that she has nothing left to lose. The Next Step performs a lively routine with hanging ropes. Piper hits the aerial. The Next Step and AcroNation tie for second, with Encore Dance crowned the winners. Confronted by a judge for plagiarism, Miss Angela tries to bribe him, with Lily catching her in the act. Miss Angela is removed by security.
180	26	"Piano Man"	Mitchell Ness	Rachael Schaefer	April 7, 2019	November 28, 2018
Noah comes in early to take in the regionals stage alone. Jacquie finds him there, and she knows that Noah has decided to leave The Next Step. She breaks up with Noah, as Jacquie does not want to hold Noah back. They share a final duet together in the empty theater. The two teams' studio heads declare that the tiebreaker is another 10-person routine – each team gets just two hours to prepare a new routine. While AcroNation comes up with a routine, Simone injures her wrist. Amy misses The Next Step. Summer asks Simone if she is OK, but does not believe Simone's answer. Richelle runs into Lily who admits that she was the one who exposed Miss Angela – Richelle is impressed. As Simone is too injured, Summer offers to dance with AcroNation so they do not have to forfeit. Noah informs Michelle that he is leaving The Next Step, and Michelle considers the same. AcroNation, including Summer, performs first, and use pillars in their rotuine. The Next Step performs a routine that tells the story of Noah and the team. The Next Step wins regionals. The team celebrates. Emily wants to buy the studio, but Michelle wants to talk.

=== Christmas special (2019) ===
No. overall	Title	Directed by	Written by	Original Can. air date	Original UK air date
181	"It's a Wonderful Life, Piper"	Derby Crewe	Karen McClellan	December 21, 2019	December 13, 2019
182	"It's a Wonderful Life, Piper"	Derby Crewe	Rachael Schaefer	December 21, 2019	December 13, 2019
Rehearsal is under way for a very special holiday performance of The Nutcracker. Piper feels invisible after James and the original A-Troupe return to TNS and wishes she never came to the studio in the first place. Her wish is granted when Giselle, as a fairy, appears and guides her through a miserable studio. It's a very different TNS where A-Troupers from past and present are almost unrecognizable. Piper realizes the ripple effect her life has had on the studio, but it may be too late after Alfie reveals his plan to turn TNS into a luxury hotel. However, Piper scrambles to reignite the love of dance in everyone before she's trapped in the alternate timeline forever. After enlisting Finn's help to gather the new A-Troupers, Piper sets her sights on triggering happy memories for the original A-Troupe and reuniting James and Riley.

=== Season 7 (2020) ===
No. overall	No. in season	Title	Directed by	Written by	Original Can. air date	Original UK air date
Part 1
183	1	"The Goodbye Girl"	Stefan Scaini	Rachael Schaefer	April 10, 2020	January 8, 2020
A-Troupe enters Studio A after winning regionals. Noah has left The Next Step, as has Jacquie. Richelle is the most senior dancer remaining, Piper's confidence is back, and Amy has returned. Michelle is leaving the studio, and Emily is taking it poorly and feels betrayed. Miss Kate has sold the studio, so Emily is simply a studio head again. A-Troupe is planning a surprise going-away party for Michelle. Nick is the new studio owner. Richelle is the new face of Absolute Dance, and Kenzie thinks it has gone to her head. Someone defaces Richelle's poster. Nick tries to convince Emily to attend Michelle's party. Kenzie asks Michelle for help with a dance, but Emily insists that Nick do it. Ozzy gets B-Troupe to guard Richelle's posters. Richelle recreates Michelle's solo audition dance from season 1, then A-Troupe performs a mashup of Michelle's previous Next Step dance routines. Emily has an uncontrolled outburst over Michelle's leaving, and destroys Michelle's old costumes. Nick takes A-Troupe away to Studio One, where Kenzie admits she defaced Richelle's poster but wants to replace Jacquie as Richelle's "frenemy". Michelle and Emily tearfully reconcile. Lily enters, wanting to audition for A-Troupe. Michelle leaves The Next Step.
184	2	"The Comeback Kid"	Stefan Scaini	Karen McClellan	April 17, 2020	January 15, 2020
Henry finds Summer using fortune-telling cards, when Lily unexpectedly enters Studio A, surprising them. Emily announces that Lily is there to audition for the "final spot" on A-Troupe. Lily's audition solo impresses Summer and Amy, but Richelle and Kenzie are skeptical. A-Troupe argue over admitting Lily to the team. Lily waits in The Next Steep (formerly Shakes & Ladders), and Emily stops by to tell Lily she needs to be persistent if she "really wants this". Ozzy is chosen to dance with Lily to further appraise her. Kenzie and Richelle think that Lily is a spy, and intend to check in on Miss Angela's workshop at Encore Dance. Ozzy tests Lily during their duet rehearsal, and Lily passes. Richelle and Kenzie discover that there are no dancers at Encore Dance, and Miss Angela is a pariah who is on probation. Angela admits that she sent Lily to The Next Step as it is what is best for Lily. Lily overhears the team doubting her trustworthiness. Richelle and Kenzie report their findings back to the team. Lily is about to leave, but Ozzy and A-Troupe convinces her stay. Emily thinks Michelle has not totally left The Next Step after all.
185	3	"Alternate Universe"	Stefan Scaini	Brian Hartigan	April 24, 2020	January 22, 2020
Nick and Emily are holding auditions with B-Troupe and others for the alternate spot on A-Troupe, though Emily still thinks alternates are a bad idea. Ozzy makes his sister Izzy audition to try to prevent Heath from getting the spot. Winnie confesses that Ozzy decided that they should just be friends. Cleo is auditioning after her old studio lost regionals. Jude has never auditioned before. Presley impresses Richelle. Nick keeps interrupting Emily who is trying to run the audition. Richelle, Summer and Kenzie are the dance captain candidates. The auditions start off with freestyle solos. Dancers who make it past the first cut are paired with one of the dance captain candidates for a trios routine. Ozzy interrupts Richelle's team's choreo, to give Izzy "notes", but Richelle shoos him away. Jude is unable to learn Kenzie's choreo so fast. The group dances are performed, and Jude falls behind in hers. Emily announces the alternates: Cleo and Heath. Ozzy is horrified, and embarrasses Izzy. Presley vows to find another troupe to get to nationals. Cleo tries to encourage a disappointed Jude. Emily announces Summer is the dance captain, disappointing Richelle and Kenzie. Emily feels the team is ready for nationals.
186	4	"Three's a Crowd"	Stefan Scaini	Amy Cole	May 1, 2020	January 29, 2020
Richelle practices alone in Studio One. Cleo enters, and sucks up to Richelle. Summer runs a rehearsal in Studio A on her first day as dance captain. Nick announces that Heath will be the understudy for the small group nationals dance, disgusting Ozzy. Amy tries to spend time with Piper, but Piper keeps getting texts from Finn. Amy does not understand Piper's friendship with Finn, so Piper wants them to hang out together. Heath challenges Ozzy during rehearsal, irritating Summer. Piper's lunch with Amy and Finn does not go well. Heath subs in, and Henry and Ozzy are not getting Summer's choreo. Summer loses control, as Ozzy and Heath dance battle, and Nick has to break it up, and reprimands Summer. Nick makes Ozzy and Heath spend the day together as punishment. Cleo prompts Richelle to ask Finn what is bothering him, and Richelle offers Finn advice. Amy does not want to be Finn's friend, but realizes that she may be jealous of him, and apologizes to Piper and Finn. Ozzy and Heath come up with a duet to impress Nick. Cleo gets Richelle to choreo a routine. Nick suggests that Summer cut Henry from the dance.
187	5	"Good Night and Good Luck"	Steve Wright	Jan Caruana	May 8, 2020	February 5, 2020
With a thunderstorm raging outside, Summer is holding a small groups rehearsal. Henry still struggles to pick up the choreo. Nick wants to dry off, and then observe the routine. The power goes out. Summer sends Heath off to rehearse, so she can work choreo with Henry alone. Heath comes across Izzy in Studio One, and they bond. Ozzy, Kingston and Lily determine that the power is only out in the studio, and decide to investigate. Summer cannot bring herself to tell Henry the truth about their practicing. Lily, Ozzy and Kingston discover that the power was shut off on purpose, so everyone at the studio becomes a suspect. Izzy wants to know why Heath and Ozzy are "archenemies". Over Summer's objections, Henry thinks the rest of the group should return to practice. Kenzie and Henry are interrogated, and found innocent. Heath helps Izzy practice dancing and Ozzy discovers them, and commands Izzy to not be friends with Heath. Henry accuses Summer of cutting the power, and she admits the truth to Henry, who is hurt that Summer was not honest with him. Izzy confronts Ozzy. Summer demonstrates the routine to Nick, who approves. But Henry is still upset.
188	6	"The Favourite"	Steve Wright	Brad Vermunt	May 15, 2020	February 12, 2020
Nick announces that Summer will be picking the male soloist for nationals from Henry, Kingston and Ozzy. Henry is concerned as he and Summer are not in a good place. Piper has to cancel on Amy and Finn, and encourages them to hang out. Cleo is asked to run a B-Troupe rehearsal, and finds Jude there. But Jude still cannot pick up choreo, and when Cleo challengers her, Jude walks out. The soloists perform for Summer. Amy's lunch with Finn starts awkwardly, but she discovers Finn is a "revenge tea-aphile" which she finds interesting. Summer chooses Henry as the soloist, which Kingston and Ozzy expected. Henry is bothered by the perception that he was not chosen soloist on merit. Finn teaches Amy about high tea. Jude returns to explain herself to Cleo, and admits she has dyslexia. Henry goes to Nick for a second opinion, but Nick exposes Henry's request to Summer. Summer is frustrated with Henry questioning her decisions, but Henry does not trust them right now. Piper returns to find Amy and Finn have bonded, and feels left out. Jude asks Cleo for help with learning choreo. Henry apologizes, but Summer wants to break up.
189	7	"A Star is Born"	Mitchell T Ness	Jan Caruana	May 22, 2020	February 19, 2020
Nick calls Henry, Summer, Piper, Kingston and Lily in. Henry is distracted by the break-up with Summer, and he tries to talk to her, but she is noncommittal. Nick wants The Next Step to be on the TV show Dancemania, and invites TV personality Nova to the studio to run a workshop on developing the dancers' TV presence, though the dancers are unaware of the TV aspect. Nick insists on doing "trust exercises" with Emily. The dancers solo for Jade, who concludes they are all "hiding" parts of themselves. Jade gives the dancers honest feedback. Kingston has to leave for home. Jade wants the dancers to solo again, but with Summer critiquing. Nick has Emily play "two truths, and a lie". Nova wonders if Summer is so desperate to be liked that she is unable to give criticism, telling her she needs to be more than a "cheerleader". Summer starts giving honest critiques, but Henry blows up at her for it. Henry thinks their break-up should be permanent. Emily does not want a "partnership" with Nick. Jade gets the dancers "reality TV ready". Emily concludes Nick is not so bad. Jade reveals the Dancemania audition to the dancers.
190	8	"The Bicycle Thief"	Mitchell T Ness	Brian Hartigan	May 29, 2020	February 26, 2020
The dancers are talking about Dancemania. Emily feels it is interfering with their focus on nationals, and forces Nick to tell the dancers, but Nick fails. Finn wants Piper to say "yes" to everything that day. Emily brings Eldon in to choreograph Lily's and Kingston's nationals duet. Nick claims he can choreograph, but he cannot. Finn asks Amy to "hang out", on a date, and she says yes. During their rehearsal with Eldon, Lily and Kingston argue. Nick tries to choreograph Amy, Cleo, Kenzie, Summer and Ozzy, who become convinced that he is deliberately sabotaging their routine because Emily does not want them on Dancemania. Nick lies, and says it was a test. Finn asks Piper for help on his date and Piper is forced to say yes. Kingston and Lily make up, which frustrates Eldon with their resulting dancing. Summer eavesdrops on Nick, and discovers he cannot choreograph. Eldon lies to Kingston and Lily to get them fighting, to restore their duet's passion. Summer covers for Nick, and Emily is impressed with routine. Finn and Amy go off on their date, and Piper feels "weird". Lily kisses Kingston, which Ozzy witnesses. Piper realizes she likes Finn.
191	9	"The Fall of Summer"	Nikila Cole	Amy Cole	June 5, 2020	March 4, 2020
Summer is blindsided after Richelle returns from an Absolute Dance convention and changes the choreo for a routine. A-Troupe votes on which choreo they prefer, which leads to a stunning result. Uncovering a blossoming romance, Ozzy is asked by the couple to keep it secret, which Ozzy is more than happy to do as long as they're willing to do whatever he asks. Meanwhile, Heath feels like an outsider and Cleo encourages him to step out on his own.
192	10	"A Tale of Two Auditions"	Nikila Cole	Rachael Schaefer	June 12, 2020	March 11, 2020
A-Troupe gathers for the preliminary audition for Dancemania. Kingston and Lily have "broken up", but it does not last. Heath enters, announcing that Summer is not coming. Ozzy is chastised by Dancemania judge Fredrico for taking pictures on set. A-Troupe performs their audition routine, which is centered on Richelle. Summer then enters to perform a solo audition, shocking her teammates. A-Troupe returns to Studio A, upset about Summer's audition, with Richelle ranting. Kingston and Lily argue and break up again. Piper spies Amy and Henry clowning around, which makes her wonder. Kingston and Lily reconcile again. Piper asks Amy about Henry, leaving Amy confused. A man cuts in front of Ozzy at The Next Steep, annoying Ozzy, but he recognizes an appreciative Richelle. Ozzy challenges the man to a dance battle. Kingston recognizes the man as Jones, the season 12 finalist on Dancemania. Kingston and Richelle back Ozzy up in the dance battle. Piper warns Finn about getting too attached to Amy. Ozzy and company lose the dance battle. Amy figures out that Piper likes Finn, just as Summer enters and is confronted by everyone. Summer counters that they all betrayed her with Richelle's routine. Dancemania calls.
193	11	"There Can Only Be One"	Derek Ryan	Karen McClellan	June 19, 2020	March 18, 2020
A-Troupe waits to hear about Dancemania's phone call to Amy – Amy reports that they are on Dancemania. Summer gets a phone call, and is informed she did not get on to the show. Emily warns A-Troupe that doing both nationals and Dancemania will be a lot of work, but is clear that nationals are the priority. Piper is avoiding Finn. Cleo is outraged that Summer chose Heath over her. Piper reassures Amy, by lying about liking Finn. Henry is honest with Kingston about thinking that Kingston and Lily are horrible together. Summer feels isolated. Finn thinks Piper is acting weird. Emily realizes that competing on Dancemania means A-Troupe will be considered professional dancers, they will be ineligible for nationals, and their careers as competitive dancers are over. A-Troupe has a big decision to make. Amy admits to Finn that she thought Piper might have feelings for him. Kingston and Lily are back together, and she is angry with Henry, who is forced to apologize. Finn figures out that Piper likes him. Summer tells A-Troupe that they should do Dancemania. Emily is crushed. Cleo feels betrayed by Summer. Richelle thanks Summer. Finn gets Piper to admit the truth, and kisses her.
Part 2
194	12	"Lights, Camera, Action!"	Derek Ryan	Karen McClellan	June 26, 2020	May 20, 2020
A-Troupe reminisce about recent events. Sean from Dancemania arrives in Studio A to film rehearsal, and directs the dancers to choreograph group dances. Angela stops by and introduces herself to Nick, but he realizes it is all a ruse and Angela wants to be caught by Dancemania's cameras. Winnie and Ethan accidentally come across Summer practicing alone in Studio One, and Ethan brusquely asks Summer to leave as B-Troupe rehearsal is about to begin. Cleo, now on B-Troupe, enters and exchanges words with Summer. Jude asks Summer to stay, but Cleo objects, so Summer leaves. Ozzy and Heath argue during rehearsal and on camera. Jude challenges Cleo about Cleo's treatment of Summer. Richelle's group dance concept hits too close to home for Piper and Finn. Angela and Nick engage in a battle of Dancemania TV show trivia. Sean wants the groups to perform their dances for the camera, and is pleased with the results, though the routine is too personal for Piper and Finn. Nick asks Angela to come on as a coach. Cleo asks Summer to join B-Troupe, as Cleo wants to take B-Troupe to nationals in place of A-Troupe.
195	13	"A Fine Showmance"	Shelagh O'Brien	Jan Caruana & Michael Hanley	July 3, 2020	May 27, 2020
Amy is feeling down because she will miss her family's annual camping trip for Dancemania. Finn tries to make Amy feel better, poorly, so Amy leaves. Lily and Kenzie are working on some choreo for Dancemania. Lily tells Kenzie that her mom does not know about Kingston, as Lily is not allowed to date, and swears Kenzie to secrecy. Kingston almost reveals his relationship with Lily to Angela, but they all lie and say Kingston is dating Kenzie. Angela wants to make them a "showmance" on Dancemania. Henry learns that Amy will be missing her family's annual camping trip, and advises Finn to make a "grand gesture", by taking Amy camping in Studio A. Ozzy and Izzy are working on a duet for their school's dance competition, but start arguing. Lily continues to have the others lie Angela, though Kingston reveals why he likes Lily. Ozzy realises Izzy is talented, and makes up with her. Henry cheers Amy up. Kingston and Kenzie perform a romantic duet for Angela, and Lily cannot take it and reveals she is dating Kingston. Angela forbids it, but later relents. Amy has fun camping with Finn, but realises that Henry was the reason why.
196	14	"B-Troupe, Best Troupe!"	Shelagh O'Brien	Rachael Schaefer	July 10, 2020	June 3, 2020
B-Troupe is rehearsing in Studio A, as A-Troupe does not use it on Tuesdays, with Summer and Cleo in charge. Cleo believes their chances at nationals hinge on performing a perfect dance routine for the head of Absolute Dance. Emily is happy with Summer's and Cleo's plan to take B-Troupe to nationals. Richelle enters, and is territorial about Studio A, but Izzy makes a deal to teach Richelle Spanish in return for using Studio A. Jude is having trouble picking up the choreo, but Cleo assures her they will have a week to learn it. Emily informs B-Troupe that she has successfully arranged for Gavin, the head of Absolute Dance, to come to the studio, that day. Jude still struggles with the choreo. Summer goes to Richelle for advice, and Richelle advises Summer to take Jude off the dance. Summer pulls Jude from the routine. Jude is crushed, and Cleo is angry about the decision. Emily informs Gavin that Richelle will be on Dancemania. B-Troupe performs, with Jude given a single freestyle solo. Gavin of Absolute Dance allows B-Troupe to compete at nationals. Richelle is impressed with Summer. Gavin fires Richelle as the face of Absolute Dance.
197	15	"The Absolute Face of Funder Bros"	Marni Banack	Brad Vermunt & Justin Rawana	July 17, 2020	June 10, 2020
As Nick destroys Richelle's Absolute Dance posters in her presence, Summer enters. Nick announces that Summer is the new face of Absolute Dance. Richelle is annoyed. Finn and Piper try to "act normal" after the kiss, but Piper wants to tell Amy. Finn thinks that is selfish. Fed up with Kingston constantly cancelling on them for Lily, Henry, Ozzy, and Heath decide they need to find a new "bro", and interview Pete. Richelle is depressed. Ethan demands to be interviewed for bro. Piper tries to confess to Amy, but Amy wants to discuss Finn, believing there is a problem in their relationship. Amy asks Piper if she should break up with Finn. Nick wants to be interviewed for bro. Nick has to work a B-Troupe rehearsal around the depressed Richelle who is lying on the Studio A floor. Summer enters with her new Absolute Dance posters. Richelle starts to cry, and Nick tries to console her. Ethan, Pete and Marcus form their own bro squad. Amy tells Finn she wants to break up. Finn agrees. Nick gets the bros to challenge Richelle off the floor, who want her as their fourth "bro". Piper confesses to Amy, who is outraged.
198	16	"The Friendly Skies"	Marni Banack	Brad Vermunt	July 24, 2020	June 17, 2020
Piper tells Finn that Amy never wants to see her again, so they can never be together. Heath announces that he cannot go to Dancemania – he is afraid of flying. Piper writes Amy an apology letter, but Amy crumples it up. Kingston and Ozzy try to help Heath get over his fear of flying, though Ozzy gives Heath a hard time. Henry is choreographing a routine for Dancemania in Studio A, when Amy enters, upset about Piper and Finn. Amy offers to help Henry, to get her mind off things. Amy enters the locker room and finds Finn, who apologizes to her, in front of Kingston and Heath. Amy confesses the details to Henry. Ozzy and Kingston take Heath through a mock plane boarding and flight. Amy talks things over with Henry, and mentions a "moment", upsetting Henry. Henry tells Amy the story of his choreographed routine, and she figures out it is their story. Nick interrupts another "moment", and Henry and Amy show him their routine. Nick approves. Amy forgives Piper, telling Piper that she should be with Finn. Heath gets over his fear of flying. Piper and Finn are together, as are Amy and Henry, who kiss.
199	17	"Eight Crazy Dates"	Marni Banack	La Smith	July 31, 2020	June 24, 2020
Henry and Amy are about to have their first date. But Emily informs them that Dancemania rejected their first-round song, so they must start over and come up with a new routine by "end of day". Henry pays Izzy $20 to guard the table at The Next Steep for his date. Henry and Amy are trying to pick a new song, when Finn invites himself and Piper on a "double date" with them. More dancers arrive demanding input on the song. Jude delivers an unsigned package to Emily from a secret admirer, whom Emily thinks is Nick. Henry and Amy are forced to have a dance battle with various A-Troupers to choose the song. Izzy tricks Jude into guarding the table. Lily and Kingston are now part of the "triple date". The groups perform, but it is still a tie. Another gift is left for Emily. Richelle and Heath get in on the date. Cleo reads Jude's tea leaves, telling her that "someone special" is going to come into her life. Emily confronts Nick, but he is not her secret admirer. Amy and Henry have their date, alone, in Studio A. Emily's secret admirer is Michelle.
200	18	"Just Duet"	Marni Banack	Amy Cole	August 7, 2020	July 1, 2020
Nick summons A-Troupe to discuss Dancemania's resurrection round, and assigns duets to audition for the privilege. Kingston and Richelle battle over who should be the soloist. Nick is handling the "extra load" while Emily meets with Michelle, and rushes into Studio One to meet with B-Troupe, assigning them a small group dance with the "required elements", but they do not know what that is. Kingston and Richelle dance battle for the solo. Michelle and Emily catch up, with Emily saying that the studio has turned into "a soap" since Michelle left. Michelle wants Emily to look over her contract for her new tour, and have Emily negotiate for her. Richelle and Kingston dance battle for Nick. Summer needs the nationals rule book, and cannot find it. B-Troupe perform for Nick, who chastises them for not doing the correct dance style, though he never told them. Michelle shows Emily her tour routine, and Emily realizes she misses Michelle. Nick appraises the duets. Summer demands that Nick give B-Troupe his attention. Nick chooses Richelle and Kingston, for the duet. Michelle wants to create a tour together with Emily, who is uncertain that she is ready to leave The Next Step.
201	19	"Big Decisions"	Derby Crewe	Brian Hartigan	August 14, 2020	July 8, 2020
202	20	"Dance, Dance, Resurrection"	Derby Crewe	Karen McClellan & Rachael Schaefer	August 21, 2020	July 15, 2020
203	21	"Room Service"	Mitchell T. Ness	Rachael Schaefer	August 28, 2020	July 22, 2020
204	22	"And So It Begins"	Mitchell T. Ness	Karen McClellan	September 4, 2020	July 29, 2020
205	23	"Play It Again, Finn"	Mitchell T. Ness	Rachael Schaefer	September 11, 2020	August 5, 2020
206	24	"It All Comes Down to This"	Mitchell T. Ness	Karen McClellan	September 18, 2020	August 12, 2020

=== Season 8 (2022) ===
No. overall	No. in season	Title	Directed by	Written by	Original Can. air date	Original UK air date
Part 1
207	1	"Today for You, Tomorrow for Me"	Derby Crewe	Amy Cole	September 26, 2022	September 26, 2022
208	2	"Journey to the Past"	Derby Crewe	Brad Vermunt	September 27, 2022	September 26, 2022
209	3	"I Can Do That"	Derby Crewe	Michael Hanley	September 28, 2022	September 26, 2022
210	4	"Another Suitcase in Another Hall"	Derby Crewe	Amy Cole; Michael Hanley	September 29, 2022	September 26, 2022
211	5	"I Dreamed a Dream"	Marni Banack	Duana Taha	September 30, 2022	September 26, 2022
212	6	"Never Had a Friend Like Me"	Marni Banack	Brandon Hackett	October 3, 2022	September 26, 2022
213	7	"Perfect for You"	Marni Banack	Romeo Candido	October 4, 2022	September 26, 2022
214	8	"My Philosophy"	Marni Banack	Michael Hanley and Kristen Lambie	October 5, 2022	September 26, 2022
215	9	"When I Grow Up"	Shelagh O'Brien	Brad Vermunt	October 6, 2022	September 26, 2022
216	10	"The Movie in My Mind"	Shelagh O'Brien	Jan Caruana	October 10, 2022	September 26, 2022
217	11	"Tomorrow"	Shelagh O'Brien	Michael Hanley and Kristen Lambie	October 11, 2022	September 26, 2022
218	12	"You Can't Stop the Beat"	Romeo Candido	Brandon Hackett	October 12, 2022	September 26, 2022
219	13	"One Song Glory"	Romeo Candido	Amy Cole	October 13, 2022	September 26, 2022
Part 2
220	14	"What'd I Miss?"	Romeo Candido	Romeo Candido	November 7, 2022	November 7, 2022
221	15	"Take Me or Leave Me"	Romeo Candido	Duana Taha	November 8, 2022	November 7, 2022
222	16	"Anything You Can Do"	Shawn Gerrard	Brad Vermunt	November 9, 2022	November 7, 2022
223	17	"How Do You Solve a Problem Like Maria?"	Shawn Gerrard	Michael Hanley	November 10, 2022	November 7, 2022
224	18	"Climbing Uphill"	Shawn Gerrard	Duana Taha	November 11, 2022	November 7, 2022
225	19	"Worse Things"	Shawn Gerrard	Amy Cole	November 14, 2022	November 7, 2022
226	20	"Any Dream Will Do"	Nicole Stamp	Jan Caruana	November 15, 2022	November 7, 2022
227	21	"Maybe This Time"	Nicole Stamp	Brad Vermunt	November 16, 2022	November 7, 2022
228	22	"History Has Its Eyes on You"	Nicole Stamp	Jan Caruana	November 17, 2022	November 7, 2022
229	23	"All That's Known"	Mitchell T. Ness	Emma Campbell and Michaela Kim	November 18, 2022	November 7, 2022
230	24	"What I Did for Love"	Mitchell T. Ness	Duana Taha	November 21, 2022	November 7, 2022
231	25	"Crossing a Bridge"	Mitchell T. Ness	Amy Cole	November 22, 2022	November 7, 2022
232	26	"Defying Gravity – Part 1"	Mitchell T. Ness	Amy Cole and Andrée Bagosy	November 23, 2022	November 7, 2022
233	27	"Defying Gravity – Part 2"	Mitchell T. Ness	Amy Cole	November 24, 2022	November 7, 2022

=== Season 9 (2024) ===
No. overall	No. in season	Title	Directed by	Written by	Original Can. air date	Original UK air date
Part 1
234	1	"Count Me In"	Mitchell T. Ness	Amy Cole	May 13, 2024	April 7, 2024
235	2	"Tutu Can Play That Game"	Mitchell T. Ness	Romeo Candido	May 13, 2024	April 9, 2024
236	3	"Setting the Barre"	Mitchell T. Ness	Amy Cole	May 13, 2024	April 10, 2024
237	4	"Tapped Out"	Mitchell T. Ness	Romeo Candido	May 13, 2024	April 11, 2024
238	5	"Bad Attitude"	Shelagh O'Brien	Emma Campbell	May 20, 2024	April 12, 2024
239	6	"Break Down"	Shelagh O'Brien	Brad Vermunt	May 20, 2024	April 15, 2024
240	7	"An Internationals Twist"	Shelagh O'Brien	Duana Taha	May 20, 2024	April 16, 2024
241	8	"Bridge the Gap"	Shelagh O'Brien	Jan Caruana	May 20, 2024	April 17, 2024
242	9	"Off Balance"	Nicole Stamp	Emma Campbell	May 27, 2024	April 18, 2024
243	10	"Beat the System"	Nicole Stamp	Brad Vermunt	May 27, 2024	April 19, 2024
244	11	"Swing Vote"	Nicole Stamp	Amy Cole	May 27, 2024	April 19, 2024
Part 2
245	12	"Takes Two to Tango"	Nicole Stamp	Duana Taha	May 27, 2024	April 26, 2024
246	13	"Pointe of No Return"	Samatha Wan	Jan Caruana	June 3, 2024	April 26, 2024
247	14	"How'd it Turn Out?"	Samatha Wan	Emma Campbell	June 3, 2024	May 3, 2024
248	15	"Waltz Back In"	Samatha Wan	Brad Vermunt	June 3, 2024	May 3, 2024
249	16	"Just Duet"	Samatha Wan	Duana Taha	June 3, 2024	May 10, 2024
250	17	"That's a Stretch"	Romeo Candido	Jan Caruana	June 10, 2024	May 10, 2024
251	18	"Split the Difference"	Romeo Candido	Romeo Candido and Tony Tran	June 10, 2024	May 17, 2024
252	19	"Dance, Party!"	Romeo Candido	Jan Caruana and Mona Hersi	June 10, 2024	May 17, 2024
253	20	"Can-Can We Do This?"	Mitchell T. Ness	Brad Vermunt and Andree Bergosy	June 10, 2024	May 24, 2024
254	21	"Sole Connection"	Mitchell T. Ness	Amy Cole	June 17, 2024	May 24, 2024
255	22	"Take the Leap"	Mitchell T. Ness	Amy Cole	June 17, 2024	May 24, 2024

=== Season 10 (2025) ===
No. overall	No. in season	Title	Directed by	Written by	Original Can. air date	Original UK air date
Part 1
256	1	"Veiled Victories"	Mitchell T. Ness	Amy Cole	June 30, 2025	June 23, 2025
257	2	"Dreamers in Tune"	Mitchell T. Ness	Romeo Candido	June 30, 2025	June 24, 2025
258	3	"Find Our Way"	Mitchell T. Ness	Jan Caruana	July 14, 2025	June 25, 2025
259	4	"All We Need"	Mitchell T. Ness	Brad Vermunt	July 14, 2025	June 26, 2025
260	5	"The Big Storm"	Shelagh O'Brien	Amy Cole	July 21, 2025	June 27, 2025
261	6	"Do It for Myself"	Andrée Bagosy	Romeo Candido	July 21, 2025	June 30, 2025
262	7	"Game Face"	Shelagh O'Brien	Duana Taha	July 28, 2025	July 2, 2025
263	8	"Inside Out"	Shelagh O'Brien	Mona Hersi	July 28, 2025	July 2, 2025
264	9	"Let’s Dance Tonight"	Romeo Candido	Brad Vermunt	August 4, 2025	July 3, 2025
265	10	"Super Massive Mega Star"	Romeo Candido	Amy Cole	August 4, 2025	July 4, 2025
Part 2
266	11	"Hard to Live"	Romeo Candido	Duana Taha	October 13, 2025	July 12, 2025
267	12	"To the Wolves"	Romeo Candido	Jan Caruana	October 13, 2025	July 12, 2025
268	13	"The Comeback"	Shelagh O'Brien	Brad Vermunt	October 20, 2025	July 12, 2025
269	14	"Take Control"	Duana Taha	Duana Taha	October 20, 2025	July 12, 2025
270	15	"They Say Love"	Amy Cole	Amy Cole	October 27, 2025	July 12, 2025
271	16	"The Music Made Me Do It"	Shelagh O'Brien	Jan Caruana	October 27, 2025	July 12, 2025
272	17	"Always Dramatic"	Romeo Candido	Brad Vermunt & Jan Caruana	November 3, 2025	July 12, 2025
273	18	"Got Your Back"	Romeo Candido	Duana Taha	November 3, 2025	July 12, 2025
274	19	"End of the Road"	Mitchel T. Ness, CSC	Carly Denure & Amy Cole	November 10, 2025	July 12, 2025
275	20	"Finale"	Mitchell T. Ness, CSC	Amy Cole	November 10, 2025	July 12, 2025
