= Batman: The Audio Adventures =

Scripted podcast from DC Entertainment

- Genre: Superhero, comedy
- Language: English

Creative team
- Written by: Dennis McNicholas
- Directed by: Dennis McNicholas

Cast and voices
- Voices: Jeffrey Wright; Chris Parnell; Ike Barinholtz; Rosario Dawson; Brent Spiner; Jason Sudeikis

Music
- Composed by: Doug Bossi

Production
- Production: Blue Ribbon Content, Insurrection Media, Inc.
- Length: 24–51 minutes

Publication
- No. of seasons: 2
- No. of episodes: 20
- Original release: September 18, 2021
- Provider: HBO Max

Related
- Website: www.hbomax.com/batman-audio-adventures

Batman: The Audio Adventures is a comedic radio drama podcast series featuring the DC Comics character Batman. The 2021 show, DC's first scripted podcast, is produced by DC Entertainment, Blue Ribbon Content, and HBO Max. The series is meant to be an homage to the original 1966 Batman TV series as well as the 1992 Batman: The Animated Series. It is directed and written by Dennis McNicholas, a writer for Saturday Night Live, and features many of that show's performers in voice roles. Production companies involved with the series are Insurrection Media and WarnerMedia. The series is executive produced by Kiliaen Van Rensselaer, Deborah Henderson, and Jon Berg.

Season 2 was released on October 7, 2022, and consists of 10 episodes. There is currently no word yet on the release of Season 3, as of 2026, although fans continue to request for the release of the third season.

== Premise ==
Season 1: For the first time, Batman is being deputized as an official member of the Gotham City Police Department. Meanwhile, Two-Face begins losing control over which of his split personalities is the dominant one. The Joker begins to set a diabolical plan into motion while The Riddler escapes from Arkham Asylum.

Season 2: After experiencing Joker's Dark Purple Dawn, Harley Quinn begins her quest to find true love with the Clown Prince of crime. Meanwhile, Penguin begins war against the Gotham City Police Department with the legal genius of former DA, Two-Face. Catwoman finds herself in danger and Scarecrow reaps a harvest of terror.

== Voice cast ==
- Jeffrey Wright as Bruce Wayne/Batman
- Chris Parnell as Narrator
- Ike Barinholtz as Two-Face/Harvey Dent
- Rosario Dawson as Catwoman
- Brent Spiner as The Joker
- Jason Sudeikis as Hamilton Hill
- Brooke Shields as Vicki Vale
- Gillian Jacobs as Harley Quinn
- John Leguizamo as The Riddler/Edward Nygma
- Kenan Thompson as Commissioner Gordon
- Bradley Whitford as Dr. Jonathan Crane/Scarecrow
- Bobby Moynihan as The Penguin/Oswald Cobblepot and Bat-Mite
- Seth Meyers as Jack Ryder
- Alan Tudyk as Alfred Pennyworth
- Melissa Villaseñor as Dick Grayson/Robin
- Tim Meadows as Jeremiah Arkham
- Fred Armisen as King Scimitar
- Heidi Gardner as Miss Tuesday
- Gillian Jacobs as Harley Quinn
- Ray Wise as Announcer
- Paul Scheer as Mr. Charleyhorse

Additional voices include Ben Rodgers, Aristotle Athari, Toby Huss, Steve Higgins, Paula Pell, and Ellis Hall.

== Tie-in comics ==
- Batman: The Audio Adventures Special: A direct prequel comic, released by DC Comics on October 12, 2021. Among its writers are Dennis McNicholas, Bobby Moynihan, Heidi Gardner, Paul Scheer with art by Leonardo Romero, Juni Ba, Anthony Marques, J. Bone, German Peralta, Emma Kubert, Jon Mikel, Derec Donovan, Jacob Edgar, Jesus Hervas and Rich Ellis.
- Batman: The Audio Adventures: A seven-issue monthly sequel miniseries released by DC Comics, authored by McNicholas, with art by Anthony Marques. The first issue was released on September 27, 2022, in the US. Set just after the events of the podcast, Batman must now deal with the machinations of Ra's al Ghul and his League of Assassins as well as a Killer Croc who has been adversely affected by the Joker's "dark purple dawn", among other problems in the infamous underbelly of Gotham City.
