= St. Benedict Catholic Secondary School (Cambridge, Ontario) =

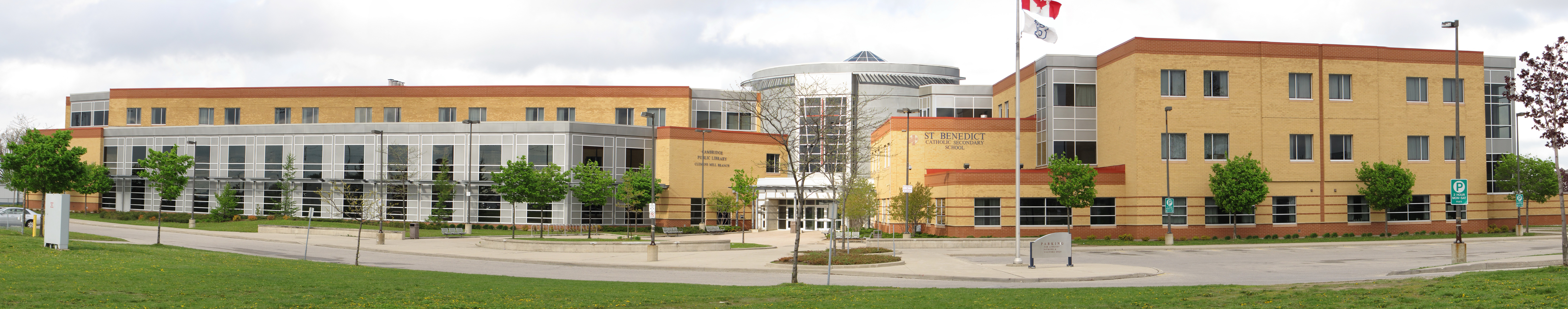

Location
- 50 Saginaw Parkway; Cambridge, Ontario, N1R 5W1; Canada; 43.3912°N 80.3014°W

Information
- School type: Public, Separate
- Motto: A Celebration of People
- Religious affiliation: Roman Catholic
- Opened: September 1997
- School board: Waterloo Catholic District School Board
- Principal: Mr. Figueiredo
- Grades: 9-12
- Enrollment: 1800 (September 2021)
- Language: English
- Area: St. Patrick Parish, Cambridge
- Campus type: Suburban
- Colours: Blue, White and Gold
- Mascot: Benny the St. Bernard
- Team name: Saints
- Feeder schools: Christ the King C.E.S. Our Lady of Fatima C.E.S. St. Elizabeth C.E.S. St. Gabriel C.E.S. St. Joseph C.E.S. St. Margaret C.E.S. St. Michael C.E.S. St. Peter C.E.S. St. Teresa of Calcutta C.E.S. Clemens Mill P.S.
- Website: stbenedict.wcdsb.ca

St. Benedict Catholic Secondary School is a Catholic high school in Cambridge, Ontario, Canada. Opened in the fall of 1997, St. Benedict CSS has approximately 1800 students (as of 2018), from grades 9 to 12, and is part of the Waterloo Catholic District School Board. It is informally referred to as the "Home of the Saints". The school motto, "A Celebration of People" signifies the school as a welcoming, inclusive community.

The school was originally founded and opened in 1962, located on Northview Heights Drive in Cambridge, Ontario, and operated from the 1962-63 school year until the 1996-97 school year when it was closed and moved to the current three-story building. The original school structure was demolished in 2000. The current school building was planned in 1995 and constructed from 1996-1997 and was opened in September 1997 for the 1997-98 school year, though the ongoing 1997 teacher's strike delayed the opening by a few days.

The original 1997 part of the school is three stories, consisting of a library, wood shop and auto shop, cooking classrooms, three gymnasiums, a lecture hall, and many different subject classrooms. There are also nine portable classrooms around the campus, as well as a full-size track-and-field track out front. The atrium features a large circular design with a full-glass ceiling and stainless-steel stair railings. In 2001, plans were put in place to construct an addition to the rear right side of the school, as well as a separate manufacturing shop building. In late 2002, the construction began and was completed in the fall of 2003 for the 2003-04 school year. The expansion consisted of three stories, with a cosmetology studio, a new teachers lounge, and more classrooms, as well as the manufacturing building with a large metal shop, and three more classrooms. Along with the expansion, several parts of the original school building were upgraded as well, such as the main office and the wood shop.

In 2016, the track and field area in the front was upgraded with a new remote-controlled scoreboard, public basketball court, public gazebo, and two small playgrounds. The most recent renovations came in the summer of 2018 when the entire library (referred to now as the "Learning Commons") was remodelled with a new public entrance, kids area, school access entrance, and quiet study zone.

St. Benedict offers a wide variety of academic, athletic and technical programs.

The school website offers a moist range of information, including school news and daily "Ranger" announcements. The school's electronic newsletter, the Bennie's Electronic News Network (BENN) was published bi-weekly on Wednesdays, but were cancelled on Wednesday, June 24, 2026, Volume 18, Issue 22. Parents and students can access homework and course information using D2L or OneNote.

The school has multiple extra-curricular activities, such as the RISK tournament (as an event by the Games Club), Chess team, Robotics Club, DECA, Science Team, Anime Club, Tech Crew, Computer programming contests (as part of Coding Club), etc. The student council (otherwise known as SAC) is a group of students with potential leadership skills looking to evolve the school community through various events like the Fall Fair, BBQ Fun Day and seasonal assemblies. The school helps out with a variety of charities throughout the year with Thursday mission collections dedicated to a different cause each week. The students also partake in the Cambridge Firemen Christmas Basket and Food Drives during the seasons of giving. During the Haiti crisis, over $10,000 was raised and last year, the school's first Relay for Life event raised over $42,000 for the Canadian Cancer Society.

St. Benedict has many student-run or student-founded clubs and organizations. Students are encouraged to get involved with the extra-curricular activities available at school, including the annual play, bi-annual musical, participation in the Sears Drama Festival (Dramafest), the multiple clubs for miscellaneous subjects, and its many sports teams. Such sports teams include soccer, football, swimming, cricket, etc. Certain teachers are known for their participation in clubs and the formation of, Paul Riso and Andrew Renner in particular run or help many students set up clubs or other extra-curricular activities.

St. Benedict has a close relationship with a brother school in Japan where Japanese students come to visit the school for a week in Canada approximately every two years to experience the different lifestyles and cultures. An annual Colombian exchange program has formed in recent years along much of the same principles.

== Staff and administration ==
The school’s principal is Luisa Vona. The vice principals are Matthew Anderton, Leisha Craftchick, and Tom Mandich.

== Notable alumni ==
- C. Ernst Harth - Character actor known for such films as Smokin' Aces 2: Assassins' Ball, Scooby-Doo 2: Monsters Unleashed and Thir13en Ghosts.
- Ashley Newbrough - Actress from such shows as Privileged and Radio Free Roscoe
- Alexandra Chaves - Actress and dancer from The Next Step

== See also ==
- Education in Ontario
- List of secondary schools in Ontario
