= Shane Harte =

Canadian actor

- Born: November 28, 1996 (age 28); Brampton, Ontario, Canada
- Education: St. Roch Catholic Secondary School
- Occupations: Actor; singer
- Years active: 2013–present

Shane Harte (also known as Scamp Scally Wag) is a Canadian actor and singer. He is known for his role as Luke, in the Family series Lost & Found Music Studios. He also appeared as Luke in The Next Step.

In 2013, Harte was a member of hip hop artist Classified's "Inner Ninja" children's choir, appearing on the MuchMusic Video Awards and on MuchMusic's New Music Live. In 2015, he released two singles called "Let You Know" and "Left Standing". He is also a part of the soundtrack from Lost & Found Music Studios.

== Filmography ==
Year	Title	Role	Notes
2015	The Next Step	Luke	Recurring role; 9 episodes
2015	Good Witch	Anthony	Recurring role; 7 episodes
2016–2017	Lost & Found Music Studios	Luke	Main role
2016	Ice Girls	Darcy	Television film
