= Tiny Pretty Things =

American drama television series

- Genre: Drama
- Created by: Michael MacLennan
- Based on: Tiny Pretty Things by Sona Charaipotra & Dhonielle Clayton
- Starring: Brennan Clost; Barton Cowperthwaite; Bayardo De Murguia; Damon J. Gillespie; Kylie Jefferson; Casimere Jollette; Anna Maiche; Daniela Norman; Michael Hsu Rosen; Tory Trowbridge; Jess Salgueiro; Lauren Holly
- Music by: James Jandrisch
- Country of origin: United States
- Original language: English
- No. of seasons: 1
- No. of episodes: 10

Production
- Executive producers: Michael MacLennan; Jordanna Fraiberg; Gabrielle Neimand; Kiliaen Van Rensselaer; Deborah Henderson; Carrie Mudd
- Producer: Mary Anne Waterhouse
- Production locations: Toronto, Ontario, Canada
- Cinematography: Luc Montpellier
- Editors: Ben Wilkinson; Duncan Christie; Lisa Grootenboer
- Running time: 54–58 minutes
- Production companies: Peacock Alley Entertainment, Inc.; Action Man Entertainment; Insurrection Media

Original release
- Network: Netflix
- Release: December 14, 2020

Tiny Pretty Things is an American drama television series based on the novel of the same name by Sona Charaipotra and Dhonielle Clayton, created by Michael MacLennan. It premiered on Netflix on December 14, 2020, and aired for one season.

The series revolves around the goings on at a ballet school in Chicago, and focuses on the school's students, instructors, administrators, and benefactors. The dancing in the show is performed by the actors themselves, not doubles.

Critical reaction to the series has been mixed. According to the actor Brennan Clost, the show was quietly cancelled by Netflix after failing to garner sufficient views in its first season.

== Cast and characters ==
=== Main ===
- Brennan Clost as Shane McRae, an openly gay dancer who is secretly sleeping with his roommate, Oren
- Barton Cowperthwaite as Oren Lennox, a bisexual dancer who has an eating disorder and Shane's roommate whom he is secretly sleeping with
- Bayardo De Murguia as Ramon Costa, one of the best choreographers in the world
- Damon J. Gillespie as Caleb Wick, a dancer who is secretly sleeping with Monique, the Archer School of Ballet's director
- Kylie Jefferson as Neveah Stroyer, a dancer from Inglewood, California, who is given a full scholarship at the Archer School of Ballet after a student falls from a rooftop and into a coma
- Casimere Jollette as Bette Whitlaw, a dancer who is living in the shadow of her older sister, Delia, and Oren's girlfriend
- Anna Maiche as Cassie Shore, the star dancer who falls from the rooftop and is in a coma
- Daniela Norman as June Park, a dancer from England who is Cassie's former roommate and Neveah's roommate
- Michael Hsu Rosen as Nabil Limyadi a French dancer who is Arabic, Caleb's roommate, and Cassie's boyfriend
- Tory Trowbridge as Delia Whitlaw, Bette's older sister and a graduate of the Archer School of Ballet; she is living with Costa and is considered a rising star
- Jess Salgueiro as Isabel Cruz, a widowed Chicago Police Department police officer who is investigating Cassie's case, a case that triggered the memory of how her wife died
- Lauren Holly as Monique DuBois, the director of the Archer School of Ballet in Chicago, Illinois, who is secretly sleeping with Caleb, while exploiting her female students to some wealthy donors

=== Recurring ===
- Alexandra Bokyun Chun as Maricel Park, June's mother
- Shaun Benson as Topher Brooks, the ballet master at the Archer School of Ballet, Alan's Husband and Ramon's ex-lover
- Michelle Nolden as Katrina Whitlaw, Bette and Delia's mother who is part of the Archer School of Ballet's executive committee
- Paula Boudreau as Selena Covey, Monique's secretary
- Jessica Greco as Torri Fuller, the Archer School of Ballet's resident advisor
- Morgan Kelly as Alan Renfrew, the head of sports medicine at the Archer School of Ballet and Topher's husband
- Clare Butler as Esmé Halterlein, a student and dancer at the Archer School of Ballet
- Araya Mengesha as Tyler Stroyer, Neveah's older brother
- Ashley Coulson as Gwen Resnik
- Nicole Huff as Paige Aquino
- Alex Eling as Matteo Marchetti, Bette's love interest
- Daniel Kash as Sgt. Dan Lavery, Isabel's boss at Chicago Police Department
- Luke Humphrey as Travis Quinn
- Josh Pyman as Dev Ranaweera, Shane's love interest
- Erin Pitt as Laura

=== Guest ===
- Karen Robinson as Makayla Stroyer, Neveah's mother who has served time in prison for murder and is looking to make amends.
- Tiler Peck as Sienna Milken, a pop singer and former ballet student seeking to recruit dancers for an upcoming music video
- Emily Skubic as Lindy (uncredited)

== Episodes ==
No.	Title	Directed by	Teleplay by	Original release date
1	"Corps"	Gary Fleder; Samir Rehem	Michael MacLennan	December 14, 2020
After Cassie is pushed from the rooftop of a building by a hooded attacker, a place at the Archer School of Ballet in Chicago, Illinois becomes available, which is given to Neveah. She is allocated a dorm with roommate June, who is close friends with Bette, who sees Neveah as competition. Neveah befriends Shane, who suspects that Nabil, who was in a relationship with Cassie, pushed her from the rooftop. After a party, Shane and Oren have sex, and they both affirm it does not mean anything. However, Shane later looks longingly at a gay couple. June is questioned by Isabel, a police officer, about Cassie. She tells Isabel that every dancer but she was attending a party on the roof. Monique, the head of the school, hires Ramon to put on a production, and he schedules auditions for a production of Jack the Ripper. June visits Cassie in the hospital who is in a coma. Neveah receives a white rose with a message from an anonymous sender after putting pictures up on her wall.
2	"Range of Motion"	Samir Rehem; Gary Fleder	Michael MacLennan	December 14, 2020
The white rose that Neveah received causes June to panic, since there was a white rose on the street where Cassie bled out. Caleb gets mad at Nabil for praying in their room, stating their room is not a mosque. Caleb later states that Nabil is his enemy due to being Muslim since his father was killed in a war. When Shane goes to see Oren, Oren tells him that they can no longer do hookups since he can see it is affecting Shane, but Shane does not listen and makes him have sex with him. Neveah visits Cassie, who is still in a coma. After Bette injures her foot and heel cord, she takes medication from her mother, but the head of sports medicine notices her injury during her audition and states that he may sign her off. June's mother packs up her belongings to take her home after she does not get a main role in the production.
3	"Class Act"	Joanna Kerns	David Rambo	December 14, 2020
Isabel informs Neveah that due to reports of bad behavior at his former school in Paris, she suspects that Nabil may be targeting her. When Nabil is behind her as she nearly gets hit by a truck, she suspects he pushed her and informs Isabel. However, Neveah later apologizes to Nabil for suspecting him, and the pair kiss. June pleads with her mother to allow her to stay at the Archer School, and when she tries to take her to New York, June informs her that she will be applying for emancipation. Oren discovers the bad state of Bette's foot, and gives her the ultimatum of dropping out of the production or reporting her to the teachers.
4	"Dance Dance Revolution"	Joanna Kerns	Aiyana White	December 14, 2020
Ramon's Ripper dance is misogynistic and Neveah tries to organize the other dancers to push back against his predatory behavior. However, the school does not support her push for justice. Neveah and Bette put the pieces together that Ramon slept with Cassie in Paris when Bette shows half of the picture of Ramon to Neveah. Bette sides with Neveah to stand up to Ramon, but along the way she begins to suspect that Oren may not have been faithful to her.
5	"Split Sole"	Samir Rehem	Azia Squire	December 14, 2020
Neveah visits her mother in jail and learns she is up for parole. Neveah must decide whether or not to support her mom in court. June is on her own and must raise money for her school. She gets a job working at a high end, a private club known as Michi Beach Club and meets a wealthy man named Travis who may help her. Bette is desperate to get a solo in Ramon's new ballet and tries to seduce him. The ballet students discover that June had a stash of roofies and dosed Cassie the night she fell.
6	"Joie de Vivre"	Samir Rehem	Stuti Malhotra	December 14, 2020
The students are auditioning for a music video choreographed by a famous ballet dancer. Everyone wants a part, especially Caleb, who hopes his liaison with Monique might give him the edge. In the end, the role goes to Nabil. But, dancing with feeling proves difficult for him because of his bottled up emotions over Cassie. Bette seeks out a relationship outside of her dance school, with serious implications for her relationship with Oren. Shane meets a stranger from an app in person, but this suitor proves to be closer to the school than he knew. Meanwhile, June realizes the lucrative work at the club comes with strings attached and suffers the consequence of refusing to go along with the powerful men there. She is unaware how deep this conspiracy goes, however. Nevaeh and her mother say goodbye for now, while Officer Isabel gets closer to the truth.
7	"Catch & Release"	April Mullen	Michael MacLennan	December 14, 2020
Isabel talks to the students trying to close the holes in their story about the night Cassie fell. Oren worries about his weight while dealing with the fallout from his breakup with Bette. Shane takes new steps in a relationship but feels inadequate. Nabil thinks Cassie is getting better, despite the doctor's proclamation that her condition is worsening. He also must make a big decision about his future at the school. Delia confronts Ramon about his predatory behavior and what happened in Paris. Ramon seeks comfort in an old flame and discovers who has been blackmailing him. Another dancer, Paige suffers the consequences of working at Michi Beach and Neveah helps her. The dancers try to infiltrate the underage sex trafficking ring at the club and discover that Monique is in charge of the exploitative operation. But, Bette's painkiller addiction catches up with her when she gets in a car accident with Neveah and June in the car. Delia shows up with Oren to pee in a cup for her sister in order for Bette to pass the sobriety test.
8	"Relevé"	April Mullen	David Rambo & Aiyana White	December 14, 2020
The doctors say Cassie will not regain consciousness and her parents come to take her off life support against Nabil's fervent wishes. Nabil and Caleb grow closer despite their differences. Isabel gets new leads about the case. The dancers compete for a position in the school's promotional photoshoot. In the fallout of their takedown at the club, Bette's injury is discovered and she is removed from the showcase. But, she is not out of the game yet. Neveah tries to get the press interested in the conspiracy between the club and the school, and the exploitation of the dancers. But, she might be in over her head. Meanwhile, her relationship with Oren develops. June is threatened by the predator at the club. She also discovers exactly who sabotaged her solo. The dancers come together to say goodbye to Cassie, but her fight isn't over yet. Bette starts to piece together her memories of the night Cassie fell.
9	"It's Not the Waking, It's the Rising"	Gary Harvey	Stuti Malhotra & Azia Squire	December 14, 2020
The article about the school selling access to dancers through the club comes out, tarnishing the reputation of the company and diminishing sales. Drama in the administration abounds. Meanwhile, Cassie regains enough consciousness to say her fall was no accident. Ramon pays her a visit in the hospital, causing conflict in her relationship with Nabil. Bette is done with her rehab and can dance again. June's mother comes to watch her in the principal role, but Bette's return threatens June's position. The students try to find a way to draw attention to the Archer School and bring in money. Even though Neveah wants to move forward with her relationship with Oren, she is reluctant to go public and dance with him in the promo video. Monique has to reckon with her actions and the future of the Archer school. Isabel closes in on a suspect in the company and makes an arrest the night of the Ripper premiere.
10	"Push Comes to Shove"	Gary Harvey	Michael MacLennan	December 14, 2020
With Bette in custody, June dances the solo in Ripper to acclaim. There is talk of an touring production of Ripper and everyone wants a piece of the action. Nabil confesses his feelings for June, but she is torn between her feelings and her ambition. Monique claims credit for the dancers' success, tries to tie up loose ends and sets Nevaeh up for a fall. Neveah is not down and out yet as she makes a deal with an unexpected ally, Cassie. But, she may have to make a choice between Oren and her future as a dancer. June realizes who she saw the night Cassie fell and the dancers put the pieces together that Delia is the one who pushed Cassie. Bette later finds out that her mother knew that Delia pushed Cassie and her mother is willing to let Bette take the fall for Delia because she is a minor. Cassie returns to the school just in time for a new shocking crime, Ramon has been stabbed.

== Production ==
=== Development ===
Insurrection Media, Inc. optioned the source material from HarperCollins and developed the project for a year before getting a series order on August 6, 2019, from Netflix for 10 episodes. The series is created by Michael MacLennan who executive produced alongside Kiliaen Van Rensselaer, Jordanna Fraiberg, Deborah Henderson, Gary Fleder, Gabrielle Neimand, and Carrie Mudd. Fleder also directed the first episode of the series. Production companies involved with the series were slated to consist of Insurrection Media and Peacock Alley Entertainment, Inc. The series premiered on December 14, 2020.

=== Casting ===
Upon the series order announcement, Lauren Holly, Kylie Jefferson, Casimere Jollette, Daniela Norman, Brennan Clost, Michael Hsu Rosen, Damon J. Gillespie, Bayardo De Murguia, Barton Cowperthwaite, Tory Trowbridge, and Jess Salgueiro were cast as series regulars. On September 20, 2019, Anna Maiche joined the main cast. On December 9, 2020, it was reported a professional ballet dancer, Emily Skubic is set to make her debut guest role in the series.

=== Filming ===
Principal photography for the series began on August 6, 2019, and ended on December 3, 2019, in Toronto, Canada.

== Reception ==
On review aggregator Rotten Tomatoes, Tiny Pretty Things received an approval rating of 53% based on 19 critic reviews, with an average rating of 5.38/10. The website's critics consensus reads, "Tiny Pretty Things has some solid moves, but an over-reliance on empty scandal over emotional substance make for unsatisfying viewing." Metacritic gave the series a weighted average score of 47 out of 100 based on 6 critic reviews, indicating "mixed or average reviews".
