= Loathe Thy Neighbor =

2025 film by Sergio Navarretta

- Release poster
- Directed by: Sergio Navarretta
- Written by: Christian Majewski
- Produced by: Brennan Clost; Lauren Holly; Christian Majewski; Rebeka Herron; Danny Roth
- Starring: Lauren Holly; Brennan Clost; Shaun Benson; Brittany Raymond
- Cinematography: Mathieu Taillefer
- Edited by: Alex Gans
- Production companies: Taconic Pictures, New Mountain Films
- Release date: August 29, 2025
- Running time: 105 minutes
- Country: Canada
- Language: English

Loathe Thy Neighbor is a 2025 Canadian comedy drama film directed by Sergio Navarretta from a screenplay written by Christian Majewski. The film stars Lauren Holly and Brennan Clost. The story focuses on a young man who inherits a farm, and runs into conflict with his neighbor.

Filming took place on a farm in Arran-Elderslie, Bruce County in 2023.

According to interviews with Clost and Holly, the film was conceived, written, cast, and shot in just seven weeks - a turnaround almost unheard of in the industry, where projects typically undergo months or even years of development before casting or production.

Loathe Thy Neighbor had an advance screening on August 25 in Owen Sound, and then received a full release on August 29, 2025.

== Plot ==
The story follows Will Larkfield, a marketing executive with severe allergies who inherits his late father’s farmhouse in the rural community of Burns Valley. Bound by conditions in the will, Will relocates to the property and quickly comes into conflict with his neighbor, Wanda Bellerose, a struggling beekeeper who is resentful of newcomers. Wanda undertakes a series of disruptive actions aimed at making Will’s adjustment to rural life difficult.

Adding to the tension is Wanda’s daughter, Valerie, who lives out of a truck on the farm. Though she initially appears supportive of Will, her behavior creates further complications. As disputes escalate through acts of retaliation and manipulation, both Will and Wanda struggle to maintain control over their homes and livelihoods. The conflict eventually forces them to confront questions of family, community, and belonging.

== Cast ==
- Lauren Holly as Wanda Bellerose
- Brennan Clost as Will Larkfield
- Shaun Benson as Joe Dickinson
- Brittany Raymond as Valerie Bellerose, Wanda's daughter
- Paloma Nuñez as Officer Ruth Norwood
- Jessica Greco as Daphne Moran
- Luke Humphrey as Vince Asshole
- Patrice Goodman as Nancy Whittle
- David Eisner as Dr. Nelson
- Ali Hassan as the Pharmacist

== Release ==
The film was originally titled "Yuppie" when it received an "Industry Selects" screening at the Toronto International Film Festival in 2024. It was released under the new title Loathe Thy Neighbor in Canadian cinemas on August 29, 2025.

== Reception ==
Richard Crouse gave the film 3.5 stars, stating "A dark riff on “Green Acres,” “Loathe Thy Neighbor” is more than the standard fish-out-of-water story. What begins as a “citidiot” in the country tale, slowly reveals itself to be a lesson in community and personal growth."

Anne Brodie of What She Said had positive reviews, stating "Ok so we have all had bad neighbours. That uncomfortable truth drives Lauren Holly's darkly funny, sarcastic, absurd comedy. ... amusingly "out there" and worth a look"

Volkmar Richter of National Observer gave the film 3/5, stating "Ever thought of moving to the country, a small town maybe, where life is quieter and people know each other? Here’s a counterview. You might find yourself not fitting in, clashing with the locals, disrupting them just by being different. That’s demonstrated effectively in this film made in Bruce County, Ontario...You can see how this is all tangling up. It’s funny and exaggerated and quite possible. Sergio Navarretta directed but Lauren Holly, who lives in Toronto, seems to have been a creative-force. She not only starred but co-produced (in two capacities), worked on casting, wardrobe, ADR, accounting, hair and makeup and even animal wrangling. Good stuff."

Nick Bythrow of Screenrant had mixed reviews, stating "Loathe Thy Neighbor tells the story of two dysfunctional neighbors in a rural town, striking a hasty yet careful balance between heartache and heart."

Chris Knight of Original Cin wasn't as enthusiastic, grading it a C+ and stating, "I wanted to find more to enjoy in Loathe They Neighbor — which until recently appeared on the IMDb website under the title Yuppie — but there isn’t much to love. Sergio Navarretta’s direction is solid, as are the performances, but nothing elevates the story."
