= Colborne Street =

Colborne Street may refer to:

- Colborne Street, Toronto
- To a street in Montreal which was formerly called Colborne Street.
