= Milburn building =

Building in Toronto, Ontario, Canada

Coordinates: 43.6489°N 79.3749°W

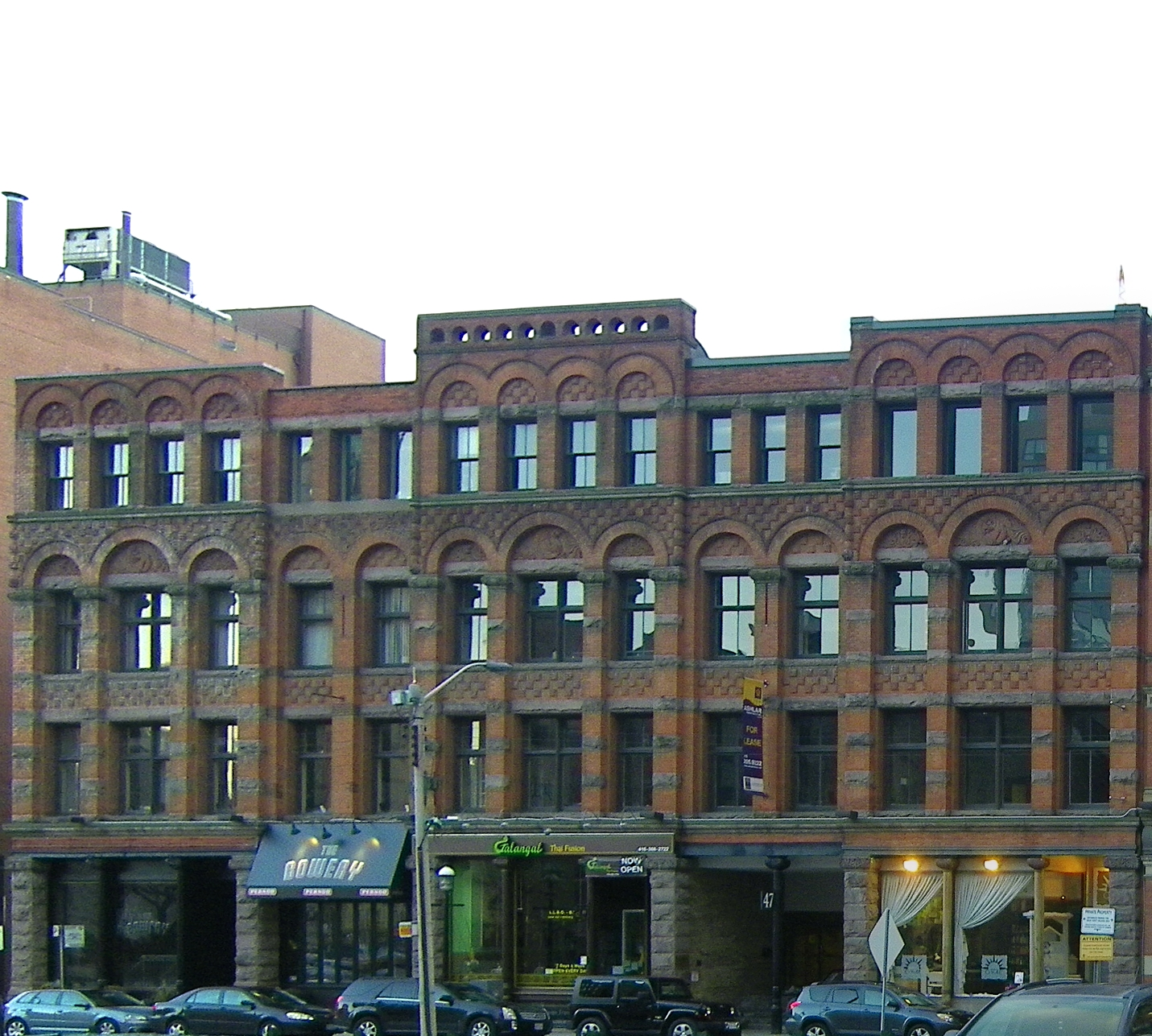
The Milburn building, 47-55 Colborne Street, Toronto, built in 1886 by E.J. Lennox.jpg

The Milburn building was built in 1886 at 47–55 Colborne Street, in Toronto, Ontario, Canada, by architect Edward James Lennox. Lennox was well known for his work on more famous buildings in Toronto, like Casa Loma and Toronto's old city hall.

The Milburn building was originally constructed to serve as a warehouse for Thomas Milburn, a wholesaler of patent medicines. The block on the south side of Colborne Street between Church Street and Leader Lane remains in use, and the storefronts house restaurants.

Marilyn M. Litvak, in Edward James Lennox: Builder of Toronto, described the building as "Romanesque Revival".
