= D2L =

Global software company

Desire2Learn [D2L]
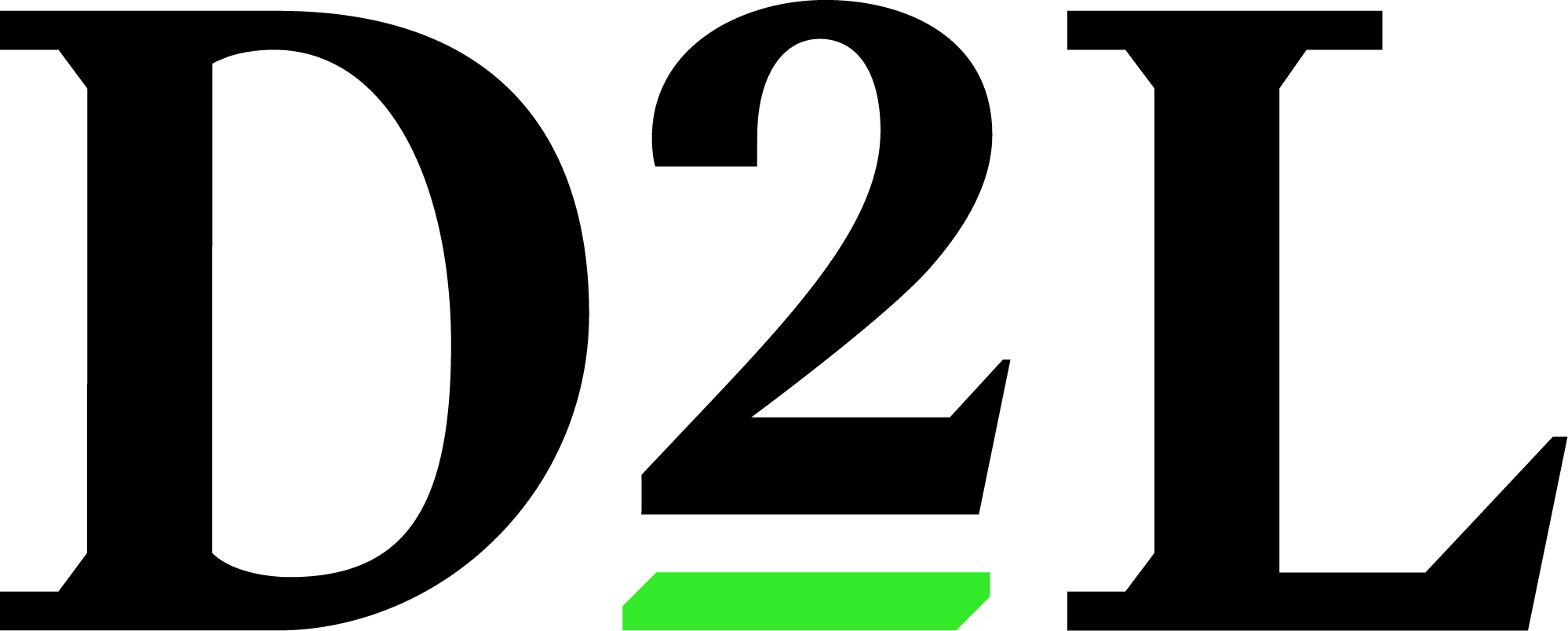
- Type: Public
- Traded as: TSX: DTOL
- Industry: Educational Technology; Learning Management Systems; Content Authoring Systems; Educational Cloud Software
- Founded: 1999
- Founder: John Baker
- Headquarters: Kitchener, Ontario, Canada
- Area served: Worldwide
- Key people: John Baker (CEO); Anna Forgione (Chief Legal Officer); Josh Huff (CFO); Lee Poteck (CRO); Brian Finnerty (CMO)
- Products: Brightspace, Creator+, Performance+, D2L Lumi, Achievement+, Course Merchant, Services, Cloud, Support
- Brands: Brightspace, Open Courses
- Number of employees: 1,200+ (2024)
- Website: www.d2l.com

D2L (or Desire2Learn) is a Canada-based global software company with offices in Australia, Brazil, Europe, India, Singapore, and the United States.

D2L is the developer of the Brightspace learning management system, a cloud-based software suite used by schools, higher educational institutions, and businesses for online and blended classroom learning. The company is also the developer of Open Courses, a Massive Open Online Course platform.

== History ==
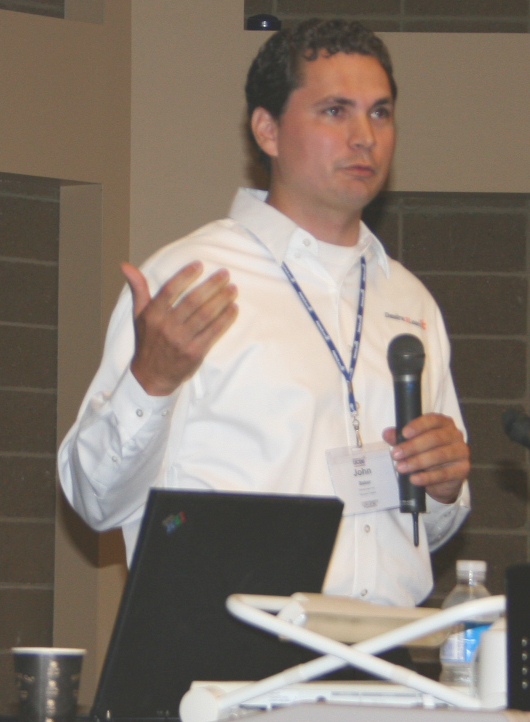
John Baker, president and CEO of Desire2Learn speaking at the University of Guelph

D2L was founded in 1999 by Canadian John Baker, who became president and CEO. He founded D2L while studying systems design engineering during his third year at the University of Waterloo. He was awarded the Meritorious Service Cross in 2017, for his work at the company to advance learning across the country and around the world. D2L raised $80 million in Series A funding, one of the largest tech funding rounds in Canada at the time, to expand its product offerings and grow internationally. The company went public with an initial public offering in November 2021, on the Toronto Stock Exchange. D2L named Stephen Laster as D2L, President in 2022. D2L acquired Connected Shopping Ltd., makers of Course Merchant in 2023.

== Developments ==
In 2004, D2L first introduced support for Competency Based Education, and launched an integrated ePortfolio product to allow learners to document their own learning. The company became the recipient of the 2012 Platinum Learning Impact Award in the event hosted by IMS Global. In 2013, D2L was recognized by the National Federation of the Blind for its leadership in Accessibility with the Dr. Jacob Bolotin Award. Three years later, the company partnered with the National Federation of the Blind's Strategic Nonvisual Access Partner program to ensure learning systems are fully accessible. That same year, D2L launched a beta of a redesigned interface using responsive web design to offer full functionality on mobile devices, which saw general release in 2017. In July 2024, announced the acquisition of H5P Group, a developer of content creation tools to enable educators develop interactive content.

== Products and services ==
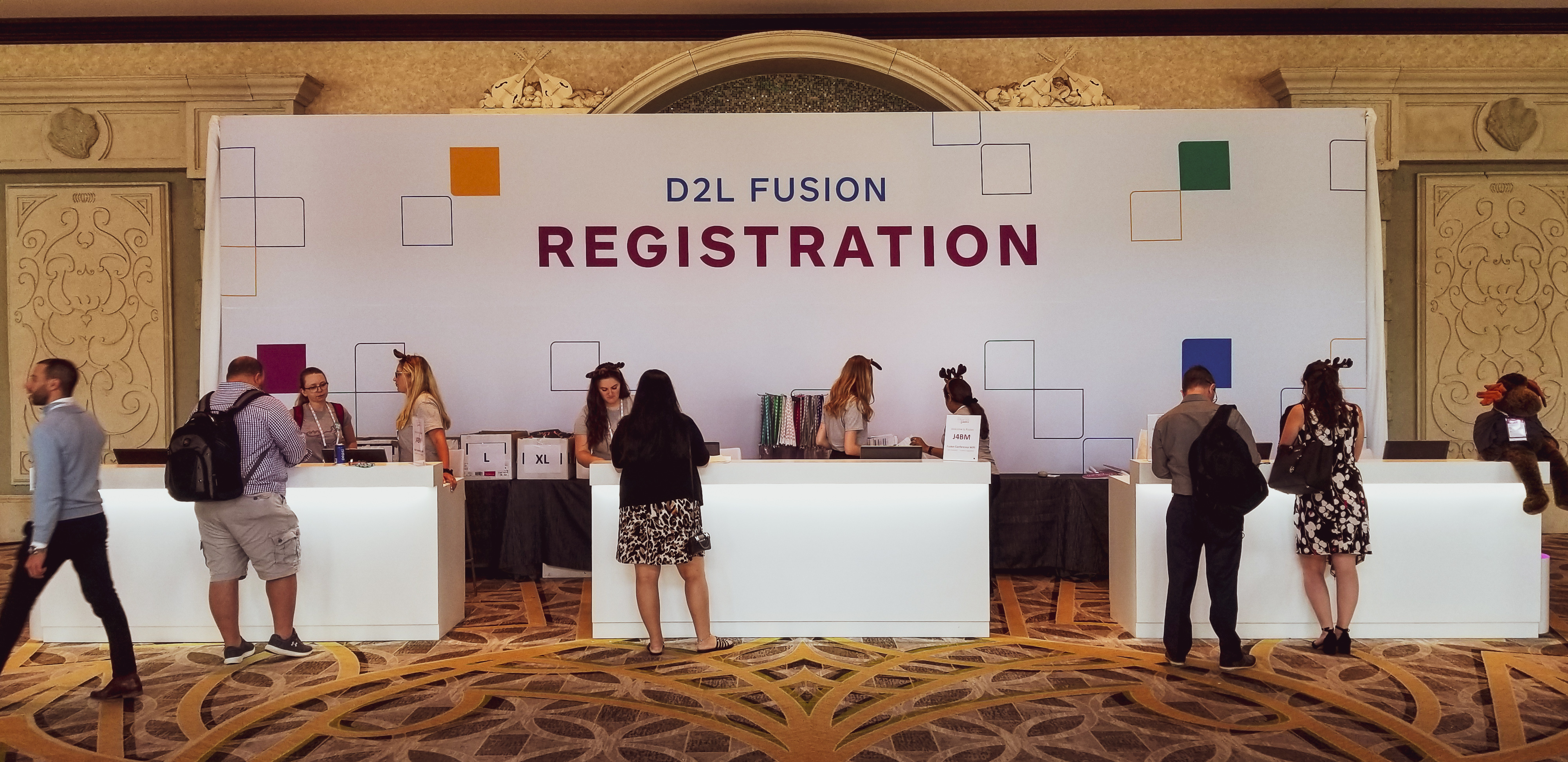
D2L Fusion convention in Kissimmee, Florida, 2019

=== Brightspace ===
Brightspace is a cloud-based learning management system (LMS) developed by D2L for use in K-12, higher education, and corporate training environments. Brightspace is a platform for creating, delivering, and managing online and blended learning experiences. Brightspace allows for customization, integrates with third-party tools, and provides mobile and accessibility support.

D2L's first virtual learning environment clients included University of Guelph, Virtual High School (Ontario), the University of Waterloo and Fanshawe College.

Brightspace was built using microservices and operates as a software as a service. It incorporates Web Components and Google Polymer, HTML5, and responsive web design to provide a user interface that can work on any mobile device.

Brightspace combines a Learning Environment, ePortfolio, Learning Repository, Video Recorder, Virtual Classroom, and Mobile apps, in one cloud-based platform.

In May 2020, Brightspace signed an agreement with Stockholm-based edtech company RepresentEdTech to resell and distribute its cloud-based learning platform in the Nordic region.

=== Creator+ ===
D2L Brightspace Creator+ is a bundle within the Brightspace learning management system (LMS) developed by D2L (Desire2Learn). It is designed for educators and content creators to develop interactive and accessible learning materials. Creator+ has features like multimedia content creation, customizable templates, interactive elements such as practice questions, and accessibility checks.

=== Performance+ ===
Performance+ is a bundle learning analytics to help automate tasks and identify risks. An adaptive learning engine personalizes the content for each learner. Learning Analytics and Intelligent Agents provide early intervention to help learners and a set of data that can be used to make improvements based upon analysis.

In 2016, Fast Company recognized D2L as a leader in Data Science.

=== D2L Achievement+ for Brightspace ===
An add-on package designed for schools, institutions, and organizations offering competency-based education programs. It includes an interface for aligning course activities and assessments with learning outcomes, as well as a data dashboard for reporting.

=== D2L Lumi ===
In 2024, D2L launched D2L Lumi, a set of artificial intelligence-powered features to support building content, assessments, and activities.

=== Open Courses ===
In 2008, D2L entered the massive open online course (MOOC) market to support MOOC pioneers Stephen Downes and George Siemens.

The University of Tasmania used D2L's MOOC platform for tens of thousands of learners, with more than 70% of students completing the courses.

=== Course Merchant ===
Course Merchant is a software as a service e-commerce and course catalog enables institutions and organizations to sell and manage access to online courses and other educational content.

=== Services ===
D2L's services include onboarding services, end-user help desk support, technical account management, technical data management, advisory consulting, program management, training, course development, customization, and accessibility design support.
