= Brittany Raymond =

Canadian actress and dancer (born 1995)

- Born: February 24, 1995 (age 31); Brampton, Ontario, Canada
- Occupations: Actress; dancer
- Years active: 2013–present
- Television: The Next Step; Dare Me

Brittany Lynn Raymond (born February 24, 1995) is a Canadian actress and dancer. She is best known for her role as Riley in the Family Channel series The Next Step and Cori Ross in the USA Network series, Dare Me.

== Career ==
From 2013 to 2017, she starred in the Family Channel series The Next Step, portraying the role of Riley. As part of promotion for the series, she has performed in Canada, the United Kingdom, Australia, and New Zealand. From 2015 to 2016, she portrayed Riley in the spinoff series, Lost & Found Music Studios. In 2019 and 2025, she reprised her role of Riley for The Next Step Christmas Special, airing on CBC Gem and in the series finale in season 10. She began appearing in the USA Network series Dare Me as Cori Ross.

Aside from being a dancer, she also writes often and helped co-write the scripts for two web-series she was in: Australianaire$ and Graped. She starred in each of these alongside friend and business partner whom she started the production company "Knuckles on Four" with, Brennan Clost. The two have produced a six-episode mini web-series, Australianaire$ in 2020 as well as a short film, Almost Twenty, in 2021.

In 2016, she started the YouTube channel, "Jo and Britt" with high school friend Joelle Farrow, whom she met in Grade 12 Writer's Craft Class, bonding over Shaquan Lewis. The two did promotional events and had sponsorships with Google through their Pixel Phone. They also went to the UK for meet and greets to interact more with fans. In the time that Jo and Britt was running, they created merch, (clothing, notebooks, and phone cases) on their Threadless website.

== Personal life ==
Raymond was born on February 24, 1995, in Brampton, Ontario, to parents, Paula and John Raymond, alongside older sister Samantha. Her mother is of Portuguese descent. She danced at Joanne Chapman School of Dance, where she mastered her art. She moved to Georgetown, Ontario, when she booked The Next Step at age 17 after dancing competitively since the age of six.

At the end of 2016, she was diagnosed with Crohn's disease, where she had to have a surgery to remove part of her intestine. Currently, she is in remission. During that time, she took up knitting and writing more. She has been dating Benjamin Dunlop, a photographer from Brisbane, Australia since they met at the 5th Canadian Screen Awards in 2017, when she won the Best Performance in a Children's or Youth Program or Series award for her role as Riley in The Next Step. The two live in an apartment overlooking Downtown Toronto with their cat Sauble.

== Filmography ==
=== Film ===
Year	Title	Role	Notes
2015	The Next Step Live: The Movie	Self	Documentary film
2016	Transitions	Savannah	Short film
2018	Extracurricular	Miriam Randall	Film
2019	Waiting	Lynn	Short, self written film
2021	Almost Twenty	Unnamed	Co-written short film
2024	Sway	Jade	

=== Television ===
Year	Title	Role	Notes
2013–2017, 2019, 2025	The Next Step	Riley	Main role; 135 episodes
2015–2016	Lost & Found Music Studios	Riley	Recurring role
2016	Graped	Cindy	Unsold TV pilot
2016	Taking the Next Step	Herself/Judge	Reality dance competition show (judge); recurring
2019–2020	Dare Me	Cori Ross	Recurring role
2021	Chateau Laurier	Unnamed	Guest appearance
2021	The Hardy Boys	Lola Burton	4 episodes
2023	Fellow Travelers	Kimberly Fuller	3 episodes

=== Web ===
Year	Title	Role	Notes
2020	Australianaire$	Cleo, Beth, various extras	Self produced web series during COVID-19 pandemic

== Awards and nominations ==
Awards	Year	Category	Work	Result	Ref.
Canadian Screen Award	2015	Best Performance in a Children's or Youth Program or Series	The Next Step	Nominated	
Canadian Screen Award	2017	Best Performance in a Children's or Youth Program or Series	The Next Step	Won	
