= Keara Graves =

Canadian YouTuber (born 1999)

- Born: Keara Kristen Graves; 26 April 1999 (age 27); Sault Ste. Marie, Ontario, Canada
- Years active: 2005, 2015–present
- Spouse: Lauren Rice (m. 2020)
- Parent: Steve Graves (father)

YouTube information
- Channel: Keara Graves
- Subscribers: 542 thousand
- Views: 96.17 million
- Last updated: 29 March 2026

Keara Kristen Graves (born 26 April 1999) is a Canadian actor, YouTuber, and singer. They gained prominence through their role on the Family Channel series Lost & Found Music Studios (2015–2017).

== Early life ==
Graves was born in Sault Ste. Marie to Kathryn Greco and former NHL player Steve Graves. They have an older sister, Alexandra "Alexa". They are of Italian descent on their mother's side and Irish descent on their father's. The family moved to Whitby when Keara was 4.

Graves attended Leo J. Austin Catholic Secondary School before moving to Toronto in 2017. They enrolled in the Success Breakthrough Workshop.

== Career ==
Graves made their television debut as a child in two 2005 episodes of the CBC series The Doodlebops. They returned to television ten years later when they joined the main cast of the Family Channel musical series Lost & Found Music Studios as singer-songwriter Leia, a role Graves would play from 2015 to 2017. Graves began uploading song covers to their YouTube channel in 2015, following by vlog, lifestyle, and beauty content in 2016. She received attention in 2019 for their queer versions of songs as well as their short film Night Drive.

In 2020, Graves played Rebecca Bailey in the CTV crime drama Cardinal, Max in the Crave series The D Cut, Grace in the Netflix teen drama Grand Army, and Hanna opposite Sydney Meyer in the Lifetime television film Pretty Cheaters, Deadly Lies. In 2023, Graves had a recurring role as Miss Addison in the Showtime limited series Fellow Travelers.

== Personal life ==
Graves is queer, genderfluid, and uses they/she pronouns. Graves is married to Lauren Rice.

== Filmography ==
=== Film ===
Year	Title	Role	Notes
2019	Night Drive	Maia	Short YouTube film; wrote, directed
2019	Weenie	Stevie	Short film
2021	Violet Skies	Adrian	Short film
2024	We Forgot to Break Up	Billie	
TBA	The Love at Cliff's Edge	Josephine	

=== Television ===
Year	Title	Role	Notes
2005	The Doodlebops	Kid	2 episodes
2015–2017	Lost & Found Music Studios	Leia	Main role
2017	Designated Survivor	Student #3	Episode: "Misalliance"
2019	Wayne	Popular Girl	Episode: "Chapter Five: Del"
2019	Deadly Influencer	Lenore Poe	Television film
2019	The Cheerleader Escort	Rachel Singer	Television film
2020	Spinning Out	Beautiful Girl	Episode: "Welcome to the Family"
2020	Cardinal	Rebecca Bailey	3 episodes
2020	The D Cut	Max	5 episodes
2020	Grand Army	Grace	5 episodes
2020	Pretty Cheaters, Deadly Lies	Hanna	Television film
2022	The Price Of Perfection	Ava	Television film: 2022 The Handmaid's Tale Handmaid #3 Episode : "Security"
2023	Fellow Travelers	Miss Addison	4 episodes
