= Steve Graves =

Canadian ice hockey player

- Born: 7 April 1964 (age 62) Trenton, Ontario, Canada
- Height: 5 ft 10 in (178 cm)
- Weight: 175 lb (79 kg; 12 st 7 lb)
- Position: Left wing
- Shot: Left
- Played for: Rungsted; HC Asiago; HC Ajoie; TPS; Edmonton Oilers
- National team: Canada
- NHL draft: 41st overall, 1982; Edmonton Oilers
- Playing career: 1980–1993

Stephen Graves (born 7 April 1964) is a Canadian former professional ice hockey left wing. He played 35 games in the National Hockey League with the Edmonton Oilers between 1983 and 1988.

== Playing career ==
He began his junior career with the Ottawa Jr. Senators of the CCHL and Sault Ste. Marie Greyhounds of the OHL before being selected in the second round of the 1982 NHL entry draft, 41st overall, by the Edmonton Oilers. In 1984, he was named to the OHL Third All-Star Team and played his first two NHL games for the Oilers as a 19-year-old. Known for his exceptional skating abilities and speed he would play parts of two more seasons in the NHL, and spent the balance of his career in the minors or Europe. Graves played over 750 games as a Junior and Professional.

Graves was a standout with the Canadian National Team over a couple of seasons and led the team in scoring at the Izvestia Tournament in Moscow with 5 goals and 6 points after only 3 games while on loan from his Finnish Club Team, HC TPS. His other clubs included HC Ajoie, the New Haven Nighthawks, the Phoenix Roadrunners, and HC Asiago. Graves retired after the 1992–93 season, settling in Sault Ste. Marie to work in finance with Dundee Private Investors Inc.

== Personal life ==
Graves was born in Trenton, Ontario and grew up in Ottawa. He is of Irish descent. He has two kids, Alexandra "Alexa", and Keara Graves who is gender-fluid.

== Career statistics ==
=== Regular season and playoffs ===
			Regular season					Playoffs
Season	Team	League	GP	G	A	Pts	PIM	GP	G	A	Pts	PIM
1980–81	Ottawa Jr. Senators	CJHL	44	21	17	38	47	—	—	—	—	—
1981–82	Sault Ste. Marie Greyhounds	OHL	66	12	15	27	49	13	8	5	13	14
1982–83	Sault Ste. Marie Greyhounds	OHL	60	21	20	41	48	5	0	0	0	4
1983–84	Sault Ste. Marie Greyhounds	OHL	67	41	48	89	47	16	6	8	14	8
1983–84	Edmonton Oilers	NHL	2	0	0	0	0	—	—	—	—	—
1984–85	Nova Scotia Oilers	AHL	80	17	15	32	20	6	0	1	1	4
1985–86	Nova Scotia Oilers	AHL	78	19	18	37	22	—	—	—	—	—
1986–87	Edmonton Oilers	NHL	12	2	0	2	0	—	—	—	—	—
1986–87	Nova Scotia Oilers	AHL	59	18	10	28	22	5	1	1	2	2
1987–88	Edmonton Oilers	NHL	21	3	4	7	10	—	—	—	—	—
1987–88	Nova Scotia Oilers	AHL	11	6	2	8	4	—	—	—	—	—
1988–89	TPS	FIN	43	16	12	28	48	10	2	8	10	12
1988–89	Canadian National Team	Intl	3	5	1	6	2	—	—	—	—	—
1989–90	HC Ajoie	NLA	4	4	0	4	16	—	—	—	—	—
1989–90	Canadian National Team	Intl	53	24	19	43	50	—	—	—	—	—
1990–91	New Haven Nighthawks	AHL	3	0	1	1	2	—	—	—	—	—
1990–91	Phoenix Roadrunners	IHL	56	11	20	31	64	5	1	3	4	2
1991–92	HC Asiago	ITA	12	4	6	10	4	—	—	—	—	—
1991–92	HC Sierre	NLB	9	11	1	12	27	—	—	—	—	—
1991–92	Canadian National Team	Intl	34	13	11	24	36	—	—	—	—	—
1992–93	Rungsted	DEN	33	35	17	52	90	—	—	—	—	—
AHL totals			231	60	46	106	70	11	1	2	3	6
NHL totals			35	5	4	9	10	—	—	—	—	—
