= Lost & Found Music Studios =

Canadian musical television series (2015–2017)

- Genre: Teen drama; Docudrama; Musical
- Created by: Frank Van Keeken
- Starring: Shane Harte; Alex Zaichkowski; Keara Graves; Sarah Carmosino; Levi Randall; Deshaun Clarke; Ella Jonas Farlinger; Katrina Hachey; Trevor Tordjman
- Opening theme: "Lost and Found"
- Country of origin: Canada
- Original language: English
- No. of seasons: 2
- No. of episodes: 27

Production
- Executive producers: Frank van Keeken; Ivan Schneeberg; David Fortier
- Producers: Laura Harbin; Jay Prychidny; Laurie McLarty
- Camera setup: Multi-camera
- Running time: 23–24 minutes
- Production companies: Temple Street Productions; Beachwood Canyon Productions

Original release
- Network: Family Channel
- Release: December 11, 2015 – March 31, 2017

Related
- The Next Step

Lost & Found Music Studios is a Canadian musical-drama children's series created by Frank van Keeken and aired by Family Channel. The series is produced by Temple Street Productions and Beachwood Canyon Productions. It is a music-centered spinoff of the dance-focused The Next Step, using a similar mockumentary format and sharing characters and locations; the main characters of Lost & Found initially appeared in the third season of The Next Step. The series premiered on December 11, 2015, on Family Channel, running for two seasons of 27 episodes, and airing its final episode on March 31, 2017.

== Premise ==
"A live music venue, recording studio and jam space, Lost & Found is an amazing place where young musicians go to become great. Members immerse themselves in music, write songs record tracks and form bands in hopes of turning their passion into a profession. But, if making it in the music industry wasn’t hard enough, these aspiring artists also have to deal with the many issues teens face including first crushes, peer pressure, difficult home lives and trying to fit in."

== Cast and characters ==
=== Main ===
- Shane Harte as Luke, the lead singer and guitarist for the band Lost & Found, and a songwriter
- Alex Zaichkowski as John, the lead guitarist of Lost & Found, and a songwriter
- Keara Graves as Leia, an extroverted singer-songwriter who has been with the program for two years, she views herself as the best songwriter in the program
- Sarah Carmosino as Rachel, a singer and songwriter with self-confidence issues, and Leia's best friend
- Levi Randall as Theo, the quirky bassist of the Lost & Found band, and a songwriter
- Trevor Tordjman as James, a former dancer with The Next Step and the drummer for the Lost & Found band, though he is not in the music program
- Deshaun Clarke as Jude, a confident rapper
- Ella Jonas Farlinger as Eva, a shy singer and songwriter with strict parents
- Ali Milner as Parker, the studio manager at Lost & Found Music Studios
- Michael Torontow as Mr. T, a music producer and the owner of the Lost & Found Music Studios
- Rakim Kelly as Isaac, a young singer from a tough neighborhood
- Olivia Solo as Annabelle, a bespectacled singer-songwriter and vlogger who blows her first audition when she learns the wrong song
- Maranda Thomas as Mary, a singer-songwriter and keyboardist
- Alyssa Baker as Maggie, a musician and singer-songwriter from a small town
- Jeni Ross as Clara, a young singer who doubts her belonging in the music program
- Katrina Hachey as Hannah, a singer and guitarist
- Matthew Bacik as Nate, a young singer and keyboardist with an oppressive stage mother

=== Recurring ===
- Victoria Baldesarra as Michelle, a dancer at The Next Step
- Brittany Raymond as Riley, a dancer at The Next Step
- Jordan Clark as Giselle, a dancer at The Next Step and Clara's sister
- Kathryn Greco as Patricia, the manager of Java Junction
- Ian Matthews as Thomas, John's imposing widower father
- Lovell Adams-Gray as Tully, Isaac's problematic older brother and a popular DJ known as Paradox
- Bailey Pelkman as Britney, a singer who is auditioning for the second year in a row to get into the Lost & Found music program
- Lauren Thomas as Jackie, Mary's younger sister

=== Guest stars ===
- Tyler Shaw as himself (in "Dancing in the Rain")
- Brenda Bazinet as Ruth, John's grandmother (in "Callin' Callin' Part 2", "The Sound of Change")
- Kerri Smith as Connie, Eva's strict mother (in "Rhythm Is My Heartbeat", "Wondering", "You Could Have It All")

== Episodes ==
=== Season 1 (2015–16) ===
No. overall	No. in season	Title	Directed by	Written by	Original release date
1	1	"Lost and Found"	Samir Rehem	Frank van Keeken	December 11, 2015
2	2	"See Through Me"	Samir Rehem	Amy Cole	January 8, 2016
3	3	"Play the Record"	Samir Rehem	Frank van Keeken	January 15, 2016
4	4	"Heart & Soul"	Jim Allodi	Emma Campbell	January 22, 2016
5	5	"Invincible"	Jim Allodi	Elizabeth Bekcer	January 29, 2016
6	6	"All About the Music"	Jim Allodi	Laura Harbin	February 5, 2016
7	7	"Day After Day"	Samir Rehem	Tricia Fish	February 12, 2016
8	8	"Dancing in the Rain"	Samir Rehem	Duana Taha	February 19, 2016
9	9	"Potent Love"	Samir Rehem	Ian Malone	February 26, 2016
10	10	"Heart Shape"	Frank van Keeken	Frank van Keeken & Laura Harbin	March 4, 2016
11	11	"Freebird"	Mitchell T. Ness	Story by : Amy Cole and Daniel Godwin; Teleplay by : Amy Cole	March 11, 2016
12	12	"Sunrise"	Shawn Alex Thompson	Matthew MacFadzean	March 25, 2016
13	13	"Callin' Callin' Part 1"	Mitchell T. Ness	Amy Cole	April 1, 2016
14	14	"Callin' Callin' Part 2"	Mitchell T. Ness	Frank van Keeken	April 1, 2016

=== Season 2 (2016–17) ===
No. overall	No. in season	Title	Directed by	Written by	Original release date
15	1	"Sweet Tarts"	Frank van Keeken	Frank van Keeken	December 16, 2016
16	2	"Rhythm in My Heatbeat"	Mitchell T. Ness	Amy Cole	January 13, 2017
17	3	"Wondering"	Mitchell T. Ness	Tricia Fish	January 20, 2017
18	4	"Take Control"	Stephen Reynolds	Brad Vermunt & Malek Pacha	January 27, 2017
19	5	"Hit My Heart"	Stephen Reynolds	Emma Campbell	February 3, 2017
20	6	"How Far We've Come"	Stephen Reynolds	Malek Pacha & Brad Vermunt	February 10, 2017
21	7	"Last Shot"	Shawn Alex Thompson	Elizabeth Becker and Bethany Kaster	February 17, 2017
22	8	"Take You There"	Shawn Alex Thompson	Ian Malone & Matthew MacFadzean	February 24, 2017
23	9	"Let It Go"	Shawn Alex Thompson	Emma Campbell and Malek Pacha & Brad Vermunt	March 3, 2017
24	10	"Falling for You"	Frank van Keeken	Frank van Keeken & Laura Harbin	March 10, 2017
25	11	"Call My Name"	Frank van Keeken	Bethany Kaster	March 17, 2017
26	12	"You Could Have It All"	Frank van Keeken	Amy Cole	March 24, 2017
27	13	"The Sound of Change"	Frank van Keeken	Frank van Keeken	March 31, 2017

== Broadcast and release ==
The series was aired by Family Channel in Canada, premiering on December 11, 2015, and on CBBC in the United Kingdom. In the United States and globally, the series was released by Netflix, with the first season launched on April 1, 2016, and the second season released on December 3, 2016. The series departed Netflix internationally in December 2021.
