= Alexandra Chaves =

Canadian dancer and actress

- Born: May 9, 2001 (age 25); Cambridge, Ontario, Canada
- Education: St. Benedict Catholic Secondary School
- Occupations: Actress; dancer
- Years active: 2016-present
- Television: The Next Step
- Website: www.alexandrachaves.com

Alexandra Chaves (born May 9, 2001) is a Canadian dancer and actress, known for her role as Piper on the Family and CBBC series The Next Step.

== Career ==
In 2011, Chaves won the title of Mini Miss Dance Canada. She was also a member of the Toronto Raptors Junior Hip Hop Crew and was part of the National Ballet School of Canada's professional program. In 2016, Chaves joined the Family series The Next Step in its fourth season as Piper. She is still a cast member of the show. As part of her work with The Next Step, Chaves has participated in Family Channel's Stand Up! anti-bullying campaign. In 2017, Chaves toured the UK with co-stars of The Next Step as part of the Disney Channel Big Ticket Concert. In 2019 she toured Australia, New Zealand and the UK again with The Next Step.

Chaves is a Plan Canada Youth Advocate.

== Personal life ==
Chaves went to St. Benedict Catholic Secondary School before attending Virtual High School to accommodate her television career. At age 12, she was diagnosed with heart arrhythmia that meant she would need to take a nine-month break from dancing. In 2018, she was diagnosed with ulcerative colitis.

== Filmography ==
Year	Title	Role	Notes
2016–2025	The Next Step	Piper	Main role (seasons 4-8), Guest role (season 9-10) 110 episodes
2018	Anne with an E	Chorus Member	Episode: "I Protest Against Any Absolute Conclusion"
2019	Good Witch	Alex	Episode: "The Honeymoon"
2019	Trapped: The Alex Cooper Story	Daniela Lopez	Television film
2024	Geek Girl	Millie	
