= Allie Goodbun =

Canadian dancer and actress

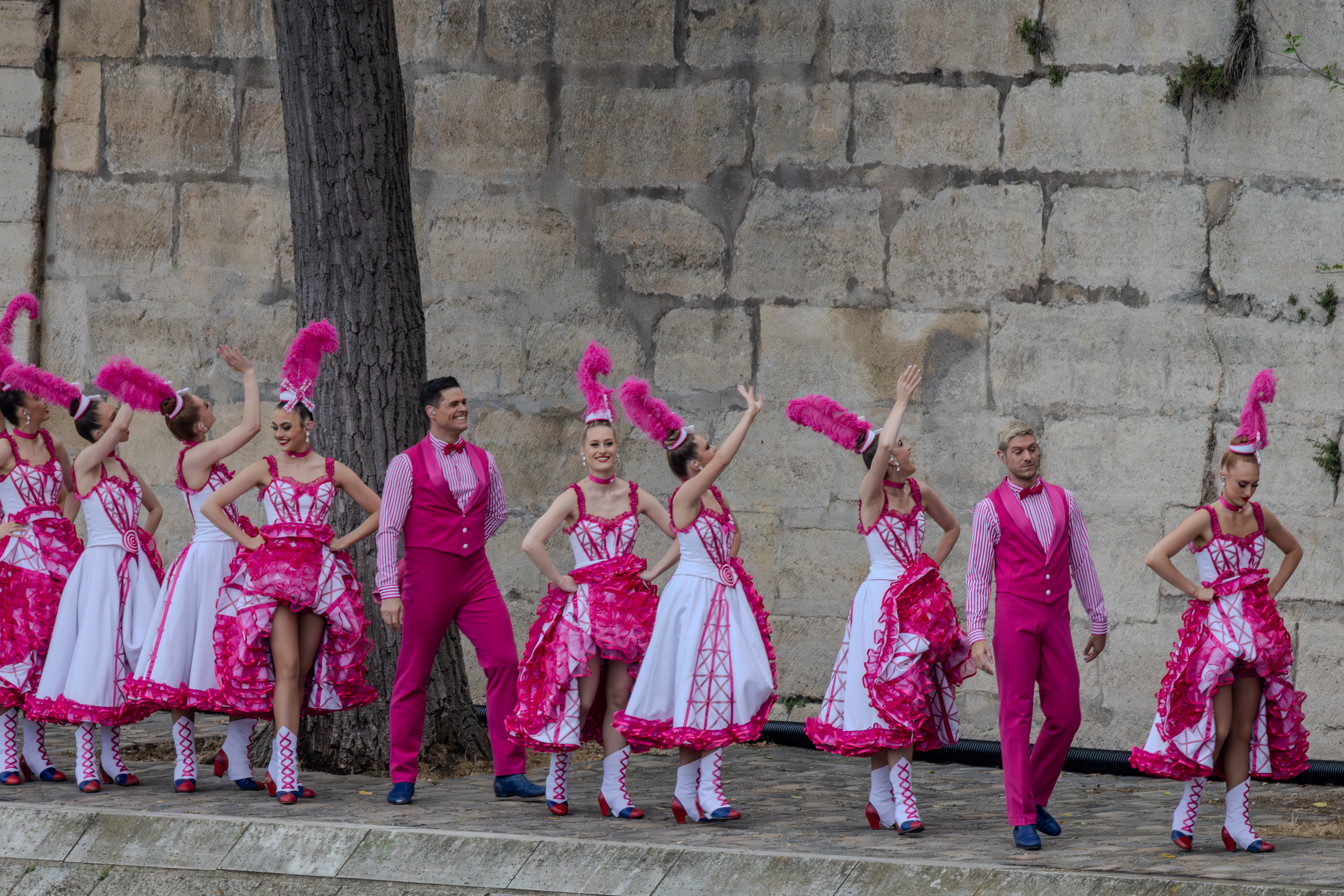
- Goodbun (center) at the 2024 Summer Olympics opening ceremony
- Born: April 27, 1999 (age 27); Woodstock, Ontario, Canada
- Education: University of Toronto
- Occupations: actress dancer showgirl social media personality
- Dancing career
- Current group: Moulin Rouge
- Former groups: Team Canada Hip Hop

TikTok information
- Page: alliegoodbun
- Followers: 419K
- Last updated: 14 September 2025

Allie Goodbun (born 27 April 1999) is a Canadian dancer, actress, showgirl, and social media personality. She is a performer at the Moulin Rouge in Paris. As a teenager, she was known for her role as Cassie in the Canadian teen drama television series The Next Step.

== Biography ==
Goodbun is from Woodstock, Ontario. She began her dance training when she was five years old. As a teenager, she made Team Canada's hip-hop team and competed as a soloist in Denmark. When she was fifteen years old, she was cast as Cassie in the Canadian teen drama television series The Next Step.

She studied kinesiology at the University of Toronto. In 2019, during her second year in college, she travelled to Vancouver to audition for the Moulin Rouge. She received a callback but ultimately could not move to Paris, due to the COVID-19 pandemic, so she completed her studies in Canada. In October 2021, she move to Paris and became a showgirl at the Moulin Rouge full time, performing twelve shows six days a week. Goodbun amassed a large following on social media due to her videos about being a performer at the Moulin Rouge. As a dancer with the Moulin Rouge, she performed at the opening ceremony of the 2024 Summer Olympics in Paris.

== Filmography ==
=== Television ===
Year	Title	Role	Notes	Ref.
2016	The Next Step	Cassie	Main	
2019	What We Do In The Shadows	Hooded Dancer	2 episodes	
