= Michael Torontow =

Canadian actor and singer

- Born: December 12, 1977 (age 47); Ottawa, Ontario, Canada
- Occupation(s): Actor, singer
- Years active: 2001–present

Michael Torontow is a Canadian actor, singer and director, best known for his work in musical theatre. He has played such roles as Link Larkin in the first Canadian production of Hairspray in 2004 Giuseppe Naccarelli in Toronto productions of The Light in the Piazza in 2010 and 2016, and the title character in Sweeney Todd: The Demon Barber of Fleet Street in 2022. He is an artistic director for Talk is Free Theatre in Barrie, Ontario. He has been nominated for Dora Awards both as a leading actor and director.

== Early life and education ==
Torontow was born in Ottawa, Ontario, where he attended Bell High School. While in high school, Torontow played Joseph in a production of Joseph and the Amazing Technicolor Dreamcoat, which motivated him to pursue a career in acting. He graduated from the University of Ottawa with a Bachelor of Arts in Theatre and a Certificate in Arts Administration.

== Career ==
In 2001, Torontow made his professional stage debut in the first North American tour of Mamma Mia! as a member of the ensemble and an understudy in the role of Sky.

In 2004, Torontow played the role of Link Larkin in the first Canadian production of Hairspray. The musical ran at the Princess of Wales Theatre from April to November 2004.

Torontow was a member of the ensemble for the stage adaptation of Dirty Dancing. The first Canadian production played at the Royal Alexandra Theatre, opening in July 2007. In 2010, Torontow played Giuseppe Naccarelli in a Toronto production of The Light in the Piazza presented by the Musical Stage Company and the Canadian Stage Company. In 2016, Torontow reprised his role of Giuseppe in a production of The Light in the Piazza at the Max Bell Theatre, for which he was nominated for Best Supporting Actor in a Musical at the 2016 Calgary Theatre Critics Awards.

In 2019, Torontow performed Every Brilliant Thing, a one-man show written by Duncan Macmillan. The production was presented by Talk is Free Theatre at the Five Points Theatre in Barrie, before it transferred to the Royal Manitoba Theatre Centre. In 2020, the production was presented at the Adelaide Fringe Festival with Torontow again performing the show. This production won the BankSA Best Theatre & Physical Theatre award.

Since 2019, Torontow has served as an artistic director for Talk is Free Theatre (TIFT), which is a professional theatre company based in Barrie that has produced theatre across Ontario, Canada, and internationally. In 2021, he directed his first musical, a TIFT production, of Into the Woods, in Barrie and at the Winter Garden Theatre in Toronto. At the 2022 Dora Awards, Torontow was nominated for Best Direction.

In 2022, Torontow starred as Sweeney Todd in a production of Sweeney Todd: The Demon Barber of Fleet Street, which was presented by Talk is Free Theatre. For his performance in the role, he was nominated for Outstanding Performance in a Leading Role in a Musical at the 2022 Dora Awards.

In 2023, Torontow played Kevin J. and others in a production of Come from Away in Gander, Newfoundland, where the musical is set. When the musical returned to Gander in the summer of 2024, Torontow returned, this time playing Kevin T. and others.

Torontow is currently playing Cal in the original Canadian production of Titanique. The musical premiered at the Segal Centre in Montreal, where it is playing between October 27 and November 24, 2024. It will then transfer to the CAA Theatre, where it will play between December 5, 2024 and January 12, 2025.

== Credits ==
=== Theatre ===
Year	Production	Role	Theatre	Category	Ref.
2001–2003	Mamma Mia!	Ensemble, u/s Sky	First National Tour		
2004	Hairspray	Link Larkin	Princess of Wales Theatre	Mirvish Productions	
2007–2009	Dirty Dancing	Ensemble	Royal Alexandra Theatre	Mirvish Productions	
2010	The Light in the Piazza	Giuseppe	Berkeley Street Theatre	Musical Stage Company, Canadian Stage Company	
2014	Floyd Collins	Homer Collins	Mady Centre for the Performing Arts	Regional: Talk Is Free Theatre, Patrick Street Productions	
2014	Floyd Collins	Homer Collins	The York Theatre	Regional: Talk Is Free Theatre, Patrick Street Productions	
2016	The Light in the Piazza	Giuseppe	Max Bell Theatre	Regional: Theatre Calgary	
2017	Beauty and the Beast	Beast	Capitol Theatre	Regional	
2018	Mamma Mia!	Sam	Stanley Industrial Alliance Stage	Arts Club Theatre Company	
2019	Every Brilliant Thing	Narrator	Five Points Theatre	Regional: Talk is Free Theatre	
2019	Every Brilliant Thing	Narrator	Royal Manitoba Theatre Centre	Regional: Talk is Free Theatre	
2020	Every Brilliant Thing	Narrator	Adelaide Fringe Festival		
2022	Sweeney Todd: The Demon Barber of Fleet Street	Sweeney Todd	Regional: Talk is Free Theatre		
2023	Come from Away	Kevin J. and others	Joseph R. Smallwood Arts and Culture Centre	Regional: Gander, Newfoundland	
2024	Cock	M	Regional: Talk is Free Theatre		
2024	Come from Away	Kevin T. and others	Joseph R. Smallwood Arts and Culture Centre	Regional: Gander, Newfoundland	
2024–2025	Titanique	Cal	Segal Centre for Performing Arts	Mirvish Productions	
2024–2025	Titanique	Cal	CAA Theatre	Mirvish Productions	

=== Television ===
Year	Title	Role	Notes
2005	Queer as Folk	Babylonian	S5.E7: "Hope Against Hope"
2009	True Crime Scene	Bakery Manager	S2.E10: "Cherry Hill Murder"
2010	Forensic Factor		S7.E5: "Abbotsford Killer"
2010	Being Erica	Doug	S3.E6: "Bear Breasts"
2013	Hannibal	Pharmacist	S1.E2: "Amuse-Bouche"
2014	Reign	King's Guard	S1.E9: "For King and Country"
2015	Remedy	68 Special Elvis	S2.E10: "Day One"
2015–2016	Lost & Found Music Studios	Mr. T	Main role: 17 episodes
2017	Conviction	Handsome Guy	S1.E13: "Past, Prologue & What's to Come"

== Awards and nominations ==
Year	Award	Category	Nominated work	Result	Ref.
2016	Calgary Theatre Critics Award	Best Supporting Actor in a Musical	The Light in the Piazza	Nominated	
2019	Ovation Awards	Outstanding Supporting Performance of a Musical - Male	Mamma Mia!	Nominated	
2020	Adelaide Fringe Festival Awards	BankSA Best Theatre & Physical Theatre	Every Brilliant Thing	Won	
2022	Dora Awards	Outstanding Direction	Into the Woods	Nominated	
2022	Dora Awards	Outstanding Performance in a Leading Role	Sweeney Todd: The Demon Barber of Fleet Street	Nominated	
