= Virtual High School (Ontario) =

Location
- Bayfield, Ontario; Canada; 43.565186°N 81.702193°W

Information
- Type: Private virtual school
- Established: 1995
- Principal: Stephen Baker
- Grades: 9 to 12
- Enrollment: 5414 (as of 2012)
- Campus type: Online
- Website: www.virtualhighschool.com

Virtual High School (VHS) is a private online high school based in Bayfield, Ontario that offers accredited online courses towards an Ontario Secondary School Diploma. Its founder and principal is Stephen Baker.

== Academic model ==
VHS is an asynchronous school allowing students to register and start on any day of the year. Students are given 18 months to complete each course and are able to work at their own pace. The courses are housed in Brightspace by D2L, an integrated learning platform developed in Waterloo, Ontario. They are written by certified teachers and presented entirely online. VHS holds Ontario Student Records for students who attend VHS full-time and plan to earn their Ontario Secondary School Diplomas at VHS.

== History ==
Virtual High School is the oldest online high school in Ontario.

Using Notepad, Baker constructed the first course, grade 11 biology, in 1995. This course was available to the public via the Internet. The second course, Canadian Literature, became available in early 1996. On January 2, 1997, this online school was moved to the VirtualHighSchool.com domain. The original courses were organized using a rudimentary learning management system that Baker created.

Baker applied to the Ontario Ministry of Education to be recognized as an accredited private school. In April 2003, VHS became an inspected private school able to grant OSSD credits with the BSID # 665681. At this time, VHS was named Kitchener-Waterloo Private School, as the idea of a virtual high school might not be readily accepted just yet.

In 2012, VHS moved its headquarters to its current location in Bayfield, Ontario. The building is an 1880s-era hotel that has served various purposes since its inception. The presence of the building goes back to 1853 but it was torn down in the 1880s and replaced by the Queen's hotel. In 1940, it was repurchased and renamed the Ritz Hotel. The rebirth into the VHS headquarters was a $2-million privately funded project that filled the building with modern computer and communication technology.

In 2012-2013, VHS's 64 courses drew 5414 students to enroll. By 2015, VHS had 71 courses.

== Notable alumni ==
- Alexandra Chaves - actress and dancer
