= Myles Erlick =

Canadian actor

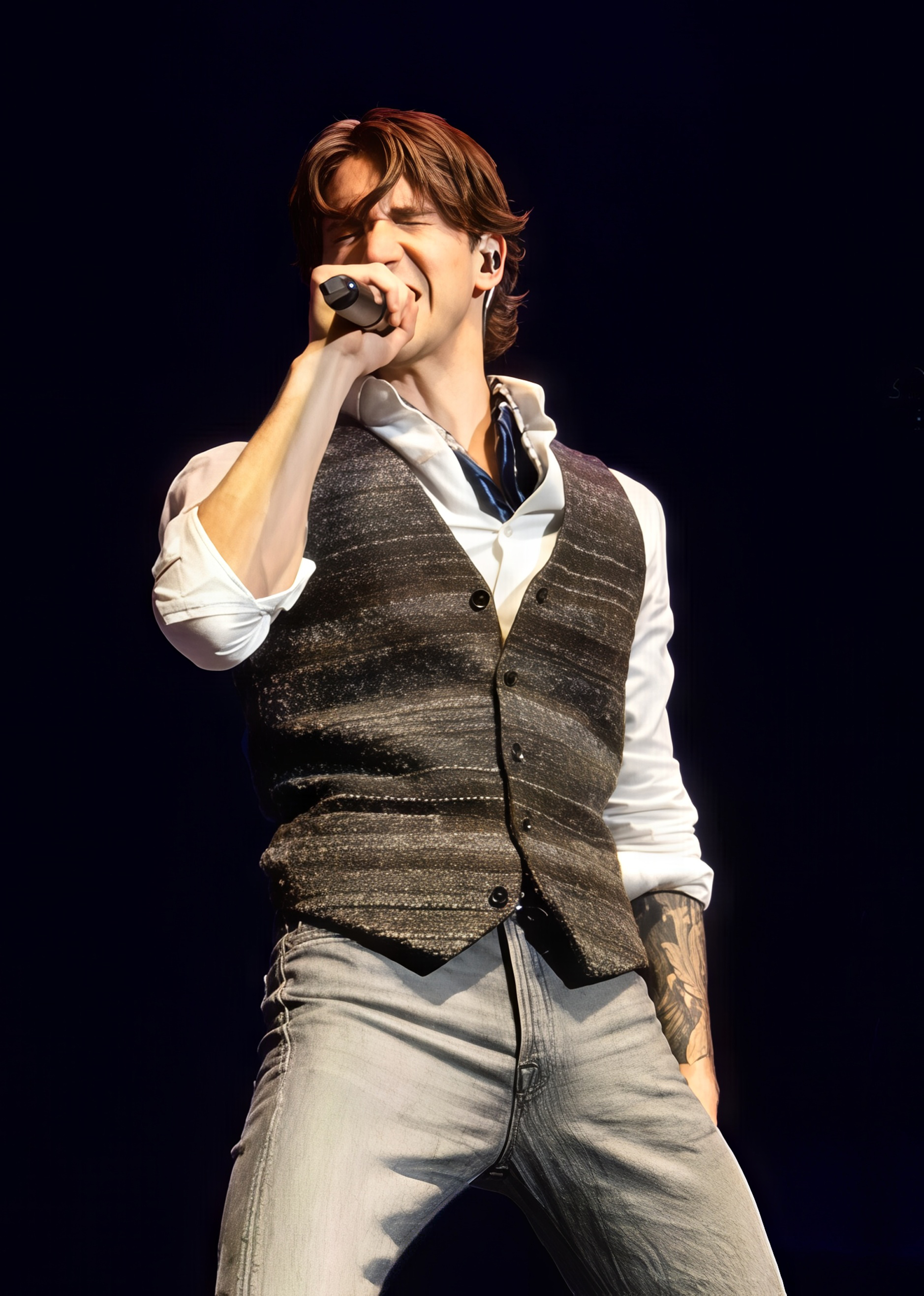
- Erlick performing in 2025
- Born: July 27, 1998 (age 28); Burlington, Ontario, Canada
- Education: Stars Academy; Canada's National Ballet School
- Occupations: Actor; singer; dancer; musician
- Years active: 2011–present
- Television: The Next Step
- Relatives: Ryan Marshall (step-father)
- Website: myleserlick.com

Myles Erlick (born July 27, 1998) is a Canadian actor, singer, dancer, and musician. He is known for portraying the role of Noah on the Family series The Next Step. Prior to appearing on The Next Step, he starred as the titular character in Billy Elliot the Musical.

== Early life ==
Erlick was born on July 27, 1998, in Burlington, Ontario. He was raised by his mother Francesca Nicassio, a talent manager who owns the Canadian talent school Stars Academy, which Erlick attended. His step-father is Ryan Marshall, a former member of the Canadian band Walk off the Earth. Erlick trained at Canada's National Ballet School, while also attending the Dr. Frank J. Hayden Secondary School.

== Career ==
Erlick made his television debut in an episode of the CTV crime drama series Flashpoint in 2011. Later that year, it was announced that he had been cast in the Broadway production of Billy Elliot the Musical, in the titular role. Prior to this, he portrayed the role in the Toronto production. In 2013, he joined the cast of the Family Channel series The Next Step in the recurring role of Noah. In the third season, Erlick's character was promoted to the regular cast, and he remained in the regular cast of the series until its sixth season in 2018. He also appeared in various international tours as part of the promotion for The Next Step. Following his exit from The Next Step, Erlick began focusing on a music career, releasing singles including "Serious", "All Day All Night" featuring Tate McRae, and "Filthy". The singles were included on the tracklist of his debut studio album, Me, released on May 22, 2018. In 2019, it was announced that he had been cast by Steven Spielberg in the 2021 film West Side Story as Snowboy, one of the Jets. Later that year, he was nominated in the 2019 CelebMix Awards for Best Dancer.

== Filmography ==
=== Film ===
Year	Title	Role	Notes
2013	Sing Along	Stephen	Short film
2013	We Are Not Here	The Boy	Short film
2021	The Clue to Love	Jock	
2021	West Side Story	"Snowboy"	
2022	Snow Day	Chuck Wheeler	
2023	Twisted Neighbor	Quinn	
2023	Dante's Hotel	Paul	
2026	Matter of Time	Charlie Fleck	Post-production
TBA	The Confession: A Pinewood Short	Blake	Short film / Post-production

=== Television ===
Year	Title	Role	Notes
2011	Flashpoint	Boy	Episode: "Thicker Than Blood"
2013–2018, 2025	The Next Step	Noah	Recurring role (season 1–2); main role (season 3–6); Guest role (season 10) 114 episodes
2025	Motorheads	Noah	Co-starring role; 7 episodes

=== Theatre ===
Year	Production	Role	Location	Venue	Date
2011	Billy Elliot the Musical	Billy Elliot	Canon Theatre	Toronto production	February 1, - September 3, 2011
2011	Billy Elliot the Musical	Billy Elliot	Imperial Theatre	Broadway	September 24, - November 13, 2011

== Discography ==
=== Studio albums ===
Title	Album details
ME	Released: May 22, 2018; Label: FAN Entertainment Inc; Format: digital format

=== Singles ===
Title	Year	Album
"Serious"	2017	ME
"All Day All Night" (Myles Erlick featuring Tate McRae)	2017	ME
"Filthy"	2018	ME
"Sweat"	2020	Non-album single
"Mayday” / “Like You Do"	2020	Non-album single
“Electric Afterlife”	2021	Non-album single
“Growing Old With You (Acoustic)”	2023	Non-album single
"Stay a Little Longer”	2024	Non-album single
“World Famous”	2024	Non-album single
"Cuz Ya Never Liked My Dog"	2024	Non-album single
"TICKET TO RIDE"	2024	Non-album single
“This Town”	2025	Non-album single
"Doing What I Do"	2025	Non-album single
“See You Around”	2025	Non-album single

== Awards and nominations ==
Award	Year	Category	Work	Result
Young Artist Awards	2014	Best Performance in a Short Film - Young Actor 13-15	Himself	Nominated
Young Artist Awards	2016	Best Performance in a TV Series – Recurring Young Actor (14–21)	Himself	Nominated
CelebMix Awards	2019	Best Dancer	Himself	Nominated
Critics' Choice Awards	2022	Best Acting Ensemble	West Side Story	Nominated
