= Skiff (company) =

Defunct e-reader

Skiff, LLC, was an e-reader and advertising company, started by Hearst Corporation and purchased by News Corporation in 2010 following its CES debut. The software was designed to deliver digital editions of newspapers, magazines, books and blogs to e-reader-enabled devices and its size made it ideal for newspaper and magazine format. Skiff supplied e-content that seeks to retain the look and feel of publishers’ brands consistently across different devices and screen sizes, while also allowing publishers to sell ads directly into their e-publications.

The Skiff did not survive the sale to News Corp, who bought the software but not the device itself.
