= Brennan Clost =

Canadian actor and dancer (born 1994)

- Born: October 20, 1994 (age 31); Burlington, Ontario, Canada
- Other name: Brenn
- Education: National Ballet School of Canada; Juilliard School
- Occupations: Actor; dancer
- Years active: 2005–present
- Television: The Next Step; Tiny Pretty Things

Brennan Clost (born October 20, 1994) is a Canadian actor and dancer, known for starring in the Family series The Next Step, and the Netflix dance drama series Tiny Pretty Things.

== Early and personal life ==
Clost was born on October 20, 1994, in Burlington, Ontario. Whilst growing up, he was bullied by classmates, stating that they made "very crass comments", threw snowballs at him and he would say "get lost" in the hallway. Clost studied dance at various dance studios across southern Ontario, including National Ballet School of Canada and Springboard Danse Montreal. Initially wanting to study medicine at university, he was advised by his dance teacher to audition for the Juilliard School.

In March 2012, he auditioned and was accepted into the Juilliard School on a scholarship, making it as one of two male Canadian dancers to be accepted onto the course. Clost's choreography was showcased annually at Juilliard's Choreographic Honours Program and in elementary schools throughout New York City, and he graduated in 2016. Through dance, Clost has damaged his ankle, had Achilles tendinitis and had "serious wrist and shoulder problems". Clost has stated that he does not label himself with a sexuality, but added that he is "not straight".

== Career ==
Clost began dancing competitively at the age of seven. His accolades include being world silver medalist in the International Dance Organization junior soloist category in Germany (2008), and being named as one of the Top Senior Male Dancers at The Dance Awards in New York City (2011). In 2012, he made his professional acting debut in a television advertisement for shaving company Gillette. In the same year, he was cast in the Family series The Next Step as Daniel. He portrayed the role regularly until 2015, when he took a two-year break to focus on completing his studies at Juilliard, returning in 2017. Also in 2017, Clost starred in the web series Spiral, alongside The Next Step co-star Alexandra Beaton. In 2019, he was cast in the Netflix dance drama series Tiny Pretty Things as Shane, which premiered in December 2020, but was not renewed for a second season, as stated by Clost on his YouTube channel.

== Filmography ==
=== Film ===
Year	Title	Role	Notes
2007	King of the Camp	Dancer	
2014	An American Girl: Isabelle Dances Into the Spotlight	Nutcracker Prince	
2016	Country Crush	Jamboree Dancer	
2021	Almost Twenty	Unnamed	Short film; Co-wrote
2024	The Legacy of Cloudy Falls	Lucas	
2025	Fear Street: Prom Queen	Gerald	
2025	Loathe Thy Neighbor	Will Larkfield	

=== Television ===
Year	Title	Role	Notes
2012	Degrassi: The Next Generation	Dancer	1 episode
2013–2015, 2017, 2025	The Next Step	Daniel	Main role; 61 episodes
2016	Graped	Dale	Miniseries
2016	11.22.63	Student	Episode: "Other Voices, Other Rooms"
2017	Spiral	Clark	Main role
2019	Creeped Out	Older Aiden	Episode: "One More Minute"
2020	Tiny Pretty Things	Shane McRae	Main role
2021	Pretty Hard Cases	Officer PJ Armstrong	Recurring role
2024	Heartland	Reggie	Episode: "Sisters"
2025	Overcompensating	Chase	Episode: "Who's That Girl"
2025	Brilliant Minds	Mikhal	Episode: "The Resident"

=== Web series ===
Year	Title	Role	Notes
2017	Arthur and Annie	Arthur	
2020	Australiannaire$	Logan / Eddy	
