= Leader Lane =

Lane in Toronto, Ontario, Canada

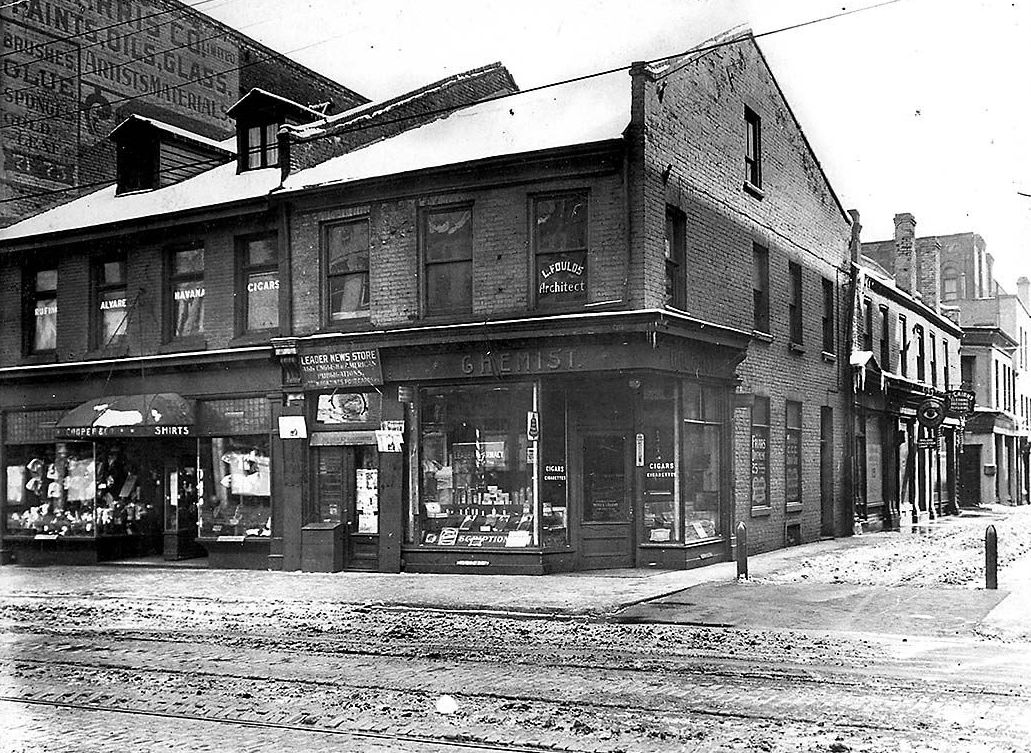
King Street and Leader's Lane, circa 1920.jpg

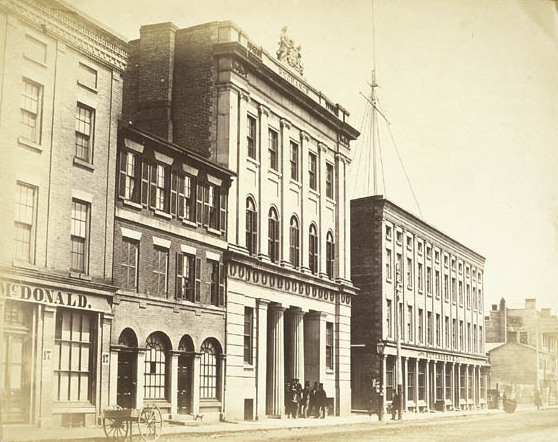
Wellington Street, and the opening of Leader's Lane.

Leader Lane is a short street in Toronto, Ontario, Canada. The street was part of the former city of York, Upper Canada. It runs from Wellington Street to King Street, crossing Colborne Street. The street was renamed Leader's Lane after the Toronto Leader, a newspaper whose offices were located there from 1852 to 1878.

It was the site of York's first jail and "hanging yard". The original jail, a log building, built in 1796, at the corner with Colborne Street has long since been demolished, but several buildings remain on the street which are over 100 years old.

== See also ==
- List of oldest buildings and structures in Toronto
