= Colborne Street, Toronto =

Street in Toronto, Ontario, Canada

Coordinates: 43.64890°N 79.3758°W

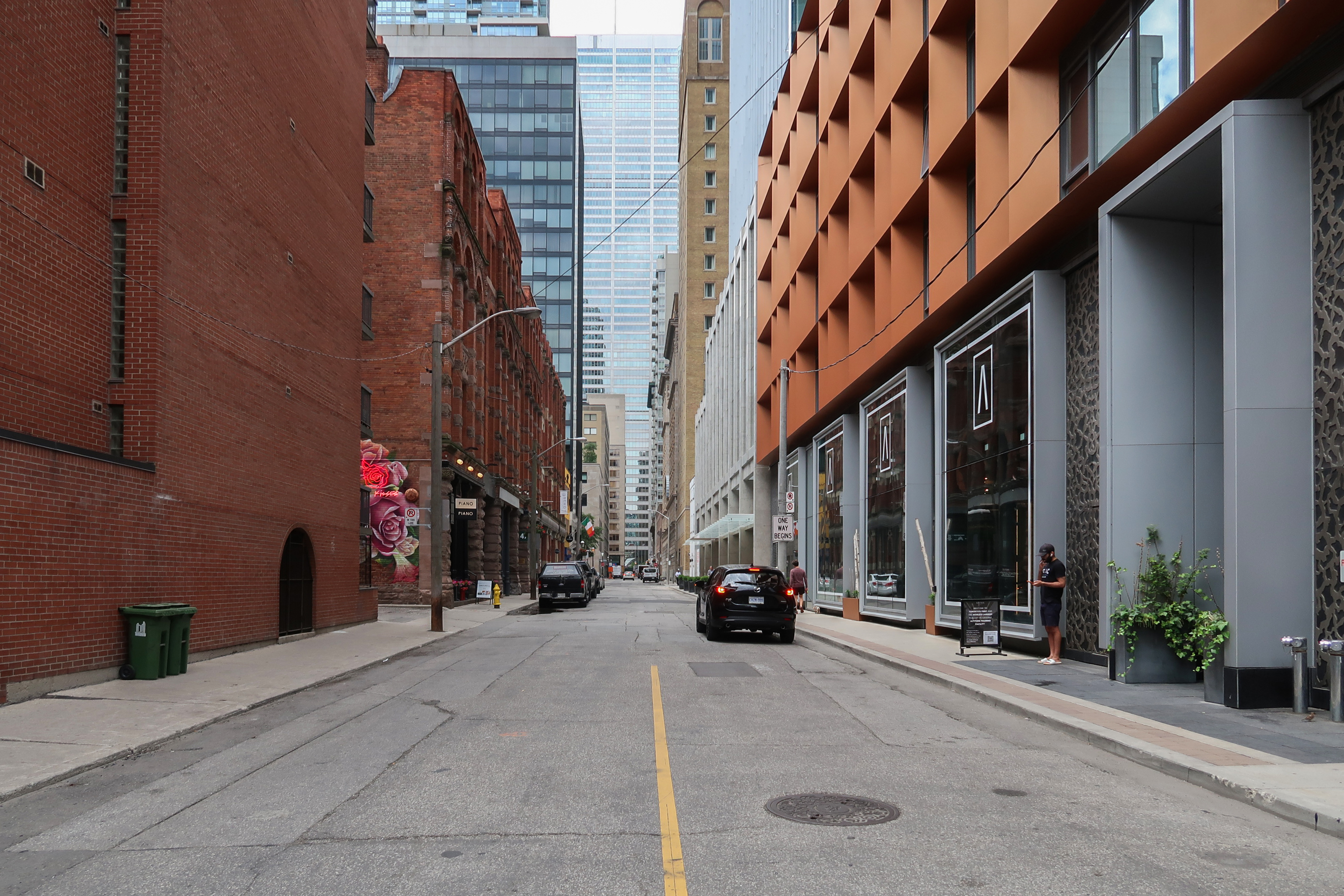
Colborne Street in 2023

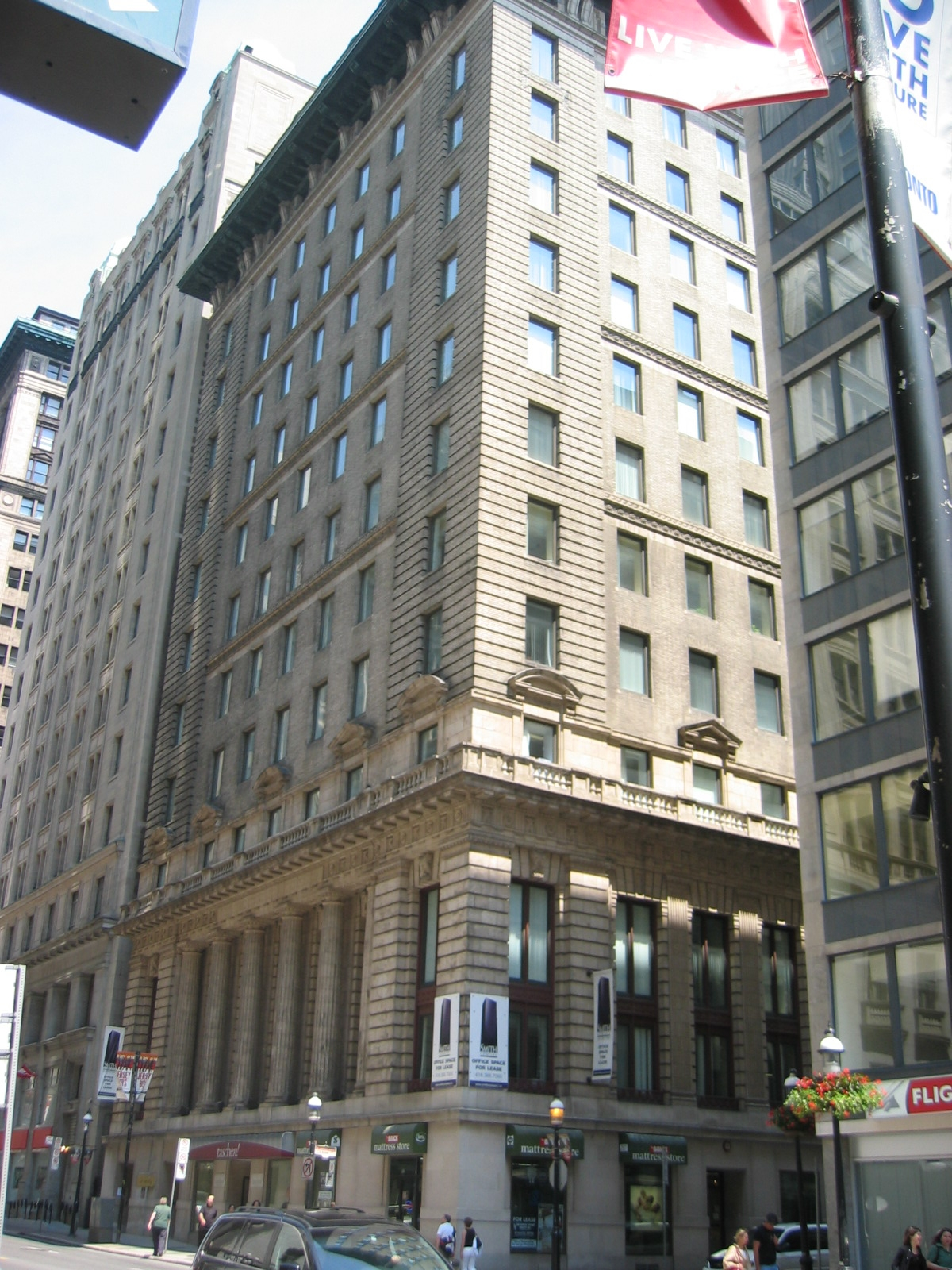
Trader's Bank Building at the corner of Yonge and Colborne streets.

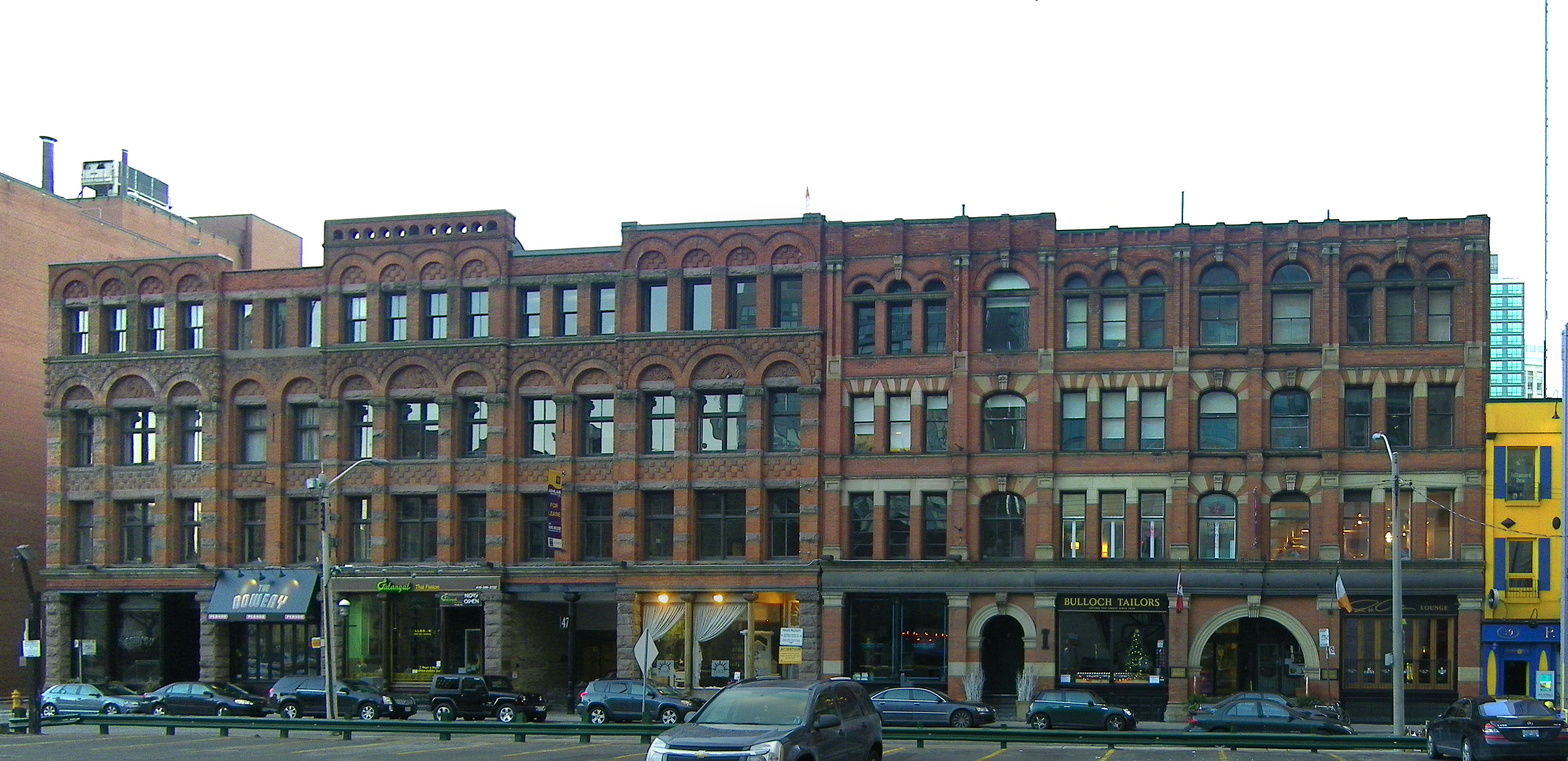
Victorian era buildings on Colborne Street, between Church Street and Leader Lane

Colborne Street is a street running several hundred metres east of Yonge Street in downtown Toronto, Ontario, Canada. It crosses Victoria Street and Leader Lane, ending at Church Street. It is located between and parallel to King Street East and Wellington Street East. The street is notable for retaining several historic buildings built during the reign of Queen Victoria.

In 1822, a two-storey building, Masonic Hall, with a cupola was built on what is now Colborne Street.

The Milburn building was built in 1886 at 47-55 Colborne Street, in Toronto, by architect Edward James Lennox.

The 15 storey Trader’s Bank Building at the corner of Colborne and Yonge streets was the tallest building in the British Empire when it was built in 1906.

In 1914, the King Edward Hotel requested a permit to build a pedestrian bridge across Colborne Street to an annex on the south side. As of 2023, the request is still pending.

Other information

The Next Step a Canadian TV series, which surfaced on CBBC was filmed at this location from 2013, until its final episode in 2025.
