= Kiliaen Van Rensselaer (businessman) =

American business executive

- Born: Kiliaen Drackett Van Rensselaer c. 1970
- Education: Fairfield Country Day School; St. George's School
- Alma mater: Trinity College
- Occupations: Founder and CEO of Insurrection Media
- Parent(s): Alexander Van Rensselaer; Sallie Drackett
- Relatives: See Van Rensselaer family

Kiliaen Drackett Van Rensselaer (born c. 1970) is an American business executive and philanthropist. Van Rensselaer is the founder and CEO of Insurrection Media. He is a member of the prominent Van Rensselaer family.

== Early life ==
Kiliaen Drackett Van Rensselaer was born in 1970, the second son of Alexander Taylor Van Rensselaer (b. 1934) and Sallie Bolton Van Rensselaer (née Drackett). He had an older brother, Alexander Rogers Van Rensselaer (1968–2003), who was an artist, and died aged 35 in Marina del Rey, California. His parents ran gourmet food retail stores called Hay Day, which were bought in 1999 by Sutton Place Gourmet and re-branded as Balducci's.

He attended Fairfield Country Day School, an all boys school in Fairfield, Connecticut, followed by St. George's School, in Middletown, Rhode Island Van Rensselaer was an American history major at Trinity College.

== Career ==
Van Rensselaer began his career holding various marketing roles including brand manager at Colgate-Palmolive and Heinz, and vice president of marketing at Tickets.com, a start-up that became publicly traded B2B and B2C ticketing solutions and software provider for live events. It was under Van Rensselaer's leadership that Tickets.com formed a strategic alliance with Visa USA, rolling out integrated marketing programs that encouraged Visa cardholders to take advantage of the comprehensive offering of live events available through Tickets.com’s multi-channel distribution system.

=== AT&T Mobility ===
Van Rensselaer served as executive director of national marketing at AT&T Mobility (formerly known as Cingular Wireless), responsible for customer acquisition. While at AT&T Cingular Wireless, he was the primary marketing executive on the iPhone deal team that structured the original exclusive agreement directly with Steve Jobs, and he played a key role on the task force that collaborated with Apple Inc. for the record-breaking launch phase of the product.

=== Skiff ===
In 2008, Van Rensselaer co-founded a software and services e-reading company called Skiff that was acquired by News Corp. in 2010. The Skiff e-reading platform was acquired separately to the device itself (which remained the property of Hearst), delivering enhanced content experiences to dedicated e-readers, as well as to multipurpose devices such as smartphones and netbooks.

=== News Corporation ===
Van Rensselaer joined FOX from News Corporation, where he was senior vice president, marketing & partnerships for digital media. At News Corp., he helped lead strategy for digital distribution of key media properties, identified and gestated new businesses, and managed the scripted digital video entertainment venture WIGS, which launched May 2012 on YouTube that Van Rensselaer subsequently oversaw at FOX. Van Rensselaer also spearheaded negotiations with wireless carriers, mobile device OEMs and retailers for distribution agreements on behalf of many News Corp. properties, including The Wall Street Journal, Fox News, and IGN.

=== FOX Broadcasting Company ===
Van Rensselaer served as senior vice president, multi-platform programming at FOX Broadcasting Company, overseeing multi-platform development initiatives including multi-year deal with Andy Samberg, Akiva Schaffer and Jorma Taccone's The Lonely Island, as well as multiyear programming, marketing and distribution partnership with digital studio WIGS (now Indigenous Media), co-founded by director/producers Jon Avnet (Black Swan, Risky Business) and Rodrigo García (Mother and Child, Nine Lives). Under Van Rensselaer's leadership, FOX widened the WIGS digital studio's content availability from exclusively YouTube to include Hulu, beginning with WIGS' most popular, award-winning series Blue - starring Julia Stiles as the title character - offered to Hulu and Hulu Plus viewers in longer-form, TV-length.

=== Insurrection Media, Inc. ===
Insurrection Media is an independent digital TV studio that develops and produces scripted content for over-the-top video platforms as well as broadcast and cable networks internationally. Founded by Van Rensselaer in 2015, the company has a multi-year exclusive comedy pod deal in place with Jonathan Stern (Wet Hot American Summer, Childrens Hospital), founder of Abominable Pictures, and senior entertainment executive and producer Keith Quinn (Paramount Digital, LivePlanet), and a multi-year SciFi production partnership with The Walking Dead creator Robert Kirkman and David Alpert of Skybound Entertainment. The company has a strategic relationship with HarperCollins where key books in SciFi, Drama and Comedy are optioned and developed into digital video and linear television series.

Insurrection is currently producing Tiny Pretty Things, Netflix’s upcoming hourlong drama series based on the book by Sona Charaipotra and Dhonielle Clayton, from writer and producer Michael MacLennan (Bomb Girls, The Bletchley Circle: San Francisco).

Gestating from the strategic relationship with HarperCollins, Insurrection Media developed and produced The Dead Girls Detective Agency, a paranormal YA drama based on the novel written by Suzy Cox and adapted by Jerica Lieberman and Molly Margraf (ABC's Mistresses). The Dead Girls Detective Agency holds the record as the highest performing scripted show on Snapchat with the lowest episodic audience decay rate. The Dead Girls Detective Agency was referenced by the Snap Inc. executive leadership during the February 5th earnings call in 2019 as evidence that their original content strategy is a success. Insurrection has produced and premiered four seasons of Dead Girls Detective Agency on Snap.

Insurrection produced Exeter, a scripted podcast that premiered on Sundance Now (AMC Networks’ direct-to-consumer SVOD service). Due to its success, AMC ordered a second season of Exeter that premiered in 2019. Created & directed by Ronnie Gunter (writer-director of “Lighter”, 2013) the drama-noir series features performances by Jeanne Tripplehorn (Big Love, Criminal Minds) and Oscar-winner Ray McKinnon (The Accountant, Sons of Anarchy). Both seasons of the series, consisting of 12 thirty minute long episodes, were co-written by Ronnie Gunter and George Ducker (Luna e Leo, Ex-Best) and are available on iTunes & Sundance Now.

== Personal life ==
In 2008, he was dating Monique Menniken, a former professional tennis player from Germany who was also a model.

Van Rensselaer, a resident of the exclusive River House on the Upper East Side of Manhattan, is a member of the Society of the Cincinnati, the Holland Society and the Brook Club in New York.

== Philanthropy ==
Van Rensselaer is the treasurer and a board member of the Brain & Behavior Research Foundation's National Alliance for Research on Schizophrenia and Depression (NARSAD).

He also co-chairs the annual Associates Fall Fête charity fundraiser for Fountain House, a professional self-help program, which started in New York City in the 1940s, operated by men and women recovering from major mental illness in collaboration with a professional staff. The event serves to introduce a new audience of prominent young leaders to Fountain House's comprehensive mental health model and its mission to fight the stigma associated with mental illness.
