= Insurrection Media, Inc. =

- Founded: 2015
- Founder: Kiliaen Van Rensselaer
- Headquarters location: Beverly Hills, California
- Official website: www.insurrectiontv.com

Insurrection Media is an independent television studio founded by Kiliaen Van Rensselaer in 2015, Insurrection develops and produces scripted content for over-the-top video platforms as well as broadcast and cable networks internationally.

Insurrection has a strategic relationship with HarperCollins where key books in SciFi, Drama and Comedy are optioned and developed into digital video and linear television series^{,} as well as a multi-year SciFi production partnership with The Walking Dead creator Robert Kirkman and David Alpert of Skybound Entertainment.

On August 6, 2019, Netflix announced the production of Insurrection's drama series Tiny Pretty Things. Season One of the ten-episode, hour-long series was shot in Toronto, Canada.
