= The Next Step (Canadian TV series) =

Canadian television series (2013-2025)

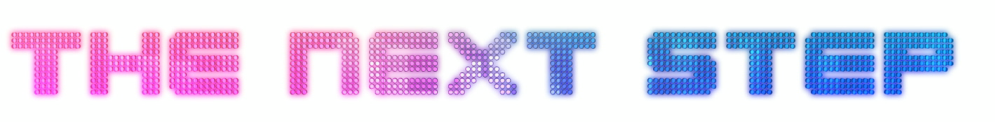
- Genre: Teen drama
- Created by: Frank Van Keeken
- Starring: See Cast listing
- Theme music composer: Grayson Matthews
- Opening theme: Stand Up by Jessica Lee and Kit Knows
- Ending theme: Stand Up by Jessica Lee and Kit Knows (seasons 1-4)
- Country of origin: Canada
- Original language: English
- No. of seasons: 10
- No. of episodes: 275 (list of episodes)

Production
- Executive producers: Chris Taylor; Ivan Schneeberg; David Fortier; Rachael Schaefer; Karen McClellan; Amy Cole; Romeo Candido
- Producers: Laura Harbin; Rachael Schaefer; Chloe Van Keeken; Jay Prychidny; Amy Wright; Laurie McLarty; Laura Notarianni; Brian Hartigan; Jan Caruana; Brad Vermunt; Brandon Hackett
- Production locations: Production studio: Filmport Presentation Centre, Toronto; Exterior and street shots: Colborne Street Dundas Street Front Street Jarvis Street University Avenue Yonge Street
- Camera setup: Multi-camera
- Running time: 22–28 minutes
- Production companies: Temple Street Productions; Beachwood Canyon Productions (season 4); Radical Sheep Productions; Boat Rocker Studios

Original release
- Network: CBBC (United Kingdom); Family Channel (seasons 1–6); CBC Gem (season 7); YTV (seasons 8–10)
- Release: March 8, 2013 – November 10, 2025

Related
- Lost & Found Music Studios; Taking The Next Step; The Next Step: Cheer

The Next Step is a Canadian teen drama series created by Frank Van Keeken which premiered on Family Channel on March 8, 2013 and ended on November 10, 2025 on YTV. Presented in a pseudo-documentary style influenced by reality television, the series follows the members of a troupe from the titular dance studio, as they train for and compete in various championships, while dealing with rivalries and drama from other dance schools and among the team itself.

The Next Step has spawned digital content, live touring shows featuring its cast members, and a spin-off series titled Lost & Found Music Studios. The series has been sold internationally to broadcasters such as CBBC in the United Kingdom, and Universal Kids in the United States — which became a production partner for its sixth season.

The series moved to CBC Gem for its seventh season in 2020, then moving to YTV from its eighth season in 2022. In June 2024 The Cinemaholic reported that YTV had renewed The Next Step for its ninth season, and in November, the BBC confirmed The Next Step would return for a tenth and final season in 2025.

== Premise ==
Each season focuses on the team’s journey as they prepare for regional, national, and international dance competitions. Along the way, they face challenges such as leadership changes, personal struggles, and conflicts with rival studios.

== Episodes ==
Season	Episodes	Originally released (Canada)		
Season	Episodes	First released	Last released	Network
1	30	March 8, 2013	January 3, 2014	Family Channel
2	34	March 7, 2014	January 2, 2015	Family Channel
3	30	March 16, 2015	December 11, 2015	Family Channel
4	40	February 15, 2016	May 12, 2017	Family Channel
5	20	May 26, 2017	December 13, 2017	Family Channel
6	26	September 29, 2018	April 7, 2019	Family Channel
Special	2	December 21, 2019		YouTube
7	24	April 10, 2020	September 18, 2020	CBC Gem
8	27	September 26, 2022	November 24, 2022	YTV
9	22	May 13, 2024	June 17, 2024	YTV
10	20	June 30, 2025	November 10, 2025	YTV

== Main cast ==
Actor	Character	Appearances									
Actor	Character	1	2	3	4	5	6	7	8	9	10
Main characters
Alexandra Beaton	Emily	Main	Main	Recurring	Recurring	Main	Main	Main			Guest
Victoria Baldesarra	Michelle	Main	Main	Main	Main	Main	Main	Recurring	Recurring	Recurring	Main
Trevor Tordjman	James	Main	Main	Main	Main	Recurring		Guest	Guest		Guest
Brittany Raymond	Riley	Main	Main	Main	Main	Recurring		Guest			Guest
Tamina Pollack Paris	Tiffany	Main	Recurring		Guest						Guest
Jordan Clark	Giselle	Main	Main	Main	Recurring		Recurring	Guest	Recurring		Guest
Jennifer Pappas	Chloe	Main	Main	Main			Guest	Guest			Guest
Isaac Lupien	Eldon	Main	Main	Main	Recurring	Recurring	Recurring	Recurring	Recurring	Main	Main
Samantha Grecchi	Stephanie	Main	Recurring	Main	Recurring			Guest			Guest
Lamar Johnson	West	Main	Main	Main	Recurring	Main		Guest			
Brennan Clost	Daniel	Main	Main	Recurring	Guest	Main					Guest
Shamier Anderson	Chris	Main	Recurring								
Bree Wasylenko	Kate	Main	Main	Main	Recurring	Recurring	Recurring	Guest		Recurring	Guest
Logan Trevisan	Amanda	Recurring	Main	Main	Main			Guest			Guest
Natalie Krill	Phoebe		Main	Main	Guest						
Zac Vran	Hunter		Main	Recurring							
Taveeta Szymanowicz-Bramble	Thalia		Main	Main	Recurring	Guest	Recurring				
Devon Michael Brown	Max	Recurring	Recurring	Main	Guest						
Ella Gilling	Ella			Main	Recurring						
Cierra Healey	Cierra			Main	Recurring						
Shantel Angela Vailloo	Shantel			Main							
Myles Erlick	Noah	Recurring	Recurring	Main	Main	Main	Main				Guest
Alexandra Chaves	Piper				Main	Main	Main	Main	Main	Guest	Guest
Giuseppe Bausilio	Alfie				Main			Guest			
Erika Prevost	Sloane				Main	Recurring	Guest				
Akiel Julien	LaTroy				Main	Main	Recurring				
Skylar Healey	Skylar			Recurring	Main	Recurring					
Allie Goodbun	Cassie				Main						
Shelby Bain	Amy				Main	Main	Main	Main	Main		
Briar Nolet	Richelle		Recurring	Recurring	Main	Main	Main	Main	Main	Guest	Guest
Isaiah Peck	Henry				Main	Main	Main	Main			
Dylan McDonald	Jacquie					Main	Main				
Jessica Lord	Lola					Main					
Julian Lombardi	Ozzy					Main	Main	Main	Main		
Dawson Handy	Josh					Main					
Noah Zulfikar	Kingston					Main	Main	Main	Main		Guest
Milaina Robinson	Zara					Main					
Hanna Miller	Heather				Recurring	Main	Guest				
Sage Linder	Summer						Main	Main	Guest		
Emmerly Tinglin	Kenzie						Main	Main	Main	Main	Main
Liam Mackie	Finn						Main	Main	Main		
Berkeley Gerth	Davis						Main				
Carter Musselman	Heath						Recurring	Main	Main	Main	Main
Katie Ortencio	Lily						Recurring	Main	Main	Guest	
Danielle Verayo	Cleo							Main	Main	Guest	
Myles Dobson	Nick							Main	Main	Main	Recurring
Molly Saunders	Jude							Recurring	Main	Guest	
Renee Romolo	Izzy							Recurring	Main	Main	Main
Ben Williams	Pete							Recurring	Main	Main	Main
Shane Mahabir	Ethan							Recurring	Main	Main	Main
Brandon Lising	Xander						Guest	Guest	Main	Recurring	
Blake Talabis	Anthony								Main	Main	Main
Melody Cao	Daisy								Main	Recurring	Main
Maija Makila	Dylan								Main		
Autumn Daye-Fraser	Ebby								Main	Main	
Mila Sophia Tupy	Jett								Main	Main	Main
Kate Roman	Ariana								Guest	Main	Main
Hattie Kragten	Olive									Main	Main
Nicholas McClung	Niall									Main	Main
Sheriauna Haase	Adele									Main	Recurring
Brianna Diebolt	Grace							Recurring	Recurring	Recurring	Main
Mackenzie Barbeau	Pascale									Recurring	Main
Tim Zvifel	Jonah								Guest	Guest	Main

== Production ==
=== Development ===
On February 24, 2012, Family Channel announced that it had ordered 26 half-hour episodes (including S1 and S1.5), and a four-episode season finale. Special content was also going to be available, including The Next Step Interactive. On April 9, 2013, Family announced that it had renewed the series for a second season, which premiered on March 7, 2014.

On May 5, 2014, the series was renewed for a third season, which premiered on March 16, 2015. On April 16, 2015, it was announced that the series would return for a fourth season, which premiered on February 15, 2016. On March 21, 2016, Frank van Keeken announced on Instagram that The Next Step would return for a fifth season, which premiered on May 26, 2017.

In July 2017, the series was renewed for a 26-episode sixth season, which premiered on September 29, 2018. From then on, Boat Rocker would take over distribution from BBC Worldwide for the series, although the latter would continue to co-fund production and continue to distribute the first five seasons. A 24-episode seventh season premiered on CBC Gem on April 10, 2020, and was preceded with a two-part special in December 2019.

In April 2022, CBBC revealed that an eighth season was in production. The series moved to YTV in Canada, and the season premiered on September 26, 2022. On October 3, 2023, CBBC revealed there would a ninth season of The Next Step. In June 2024, The Cinemaholic reported that Family Channel had renewed The Next Step for its tenth season; despite the last two seasons not airing on the station. In November 2024, the BBC confirmed that the Next Step would return for a tenth and final season in 2025.

=== Filming ===
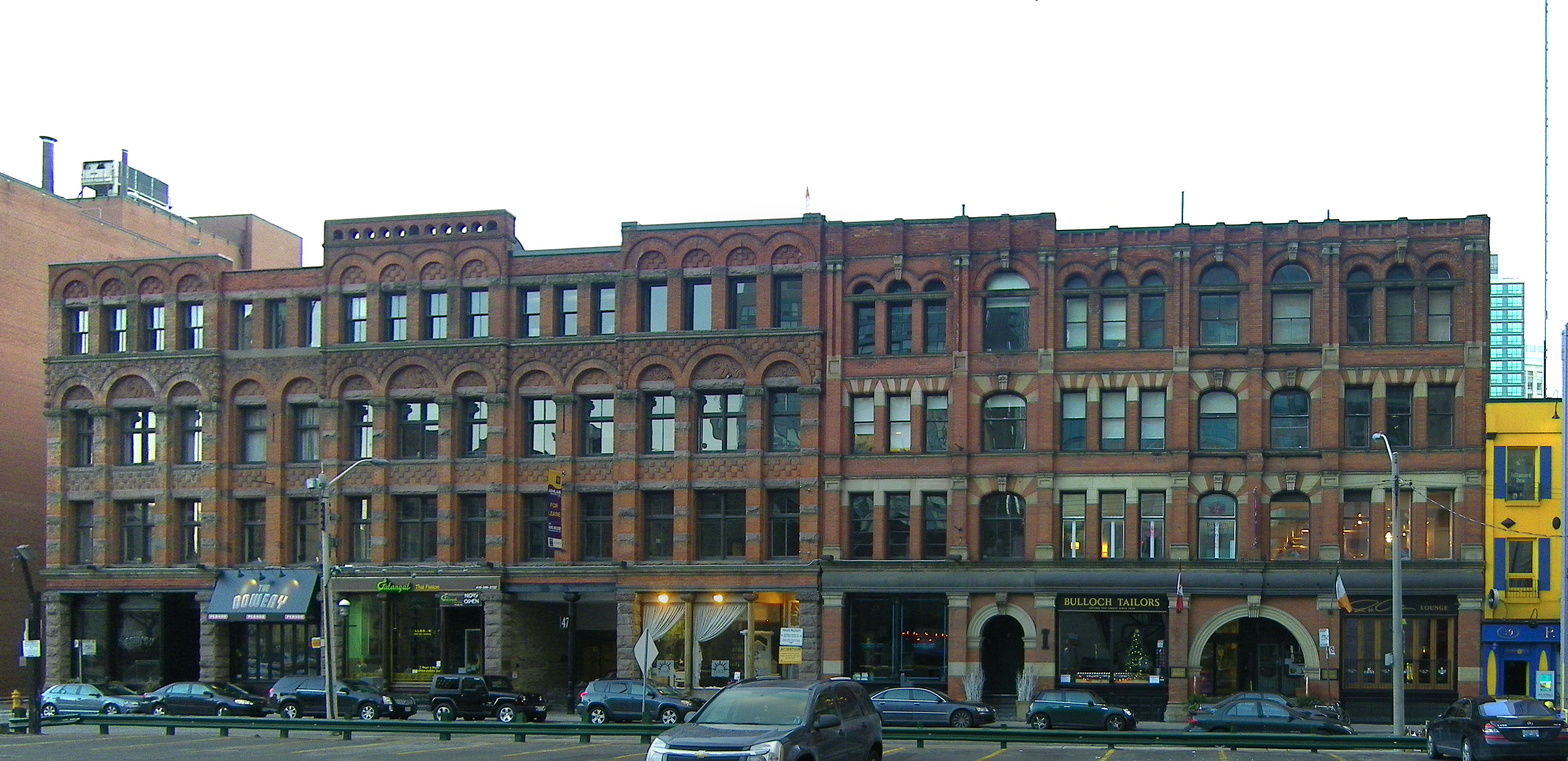
Colborne Street

Filming began on July 19, 2012, in Toronto, Ontario. The Next Step is filmed at Filmport Presentation Centre, Toronto.

Exterior and street shots were shot on location in Downtown Toronto. Locations include Dundas Street, Front Street, Jarvis Street, University Avenue, and Yonge Street. The exterior shots posing as The Next Step studio are from Colborne Street.

== Broadcast and distribution ==
The series aired from March 8, 2013, to April 7, 2019, on Family Channel in Canada, and from April 10, 2020, to September 18, 2020, on CBC Gem for the series' seventh season. The show also airs on TFO. The series premiere set rating records for Family, with at least 574,000 viewers on its initial broadcast—which set a record for Family's highest-rated original series premiere.

Outside of Canada, the series has aired on Universal Kids in the United States, and CBBC and BBC Three in the United Kingdom.

On January 8, 2014, BBC Worldwide licensed the series to several international broadcasters, including ABC Me in Australia, Hulu in the United States, and CBBC in the United Kingdom.

In August 2017, the U.S. rights to the series were sold to Universal Kids, with the network also becoming a production partner for the sixth season. Boat Rocker Media, owner of the show's producer, Radical Sheep Productions, cited a reduction in funding for the series from Family Channel parent company DHX Media as an impetus for the arrangement.

On June 30, 2025, it was first planned that the first 10 episodes of the tenth and final season would be released, and the final 10 episodes would be released in September 2025. However, on June 30, 2025, all 20 episodes were mistakenly released on ABC iview in Australia. The last 10 episodes were removed from the platform days later, however many people in Australia had already watched the ending and many clips were circulating across social media platforms, this caused outrage with some fans in other countries. On July 8, 2025, it was announced that the release date for the second half of Season 10 was moved up and all of the episodes would be released on CBBC and BBC iPlayer on July 12, 2025 during a marathon of this season.

== Reception ==
In July 2020, The Next Step was praised by viewers and the media for airing a same-sex kiss, when characters Cleo (Dani Verayo) and Jude (Molly Saunders) kissed after performing a duet together. This was the first same-sex kiss to be featured in the series, following a gay couple being briefly featured in an episode of the fourth season.

== Awards and nominations ==
Year	Award	Category	Recipient	Result	Ref.
2013	Shaw Rocket Prize	Children (ages 6-to-12)	The Next Step	Won	
2013	Digi Awards	Best in Cross-Platform Kids	The Next Step Interactive	Won	
2014	KidScreen Awards	Best Companion Website	The Next Step Interactive	Nominated	
2014	Canadian Cinema Editors Awards	Best Editing in 1/2 Hour Broadcast Short Form	Jay Prychidny	Won	
2014	Canadian Screen Awards	Best Children's or Youth Fiction Program or Series	The Next Step	Nominated	
2014	Canadian Screen Awards	Best Direction in a Children's or Youth Program or Series	Episode – "Sabotage"	Nominated	
2015	Canadian Screen Awards	Best Children's or Youth Fiction Program or Series	The Next Step	Nominated	
2015	Canadian Screen Awards	Best Writing in a Children's or Youth Program or Series	Alejandro Alcoba and Carling Tedesco	Nominated	
2015	Canadian Screen Awards	Best Performance in a Children's or Youth Program or Series	Brittany Raymond	Nominated	
2015	British Academy Children's Awards	Kids' Vote	Frank van Keeken	Won	
2016	British Academy Children's Awards	Kids' Vote	Frank van Keeken	Won	
2016	Young Artist Awards	Best Performance in a TV Series - Recurring Young Actor (14 - 21)	Myles Erlick	Nominated	
2017	Canadian Screen Awards	Best Performance in a Children's or Youth Program or Series	Brittany Raymond	Won	
2018	Canadian Screen Awards	Best Children's or Youth Fiction Program or Series	The Next Step	Nominated	
2018	Canadian Screen Awards	Best Performance, Children's or Youth	Akiel Julien	Nominated	
2018	Canadian Screen Awards	Best Writing, Children's or Youth	Rachael Schaefer	Nominated	
2018	Canadian Screen Awards	Best Direction, Children's or Youth	Derby Crewe	Nominated	
2019	Canadian Screen Awards	Best Children's or Youth Fiction Program or Series	The Next Step	Nominated	
2019	Canadian Screen Awards	Best Performance, Children's or Youth	Akiel Julien	Nominated	
2019	Canadian Screen Awards	Best Writing, Children's or Youth	Karen McClellan	Nominated	
2019	Canadian Screen Awards	Best Direction in a Children's or Youth Program or Series	Mitchell Ness	Nominated	
2021	British LGBT Awards	Media Moment	The Next Step	Nominated	

== Spin-offs ==
=== Lost & Found Music Studios ===
The Next Step set up a spin-off series in its third season, called Lost & Found Music Studios, which uses a similar mockumentary format, and which features some of the cast from The Next Step. The spinoff focuses on musicians and songwriters enrolled together in a special program at a music studio. The series debuted on Family Channel in Canada on December 11, 2015. and later was released on Netflix. The series consists of two seasons of 27 episodes.

=== Taking The Next Step ===
Taking the Next Step was a UK reality talent show on CBBC where young dancers auditioned for the chance to appear on the Canadian series The Next Step. Running for two seasons of 21 episodes between 2016 and 2017, it followed contestants through auditions, workshops, and live performances, with judges including professional dancers and sometimes cast members from The Next Step. The winners earned guest roles on the show, making it a unique spin-off that connected fans directly to the world of The Next Step.

=== The Next Step: Cheer ===
In July 2025, it was reported by Production Weekly that a spin-off, titled The Next Step: Cheer was in development. Instead of following the world of competitive dance, the spin-off is expected to focus on the world of competitive cheerleading with similar themes of teamwork, friendship, rivalry, and high-energy performances. Like The Next Step, it will be a scripted drama shot in a mockumentary-style format, blending character storylines with big performance numbers. Filming for this show began on August 12, 2025 and concluded on September 25, 2025. The series released on May 25, 2026, on CBBC in the UK, serving as the second spin-off in the franchise.

== Digital content ==
=== The Next Step Interactive ===
The aftershow started when an episode finished. It was approximately 1–3 minutes long, and was hosted by five members: Asha Bromfield, Lovell Adams-Gray, Luke Watters, Kelly McNamee, and Samantha "Sam" Munro. The aftershow talks about The Next Step and breaks down some parts to help the viewer understand storylines.

=== The Next Step: The Off Season ===
The Next Step: The Off Season (also titled The Next Step: Off Season) is a short series that depicts events that take place between the fourth and fifth seasons of The Next Step. The series was initially released exclusively on The Family Channel App, and was made be available on YouTube and the Family Channel website starting on May 19, 2017. The short series includes hints for the subsequent fifth season, as well as introducing new characters that are featured in season 5. A second season, titled The Next Step: The Scholarship, depicted events between the fifth and sixth seasons of the series, and introduced characters that would appear in season 6. A third season, titled The Next Step: Mini Episodes, presents events that take place between the sixth and seventh seasons. A fourth season, titled The Next Step: Get the Par-Tea Started, presents events that take place between the seventh and eight season, where an influencer stirs things up at The Next Step when she tries to unearth all the drama for her social media.

=== Website ===
The Next Step has a website with information about the characters, a schedule of episodes, a gallery of shots and videos from the show and a store, with The Next Step related clothing. It also includes a soundtrack for The Next Step.

== Tours ==
=== Hit The Floor Tour (2013) ===
The Next Step: Hit The Floor Tour
- Shopping Mall tour by The Next Step
- A promotional poster for the Conestoga Mall tour date
- Start date: October 19, 2013; 13 years ago
- End date: October 27, 2013; 13 years ago
- No. of shows: 9

In September 2013, Paul Cormack of Family Channel announced that The Next Step cast would go on a tour of Canada:

"We are always looking for new and exciting ways to connect with our audience on a national level. The Next Step Hit The Floor Tour reaches viewers in their own communities, providing a one-of-a-kind, interactive experience that demonstrates Family Channel's commitment to creating unique opportunities for its fans."

— Paul Cormack, Director of Marketing, Family Channel

The cast members that hosted the Hit the Floor Tour were Victoria Baldesarra, Lamar Johnson, Isaac Lupien, Jennifer Pappas, Brittany Raymond, and Trevor Tordjman. Each event consisted of the cast performing on stage in groups, and a Q&A session where the audience could ask questions and get "takeaways" for attending the event. The first 200 attendees were given a wristband, which would get them an autograph signed by the hosts.

Hit the Floor Tour dates and locations
Date	City	Country	Venue
October 19, 2013	Oshawa	Canada	Oshawa Centre
October 19, 2013	Toronto	Canada	Scarborough Town Centre
October 20, 2013	Richmond Hill	Canada	Hillcrest Mall
October 21, 2013	Waterloo	Canada	Conestoga Mall
October 22, 2013	Halifax	Canada	Mic Mac Mall
October 24, 2013	Winnipeg	Canada	Kildonan Place
October 25, 2013	Edmonton	Canada	Kingsway Mall
October 26, 2013	Calgary	Canada	The Core
October 27, 2013	Vancouver	Canada	Metrotown

Due to the attendance numbers at the previous six malls, Family Channel moved the event in the Kingsway Mall in Edmonton, Alberta from inside to the parking lot.

=== The Next Step: Live on Stage (2015) ===
The Next Step: Live on Stage was a cross-Canada tour that took place in the winter of 2015. It was the second tour for the show. The documentary film The Next Step Live: The Movie depicts the events of this tour. Castmembers on this tour were Victoria Baldesarra, Brittany Raymond, Trevor Tordjman, Jordan Clark, Lamar Johnson, Isaac Lupien, Jennifer Pappas, Logan Fabbro, Samantha Grecchi and Myles Erlick.

=== Wild Rhythm Tour (2016) ===
The cast of The Next Step put on a third tour in 2016. This was the first international tour by the cast, and was initially scheduled to hold performances in Canada, Spain, England and Ireland; subsequently show performances were added, including in Portugal, Italy, Australia, and New Zealand. The European and Australian legs of this tour are depicted in the documentary film The Next Step Live on Stage: Show the World.

The cast for the Wild Rhythm Tour were Victoria Baldesarra, Trevor Tordjman, Jordan Clark, Taveeta Szymanowicz, Isaac Lupien, Myles Erlick, and Briar Nolet, with newcomer Isaiah Peck, who was to star as Henry in season 4, also performing on the tour; Lamar Johnson was added to the tour cast later. Szymanowicz was only on the Canadian leg of the tour, while Brittany Raymond performed in some of the European shows but could not go to the shows in Australia and New Zealand because of a family issue.

Wild Rhythm Tour dates and locations
Date	City	Country	Venue
North America
February 3, 2016	London	Canada	Budweiser Gardens
February 4, 2016	Hamilton	Canada	FirstOntario Concert Hall
February 5, 2016	St. Catharines	Canada	Meridian Centre
February 6, 2016	Kitchener	Canada	Centre In The Square
February 7, 2016	Sudbury	Canada	Sudbury Community Arena
February 9, 2016	Thunder Bay	Canada	Thunder Bay Community Auditorium
February 11, 2016	Regina	Canada	Saskatchewan Centre of the Arts
February 12, 2016	Edmonton	Canada	Northern Alberta Jubilee Auditorium
February 13, 2016	Medicine Hat	Canada	Esplanade Arts and Heritage Centre
February 14, 2016	Kelowna	Canada	Kelowna Community Theatre
February 15, 2016	Vancouver	Canada	Queen Elizabeth Theatre
February 17, 2016	Calgary	Canada	Stampede Corral
February 18, 2016	Saskatoon	Canada	TCU Place
February 19, 2016	Winnipeg	Canada	Pantages Playhouse Theatre
February 21, 2016	Sault Ste. Marie	Canada	GFL Memorial Gardens
February 24, 2016	Montreal	Canada	Place des Arts
February 25, 2016	Kingston	Canada	Leon's Centre
February 26, 2016	Toronto	Canada	Sony Centre for the Performing Arts
February 27, 2016	Québec	Canada	Grand Théâtre de Québec
February 28, 2016	Moncton	Canada	Casino New Brunswick
February 29, 2016	Moncton	Canada	Casino New Brunswick
March 1, 2016	Halifax	Canada	Scotiabank Centre
March 3, 2016	St. John's	Canada	Mile One Centre
Europe
April 1, 2016	Madrid	Spain	Auditorio A. Recinto Ferial Juan Carlos I
April 2, 2016	Barcelona	Spain	L'Auditori
April 4, 2016	London	England	Lyric Theatre
April 5, 2016	London	England	New Wimbledon Theatre
April 6, 2016	Dublin	Ireland	Olympia Theatre
April 7, 2016	York	England	Barbican Centre
April 8, 2016	Newcastle	England	Newcastle City Hall
April 9, 2016	Birmingham	England	Birmingham Town Hall
April 10, 2016	Manchester	England	The Lowry
Oceania
September 18, 2016	Melbourne	Australia	Hamer Hall, Melbourne
September 20, 2016	Adelaide	Australia	Thebarton Theatre
September 22, 2016	Perth	Australia	Perth Concert Hall
September 24, 2016	Sydney	Australia	Big Top Sydney
September 26, 2016	Brisbane	Australia	Queensland Performing Arts Centre
September 28, 2016	Auckland	New Zealand	Aotea Centre
Europe
October 29, 2016	Bath	England	The Forum

=== The Next Step: Live on Stage (2017) ===
The cast of The Next Step went on tour in 2017 to Australia, New Zealand, United Kingdom and Dublin, Ireland.

The cast on this tour was similar to the Wild Rhythm Tour but with a few additions. The main cast included Victoria Baldesarra (Michelle), Jordan Clark (Giselle), Brittany Raymond (Riley), Myles Erlick (Noah), Briar Nolet (Richelle), Isaiah Peck (Henry) and Shelby Bain (Amy). For the Australian and New Zealand Leg, the show also included cast members Trevor Tordjman (James), Lamar Johnson (West) and Issac Lupien (Eldon). For the UK and Ireland leg, the shows also included Alexandra Chaves (Piper). In Australia and New Zealand the show was hosted by Disney presenters Adam Roberts and Ashleigh Wells (from Hanging with Adam & Ash). Trevor Tordjman was originally meant to perform on the UK leg of the tour but had to pull out due to the filming of Disney Channel's Zombies, and Isaiah Peck missed a couple of the UK shows.

The Next Step: Live on Stage (2017) dates and locations
Date	City	Country	Venue
Oceania
April 13, 2017	Newcastle	Australia	Newcastle Civic Theatre
April 15, 2017	Sydney	Australia	Big Top Sydney
April 16, 2017	Sydney	Australia	Big Top Sydney
April 18, 2017	Brisbane	Australia	QPAC
April 20, 2017	Canberra	Australia	Canberra Theatre Centre
April 22, 2017	Hobart	Australia	Derwent Entertainment Centre
April 23, 2017	Melbourne	Australia	Hamer Hall
April 26, 2017	Christchurch	New Zealand	Horncastle Arena
April 28, 2017	Wellington	New Zealand	St James Theatre
April 30, 2017	Auckland	New Zealand	Spark Arena
Europe
May 24, 2017	Dublin	Ireland	Olympia Theatre
May 26, 2017	Bristol	England	Colston Hall
May 27, 2017	Plymouth	England	Plymouth Pavilions
May 28, 2017	Ipswich	England	Regent Theatre
May 30, 2017	Bournemouth	England	Bournemouth International Centre
May 31, 2017	Newcastle	England	Newcastle City Hall
June 1, 2017	Edinburgh	Scotland	Usher Hall
June 2, 2017	Blackpool	England	Opera House
June 3, 2017	York	England	Barbican
June 4, 2017	Liverpool	England	Empire Theatre

=== Absolute Dance Tour (2019) ===
Nine of the season 6 cast toured Australia, Scotland, England, and Ireland, in September, October, and November 2019. The cast for the Absolute Dance Tour were Isaiah Peck, Shelby Bain, Alexandra Chaves, Berkeley Ratzlaff, Sage Linder, Dylan Ratzlaff, Liam Mackie, Noah Zulfikar, and Briar Nolet. Victoria Baldesarra joined for the Australia leg of the tour, with Myles Erlick joining on the UK leg. Alexandra Chaves missed the first few UK shows due to health issues, but rejoined in Manchester initially doing fewer dances before recovering completely towards the end of the tour.

Fans also had the chance to meet and greet the cast and have their photo taken with them. The meet and greet included watching them rehearse, a private question and answer session, a signed poster and a VIP meet and greet lanyard all before the show. They did two shows on some days, one in the morning and one in the afternoon, whereas on other days, they only did one.

Absolute Dance Tour dates and locations
Date	City	Country	Venue
Oceania
September 19, 2019	Newcastle	Australia	Newcastle Civic Theatre
September 21, 2019	Melbourne	Australia	Melbourne Convention Centre
September 22, 2019	Geelong	Australia	Geelong Performing Arts Centre
September 24, 2019	Brisbane	Australia	Fortitude Music Hall
September 25, 2019	Gold Coast	Australia	Home of the Arts
September 28, 2019	Wollongong	Australia	Wollongong Entertainment Centre
September 29, 2019	Canberra	Australia	Canberra Theatre Centre
October 1, 2019	Adelaide	Australia	Thebarton Theatre
October 3, 2019	Hobart	Australia	Wrest Point Hotel Casino
October 5, 2019	Sydney	Australia	Big Top Auditorium
October 8, 2019	Perth	Australia	Perth Superdrome
Europe
October 17, 2019	Glasgow	Scotland	SEC Armadillo
October 19, 2019	Manchester	England	O_{2} Apollo
October 20, 2019	Nottingham	England	Nottingham Royal Concert Hall
October 21, 2019	Leicester	England	De Montfort Hall
October 22, 2019	London	England	Hammersmith Apollo
October 24, 2019	Plymouth	England	Plymouth Pavilions
October 25, 2019	Brighton	England	Brighton Centre
October 26, 2019	Portsmouth	England	Portsmouth Guildhall
October 27, 2019	Bournemouth	England	Bournemouth International Centre
October 29, 2019	Newcastle	England	Newcastle City Hall
October 30, 2019	York	England	Barbican Centre
October 31, 2019	Bath	England	The Forum
November 2, 2019	Dublin	Ireland	Olympia Theatre

=== The Next Step Legacy - World Tour (2026) ===
The Next Step Legacy - World Tour is a world tour that take place in the U.S., U.K., Ireland, Australia, Canada, and France that began on February 13, 2026, and concluded on April 19, 2026. It features several returning cast members. The lineup includes Alexandra Chaves as Piper, Ben Williams as Pete, Briar Nolet as Richelle, Carter Musselman as Heath, Emmerly Tinglin as Kenzie, Isaac Lupien as Eldon, Jordan Clark as Giselle, Noah Zulfikar as Kingston, Shane Mahabir as Ethan, Trevor Tordjman as James, and Victoria Baldesarra as Michelle.
