= List of You Can't Do That on Television episodes =

This is a list of episodes of You Can't Do That on Television, a Canadian live-action variety sketch show that offers a subversive spin on specific topics as filtered through the lives of pre-teens and teenagers. The show was in production from 1979 to 1990. No episodes were produced in 1980 and 1988.

== Episode list ==
=== Season 1 (1979) ===
These were hour-long episodes aired locally on Saturday mornings on CJOH-TV in Ottawa, Ontario, Canada and were a mixture of prerecorded comedy sketches and mostly live link scenes, along with phone-in contests, music videos, disco dancing contests, and interviews. These early episodes also sported great prize giveaways like a portable television set, a Panasonic radio, and vinyl albums. Until March 2013, only three episodes from this season were known to exist in their entirety. In March 2013, information and photos from the "missing" episodes were provided to www.ycdtotv.com, and in June 2013, the episodes themselves were uploaded to YouTube. They have since been removed.

No.	Subject	Air Date	Cast	Notes
1	Live!	February 3, 1979	Tim Douglas, Jim Johnson, Les Lye, Christine McGlade, Mike Patton, Lisa Ruddy, Kevin Schenk, Kevin Somers	Repeated on March 24 when the pilot for Whatever Turns You On was being made. In the show's premiere episode, the kids explain and demonstrate how the show will be different from anything else seen on Canadian television before, including the CTV network series Kidstuff, which would be a frequent target for YCDTOTV during its first season (though it was only running in reruns by then). Contains the very first green slime scene. This episode was delayed one week because the link set was not ready. The only known copy of this episode cuts off abruptly during the final link, presumably less than a minute from the program's actual end. Tim Douglas, the victim of the show's first green sliming as well as a pie in the face, is established in this episode as the first season's premier object of ridicule. First episode for Tim Douglas, Jim Johnson, Les Lye, Christine McGlade, Mike Patton, Lisa Ruddy, Kevin Schenk and Kevin Somers.
2	A CJOH Shoestring Production (no official title)	February 10, 1979	Marc Baillon, Tim Douglas, David Halpin, Rodney Helal, Jim Johnson, Cyndi Kennedy, Les Lye, Christine McGlade, Jim Stechyson	First episode for Marc Baillon, the show's token Francophone kid. As such, it features a number of jokes skewering the double meaning of the word "frog" (as both the name of an amphibian and as a racist slur against French speakers). Tim tries to get a date with Cyndi, and not only fails but is further humiliated by being made to wear a pink evening gown. Elizabeth Mitchell was initially the host in this episode, but in the middle of taping, she developed laryngitis, and they gave most of her lines to Christine, who never relinquished hosting duties until she left the show in 1986. Thus, Liz's only speaking role in this episode is during the locker jokes. This episode also features the first opposite skit, contributed by a viewer in Quebec. During one of the disco dances, a crawl ran across the bottom of the screen that read: "You Can't Do That On Television" and the word television was misspelled. Music videos shown in this episode include Donna Summer's "Last Dance", Andy Gibb's "(Love Is) Thicker Than Water," and Billy Joel's "Say Goodbye to Hollywood."
3	Nickel and Dime	February 17, 1979	Jonothan Gebert, Brad Hampson, Ramona Helal, Jim Johnson, Les Lye, Deidre McIsaac, Mike Patton, Kevin Somers, Sarah West	The first episode to feature water. Musical Performances include Tina Charles - "Hold Me", Kiss - "Love 'Em and Leave 'Em", and Kenny Loggins - "Easy Driver". The lockers for the locker joke sketches were not yet painted in the familiar YCDTOTV colours, but were still the original dark green colour. The only credited episode for Ramona Helal (Rodney's older sister), though she was featured as an extra in some other episodes.
4	Peanuts	February 24, 1979	Todd Brewer, Iain Fingler, Jonothan Gebert, Jim Johnson, Cyndi Kennedy, Les Lye, Robin Marpack, Christine McGlade, Kevin Schenk, Gordon Smith	Christine is credited as "Christine-Moose-McGlade" during the closing credits, thus beginning her long running nickname.
5	Repeat	March 3, 1979	Tim Douglas, Jim Johnson, Les Lye, Christine McGlade, Elizabeth Mitchell, Mike Patton, Kevin Schenk, Sarah West, Bradfield Wiltse	First episode with painted lockers. Features two impromptu moments when Les is shoved into the pool by the kids at the swim race, and when Elizabeth receives her pie in the face, "for showing the most courage...and the least ability".
6	Ottawa Director	March 10, 1979	Jonothan Gebert, Rodney Helal, Jim Johnson, Les Lye, Christine McGlade, Elizabeth Mitchell, Kevin Schenk, Kevin Somers	Features the "Crazy" closing credits: "and thanks to all the Ottawa names not mentioned - it wasn't R. SOLE, we had technical problems". Christine reads the closing voice-over.
7	St. Patrick's Day	March 17, 1979	David Halpin, Jim Johnson, Cyndi Kennedy, Les Lye, Lisa Ruddy, Jim Stechyson, Bradfield Wiltse, Sarah West	Usually referred to by fans as the "Green Slime" show. "I Don't Know" triggers green slime for the first time, and the plot revolves around Lisa constantly getting tricked into saying the magic words. This episode was the first to include each member of the cast getting slimed, and also holds the record for the most slime in a single episode (with Lisa getting it 6 times). Sarah West appears only during the announcement of a phone-in competition in which the winner gets a dinner date with her (a redo of an earlier attempt which failed when the caller hung up before claiming the prize).
8	Backstage	March 31, 1979	Marc Baillon, Jonothan Gebert, Rodney Helal, Jim Johnson, Les Lye, Christine McGlade, Elizabeth Mitchell, Kevin Schenk, Kevin Somers	Locked out of the studio during the taping of "the network show," Christine is forced to host from backstage. Cameos by producers Roger Price & Bryn Matthews' daughter and son, respectively, who are both tricked into getting slimed and pied by Christine. Some segments from "the network show" (Whatever Turns You On) are played, and Christine interviews Ruth Buzzi. Hodgkins (the skeleton in the dungeon sketches) gets his name in this episode.
9	A Staff Privvy/Executive Washrooms Production (no official title)	April 7, 1979	Ian Fingler, Les Lye, Christine McGlade, Mike Patton, Jim Stechyson, Sarah West, Jim Johnson	The "network people" leave the link set in a shambles after a party, Mr. Dime finds himself in a bathroom without toilet paper after having eaten several bran muffins, and Christine and Sarah plot to pie and slime Mike while Jim and Mike plot to pie and slime Sarah, with all using poor Ian as the "guinea pig" for their plans. Sarah and Mike do eventually end up slimed, but not in the way anyone expected. This episode was inspired by when the locks at CJOH were randomly changed at one point. The scenes about Mr. Dime using money as toilet paper caused some level of controversy, with employees of CJOH-TV and parents who saw the show. Cartoonist Jim Unger appears to announce a contest related to one of his drawings.
10	Boring	April 14, 1979	Tim Douglas, Jim Johnson, Cyndi Kennedy, Les Lye, Deidre McIsaac, Lisa Ruddy, Kevin Somers	Tim faces various mishaps in the library, while Kevin tries once again to score a date with Cyndi. Deidre appears only in the library sketches as "Ms. McIsaac," the assistant librarian. The phone connection is lost during a contest segment and Les ad-libs fixing it (as Ross). This was the first episode in which shaving cream, rather than actual pies, was used for pie scenes. During the group pie scene at the end of the episode, Cyndi forgot to keep her mouth closed when she was hit, ended up swallowing a mouthful of shaving cream, and went home sick.
11	Straitjackets	April 21, 1979	Marc Baillon, Brad Hampson, Rodney Helal, Jim Johnson, Les Lye, Robin Marpack, Sarah West	The entire cast are made to wear straitjackets for safety reasons. An on-screen title reads: "Sorry girls... but Kevin Somers will be on next week.", the first of the shows long running gag of "crazy credits".
12	Local Show	April 28, 1979	Jonothan Gebert, Jim Johnson, Les Lye, Christine McGlade, Elizabeth Mitchell, Kevin Schenk, Kevin Somers	Christine shows outtakes from the filming of the Whatever Turns You On pilot, including footage of Elizabeth Mitchell being pied and Whatever Turns You On guest star Ruth Buzzi being pied and slimed during this episode. This episode was broadcast an hour later than usual, at 11:30 a.m., due to the airing of the Whatever Turns You On pilot in the usual YCDTOTV time slot; however, the cast did hold a phone-in competition for local viewers during a commercial break in the WTYO pilot. The cast make a big production of the week's Kidstuff rerun (which would normally have aired at 11:30) being pre-empted for this episode of YCDTOTV.
13	Sore Foot	May 5, 1979	Jonothan Gebert, Jim Johnson, Les Lye, Christine McGlade, Elizabeth Mitchell, Kevin Schenk, Kevin Somers, Sarah West	The link segments were broadcast live from checkpoint 4 of the Meters for Millions walk. This is the only episode of the season with no slime, water or pie scenes.
14	End of the Line	May 19, 1979	Marc Baillon, Jim Johnson, Les Lye, Christine McGlade, Elizabeth Mitchell, Kevin Schenk, Kevin Somers, Sarah West	On bootleg copies, there's footage from after the credits where Bryn Matthews (then president of CJOH and longtime executive producer of the series) is pied, and Roger Price himself is slimed for not knowing if the show will be back next year. Christine also shows footage of production assistant Jani Barry getting pied by surprise. This is the first episode in which cast members dumped slime on each other: Kevin Somers is slimed by Les (as Ross), and Christine and Kevin Somers are slimed by Elizabeth (marking the first time Christine was ever slimed). Meanwhile, the winners of the disco dance contest receive their prizes: color television sets, making Christine jealous. Music videos shown were: "Old School Yard" by Cat Stevens, "Whenever I Call You 'Friend'" by Kenny Loggins, and "I Love to Love" by Tina Charles.

=== Season 2 (1981, Canada); 1982 (United States) ===
This season originally had the same format as the 1979 episodes (except that the disco dancing segments were replaced with video game contests). However, beginning with this season, each episode had a specific theme along with a "preempted show" intro. In addition, half-hour versions were made for national and international syndication. The "international" versions of these episodes composed the first season of the series to air on Nickelodeon, although slightly different versions were made to be shown in Canada. Many scenes (including slime, water and pie scenes) were also reshot for the syndicated versions to remove local Ottawa or specifically Canadian references; the reshot scenes are often easy to spot because the kids often sported longer hair. This seasons' first seven episodes were released on iTunes on December 17, 2012. At the end of the Smoking episode, McGlade gave a special acknowledgement to Lye, who never smoked in real life, for doing so much smoking during the episode. He greatly appreciated the acknowledgement, and also said he'd never smoke again. (He would be forced to, however, in filming the 1989 "Smoking" episode.)

In addition to airing on Nickelodeon, the half-hour edits of this season's episodes were also broadcast locally on CJOH starting in January 1982. To make up for the lack of local content, the show's cast and crew made a new, local-only program, Something Else, to preserve the variety-show and local-interest segments that had been part of the original YCDTOTV. Something Else aired Saturday mornings on CJOH immediately following the YCDTOTV reruns. Christine also sported her natural hair (cut short and dyed with pink highlights), rather than the wigs she'd be forced to wear during the 1982 season of YCDTOTV.

No.	Subject	CJOH Air Date	Nickelodeon Air Date	Cast	Notes
15	Work	January 24, 1981	January 2, 1982	Christine McGlade, Lisa Ruddy, Darryl Lucas, Jonothan Gebert, Kevin Schenk, Les Lye	(Preempted Show: The Muppets Get Stuffed) Christine spends the show shoveling dirt on the link set to please her father, who does not feel working on the show constitutes a "real job." Christine's real-life dad makes a cameo appearance at show's end. Longtime stage hand Scott Webb was quoted as saying this episode featured their grossest batch of slime, causing many in the studio audience to gag due to the foul smell. To make matters worse, Christine had to film the slime scene twice, due to discrepancies between the Canadian broadcast and the US syndication version.
16	Transportation	January 31, 1981	January 6, 1982	Randi Akiwenzie, Les Lye, Christine McGlade, Brodie Osome, Kevin Schenk, Kevin Somers	(The Dukes Of Hazard Line Up For Gas) Christine tries to illustrate various methods of getting from place to place, but Ross continually says certain words that put her in unfortunate situations (including being drenched, slimed, stuffed into a garbage can, shot with a cannon, and finally mummified). Despite the editing made to make this hour-long, local episode into a 28-minute Nickelodeon episode, this episode still has several references that would make sense if the episode was local—the most notable of these references being the shot where Christine falls without a parachute. The background was put in with special effects and one of the locations she falls past is Parliament Hill, which, of course, is where the parliament buildings are in Ottawa, Ontario, Canada.
17	Strike Now	February 7, 1981	January 13, 1982	Christine McGlade, Les Lye, Jami Burning, Rodney Helal, Kevin Schenk, Kevin Kubusheskie	(Captain Kangaroo Robs A Bank) Disgusted at being paid the same as the 10-year-olds (although she's no taller than the 10-year-olds), Christine strikes for more pay. When she's finally granted her raise, she learns that her take-home pay will be less than before due to taxes. The first episode to use split screen. The live and local version of this episode exists and features the only time Christine was slimed in the dungeon, as well as a scene in which Kevin Kubusheskie spoils an audience participation segment by inadvertently giving out the answer to a contest question.
18	Dating	February 14, 1981	January 20, 1982	Angie Coddett, Jonothan Gebert, Les, Lye, Christine McGlade, Lisa Ruddy, Kevin Schenk, Steve Wilson	(JAWS Eats The Love Boat) Christine spends the entire show on the link set waiting in vain for her boyfriend to call; meanwhile, everyone calls but her boyfriend. In the original 1981 broadcast and Nickelodeon's 28-min version, Christine gets a call from a weather man to tell her the weather forecast, which is mainly cloudy with a few wet periods. When she repeats that, the word "wet" causes her to get drenched. Features a cameo by Christine's real-life boyfriend at that time.
19	Fitness	February 21, 1981	January 27, 1982	Christine McGlade, Mike Lyon, Rodney Helal, Tanya King, Les Lye, Jonothan Gebert, Darryl Lucas, Pepi (uncredited), Kevin Schenk (uncredited)	(The Six Million Dollar Man Rusts to Bits) This was the first episode Martin Kerr appeared on, yet he was not even in any of the sketches and his part did not even make it to the Nickelodeon version at all. According to Geoffrey Darby, Martin was at the location they sent the roving camera to the previous week and he told a joke. Roger liked him, and on the show he had Christine show the clip and ask if anyone knows who he was. If someone did, Christine urged them to call in. Martin's friends soon called in and he was made an official member of the cast in the Nutrition episode.
20	Safety First	February 28, 1981	February 3, 1982	Angie Coddett, Les Lye, Christine McGlade, Scott Sandeman, Kevin Schenk, Kevin Somers, Michelle Taylor	(Hit and Run on Sesame Street) Christine attempts to explain how certain, everyday things can become dangerous when used incorrectly. Before the show is over, poor Christine is cut in half, loses her head (literally), gets shocked, has whitewash and water dumped on her, and gets 16 tons dropped on her head. In one sketch, Barth says "Damn" twice very clearly. This scene was cut out when Nickelodeon edited episodes from 1984 on, but survived the CJOH censors, the CTV censors and Roger and Geoff's original editing for Nick. This was also the first episode to feature a slime colour other than green: white. White slime would be reused in episodes such as "Media" (1983) and "Time" (1989).
21	Sexual Equality	March 7, 1981	February 10, 1982	Rodney Helal, Les Lye, Kevin Kubusheskie, Christine McGlade, Brodie Osome, Lisa Ruddy	(The Dukes Of Hazard Dress Up In Drag) As Moose is doing the intro, Lisa, Kevin, Brodie and Rodney claim that her job is too easy and they want a chance to host. They each find out the hard way what it is like to host, each getting pied, slimed, and/or watered. Meanwhile, Moose realizes that things are still not fair, as Brodie can say "I don't Know" all he wants without getting the green stuff dumped on him, yet she gets slimed multiple times throughout the episode. The hour-long local version of this episode exists, and a number of the stage pollution scenes (including Rodney's and Lisa's pie scenes, as well as Christine's and Brodie's slime scenes) were reshot for the syndicated/Nickelodeon version, largely to remove local references. This was the last episode to use the original slime recipe, which included rotten leftovers from the studio's cafeteria.
22	Personal Hygiene	March 14, 1981	February 17, 1982	Randi Akiwenzie, Angie Coddett, Jonothan Gebert, Les Lye, Darryl Lucas, Christine McGlade, Kevin Schenk, and Kevin Kubusheskie (uncredited)	(Jaws Eats Jaques Cousteau) Christine illustrates how to keep clean by hosting the show from her bathtub (with suds covering her body). According to director Geoffrey Darby, this episode caused the show to get into some hot water with CJOH concerning a sketch where Angie comes into the bathroom and decides that if Moose can host the show from the bathroom, then she can use the toilet, as Moose tells the cameras to cut away. The 28-minute version was shortened to show less of Angie, and the 24-minute version cuts the scene altogether.
23	Smoking	March 21, 1981	February 24, 1982	Jami Burning, Kevin Kubusheskie, Les Lye, Christine McGlade, Lisa Ruddy, Kevin Schenk	(Atomic Blast Levels Fantasy Island) This episode was inspired by those who opposed Geoff Darby and Roger Price when they tried to ban smoking in the studio. This was one of the few topics to be featured twice during the run of the show. After Jami admits that the Indians' sole intention of inventing Smoking was to kill the white men, he tries to get Moose to smoke and also tries to scalp her. And, Les steps out of character to give an anti-smoking message. This episode had two Locker Jokes segments.
24	Crime and Vandalism	March 28, 1981	March 3, 1982	Jonothan Gebert, Rodney Helal, Les Lye, Christine McGlade, Brodie Osome, Kevin Schenk	(Mr. Rogers [sic] Vandalizes the Neighborhood) Throughout the show, everything in the studio gets stolen. Geoffrey Darby recalled that one of his favorite gags in the entire series was Christine and Ross wearing barrels. A scene was redone when Christine's soapbox was stolen so that a newscaster could use it. In the original Canadian version, the newscaster was CJOH's longtime lead anchor, Max Keeping. In the Nickelodeon version, it was changed to Dan Rather.
25	Drugs	April 4, 1981	March 10, 1982	Angie Coddett, Les Lye, Mike Lyon, Christine McGlade, Kevin Schenk, Kevin Somers	(Mr. Rogers Neighborhood Pusher) Kevin, Mike and Angie spend the show trying to get Christine to "splat" pies, which are an obvious substitute for drugs, and pie themselves throughout the show. In the closing scene, Angie, Kevin and Mike pay Christine back for not being pied during the show, smashing pies in her face throughout the credits. The "production" shot (Mike getting pied under the voice over saying "this has been a pie in the face production") was a live, on air surprise.
26	Nutrition	April 11, 1981	March 17, 1982	Les Lye, Darryl Lucas, Martin Kerr, Kevin Kubusheskie, Christine McGlade, Lisa Ruddy, Scott Sandeman	(Miss Piggy Eats Ham Sandwiches) Moose introduces the viewers to some good, healthy foods and also explains the benefits of eating them, but she ends up wearing most of them instead (water, milk, eggs, and porridge). During production, Lisa showed up late for a read-through because she had a detention for talking during class. Roger and Geoff then decided to rewrite the script, including new scenes that show Lisa annoying everyone by talking too much, as well as adding in her sliming (with porridge, not with green slime) as punishment. Little did they expect that the long-running joke of Lisa talking would continue until she left the show in 1985.
27	Peer Pressure	April 18, 1981	March 24, 1982	Jonothan Gebert, Rodney Helal, Les Lye, Christine McGlade, Lisa Ruddy, Kevin Schenk	(60 Minutes is preempted because the clock broke and the other networks made them do it) Peer pressure is illustrated by Rodney and Lisa pressuring Kevin to moon the camera. The episode also contains a running gag in which "peer" is confused with "pier" and with British Peers. This was the only episode of the series not feature Les Lye's Ross character. The clip of Billy Joel in this episode is borrowed from a Saturday Night Live episode. The half-hour CJOH cut of this episode still exists.

=== Season 3 (1982) ===
This is the first season in which each episode was made in the half-hour format and produced specifically for Nickelodeon. With many of the regulars from the 1981 season having grown too old for the show, this season saw the additions of several new cast members, including Alasdair Gillis, Vanessa Lindores, Elizabeth Richardson and Doug Ptolemy, and Abby Hagyard as the series' token adult female to play opposite Les Lye. Also, host Christine McGlade wore wigs throughout the season in order to hide her natural hair, which had been cut short and dyed with pink highlights. CTV would also give the show a second try on the network in the fall of 1982, airing once a week on Saturday mornings.

No.	Subject	Air Date	Cast	Notes
28	Cosmetics	October 18, 1982	Abby Hagyard, Les Lye, Christine McGlade, Brodie Osome, Lisa Ruddy, Elizabeth Richardson, Kevin Kubusheskie	(The Incredible Hulk Runs Out of Deodorant) Christine obtains a box of assorted cosmetics and explains the benefits - and drawbacks - of using them. The first episode to show the detention room set. The only episode to feature Brown Slime. Christine's real life little sister, Lisa, makes a cameo, playing the younger version of her. Her brother also makes a cameo. Les Lye had suggested adding Lisa McGlade to the cast once Christine got too old for the show, but Roger Price nixed the suggestion, although she would appear on and off as an uncredited extra for several seasons.
29	Addictions	October 20, 1982	Abby Hagyard, Martin Kerr, Kevin Kubusheskie, Les Lye, Christine McGlade, Luke McKeehan, Lisa Ruddy	(Pac-Man Eats General Hospital) Christine is addicted to video games (Pac-Man for the Atari 2600), and Lisa is addicted to soap operas (General Hospital in particular). A scene is cut from the original airing episode where Kevin is sent to detention for eating beans and breaks wind in the room. As with the 1983 Nature episode, which also had a similar breaking wind scene, the fart joke would become more common in the later years.
30	Popularity	October 22, 1982	Eugene Contreras, Abby Hagyard, Kevin Kubusheskie, Les Lye, Christine McGlade, Elizabeth Richardson, Lisa Ruddy	(The Most Popular Children's Show on TV) A contest is held to determine which of the kids on the show is the most popular. Christine comes up with what seems like a surefire way to win, which backfires on her.
31	Fads and Fashion	October 25, 1982	Kevin Kubusheskie, Les Lye, Darryl Lucas, Christine McGlade, Doug Ptolemy, Lisa Ruddy	(Fred Sanford: The World's Best Dressed Man) Kevin, Lisa and Doug model the latest fashions (which change with every link), and Christine tries in vain to keep up. Doug's first credited appearance. When Christine is squirted with whipped cream, she's wearing her natural hair wig instead of the curly wig usually used this season for stage pollution scenes.
32	Vacations	October 27, 1982	Alasdair Gillis, Martin Kerr, Kevin Kubusheskie, Darryl Lucas, Les Lye, Brodie Osome (uncredited), Christine McGlade, Klea Scott	(Love Boat Runs Aground On Fantasy Island) Christine goes on vacation only to discover that the cast and crew have followed her to tape another episode. Alasdair Gillis' first credited appearance. It's also the only episode of the entire season with no green slime.
33	Rip-Offs	October 29, 1982	Angie Coddett, Alasdair Gillis, Abby Hagyard, Les Lye, Jamie Martin, Christine McGlade, Lisa Ruddy	(The Price Is Right Raise Their Prices) The warranty of every piece of equipment in the studio is about to expire, causing chaos. Lisa is the victim of the most massive sliming in the series history, as the entire bucket is dumped on her at once; for some reason, that sketch was cut from airings of the episode from 1983 onward after Nickelodeon became advertiser-supported. However, it would later appear in the slime montage in The Worst of You Can't Do That on Television.
34	Bullying	November 1, 1982	Alasdair Gillis, Kevin Kubusheskie, Les Lye, Darryl Lucas, Christine McGlade, Brodie Osome, Lisa Ruddy	(Mr. Rogers Bullies The Neighborhood) Christine studies martial arts to protect herself from bullies, while Alasdair bullies Kevin mercilessly. Jamie Martin makes an uncredited appearance as a sniveling kid with a black eye following the closing credits.
35	Culture Junk	November 3, 1982	Abby Hagyard, Martin Kerr, Kevin Kubusheskie, Les Lye, Christine McGlade, Brodie Osome, Klea Scott, Lisa Ruddy	(Big Bird Dances Swan Lake) The gang look at literature, plays, fine music, and other forms of culture. In the last water scene, there is a fake fish in the bucket. It drops on Moose in the gush of water. The opening scene, in which Christine is seated at a bar making a mixed drink (when she was supposed to be at a ballet barre), was cut from post-1983 Nickelodeon airings, although a still from the scene remains during the closing credits.
36	Television	November 5, 1982	Roddy Contreras, Abby Hagyard, Kevin Kubusheskie, Vanessa Lindores, Les Lye, Christine McGlade, Doug Ptolemy, Lisa Ruddy	(YCDTOTV cannot be shown at this time so that we may rant about television) In the show's most famous episode, Christine takes the viewing audience behind the scenes, showing them what really goes on at a real television program and defines the technical terms that are heard in television studios...like "soak the star." The infamous multi-coloured slime scene from this episode was prominently used in Nickelodeon bumpers throughout the years, and was also featured in the movie Fatal Attraction. Vanessa would recall that she was paid the slime bonus for this scene due to being nailed by splash-off from Christine's multiple slimings, despite the fact that Vanessa wasn't technically the one being slimed (and thus didn't look up as slime victims were instructed to do); however, Vanessa would indeed be slimed herself in another link (although she still didn't look up). One of the rare shows to use multiple slime recipes. A lighter texture of slime was used on Christine, in order to maintain her wig, while a thicker sloppier consistency was dumped on poor Vanessa (her first credited appearance) Features a blooper in the scene where Kevin and Lisa are listening to themselves moan, Lisa cracks a smile and breaks character, before looking down to regain her composure.
37	Sports	November 8, 1982	Abby Hagyard, Kevin Kubusheskie, Tony Lefebvre, Simone Lumsden, Les Lye, Christine McGlade, Brodie Osome, Lisa Ruddy	(Howard Cosell Loses His Voice) Christine plays sportscaster and does her best (or worst) Howard Cosell impersonation. This was one of the only topics to be featured twice during the show's run (the other being "Smoking"). Simone Lumsden is one of only two cast members to never appear on the link set; the other was Jordan Arron in 1989.
38	Heroes	November 10, 1982	Charlie Brien, Abby Hagyard, Kevin Kubusheskie, Les Lye, Christine McGlade, Doug Ptolemy, Lisa Ruddy	(Conan the Librarian) The gang takes a look at all of their favorite superheroes, and Lisa puts a new spin on Wonder Woman. Features a behind the scenes blooper that stayed in the final broadcast, where Moose does a series of things, including sticking her tongue out, while Lisa attempts to introduce her link.
39	The Not-So-Fair-Show	November 12, 1982	Alasdair Gillis, Abby Hagyard, Les Lye, Forest Wolf Mohawk, Christine McGlade, Natalie Radmore, Lisa Ruddy, Klea Scot, and Doug Ptomely (both uncredited)	(Real People) The gang looks at what's fair and unfair in life for kids. The famous slime scene at the end where Christine gets to slime the rest of the cast was cut mid-stream in the YTV broadcast due to length. The only episode for Natalie and Forest, making them among the unfortunate "one-episode wonders" to be slimed in their only episode.
40	Growing Up	November 15, 1982	Abby Hagyard, Kevin Kubusheskie, Vanessa Lindores, Darryl Lucas, Christine McGlade, Doug Ptolemy, Les Lye, Lisa Ruddy, Martin Ker, and Alasdair Gillis (uncredited)	(My Three Sons of Frankenstein) A look at all the fears and worries that go along with growing up. In the opening scene, Kevin and Doug sport 1982-era Nickelodeon T-shirts with the brand new "Pinball" logo.

=== Season 4 (1983-1984) ===
1983 marked the last season for regulars Brodie Osome and Martin Kerr, but the show welcomed newcomer Justin Cammy. With video-game arcades rising in popularity, Blip's Arkaid was added to the roster of skits this season. In late 1983, the original 28 minute episodes were cut by 3 minutes when Nickelodeon started allowing outside advertising. The first ten 1983 episodes were the last episodes to be shown in the 28 minute format.

No.	Subject	Air Date	Cast	Notes
41	Media	October 3, 1983	Alasdair Gillis, Abby Hagyard, Kevin Kubusheskie, Les Lye, Christine McGlade, Elizabeth Richardson, Lisa Ruddy	(You Can't Do That On Television) The show targets television and newspaper medias, mainly for their deceptiveness in advertising. Living the example, the show calls itself "new and improved" but admits having little to show for it. Last episode to contain a fake commercial (other than TV Commercials, 1987). This is the second time YCDTOTV itself gets preempted
42	Pets	October 5, 1983	Eugene Contreras, Abby Hagyard, Martin Kerr, Les Lye, Vanessa Lindores, Christine McGlade, Lisa Ruddy	(Kermit The Frog Tries To Cross The Highway) The kids explain the proper way to care for pets, and Lisa repeatedly makes jokes referring to Christine as a dog. Christine finally gets revenge by tricking Lisa into getting slimed at the end of the show. This is Martin Kerr's final appearance.
43	Medicine	October 7, 1983	Alasdair Gillis, Abby Hagyard, Kevin Kubusheskie, Les Lye, Christine McGlade, Luke McKeehan, Lisa Ruddy	(General Hospital gets busted to Private Room) Christine breaks her leg and has to host the entire show in a cast. Christine's slime scene for this episode was re-shot for use in Nickelodeon's inaugural Slime-In sweepstakes.
44	Rules & Regulations	October 10, 1983	Abby Hagyard, Les Lye, Brodie Osome, Doug Ptolemy, Lisa Ruddy, Natalie Salat, Christine McGlade	(Mr. Rogers' Neighborhood) The government, having discovered kids working for You Can't Do That on Television, impose new rules and regulations to protect them. First rule: since money corrupts, the kids cannot be paid. This is the first and final appearance of Natalie Salat. In the Locker segment, Christine tells Natalie her desire to make the wearing of seat belts compulsory. Since this show's initial air date, the wearing seat belts has become mandatory - for decades, in fact - making Christine's joke seem very sorely dated.
45	Future World	October 12, 1983	Abby Hagyard, Mike Hora, Kevin Kubusheskie, Les Lye, Christine McGlade, Doug Ptolemy, Lisa Ruddy	(Life On Earth) Christine tries her hand at various ways of predicting the future, including crystal balls and tarot cards. One of the few episodes to use multiple slime recipes; Christine's first sliming is lumpier than usual, where-as her second one is more akin with the recipe used throughout the rest of the season.
46	Nature	October 14, 1983	Alasdair Gillis, Abby Hagyard, Kevin Kubusheskie, Vanessa Lindores, Les Lye, Christine McGlade, Lisa Ruddy	(The Waltons Move to Mt. St. Helens) Nickelodeon cut the final seconds of the "Mandatory Can of Beans" sketch where Lance breaks wind and a sound effect is heard. Ironically, during the show's later seasons, fart jokes were encouraged by the network. Kevin is slimed while outdoors.
47	Cooking	October 17, 1983	Corey Fraser, Alasdair Gillis, Abby Hagyard, Vanessa Lindores, Les Lye, Christine McGlade, Lisa Ruddy	(The Pillsbury Doughboy Serves Six) Moose tries her hand at various recipes, but none of them turn out right. At the end of the show, the cast force her to eat a nasty-looking substance that looks suspiciously like green slime. Lisa is the first cast member to be slimed at the dinner table, one of the few areas assumed to be "safe."
48	Inequality: Kids vs. Adults	October 19, 1983	Eugene Contreras, Abby Hagyard, Les Lye, Christine McGlade, Brodie Osome, Elizabeth Richardson, Jennifer White	(There is no pre-empted show. However, there is a disclaimer that reads: "The following program contains certain scenes which may not be suitable for mature audiences; Juvenile discretion is advised.") The kids cry "age discrimination" over all instances and situations that run contrary to meeting their desires. The only episode of the show not to feature a pre-empt. Liz Richardson's last episode, and Jennifer White's only episode.
49	Rumors	October 21, 1983	Abby Hagyard, Kevin Kubusheskie, Les Lye, Luke McKeehan, Christine McGlade, Klea Scott, Lisa Ruddy	(Miss Piggy Sues the National Enquirer) Rumors circulate about Christine being fired from the show, and when she is able to say "water" without being drenched (while Lisa is soaked twice in the same skit), it appears the rumors are true.
50	Classical Music	October 24, 1983	Justin Cammy, Alasdair Gillis, Abby Hagyard, Les Lye, Christine McGlade, Brodie Osome, Lisa Ruddy	(Pavarotti Sings The Blues) Lisa's sliming includes the thickest slime of the series, because it consisted mostly of leftovers from the previous day's shoot. When Ross plays the ukulele, the sound effects do not play until a full second after he strums it, one of the show's few bloopers to make it to air.
51	Manners aka Bad Habits	February 24, 1984	Alasdair Gillis, Abby Hagyard, Kevin Kubusheskie, Vanessa Lindores, Christine McGlade, Les Lye, Lisa Ruddy	(Laverne and Shirley Go to Finishing School) Christine gives the viewers advice on manners and etiquette from a book written by the show's producers (she was aboout to use a book by Amy Vanderbilt, until Ross informed her she'd be replaced as host unless she used the producers' book). First new episode to be shown in the 23-minute version with commercial breaks.
52	Fame	February 27, 1984	Abby Hagyard, Mike Hora, Kevin Kubusheskie, Les Lye, Christine McGlade, Lisa Ruddy, Klea Scott	(Fame) Kevin seeks fame, starting off by giving himself the new stage name of Kevin Illyanovich Rasputin Kubusheskie, which could get him fired for putting the show over its ink budget in trying to write it out. This episode's plot was inspired by real life, as Kevin Kubusheskie had notified the show's producer's that he wanted to explore other acting opportunities once his contracts were up.
53	Priorities	February 29, 1984	Abby Hagyard, Les Lye, Christine McGlade, Luke McKeehan, Doug Ptolemy, Mike Hora, Lisa Ruddy	(You Can't Do That On Television in order that you get your priorities straight) Ross tries to skip out on the day's taping to attend a baseball game. Christine is also the victim of a double sliming and a double drenching in this episode. When Nickelodeon premiered the 1983 season, it only aired 10 of the 13 episodes before it cycled back to reruns. At the beginning of 1984, 3 additional episodes suddenly premiered without warning - Manners, Fame and Priorities. This was reportedly the last episode of YCDTOTV aired on Nickelodeon before the network took reruns off the schedule in early 1994, and fittingly ends with Christine and Lisa talking about going off to explore the world. This is the third time YCDTOTV preempted itself.

=== Season 5 (1984-1985) ===
Because the show had become Nickelodeon's highest-rated television series and provided extra funding to CJOH, the 1984 season saw double the number of episodes produced, with 26 instead of the usual 13 seen in the seasons prior. New regulars Stephanie Chow, Adam Kalbfleisch, Ben Schreiner, Pauline Kerr (sister of former cast member Martin Kerr) and Marjorie Silcoff, were introduced this season, while future regular Adam Reid appeared for the first time in a brief, non-speaking role, and Angie Coddett, Kevin Kubusheskie, Luke McKeehan, and Klea Scott gave their final performances. One of Les Lye's most popular characters, the reckless school bus driver Snake Eyes, made his debut this season.

No.	Subject	Air Date	Cast	Notes
54	Courage	June 4, 1984	Alasdair Gillis, Abby Hagyard, Kevin Kubusheskie, Les Lye, Christine McGlade, Doug Ptolemy, Lisa Ruddy	(The Smurfs Meet Godzilla) Premiere episode of the 1984 season; Kevin Kubusheskie's last episode. The gang displays a lot of courage to put on the first episode of the new season, and the link set undergoes a facelift. To get all the angles for the opening slime scene, Christine actually had to be slimed 3 times. The reverse angle for slime scenes was quickly abandoned after her complaints. In his swan song, Kevin gets stuck in a suit of armor, which was a reference to a real life scenario in which he got stuck in a costume.
55	Friends	June 7, 1984	Andrew Burke, Alasdair Gillis, Abby Hagyard, Les Lye, Christine McGlade, Luke McKeehan, Lisa Ruddy	(Laverne & Shirley Kill Each Other) Christine's mother has been paying the other kids on the show to be friends with her daughter, so when the cheques fail to arrive on time, the kids all give Christine the cold shoulder, causing her to be slimed, and watered on the show. Ultimately, she pays them each a dollar apiece and regains their friendships. Contains a blooper in the closing scene, when Christine stops playing solitaire (thinking the credits were over), and then immediately looks back down at the cards after seeing on the monitor that they were not.
56	Ambition	June 12, 1984	Alasdair Gillis, Abby Hagyard, Les Lye, Christine McGlade, Doug Ptolemy, Lisa Ruddy, Ben Schreiner	(Dallas & Dynasty) The gang discuss their ambitions in life, especially Christine, who is attempting to broaden her horizons as an actress, while Ben tries to learn to dance like Michael Jackson. After Christine is slimed, she ad-libs the words "I don't know," but the slime does not fall; however, she is drenched a second time for saying "Water" a second time. The second episode to feature "Snake Eyes (after Friends)
57	Hobbies	June 15, 1984	Wyatt Boyd, Justin Cammy, Abby Hagyard, Vanessa Lindores, Christine McGlade, Les Lye, Lisa Ruddy	(Hobby Days) The show's theme is illustrated by Christine going on an exercise kick, since it is her favorite hobby...as of a week ago. Christine's hair and outfit (both eventually ruined by slime, after she admits she doesn't know the recipe for the slime) were done to reference Jane Fonda, whose workout tapes were popular at the time. When Moose and Lisa show Ross their "stamp collections" (Lisa stamps on Ross' feet while Moose stamps Ross' forehead with ink), it is a direct reference to the show's opening animation's content.
58	ESP, Magic and Astrology	June 20, 1984	Abby Hagyard, Les Lye, Korbett Matthews, Kyle Matthews, Christine McGlade, Lisa Ruddy, Klea Scott	(The Twilight Zone Gets Redeveloped) Strange things start happening around the studio and a poltergeist is feared. Luckily, Lisa figures out how to exorcise it. Parodies of ESP and seances, as well as the Genie of the Electric Lamp, are featured. The locker jokes segment contains a rare instance of both the purple and red lockers being used in the same sketch. Klea Scott's last episode, and only episode featuring twins Korbett and Kyle Matthews. Includes a blooper in the final scene, where Christine crashes through a false studio door and takes a nasty spill.
59	Literature	June 21, 1984	Justin Cammy, Alasdair Gillis, Abby Hagyard, Les Lye, Christine McGlade, Lisa Ruddy, Ben Schreiner	(Masterpiece Theatre) The gang looks at the classics while Christine attempts to become a writer for the show, and Justin studies the origins of that famous author "A. Nonymous". Contains two botched slimings; Christine's was ultimately cut from the broadcast, while Ben's remained in the episode, and features him looking up expectantly before the actual slime falls.
60	Clubs	June 25, 1984	Eugene Contreras, Abby Hagyard, Les Lye, Christine McGlade, Lisa Ruddy, Ben Schreiner, Marjorie Silcoff	(The Mickey Mouse Club) Christine joins a health club but is more infatuated with everything BUT health. She changes outfits three times during the show. The only episode of the entire series to not feature any official stage pollution. That said, the episode does feature flour bombs from exploding books.
61	Foreign Countries	June 28, 1984	Mike Cameron, Angie Coddett, Alasdair Gillis, Abby Hagyard, Pauline Kerr, Les Lye, Christine McGlade, Eugene Miyagawa	(Around The World In 80 Days) The kids salute the various countries airing the show by spotlighting their cultures during the links, while Ross dabbles in foreign currencies and exchanges them with the travel-bound cast. This episode has the only sliming to take place in the school hallway (Eugene), and features a much thicker and chunkier slime consistency than the rest of the season's episodes. Lisa Ruddy is conspicuously missing from this episode, but is referenced in the locker jokes and closing link. Angie Coddett's final episode.
62	Marketing	July 3, 1984	Kevin Akyeampong, Justin Cammy, Abby Hagyard, Les Lye, Christine McGlade, Lisa Ruddy, Marjorie Silcoff	The gang try to come up with a merchandising plan to keep the show on the air, and finally decide on marketing Green Slime, despite their disdain for having it dumped on them. This episode's preempt is "Miss Piggy Sold To A Sausage Factory", and the graphic is very similar to the actual opening animation of the show. Justin is slimed for the first and only time in this episode, and notably flubs it, looking up in anticipation of the slime after saying the magic words, but then cowering and flinching as the slime falls.
63	History	July 11, 1984	Todd Corrigan, Alasdair Gillis, Abby Hagyard, Les Lye, Christine McGlade, Lisa Ruddy, Marjorie Silcoff	(The Six Wives of Henry VIII) The gang goes back in time as Alasdair researches his descendance from royalty and Christine writes an essay about great women in history. This is the first appearance of Marjorie Silcoff in the series and final appearance of Todd Corrigan in the series. Todd is one of the unlucky "one-episode wonders" to be slimed in his only appearance.
64	Body Parts	July 12, 1984	Alasdair Gillis, Karen Grant, Abby Hagyard, Les Lye, Christine McGlade, Lisa Ruddy, Ben Schreiner	(Real People's Armpits) The kids hold a "Perfect Body" contest. On the Nickelodeon edit of this episode, three sketches were cut, including Karin Grant's only sliming. The first was an "Introduction to the Opposites" sketch in which Mr. Schidtler shows a pornographic video to his class. The 2nd was a sketch in which Alasdair sells Playboy magazines to his friends. The third was a link sketch that featured a joke in which Karin Grant describes her favorite body part of a man as "what's in the pants" (she then clarifies to Moose that she's referring to his wallet, and gets green slimed thereafter). The Nickelodeon cut added two unaired sketches and added an extra commercial break to cover up the cuts. The two unaired sketches are: Moose is tricked into eating a chocolate-covered grasshopper, and Ben visits the Groucho Marx-esque doctor played by Les Lye about his leg being put on backwards.
65	Technology	July 19, 1984	Eugene Contreras, Abby Hagyard, Vanessa Lindores, Les Lye, Luke McKeehan, Christine McGlade, Lisa Ruddy	(The Electric Company Blows A Fuse) The famous "Red Square, Green Square" show. This episode featured an interactive device that allows viewers to determine the outcome of a scene by touching red or green squares on their screens. Viewers chose to; shoot Luke, slime Vanessa, dump water on Christine, and prevent Lisa from being able to talk for the rest of the show. Christine and Eugene are also slimed and watered as part of an interactive video game at Blip's. Vanessa's sliming in the dungeon was a throwback to the show's first season, complete with toilet flushing sound effects and all. Luke McKeehan's last episode.
66	Moving	July 20, 1984	Abby Hagyard, Adam Kalbfleisch, Vanessa Lindores, Les Lye, Christine McGlade, Doug Ptolemy, Lisa Ruddy, and Alasdair Gillis (uncredited)	(Mr. Rogers Gets Evicted) Christine's family joins the upper crust of society with their move to the Rolling Fairways. In this episode, the kids carry, with ease, some very interesting props across the link set—including a giant cactus and a large piano.
67	Halloween	October 9, 1984	Mike Cameron, Alasdair Gillis, Abby Hagyard, Les Lye, Christine McGlade, Doug Ptolemy, Lisa Ruddy	(Boy George Without Make-Up) Ghosts and goblins are abound as Ross is hit with a run of bad luck and suspects that Christine is a witch who put a curse on him. In subsequent years, Nickelodeon would always play this episode on Halloween. Mike Cameron is slimed, yet another "one-episode wonder" to face the green bucket in his only appearance.
68	Christmas	December 8, 1984	Alasdair Gillis, Abby Hagyard, Vanessa Lindores, Les Lye, Christine McGlade, Doug Ptolemy, Lisa Ruddy	(Rudolph The Red Nosed Reindeer Joins The A-Team) As the kids eagerly await their holiday bonuses, Alasdair inundates the studio with mistletoe to get the girls to kiss him. After she's been slimed, Lisa and Alasdair improv a slime themed "carol" to the tune of "Joy to the World", the beginning of which made the final cut of the episode.
69	Holidays	January 1, 1985	Alasdair Gillis, Abby Hagyard, Vanessa Lindores, Les Lye, Christine McGlade, Doug Ptolemy, Lisa Ruddy	(The A-Team Wreck Disneyland) The gang try to convince Ross that actors need a special holiday too, as not only Christmas and Halloween but all other holidays are subject to parody. When Vanessa brings a turkey named Lester onto the link set in this episode, it is a reference to Les Lye's birth name. This was the "premiere" episode of the second batch of the 1984 season's episodes.
70	Colleges	January 4, 1985	Alasdair Gillis, Justin Cammy, Abby Hagyard, Christine McGlade, Les Lye, Lisa Ruddy, Marjorie Silcoff	(MIT VS UCLA) Alasdair tries to get into college on a video game scholarship. Ross goes back to college in this episode. In one skit, he is seen on the link set waving a college pennant. The letters on the pennant are UHU, which is "yoohoo." Pi Iota Epsilon, the fictional fraternity used in the production bumper, stands for P.I.E., a reference to the cast being pied in the face as hazing.
71	Politics	January 8, 1985	Justin Cammy, Alasdair Gillis, Karen Grant, Abby Hagyard, Les Lye, Christine McGlade, Lisa Ruddy	(To Tell The Truth with guest host Richard Nixon) Lisa runs for class president, with Christine as her campaign manager. When Alasdair replied "slimy" to Justin's question about describing present-day politicians, Justin mistook Alasdair's answer as "Slime me" and immediately poured a bucket of slime over Alasdair's head, one of the rare times in which one of the kids slimed a castmate (another time was in 1979, when Elizabeth Mitchell dumped a bucket on Christine and Kevin Schenk at once).
72	Science	January 11, 1985	Justin Cammy, Alasdair Gillis, Abby Hagyard, Les Lye, Christine McGlade, Lisa Ruddy, Ben Schreiner	(Dr. Jekyll and Mr. Wizard) Alasdair sets out to discover the secret ingredients of Green Slime. This was the well-known episode in which Alasdair read the ingredients of green slime on-air, only to have Ross run the credits and theme music on top of him, thus drowning out his voice. After the credits, Ross informs the kids that the audience never heard a word, and then eats the paper with the recipe written on it.
73	Divorce	January 15, 1985	Justin Cammy, Matt Cook, Alasdair Gillis, Abby Hagyard, Les Lye, Christine McGlade, Lisa Ruddy, Marjorie Silcoff	(Family Ties Get Untied) The producer and his wife are getting a divorce, and she is committed to taking half of everything in the studio - including green slime. When Lisa says the magic words, the whole bucket of slime is dumped on her left side of her head, promoting the idea that the right side of slimings had been lost in the divorce. Unfortunately for Lisa, they had to film multiple attempts to get this effect right, and ultimately had to use a lumpier slime recipe to get it to pour correctly.
74	Families	January 18, 1985	Stephanie Chow, Alasdair Gillis, Abby Hagyard, Les Lye, Christine McGlade, Jeff Mousseau, Lisa Ruddy	(The Partridge Family Gets Shot) Ross's nephew, Jeff, joins the cast. Despite Jeff being his nephew, Ross bullies him just as badly as, if not worse, than the others. Jeff does get a brief reprieve when Christine is watered in his place, with Ross claiming that Jeff's mother will be furious if he gets wet, but Jeff gets a sliming later to Ross's horror. This episode ends with the locker jokes, with Ross locking the kids in their lockers.
75	Malls (Hangouts)	January 22, 1985	Alasdair Gillis, Abby Hagyard, Adam Kalbfleisch, Les Lye, Christine McGlade, Lisa Ruddy, Ruth Westdal, Aneal Bhartia, Mike Maguire	(The A-Team Makes One Cup Of Coffee Last 5 Hours) The kids illustrate the theme of "hanging out" by loafing around the studio, while Adam becomes infatuated with Christine. Ruth Westdal's only episode. When Adam is watered, there's ice cubes in it, because Ross told him to "cool down" earlier in the scene.
76	Seasons (Weather)	January 25, 1985	Alasdair Gillis, Karen Grant, Abby Hagyard, Les Lye, Christine McGlade, Lisa Ruddy, Ben Schreiner	(Mr. Wizard Shows You How To Make Rain) Alasdair devises a machine to illustrate various types of weather on the link set, resulting in a torrential rainstorm, a blizzard, a downpour of slime on poor Lisa, and finally a crippling heat wave. This episode was one of the very few to use another Nick series as the pre-empt (Mr. Wizard's World).
77	War	January 29, 1985	Alasdair Gillis, Abby Hagyard, Adam Kalbfleisch, Vanessa Lindores, Les Lye, Christine McGlade, Claude Valiquette	(The Love Boat Goes On A Cruise Missile Cruise) Alasdair forms a pacifist organization called WIMP (War Insane, Make Peace), while Ross preaches about the benefits of war. Alasdair and Adam appear in several war skits in which they're in a bunker made of rocks. This was an exact copy of a string of war skits with Dan Rowan and Dick Martin on an episode of Laugh-In, which YCDTOTV frequently paid homage to.
78	Jealousy	February 1, 1985	Alasdair Gillis, Abby Hagyard, Les Lye, Christine McGlade, Doug Ptolemy, Lisa Ruddy, Marjorie Silcoff	(KNIGHT RIDER Wants A Ferrari) The kids - especially Lisa - cannot hide their jealousy when Christine is given a raise. In Marjorie's water scene, she asks Christine if she's jealous that she doesn't have the privilege of drinking liquor while her parents do; in real life, Christine was in her early 20s by this time, and was legally able to drink under Ontario law.
79	Wealth	February 5, 1985	Justin Cammy, Alasdair Gillis, Abby Hagyard, Pauline Kerr, Les Lye, Christine McGlade, Lisa Ruddy, Adam Reid, Scott Cherkewich	(Dunking For Dollars) The series gets sold to several different countries (until they see it). One of the few episodes to include stage pollution without the trigger phrases being uttered; Christine and Lisa are watered and slimed, much to their dismay, after Ross says that the first order of business is more slime and water jokes now that he's bought the show. Adam Reid appears in a brief, non-speaking role as young millionaire "Ronald Rump." He would become a regular beginning the following season.

=== Season 6 (1985) ===
To prepare for the departure of long-time host Christine McGlade, Alasdair Gillis became a co-host alongside her. Adam Reid became a new regular cast member, while Lisa Ruddy began her last season on the show. This was also the final season with Blip's Arkaid, as home video game systems had begun to eclipse video arcades in popularity.

No.	Subject	Air Date	Cast	Notes
80	Outer Space	October 14, 1985	Alasdair Gillis, Abby Hagyard, Les Lye, Christine McGlade, Doug Ptolemy, Adam Reid, Lisa Ruddy	(Carl Sagan Meets Billions and Billions of Martians) In Adam Reid's first episode as a regular, Doug prepares to become an astronaut. The closing theme uses a slightly sped up version for the first 5 episodes of the 1985 season. The Announcer (Les Lye) does his best (read: the worst) impression of Carl Sagan during the intro.
81	Wildlife and Animals	October 15, 1985	Eugene Contreras, Alasdair Gillis, Abby Hagyard, Vanessa Lindores, Les Lye, Christine McGlade, Lisa Ruddy	(Wild, Wild Kingdom) After Lisa hits him over the head, Alasdair begins acting like a dog, then a monkey. The scene where Vanessa is slimed twice was originally written for Christine, but she was able to complain to the network and get it changed to poor Vanessa (who had to be reassured that the show would replace her outfit if it got ruined before she'd go through with it). Lisa assumes that the show's theme 'wildlife' means partying and the like, so she dresses up Cyndi Lauper-ish. Les plays the part of 'Joke of Jungle - King of Beasts, Ruler of Reptiles, Student Who Flunk English Class'.
82	World Records	October 16, 1985	Stephanie Chow, Alasdair Gillis, Abby Hagyard, Adam Kalbfleisch, Les Lye, Christine McGlade, Lisa Ruddy	(Ripley's Incredibly Amazing Believe It Or Not People) Alasdair endeavors to break a world record for eating hard-boiled eggs, which are supplied by "Ross's Egg-o-Rama, Route 12, King Side Road." Stephanie Chow is slimed at Barth's, the only time that ever happened, and Barth implies that green slime is the secret ingredient to his burgers.
83	Identity Crisis	October 17, 1985	Justin Cammy, Alasdair Gillis, Abby Hagyard, Les Lye, Christine McGlade, Lisa Ruddy, Marjorie Silcoff	(Mr. T. Thinks He's A Girl) Alasdair explores different identities to discover which one is "the real him." He manages to trick Christine into getting slimed, one of only two times she was slimed this whole season. However, Christine managed to have the script rewritten so that Alasdair's attempt to trick her into getting watered would fail and he would be drenched himself.
84	Pessimism/Optimism	October 18, 1985	Alasdair Gillis, Abby Hagyard, Vanessa Lindores, Les Lye, Christine McGlade, Doug Ptolemy, Lisa Ruddy	(The Wreck of the Love Boat) Lisa's plant is dying, and she tries to bring it back to life with optimistic thoughts, but it turns out it only needed wa- ...that is, liquid. Doug and Vanessa had a real life love-hate relationship, and when Doug is slimed (looking up three times and getting his entire face covered), he reaches over to pat Vanessa on the shoulder (making sure to get some on her).
85	Romance and Dating	November 11, 1985	Alasdair Gillis, Abby Hagyard, Vanessa Lindores, Les Lye, Christine McGlade, Doug Ptolemy, Lisa Ruddy	(Love Connection Short Circuits) Lisa receives tokens of affection from a secret admirer. Alasdair hosts this episode. With Christine preparing to depart the show, she and Alasdair shared hosting duties through the sixth season so her eventual absence would not be keenly felt. Writer Robert Black appears as Barth's unnamed employee in this episode.
86	Fears, Worries, and Anxiety	November 12, 1985	Alasdair Gillis, Abby Hagyard, Vanessa Lindores, Les Lye, Christine McGlade, Doug Ptolemy, Lisa Ruddy	(Super Monster Theatre) Christine tries to help Alasdair get in touch with his greatest fears. On the Nickelodeon rerun of this episode, a sketch where Alasdair is scared of going to school because of a bully named "Killer Curtis" had "Killer Curtis" redubbed to "Crusher Willis," as "Killer Curtis" was the alias of a serial killer who was in the news at the time. The change is obvious, as Alasdair's voice had changed from puberty between the episode's premiere in Canada and its premiere in America.
87	Relatives	November 13, 1985	Stephanie Chow, Alasdair Gillis, Abby Hagyard, Adam Kalbfleisch, Les Lye, Christine McGlade, Lisa Ruddy	(Family Ties Tied Much Too Tight) Ross offers to draw up each of the kids' family trees. The kids realize too late that Ross has tricked them when all of their charts turn out to be identical. Barth's mother, instead of being properly called "Mother Baggs," is instead called "Ma Barth." This would be in reference to "Ma Barker," a woman who, in the 1930s, became infamous as a protector of her high-profile criminal brood.
88	Revenge	November 14, 1985	Justin Cammy, Alasdair Gillis, Abby Hagyard, Les Lye, Christine McGlade, Lisa Ruddy, Marjorie Silcoff	(Rambo Shoots the Ayatollah) Justin Cammy and Majorie Silcoff's last episode. Alasdair tries to get revenge on Christine and Lisa for embarrassing him during the opening link, with varying degrees of success. Originally Marjorie was to be slimed as revenge by the rest of the cast, but the sketch was prior to filming.
89	Movies	November 15, 1985	Eugene Contreras, Alasdair Gillis, Abby Hagyard, Les Lye, Christine McGlade, Adam Reid, Lisa Ruddy	(Children of the Corn) Final episode for both Eugene Contreras and Lisa Ruddy as cast members (who is the victim of both slime and water - in the same skit - in her final episode). Fredrico Panzarotti, a famous Italian movie director (played by Les Lye) visits the set to make a movie about the show, but the kids all fail their screen tests by getting slimed. In this episode the entire cast except Abby Hagyard is slimed, a response to Nickelodeon's requesting more slime scenes.

=== Season 7 (1986-1987) ===
While still in its height popularity-wise, the 1986 season saw many changes for the show. Most notably, long-time host Christine McGlade and fan favorite Alasdair Gillis would both leave, and frequent director Geoffrey Darby would be replaced by Brenda Mason, who would go on to direct the remaining episodes of the show's "original run". The season also began to see the show's dark comedy shift from black comedy more towards "gross-out humour", featuring characters getting dumped on with pig manure (Vanessa), elephant dung (Alasdair & Vanessa), vomit (James, Stephanie), and toilet water (Matthew) in addition to the regular stage pollution. Potty humour would become even more prevalent in later seasons however. To complete her contract obligations, Christine appeared only in the first five episodes of this season until she left after the fifth episode. Alasdair Gillis succeeded her as host until he too left towards the end of the season. Matthew Godfrey, Amyas Godfrey, Andrea Byrne, and Alanis Morissette all joined the regular cast.

No.	Subject	Air Date	Cast	Notes
90	Fairy Tales, Myths, and Legends	August 11, 1986	Alasdair Gillis, Amyas Godfrey, Abby Hagyard, Sarah Keelan, Vanessa Lindores, Les Lye, Christine McGlade	(The A-Team Blows Up The Land Of Oz) As the kids skewer popular fairy tales, Alasdair tries his hand at alchemy. Vanessa gets slimed with orange "paint" in the opening for messing with the superstition of walking under a ladder (one of the few times a cast member gets it without saying the magic words). First episode to feature Amyas Godfrey and Sarah Keelan's only episode.
91	Pop Music	August 12, 1986	Stephanie Chow, Alasdair Gillis, Abby Hagyard, Les Lye, Christine McGlade, Alanis Morissette, Adam Reid	(Bruce Springsteen Gets Laryngitis) In Alanis Morissette's first episode, Alasdair sets his sights on rock stardom and decides to bring the others along as his touring band. One of a handful of episodes that Nickelodeon re-aired in syndication (presumably due to Morissette's fame). As with previous cast members, she was initiated with a sliming.
92	Know-It-Alls	August 13, 1986	Alasdair Gillis, Matthew Godfrey, Abby Hagyard, Vanessa Lindores, Les Lye, Christine McGlade, Doug Ptolemy	(Mr. Wizard Explains the Universe) Matthew Godfrey is introduced in this episode as the show's nerdy know-it-all, as the other kids try in vain to put him in his place. This was Matthew Godfrey's first episode, and he is slimed, watered and hit with pies, the unofficial You Can't Do That On Television initiation (Alanis Morissette, Eugene Miyagawa, Jody Morris, Libby Livingston, and Naida Gosselin also faced stage pollution in their first - and in Eugene, Libby, and Naida's case, their only - episodes).
93	Parties	August 14, 1986	Kai Engstad, Alasdair Gillis, Abby Hagyard, Les Lye, Christine McGlade, Alanis Morissette, Adam Reid	(Mr. T goes to a Tupperware Party) The Kids try to convince Ross to throw a party, and Alasdair and Adam fight over who will get to ask Alanis to the network party. Kai Engstad is dowsed with water in his first and only appearance on the show, which supports the initiation of newcomers conspiracy. Was intended to be the 1986 Season Premiere originally.
94	Garbage	August 15, 1986	Alasdair Gillis, Abby Hagyard, Vanessa Lindores, Les Lye, Christine McGlade, Doug Ptolemy, Rekha Shah	(Garbage of the Rich & Famous) The city's garbage workers go on strike, turning the link set into a temporary dump. First episode to feature Rekah Shah. Final episode for longtime cast member and host Christine McGlade.
95	TV Commercials	August 18, 1986	Stephanie Chow, Robert Enns, Alasdair Gillis, Abby Hagyard, Les Lye, Alanis Morissette, Doug Ptolemy	Ross forces the kids to peddle his personal products - a cosmetic line and a cooking utensil that does not cut anything but peoples' fingers - in between sketches parodying TV commercials. Robert Enns continues the 1986 initiation conspiracy, being slimed in his first appearance. Alanis Morissette was also slimed at least once in this episode, however this was cut from the final version due to time. This episode featured a return of the parody ads that were a frequent feature of the show's initial CJOH run.
96	Country Life	August 19, 1986	Matthew Godfrey, Abby Hagyard, Adam Kalbfleisch, Vanessa Lindores, Les Lye, M.J. Malcolm, Adam Reid	(The Walton's Mountain Becomes An Open Pit Mine) The kids get a taste of country and farm life. This entire episode was inspired by Matthew and Amyas Godfrey's moving from Texas to Ottawa. A recurring gag in this episode parodies the TV series The Waltons. Final episode for cast member Adam Kalbfleisch.
97	Back to School	August 20, 1986	Andrea Byrne, Alasdair Gillis, Amyas Godfrey, Abby Hagyard, Vanessa Lindores, Les Lye, Adam Reid	(Lassie Flunks Obedience School) Ross gets bit by the studio schooling bug as he teaches the gang to spell, solve chemical equations and carry the decimal point. At the end of the show, Adam hits Mr. Schidtler (Les) with a pie, the last time until 1990 that there would be stage pollution in the classroom. First episode for Andrea Byrne.
98	Illness	August 21, 1986	Alasdair Gillis, Abby Hagyard, Vanessa Lindores, Les Lye, Jody Morris, Doug Ptolemy, Rekha Shah	(St. Elsewhere) The cast are stricken with Green Slime Flu, which causes the inflicted to break out in chicken pox-like green spots. One of the few episodes where every cast member (except for Abby Hagyard) got slimed. To make the slime look extra disgusting for this episode, they used leftover food from the cafeteria. First episode for Jody Morris.
99	Enemies and Paranoia	August 22, 1986	Stephanie Chow, Matthew Godfrey, Abby Hagyard, Les Lye, Alanis Morissette, Chris Nolan, Adam Reid	(Hulk Hogan vs. Punky Brewster in Mismatch of the Century) Ross and the kids (Adam, Stephanie, Matthew, Alanis, and Chris) Alanis, prepare for an invasion by the Soviets and their show "Don't Do That On Television, Comrade!", complete with red slime. The first episode to feature a new trigger phrase for slime ("Free"). Ross is holding a glass of vodka during the introduction to the opposites, a nod to both Russia, as well as the atomic age. First episode for Chris Nolan.
100	Contests	1986	Alasdair Gillis, Matthew Godfrey, Abby Hagyard, Vanessa Lindores, Les Lye, Alanis Morissette, Adam Reid	(Miss Ugly Teen USA) Premiere Date unknown. While Matthew counts jelly beans in order to win a counting contest at the mall, Alasdair enters the network's Slime-In contest. There was confusion throughout this episode as to what Nickelodeon's annual slime contest was actually called. In one place, Ross correctly calls it the "Slime-In Contest", whereas later Alasdair calls it the "Slime-In Sweepstakes". In the remainder of the show, it is referred to as the "network's Green Slime Contest". This was because the show was broadcast on different networks, and Canadian viewers had the "Slime-light sweepstakes" instead of Nickelodeon's "Slime-In" Contest. This is Alanis Morissette's final episode. The U.S. broadcast the 1986 Slime-In contest winner Lori Petrusky getting slimed.
101	Censorship	1986	Alasdair Gillis, Abby Hagyard, Vanessa Lindores, Les Lye, Jody Morris, Doug Ptolemy, James Tung, and Matthew Godfrey (uncredited)	Premiere Date Unknown. (Censored Foul-Ups, Bleeps & Boners) Ross attempts to "clean up" the show's image by forcing the kids to wear sailor suits. This episode was a response to the increasing number of network notes the show was receiving. The credit roll in this episode is an awesome sequence in which Alasdair runs toward the camera with a pie. The picture is paused, a censor bleep is heard, a "censored" graphic then appears on the screen, and the credits roll overtop the paused picture of Alasdair about to splat the pie into the lens of the camera.
102	Poverty and Unemployment	1986	Robert Enns, Alasdair Gillis, Naida Gosselin, Abby Hagyard, Vanessa Lindores, Les Lye, Doug Ptolemy	(Lifestyles Of The Poor & Unknown) Premiere Date Unknown. When the kids are fired by the show, snotty rich girl Naida gets them all jobs by having her father, the show's producer, hire them as her personal servants. This was Naida's only episode, and she was victim of a particularly long and nasty sliming as her character's comeuppance at the end of the show.
103	Part-Time Jobs	1986	Andrea Byrne, Alasdair Gillis, Amyas Godfrey, Abby Hagyard, Vanessa Lindores, Les Lye, Adam Reid	(The A-Team Delivers Newspapers) Premiere Date Unknown. A hilarious recurring scene with Adam Reid and Abby Hagyard is one of the highlights in this look at the job market for kids. Abby Hagyard is watered for the first time in this episode.
104	Discipline	1986	Amyas Godfrey, Matthew Godfrey, Abby Hagyard, Vanessa Lindores, Les Lye, Doug Ptolemy, Adam Reid	(Top Gun Gets Put On Latrine Cleaning Duty) Premiere Date Unknown. Ross plays drill sergeant on the link set and tries to whip the kids into shape. It was unscripted when Matthew grabs his cap, which had fallen off during his sliming and caught slime inside of it, and puts it on his brother Amyas' head, but the producer's liked the moment so much they kept it in. The closing credits are sped up and feature references to Monty Python, a Roger Price favorite.
105	Sleep	December 29, 1986	Matthew Godfrey, Abby Hagyard, Vanessa Lindores, Les Lye, Doug Ptolemy, Adam Reid, Vikram Sahay	(Algebra is Exciting!) The kids try to snatch some shut-eye whenever they can during an all-night taping session. This episode was based on a real life "lock in" the cast had requested, but were not allowed due to network oversight. Adam has orange juice, milk, and oatmeal dumped down his shirt after requesting breakfast in bed, which was supposedly based on a real life occurrence.
106	Home	December 30, 1986	Andrea Byrne, Alasdair Gillis, Matthew Godfrey, Abby Hagyard, Vanessa Lindores, Les Lye, Doug Ptolemy	(Falcon Crest Eaten By Termites) The gang talks about the fun and comforts of home. Right before the credits, Doug puts an arm around Vanessa and immediately says "I don't know.", causing them both to be slimed. A lot of YCDTOTV was based on reality, and the Doug/Vanessa brother/sister rivalry was very much a real-life thing.
107	Mysteries and Crimes	December 31, 1986	Stephanie Chow, Alasdair Gillis, Abby Hagyard, Vanessa Lindores, Les Lye, Doug Ptolemy, Adam Reid	(The Greatest Detective) As Vanessa tries to get the missing pages of her mystery novel back from Doug, Adam investigates a series of disappearances around the studio. After Doug tricks Vanessa into getting slimed, she makes sure to hug him, playing into their friendship. She later gets revenge by pieing him during the closing credits.
108	Luck	January 1, 1987	Matthew Godfrey, Abby Hagyard, Vanessa Lindores, Les Lye, Jody Morris, Doug Ptolemy, Adam Reid	(The Wheel of Fortune Runs Over People & Flattens Them) It's all about rabbit's feet and horseshoes as the gang rely on their charms for luck. Vanessa's sliming at the end of this episode was based on a real life comment she made (jokingly) about hanging out with Doug being worse than getting slimed. As the credits roll, she can be heard joking around with Adam and Doug about now regretting that comment.
109	Savings aka Saving Money	January 2, 1987	Alasdair Gillis, Abby Hagyard, Vanessa Lindores, Libby Livingston, Les Lye, Chris Nolan, Adam Reid	(J.R. Ewing Saves His Money To Buy A Skateboard) In his final episode, Alasdair attempts to save up enough cash to buy a car while he and Adam vie for the attention of the new girl, Libby. This was the last 1986 episode aired in the United States. This was Libby's only episode, and she receives a watering.

=== Season 8 (1987) ===
By this time, all but four of the second generation cast had already ended their time on the show, and it was supposed to be the final season. Only five episodes were filmed and aired, one of which ("Adoption") was banned for making light of child abuse (in Canada, the "Adoption" episode was edited to remove the "damn" in Senator Prevert's line "You get over here right away, ya damn bureaucrat!", but the episode was eventually pulled because the producers felt the episode's jokes about adoption were in bad taste). This makes this season the shortest season of the show, tied with the season in 1990. Despite the short production order, the show was as popular as ever on Nickelodeon, and re-runs were still broadcast as part of the network's daily programming. Vanessa continued to handle most of the hosting duties, while Adam continued working as both a cast member and a writer on the show. Tone-wise, the show continued its trend towards being more slime-gag and potty humour oriented, with all of the episodes featuring additional stage pollution to the regular slime, water, and pies, and several of the episode topics being chosen specifically for their ability to cater towards toilet humour. An hour-long special was also prepared for home video, but not released. It was known as The Worst of You Can't Do That on Television and included new footage with Adam Reid, Vanessa Lindores, and Doug Plotemy as hosts, as well as footage from 1979–1987.

No.	Subject	Air Date	Cast	Notes
110	Books and Reading	1987	Andrea Byrne, Stephanie Chow, Matthew Godfrey, Abby Hagyard, Les Lye, Adam Reid, Vikram Sahay	(Reading Rambo) Upon learning that the episode is about reading, the librarian (Abby Hagyard) prepares for stardom, only to end up disappointed when the show has only one sketch in the library (which she is not even in). Ross does not appear in this episode. His voice is only heard, saying "Okay, show's over," in the last scene. Instead, Abby as the librarian is used on the link set with the frequency of Ross throughout the episode. The only other episode in which Les didn't appear as Ross was "Peer Pressure" from 1981.
111	Adoption	1987	Andrea Byrne, Amyas Godfrey, Abby Hagyard, Vanessa Lindores, Les Lye, Doug Ptolemy, Adam Reid	(The Huxtables Put Their Kids Up For Adoption) Terrified at the thought that she and Doug may be related, Vanessa tries to discover whether she was adopted, "Little Orphan Andrea" strikes terror into the hearts of all, Snake-Eyes the bus driver gets his revenge on the orphanage he was put in after killing his parents as a child, and Senator Prevert learns that adopting kids is not the same as hiring housekeepers. This episode was banned on Nickelodeon in America after airing twice due to complaints that the episode depicted adopted children as targets for abuse and neglect (as well as crude sexual references, as seen in the "Adopt a Child" fake commercial where one of Dougie's hobbies is reading Playboy magazines and looking up girls' skirts). In Canada, Senator Prevert's "damn" was bleeped out in the line "You get over here right here, ya damn bureaucrat!" and the episode eventually was pulled from rotation due to the producers feeling the jokes about adoption were in bad taste. To date, the only episode of the show to ever be banned.
112	City Life	1987	Andrea Byrne, Matthew Godfrey, Abby Hagyard, Vanessa Lindores, Les Lye, Doug Ptolemy, Adam Reid	(Crocodile Dundee Works In A City Bank) Ross prepares the kids for their trip to the big city - on which they'll be forced to visit museums and wear sissy sailor suits - until Doug figures out a way to get out of it. During the scene where people are walking through the dungeon (which is now part of the subway system) Roger Price and Dean Carley can be spotted.
113	Anniversaries	1987	Stephanie Chow, Matthew Godfrey, Abby Hagyard, Vanessa Lindores, Les Lye, Doug Ptolemy, Vikram Sahay	(Santa Claus Forgets Christmas) As Doug and Vanessa celebrate their anniversary on the show, the cast suspect that Ross poisons the studio food to keep them from growing taller. References to Christine McGlade, Lisa Ruddy, Alasdair Gillis, and Kevin Kubusheskie are made in this episode. Last episode for Vikram Sahay.
114	Smells	1987	Amyas Godfrey, Matthew Godfrey, Abby Hagyard, Vanessa Lindores, Les Lye, Doug Ptolemy, Adam Reid	(Rambo's Armpits) Final episode for Adam Reid, Vanessa Lindores, Doug Ptolemy, Stephanie Chow, and Matthew Godfrey. The show pioneers a new technology to allow viewers to experience the smells of the studio, which Ross tests out on the cast. Smellyvision is a direct reference to Smell-O-Vision, although in true YCDTOTV fashion, their version revolves around the cast having to smell undesirable things like Doug's farts (Vanessa) or Ross' feet (Adam). When Ross tests the Smellyvision machine on Doug, electrodes are fastened to Doug's nose. Doug is wearing a horribly obvious plastic nose, as the original prop they made would not stay on. Vanessa's real cat makes a cameo in the post-credit scene.
SP-1	The Worst of You Can't Do That on Television	no air date	Vanessa Lindores, Les Lye, Doug Ptolemy, Adam Reid	Vanessa, Doug and Adam host a retrospective of the show's first eight years (including then-rare footage from the 1979 season and from Whatever Turns You On). Features Adam and Doug being watered and Vanessa getting slimed (and with the new recipe, which she was non-too pleased about). This special was filmed in the spring of 1987 and planned as a home video release to culminate the series after the 1987 season aired, however this version was never released in the US due to the show coming back on air for the 1989 and 1990 seasons. When the show finally did end for good, "The Worst Of" was remade in 1989 with a shorter running time, and Chris Bickford, Christian Tessier, and Jennifer Brackenbury as the hosts. "Bootleg" copies of the 1987 version have been widely available on the internet, and its production has been referenced in several panels and Q&A's, with Vanessa claiming her sliming from the shoot was her worst memory from the show, and Doug joking that the cast, "in true YCDTOTV fashion", were not paid extra for their participation in it.

=== Season 9 (1989-1990) ===
After a hiatus, filming on what would become the 1989 season of the show commenced in the fall of 1988 with an almost entirely new cast of kids. Only Amyas Godfrey and Andrea Byrne returned from the 1987 season (and the latter for only one episode), although two other members of the 1986 cast (Rekha Shah and James Tung) returned for one or two episodes and Sidharth Sahay replaced his brother, 1986-87 cast member Vikram. In addition, Vanessa Lindores also returned to guest-host the "Age" episode (which also featured cameos by several other former cast members). Chris Bickford was made as the official host, although some other kids, including Jill and Amy Stanley, Christian Tessier, and Rekha Shah, also took turns at hosting. Adam Reid and Kevin Kubusheskie became a writer and a producer, respectively, and had occasional cameos. The first episodes of this season premiered concurrently with a tie-in promotion for the 1989 edition of Nickelodeon's Slime-In Sweepstakes (including a commercial introducing some of the "new kids" in which Nick Belcourt, Christian Tessier, Chris Bickford and Amyas Godfrey were all slimed). This season was almost filmed at Nickelodeon Studios in Orlando, Florida, but at the last minute the decision was made to stay at CJOH, although a replica of the link set had been recreated in Florida. The Worst of You Can't Do That on Television was remade (albeit shortened to a half hour) with Chris Bickford, Jennifer Brackenbury, and Christian Tessier as hosts, and released on video in time for the 1989 holiday season. Les Lye's "doctor" character was also changed to a dentist this season.

No.	Subject	Air Date	Cast	Notes
115	Choice	May 8, 1989	Stephanie Bauder, Nick Belcourt, Chris Bickford, Jennifer Brackenbury, Abby Hagyard, Les Lye, Ted Wilson	(Where No Man Has Gone Before) First episode for Stephanie Bauder, Nick Belcourt, Chris Bickford, Jennifer Brackenbury, and Ted Wilson. Ted must decide whether to tell Chris about being turned down for a major movie role. Despite having an entirely new cast, the episode makes no direct mention of it, or the previous cast, and instead picks up as if it had never gone on hiatus. This episode feature the famous angel and devil characters, both of which gave cast members bad advice.
116	Chores	May 9, 1989	Jennifer Brackenbury, Carlos Braithwaite, Abby Hagyard, Les Lye, William Pohoresky, Jill Stanley, Ted Wilson	(Hulk Hogan Tidies His Room) Ross tricks the kids into cleaning up around the set by making the chores a part of the sketches, including laundry, sewing, and shining shoes. First episode for Jill Stanley, Carlos Braithwaite, and William Pohoresky. Jill assumed host duties for this episode, and was set to continue in that capacity, but did not want the position due to it involving being slimed more often (likely also due to her penchant for forgetting her lines, which would be referenced on the show multiple times). Ironically, she was still green slimed in almost every episode she was featured in. This is the only episode that William appeared in and he was one of the unfortunate "one-episode wonders" to be slimed in his only appearance.
117	Communication	May 10, 1989	Chris Bickford, Jennifer Brackenbury, Abby Hagyard, Les Lye, Sidharth Sahay, Christian Tessier, Chantal Tremblay	(E.T. Phones Home and Gets a $1,000,000 Phone Bill) The show's communication satellites are being disrupted - by an alien who wants to meet the "real star" of the show (Green Slime). First episode for Sidharth Sahay, Christian Tessier, and Chantal Tremblay. Visually, this episode looks very impressive, with all of the UFO footage appearing to have been made specifically for it. However, it was all stock footage from UFO Kidnapped, an abortive Roger Price production from 1983. Long-time prop master Dean Carley is featured on screen amongst the tabloid reporters outside the studio door.
118	Fitness	May 11, 1989	Vicki Essex, Abby Hagyard, Les Lye, Rekha Shah, Christian Tessier, Kevin Ward, Ted Wilson	(Jane Fonda Overworked) The gang spoofs dieting and exercise, and Ted is the Fitness Genie, making Rekha's goals of being thin impossible. First episode for Vicki Essex and Kevin Ward, the latter of whom ends up slimed and pied in the final link. Rekha Shah, last seen in 1986's "Illness" episode, returns and introduces the show. While the off-link sketches skewer exercise and fitness, the link set sketches involve Ted and Christian's quest to get revenge on Kevin, the episode's writer, for getting them slimed and drenched. In real life, Kevin was a writer prodigy and co-wrote several of the 1989-1990 episodes, this one being his first.
119	Malfunctions	May 12, 1989	Stephanie Bauder, Carlos Braithwaite, Abby Hagyard, Les Lye, Jill Stanley, Kevin Ward, Ted Wilson	(Batman's Hairdryer Fries Robin) Everything in the studio goes wrong, including the slime and water gags, while Ted's ugliness breaks every camera in the studio. Kevin Ward's first episode as a credited writer. Vicki Essex is featured uncredited in the detention scene, tied up to the wall. The episode also features the first "group sliming" in seven years, with Ted, Stephanie, Carlos and Jill all slimed at once. The ink fight in the classroom scene was inspired by a real life occurrence that took place during the cast's first script read through.
120	Cleanliness	May 15, 1989	Stephanie Bauder, Chris Bickford, Amyas Godfrey, Abby Hagyard, Les Lye, Jill Stanley, Ted Wilson	(Mr. Clean Falls Into a Tar Pit) Ross whips the kids into a frenzy cleaning up the studio in anticipation of a visit by Mrs. Madge Wildermeyer (a Dolly Parton imitation) of the Senate Committee to Clean Up Television... only to learn that all Mrs. Wildermeyer wanted was for someone to clean the actual camera lenses. Abby Hagyard is slimed for the first time (as Mrs. Wildermeyer). Many of the jokes about the show needing to clean up its image were actual comments received during Nickelodeon focus group screenings.
121	Security	May 16, 1989	Chris Bickford, Abby Hagyard, Les Lye, Patrick Mills, Sidharth Sahay, Jill Stanley, Chantal Tremblay	(Teenage Mutant Ninja Turkeys) Ross signs up the kids for participation on a TV wrestling show, and the gang has to take martial arts classes, but because of the low budget of the show, they have to teach themselves, and when their martial arts outfits fail to arrive, the kids are made to wear ballet tutus instead. Patrick Mills' first episode, and he's unofficially "initiated" with a drenching. Jill's slime scene had to be re-shot, due to her flubbing her lines post-sliming, which is why her hair looks different during the close-up of her getting slimed, and the wide-shot immediately after with the rest of the cast. The tutu's used in this episode were also featured in the "Fantasies" episode, and were made by hand by costumer Violet Wales.
122	Pollution	May 17, 1989	Chris Bickford, Carlos Braithwaite, Andrea Byrne, Amyas Godfrey, Abby Hagyard, Les Lye, Rekha Shah	(The Love Boat Becomes a Garbage Barge) A look at pollution and ecology includes polluted slime and water. This was billed as the grossest episode in YCDTOTV history. In addition to nastier than usual slime and water, this episode features; "toxic waste" is poured on Carlos in the dungeon, Amyas steps in dog dung, and sewage is dumped on the cast during their field trip to the sewer plant. Andrea Byrne and Rekha Shah's final episode (both receiving the unofficial show farewell, when they're slimed with sewage).
123	Fantasies	May 18, 1989	Chris Bickford, Jennifer Brackenbury, Amyas Godfrey, Abby Hagyard, Les Lye, Sariya Sharp, Ted Wilson	(Fantasy Island Becomes a Volcano) The entire show is like one big opposite sketch, as the fantasies of everyone on the show (including the adults) are explored, while Ross plans to surprise the producer's daughter with a fantasy box that grants wishes. Sariya Sharp's first episode (and she receives the unofficial You Can't initiation of being slimed on her first show, as part of the group slime scene). Alasdair Gillis makes a quick guest appearance in the locker jokes scene. The cast members all getting slimed by the fantasy box was a direct reference to Nickelodeon's request for more slime gags.
124	Time	May 19, 1989	Jordan Aaron, Chris Bickford, Jennifer Brackenbury, Abby Hagyard, Les Lye, Sariya Sharp, Christian Tessier	(The Days Of Our Lives) In order to make more cash, the show's producers decide to make the show in black & white (to make it easier to syndicate). When they find out that B&W TV Shows do not make much money they decide to switch back, only to end up in a silent movie! The episode featured black and white slime, and concludes with a classic silent movie-style pie fight. Jordan Aaron's first and last episode. Along with Simone Lumsden in 1982, Jordan was one of the only two cast members in series history to never appear on the link set.
125	Mistakes	May 22, 1989	Stephanie Bauder, Nick Belcourt, Chris Bickford, Abby Hagyard, Les Lye, Sariya Sharp, Ted Wilson	(George Bush Shoots The Wrong Quail) The gang looks at the mistakes kids make and even Ross is guilty of his own mistake, prompting an appearance by the show's fictional producer (his first in eight years). Features more of the show's new focus on gross-out humour; Stephanie and Sariya have dirty bathwater dumped on them, after Ted accidentally gouges a hole in the bathroom by farting while taking a bath, and later on, the cast receives toilet paper instead of paycheques. R. Sole, the producer character, was only seen in two other episodes: the WTYO pilot and 1981's Safety First.
126	Punishment	May 23, 1989	Chris Bickford, Jennifer Brackenbury, Carlos Braithwaite, Abby Hagyard, Les Lye, Sariya Sharp, Christian Tessier	(Mothers of the World Paddle Rambo) Ross decides to punish the kids by having a different kid slimed during each link sketch. Adam Reid makes a guest appearance in this episode as his real-life role as a writer on the show, and is also slimed, prompting the only time in the show's history where someone wrote their own slime gag. 1988 Nickelodeon Slime-In Contest winner Jennifer Dudley (who was slimed three times, the only Slime-In winner to get the bucket more than once) likely had her sliming taped concurrently with the links in this episode in late 1988, as Chris, Jennifer and Carlos (along with Ted Wilson, who wasn't in this episode) appear briefly on the link set with Dudley after her sliming wearing the same outfits as in this episode. (Dudley's sliming was later used in promos for Nickelodeon Studios, despite the sliming being shot at CJOH in Ottawa and not in Orlando.)
127	Beliefs	May 24, 1989	Chris Bickford, Jennifer Brackenbury, Abby Hagyard, Les Lye, Patrick Mills, Jill Stanley, Christian Tessier	(Elvis Presley Is Alive And Working In A Supermarket) In this episode, the gang discuss what people believe in and whether or not their beliefs are reality or fantasy, while Ross spends the show believing Christian is an alien. Much of YCDTOTV's material was derived from reality, and Christian being an alien was an inside joke between him and Roger Price, as was Jill's hatred for both getting slimed, and being seen covered in slime.
128	Age	May 25, 1989	Stephanie Bauder, Chris Bickford, Abby Hagyard, Les Lye, Patrick Mills, James Tung	(Michael Jackson Gets Old And Wrinkled) As a now-destitute Vanessa is brought back to host the show since her contract was still good for one more episode, Chris fears being kicked off the show for being too old as his 15th birthday approaches. Vanessa Lindores guest-hosts this episode and Christine McGlade, Alasdair Gillis, Kevin Kubusheskie, and Doug Ptolemy make cameo appearances. Lisa Ruddy was scheduled to make a cameo as well, but was out of town. Vanessa is slimed and watered twice, much to her dismay, for saying the magic words in previous shows. This made her the only cast member to be slimed with each recipe during the show's run.
129	Excess	May 26, 1989	Chris Bickford, Jennifer Brackenbury, Carlos Braithwaite, Abby Hagyard, Les Lye, Christian Tessier, Kevin Ward	(The Fat Boys Eat New York) As the "era of excess" comes to a close, this episode takes a comedic look at it, and features too much of everything - including slime and water. Each of the kids falls victim to excess levels of stage pollution: Jennifer and Christian receive twice the usual amount of green slime during their slimings, Carlos and Kevin both endure massive drenchings, and Chris is slimed all the way through the closing credits. Adam Reid was upgraded to head co-writer (along with Roger Price) after this episode.
130	Looking Cool	February 5, 1990	Chris Bickford, Carlos Braithwaite, Amyas Godfrey, Abby Hagyard, Les Lye, Sariya Sharp, Jill Stanley, Christian Tessier	(Pee-Wee Herman Wins The Mr. Macho America Contest) The kids explore various things people do to be cool, including... getting slimed. This was a tongue-in-cheek response to Nickelodeon adopting slime as its iconic element, and the episode as a whole was a response to pressure from the network to address more pop culture with sketches. At the insistence of the network, Amyas sports Boston Red Sox apparel, due to their popularity at the time, despite most of the cast being fans of the Toronto Blue Jays in real life.
131	Losing Things aka Lost	February 6, 1990	Nick Belcourt, Chris Bickford, Jennifer Brackenbury, Amyas Godfrey, Abby Hagyard, Les Lye, Chantal Tremblay, Ted Wilson	(Superman Loses His Tights) Chris is traumatized when he loses his beloved leather jacket and Nick is terrified after losing an expensive camera and, in his quest to get it back, ends up finding everything that was ever lost by anyone in the history of the show. This episode also features black slime, a chunkier version of the regular slime, after the ingredients for green slime were lost. Beginning with this episode, Jennifer sported a new hairstyle in real life, with somewhat shorter hair and bangs. Ted is also slimed with spaghetti sauce and forced to eat toothpaste. Several of the "found" items at the end of the show are references to previous cast members and episodes.
132	Failure	February 7, 1990	Stephanie Bauder, Nick Belcourt, Chris Bickford, Abby Hagyard, Les Lye, Jill Stanley, Christian Tessier, Ted Wilson	(no preempted show intro this time because they failed to come up with an idea) When Ross fails to show up for a taping session, the kids have to make the show by themselves. The re-occurring gag of Jill having trouble remembering her lines was somewhat based on real life. Another running gag introduced in this episode was that of Nick believing his name was Ted, which stemmed from Nick's accidentally reading Ted's lines during a real life read-through of the previous episode's script. Prop-master Paul Copping has stated that despite using actual rotten food during the early years, Jill's sliming in this episode actually featured the grossest slime of the series, because it had gone afoul under the hot stage lights while the scene was delayed (by this time, the slime often consisted of cottage cheese with green food coloring added to save time). Director Gerben Heslinga is featured on screen during the opening scene. One of a few episodes to feature Roger Price's dog, Lanie. Nick Belcourt's first sliming of the series in this episode was actually his second sliming, as his first was at the firing squad in the commercial for the 1989 Slime-In sweepstakes.
133	First Times	February 8, 1990	Stephanie Bauder, Chris Bickford, Abby Hagyard, Les Lye, Sidharth Sahay, Sariya Sharp, Kevin Ward, Ted Wilson	(The Wright Brothers Lose Their Luggage) Ross attempts to have the show be the first in various settings and attempts. The show's long time stage-hand Dean Carley appears on-screen for an extended period of time in this episode, during the segment in which the show is done "under water" for the first time. Chris gets a double sliming while trying to deliver a link in Japanese with English subtitles that read "I don't know." This episode also featured the rare occurrence of Les Lye playing two different characters on-screen in the same scene, when Ross interacts with El Capitano at the firing squad post.
134	Celebrations	February 9, 1990	Chris Bickford, Jennifer Brackenbury, Carlos Braithwaite, Abby Hagyard, Les Lye, Patrick Mills, Amy Stanley, Christian Tessier	(Parents And Teachers Celebrate The Cancellation Of You Can't Do That On Television) After getting the consent of each country that carries the show, Ross decides that every scene from the link set will depict one of the different country's style of celebrating, complete with the particular country's wardrobe and food. This is Amy Stanley's first episode as herself (she had appeared, uncredited, in earlier episodes as giant walking teddy bear Big Teddy), and she gets to do the introduction, since she is the first cast member who was not yet born when the series premiered in 1979. She is also initiated with a drenching.
135	Effort	February 12, 1990	Nick Belcourt, Chris Bickford, Jennifer Brackenbury, Abby Hagyard, Les Lye, Sariya Sharp, Christian Tessier, Kevin Ward	(Rambo Thinks) Nick unsuccessfully makes an effort to remember his name (and to avoid getting slimed). Sariya unsuccessfully makes an effort not to get slime or water dumped on her new hairstyle. Christian unsuccessfully makes an effort to be nice to Jennifer. Jennifer unsuccessfully makes an effort to wear a dress... and makes Christian wear it instead. One of only a few bloopers to remain in a final cut, Sariya flubs her line right before her second sliming, but since they had already dumped the first bucket of the scene on Nick, they could not cut and restart the scene.
136	Sports	February 13, 1990	Chris Bickford, Jennifer Brackenbury, Carlos Braithwaite, Abby Hagyard, Les Lye, Sidharth Sahay, Christian Tessier, Chantal Tremblay	(Roseanne Barr Goes Synchronized Swimming) Due to being in charge of sports props, Ross puts the kids through rigorous athletic training; he gets Chris blown up by having him light a gas grill with the "eternal flame", gives Carlos athlete's foot via special effects, gets Jennifer slimed, and scams the kids out of their money with a "test your strength machine" from the carnival. Final episode for Sidharth and Chantal.
137	Smoking(2nd time around)	February 14, 1990	Stephanie Bauder, Carlos Braithwaite, Amyas Godfrey, Abby Hagyard, Les Lye, Sariya Sharp, Christian Tessier, Ted Wilson	(Green Slime Is Scraped From Smokers' Lungs) The kids theorize that Green Slime is really mucus scraped from smokers' lungs, a revolting theory that doesn't stop Ted, Christian and Sariya from getting the stuff dumped on them anyway. Along with the Adoption episode, there was significant negative feedback from the network when this episode aired, a good example of the changing times, as the original Smoking episode in 1981 received no pushback at all. In contrast to the original Smoking episode, however, this one featured significantly more gross-out humor.
138	Generosity	February 15, 1990	Stephanie Bauder, Chris Bickford, Abby Hagyard, Les Lye, Patrick Mills, Jill Stanley, Christian Tessier, Ted Wilson	(Batman Gives Away His Batmobile) With generosity in the air, Chris lets Patrick do the introduction in an effort to get him slimed, the producer gives Jill all of Ted's close-ups, Liz the make-up lady allows Stephanie to look older via old age make-up which makes her appear to be a senior citizen, and Ross allows Christian to be the microphone operator by suspending him on a rope swing when the boom mic breaks. This backfires however, as Christian dumps green slime on Ross twice from his elevated position (Jill and Ted both say "I don't know," but Christian slimes Ross instead of Jill and Ted). In an act of real-life generosity, during the car scene where Jill is pelted with rotten tomatoes, Gerben Heslinga, the show's director, allowed the other cast members to throw the tomatoes. The 1990 Slime-In sweepstakes commercial was shot during this episode's taping. (The contest winner, Justin Luke, was slimed at Nickelodeon Studios in Orlando and not at CJOH, despite the contest promising a trip to the YCDTOTV set as part of the prize.)
139	Embarrassment	February 16, 1990	Chris Bickford, Amyas Godfrey, Abby Hagyard, Les Lye, Amy Stanley, Jill Stanley, Kevin Ward, Ted Wilson	(Rambo Takes Ballet Lessons) In an attempt to embarrass the kids, Ross invites their parents to the studio. In Amyas Godfrey's final episode, he finally gets the chance to introduce the show... but ends up upstaged by Amy, who is also a continuous source of embarrassment for Jill. Jill is drenched and then slimed for forgetting her lines, which was a re-occurring gag on the season, and also a real life reference to her forgetfulness, and her dislike for having green slime dumped on her. Kevin is final cast member to be slimed in the locker room.
SP-2	The Worst of You Can't Do That on Television	no air date	Chris Bickford, Jennifer Brackenbury, Les Lye, Christian Tessier	Unlike the 1987 version, this special was commercially distributed by Elektra Entertainment, and runs only half an hour instead of an hour. It was released in the fall of 1989, in time for the Christmas season. Chris, Jennifer, and Christian are wearing the same outfits from the "Excess" episode. Jennifer gets away without any stage pollution this time, but Chris falls victim to three drenchings and Christian is both drenched and slimed (not in the same scene). Features Moose on the VHS cover (her first sliming from 1983's "Future World") despite her not appearing in the actual movie (aside from clips).

=== Season 10 (1990) ===
After 11 years in production, You Can't Do That on Television is cancelled. Only five episodes were produced, with production ending in February. Nickelodeon's final Slime-In was also held this season, with the winner being slimed at Nickelodeon Studios in Orlando and not in Ottawa, as the series had already been canceled by then.

No.	Subject	Air Date	Cast	Notes
140	Blame	May 21, 1990	Chris Bickford, Jennifer Brackenbury, Carlos Braithwaite, Abby Hagyard, Les Lye, Amy Stanley, Christian Tessier	(Doogie Howser Gets Blamed For Sawing The Wrong Leg Off A Patient) The kids look at how kids are blamed for everything that goes wrong, even when it is not their fault. Features two of the more difficult to film slime scenes in the series, including the "largest" sliming of the show when all five cast members are slimed at the same time after Christian says "We don't know". According to prop-master Sandy Thain, they had to use two oversized buckets and an extra stage ladder. Later, Amy is drenched and then slimed in a bedroom skit, which was the first and only instance of stage pollution in a bedroom scene. Due to the nature of the bedroom set, the slime and water both had to be dumped from the catwalk, rather than the regular stage ladder, requiring several takes before they were able to nail it.
141	Secrets	May 22, 1990	Stephanie Bauder, Chris Bickford, Carlos Braithwaite, Abby Hagyard, Les Lye, Jill Stanley, Ted Wilson	(Tony The Tiger Really Eats Choco-Bombs) In this episode, everything sacred is revealed, and Ted locates the secret ingredients to green slime! He later comes to learn that Ross has tricked him with a fake recipe. As an in-joke, the cast received their scripts for this episode in dossier's marked "top secret".
142	Learning	May 23, 1990	Chris Bickford, Carlos Braithwaite, Abby Hagyard, Les Lye, Amy Stanley, Jill Stanley, Christian Tessier	(Alf Learns To Cook Cats) Final episode for Amy and Jill Stanley and Carlos Braithwaite. The episode begins with Jill, as usual, forgetting her lines while doing the introduction. Amy is slimed in her final scene. Jill also takes some of Amy's slime trying to stop it from falling on Amy, who happens to be wearing a dress that Jill convinced costume lady Violet Wales to make for her. In the Introduction to the Opposites, the letters A, B, C and numbers 1, 2, 3 are hanging from above the link set. The number props are the same as those used in the Mathman sketch way back in Episode Two from 1979.
143	Privileges	May 24, 1990	Stephanie Bauder, Chris Bickford, Abby Hagyard, Les Lye, Patrick Mills, Sariya Sharp, Ted Wilson	(Kermit Treated Like A Prince) Ross revokes all of the kids' privileges, including balloon ball and telephone calls. Final episode for Stephanie Bauder and Patrick Mills, who are both slimed in their last episode. Kevin Kubusheskie and Adam Reid make cameos and bully Ted and Patrick with pies and whipped cream. Patrick is the last cast member to be slimed in the classroom. Originally this episode was planned for the 1988 season, but when Nickelodeon scrapped that, it was put on hold.
144	Inventions	May 25, 1990	Chris Bickford, Jennifer Brackenbury, Abby Hagyard, Les Lye, Sariya Sharp, Christian Tessier, Kevin Ward, Ted Wilson	(MacGyver Invents A Spaceship) In the series finale, the kids learn they're about to be fired and replaced by robots. In a rare example of one of the kids playing a character other than himself/herself for an entire episode, Christian appears as "Alpha-Alpha" the robot. Christian (in character as Alpha-Alpha) receives the final bucket of water and the final sliming of the show's run, although Jennifer's sliming from this episode was actually the last to be shot, and features all of the remaining slime at the studio. This was also one of the rare times in television where a show's cast and producer's knew they would not be coming back, allowing them to make several in-jokes and references to this being the final show of the series, despite it not being a proper "finale". Final episode for Les Lye, Abby Hagyard, Chris Bickford, Jennifer Brackenbury, Christian Tessier, Kevin Ward, Ted Wilson, and Sariya Sharp.
