= Roxy Hunter =

Fictional character played by Aria Wallace

Roxy Hunter is a fictional character played by Aria Wallace in four television films for Nickelodeon in the United States: Roxy Hunter and the Mystery of the Moody Ghost (2007), Roxy Hunter and the Secret of the Shaman (2008), Roxy Hunter and the Myth of the Mermaid (2008), and Roxy Hunter and the Horrific Halloween (2008).

== Roxy Hunter and the Mystery of the Moody Ghost ==
Roxy Hunter and the Mystery of the Moody Ghost is a 2007 Canadian Nickelodeon Original Movie, and is the first TV film of Roxy Hunter series. It is produced by Dolphin Entertainment, and premiered on October 30, 2007. It premiered on Family on May 19, 2008. The film was released on DVD on February 5, 2008.

The animation sequences were produced by Nickelodeon Animation Studio.

=== Synopsis ===
In 1944, a woman who was planning to get engaged was stopped by her father's gun. 63 years later, Roxy Hunter, an irrepressible 9-year-old moves to a spooky, old house in the country. There, she stumbles into a weird world of unsolved mysteries and the unknown. With the help of her best friend Max, a 12-year-old genius she calls her fiancé, she embarks on a mission to solve a crime, save their house, and re-unite lost love from beyond the grave.

=== Cast ===
==== Main ====
- Aria Wallace as Roxy Hunter
- Robin Brûlé as Susan Hunter
- Demetrius Joyette as Max
- Yannick Bisson as Jon
- Vik Sahay as Ramma

==== Supporting ====
- Jessica Booker as Estelle Moody
  - Lara Jean Chorostecki as Young Estelle
- Rod Campbell as Mr. Moody
- Austin MacDonald as Andy
- Johnie Chase as Johnie Chase
- Jayne Eastwood as Mable Crabtree
- Stephanie Anne Mills as Rebecca
- Sebastian Pigott as Ted Caruthers
- R.D. Reid as Middleton
- Julian Richings as Librarian Tibers
- Sandi Ross as Nurse

=== Books ===
In 2007, Penguin Children's Books released the Roxy Hunter book line which includes junior novels Roxy Hunter and The Mystery of the Moody Ghost and The Secret of the Shaman by Tracey West. Accompanying the novels was The Roxy Hunter Case Files by James Kee and Robin Dunne. Each case file gives a journal-like first-person account of each mystery from the perspective of Roxy herself.

== Roxy Hunter and the Secret of the Shaman ==
Roxy Hunter and the Secret of the Shaman is a 2008 Canadian Nickelodeon Original Movie that aired on February 1, 2008. It is a direct sequel to the Roxy Hunter and the Mystery of the Moody Ghost. The film is produced by Dolphin Entertainment and was dedicated to Jeanne Culp. The film was released on DVD on July 15, 2008.

=== Synopsis ===
Ahead of the 150th anniversary of Serenity Falls, a part of the celebration lighthouse is stolen, which is used by a shaman. Roxy is preparing for the Festival of Lights.

=== Cast ===
==== Main ====
- Aria Wallace as Roxy Hunter
- Robin Brûlé as Susan Hunter
- Demetrius Joyette as Max
- Yannick Bisson as Jon Steadman
- Vik Sahay as Ramma
- Richard McMillan as Shamam Karrie

==== Supporting ====
- Julian Richings as Mr. Tibers
- Lorne Cardinal as Lorne Red Deer
- Joe Pingue as Deputy Sheriff Martin Potts
- Austin MacDonald as Andy
- Tara Shelley as Jill
- Connor Fyfe as Timmy
- Tyler Fyfe as Tommy
- Connor McCauley as Seth

== Roxy Hunter and the Myth of the Mermaid ==
Roxy Hunter and the Myth of the Mermaid is a 2008 Canadian Nickelodeon Original Movie that aired on July 13, 2008. It is a direct sequel to the previous film Roxy Hunter and the Secret of the Shaman. The film was released on DVD on October 14, 2008.

=== Synopsis ===
Roxy, in pursuit of a local journalism award, befriends and brings home a mysterious amnesiac who was found soaking wet outside of the local coffee shop. After ceremoniously naming her Annie Nonomys, Roxy takes the young lady home and finds that even the most common household item is a complete mystery to Annie. When Annie returns dripping wet from the lake several nights in a row, Roxy determines what is abundantly clear to her: Annie is a mermaid, who has to find her way home back in the sea.

=== Cast ===
==== Main ====
- Aria Wallace as Roxy Hunter
- Demetrius Joyette as Max
- Robin Brûlé as Susan Hunter
- Yannick Bisson as Jon Steadman
- Ashleigh Rains as Annie

==== Supporting ====
- Denis Akiyama as Kyoto
- Roger Dunn as Sheriff Tom
- Jeffrey R. Smith as Saul
- Jayne Eastwood as Mable Crabtree
- Tyler Fyfe as Tommy
- Connor Fyfe as Tommy
- Gerry Mendicino as Nikos
- Deborah Grover as Ms. Slausen
- Kevin Jubinville as Kip
- Austin MacDonald as Andy
- Connor McAuley as Seth
- Joe Pingue as Deputy Potts
- Gord Rand as Louis
- Julian Richings as Mr. Tibers
- Vik Sahay as Rama
- Cliff Saunders as Dessie

== Roxy Hunter and the Horrific Halloween ==
Roxy Hunter and the Horrific Halloween is a 2008 Canadian Nickelodeon Original Movie. It is the fourth and final film of the Roxy Hunter series, and a direct sequel to the previous film Roxy Hunter and the Myth of the Mermaid. The film premiered on The N on October 31, 2008, as part of their Halloween Block, and did not premiere on Nickelodeon proper.

=== Plot ===
Roxy Hunter walks out of school to find a new boy from Transylvania named Stefan being bullied. Finally snapping, Stefan throws his lunch at Seth, the head bully. Seth however ducks, the food hits Roxy, and the two of them start a fierce rivalry. On her mother Susan's advice, she decides to try to make peace with Stefan.

Meanwhile, Max is having his last day at Moody Mansion, before his parents come to pick him up, but soon learns that they cannot come because of getting a huge cut of a gold mining expedition via video chat. Heartbroken, Max skips out on dinner and spends all of his time in his bedroom. Meanwhile, Susan is slightly shocked to find out that Jon wants to move in with her.

When Roxy goes to visit Stefan at his house, she sees an old woman stirring something strangely red in a cauldron. When Roxy points out that the house is so quiet and dark, Stefan says his uncle Vlad Petrescu sleeps during the day, and is very sensitive to light. When they go into Stefan's room, Vlad enters a short while after, telling them to keep the noise down. As he leaves, Roxy notices something red on his hand, as though dried blood.

At home, she quickly starts to believe that Stefan's family are vampires. She meets Stefan at a small gazebo in the woods with garlic and different holy relics to test whether or not he is a vampire. He passes the test, but it is clear that he has no idea that his uncle is a vampire. Roxy hastily says goodbye and runs off.

Finding Seth and his gang, Roxy tells them about this, and they go and investigate. Roxy and Seth find several wooden crates in Vlad's barn. In one of them is a horrifying painting. Vlad hears their screaming, and when the club shoots him with garlic and holy water-loaded water guns, they realize that Vlad is not affected and they run off, but Vlad manages to catch Roxy. When he calls Susan over, Roxy blurts out "He's a vampire!". Vlad then explains that he is a painter and the "blood" on his hands is merely red paint. Roxy apologizes, but still gets grounded. She then receives a letter from Stefan saying to meet him at the gazebo. Once there, Roxy learns that Stefan's parents are very poor, and his father, an artist, hoped that Vlad, who is really a family friend, could sell his paintings (the ones that Roxy found in the crates the previous day) in America, but it turns out that Vlad has signed his name on the paintings to sell them for his own benefit.

Meanwhile, Max meets up with his old friend Jill to egg the sheriff's house, but the eggs were actually hard-boiled and break right through the window. While everyone else runs off, Max stays, knowing he deserves to be punished. The sheriff tells him about a high school prank gone wrong, resulting in the entire school burning down. His father tried to send him to a military academy, but he ran away to go on an amateur music tour. When he got back, he wanted to tell his father that he had learned that he was acting in his son's best interest, but his father had died. He ends the story by letting Max off the hook after telling him that, though his parents have let him down, it does not mean that they do not love him.

Susan gives Roxy a spark of idea on how to stop Vlad and make him confess: scaring the confession out of him. They set up a haunted house, with various scares along the way, until it ends in Vlad running into the forest. Roxy says that she is a vampire, and that she will turn him into a living dead. Terrified, he confesses to his crimes, and the sheriff, who was spying on Roxy's plan takes him to jail for art fraud.

At dinner, Jon proposes to Susan. She accepts and they are engaged. Max learns to overcome his depression. Best of all, with the money for the paintings, Stefan's parents are able to come to America.

=== Cast ===
==== Main ====
- Aria Wallace as Roxy Hunter
- Demetrius Joyette as Max
- Robin Brûlé as Susan Hunter
- Yannick Bisson as Jon
- Connor Price as Stefan

==== Supporting ====
- Devon Bostick as Drew
- Juan Chioran as Vlad Petrescu
- Brandon Craggs as Stevie
- Roger Dunn as Sheriff Tom
- Jacob Fraud as Timmy
- Tyler Fyfe as Tommy
- Marcia Laskowski as Janet
- Maria Lebb as Grandma Petrscu
- Austin MacDonald as Andy
- Connor McAuley as Seth
- Joe Pingue as Deputy Potts
- Julian Richings as Mr. Tibers
- Martin Roach as Pierre
- Victor Gares as Rama
- Tara Shelley as Jill
