= Joanne Caras =

US television presenter and author

- Born: Joanne Elizabeth Schene; February 17, 1956 (age 70); Catonsville, Maryland
- Occupations: TV host, author
- Years active: 1983–present
- Website: www.holocaustsurvivorcookbook.com

Joanne Caras is the star of the television cooking show Miracles & Meals with Joanne Caras which appeared on the Jewish Life Television (JLTV) network. She is the author of two cookbooks, The Holocaust Survivor Cookbook and Miracles & Meals.

== Early life and education ==
Joanne Elizabeth Schene was born on February 17, 1956, in Catonsville, Maryland to Joseph and Betty Lou (Droter) Schene. Joanne was raised in a Catholic family. In 1982 she married Harvey Caras, a Jewish man from Malden, Massachusetts. She later converted to Judaism. Joanne and Harvey have three children: Jonathan Caras, Rachel Loeb, and Michael Caras. Joanne is a graduate of Catonsville High School and earned a bachelor's degree from Hood College.

== Career ==
Caras began her television career in 1983 as the star of Fun Fitness, an exercise show that appeared on Howard Cable TV in Maryland. She then went on to star as "Miss Joanne" on the children's show Kidstuff. Because of her popularity, Caras became a much sought-after entertainer for children's birthday parties and spent eighteen years teaching movement and drama at nursery schools.

=== Holocaust Survivor Cookbook project ===
In 2005 Caras visited Israel for the first time. Among the many places, she visited was Carmei Ha’ir, an open restaurant that fed over 500 people every day regardless of their ability or inability to pay for their meal. Carmei Ha’ir means "All who are hungry shall eat". Caras came home to America determined to do a project to raise money for Carmei Ha’ir. The project she chose was to gather stories of survival from Holocaust survivors and combine them with family recipes. She named it The Holocaust Survivor Cookbook. All profits from the sale of the cookbook went to Carmei Ha’ir and to selected other charities. In 2011 Caras published a sequel called Miracles & Meals which contains additional stories and recipes. Caras is also an public speaker who has appeared in over 400 cities around the world

=== JLTV ===
In 2012 Caras presented the cooking show Miracles & Meals with Joanne Caras for JLTV. Forty-two episodes were produced over two seasons and the show still appears on JLTV. In each episode, Caras prepares recipes from her cookbooks and then tells the story of the survivor from whom the recipe was received.

== Philanthropy ==
Caras has raised over $1.2 million for various charities from the sale of her cookbooks. The largest beneficiary of her cookbooks has been Carmei Ha'ir.
