= Samir Rehem =

Canadian film and television director

Samir Rehem is a Canadian film and television director. He is most noted for his 2007 short film The Answer Key, which was a Genie Award nominee for Best Live Action Short Drama at the 29th Genie Awards in 2009.

Originally from Fonthill, Ontario, he was educated at York University and Ryerson University. He first worked in the industry as a production assistant, and worked his way up to becoming an editor on Citytv's MovieTelevision and FashionTelevision, before making the independent feature film Invitation in 2001.

He has since worked predominantly in television, directing episodes of Kenny vs. Spenny, Cock'd Gunns, Testees, Pure Pwnage, Skins, Little Mosque on the Prairie, This Hour Has 22 Minutes, Degrassi: The Next Generation, Lost & Found Music Studios, What Would Sal Do?, Killjoys, The Next Step, Coroner, Private Eyes, Tiny Pretty Things and Revival.

He received a Gemini Award nomination for Best Direction in a Comedy Program or Series at the 24th Gemini Awards for the Testees episode "Herfume", a Canadian Screen Award nomination for Best Direction in a Children's or Youth Program or Series at the 1st Canadian Screen Awards in 2013 for the Next Step episode "Sabotage" and a Prism Prize nomination in 2015 for his video for Kevin Drew's "You in Your Were", and won a Canadian Comedy Award for Direction of a Television Episode or Special in 2008 for Cock'd Gunns.
