= The Answer Key =

2007 Canadian film directed by Samir Rehem

- Directed by: Samir Rehem
- Written by: Sean Moore; Samir Rehem; Joe Pingue
- Produced by: Robin Crumley; Joe Pingue; Samir Rehem
- Starring: Joe Pingue; Robin Brûlé
- Cinematography: Brendan Steacy
- Edited by: Samir Rehem
- Music by: Jim McGrath
- Production company: Capri Vision
- Release date: September 7, 2007 (TIFF)
- Running time: 22 minutes
- Country: Canada
- Language: English

The Answer Key, also known as A Cure for Terminal Loneliness, is a Canadian short drama film, directed by Samir Rehem and released in 2007. The film stars Joe Pingue as Joseph Strobe, a government contractor who faces the greatest challenge of his life when he tests positive for the affliction of terminal loneliness, and Robin Brûlé as Dawn Moore, a woman who may offer him his only chance at saving his life.

The film premiered at the 2007 Toronto International Film Festival under the Cure for Terminal Loneliness title. It was screened at the 2008 CFC Worldwide Short Film Festival as The Answer Key, where Brendan Steacy won the award for Best Cinematography in a Canadian Short Film.

The film was a Genie Award nominee for Best Live Action Short Drama at the 29th Genie Awards in 2009.
