= Aria Wallace =

American actress, singer and songwriter (born 1996)

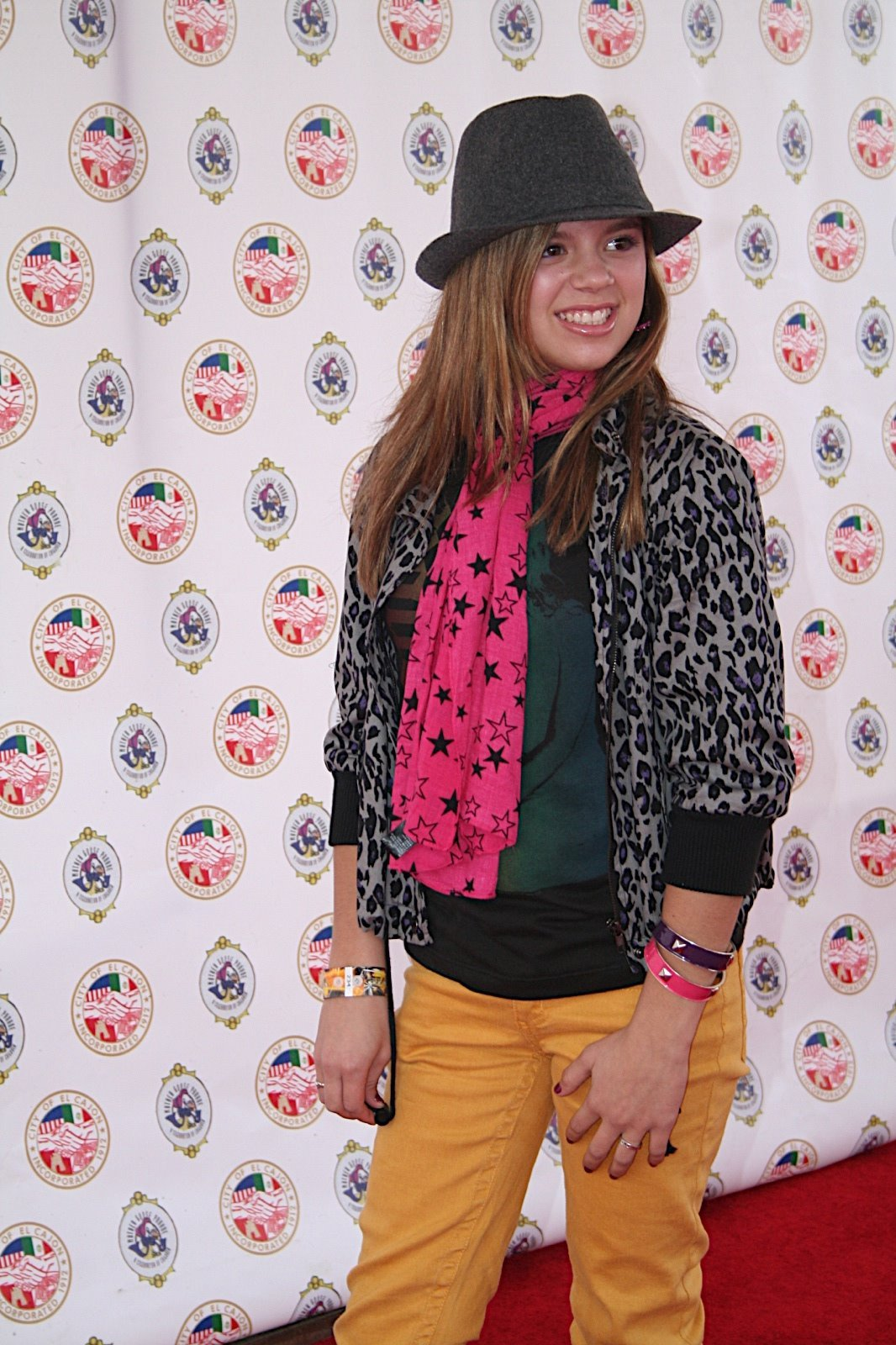
- Wallace in November 2008
- Born: Aria Summer Wallace; November 3, 1996 (age 29); Atlanta, Georgia, U.S.
- Occupations: Actress; singer; songwriter
- Years active: 2002–present

Aria Summer Wallace (born November 3, 1996) is an American singer, songwriter and actress. She is known for her guest role as Amanda "Mandy" Valdez on the Nickelodeon sitcom iCarly and for her role as Roxy Hunter in the four Nickelodeon Original Movies of the same name.

== Life and career ==
Aria Summer Wallace was born on November 3, 1996.

In 2002, she made her television debut in the show The Bernie Mac Show, as Lara. On June 17, 2005, Wallace made her film debut in the movie The Perfect Man, as Zoe Hamilton, alongside Hilary Duff, who played Zoe's sister Holly, and Heather Locklear who played Zoe's and Holly's mother Jean. She also guest starred on the Nickelodeon television show iCarly, portraying Mandy, an obsessed fan.

== Filmography ==
Year	Show	Role	Notes
2002	The Bernie Mac Show	Lara (her)	Episode: "Back in the Day"
2003	Charmed	Crying Little Girl	Episode: "Valhalley of the Dolls: Part 1"
2003	Carnivàle	Polly Ann	Episode: "Black Blizzard"
2003	That '70s Show	Little Girl #2	Episode: "Christmas"
2004	What Should You Do?	Amy	Episode: "Talk Show Hero"
2004	Judging Amy	Jessica Adelstein	Episode: "Predictive Neglect"
2004	Strong Medicine	Emma Troting	Episode: "Virgin Birth"
2004	The Tonight Show with Jay Leno	Little Meanie	
2005	Untitled David Diamond/David Weissman Project	—N/a	
2005	The Bernie Mac Show	Riley	Episode: "You Got Served"; Second Occurrence on the show, after portraying Lara in 2002, which was her debut.
2005	Desperate Housewives	Lily Stevens	Episode: "There Won't Be Trumpets"
2005	The Perfect Man	Zoe Hamilton	
2005	Criminal Minds	Jennifer	Episode: "Won't Get Fooled Again"
2005	CSI: NY	Emily Dickerson	Episode: "Grand Murder at Central Station"
2007	Christmas in Paradise	Nell	
2007	Roxy Hunter and the Mystery of the Moody Ghost	Roxy Hunter	Lead role
2008	Roxy Hunter and the Secret of the Shaman	Roxy Hunter	Lead role
2008	Roxy Hunter and the Myth of the Mermaid	Roxy Hunter	Lead role
2008	Roxy Hunter and the Horrific Halloween	Roxy Hunter	Lead role
2008–09	iCarly	Amanda "Mandy" Valdez	Episodes: "iAm Your Biggest Fan", "iWant My Website Back"
2011	Spork	Christian Girl #2	
