= Robin Brûlé =

Canadian actress

- Occupation: Actress
- Years active: 1994-present

Robin Brûlé is a Canadian actress, who is best known for her role as Susan Hunter in the Roxy Hunter series and as K.C.'s mother Lisa Guthrie in Degrassi The Next Generation

== Filmography ==
=== Film ===
Year	Title	Role	Notes
1994	1994	Amy Wrightman	
2000	Gossip	Louise	
2000	Girls Who Say Yes	Jenn	Short
2006	.45	The Waitress	
2007	Killing Zelda Sparks	Jane	
2007	The Answer Key	Dawn Moore	Short
2007	Breakfast with Scot	Ms. Paul	
2015	No Stranger Than Love	Verna Coburn	

=== Television ===
Year	Title	Role	Notes
1995	Flash Forward	Ellen Fisher	Regular role
1996	Straight Up	Marcia	
1996	Talk to Me	Lucille-Ann	TV film
1996	Ready or Not	Leah	Episode: "Dining Club"
1997	Psi Factor	Andrea Best	Episode: "Second Sight/Chocolate Soldier"
1998	When Husbands Cheat	Sophie	TV film
1998	Traders	Rachel Lindsey	Episodes: "A Friend in Need", "Six Degrees of Duplicity"
1999	Ultimate Deception	Cloë	TV film
1999	Nothing Too Good for a Cowboy	Muriel	Episode: "The Stud"
1999	The City	Angie Hart	Main role
1999	The Last Witness	Christy Dyer	TV film
2001	The Wandering Soul Murders	Debbie Morin	TV film
2001	Sanctuary	Ginny	TV film
2002–2003	An American in Canada	Mara	Main role
2003	Killer Instinct: From the Files of Agent Candice DeLong	Natalie Behrens	TV film
2004	Bliss	Stephanie	Episode: "Steph's Life"
2004	The Shields Stories	Unknown	TV miniseries
2004	Metropia	Sophie	TV series
2004-2006	Puppets Who Kill	Sister Louise, Bonnie	Episodes: "Prostitutes for Jesus", "Dan's Ideal Woman"
2005	Kevin Hill	Tanya Zane	Episode: "Occupational Hazard"
2005	This Is Wonderland	Molly Ariano	Episode: "2.6"
2005	Cool Money	Stephanie Comfort	TV film
2006	At the Hotel	Adelaide	Main role
2006	Why I Wore Lipstick to My Mastectomy	Wendy	TV film
2007	Custody	Megan	TV film
2007–2008	Roxy Hunter	Susan Hunter	TV films
2007–2008	Billable Hours	Millie Larkin	Regular role
2008	Anne of Green Gables: A New Beginning	Elsie Barry	TV film
2008	All the Comforts	Joyce	TV series
2009	Being Erica	Andrea	Episode: "She's Lost Control"
2009	Flashpoint	Cindy Greenwood	Episode: "The Perfect Family"
2010–2011	Baxter	Lily	Recurring role
2010–2012	Degrassi: The Next Generation	Lisa Guthrie	Recurring role
2011	Skins	Jillian Richardson	Episodes: "Cadie", "Michelle"
2011	She's the Mayor	Leslie Bodner	Episode: "Heart and Hope"
2012	Lost Girl	Carla	Episode: "Fae-nted Love"
2014	Saving Hope	Bridgette Garvey	Episode: "Breathless"
2014	Rookie Blue	Sarah Swarek	Episodes: "Blink", "All by Her Selfie"
2014	My Daughter Must Live	Elly	TV film
2014	The Listener	Gabriella Zimmer	Episode: "Amuse Bouche"
2015	Murdoch Mysteries	Eunice Parks	Episode: "The Devil Wears Whalebone"
2015–2016	Dark Matter	Mom	Episodes: "1.6", "We Were Family"
2017	What Would Sal Do?	Leena	Regular role
