= Vik Sahay =

Canadian actor of Indian descent

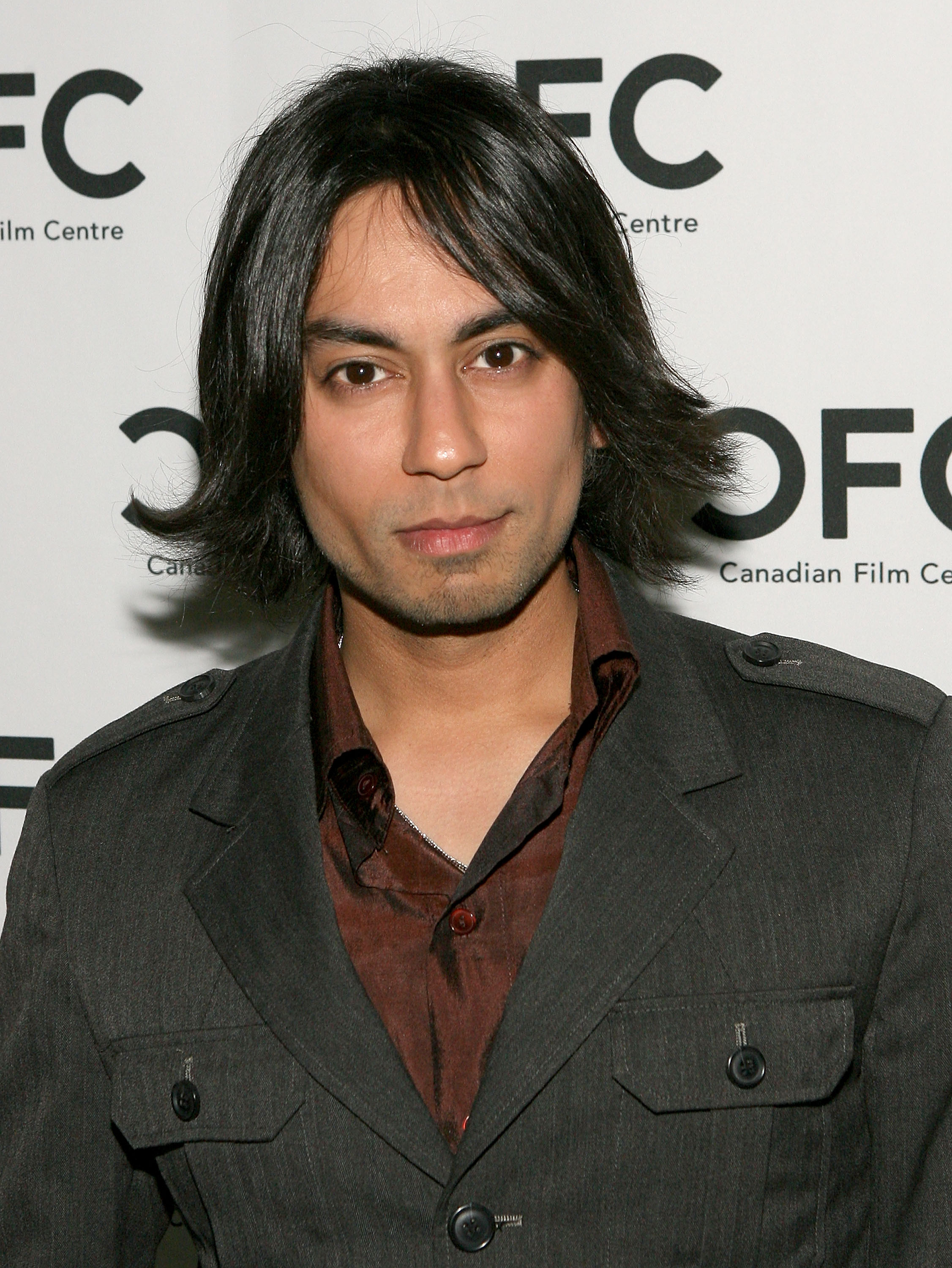
- Sahay at San Diego Comic-Con in 2011
- Born: Vikram Sahay; 20 September 1971 (age 54); Ottawa, Ontario, Canada
- Occupation: voice actor
- Years active: 1986–present

Vikram Sahay is a Canadian actor best known for playing Kevin Calvin on Radio Active, Lester Patel on the television series Chuck, and Rama in the Roxy Hunter saga.

== Life and career ==
Vik Sahay was born in Ottawa, Ontario, to Indian parents, and attended Canterbury High School of the Arts in Ottawa. He went on to study Theatre Performance at Montreal's Concordia University.

He learned to perform Indian classical dance with his brother Sidharth Sahay. In 1986 and 1987, he appeared on three episodes of the children's television show You Can't Do That on Television. He was also featured in the television series Radio Active, playing sportscaster Kevin Calvin. Based on that work, he was selected to appear in Our Hero as Dalal Vidya, for which he was nominated for a 2002 Canadian Comedy Award. Subsequently, he also portrayed attorney Anil Sharma on the CBC series This is Wonderland during its second and third seasons.

Sahay has appeared in such films as Roxy Hunter and the Mystery of the Moody Ghost, Good Will Hunting, eXistenZ, Hollow Point, Rainbow, The Ride, Wings of Hope, The Rocker, Amal, and Afghan Luke. He portrayed Lester Patel, the "HinJew" half of Jeffster!, on the television series Chuck. He played the role of Prateek Duraiswamy (Stifler's boss) in the film American Reunion. He was a guest star as a murder suspect on the FOX show Bones season 8 episode 13. In 2016 he had a guest starring role on the revival of The X-Files.

=== Personal life ===
Sahay divides his time between Los Angeles and Toronto.

== Filmography ==
Film
Year	Title	Role	Notes
1996	Rainbow	Tiger #3	
1996	Hollow Point	Livingston's assistant	
1997	Good Will Hunting	Nemesh/M.I.T. Student # 3	Credited as "Vic Sahay"
1999	eXistenZ	Male Assistant	
2001	Wings of Hope	Ricky	
2005	Murder Unveiled	Bindri	
2007	Amal	Vivek Jayaram	
2008	The Rocker	Gary	
2008	Time Bomb	Samir/Habib	
2011	Afghan Luke	Imran Sahar	
2012	American Reunion	Prateek Duraiswamy	
2013	My Awkward Sexual Adventure	Dandak Sajal	Nominated – Canadian Comedy Award for Best Performance by a Male, Film
2014	Wer	Eric Sarin	
2016	A Date with Miss Fortune	Wilson	
2018	Sharon 1.2.3.	Drew	
2018	In Heaven's Hands	Bare Qasai	
2019	Captain Marvel	Hero Torfan	
2022	Bar Fight!	Dick	
2023	It Lives Inside	Inesh	

Television
Year	Title	Role	Notes
1986–1987	You Can't Do That On Television	Vikram	5 episodes
1996	Everything to Gain	Roland Jellico	TV movie
1997	Balls Up	Debdash	TV movie
1997	Platinum	Anthony Medeci	TV movie
1998–1999	Radio Active	Kevin Calvin	26 episodes
2000	The Ride		TV movie
2000–2002	Our Hero	Dalal Vidya	11 episodes; Nominated – Canadian Comedy Award Television for Pretty Funny Male Performance (2002)
2005	This Is Wonderland	Anil Sharma	21 episodes
2007	Roxy Hunter and the Mystery of the Moody Ghost	Ramma	TV movie
2007–2012	Chuck	Lester Patel	Series Regular; 80 episodes
2008	Roxy Hunter and the Myth of the Mermaid	Ramma	TV movie
2008	Roxy Hunter and the Secret of the Shaman	Ramma	TV movie
2008	Roxy Hunter and the Horrific Halloween	Ramma	TV movie
2013	Bones	Akshay Mirza	Episode: "The Twist in the Plot"
2013	The Mentalist	Nicholas Vashum	Episode: "Black-Winged Redbird"
2013-2014	Sean Saves the World	Howard	Recurring
2013-2014	NCIS	Ajay Khan	Episodes: "Canary" and "House Rules"
2016	The X-Files	Gupta	Episode: "Founder's Mutation"
2016	Lucifer	Ray Codfree	Episode: "Sin-Eater"
2016	Quest For Truth	VIk	TV movie
2017	Grimm	Dr. Sanji Raju	Episode: "The Son Also Rises"
2017	Preacher	Frank Patel	Episode: "Mumbai Sky Tower"
2018	Scorpion	Raja Bhatt	Episode: "Dumbster Fire"
2018-2019	Lodge 49	Tarquin	Recurring; 7 episodes

Video Games

Year	Title	Role	Notes
2019	Anthem	Matthias	
