= Joe Pingue =

Canadian actor and filmmaker

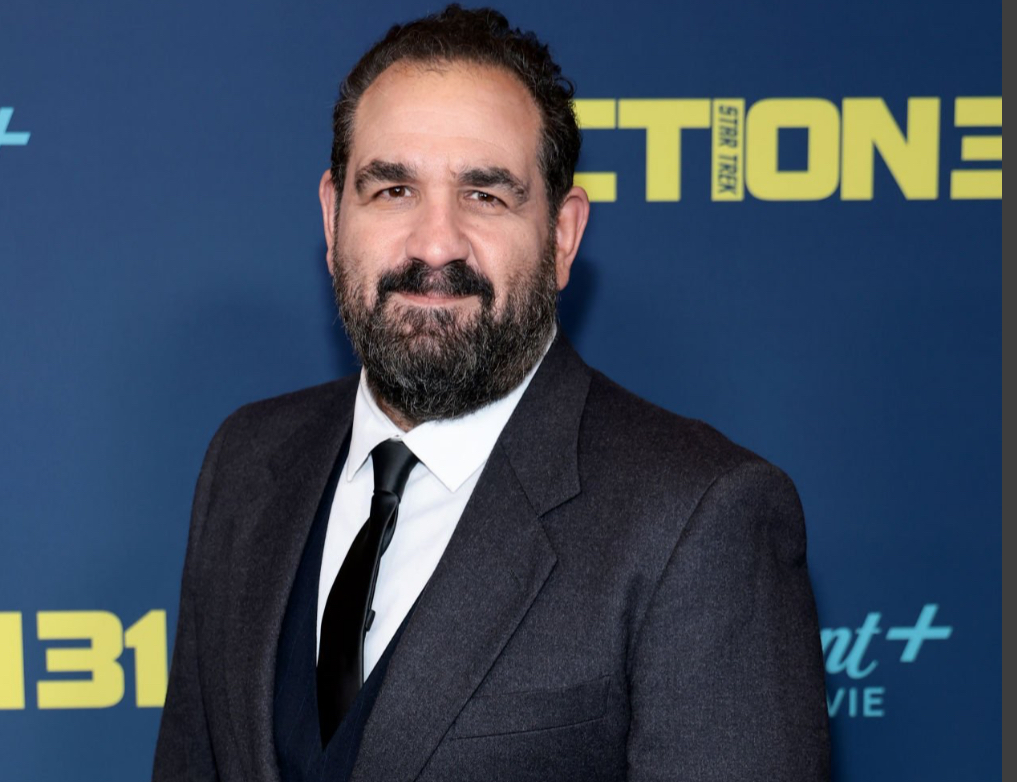
- Joe Pingue in 2025 at the Star Trek: Section 31 premiere
- Born: Giuseppe Pingue; St. Catharines, Ontario, Canada
- Education: BFA
- Occupations: Actor, producer, writer
- Years active: 1995–present
- Known for: Film & television actor
- Notable work: Station Eleven, The Expanse, The Boondock Saints, Godless
- Website: https://m.imdb.com/name/nm0684187/

Giuseppe Pingue is a Canadian actor and filmmaker. His roles include Captain McDowell in the Prime sci-fi series The Expanse, Aloznzo Bunker in the Netflix Western limited series Godless, Whiff in Thomas & Friends: All Engines Go and Hoyt in the feature film The Book of Eli.

== Early life ==
Pingue was born and raised in St. Catharines, Ontario. He attended Ridley College for both elementary and high school, and studied theatre at York University.

== Career ==
Giuseppe "Joe" Pingue is a Canadian character actor. He became known for playing supporting roles in many films such as Miss Sloane, American Whiskey Bar, Pompeii, Antiviral, The Boondock Saints, Repo Men, Blindness, The Book of Eli, Maps to the Stars and Dream House.

His television work includes appearances on Degrassi: The Next Generation, Orphan Black, Wild Card, 24 Hour Rental, Across the River to Motor City, The Expanse, Godless and the HBO miniseries Station Eleven. He also is the voice of Tamago on the animated series The Very Good Adventures of Yam Roll in Happy Kingdom, the voice of Entree on the animated series Spliced, Dan in Trucktown, Whiff in Thomas & Friends: All Engines Go, Ming in Kody Kapow and additional voices in Norman Picklestripes, and Agent Binky: Pets of the Universe.

=== Producing and writing ===
Pingue produced, wrote and appeared in the short film The Answer Key, which was nominated for a Genie Award. He also directed, produced and wrote the short film Chili & Cheese: A Condimental Rift which won the top Prize at the Marin County Short Film Festival and had its television premiere on CBC.

== Filmography ==
=== Film ===
Year	Title	Role
1999	The Boondock Saints	Geno
2002	The Rats	Karl
2008	The Answer Key	Joseph Strobe
2010	Repo Men	Ray
2010	The Book of Eli	Hoyt
2012	Antiviral	Arvid
2013	Pacific Rim	Captain Merrit
2013	The Nut Job	Johnny
2014	Pompeii	Graecus
2014	Maps to the Stars	Arnold
2015	Room	Officer Grabowski
2016	Miss Sloane	Little Sam
2017	The Glass Castle	Uncle Stanley
2018	Anon	Lester Hagen
2021	See for Me	Dave
2021	Paw Patrol: The Movie	Barney
2023	The Burning Season	Tom
2024	The Apprentice	Anthony Salerno
2025	Star Trek: Section 31	Dada Noe
2026	Unholy Night	Nazario

== Awards and nominations ==
Year	Award	Category	Work	Result	Ref
2006	ACTRA Awards	Best Performance - Male	Leo	Nominated	
2006	Canadian Comedy Awards	Best Male Film Performance	Leo	Nominated	
2007	Gemini Awards	Best Ensemble Performance in a Comedy Program or Series	Rent-A-Goalie	Nominated	
2008	Gemini Awards	Best Ensemble Performance in a Comedy Program or Series	Rent-A-Goalie	Nominated	
2008	Genie Awards	Best Live Action Short Drama	The Answer Key	Nominated	
2008	ACTRA Awards	Best Performance - Male	The Answer Key	Nominated	
2009	Gemini Awards	Best Ensemble Performance in a Comedy Program or Series	Rent-A-Goalie	Nominated	
2015	NSI Online Short Film Festival Awards	Best Comedy	Chili and Cheese: A Condimental Rift	Won	
