= Kidstuff (TV series) =

Canadian children's television series

- Genre: children's variety
- Written by: Bill Hartley
- Directed by: Larry Kimber; Bill Hartley
- Starring: Harry Coates; Cathy Cornell; Suzin Schiff; Doug Springall; Maryann B. Joffe; Wally Martin; Susan Mainzer; Les Nirenberg
- Composer: Cliff Jones
- Country of origin: Canada
- Original language: English
- No. of episodes: 26

Production
- Producer: Bill Hartley
- Production location: Montreal (CFCF Channel 12)
- Running time: 30 minutes
- Production companies: CTV; Champlain Productions

Original release
- Network: CTV
- Release: 27 September 1975 – 1976

Kidstuff is a Canadian children's television series produced by CTV and Champlain Productions, in 1975 and 1976.

== Premise ==
The series provided a combination of entertainment and education for children between eight and 12 years old. It had a cast of 4 children (Harry Coates, Cathy Cornell, Suzin Schiff, and Doug Springall) and 4 adults (Maryann B. Joffe, Wally Martin, Susan Mainzer, and Les Nirenberg) as various goofy characters the kids interacted with. Later the character Mr. Magic was introduced into the show played by real magician Ian Snow Carpenter.

It made extensive use of chromakey technology, to depict the cast as miniaturized on a set consisting of toys, games, and candy. It also used Robotoons, a "live-cartoon" technology, similar to Aniforms, created by the show's set designer, Don Keller. Choreography was by Big Time Productions.

The show was written by Bill Hartley, with Janis Nostbakken as Educational Advisor.

Cliff Jones and Bill Hartley composed the music for the series. Vocal Direction was by Phil Pitre. A soundtrack album was released by Rising Records (RILP-101).

Costumes were by Juul Haalmeyer, who would later be best known for costuming The David Steinberg Show, SCTV and CODCO.

== Production ==
Kidstuff was produced in Montreal at CFCF-TV and premiered on CTV for its 1975-76 season. 26 episodes were produced over two seasons and rebroadcast for several more years thereafter. The first season of 17 episodes was produced for approximately $400 000.

The series premiered 27 September 1975, in the 10 a.m. Eastern time slot. The debut episode was recorded on 27 February 1975. The series attracted a national rating of 425 000 viewers.

== Awards and recognition ==
- 1976: New York Festivals - International Film and Television Awards - gold medal
- 1976: ACTRA Award
